= Fencing at the 1988 Summer Olympics – Men's épée =

Men's épée at the Games of the XXIV Olympiad
- Gymnasium (2020)
- Venue: SK Olympic Handball Gymnasium (then "Olympic Fencing Gymnasium")
- Dates: 23 – 24 September 1988
- Competitors: 79 from 33 nations

Medalists
1st place, gold medalist(s)		Arnd Schmitt; West Germany
2nd place, silver medalist(s)		Philippe Riboud; France
3rd place, bronze medalist(s)		Andrey Shuvalov; Soviet Union

The men's épée was one of eight fencing events on the fencing at the 1988 Summer Olympics programme. It was the twentieth appearance of the event. The competition was held from 23 to 24 September 1988. 79 fencers from 33 nations competed. Each nation was limited to 3 fencers. The event was won by Arnd Schmitt of West Germany, the nation's second victory in the event (matching Belgium, Cuba, and Hungary for third-most). France's Philippe Riboud took silver, adding to his 1980 and 1984 bronze medals to become the third man to earn three medals in the individual épée. Andrey Shuvalov earned the Soviet Union's first medal in the event since 1968 with his bronze.

== Background ==
This was the 20th appearance of the event, which was not held at the first Games in 1896 (with only foil and sabre events held) but has been held at every Summer Olympics since 1900.

Three of the eight quarterfinalists from 1984 returned: two-time bronze medalist Philippe Riboud of France and fifth-place finishers Alexander Pusch of West Germany and Michel Poffet of Switzerland. Pusch had previously won gold in 1976 (not competing in 1980 due to his country joining the American-led boycott). Riboud had won the World Championship in 1979 and 1986. The reigning World Champion, Volker Fischer, competed on the West German team in the team event but was not one of the nation's three fencers in the individual competition.

Aruba, Bahrain, Jordan, and Paraguay each made their debut in the event. Belgium, France, Great Britain, Sweden, and the United States each appeared for the 18th time, tied for most among nations.

== Competition format ==
The 1988 tournament used a three-phase format very similar to that of 1984, though the second phase (double elimination) round expanded from 16 to 32 fencers.

The first phase was a multi-round round-robin pool play format; each fencer in a pool faced each other fencer in that pool once. There were three pool rounds:

- The first round had 15 pools of 5 or 6 fencers each, with the top 4 in each pool advancing.
- The second round had 12 pools of 5 fencers each, with the top 4 in each pool advancing.
- The third round had 8 pools of 6 fencers each, with the top 4 in each pool advancing.

The second phase was a truncated double-elimination tournament. Four fencers advanced to the final round through the winners brackets and four more advanced via the repechage.

The final phase was a single elimination tournament with a bronze medal match.

Bouts in the round-robin pools were to 5 touches; bouts in the double-elimination and final rounds were to 10 touches.

== Schedule ==
All times are Korea Standard Time adjusted for daylight savings (UTC+10)

Date	Time	Round
Friday, 23 September 1988	8:30; 13:00; 15:00	Round 1 Round 2 Round 3
Wednesday, 21 September 1988	14:00	Double elimination round Quarterfinals; Semifinals; Bronze medal match Final

== Results ==
=== Round 1 ===
==== Round 1 Pool A ====
Pos	Fencer	W	L	TF	TA	Notes	AM	ZS	ST	YAM	ZEK
1	Angelo Mazzoni (ITA)	4	0	20	12	Q		5–4	5–4	5–4	5–0
2	Zoltán Székely (HUN)	3	1	19	14	Q	4–5		5–4	5–3	5–2
3	Stephen Trevor (USA)	2	2	18	16	Q	4–5	4–5		5–2	5–4
4	Younes Al-Mashmoum (KUW)	1	3	14	15	Q	4–5	3–5	2–5		5–0
5	Zahi El-Khoury (LIB)	0	4	6	20		0–5	2–5	4–5	0–5	

Source: Official Report, vol. 2, p. 383

==== Round 1 Pool B ====
Pos	Fencer	W	L	TF	TA	Notes	SC	RL	AK	SG	ÓP
1	Sandro Cuomo (ITA)	4	0	20	7	Q		5–3	5–2	5–2	5–0
2	Roberto Lazzarini (BRA)	3	1	18	9	Q	3–5		5–1	5–1	5–2
3	André Kuhn (SUI)	2	2	13	17	Q	2–5	1–5		5–4	5–3
4	Stéphane Ganeff (NED)	1	3	12	16	Q	2–5	1–5	4–5		5–1
5	Óscar Pinto (POR)	0	4	6	20		0–5	2–5	3–5	1–5	

Source: Official Report, vol. 2, p. 383

==== Round 1 Pool C ====
Pos	Fencer	W	L	TF	TA	Notes	JMH	LIH	FdlP	RD	RM
1	Jean-Michel Henry (FRA)	4	0	20	8	Q		5–2	5–1	5–1	5–4
2	Lee Il-Hui (KOR)	3	1	17	13	Q	2–5		5–2	5–3	5–3
3	Fernando de la Peña (ESP)	2	2	13	16	Q	1–5	2–5		5–2	5–4
4	Roberto Durão (POR)	1	3	11	20	Q	1–5	3–5	2–5		5.1–5
5	Robert Marx (USA)	0	4	16	20		4–5	3–5	4–5	5–5.1	

Source: Official Report, vol. 2, p. 383

==== Round 1 Pool D ====
Pos	Fencer	W	L	TF	TA	Notes	OD	AS	AM	RD	WST
1	Otto Drakenberg (SWE)	3	1	17	12	Q		5–2	2–5	5–2	5–3
2	Andrey Shuvalov (URS)	3	1	17	13	Q	2–5		5–3	5–2	5–3
3	Antônio Machado (BRA)	2	2	16	12	Q	5–2	3–5		3–5	5–0
4	Robert Davidson (AUS)	2	2	14	15	Q	2–5	2–5	5–3		5–2
5	Wang San-Tsai (TPE)	0	4	8	20		3–5	3–5	0–5	2–5	

Source: Official Report, vol. 2, p. 383

==== Round 1 Pool E ====
Pos	Fencer	W	L	TF	TA	Notes	ES	MR	ST	MAH	MD
1	Éric Srecki (FRA)	4	0	20	12	Q		5–4	5–1	5–3	5–4
2	Mauricio Rivas (COL)	3	1	19	9	Q	4–5		5–0	5–1	5–3
3	Sergio Turiace (ARG)	2	2	11	17	Q	1–5	0–5		5–4	5–3
4	Mohamed Al-Hamar (KUW)	1	3	13	18	Q	3–5	1–5	4–5		5–3
5	Michiel Driessen (NED)	0	4	13	20		4–5	3–5	3–5	3–5	

Source: Official Report, vol. 2, p. 383

==== Round 1 Pool F ====
Pos	Fencer	W	L	TF	TA	Notes	AP	YNJ	LC	RS	MY
1	Alexander Pusch (FRG)	4	0	20	6	Q		5–3	5–1	5–1	5–1
2	Yun Nam-jin (KOR)	2	2	18	14	Q	3–5		5–3	5–5	5–1
3	Ludomir Chronowski (POL)	2	2	14	12	Q	1–5	3–5		5–1	5–1
4	Rob Stull (USA)	1	3	12	17	Q	1–5	5–5	1–5		5–2
5	Michel Youssef (LIB)	0	4	5	20		1–5	1–5	1–5	2–5	

Source: Official Report, vol. 2, p. 383

==== Round 1 Pool G ====
Pos	Fencer	W	L	TF	TA	Notes	TG	JB	EK	JP	MP
1	Thomas Gerull (FRG)	3	1	19	14	Q		5–3	4–5	5–4	5–2
2	Jerri Bergström (SWE)	2	2	18	15	Q	3–5		5–5	5–3	5–2
3	Ernő Kolczonay (HUN)	2	2	19	18	Q	5–4	5–5		4–5	5–4
4	Joaquin Pinto (COL)	1	3	16	19	Q	4–5	3–5	5–4		4–5
5	Manuel Pereira (ESP)	1	3	13	19		2–5	2–5	4–5	5–4	

Source: Official Report, vol. 2, p. 383

==== Round 1 Pool H ====
Pos	Fencer	W	L	TF	TA	Notes	EK	PV	JMP	DZ	JMC
1	Szabolcs Pásztor (HUN)	3	1	19	14	Q		5–2	4–5	5–3	5–4
2	Péter Vánky (SWE)	2	2	16	16	Q	2–5		5–3	4–5	5–3
3	Juan Miguel Paz (COL)	2	2	17	19	Q	5–4	3–5		5.1–5	4–5
4	Du Zhencheng (CHN)	1	3	18	19	Q	3–5	5–4	5–5.1		5–5
5	Jean-Marc Chouinard (CAN)	1	3	17	19		4–5	3–5	5–4	5–5	

Source: Official Report, vol. 2, p. 383

==== Round 1 Pool I ====
Pos	Fencer	W	L	TF	TA	Notes	WR	LSG	SJ	AS	AA
1	Wladimir Resnitschenko (URS)	4	0	20	9	Q		5–4	5–1	5–2	5–2
2	Lee Sang-Gi (KOR)	2	2	18	11	Q	4–5		4–5	5–1	5–0
3	Stefan Joos (BEL)	2	2	15	14	Q	1–5	5–4		4–5	5–0
4	Arno Strohmeyer (AUT)	2	2	13	18	Q	2–5	1–5	5–4		5–4
5	Ali Abuzamia (JOR)	0	4	6	20		2–5	0–5	0–5	4–5	

Source: Official Report, vol. 2, p. 383

==== Round 1 Pool J ====
Pos	Fencer	W	L	TF	TA	Notes	PR	JL	WG	PG	TKK
1	Philippe Riboud (FRA)	4	0	20	8	Q		5–3	5–0	5–3	5–2
2	John Llewellyn (GBR)	2	2	16	16	Q	3–5		3–5	5–3	5–3
3	Witold Gadomski (POL)	2	2	11	15	Q	0–5	5–3		5–2	1–5
4	Patrice Gaille (SUI)	1	3	13	15	Q	3–5	3–5	2–5		5–0
5	Tong King King (HKG)	1	3	10	16		2–5	3–5	5–1	0–5	

Source: Official Report, vol. 2, p. 383

==== Round 1 Pool K ====
Pos	Fencer	W	L	TF	TA	Notes	LW	PR	MB	AB	AT	TWK
1	Lars Winter (FIN)	4	1	24	10	Q		5–1	5–4	4–5	5–0	5–0
2	Mykhailo Tyshko (URS)	4	1	21	12	Q	1–5		5–0	5–3	5–3	5–1
3	Martin Brill (NZL)	3	2	19	13	Q	4–5	0–5		5–1	5–0	5–2
4	Axel Birnbaum (AUT)	3	2	19	20	Q	5–4	3–5	1–5		5–2	5–4
5	Austin Thomas (ARU)	1	4	10	24		0–5	3–5	0–5	2–5		5–4
6	Tang Wing Keung (HKG)	0	5	11	25		0–5	1–5	2–5	4–5	4–5	

Source: Official Report, vol. 2, p. 383

==== Round 1 Pool L ====
Pos	Fencer	W	L	TF	TA	Notes	MP	UP	TS	CKS	ARK
1	Michel Poffet (SUI)	4	0	20	5	Q		5–2	5–2	5–1	5–1
2	Uwe Proske (GDR)	2	2	14	11	Q	2–5		5–1	5–0	2–5
3	Thierry Soumagne (BEL)	2	2	13	14	Q	2–5	1–5		5–4	5–0
4	Chan Kai Sang (HKG)	1	3	10	16	Q	1–5	0–5	4–5		5–1
5	Abdul Rahman Khalid (BRN)	1	3	6	17		1–5	5–2	0–5	1–5	

Source: Official Report, vol. 2, p. 383

==== Round 1 Pool M ====
Pos	Fencer	W	L	TF	TA	Notes	SP	JN	MD	HK	KJ	SF
1	Stefano Pantano (ITA)	4	1	24	11	Q		5–2	5–1	5–3	4–5	5–0
2	Johannes Nagele (AUT)	4	1	22	17	Q	2–5		5–4	5–2	5–2	5–4
3	Michel Dessureault (CAN)	2	3	18	20	Q	1–5	4–5		5–3	5–2	3–5
4	Hugh Kernohan (GBR)	2	3	18	22	Q	3–5	2–5	3–5		5–3	5–4
5	Khaled Jahrami (KUW)	2	3	17	22		5–4	2–5	2–5	3–5		5–3
6	Saleh Farhan (BRN)	1	4	16	23		0–5	4–5	5–3	4–5	3–5	

Source: Official Report, vol. 2, p. 383

==== Round 1 Pool N ====
Pos	Fencer	W	L	TF	TA	Notes	TK	MZ	DF	AF	AC	AAD
1	Torsten Kühnemund (GDR)	3	2	21	17	Q		3–5	5–4	5–1	3–5	5–2
2	Ma Zhi (CHN)	3	2	22	19	Q	5–3		5–5.1	2–5	5–2	5–4
3	Douglas Fonseca (BRA)	3	2	23	21	Q	4–5	5.1–5		5–3	4–5	5–3
4	Ángel Fernández (ESP)	2	3	19	18	Q	1–5	5–2	3–5		5–5	5–1
5	Alain Côté (CAN)	2	3	21	22		5–3	2–5	5–4	5–5		4–5
6	Ahmed Al-Doseri (BRN)	1	4	15	24		2–5	4–5	3–5	1–5	5–4	

Source: Official Report, vol. 2, p. 383

==== Round 1 Pool O ====
Pos	Fencer	W	L	TF	TA	Notes	AS	AK	RdT	CS	JB	AB
1	Arnd Schmitt (FRG)	3	2	23	12	Q		5–5	3–5	5–1	5–1	5–0
2	Arwin Kardolus (NED)	3	2	23	15	Q	5–5		5–0	3–5	5–3	5–2
3	Rafael di Tella (ARG)	3	2	20	17	Q	5–3	0–5		5–3	5–5	5–1
4	Cezary Siess (POL)	3	2	19	19	Q	1–5	5–3	3–5		5–3	5–3
5	José Bandeira (POR)	1	4	17	23		1–5	3–5	5–5	3–5		5–3
6	Alfredo Bogarín (PAR)	0	5	9	25		0–5	2–5	1–5	3–5	3–5	

Source: Official Report, vol. 2, p. 383

=== Round 2 ===
==== Round 2 Pool A ====
Pos	Fencer	W	L	TF	TA	Notes	TK	MP	MD	RdT	AF
1	Torsten Kühnemund (GDR)	4	0	20	8	Q		5–3	5–1	5–2	5–2
2	Michel Poffet (SUI)	3	1	18	15	Q	3–5		5–3	5–4	5–3
3	Michel Dessureault (CAN)	1	3	14	17	Q	1–5	3–5		5–2	5–5.1
4	Rafael di Tella (ARG)	1	3	13	18	Q	2–5	4–5	2–5		5–3
5	Ángel Fernández (ESP)	1	3	13	20		2–5	3–5	5.1–5	3–5	

Source: Official Report, vol. 2, p. 384

==== Round 2 Pool B ====
Pos	Fencer	W	L	TF	TA	Notes	AP	MB	MZ	AS	ST
1	Alexander Pusch (FRG)	3	1	16	16	Q		5–2	1–5	5–1	5–2
2	Martin Brill (NZL)	3	1	17	17	Q	2–5		5–2	5–4	5–4
3	Ma Zhi (CHN)	2	2	16	13	Q	5–1	2–5		4–5	5–2
4	Arno Strohmeyer (AUT)	2	2	15	15	Q	1–4	4–5	5–4		5–1
5	Sergio Turiace (ARG)	0	4	9	20		2–5	4–5	2–5	1–5	

Source: Official Report, vol. 2, p. 384

==== Round 2 Pool C ====
Pos	Fencer	W	L	TF	TA	Notes	WG	AK	SC	DF	HK
1	Witold Gadomski (POL)	3	1	18	13	Q		3–5	5–4	5–4	5–0
2	Arwin Kardolus (NED)	3	1	15	14	Q	5–3		5–4	5–2	0–5
3	Sandro Cuomo (ITA)	2	2	18	13	Q	4–5	4–5		5–2	5–1
4	Douglas Fonseca (BRA)	1	3	13	18	Q	4–5	2–5	2–5		5–3
5	Hugh Kernohan (GBR)	1	3	9	15		0–5	5–0	1–5	3–5	

Source: Official Report, vol. 2, p. 384

==== Round 2 Pool D ====
Pos	Fencer	W	L	TF	TA	Notes	AS	JMH	AK	CS	YAM
1	Arnd Schmitt (FRG)	4	0	20	14	Q		5–4	5–2	5–4	5–4
2	Jean-Michel Henry (FRA)	3	1	19	12	Q	4–5		5–4	5–2	5–1
3	André Kuhn (SUI)	2	2	16	15	Q	2–5	4–5		5–1	5–4
4	Cezary Siess (POL)	1	3	12	19	Q	4–5	2–5	1–5		5–4
5	Younes Al-Mashmoum (KUW)	0	4	13	20		4–5	1–5	4–5	4–5	

Source: Official Report, vol. 2, p. 384

==== Round 2 Pool E ====
Pos	Fencer	W	L	TF	TA	Notes	AS	PR	AB	DZ	FdlP
1	Andrey Shuvalov (URS)	4	0	20	11	Q		5–3	5–1	5–3	5–4
2	Philippe Riboud (FRA)	3	1	18	10	Q	3–5		5–1	5–2	5–2
3	Axel Birnbaum (AUT)	2	2	12	15	Q	1–5	1–5		5–3	5–2
4	Du Zhencheng (CHN)	1	3	13	18	Q	3–5	2–5	3–5		5–3
5	Fernando de la Peña (ESP)	0	4	11	20		4–5	2–5	2–5	3–5	

Source: Official Report, vol. 2, p. 384

==== Round 2 Pool F ====
Pos	Fencer	W	L	TF	TA	Notes	PG	WR	AM	JMP	LIH
1	Patrice Gaille (SUI)	3	1	19	12	Q		5–2	5–2	5–3	4–5
2	Wladimir Resnitschenko (URS)	3	1	17	14	Q	2–5		5–4	5–2	5–3
3	Antônio Machado (BRA)	2	2	16	16	Q	2–5	4–5		5–3	5–3
4	Juan Miguel Paz (COL)	1	3	13	17	Q	3–5	2–5	3–5		5–2
5	Lee Il-Hui (KOR)	1	3	13	19		5–4	3–5	3–5	2–5	

Source: Official Report, vol. 2, p. 384

==== Round 2 Pool G ====
Pos	Fencer	W	L	TF	TA	Notes	ES	SP	LSG	JP	RD
1	Éric Srecki (FRA)	4	0	20	10	Q		5–2	5–4	5–4	5–0
2	Szabolcs Pásztor (HUN)	3	1	17	14	Q	2–5		5–4	5–1	5–4
3	Lee Sang-Gi (KOR)	2	2	18	15	Q	4–5	4–5		5–1	5–4
4	Joaquin Pinto (COL)	1	3	11	19	Q	4–5	1–5	1–5		5–4
5	Robert Davidson (AUS)	0	4	12	20		0–5	4–5	4–5	4–5	

Source: Official Report, vol. 2, p. 384

==== Round 2 Pool H ====
Pos	Fencer	W	L	TF	TA	Notes	AM	YNJ	SG	TG	TS
1	Angelo Mazzoni (ITA)	3	1	19	9	Q		5–2	4–5	5–2	5–0
2	Yun Nam-jin (KOR)	2	2	14	13	Q	2–5		5–2	2–5	5–1
3	Stéphane Ganeff (NED)	2	2	16	15	Q	5–4	2–5		5–1	4–5
4	Thomas Gerull (FRG)	2	2	13	14	Q	2–5	5–2	1–5		5–2
5	Thierry Soumagne (BEL)	1	3	8	19		0–5	1–5	5–4	2–5	

Source: Official Report, vol. 2, p. 384

==== Round 2 Pool I ====
Pos	Fencer	W	L	TF	TA	Notes	ZS	RS	PV	UP	LW
1	Zoltán Székely (HUN)	3	1	19	12	Q		5–2	5–2	4–5	5–3
2	Rob Stull (USA)	3	1	17	14	Q	2–5		5–4	5–2	5–3
3	Péter Vánky (SWE)	2	2	16	15	Q	2–5	4–5		5–4	5–1
4	Uwe Proske (GDR)	2	2	16	16	Q	5–4	2–5	4–5		5–2
5	Lars Winter (FIN)	0	4	9	20		3–5	3–5	1–5	2–5	

Source: Official Report, vol. 2, p. 384

==== Round 2 Pool J ====
Pos	Fencer	W	L	TF	TA	Notes	LC	JL	SP	MAH	OD
1	Ludomir Chronowski (POL)	4	0	20	13	Q		5–4	5–4	5–2	5–3
2	John Llewellyn (GBR)	3	1	19	13	Q	4–5		5–4	5–1	5–3
3	Stefano Pantano (ITA)	2	2	18	19	Q	4–5	4–5		5–4	5.1–5
4	Mohamed Al-Hamar (KUW)	1	3	12	16	Q	2–5	1–5	4–5		5–1
5	Otto Drakenberg (SWE)	0	4	12	20		3–5	3–5	5–5.1	1–5	

Source: Official Report, vol. 2, p. 385

==== Round 2 Pool K ====
Pos	Fencer	W	L	TF	TA	Notes	EK	JB	MT	RL	CKS
1	Ernő Kolczonay (HUN)	3	1	19	10	Q		5–0	4–5	5–1	5–4
2	Jerri Bergström (SWE)	3	1	15	10	Q	0–5		5–3	5–2	5–0
3	Mykhailo Tyshko (URS)	3	1	18	13	Q	5–4	3–5		5–2	5–2
4	Roberto Lazzarini (BRA)	1	3	10	17	Q	1–5	2–5	2–5		5–2
5	Chan Kai Sang (HKG)	0	4	8	20		4–5	0–5	2–5	2–5	

Source: Official Report, vol. 2, p. 385

==== Round 2 Pool L ====
Pos	Fencer	W	L	TF	TA	Notes	ST	SJ	MR	JN	RD
1	Stephen Trevor (USA)	4	0	20	6	Q		5–2	5–0	5–2	5–2
2	Stefan Joos (BEL)	3	1	17	11	Q	2–5		5–2	5–3	5–1
3	Mauricio Rivas (COL)	2	2	12	12	Q	0–5	2–5		5–0	5–2
4	Johannes Nagele (AUT)	1	3	10	17	Q	2–5	3–5	0–5		5–2
5	Roberto Durão (POR)	0	4	7	20		2–5	1–5	2–5	2–5	

Source: Official Report, vol. 2, p. 385

=== Round 3 ===
==== Round 3 Pool A ====
Pos	Fencer	W	L	TF	TA	Notes	JB	MT	AS	MR	ST	CS
1	Jerri Bergström (SWE)	5	0	25	11	Q		5–4	5–3	5–2	5–2	5–0
2	Mykhailo Tyshko (URS)	3	2	22	18	Q	4–5		5–4	3–5	5–1	5–3
3	Arno Strohmeyer (AUT)	3	2	22	20	Q	3–5	4–5		5–3	5–3	5–4
4	Mauricio Rivas (COL)	2	3	19	22	Q	2–5	5–3	3–5		5–4	4–5
5	Stephen Trevor (USA)	1	4	15	21		2–5	1–5	3–5	4–5		5–1
6	Cezary Siess (POL)	1	4	13	24		0–5	3–5	4–5	5–4	1–5	

Source: Official Report, vol. 2, p. 385

==== Round 3 Pool B ====
Pos	Fencer	W	L	TF	TA	Notes	TK	WG	AM	SG	JL	JP
1	Torsten Kühnemund (GDR)	5	0	25	8	Q		5–4	5–2	5–2	5–0	5–0
2	Witold Gadomski (POL)	3	2	24	21	Q	4–5		5–4	5–3	5–5	5–4
3	Antônio Machado (BRA)	2	3	19	19	Q	2–5	4–5		5–2	3–5	5–2
4	Stéphane Ganeff (NED)	2	3	17	19	Q	2–5	3–5	2–5		5–3	5–1
5	John Llewellyn (GBR)	1	4	17	23		0–5	5–5	5–3	3–5		4–5
6	Joaquin Pinto (COL)	1	4	12	24		0–5	4–5	2–5	1–5	5–4	

Source: Official Report, vol. 2, p. 385

==== Round 3 Pool C ====
Pos	Fencer	W	L	TF	TA	Notes	ES	PV	SJ	WR	UP	RL
1	Éric Srecki (FRA)	5	0	25	17	Q		5–4	5–3	5–4	5–4	5–2
2	Péter Vánky (SWE)	3	2	23	20	Q	4–5		5–4	5–4	5–2	4–5
3	Stefan Joos (BEL)	2	3	19	17	Q	3–5	4–5		5–1	2–5	5–1
4	Wladimir Resnitschenko (URS)	2	3	19	18	Q	4–5	4–5	1–5		5–1	5–2
5	Uwe Proske (GDR)	2	3	17	21		4–5	2–5	5–2	1–5		5–4
6	Roberto Lazzarini (BRA)	1	4	14	24		2–5	5–4	1–5	2–5	4–5	

Source: Official Report, vol. 2, p. 385

==== Round 3 Pool D ====
Pos	Fencer	W	L	TF	TA	Notes	AS	SPan	AP	JN	SPás	AK
1	Andrey Shuvalov (URS)	5	0	25	14	Q		5–4	5–2	5–2	5–4	5–2
2	Stefano Pantano (ITA)	4	1	24	19	Q	4–5		5–4	5–3	5.1–5	5–2
3	Alexander Pusch (FRG)	3	2	21	18	Q	2–5	4–5		5–0	5–4	5–4
4	Johannes Nagele (AUT)	2	3	15	24	Q	2–5	3–5	0–5		5.1–5	5–4
5	Szabolcs Pásztor (HUN)	1	4	23	23		4–5	5–5.1	4–5	5–5.1		5–3
6	André Kuhn (SUI)	0	5	15	25		2–5	2–5	4–5	4–5	3–5	

Source: Official Report, vol. 2, p. 385

==== Round 3 Pool E ====
Pos	Fencer	W	L	TF	TA	Notes	JMH	YNJ	TG	DZ	LC	RS
1	Jean-Michel Henry (FRA)	4	1	21	14	Q		1–5	5–2	5–4	5–2	5–1
2	Yun Nam-jin (KOR)	4	1	21	19	Q	5–1		5–4	5–4	1–5	5.1–5
3	Thomas Gerull (FRG)	3	2	21	20	Q	2–5	4–5		5–3	5–3	5–4
4	Du Zhencheng (CHN)	2	3	21	18	Q	4–5	4–5	3–5		5–1	5–2
5	Ludomir Chronowski (POL)	2	3	16	18		2–5	5–1	3–5	1–5		5–2
6	Rob Stull (USA)	0	5	14	25		1–5	5–5.1	4–5	2–5	2–5	

Source: Official Report, vol. 2, p. 385

==== Round 3 Pool F ====
Pos	Fencer	W	L	TF	TA	Notes	AS	LSG	ZS	MP	RdT	AB
1	Arnd Schmitt (FRG)	4	1	22	10	Q		2–5	5–2	5–2	5–1	5–0
2	Lee Sang-Gi (KOR)	4	1	25	13	Q	5–2		5–4	5–1	5–5	5–1
3	Zoltán Székely (HUN)	3	2	21	19	Q	2–5	4–5		5–3	5–4	5–2
4	Michel Poffet (SUI)	2	3	16	20	Q	2–5	1–5	3–5		5–3	5–2
5	Rafael di Tella (ARG)	1	4	18	24		1–5	5–5	4–5	3–5		5–4
6	Axel Birnbaum (AUT)	0	5	9	25		0–5	1–5	2–5	2–5	4–5	

Source: Official Report, vol. 2, p. 385

==== Round 3 Pool G ====
Pos	Fencer	W	L	TF	TA	Notes	MB	AM	MD	PG	DF	MZ
1	Martin Brill (NZL)	3	2	23	18	Q		5–3	5–3	4–5	4–5	5–2
2	Angelo Mazzoni (ITA)	3	2	20	17	Q	3–5		5–3	5–4	5–0	2–5
3	Michel Dessureault (CAN)	3	2	21	19	Q	3–5	3–5		5–4	5–1	5–4
4	Patrice Gaille (SUI)	3	2	23	21	Q	5–4	4–5	4–5		5–4	5–3
5	Douglas Fonseca (BRA)	2	3	15	23		5–4	0–5	1–5	4–5		5–4
6	Ma Zhi (CHN)	1	4	18	22		2–5	5–2	4–5	3–5	4–5	

Source: Official Report, vol. 2, p. 385

==== Round 3 Pool H ====
Pos	Fencer	W	L	TF	TA	Notes	PR	AK	SC	EK	JMP	MAH
1	Philippe Riboud (FRA)	5	0	25	11	Q		5–2	5–2	5–3	5–1	5–3
2	Arwin Kardolus (NED)	3	2	19	16	Q	2–5		2–5	5–4	5–2	5–0
3	Sandro Cuomo (ITA)	3	2	20	17	Q	2–5	5–2		5–1	5–4	3–5
4	Ernő Kolczonay (HUN)	2	3	18	20	Q	3–5	4–5	1–5		5–3	5–2
5	Juan Miguel Paz (COL)	1	4	15	21		1–5	2–5	4–5	3–5		5–1
6	Mohamed Al-Hamar (KUW)	1	4	11	23		3–5	0–5	5–3	2–5	1–5	

Source: Official Report, vol. 2, p. 385

=== Double elimination rounds ===
==== Winners brackets ====
===== Winners group 1 =====
Round of 32		Round of 16		Round of 8
Torsten Kühnemund (GDR)	10
Johannes Nagele (AUT)	3	Torsten Kühnemund (GDR)	10
Stefan Joos (BEL)	10	Stefan Joos (BEL)	6
Arwin Kardolus (NED)	9			Torsten Kühnemund (GDR)	10
Angelo Mazzoni (ITA)	7			Arno Strohmeyer (AUT)	7
Arno Strohmeyer (AUT)	10	Arno Strohmeyer (AUT)	10
Thomas Gerull (FRG)	9	Lee Sang-Gi (KOR)	7
Lee Sang-Gi (KOR)	10

===== Winners group 2 =====
Round of 32		Round of 16		Round of 8
Jerri Bergström (SWE)	10
Stéphane Ganeff (NED)	8	Jerri Bergström (SWE)	10
Ernő Kolczonay (HUN)	10	Ernő Kolczonay (HUN)	6
Mykhailo Tyshko (URS)	9			Jerri Bergström (SWE)	10
Patrice Gaille (SUI)	7			Philippe Riboud (FRA)	8
Sandro Cuomo (ITA)	10	Sandro Cuomo (ITA)	8
Michel Dessureault (CAN)	3	Philippe Riboud (FRA)	10
Philippe Riboud (FRA)	10

===== Winners group 3 =====
Round of 32		Round of 16		Round of 8
Éric Srecki (FRA)	6
Mauricio Rivas (COL)	10	Mauricio Rivas (COL)	10
Yun Nam-jin (KOR)	6	Witold Gadomski (POL)	5
Witold Gadomski (POL)	10			Mauricio Rivas (COL)	5
Zoltán Székely (HUN)	5			Wladimir Resnitschenko (URS)	10
Wladimir Resnitschenko (URS)	10	Wladimir Resnitschenko (URS)	10
Antônio Machado (BRA)	9	Arnd Schmitt (FRG)	9
Arnd Schmitt (FRG)	10

===== Winners group 4 =====
Round of 32		Round of 16		Round of 8
Jean-Michel Henry (FRA)	4
Michel Poffet (SUI)	10	Michel Poffet (SUI)	4
Péter Vánky (SWE)	5	Alexander Pusch (FRG)	10
Alexander Pusch (FRG)	10			Alexander Pusch (FRG)	6
Martin Brill (NZL)	10			Andrey Shuvalov (URS)	10
Stefano Pantano (ITA)	8	Martin Brill (NZL)	9
Du Zhencheng (CHN)	6	Andrey Shuvalov (URS)	10
Andrey Shuvalov (URS)	10

==== Repechages ====
===== Repechage 1 =====
Round of 16
Johannes Nagele (AUT)	10
Arwin Kardolus (NED)	7
Éric Srecki (FRA)	10
Yun Nam-jin (KOR)	2

Round of 8
Johannes Nagele (AUT)	2
Arnd Schmitt (FRG)	10
Éric Srecki (FRA)	5
Michel Poffet (SUI)	10

Round of 4
Arnd Schmitt (FRG)	10
Michel Poffet (SUI)	8

Round of 2
Arnd Schmitt (FRG)	10
Mauricio Rivas (COL)	2

===== Repechage 2 =====
Round of 16
Patrice Gaille (SUI)	10
Michel Dessureault (CAN)	9
Angelo Mazzoni (ITA)	6
Thomas Gerull (FRG)	10

Round of 8
Patrice Gaille (SUI)	10
Stefan Joos (BEL)	5
Thomas Gerull (FRG)	7
Martin Brill (NZL)	10

Round of 4
Patrice Gaille (SUI)	5
Martin Brill (NZL)	10

Round of 2
Martin Brill (NZL)	10
Arno Strohmeyer (AUT)	7

===== Repechage 3 =====
Round of 16
Stefano Pantano (ITA)	10
Du Zhencheng (CHN)	4
Zoltán Székely (HUN)	10
Antônio Machado (BRA)	5

Round of 8
Stefano Pantano (ITA)	10
Witold Gadomski (POL)	5
Zoltán Székely (HUN)	9
Sandro Cuomo (ITA)	10

Round of 4
Stefano Pantano (ITA)	5
Sandro Cuomo (ITA)	10

Round of 2
Sandro Cuomo (ITA)	10
Alexander Pusch (FRG)	4

===== Repechage 4 =====
Round of 16
Jean-Michel Henry (FRA)	10
Péter Vánky (SWE)	4
Stéphane Ganeff (NED)	10
Mykhailo Tyshko (URS)	4

Round of 8
Jean-Michel Henry (FRA)	8
Ernő Kolczonay (HUN)	10
Stéphane Ganeff (NED)	10
Lee Sang-Gi (KOR)	4

Round of 4
Ernő Kolczonay (HUN)	10
Stéphane Ganeff (NED)	9

Round of 2
Ernő Kolczonay (HUN)	6
Philippe Riboud (FRA)	10

=== Final round ===
Quarterfinals
Torsten Kühnemund (GDR)	5
Sandro Cuomo (ITA)	10
Philippe Riboud (FRA)	10
Wladimir Resnitschenko (URS)	9
Jerri Bergström (SWE)	7
Arnd Schmitt (FRG)	10
Martin Brill (NZL)	3
Andrey Shuvalov (URS)	10

Semifinals
Sandro Cuomo (ITA)	4
Philippe Riboud (FRA)	10
Arnd Schmitt (FRG)	10
Andrey Shuvalov (URS)	9

Finals
Philippe Riboud (FRA)	9
Arnd Schmitt (FRG)	10
Third place
Sandro Cuomo (ITA)	8
Andrey Shuvalov (URS)	10

== Final classification ==
Fencer	Nation
Arnd Schmitt	West Germany
Philippe Riboud	France
Andrey Shuvalov	Soviet Union
Sandro Cuomo	Italy
Torsten Kühnemund	East Germany
Jerri Bergström	Sweden
Martin Brill	New Zealand
Wladimir Resnitschenko	Soviet Union
Alexander Pusch	West Germany
Ernő Kolczonay	Hungary
Arno Strohmeyer	Austria
Mauricio Rivas	Colombia
Patrice Gaille	Switzerland
Stefano Pantano	Italy
Michel Poffet	Switzerland
Stéphane Ganeff	Netherlands
Éric Srecki	France
Jean-Michel Henry	France
Lee Sang-Gi	South Korea
Zoltán Székely	Hungary
Witold Gadomski	Poland
Stefan Joos	Belgium
Thomas Gerull	West Germany
Johannes Nagele	Austria
Angelo Mazzoni	Italy
Mykhailo Tyshko	Soviet Union
Arwin Kardolus	Netherlands
Yun Nam-jin	South Korea
Péter Vánky	Sweden
Antônio Machado	Brazil
Michel Dessureault	Canada
Du Zhencheng	China
Ludomir Chronowski	Poland
Uwe Proske	East Germany
Douglas Fonseca	Brazil
Szabolcs Pásztor	Hungary
Ma Zhi	China
Juan Miguel Paz	Colombia
Stephen Trevor	United States
John Llewellyn	Great Britain
Rafael di Tella	Argentina
Roberto Lazzarini	Brazil
Cezary Siess	Poland
Mohamed Al-Hamar	Kuwait
Joaquin Pinto	Colombia
André Kuhn	Switzerland
Rob Stull	United States
Axel Birnbaum	Austria
Hugh Kernohan	Great Britain
Lee Il-Hui	South Korea
Ángel Fernández	Spain
Thierry Soumagne	Belgium
Younes Al-Mashmoum	Kuwait
Robert Davidson	Australia
Otto Drakenberg	Sweden
Fernando de la Peña	Spain
Sergio Turiace	Argentina
Lars Winter	Finland
Chan Kai Sang	Hong Kong
Roberto Durão	Portugal
Alain Côté	Canada
Khaled Jahrami	Kuwait
Jean-Marc Chouinard	Canada
Tong King King	Hong Kong
Manuel Pereira	Spain
Abdul Rahman Khalid	Bahrain
José Bandeira	Portugal
Saleh Farhan	Bahrain
Ahmed Al-Doseri	Bahrain
Austin Thomas	Aruba
Robert Marx	United States
Michiel Driessen	Netherlands
Wang San-Tsai	Chinese Taipei
Zahi El-Khoury	Lebanon
Óscar Pinto	Portugal
Ali Abuzamia	Jordan
Tang Wing Keung	Hong Kong
Michel Youssef	Lebanon
Alfredo Bogarín	Paraguay
