= Fencing at the 1988 Summer Olympics – Men's team épée =

Men's team épée at the Games of the XXIV Olympiad
- Venue: Olympic Fencing Gymnasium
- Dates: 29–30 September 1988
- Competitors: 85 from 18 nations

Medalists
1st place, gold medalist(s)		Frédéric Delpla; Jean-Michel Henry; Olivier Lenglet; Philippe Riboud; Éric Srecki	France
2nd place, silver medalist(s)		Elmar Borrmann; Volker Fischer; Thomas Gerull; Alexander Pusch; Arnd Schmitt	West Germany
3rd place, bronze medalist(s)		Andrey Shuvalov; Pavel Kolobkov; Wladimir Resnitschenko; Mykhailo Tyshko; Igor Tikhomirov	Soviet Union

The men's team épée was one of eight fencing events on the fencing at the 1988 Summer Olympics programme. It was the eighteenth appearance of the event. The competition was held from 29 to 30 September 1988. 85 fencers from 18 nations competed.

== Rosters ==
Bahrain

- Ahmed Al-Doseri
- Saleh Farhan
- Abdul Rahman Khalid
- Khalifa Khamis

Brazil

- Régis Avila
- Douglas Fonseca
- Roberto Lazzarini
- Antônio Machado

Canada

- Ian Bramall
- Jean-Marc Chouinard
- Alain Côté
- Michel Dessureault
- Danek Nowosielski

Colombia

- Oscar Arango
- William González
- Juan Miguel Paz
- Joaquin Pinto
- Mauricio Rivas

France

- Frédéric Delpla
- Jean-Michel Henry
- Olivier Lenglet
- Philippe Riboud
- Éric Srecki

Hong Kong

- Chan Kai Sang
- Choy Kam Shing
- Tang Wing Keung
- Tong King King

Hungary

- László Fábián
- Ferenc Hegedűs
- Ernő Kolczonay
- Szabolcs Pásztor
- Zoltán Székely

Italy

- Stefano Bellone
- Andrea Bermond Des Ambros
- Sandro Cuomo
- Angelo Mazzoni
- Stefano Pantano

Kuwait

- Mohamed Al-Hamar
- Younes Al-Mashmoum
- Nahedh Al-Murdh
- Khaled Jahrami

Netherlands

- Paul Besselink
- Michiel Driessen
- Stéphane Ganeff
- Arwin Kardolus
- Olaf Kardolus

Poland

- Ludomir Chronowski
- Witold Gadomski
- Piotr Kiełpikowski
- Cezary Siess
- Bogusław Zych

South Korea

- Jo Hui-Je
- Lee Il-Hui
- Lee Sang-Gi
- Yang Dal-Sik
- Yun Nam-jin

Soviet Union

- Andrey Shuvalov
- Pavel Kolobkov
- Wladimir Resnitschenko
- Mykhailo Tyshko
- Igor Tikhomirov

Spain

- Ángel Fernández
- Oscar Fernández
- Raúl Maroto
- Fernando de la Peña
- Manuel Pereira

Sweden

- Johan Bergdahl
- Jerri Bergström
- Otto Drakenberg
- Ulf Sandegren
- Péter Vánky

Switzerland

- Patrice Gaille
- André Kuhn
- Zsolt Madarasz
- Gérald Pfefferle
- Michel Poffet

United States

- Robert Marx
- Lee Shelley
- Rob Stull
- Stephen Trevor

West Germany

- Elmar Borrmann
- Volker Fischer
- Thomas Gerull
- Alexander Pusch
- Arnd Schmitt

== Results ==
=== Round 1 ===
==== Round 1 Pool A ====
The United States and West Germany each defeated Brazil, 9–1 and 9–3 respectively. The winners then faced off, with West Germany winning 9–2.

Pos	Team	W	L	BW	BL	Qual.	FRG	USA	BRA
1	West Germany	2	0	18	5	QQ		9–2	9–3
2	United States	1	1	11	10	Q16	2–9		9–1
3	Brazil	0	2	4	18		3–9	1–9	

Source: Official Report, vol. 2, p. 397

==== Round 1 Pool B ====
Canada and the Soviet Union each defeated the Netherlands, 8–7 (one double-loss) and 8–1 (one double-loss) respectively. The winners then faced off, with the Soviet Union winning 9–3.

Pos	Team	W	L	BW	BL	Qual.	URS	CAN	NED
1	Soviet Union	2	0	17	5	QQ		9–3	8–1
2	Canada	1	1	11	17	Q16	3–9		8–7
3	Netherlands	0	2	8	18		1–8	7–8	

Source: Official Report, vol. 2, p. 397

==== Round 1 Pool C ====
Poland and France each defeated Kuwait, 9–1 and 9–0 respectively. The winners then faced off, with France winning 9–4.

Pos	Team	W	L	BW	BL	Qual.	FRA	POL	KUW
1	France	2	0	18	4	QQ		9–4	9–0
2	Poland	1	1	13	10	Q16	4–9		9–1
3	Kuwait	0	2	1	18		0–9	1–9	

Source: Official Report, vol. 2, p. 397

==== Round 1 Pool D ====
South Korea and Italy each defeated Spain, 9–7 and 8–5 (one double-loss) respectively. The winners then faced off, with Italy winning 8–6 (with an insurmountable 61–50 touch lead).

Pos	Team	W	L	BW	BL	Qual.	ITA	KOR	ESP
1	Italy	2	0	16	12	QQ		8–6	8–5
2	South Korea	1	1	15	15	Q16	6–8		9–7
3	Spain	0	2	12	18		5–8	7–9	

Source: Official Report, vol. 2, pp. 397–98

==== Round 1 Pool E ====
Colombia and Switzerland each defeated Hong Kong, 9–2 and 9–1 respectively. The winners then faced off, with Switzerland winning 8–7 (one double-loss).

Pos	Team	W	L	BW	BL	Qual.	SUI	COL	HKG
1	Switzerland	2	0	17	9	Q16		8–7	9–1
2	Colombia	1	1	16	11	Q16	7–8		9–2
3	Hong Kong	0	2	3	18		1–9	2–9	

Source: Official Report, vol. 2, p. 398

==== Round 1 Pool F ====
Sweden and Hungary each defeated Bahrain, 9–3 and 9–1 respectively. The winners then faced off, with Hungary winning 9–3.

Pos	Team	W	L	BW	BL	Qual.	HUN	SWE	BRN
1	Hungary	2	0	18	4	Q16		9–3	9–1
2	Sweden	1	1	12	12	Q16	3–9		9–3
3	Bahrain	0	2	4	18		1–9	3–9	

Source: Official Report, vol. 2, p. 398

=== Elimination rounds ===
==== Main bracket ====
First round
E2	Colombia	4
D2	South Korea	9
B2	Canada	6
E1	Switzerland	9
A2	United States	3
F1	Hungary	8
C2	Poland	6
F2	Sweden	9

Second round
A1	West Germany	8
D2	South Korea	6
E1	Switzerland	5
D1	Italy	9
C1	France	8
F1	Hungary	7
F2	Sweden	5
B1	Soviet Union	9

Semifinals
A1	West Germany	8
D1	Italy	7
C1	France	9
B1	Soviet Union	5

Finals
A1	West Germany	4
C1	France	8
Third place
D1	Italy	8
B1	Soviet Union	8

==== Consolation bracket ====
Semifinals
F2	Sweden	5
F1	Hungary	8
E1	Switzerland	8
D2	South Korea	8

Fifth place
F1	Hungary	4
E1	Switzerland	8
Seventh place
F2	Sweden	8
D2	South Korea	8
