= Colombia at the 1988 Summer Olympics =

- IOC code: COL
- NOC: Colombian Olympic Committee

in Seoul
- Competitors: 40 (34 men and 6 women) in 10 sports
- Flag bearer: Jorge Molina
- Medals Ranked 46th: Gold 0 Silver 0 Bronze 1 Total 1

Summer Olympics appearances (overview)
- 1932; 1936; 1948; 1952; 1956; 1960; 1964; 1968; 1972; 1976; 1980; 1984; 1988; 1992; 1996; 2000; 2004; 2008; 2012; 2016; 2020; 2024; 2028

Colombia competed at the 1988 Summer Olympics in Seoul, South Korea. 40 competitors, 34 men and 6 women, took part in 34 events in 10 sports.

== Medalists ==
Medal	Name	Sport	Event	Date
Bronze	Jorge Julio Rocha	Boxing	Bantamweight	29 September

== Competitors ==
The following is the list of number of competitors in the Games.

Sport	Men	Women	Total
Athletics	3	5	8
Boxing	2	–	2
Cycling	7	0	7
Equestrian	3	1	4
Fencing	5	0	5
Judo	3	–	3
Shooting	3	0	3
Swimming	1	0	1
Weightlifting	3	–	3
Wrestling	4	–	4
Total	34	6	40

== Athletics ==
Men
Track and road events

Athlete	Event	Heat		Final	
Athlete	Event	Time	Rank	Time	Rank
Pedro Ortiz	10,000 metres	29:08.25	27	Did not advance	
Pedro Ortiz	Marathon	—N/a		2:23:34	39
Héctor Moreno	20 kilometres walk	—N/a		1:27:06	33
Querubín Moreno	20 kilometres walk	—N/a		DNF	
Héctor Moreno	50 kilometres walk	—N/a		4:01:31	30

Women
Track and road events

Athlete	Event	Heat Round 1		Heat Round 2		Semifinal		Final	
Athlete	Event	Time	Rank	Time	Rank	Time	Rank	Time	Rank
Amparo Caicedo	100 metres	11.59	28 q	11.65	30	Did not advance			
Norfalia Carabalí	200 metres	23.78	31 Q	23.96	31	Did not advance			
Ximena Restrepo	200 metres	24.00	34	Did not advance					
Norfalia Carabalí	400 metres	53.27	24 Q	51.76	11 Q	52.65	16	Did not advance	
Amparo Caicedo; Norfalia Carabalí; Olga Escalante; Ximena Restrepo	4 × 100 metres relay	45.46	16 q	—N/a		DNS		Did not advance	
Amparo Caicedo; Norfalia Carabalí; Olga Escalante; Ximena Restrepo	4 × 400 metres relay	DQ		—N/a				Did not advance	

Field events

Athlete	Event	Qualification		Final	
Athlete	Event	Distance	Position	Distance	Position
María Isabel Urrutia	Shot put	15.13	21	Did not advance	
María Isabel Urrutia	Discus throw	53.82	17	Did not advance	

== Boxing ==
Athlete	Event	Round of 64	Round of 32	Round of 16	Quarterfinals	Semifinals	Final	
Athlete	Event	Opposition Result	Opposition Result	Opposition Result	Opposition Result	Opposition Result	Opposition Result	Rank
Simon Morales	Flyweight	Segawa (JPN); L 1–4	Did not advance					
Jorge Eliécer Julio	Bantamweight	Hormillosa (PHI); W RSC R3	Nieves (PUR); W 5–0	Breitbarth (GDR); W 4–1	Matsushima (JPN); W 5–0	Hristov (BUL); L 2–3	Did not advance	3rd place, bronze medalist(s)

== Cycling ==
Seven cyclists, all men, represented Colombia in 1988.

=== Road ===
Men

Athlete	Event	Time	Rank
Juan Carlos Arias	Road race	4:32:56	31
Dubán Ramírez	Road race	4:32:56	67
Nelson Rodríguez	Road race	4:32:56	48
Ángel Noé Alayón; Pedro Bonilla; Orlando Castillo; Julio Cesar Rodríguez	Team time trial	2:10:34.3	21

== Equestrianism ==
=== Dressage ===
Athlete	Horse	Event	Qualification		Final	
Athlete	Horse	Event	Score	Rank	Score	Rank
María Paula Bernal	Armagnac	Individual	978	53	Did not advance	
Héctor Rodríguez	El Sahib	Individual	1229	38	Did not advance	

=== Jumping ===
Athlete	Horse	Event	Qualification						Final					
Athlete	Horse	Event	Round 1		Round 2		Total		Round 1		Round 2		Total	
Athlete	Horse	Event	Score	Rank	Score	Rank	Score	Rank	Penalties	Rank	Penalties	Rank	Total	Rank
Juan Carlos García	Buenos Aires	Individual	12.00	61	38.00	37	50.00	50	Did not advance					
Manuel Torres	Zalme	Individual	32.00	43	35.50	39	67.50	39 Q	35.75	36	Did not advance			

== Fencing ==
Five fencers, all men, represented Colombia in 1988.

Individual
Pool stages

Athlete	Event	Group Stage 1					Group Stage 2					Group Stage 3					
Athlete	Event	Opposition Result	Opposition Result	Opposition Result	Opposition Result	Rank	Opposition Result	Opposition Result	Opposition Result	Opposition Result	Rank	Opposition Result	Opposition Result	Opposition Result	Opposition Result	Opposition Result	Rank
Juan Miguel Paz	Men's épée	Vánky (SWE); L 3–5	Pásztor (HUN); W 5–4	Du (CHN); W 5*–5	Chouinard (CAN); L 4–5	3 Q	Gaille (SUI); L 3–5	Reznichenko (URS); L 2–5	Machado (BRA); L 3–5	Lee (KOR); W 5–2	4 Q	Riboud (FRA); L 1–5	Kardolus (NED); L 2–5	Cuomo (ITA); L 4–5	Kolczonay (HUN); L 4–5	Al-Hamar (KUW); W 5–1	5
Joaquín Pinto	Men's épée	Gerull (FRG); L 4–5	Bergström (SWE); L 3–5	Kolczonay (HUN); W 5–4	Pereira (ESP); L 4–5	4 Q	Srecki (FRA); L 4–5	Pásztor (HUN); L 1–5	Lee (KOR); L 1–5	Davidson (AUS); W 5–4	4 Q	Kühnemund (GDR); L 0–5	Gadomski (POL); L 4–5	Machado (BRA); L 2–5	Ganeff (NED); L 1–5	Llewellyn (GBR); W 5–4	6
Mauricio Rivas	Men's épée	Srecki (FRA); L 4–5	Turiace (ARG); W 5–0	Al-Hamar (KUW); W 5–1	Driessen (NED); W 5–3	2 Q	Trevor (USA); L 0–5	Joos (BEL); L 2–5	Nagele (AUT); W 5–0	Durão (POR); W 5–2	3 Q	Bergström (SWE); L 2–5	Strohmeyer (AUT); L 3–5	Tishko (URS); W 5–3	Trevor (USA); W 5–4	Siess (POL); L 4–5	4 Q

Elimination phase

Athlete	Event	Round 1	Round 2	Round 3	Repechage				Quarterfinals	Semifinals	Final	
Athlete	Event	Round 1	Round 2	Round 3	Round 1	Round 2	Round 3	Round 4	Quarterfinals	Semifinals	Final	
Athlete	Event	Opposition Result	Opposition Result	Opposition Result	Opposition Result	Opposition Result	Opposition Result	Opposition Result	Opposition Result	Opposition Result	Opposition Result	Rank
Mauricio Rivas	Men's épée	Srecki (FRA); W 10–6	Gadomski (POL); W 10–5	Reznichenko (URS); L 5–10	Bye			Schmitt (FRG); L 2–10	Did not advance			

Team

Athlete	Event	Group Stage				Round of 16	Quarterfinals	Semifinals	Final	
Athlete	Event	Opposition Result	Opposition Result	Opposition Result	Rank	Opposition Result	Opposition Result	Opposition Result	Opposition Result	Rank
Oscar Arango; William González; Juan Miguel Paz; Joaquín Pinto; Mauricio Rivas	Men's épée	Switzerland; L 7–8	Hong Kong; W 9–2	—N/a	2 Q	South Korea; L 4–9	Did not advance			

== Judo ==
Athlete	Event	Round of 64	Round of 32	Round of 16	Quarterfinals	Semifinals	Repechage			Final	
Athlete	Event	Round of 64	Round of 32	Round of 16	Quarterfinals	Semifinals	Round 1	Round 2	Round 3	Final	
Athlete	Event	Opposition Result	Opposition Result	Opposition Result	Opposition Result	Opposition Result	Opposition Result	Opposition Result	Opposition Result	Opposition Result	Rank
Eduardo Landazury	65 kg	Bye	Au (HKG); W Yuko	Bujkó (HUN); L Ippon	Did not advance						
Luis Ochoa	78 kg	Bye	González (ESP); L Ippon	Did not advance							
William Medina	86 kg	Bessi (MON); W Ippon	Chibani (ALG); L Waza-ari	Did not advance							

== Shooting ==
Men

Athlete	Event	Qualification		Final	
Athlete	Event	Points	Rank	Points	Rank
Alfredo González	25 m rapid fire pistol	585	26	Did not advance	
Bernardo Tovar	10 m air pistol	573	29	Did not advance	
Bernardo Tovar	25 m rapid fire pistol	593	7 Q	690	6
Bernardo Tovar	50 m pistol	552	29	Did not advance	

Mixed

Athlete	Event	Qualification		Final	
Athlete	Event	Points	Rank	Points	Rank
Jorge Molina	Skeet	142	38	Did not advance	

== Swimming ==
Men

Athlete	Event	Heats		Final A/B	
Athlete	Event	Time	Rank	Time	Rank
Pablo Restrepo	100 m breaststroke	1:04.43	19	Did not advance	
Pablo Restrepo	200 m breaststroke	2:19.58	20	Did not advance	

== Weightlifting ==
Athlete	Event	Snatch		Clean & jerk		Total	Rank
Athlete	Event	Result	Rank	Result	Rank	Total	Rank
Oscar Penagos	56 kg	105.0	12	132.5	16	237.5	17
Tolentino Murillo	60 kg	120.0	7	140.0	9	260.0	8
John Salazar	60 kg	110.0	11	150.0	5	260.0	9

== Wrestling ==
Greco-Roman

Athlete	Event	Group Stage								Final	
Athlete	Event	Opposition Result	Opposition Result	Opposition Result	Opposition Result	Opposition Result	Opposition Result	Opposition Result	Rank	Opposition Result	Rank
Víctor Capacho	48 kg	Al-Faraj (SYR); L fall	Goun (KOR); L 1–2	Did not advance		—N/a			7	Did not advance	

Freestyle

Athlete	Event	Group Stage								Final	
Athlete	Event	Opposition Result	Opposition Result	Opposition Result	Opposition Result	Opposition Result	Opposition Result	Opposition Result	Rank	Opposition Result	Rank
William Delgado	48 kg	Zeinalnia (IRI); L 0–17	Adekunle (NGR); W 8–6	Şükrüoğlu (TUR); L 6–9	Did not advance			—N/a	6	Did not advance	
Oscar Muñoz	52 kg	Elimu (KEN); W fall	Minati (IRQ); W 8–1	Singh (IND); L 6–12	Kim (KOR); L 4–12	Did not advance			5	Did not advance	
Javier Rincon	62 kg	Küng (SUI); L fall	Helmdach (FRG); L 0–4	Did not advance					10	Did not advance	

== See also ==
- Sports in Colombia
- Colombia at the 1987 Pan American Games
