= Portugal at the 1988 Summer Olympics =

- IOC code: POR
- NOC: Olympic Committee of Portugal

in Seoul
- Competitors: 65 (55 men, 10 women) in 14 sports
- Flag bearer: João Rebelo (Shooting)
- Officials: 34
- Medals Ranked 29th: Gold 1 Silver 0 Bronze 0 Total 1

Summer Olympics appearances (overview)
- 1912; 1920; 1924; 1928; 1932; 1936; 1948; 1952; 1956; 1960; 1964; 1968; 1972; 1976; 1980; 1984; 1988; 1992; 1996; 2000; 2004; 2008; 2012; 2016; 2020; 2024; 2028

Portugal competed at the 1988 Summer Olympics in Seoul, South Korea.

A dodadinal delegation of sixty four competitors participated in a new record number of fourteen sports. Portugal's only medal was its second Olympic gold ever, won by the Los Angeles 1984 women's marathon bronze medalist Rosa Mota who added the Olympic title to her European and World marathon titles. The future Olympic champion Fernanda Ribeiro debuted in the Olympics but didn't finish her participation.

The athletics hosted most of the Portuguese competitors' events, confirming this nation's great athletic potential at the Olympic level. Swimming events also registered a bigger amount than the usual. In its second Olympic archery competition, Portugal sent two men as well as its first female Olympic archer who established a new high ranking for a Portuguese archer at 37th.

== Medalist ==
Medal	Name	Sport	Event	Date
Gold	Rosa Mota	Athletics	Women's marathon	23 September

== Competitors ==
The following is the list of number of competitors in the Games.

Sport	Men	Women	Total
Archery	2	1	3
Athletics	23	6	29
Canoeing	3	0	3
Equestrian	1	0	1
Fencing	3	0	3
Gymnastics	1	2	3
Judo	3	–	3
Modern pentathlon	1	–	1
Sailing	3	0	3
Shooting	2	0	2
Swimming	11	1	12
Weightlifting	1	–	1
Wrestling	1	–	1
Total	55	10	65

== Results by event ==
=== Archery ===
Men's Individual Competition:

- Carlos Reis

Open round — 1176 pts (→ 66th, did not advance)

Distance	90m	70m	50m	30m	Total
Round 1	256	284	292	334	1176

- Rui Santos

Open round — 1160 pts (→ 70th, did not advance)

Distance	90m	70m	50m	30m	Total
Round 1	258	281	299	322	1160

Women's Individual Competition:

- Ana Sousa

Open round — 1213 pts (→ 37th, did not advance)

Distance	90m	70m	50m	30m	Total
Round 1	283	303	295	332	1213

=== Athletics ===
==== Men's events ====
100m:

- Luís Cunha

- Round 1 (heat 11) — 10.80 (→ 5th, did not advance)

- Pedro Agostinho

- Round 1 (heat 6) — did not finish

200m:

- Luís Barroso

- Round 1 (heat 9) — 21.31 (→ 2nd)
- Round 2 (heat 3) — 20.81 (→ 4th, did not advance)

- Luís Cunha

- Round 1 (heat 7) — 21.72 (→ 4th, did not advance)

400m:

- Filipe Lomba

- Round 1 (heat 2) — 47.57 (→ 5th, did not advance)

800m:

- Álvaro Silva

- Round 1 (heat 4) — 1:49.09 (→ 3rd)
- Round 2 (heat 4) — 1:46.65 (→ 3rd)
- Semi-final (heat 2) — 1:45.12 (→ 5th, did not advance)

- António Abrantes

- Round 1 (heat 3) — 1:49.01 (→ 4th, did not advance)

1,500m:

- Mário Silva

- Round 1 (heat 2) — 3:42.24 (→ 5th)
- Final — 3:38.77 (→ 9th)

5,000m:

- Domingos Castro

- Round 1 (heat 1) — 13:47.91 (→ 4th)
- Semi-final — 13:22.44 (→ 1st)
- Final — 13:16.09 (→ 4th)

- Fernando Couto

- Round 1 (heat 2) — 13:58.72 (→ 8th, did not advance)

- José Regalo

- Round 1 (heat 3) — 13:43.59 (→ 9th)
- Semi-final — 13:24.48 (→ 3rd)
- Final — did not finish

10,000m:

- António Pinto

- Round 1 (heat 1) — 28:15.63 (→ 6th)
- Final — 28:09.53 (→ 13th)

- Dionísio Castro

- Round 1 (heat 1) — did not finish

- Ezequiel Canario

- Round 1 (heat 2) — 28:43.02 (→ 9th, did not advance)

Marathon

- Joaquim Silva — 2:18:05 (→ 27th)
- Paulo Catarino — DNF

20 km Walk:

- Hélder Oliveira — 1:27:39 (→ 39th)
- José Pinto — 1:26:33 (→ 31st)
- José Urbano — 1:24:56 (→ 29th)

50 km Walk:

- José Pinto — 3:55:57 (→ 21st)

110m Hurdles:

- João Lima

- Round 1 (heat 5) — 14.73 (→ 6th, did not advance)

4 × 100 m Relay:

- Arnaldo Abrantes, Luís Barroso, Pedro Agostinho and Pedro Curvelo

- Round 1 (heat 4) — 39.61 (→ 3rd)
- Semi-final (heat 2) — disqualified

4 × 400 m Relay:

- Álvaro Silva, António Abrantes, Filipe Lomba and Paulo Curvelo

- Round 1 (heat 2) — 3:07.75 (→ 3rd)
- Semi-final (heat 1) — 3:07.75 (→ 7th, did not advance)

Long Jump:

- José Leitão

Qualifying Round (group 1) — 6,99 (→ 15th, did not advance)

Attempt	1	2	3
Result	X	6,99	6,81

Triple Jump:

- José Leitão

Qualifying Round (group 1) — 15,60 (→ 16th, did not advance)

Attempt	1	2	3
Result	15,51	15,60	15,47

==== Women's events ====
3000m:

- Fernanda Ribeiro

- Round 1 (heat 1) — 9:05.92 (→ 13th, did not advance)

10000m:

- Albertina Dias

- Round 1 (heat 2) — 32:13.85 (→ 5th)
- Final — 32:07.13 (→ 10th)

- Albertina Machado

- Round 1 (heat 1) — 31:52.04 (→ 7th)
- Final — 32:02.13 (→ 9th)

Marathon:

- Aurora Cunha — did not start
- Conceição Ferreira — 2:34:23 (→ 20th)
- Rosa Mota — 2:25:40 (→ Gold Medal)

=== Canoeing ===
==== Sprint ====
Men

Athlete	Event	Heats		Repechage		Semifinals		Final	
Athlete	Event	Time	Rank	Time	Rank	Time	Rank	Time	Rank
José Garcia	K-1 500 m	1:57.83	6 QR	DSQ		Did not advance			
José Garcia	K-1 1000 m	3:44.53	4 QR	3:51.14	1 QS	3:44.00	4	Did not advance	
António Brinco; Eduardo Gomes	K-2 500 m	3:31.95	4 QR	3:47.99	5	Did not advance			

=== Equestrian ===
Men's Individual Jumping:

- Manuel Malta da Costa — 33rd

Qualifying	Time	Penalties			Pts	Rank
Qualifying	Time	Obstacle	Time	Total	Pts	Rank
Round 1	107.44	0	0.00	0.00	69.50	1st
Round 2	98.05	20	1.00	21.00	25.00	?
Total		20	1.00	21.00	94.50	26th

Final	Time	Penalties			Rank
Final	Time	Obstacle	Time	Total	Rank
Round 1	106.24	24	0.00	24.00	33rd

=== Fencing ===
Men's épée

- José Bandeira — 67th

- Round 1 (pool 15) — 5 matches, 1 victory (→ 5th, did not advance)

1. Cezary Siess (POL) (→ lost by 5:3)
2. Rafael Di Tella (ARG) (→ lost by 5:5)
3. Arwin Kardolus (NED) (→ lost by 5:3)
4. Arnd Schmitt (FRG) (→ lost by 5:1)
5. Alfredo Bogarin Arzamendia (PAR) (→ won by 5:3)

- Óscar Pinto — 74th

- Round 1 (pool 2) — 4 matches, 0 victories (→ 5th, did not advance)

1. Andre Kuhn (SUI) (→ lost by 5:3)
2. Roberto Lazzarini (BRA) (→ lost by 5:2)
3. Stéphane Ganeff (NED) (→ lost by 5:1)
4. Sandro Cuomo (ITA) (→ lost by 5:0)

- Roberto Durão — 60th

- Round 1 (pool 3) — 4 matches, 1 victory (→ 4th)

1. Jean Michel Henry (FRA) (→ lost by 5:1)
2. Robert Marx (USA) (→ won by 5:5)
3. Il-Hee Lee (KOR) (→ lost by 5:3)
4. Fernando Pena (ESP) (→ lost by 5:2)

- Round 2 (pool 12) — 4 matches, 0 victories (→ 5th, did not advance)

1. Stephen Trevor (USA) (→ lost by 5:2)
2. Mauricio Rivas (COL) (→ lost by 5:2)
3. Johannes Nagele (AUT) (→ lost by 5:2)
4. Stefan Joos (BEL) (→ lost by 5:1)

Men's foil

- José Bandeira — 55th

- Round 1 (pool 12) — 5 matches, 1 victory (→ 5th, did not advance)

1. Andrea Borella (ITA) (→ lost by 5:2)
2. Shaopei Lao (CHN) (→ lost by 5:2)
3. Chung Man Lee (HKG) (→ won by 5:2)
4. Thierry Soumagne (BEL) (→ lost by 5:1)
5. Stephen Angers (CAN) (→ lost by 5:1)

=== Gymnastics ===
==== Artistics ====
Men's Individual All-Round Competition:

- Hélder Pinheiro — 109.600 pts (→ 85th)

Subdivision 1 (Group 4)
Round	Floor	Pomm. Horse	Rings	Vault	Parallel Bars	Horizontal Bar	Total	
Ia	9.300	9.450	8.700	8.800	9.200	9.200	54.650	109.600
Ib	9.200	9.600	9.250	9.150	9.400	8.350	54.950	109.600

Women's Individual All-Round Competition:

- Sónia Moura — 83rd

Subdivision 1 (Group 3)
Round	Vault	Uneven Bars	Balance Beam	Floor	Total	
Ia	9.300	9.375	8.775	9.175	36.625	73.025
Ib	9.575	9.275	8.400	9.150	36.400	73.025

==== Rhythmics ====
Women's Individual All-Round Competition:

- Patricia Jorge — 37.050 pts (→ 30th)

Preliminary Round
Rope	Hoop	Clubs	Ribbon	Total
9.350	9.100	9.200	9.400	37.050

=== Judo ===
Men's Extra Lightweight (–60 kg):

- Renato Santos

Pool B
- 1/32 finals — Bye
- 1/16 finals — Carlos Sotillo (ESP) (→ won by kiken-gachi)
- 1/8 finals — Zhang Guojun (CHN) (→ lost by yusei-gachi, did not advance)

- Hugo Assunção

Pool A
- 1/32 finals — James Sibenge (ZIM) (→ won by ippon)
- 1/16 finals — Eugene McManus (IRL) (→ won by yusei-gachi)
- 1/8 finals — Anders Dahlin (SWE) (→ lost by koka, did not advance)

Men's Half Middleweight (–78 kg):

- Pedro Cristóvão

Pool A
- 1/32 finals — Bye
- 1/16 finals — Neil Adams (GBR) (→ lost by ippon, did not advance)

Women's Half Middleweight (–61 kg):

- Teresa Gaspar

Pool B
- 1/4 finals — Lynn Roethke (USA) (→ lost by yuko)
- Repêchage — Boguslawa Olechnowicz (POL) (→ lost by ippon, did not advance)

=== Modern pentathlon ===
One male pentathlete represented Portugal in 1988.

Men's Individual Competition:

- Manuel Barroso — 4844 pts (→ 34th)

Event	Riding	Fencing	Swimming	Shooting	Cross-country	Total
Pts	910	677	1236	802	1219	4844

Men's Team Competition:

- Manuel Barroso — 4844 pts (→ 22nd)

=== Sailing ===
Star:

- Henrique Anjos and Patricio de Barros — 115 pts (→ 15th)

Race	1	2	3	4	5	6	7	Total	Net
Place	~~16th~~	13th	8th	16th	14th	16th	12th	Total	Net
Pts	~~22~~	19	14	22	20	22	18	137	115

Division II:

- Luís Calico — 132 pts (→ 19th)

Race	1	2	3	4	5	6	7	Total	Net
Place	23rd	~~26th~~	14th	15th	9th	23rd	12th	Total	Net
Pts	29	~~32~~	20	21	15	29	18	164	132

=== Shooting ===
Men's 10m Air Pistol:

- José Pena — did not start

Men's Trap:

- Hélder Cavaco — 139 hits (→ 37th)

Round	1	2	3	4	5	6	7	8	Total
Hits	25	21	24	23	24	22	–	–	139

- João Rebelo — 190 hits (→ 18th)

Round	1	2	3	4	5	6	7	8	Total
Hits	24	24	25	24	22	24	24	23	190

=== Swimming ===
==== Men's Events ====
100m Breaststroke:

- Alexandre Yokochi

- Heats (heat 2) — 1:05.66 (→ 1st, did not advance – 40th overall)

200m Breaststroke:

- Alexandre Yokochi

- Heats (heat 6) — 2:17.87 (→ 5th)
- Final B — 2:18.01 (→ 1st – 9th overall)

100m Butterfly:

- Mabílio Albuquerque

- Heats (heat 2) — 57.30 (→ 2nd, did not advance – 33rd overall)

- Paulo Camacho

- Heats (heat 3) — 57.62 (→ 4th, did not advance, 37th place)

200m Butterfly:

- Diogo Madeira

- Heats (heat 2) — 2:03.79 (→ 1st, did not advance – 26th overall)

- João Santos

- Heats (heat 2) — 2:04.74 (→ 2nd, did not advance – 29th overall)

50m Freestyle:

- Paulo Trindade

- Heats (heat 6) — 24.02 (→ 5th, did not advance – 31st overall)

- Sérgio Esteves

- Heats (heat 5) — 24.24 (→ 2nd, did not advance – 30th overall)

1500m Freestyle:

- Artur Costa

- Heats (heat 2) — 15:56.13 (→ 7th, did not advance – 30th overall)

200m Individual Medley:

- Diogo Madeira

- Heats (heat 4) — 2:10.21 (→ 2nd, did not advance – 28th overall)

400m Individual Medley:

- Rui Borges

- Heats (heat 2) — 4:30.79 (→ 3rd, did not advance – 22nd overall)

- Diogo Madeira

- Heats (heat 2) — 4:35.00 (→ 5th, did not advance – 26th overall)

4 × 100 m Freestyle Relay:

- Mabílio Albuquerque, Henrique Villaret, Sérgio Esteves and Vasco Sousa

- Heats (heat 1) — 3:33.31 (→ 5th, did not advance – 14th overall)

==== Women's Events ====
100m Butterfly:

- Sandra Neves

- Heats (heat 3) — 1:04.60 (→ 3rd, did not advance – 27th overall)

200m Butterfly:

- Sandra Neves

- Heats (heat 2) — 2:18.29 (→ 5th, did not advance – 18th overall)

=== Weightlifting ===
Men's Lightweight (–67,5 kg):

- Paulo Duarte

Group C — 275,0 kg (→ 14th)

Event	Attempt			Result
Event	1	2	3	Result
Snatch	120,0	125,0	~~127,5~~	125,0
Clean & Jerk	150,0	~~155,0~~	~~155,0~~	150,0
Total				275,0

=== Wrestling ===
Men's Greco-Roman Flyweight (–52 kg):

- José Marques

Group B:
- Round 1 — Pete Stjernberg (SWE) (→ lost by injury)
- Round 2 — Jae-Suk Lee (KOR) (→ lost by injury; did not advance)

== Officials ==
- Celorico Moreira (chief of mission)
