= New Zealand at the 1988 Summer Olympics =

- IOC code: NZL
- NOC: New Zealand Olympic and Commonwealth Games Association
- Website: www.olympic.org.nz

in Seoul
- Competitors: 83 (67 men, 16 women) in 16 sports
- Flag bearer: Ian Ferguson
- Officials: 61
- Medals Ranked 18th: Gold 3 Silver 2 Bronze 8 Total 13

Summer Olympics appearances (overview)
- 1908; 1912; 1920; 1924; 1928; 1932; 1936; 1948; 1952; 1956; 1960; 1964; 1968; 1972; 1976; 1980; 1984; 1988; 1992; 1996; 2000; 2004; 2008; 2012; 2016; 2020; 2024

Other related appearances
- Australasia (1908–1912)

New Zealand competed at the 1988 Summer Olympics in Seoul, South Korea. 83 competitors, 67 men and 16 women, took part in 58 events in 16 sports. In addition, New Zealand sent four women to compete in Taekwondo, which was one of the Olympic Games' demonstration sports. Sports administrator Bruce Ullrich was New Zealand's Chef de Mission, after previously having had that role for the 1982 and 1986 Commonwealth Games.

== Medal tables ==
Medal	Name	Sport	Event	Date
Gold	Bruce Kendall	Sailing	Men's Division II	27 September
Gold	Ian Ferguson; Paul MacDonald	Canoeing	Men's K-2 500 m	30 September
Gold	Mark Todd	Equestrian	Individual eventing	2 October
Silver	Rex Sellers; Chris Timms	Sailing	Tornado	27 September
Silver	Ian Ferguson; Paul MacDonald	Canoeing	Men's K-2 1000 m	1 October
Bronze	Paul Kingsman	Swimming	Men's 200 m backstroke	22 September
Bronze	Eric Verdonk	Rowing	Men's single sculls	24 September
Bronze	George Keys; Ian Wright; Greg Johnston; Chris White; Andrew Bird (cox)	Rowing	Men's coxed four	24 September
Bronze	Lynley Hannen; Nikki Payne	Rowing	Women's coxless pair	24 September
Bronze	Anthony Mosse	Swimming	Men's 200 m butterfly	24 September
Bronze	John Cutler	Sailing	Men's Finn	27 September
Bronze	Paul MacDonald	Canoeing	Men's K-1 500 m	30 September
Bronze	Andrew Bennie; Margaret Knighton; Tinks Pottinger; Mark Todd	Equestrian	Team eventing	2 October

Medals by sport
Sport	Gold medal	Silver medal	Bronze medal	Total
Canoeing	1	1	1	3
Sailing	1	1	1	3
Equestrian	1	0	1	2
Rowing	0	0	3	3
Swimming	0	0	2	2
Total	3	2	8	13

Medals by gender
Gender	Gold medal	Silver medal	Bronze medal	Total
Male	2	1	6	9
Female	0	0	1	1
Mixed / open	1	1	1	3
Total	3	2	8	13

== Competitors ==
The following table lists the number of New Zealand competitors participating at the Games according to gender and sport.

Sport	Men	Women	Total
Archery	0	1	1
Athletics	2	4	6
Canoeing	7	0	7
Cycling	12	1	13
Equestrian	6	2	8
Fencing	1	0	1
Gymnastics	0	1	1
Judo	2	–	2
Rowing	10	2	12
Sailing	11	2	13
Shooting	4	0	4
Swimming	5	2	7
Table tennis	2	0	2
Tennis	2	1	3
Weightlifting	1	–	1
Wrestling	2	–	2
Total	67	16	83

== Archery ==
New Zealand's 1988 archery team included only one woman, veteran Ann Shurrock.

Athlete	Event	Ranking round						Round 1						Quarterfinal						Semifinal						Final						Total	Rank
Athlete	Event	30 m	50 m	60 m	70 m	Total	Rank	30 m	50 m	60 m	70 m	Total	Rank	30 m	50 m	60 m	70 m	Total	Rank	30 m	50 m	60 m	70 m	Total	Rank	30 m	50 m	60 m	70 m	Total	Rank	Total	Rank
Ann Shurrock	Women's individual	324	293	302	298	1217	36	Did not advance																									36

== Athletics ==
=== Track and road ===
Athlete	Event	Heat		Quarterfinal		Semifinal		Final	
Athlete	Event	Result	Rank (Note: Ranks given are within the heat)	Result	Rank	Result	Rank	Result	Rank
Anne Audain	Women's 10,000 m	32:10.73	12 q	—N/a				32:10.47	11
John Campbell	Men's marathon	—N/a						2:14:08	12
Christine McMiken	Women's 10,000 m	32:20.39	10	—N/a				did not advance	
Lorraine Moller	Women's marathon	—N/a						2:37:52	33
Christine Pfitzinger	Women's 3000 m	9:01.30	9	—N/a				did not advance	

=== Combined ===
Athlete	Event	100 m	Long jump	Shot put	High jump	400 m	110 m hurdles	Discus throw	Pole vault	Javelin throw	1500 m	Overall points	Rank
Simon Poelman	Men's decathlon	11.09; 841 pts	7.08; 833 pts	14.51; 760 pts	2.03; 831 pts	49.89; 820 pts	14.78; 876 pts	43.20; 730 pts	4.90; 880 pts	57.18; 696 pts	4:28.54; 754 pts	8021	16

== Canoeing ==
Athlete	Event	Heats		Repechages		Semifinals		Final	
Athlete	Event	Time	Rank	Time	Rank	Time	Rank	Time	Rank
Grant Bramwell; Brent Clode; John McDonald; Stephen Richards	Men's K-4 1000 m	3:10.27	5 R	3:11.27	3 Q	3:15.90	4	did not advance	
Ian Ferguson; Paul MacDonald	Men's K-2 500 m	1:32.32	1 Q	—N/a		1:33.81	1 Q	1:33.98	1st place, gold medalist(s)
Ian Ferguson; Paul MacDonald	Men's K-2 1000 m	3:20.44	1 Q	—N/a		3:23.13	1 Q	3:32.71	2nd place, silver medalist(s)
Paul MacDonald	Men's K-1 500 m	1:41.65	2 Q	—N/a		1:43.33	1 Q	1:46.46	3rd place, bronze medalist(s)
Alan Thompson	Men's K-1 1000 m	3:48.10	4 R	3:46.20	1 Q	3:45.40	4 q	3:56.91	6

== Cycling ==
Thirteen cyclists, twelve men and one woman, represented New Zealand in 1988.

=== Road ===
Athlete	Event	Time	Rank
Brian Fowler	Men's individual road race	4:32:56	75
Madonna Harris	Women's individual road race	DNF	
Graeme Miller	Men's individual road race	4:32:46	8
Wayne Morgan	Men's individual road race	DNF	
Brian Fowler; Greg Fraine; Paul Leitch; Gavin Stevens	Men's team time trial	2:03:48.7	12

=== Track ===
Men's 1 km time trial

Athlete	Time	Rank
Tony Graham	1:05.744	7

Men's individual pursuit

Athlete	Qualification		Round 1	Quarterfinals	Semifinals	Final	Rank
Athlete	Time	Rank	Opposition Time	Opposition Time	Opposition Time	Opposition Time	Rank
Gary Anderson	4:41.83	8	Risi (SUI); W 4:41.25	Sturgess (GBR); L 4:42.82	did not advance		7

Men's team pursuit

Athlete	Qualification		Quarterfinals	Semifinals	Final	Rank
Athlete	Time	Rank	Opposition Time	Opposition Time	Opposition Time	Rank
Craig Connell; Nigel Donnelly; Andrew Whitford; Stuart Williams	4:26.13	14	did not advance			14

== Equestrian ==
=== Eventing ===
Rider	Horse	Event	Dressage		Cross-country		Jumping		Overall	
Rider	Horse	Event	Points	Rank	Points	Rank	Points	Rank	Points	Rank
Andrew Bennie	Grayshott	Individual	52.20	8	85.60	21	5.00	23	162.80	20
Margaret Knighton	Enterprise	Individual	74.60	36	90.00	24	DNS		DNF	
Tinks Pottinger	Volunteer	Individual	65.80	23	0.00	=1	0.00	=1	65.80	5
Mark Todd	Charisma	Individual	37.60	1	0.00	=1	5.00	=11	42.60	1st place, gold medalist(s)
Andrew Bennie; Margaret Knighton; Tinks Pottinger; Mark Todd	As above	Team	155.60	3	85.60	2	30.00	6	271.20	3rd place, bronze medalist(s)

=== Jumping ===
==== Individual ====
Athlete	Horse	Qualifying				Final			Rank
Athlete	Horse	Round 1	Round 2	Total points	Rank	Round 1	Round 2	Total faults	Rank
Maurice Beatson	Jeferson Junior	43.50	16.00	59.50	48	did not advance			
John Cottle	Ups & Downs	13.50	DNF			did not advance			
Mark Todd	Bago	55.00	33.00	88.00	30 Q	12.00	did not advance		
Harvey Wilson	Crosby	22.50	19.50	42.00	55	did not advance			

==== Team ====
Athlete	Horse	Round 1		Round 2		Total	Rank
Athlete	Horse	Faults	Rank	Faults	Rank	Total	Rank
Maurice Beatson; Colin McIntosh; Mark Todd; Harvey Wilson	Jeferson Junior; Gigolo; Bago; Crosby	52.25	12	44.75	10	97.00	12

== Fencing ==
One male fencer represented New Zealand in 1988.

Athlete	Event	Round 1 pool	Quarterfinal pool	Semifinal pool	Final pool	Quarterfinal	Semifinal	Final	Rank
Athlete	Event	Opposition Result	Opposition Result	Opposition Result	Opposition Result	Opposition Result	Opposition Result	Opposition Result	Rank
Martin Brill	Men's individual épée	Winter (FIN); L 4 – 5	Pusch (FRG); L 2 – 5	Mazzoni (ITA); W 5 – 3	Pantano (ITA); W 10 – 8	Shuvalov (URS); L 3 – 10	did not advance		7
Martin Brill	Men's individual épée	Tyshko (URS); L 0 – 5	Ma (CHN); W 5 – 2	Dessureault (CAN); W 5 – 3	Shuvalov (URS); L 9 – 10	Shuvalov (URS); L 3 – 10	did not advance		7
Martin Brill	Men's individual épée	Birnbaum (AUT); W 5 – 1	Strohmeyer (AUT); W 5 – 4	Ma (CHN); W 5 – 2	Gerull (FRG); W 10 – 7	Shuvalov (URS); L 3 – 10	did not advance		7
Martin Brill	Men's individual épée	Thomas (ARU); W 5 – 0	Turiace (ARG); W 5 – 4	Gaille (SUI); L 4 – 5	Gaille (SUI); W 10 – 5	Shuvalov (URS); L 3 – 10	did not advance		7
Martin Brill	Men's individual épée	Tang (HKG); W 5 – 2	—N/a	Fonseca (BRA); L 4 – 5	Strohmeyer (AUT); W 10 – 7	Shuvalov (URS); L 3 – 10	did not advance		7

== Gymnastics ==
=== Rhythmic ===
Women's individual all-around

Athlete	Qualifying						Final					Total	Rank
Athlete	Hoop	Rope	Clubs	Ribbon	Total	Rank	Hoop	Ball	Clubs	Ribbon	Total	Total	Rank
Angela Walker	9.200	9.300	9.100	9.350	36.950	=32	did not advance						

== Judo ==
Athlete	Event	Elimination pool			Repechage pool		Final	Rank
Athlete	Event	Opposition Result	Opposition Result	Opposition Result	Opposition Result	Opposition Result	Opposition Result	Rank
Brent Cooper	Men's half-lightweight	Sène (SEN); W	El-Mamoun (MAR); W	Pawłowski (POL); L	Laats (BEL); W	Yamamoto (JPN); L	Did not advance	=5
Bill Vincent	Men's middleweight	Jani (CAN); W	White (GBR); L	Did not advance				=13

== Rowing ==
Men

Athlete	Event	Heats		Repechage		Semifinals		Final	
Athlete	Event	Time	Rank	Time	Rank	Time	Rank	Time	Rank
Eric Verdonk	Single sculls	7:18.69	1 SA/B	Bye		7:11.98	3 FA	6:58.66	3rd place, bronze medalist(s)
Greg Johnston; Chris White; Andrew Bird (cox)	Coxed pair	7:22.32	3 SA/B	DNS					
Campbell Clayton-Greene; Geoff Cotter; Bill Coventry; Neil Gibson	Coxless four	6:06.75	2 SA/B	Bye		6:06.60	4 FB	6:04.74	7
George Keys; Ian Wright; Greg Johnston; Chris White; Andrew Bird (cox)	Coxed four	6:03.35	3 SA/B	Bye		6:10.41	3 FA	6:15.78	3rd place, bronze medalist(s)

Women

Athlete	Event	Heats		Repechage		Final	
Athlete	Event	Time	Rank	Time	Rank	Time	Rank
Nikki Payne; Lynley Hannen	Coxless pair	8:02.39	2 R	7:59.93	1 FA	7:35.68	3rd place, bronze medalist(s)

== Sailing ==
New Zealand had thirteen competitors in Seoul; eleven men and two women.

Athlete	Event	Race							Net points	Final rank
Athlete	Event	1	2	3	4	5	6	7	Net points	Final rank
John Cutler	Men's Finn	15.0	~~16.0~~	8.0	8.0	14.0	0.0	0.0	45.0	3rd place, bronze medalist(s)
Simon Daubney; Tom Dodson (helm); Aran Hansen	Soling	8.0	15.0	13.0	~~22.0~~	5.7	21.0	11.7	74.4	7
Peter Evans (helm); Simon Mander	Men's 470	5.7	14.0	17.0	~~24.0~~	3.0	13.0	10.0	62.7	6
Fiona Galloway (helm); Jan Shearer	Women's 470	~~22.0~~	10.0	17.0	19.0	13.0	13.0	11.7	83.7	9
Murray Jones (helm); Greg Knowles	Flying Dutchman	3.0	0.0	15.0	8.0	18.0	~~20.0~~	16.0	60.0	5
Bruce Kendall	Men's Division II	5.7	5.7	0.0	10.0	14.0	0.0	~~15.0~~	35.4	1st place, gold medalist(s)
Rex Sellers; Chris Timms (helm)	Tornado	~~16.0~~	5.7	0.0	8.0	11.7	0.0	10.0	35.4	2nd place, silver medalist(s)

== Shooting ==
Men's 50 m rifle, prone

Athlete	Qualification rounds								Final rounds							Total	Rank
Athlete	Round 1	Round 2	Round 3	Round 4	Round 5	Round 6	Total	Rank	Round 1	Round 2	Round 3	Round 4	Round 5	Round 6	Total	Total	Rank
Stephen Petterson	100	100	99	97	100	100	596	10	did not advance								10

Men's 50 m pistol

Athlete	Qualification rounds								Final	Total	Rank
Athlete	Round 1	Round 2	Round 3	Round 4	Round 5	Round 6	Total	Rank	Final	Total	Rank
Greg Yelavich	91	91	85	91	88	89	535	41	did not advance		41

Mixed skeet

Athlete	Qualification		Semifinal				Final	Total	Rank
Athlete	Score	Rank	Round 1	Round 2	Total	Rank	Final	Total	Rank
John Farrell	137	51	did not advance						51
John Woolley	143	=33	did not advance						=33

== Swimming ==
Athlete	Event	Heat		Final	
Athlete	Event	Result	Rank	Result	Rank
Ross Anderson	Men's 100 m freestyle	52.33	36	did not advance	
Ross Anderson	Men's 100 m butterfly	56.31	25	did not advance	
Ross Anderson	Men's 200 m butterfly	2:02.40	20	did not advance	
Anthony Beks	Men's 100 m breaststroke	1:05.65	39	did not advance	
Anthony Beks	Men's 200 m breaststroke	2:27.26	42	did not advance	
Sylvia Hume	Women's 100 m backstroke	1:05.81	25	did not advance	
Sylvia Hume	Women's 200 m backstroke	2:21.55	21	did not advance	
Paul Kingsman	Men's 100 m backstroke	57.80	19	did not advance	
Paul Kingsman	Men's 200 m backstroke	2:02.20	7 Q	2:00.48 NR	3rd place, bronze medalist(s)
Richard Lockhart	Men's 100 m breaststroke	1:06.27	46	did not advance	
Richard Lockhart	Men's 200 m breaststroke	2:24.52	36	did not advance	
Anthony Mosse	Men's 100 m butterfly	54.63	10 QB	54.63	10
Anthony Mosse	Men's 200 m butterfly	1:58.71	2 Q	1:58.28	3rd place, bronze medalist(s)
Sharon Musson	Women's 100 m backstroke	1:04.58	14 QB	1:04.17	15
Sharon Musson	Women's 200 m backstroke	2:17.47	13 QB	2:16.06	10
Paul Kingsman; Anthony Beks; Anthony Mosse; Ross Anderson	Men's 4 × 100 m medley relay	3:48.93	11	did not advance	

== Table tennis ==
Athlete	Event	Pool stage										Round of 16	Quarterfinals	Semifinals	Final	Rank
Athlete	Event	Opposition Result	Opposition Result	Opposition Result	Opposition Result	Opposition Result	Opposition Result	Opposition Result	W	L	Rank	Opposition Result	Opposition Result	Opposition Result	Opposition Result	Rank
Barry Griffiths	Men's singles	Xu (CHN); L 0 – 3	Böhm (FRG); L 1 – 3	Birocheau (FRA); W 3 – 2	Chih (TPE); L 0 – 3	Maringgi (INA); L 2 – 3	Hosnani (MRI); W 3 – 1	Waldner (SWE); L 0 – 3	2	5	7	did not advance				
Barry Griffiths; Peter Jackson	Men's doubles	Waldner / Appelgren (SWE); L 0 – 2	Ding / Baer (AUT); W 2 – 0	Kim / Kim (KOR); L 0 – 2	Böhm / Rebel (FRG); L 0 – 2	Douglas / Andrew (GBR); L 0 – 2	Álvarez / Fermin (DOM); L 0 – 2	Chih / Chih (TPE); L 0 – 2	1	6	8	—N/a	did not advance			

== Tennis ==
Athlete	Event	Round of 64	Round of 32	Round of 16	Quarterfinals	Semifinals	Final	Rank
Athlete	Event	Opposition Result	Opposition Result	Opposition Result	Opposition Result	Opposition Result	Opposition Result	Rank
Belinda Cordwell	Women's singles	Gomer (GBR); L 6–4 5–7 2–6	did not advance					=33
Kelly Evernden	Men's singles	Ivanišević (YUG); W 7–6 6–3 6–3	Mansdorf (ISR); L 4–6 6–3 1–6 5–7	did not advance				=17
Bruce Derlin; Kelly Evernden	Men's doubles	—N/a	Frana / Jaite (ARG); W 6–4 4–1 ret.	Cahill / Fitzgerald (AUS); L 7–6 4–6 2–6 6–3 1–6	did not advance			=9

== Weightlifting ==
Athlete	Event	Snatch		Clean & jerk		Total	Rank
Athlete	Event	Result	Rank	Result	Rank	Total	Rank
Kevin Blake	Men's heavyweight I	NVL		—N/a			DNF

== Wrestling ==
Athlete	Event	Round 1	Round 2	Round 3	Round 4	Round 5	Round 6	Final round	Rank
Athlete	Event	Opposition Result	Opposition Result	Opposition Result	Opposition Result	Opposition Result	Opposition Result	Opposition Result	Rank
Brent Hollamby	Men's bantamweight	Meña (PAN); W 12–4	Chen (CHN); L 4–14	Bye	Khaltmaa (MGL); L 4–19	Eliminated			
Steve Reinsfield	Men's featherweight	Polky (GDR); L P1	Sarkisyan (URS); L 0–13	Eliminated					

== Demonstration sports ==
=== Taekwondo ===
Athlete	Event	Quarterfinals	Semifinals	Final	Rank
Athlete	Event	Opposition Result	Opposition Result	Opposition Result	Rank
Kirsten Demanser	Women's finweight	Chin (TPE); L SUP	did not advance		=5
Rosemary Wilson	Women's featherweight	Dolls (ESP); L PTS	did not advance		=5
Bronwyn Wilson	Women's middlerweight	Kim (KOR); L SUP	did not advance		=5
Susan Graham	Women's heavyweight	Franssen (CAN); L PTS	did not advance		=5

== Officials ==
- Chef de Mission – Bruce Ullrich
- Assistant Chef de Mission – Graeme McCabe
- Women's manager – Barbara Levido
- Director of medical services – Dave Gerrard
- Team doctor – Richard Edmond
- Physiotherapists – Mark Oram, Duncan Reid, Ian Sim, Marion Thogersen
- Attache – Michael Park
- Administration assistant – Catherine McLauchlan
- Archery section manager – Pamela Gordon
- Athletics
  - Section manager – Steve Hollings
  - Coaches – Terry Lomax, John Davies
- Canoeing
  - Section manager – Bill Garlick
  - Assistant section manager – Graham Dobson
  - Coach – Mark Sutherland
  - Assistant coach – Ben Hutchings
- Cycling
  - Section manager – Gordon Sharrock
  - Road coach – Ron Cheatley
  - Track coach – Max Reudi
  - Mechanic – Peter Goding
- Equestrian
  - Section manager – Gus Meech
  - Veterinary surgeon – Wallie Niederer
  - Farrier – Michael Fryatt
  - Three-day eventing
    - Chef d'equipe – Dennis Pain
    - Trainer – Bill Noble
    - Grooms – Jackie Baker, Mary Darby, Helen Gilbert, Jenny Lancaster, Karen Tweedie
  - Showjumping
    - Chef d'equipe – Alan Hampton
    - Trainer – Bill Noble
    - Grooms – Merran Hain, two others
- Fencing section manager – Kate Brill
- Gymnastics section manager – Michelle Duncan
- Judo section manager – Ben Griffiths
- Rowing
  - Section manager – George Tuffin
  - Coaches – Alan Cotter, Brian Hawthorne
- Sailing
  - Section manager – Michael Clarke
  - Chief coach – Harold Bennett
  - Coaches – Grant Beck, Jonathon Bilger, Rod Davis
  - Rules – Andrew Knowles
- Shooting section manager – Graeme Smith
- Swimming
  - Section manager – Merle Jonson
  - Coach – Ross Anderson Sr.
  - Assistant coach – Brett Naylor
- Table tennis section manager – Peter Hirst
- Tennis section manager – Jeff Simpson
- Weightlifting section manager – Garry Marshall
- Wrestling section manager – Andrew Roche
