= Switzerland at the 1988 Summer Olympics =

- IOC code: SUI
- NOC: Swiss Olympic Association

in Seoul
- Competitors: 99 (72 men and 27 women) in 17 sports
- Flag bearer: Cornelia Bürki
- Medals Ranked 33rd: Gold 0 Silver 2 Bronze 2 Total 4

Summer Olympics appearances (overview)
- 1896; 1900; ~~1904~~; 1908; 1912; 1920; 1924; 1928; 1932; 1936; 1948; 1952; 1956; 1960; 1964; 1968; 1972; 1976; 1980; 1984; 1988; 1992; 1996; 2000; 2004; 2008; 2012; 2016; 2020; 2024; 2028

Other related appearances
- 1906 Intercalated Games

Switzerland competed at the 1988 Summer Olympics in Seoul, South Korea. 99 competitors, 72 men and 27 women, took part in 83 events in 17 sports.

== Medalists ==
Medal	Name	Sport	Event	Date
Silver	Ueli Bodenmann; Beat Schwerzmann	Rowing	Men's double sculls	24 September
Silver	Otto Hofer; Daniel Ramseier; Samuel Schatzmann; Christine Stückelberger	Equestrian	Team dressage	25 September
Bronze	Werner Günthör	Athletics	Men's shot put	23 September
Bronze	Christine Stückelberger	Equestrian	Individual dressage	27 September

== Competitors ==
The following is the list of number of competitors in the Games.

Sport	Men	Women	Total
Archery	0	2	2
Athletics	10	9	19
Canoeing	1	0	1
Cycling	6	3	9
Diving	0	1	1
Equestrian	7	1	8
Fencing	5	2	7
Gymnastics	2	0	2
Judo	2	–	2
Modern pentathlon	3	–	3
Rowing	7	0	7
Sailing	10	0	10
Shooting	6	3	9
Swimming	7	3	10
Synchronized swimming	–	3	3
Tennis	2	0	2
Wrestling	4	–	4
Total	72	27	99

== Archery ==
In Switzerland's fourth appearance in Olympic archery, two women competed.

Women's Individual Competition:

- Vreny Burger — Preliminary Round (→ 39th place)
- Nadia Gautschi — Preliminary Round (→ 45th place)

== Athletics ==
Men's Shot Put

- Werner Günthör

- Qualifying Heat — 20.70m
- Final — 21.99m (→ Bronze Medal)

Men's Javelin Throw

- Rudolf Steiner

- Qualification — 76.02m (→ did not advance)

Men's Decathlon

- Beat Gähwiler — 8114 points (→ 12th place)

1. 100 metres — 11.18s
2. Long Jump — 7.34m
3. Shot Put — 14.48m
4. High Jump — 1.94m
5. 400 metres — 49.02s
6. 110m Hurdles — 15.11s
7. Discus Throw — 42.46m
8. Pole Vault — 4.70m
9. Javelin Throw — 65.84m
10. 1.500 metres — 4:16.74s

- Christian Gugler — 7502 points (→ 22nd place)

1. 100 metres — 11.49s
2. Long Jump — 7.02m
3. Shot Put — 13.80m
4. High Jump — 2.03m
5. 400 metres — 50.60s
6. 110m Hurdles — 15.22s
7. Discus Throw — 39.08m
8. Pole Vault — 4.70m
9. Javelin Throw — 60.92m
10. 1.500 metres — 4:21.93s

- Severin Moser — 7502 points (→ 27th place)

1. 100 metres — 11.10s
2. Long Jump — 6.98m
3. Shot Put — 12.69m
4. High Jump — 1.85m
5. 400 metres — 48.63s
6. 110m Hurdles — 15.13s
7. Discus Throw — 38.04m
8. Pole Vault — 4.70m
9. Javelin Throw — 49.52m
10. 1.500 metres — 4:21.90s

Women's Marathon

- Genoveva Eichenmann

- Final — 2"44.37 (→ 47th place)

- Rosmarie Müller

- Final — 2"47.31 (→ 48th place)

Women's Javelin Throw

- Denise Thiémard

- Qualification — 61.74m
- Final — 58.54m (→ 9th place)

Women's Heptathlon

- Corinne Schneider

- Final Result — 6157 points (→ 13th place)

== Cycling ==
Nine cyclists, six men and three women, represented Switzerland in 1988.

Men's road race

- Marcel Stäuble
- Daniel Steiger
- Felice Puttini

Men's 1 km time trial

- Rocco Travella

Men's individual pursuit

- Bruno Risi

Men's points race

- Philippe Grivel

Women's road race

- Edith Schönenberger — 2:00:52 (→ 18th place)
- Barbara Ganz — 2:00:52 (→ 40th place)
- Brigitte Gyr-Gschwend — 2:00:52 (→ 41st place)

== Diving ==
Women

Athlete	Event	Preliminary		Final	
Athlete	Event	Points	Rank	Points	Rank
Beatrice Bürki	3 m springboard	400.32	16	Did not advance	

== Fencing ==
Seven fencers, five men and two women, represented Switzerland in 1988.

Men's épée

- Patrice Gaille
- Michel Poffet
- André Kuhn

Men's team épée

- Patrice Gaille, André Kuhn, Zsolt Madarasz, Gérald Pfefferle, Michel Poffet

Women's foil

- Alessandra Mariéthoz
- Andrea Piros

== Modern pentathlon ==
Three male pentathletes represented Switzerland in 1988.

Men's Individual Competition:

- Peter Steinmann — 5181pts (→ 9th place)
- Andy Jung — 4951pts (→ 26th place)
- Peter Burger — 4731pts (→ 43rd place)

Men's Team Competition:

- Steinmann, Jung, and Burger — 14863pts (→ 7th place)

== Swimming ==
Men's 50 m Freestyle

- Dano Halsall

- Heat — 22.61
- Final — 22.83 (→ 4th place)

- Stéfan Voléry

- Heat — 23.04
- Final — 22.84 (→ 5th place)

Men's 100 m Freestyle

- Stéfan Voléry

- Heat — 50.96
- B-Final — 50.74 (→ 11th place)

- Dano Halsall

- Heat — 51.21 (→ did not advance, 23rd place)

Men's 200 m Freestyle

- Alberto Bottini

- Heat — 1:51.45 (→ did not advance, 20th place)

- Stéfan Voléry

- Heat — 1:52.94 (→ did not advance, 25th place)

Men's 400 m Freestyle

- Alberto Bottini

- Heat — 3:57.92 (→ did not advance, 25th place)

Men's 100 m Backstroke

- Patrick Ferland

- Heat — 58.17 (→ did not advance, 24th place)

Men's 200 m Backstroke

- Patrick Ferland

- Heat — 2:07.77 (→ did not advance, 29th place)

Men's 100 m Breaststroke

- Pierre-Yves Eberle

- Heat — 1:04.53 (→ did not advance, 21st place)

- Étienne Dagon

- Heat — 1:04.71 (→ did not advance, 27th place)

Men's 200 m Breaststroke

- Étienne Dagon

- Heat — 2:18.68
- B-Final — 2:18.17 (→ 13th place)

- Pierre-Yves Eberle

- Heat — 2:20.65 (→ did not advance, 25th place)

Men's 100 m Butterfly

- Théophile David

- Heat — 56.77 (→ did not advance, 30th place)

Men's 200 m Butterfly

- Théophile David

- Heat — 2:05.58 (→ did not advance, 33rd place)

Men's 4 × 100 m Medley Relay

- Patrick Ferland, Étienne Dagon, Dano Halsall, and Stéfan Voléry

- Heat — 3:48.09 (→ did not advance, 9th place)

Women's 50 m Freestyle

- Marie-Therese Armentero

- Heat — 26.32
- B-Final — 26.34 (→ 11th place)

Women's 100 m Freestyle

- Marie-Therese Armentero

- Heat — 57.35 (→ did not advance, 18th place)

Women's 100 m Backstroke

- Eva Gysling

- Heat — 1:05.07 (→ did not advance, 20th place)

Women's 200 m Backstroke

- Eva Gysling

- Heat — 2:24.61 (→ did not advance, 27th place)

Women's 100 m Breaststroke

- Patricia Brülhart

- Heat — 1:15.00 (→ did not advance, 30th place)

Women's 200 m Breaststroke

- Patricia Brülhart

- Heat — 2:42.82 (→ did not advance, 36th place)

== Synchronized swimming ==
Three synchronized swimmers represented Switzerland in 1988.

Women's solo

- Karin Singer
- Edith Boss
- Claudia Peczinka

Women's duet

- Karin Singer
- Edith Boss
