= Kardolus =

Kardolus is a surname. Notable people with the surname include:

- Arwin Kardolus (born 1964), Dutch fencer
- Olaf Kardolus (born 1963), Dutch fencer

== See also ==
- Karolus
