= Óscar Pinto =

Óscar Pinto may refer to:

- Óscar Pinto (fencer) (born 1962), Portuguese fencer
- Óscar Pinto (footballer) (born 2002), Peruvian footballer
