= Pfefferle (surname) =

Pfefferle is a surname of South German origin. The word is a diminutive of pfeffer, and identifies a person who sells spices.

== Notable people with the surname Pfefferle ==
- Gérald Pfefferle (born 1960), a Swiss fencer
- Markus Pfefferle, a German paralympic gold medalist in alpine skiing
- William C. Pfefferle (1923–2010), an American scientist and inventor
- W.T. Pfefferle (born 1962), a Canadian poet
