= Bruce Ullrich =

New Zealand sports administrator (born 1938)

Bruce Ullrich OBE
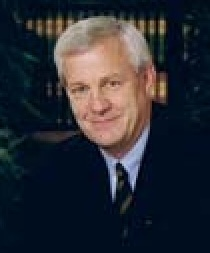
- Ullrich in 2007
- Born: Noel Bruce Ullrich; 23 June 1938 (age 88); New Plymouth, New Zealand
- Education: University of Canterbury; Massey University
- Occupations: Accountant; sports administrator
- Spouse: Jeannette Axelsen (m. 1962; died 2020)
- Children: 3

Noel Bruce Ullrich OBE (born 23 June 1938) is a New Zealand accountant and sports administrator.

== Early life and family ==
Ullrich was born on 23 June 1938 in New Plymouth, to August and Daisy Winifred Ullrich (née McMeekan). He started his education at Westend Primary School in New Plymouth before continuing at Shirley Primary School in Christchurch. He then attended Shirley Intermediate and Christchurch Boys' High School.

In March 1961, Ullrich's engagement to Jeannette Axelsen was announced, and the couple married the following year. They went on to have two sons and one daughter.

In March 1962, Ullrich became an Associate Chartered Accountant (ACA) of the New Zealand Society of Accountants. He graduated with a Bachelor of Commerce from the University of Canterbury in 1965. While a student at Canterbury, he served as treasurer of the University of Canterbury Students' Association in 1961 and president in 1962. A versatile sportsman, he represented the university at rugby union, squash, tennis, and cricket.

== Career ==
=== Accountancy ===
Ullrich was a partner at Morris Pattrick & Co, which is today part of KPMG, from 1962 to 1974. He then set up his own business consultancy. In 1992, Ullrich completed a Master of Business Administration degree at Massey University.

=== Sports administration ===
Ullrich has gained prominence through sports administration. He was vice-chairman of the organising committee for the 1974 British Commonwealth Games held in Christchurch. He was team manager of the New Zealand team at the 1982 and 1986 Commonwealth Games, and the chef de mission for the New Zealand team at the 1988 Summer Olympics. He also served as vice-president of the New Zealand Olympic and Commonwealth Games Association.

Ullrich has tried for many years to bring the Winter Olympic Games to New Zealand, and chaired the promotion committee for a bid in 2002.

=== Other activities ===
From 1970 to 1990, Ullrich was a member of the council of the University of Canterbury, and between 1971 and 1981 he was the council's representative on the Christchurch Boys' High School board of governors. In 2007, he was elected by the Court of Convocation to the council of Massey University, and served in that role for nine years.

Ullrich holds a fascination for China and has travelled there nearly 40 times. He is patron of the Rewi Alley Foundation, with the foundation focussing on the friendship between New Zealand and China. Ullrich gave a speech at the 2025 conference of the New Zealand China Friendship Society.

== Honours and awards ==
In the 1987 New Year Honours, Ullrich was appointed Officer of the Order of the British Empire (OBE), for services to sport. Christchurch Boys' High School, where he had been a student, bestowed its Altiora Peto (transl. I seek higher things) Medal on him in 2025.

== Later life ==
Ullrich's wife, Jeannette, died in 2020. In November 2023, he published his autobiography that he called My Arena.
