= Frédéric Delpla =

French fencer (born 1964)

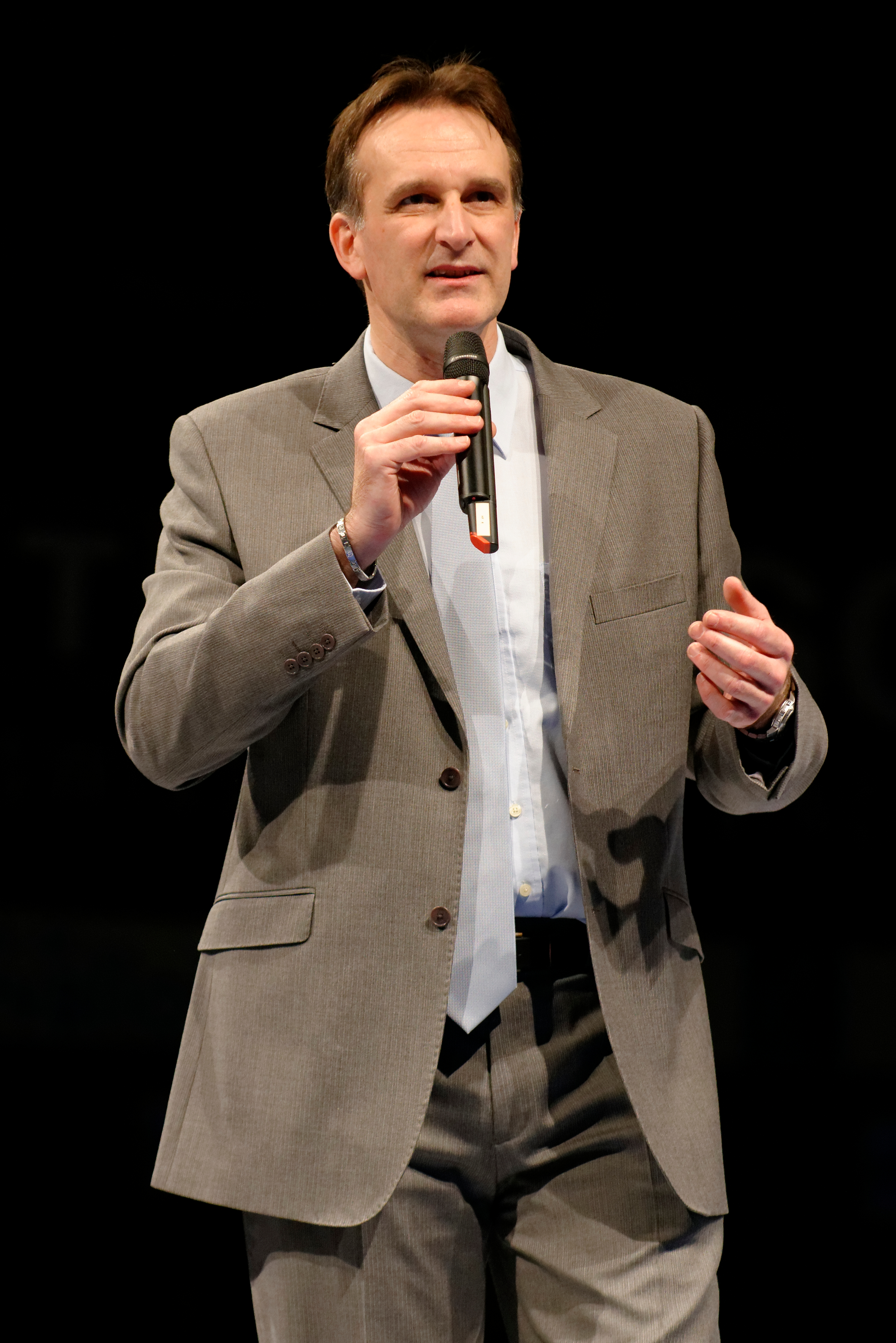
- Frederic Delpla (2013)

Personal information
- Born: 9 November 1964 (age 61) Creil, France

Sport
- Sport: Fencing
Medal record
Men's fencing
Representing France
Olympic Games
Gold medal – first place	1988 Seoul	Épée, team

Frédéric Delpla (born 9 November 1964) is a French fencer. He won a gold medal in the team épée event at the 1988 Summer Olympics.
