= Ali Abuzamia =

Jordanian fencer

Personal information
- Nationality: Jordanian
- Born: 25 December 1968 (age 57)

Sport
- Sport: Fencing

Ali Abuzamia (born 25 December 1968) is a Jordanian former fencer. He competed in the individual épée event at the 1988 Summer Olympics, losing all four of his bouts.
