= Anthony Beks =

New Zealand swimmer

Personal information
- Born: July 12, 1967 (age 59) Christchurch, New Zealand

Sport
- Sport: Swimming
- Strokes: Breaststroke

Anthony Johannes Joseph Maria Beks (born 12 July 1967) is a former breaststroke swimmer from New Zealand, who competed for his native country at the 1988 Summer Olympics in Seoul, South Korea. There he was eliminated in the qualifying heats of the 100m and 200m Breaststroke. He was born in Christchurch.
