= Diogo Madeira =

Portuguese swimmer (born 1970)

Personal information
- Born: 6 September 1970 (age 55) Lisbon, Portugal

Sport
- Sport: Swimming

Diogo Madeira (born 6 September 1970) is a Portuguese former butterfly and medley swimmer. He competed at the 1988, 1992 and 1996 Summer Olympics.
