= Stéfan Voléry =

Swiss swimmer (born 1961)

Personal information
- Born: September 17, 1961 (age 64)

Sport
- Sport: Swimming
Medal record
Representing Switzerland
European Championships (LC)
Bronze medal – third place	1985 Sofia	100 m freestyle
Bronze medal – third place	1987 Strasbourg	50 m freestyle

Stéfan Voléry (born 17 September 1961) is a former freestyle swimmer from Switzerland.

Stéfan competed in the 50 metre freestyle at the 1988 Summer Olympics in Seoul, Korea, finishing fifth in the Championship Final in a time of 22.84 seconds.

He competed in the 100 metre freestyle also, finishing third in the B Final in a time of 50.74 seconds.

He finished 3rd at European Championship in 1985 and 1987.
