= Paul Besselink =

Dutch fencer (born 1967)

Personal information
- Born: 17 November 1967 (age 58) Arnhem, Netherlands

Sport
- Sport: Fencing

Paul Besselink (born 17 November 1967) is a Dutch fencer. He competed in the team épée event at the 1988 Summer Olympics.

Father of Senna Yoelle Loisa Besselink (born 29 Oktober 2005).

Now entrepreneur for Tangla lightning&Living and Besselink Licht.
