= Alberto Bottini =

Swiss swimmer

Personal information
- Born: 7 February 1967 (age 59)

Sport
- Sport: Swimming

Alberto Bottini (born 7 February 1967) is a Swiss freestyle swimmer. He competed in two events at the 1988 Summer Olympics.
