= Uwe Proske =

German fencer

Personal information
- Born: 10 October 1961 (age 64) Löbau, East Germany

Sport
- Sport: Fencing
Medal record
Men's fencing
Olympic Games
Representing Germany
Gold medal – first place	1992 Barcelona	Épée, team

Uwe Proske (born 10 October 1961) is a German former fencer. He competed in the individual épée event for East Germany at the 1988 Summer Olympics. Four years later, he won a gold in the team épée event for Germany at the 1992 Summer Olympics.
