= Andrey Shuvalov =

Soviet fencer (born 1965)

Personal information
- Born: 8 January 1965 (age 61) Idritsa, Russian SFSR, Soviet Union

Sport
- Sport: Fencing
Medal record
Men's fencing
Representing Soviet Union
Olympic Games
Bronze medal – third place	1988 Seoul	Épée, individual
Bronze medal – third place	1988 Seoul	Épée, team
Representing Unified Team
Bronze medal – third place	1992 Barcelona	Épée, team

Andrey Shuvalov (born 8 January 1965) is a Soviet fencer. He won three bronze medals in the épée events at the 1988 and 1992 Summer Olympics.
