= Hugh Kernohan =

British fencer

Personal information
- Born: 2 July 1958 (age 68) Glasgow, Scotland
- Education: Balliol College, Oxford, University of Edinburgh

Sport
- Sport: Fencing
- Event: Épée

Hugh Kernohan (born 2 July 1958) is a British fencer. He competed in the individual épée event at the 1988 Summer Olympics. In 1989, he won the épée title at the British Fencing Championships.

His father is the Scottish writer and broadcaster Robert Deans Kernohan.
