= Andrea Bermond Des Ambrois =

Italian fencer (born 1964)

Personal information
- Born: 4 October 1964 (age 61) Ivrea, Italy

Sport
- Sport: Fencing
Medal record
Representing Italy
Summer Universiade
Gold medal – first place	1987 Zagreb	Individual épée
Gold medal – first place	1987 Zagreb	Team épée
Bronze medal – third place	1985 Kobe	Team épée

Andrea Bermond Des Ambrois (born 4 October 1964) is an Italian fencer. He competed in the team épée event at the 1988 Summer Olympics.
