= Mabílio Albuquerque =

Portuguese swimmer

Personal information
- Born: 3 June 1969 (age 57)

Sport
- Sport: Swimming

Mabílio Albuquerque (born 3 June 1969) is a Portuguese butterfly and freestyle swimmer. He competed in two events at the 1988 Summer Olympics.
