= Karolus =

Karolus is a masculine given name. Notable people with the name include:

- Hans Karolus Ommedal (1901–1984), Norwegian politician
- Karolus Magnus (742–814), King of the Franks

== See also ==
- Carolus (disambiguation)
