= Sérgio Esteves =

Portuguese swimmer (born 1968)

Personal information
- Born: 13 June 1968 (age 56)

Sport
- Sport: Swimming

Sérgio Esteves (born 13 June 1968) is a Portuguese freestyle swimmer who competed in two events at the 1988 Summer Olympics.
