= Jorge Molina (sport shooter) =

Colombian sports shooter

Personal information
- Nationality: Colombian
- Born: 3 April 1956 (age 68)

Sport
- Sport: Sports shooting

Jorge Molina (born 3 April 1956) is a Colombian sports shooter. He competed at the 1984 Summer Olympics and the 1988 Summer Olympics.
