= Pierre-Yves Eberle =

Swiss swimmer and Air Force officer (born 1968)

- Born: 25 February 1968 (age 58); Switzerland
- Military career
- Allegiance: Switzerland
- Branch: Swiss Air Force
- Rank: Lieutenant colonel (German: Oberstleutnant)
- Commands: Chief Operations Center Air Force

Pierre-Yves Eberle (born 25 February 1968), citizen in Geneva, is a Swiss swimmer and lieutenant colonel in the Swiss Air Force

== Tasks within the Swiss Army ==
Lieutenant-Colonel in the General Staff, Pierre-Yves Eberle is the chief of the Operations Center Air Force of the Swiss Army. Subject to him are the areas: ARABELLA / HQ Support / Security, deployment leadership Luftwaffe, deployment planning Air Force, deployment support Air Force, use control aircraft NSF and air transport service of the Federation.

Pierre-Yves Eberle is a professional military pilot and was a member of PC-7 Team in Berufsfliegerkorps and in 1999. He was Fleet Chief F / A-18, Project Manager of the Volltruppenübung Stabante from 3 to 7 October 2011. He flies the Pilatus PC-7, Northrop F-5E, Northrop F-5F and the Fliegerstaffel 18 the F/A-18C and F/A-18D.

== 1988 Summer Olympics ==
He competed in two events at the two events of the 1988 Summer Olympics.
