= Sandra Neves =

Portuguese swimmer

Personal information
- Born: 10 June 1969 (age 57)

Sport
- Sport: Swimming

Sandra Neves (born 10 June 1969) is a Portuguese swimmer. She competed in the women's 100 metre butterfly and the women's 200 metre butterfly events at the 1988 Summer Olympics.
