= Ann Shurrock =

New Zealand archer (born 1946)

Personal information
- Born: 22 May 1946 (age 80) Ashburton, New Zealand
- Height: 170 cm (5 ft 7 in)
- Weight: 60 kg (132 lb)

Sport
- Country: New Zealand
- Sport: Archery

Margaret Ann Shurrock (born 22 May 1946) is a former New Zealand female archer. She competed in the 1984 and 1988 Summer Olympics in the individual competitions for women. She was ranked 24th in the women's individual archery at the 1984 Olympics, and in the 1988 Olympics she was ranked 36th in the final standings. Shurrock also represented New Zealand at the 1982 Commonwealth Games in Brisbane, where she finished fourth in the women's individual archery competition.

Shurrock was considered one of the top New Zealand female archers in early 1980s along with paraplegic archer, Neroli Fairhall, who was the first disabled female athlete to take part in the Olympic Games.
