= Jean-Michel Henry =

French fencer (born 1963)

Personal information
- Born: 14 December 1963 (age 62) Marseille, France

Sport
- Sport: Fencing
Medal record
Men's fencing
Representing France
Olympic Games
Gold medal – first place	1988 Seoul	Épée, team
Silver medal – second place	1984 Los Angeles	Épée, team
Bronze medal – third place	1992 Barcelona	Épée, individual
Bronze medal – third place	1996 Atlanta	Épée, team

Jean-Michel Henry (born 14 December 1963) is a French fencer. He won a gold, a silver and two bronze medals in the épée events at four different Olympic Games.
