= Ludomir Chronowski =

Polish fencer (born 1959)

Personal information
- Born: 31 October 1959 (age 66) Kraków, Poland

Sport
- Sport: Fencing
Medal record
Men's fencing
Representing Poland
Olympic Games
Silver medal – second place	1980 Moscow	Épée, team

Ludomir Krzysztof Chronowski (born 31 October 1959) is a Polish fencer. He won a silver medal in the team épée event at the 1980 Summer Olympics.
