= John Llewellyn (fencer) =

British fencer (born 1957)

Personal information
- Born: 7 August 1957 (age 68) Winnipeg, Manitoba, Canada

Sport
- Sport: Fencing
- Club: Reading FC

John Patrick Llewellyn (born 7 August 1957) is a British fencer. He competed in the 1980, 1984 and 1988 Summer Olympics. He was British fencing champion five times when he won the épée title at the British Fencing Championships in 1981, 1988, 1991, 1992 and 1994.
