= Zsolt Madarasz =

Swiss fencer

Personal information
- Born: 1 December 1959 (age 66)

Sport
- Sport: Fencing

Zsolt Madarasz (born 1 December 1959) is a Swiss fencer. He competed in the team épée event at the 1988 Summer Olympics.
