= Axel Birnbaum =

Austrian fencer

Personal information
- Born: 15 March 1966 (age 60) Vienna, Austria

Sport
- Sport: Fencing

Axel Birnbaum (born 15 March 1966) is an Austrian fencer. He competed in the individual épée event at the 1988 Summer Olympics. His father, Udo Birnbaum, also competed at the Olympics for Austria.
