= Olaf Kardolus =

Dutch fencer (born 1963)

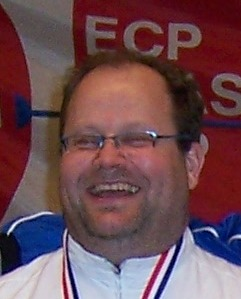
- Olaf Kardolus in 2007

Personal information
- Born: 27 March 1963 (age 63) The Hague, Netherlands

Sport
- Sport: Fencing

Olaf Kardolus (born 27 March 1963) is a Dutch fencer. He competed in the team épée event at the 1988 Summer Olympics.
