= Robert Davidson (fencer) =

Australian fencer

Personal information
- Born: 12 July 1958 (age 67)

Sport
- Sport: Fencing

Robert Davidson (born 12 July 1958) is an Australian fencer. He competed at the 1988 and 1992 Summer Olympics.
