= Martin Brill =

New Zealand fencer

Personal information
- Full name: Martin Leonard Brill
- Nationality: New Zealand
- Born: 7 April 1956 (age 70) Stoke-on-Trent, England
- Height: 1.82 m (6 ft 0 in)

Sport
- Country: New Zealand
- Sport: Fencing

Achievements and titles
- Olympic finals: 15th at 1984, 7th at 1988 Summer Olympics

Martin Leonard Brill (born 7 April 1956) is a New Zealand former fencer, trained in France as a Maître d'armes. He competed in the individual épée events at the 1984 and 1988 Summer Olympics. He came 15th in the 1984 and 7th at the 1988 Summer Olympics. He now lives in Christchurch, New Zealand, where he is president of the Regional Fencing Committee Mid-South.
