= Wladimir Resnitschenko =

Soviet fencer

Personal information
- Born: 27 July 1965 (age 60) Almaty, Kazakh SSR, Soviet Union

Sport
- Sport: Fencing
- Club: FC Tauberbischofsheim
Medal record
Men's fencing
Representing Soviet Union
Olympic Games
Bronze medal – third place	1988 Seoul	Épée, team
Representing Germany
Gold medal – first place	1992 Barcelona	Épée, team

Wladimir Resnitschenko (born 27 July 1965) is a Soviet fencer. He won a bronze medal in the team épée event at the 1988 Summer Olympics representing the Soviet Union. At the 1992 Summer Olympics, he won a gold in the same event representing Germany.
