= Torsten Kühnemund =

German fencer

Personal information
- Born: 28 July 1964 (age 61) Wittenberg, East Germany

Sport
- Sport: Fencing

Torsten Kühnemund (born 28 July 1964) is a German former fencer. He competed in the individual épée event for East Germany at the 1988 Summer Olympics, finishing fifth.
