= Tong King King =

Hong Kong fencer

Personal information
- Born: 15 March 1965 (age 61)

Sport
- Sport: Fencing

Tong King King (born 15 March 1965) is a Hong Kong fencer. He competed in the foil and épée events at the 1988 Summer Olympics.
