= Rafael di Tella =

Argentine fencer

Personal information
- Born: 4 January 1965 (age 61)

Sport
- Sport: Fencing

Rafael di Tella (born 4 January 1965) is an Argentine fencer, economist and academic. He competed at the 1988 and 1992 Summer Olympics. In 1991, di Tella graduated from the Universidad de Buenos Aires with a degree in economics and in 1996 received his doctorate from Keble College, Oxford. He joined the faculty of Harvard Business School in 1997 and subsequently became the Joseph C. Wilson Professor of Business Administration.
