= José Bandeira =

Portuguese fencer (born 1961)

Personal information
- Born: 31 October 1961 (age 64) Oeiras, Portugal

Sport
- Sport: Fencing

José Bandeira (born 13 October 1961) is a Portuguese épée and foil fencer. He competed at the 1988 and 1992 Summer Olympics.
