= Ángel Fernández (fencer) =

Spanish fencer (born 1961)

Personal information
- Born: 22 July 1961 (age 64) Huerta de Valdecarábanos, Spain

Sport
- Sport: Fencing
Medal record
Mediterranean Games
Bronze medal – third place	1983 Casablanca	Individual épée

Ángel Fernández (born 22 July 1961) is a Spanish fencer. He competed in the épée events at the 1984, 1988 and 1992 Summer Olympics. He won a bronze medal in the individual épée event at the 1983 Mediterranean Games.
