= Chan Kai Sang =

Hong Kong fencer

Personal information
- Born: 23 December 1958 (age 67)

Sport
- Sport: Fencing

Chan Kai Sang (Chinese: 陳啟生; Jyutping: can^{4} kai^{2} sang^{1}; born 23 December 1958) is a Hong Kong former fencer. He competed in the individual and team épée events at the 1988 Summer Olympics.
