= Lars Winter =

Finnish fencer

Personal information
- Born: 13 May 1962 (age 64) Lappeenranta, Finland

Sport
- Sport: Fencing

Lars Winter (born 13 May 1962) is a Finnish fencer. He competed in the individual épée event at the 1988 Summer Olympics.
