= Otto Drakenberg =

Swedish business professional

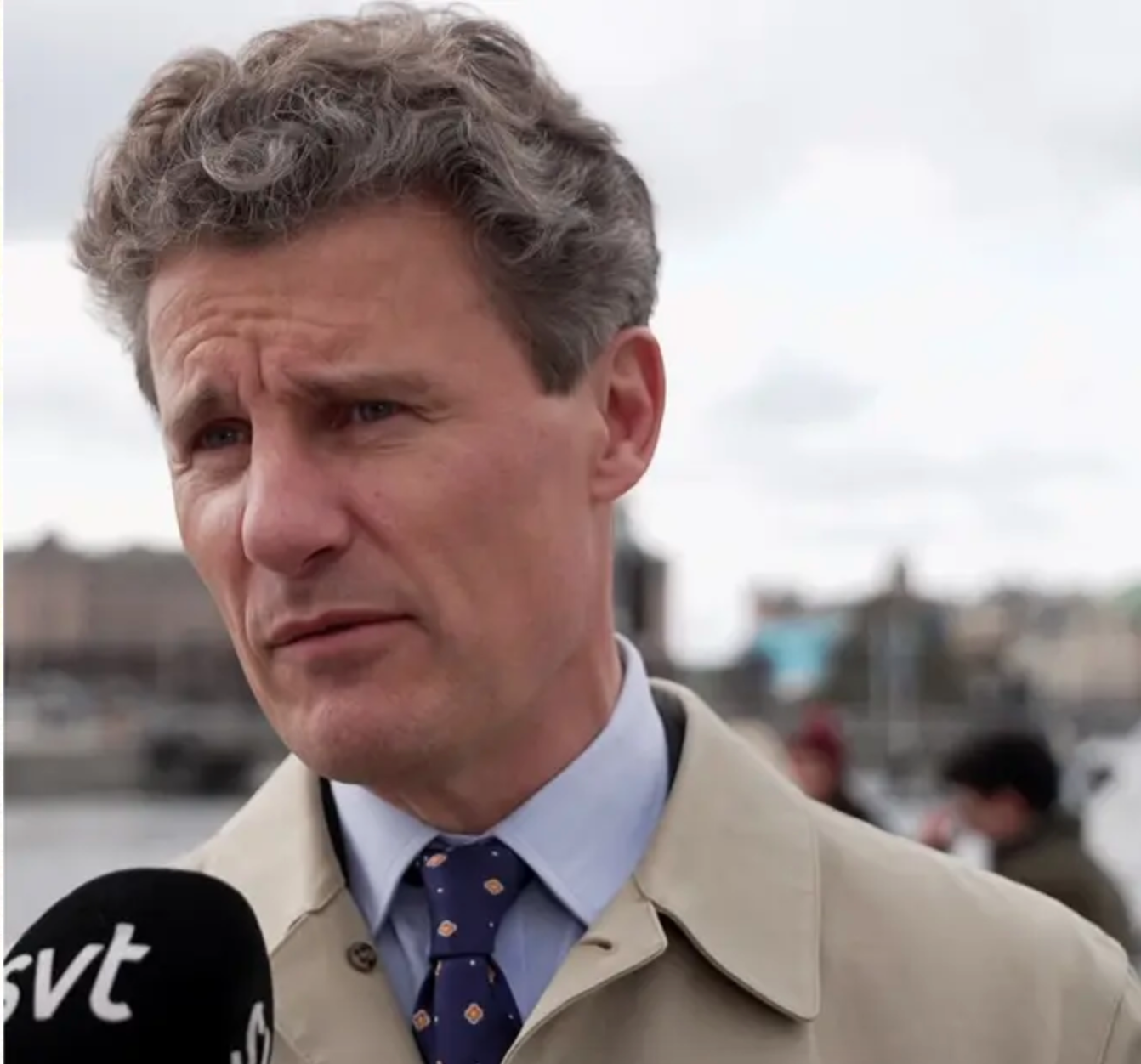
- Drakenberg in 2023
- Born: Jan Sten Otto Drakenberg; 28 July 1966 (age 59)
- Occupation: Businessman

Medal record

Men's fencing

Representing Sweden

European Championships
Silver medal – second place	1994	Èpée team

Nordic Championships
Silver medal – second place	1988	Èpée team
Gold medal – first place	1989	Èpée team
Gold medal – first place	1990	Èpée team
Gold medal – first place	1990	Èpée individual

Swedish Championships
Bronze medal – third place	1987	Èpée individual
Gold medal – first place	1987	Èpée team
Gold medal – first place	1988	Èpée team
Gold medal – first place	1989	Èpée team
Gold medal – first place	1992	Èpée team
Gold medal – first place	1993	Èpée team

Jan Sten Otto Drakenberg (born 28 July 1966) is a Swedish business executive, and a former athlete in fencing and international ocean racing. He competed in the individual and team épée events at the 1988 Summer Olympics. Drakenberg is chairman of Spendrups Brewery, CarpoNovum, Svegro, and the Swedish Fencing Federation; and CEO for SMD Logistics. He was CEO of companies such as Scandi Standard.

== Biography ==
Otto Drakenberg studied at Stockholm University. He earned a bachelor's degree in business administration in 1992, pursued advanced studies in economics from 1993 to 1994 and went on to complete an internship with the United Nations in Geneva.

=== Fencing ===
Otto Drakenberg started fencing in 1971, at 5 years old. He was a member of the Swedish national fencing team in 1988–1989, placing fourth in épée in the 1989 world championships and eighth in the épée team competition in the 1988 summer Olympics in Seoul. Drakenberg won second place in the 1994 European championships in team épée, took five Swedish Championship gold medals in épée between 1987 and 1993, and was Nordic champion for 1989–1990. In 1988 he was named épée fencer-of-the-year and in 1994 he was awarded for the best international performance in connection with the second place in the European Championships. In 1996 Otto Drakenberg received the Swedish Fencing Federation's "elite" commendation for his international performances.

In 2017 Otto Drakenberg was elected President of the Swedish Fencing Federation. During the International Fencing Federation’s Congress in November 2022, Drakenberg insisted on debating human rights concerns in Saudi Arabia before the vote on awarding that country the right to host the 2024 Junior World Championships. His speech before the Congress was met with hostility and protest, to which he responded, "I will never refrain from speaking my word in a democratic world." The attempt to silence Drakenberg was reported to the International Olympic Committee and the conflict received attention in media. Otto Drakenberg ran for International Fencing Federation (FIE) Presidency in November 2024. Drakenberg was the sole candidate against EU-sanctioned Alisjer Usmanov, who is considered in control of the FIE. The FIE presidency campaign received attention in Nordic, British and German media. In March 2026, Drakenberg criticized the FIE for attempting to have sanctions against Usmanov upheld. In may 2026, Drakenberg contributed to an open letter sent to the International Olympic Committee questioning Usmanov's influence in the International Fencing Federation.

In his work as a chairman of the Swedish Fencing Federation in 2026, Drakenberg has stated his support for maintaining the current selection rules for athletes to the Olympic Games.

=== Offshore Sail Racing ===
Otto Drakenberg has competed in offshore sail racing since the 1990s, and in 1995 placed second in the Fastnet Race, Europe's oldest and most prestigious offshore race. In the 2015 Fastnet, he placed third in his class. In 1992 he participated in the Round Britain & Ireland Race and placed second in the French boat Bon Vouloir. Drakenberg came in fifth in the 1999 World Sailing Championships with the boat Investor.

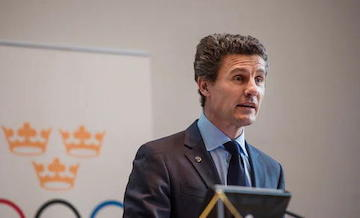
Otto Drakenberg during Swedish Olympic Committee Annual Meeting 2018

=== Business career ===
Drakenberg worked for Procter & Gamble 1996–2000, the final years as Nordic brand manager. After working as export head of the Danish company House of Prince during 2001–2003, Drakenberg was CEO of the Goodyear Dunlop’s Nordic and Baltic business during 2004–2007. During 2007–2010 he led the brewery Carlsberg Sweden and delivered the best results in the company's history. During 2011–2015 he was Group CEO for the Nordic wine and spirit company Arcus-Gruppen A/S, resulting in a successful IPO in 2016. He worked with a number of company transformation efforts 2016 – 2023, including Scandi Standard, Moment Group, Twilfit, and Svegro. He was chairman of the board and CEO for the reconstruction and successful sale of retailer Twilfit in 2019-2020. 2020–2021 he was CEO for stockmarket-listed Moment Group where he took the company through essential refinancing in order to survive the Corona pandemic and return to profitable growth. 2021–2022 Drakenberg was Group CEO for stockmarket-listed Scandi Standard, stabilizing and restructuring the company after a period of turbulence and returning it to profitable growth. 2022-2024 Drakenberg was CEO of micro-optic company Rolling Optics. He is CEO of SMD Logistics.

== Awards and prizes ==
- Épée Fencer of the Year 1988
- Best International Performance of the Year (fencing) 1994
- Swedish Fencing Federation Elite Commendation 1996
- Sweden Knight of the Order of Saint John in Sweden (Knight 2008, Knight of Justice 2021, Commander 2021–)
- Swedish National Sports Television Prize 2024
- Golden merit medal of the Swedish Fencing Federation in 2025.
