= Du Zhencheng =

Chinese fencer (born 1966)

Personal information
- Born: 28 January 1966 (age 60)

Sport
- Sport: Fencing

Du Zhencheng (born 28 January 1966) is a Chinese fencer. He competed in the individual épée event at the 1988 Summer Olympics.
