= Zoltán Székely (fencer) =

Hungarian fencer

Personal information
- Born: 23 February 1952 (age 74) Budapest, Hungary

Sport
- Sport: Fencing

Zoltán Székely (born 23 February 1952) is a Hungarian fencer. He competed in the individual and team épée events at the 1988 Summer Olympics.
