= Arnd Schmitt =

German fencer

Personal information
- Born: 13 July 1965 (age 61) Heidenheim an der Brenz, West Germany

Sport
- Sport: Fencing
- Club: TSV Bayer 04 Leverkusen
Medal record
Representing West Germany
Olympic Games
Gold medal – first place	1988 Seoul	Individual épée
Silver medal – second place	1988 Seoul	Team épée
World Championships
Gold medal – first place	1985 Barcelona	Team épée
Gold medal – first place	1986 Sofia	Team épée
Silver medal – second place	1987 Lausanne	Team épée
Bronze medal – third place	1990 Lyon	Individual épée
Representing Germany
Olympic Games
Gold medal – first place	1992 Barcelona	Team épée
World Championships
Gold medal – first place	1995 The Hague	Team épée
Gold medal – first place	1999 Seoul	Individual épée
Silver medal – second place	1993 Essen	Individual épée
Silver medal – second place	1994 Athens	Team épée
Silver medal – second place	1997 Cape Town	Team épée
Silver medal – second place	1999 Seoul	Team épée
Bronze medal – third place	1991 Budapest	Team épée
Bronze medal – third place	1993 Essen	Team épée
Bronze medal – third place	1994 Athens	Individual épée
Summer Universiade
Gold medal – first place	1991 Sheffield	Team épée
Bronze medal – third place	1993 Buffalo	Individual épée

Arnd Rüdiger Schmitt (born 13 July 1965) is a German fencer and Olympic champion in the épée competition.

He won a gold medal in the individual épée and a team silver medal at the 1988 Summer Olympics in Seoul. He received an Olympic gold medal in épée team in 1992. Schmitt was inducted into Germany's Sports Hall of Fame in 2016.
