= Austin Thomas =

Aruban fencer (1939–2018)

Personal information
- Born: 25 March 1939
- Died: 15 May 2018 (aged 79)

Sport
- Sport: Fencing

Austin Edison Thomas (25 March 1939 – 15 May 2018) was an Aruban fencer. He competed in the individual foil and épée events at the 1988 Summer Olympics.
