= Gérald Pfefferle =

Swiss fencer

Personal information
- Born: 23 May 1960 (age 66)

Sport
- Sport: Fencing

Gérald Pfefferle (born 23 May 1960) is a Swiss fencer. He competed in the team épée event at the 1988 Summer Olympics.
