= Stefano Pantano =

Italian fencer (born 1962)

Personal information
- Born: 4 May 1962 (age 64) Rome, Italy

Sport
- Sport: Fencing
Medal record
Representing Italy
World Championships
Gold medal – first place	1989 Denver	Team épée
Gold medal – first place	1990 Lyon	Team épée
Gold medal – first place	1993 Essen	Team épée
Summer Universiade
Gold medal – first place	1983 Edmonton	Team épée
Gold medal – first place	1987 Zagreb	Team épée
Gold medal – first place	1989 Duisburg	Team épée
Silver medal – second place	1987 Zagreb	Individual épée

Stefano Pantano (born 4 May 1962) is an Italian fencer. He competed in the épée events at the 1988 and 1992 Summer Olympics.
