= Sergio Turiace =

Argentine fencer

Personal information
- Born: 17 February 1963 (age 63)

Sport
- Sport: Fencing

Sergio Turiace (born 17 February 1963) is an Argentine fencer. He competed at the 1984 and 1988 Summer Olympics.
