= Thomas Gerull =

German fencer (born 1962)

Personal information
- Born: 2 January 1962 (age 64) Itzehoe, West Germany

Sport
- Sport: Fencing
Medal record
Men's fencing
Representing West Germany
Olympic Games
Silver medal – second place	1988 Seoul	Épée, team

Thomas Gerull (born 2 January 1962) is a German fencer. He won a silver medal in the team épée event at the 1988 Summer Olympics, representing West Germany.

Gerull was awarded the Silbernes Lorbeerblatt, the highest sporting award in Germany. He later worked as a financial adviser with his twin brother Michael. He and his brother were involved in an investor scandal from 2015 to 2016, defrauding around 25,000 small investors. Thomas and Michael were sentenced to eight and seven years in prison, respectively.
