= Arno Strohmeyer =

Austrian fencer (born 1963)

Personal information
- Born: 26 July 1963 (age 62)

Sport
- Sport: Fencing

Arno Strohmeyer (born 26 July 1963) is an Austrian fencer. He competed in the individual épée events at the 1984 and 1988 Summer Olympics.
