= Tang Wing Keung =

Hong Kong fencer

Personal information
- Born: 10 January 1956 (age 70)

Sport
- Sport: Fencing

Tang Wing Keung (born 10 January 1956) is a Hong Kong fencer. He competed in the individual and team épée events at the 1988 Summer Olympics.
