= Mykhailo Tyshko =

Soviet fencer

Personal information
- Born: 15 January 1959 (age 67) Kharkiv, Ukrainian SSR, Soviet Union

Sport
- Sport: Fencing
Medal record
Men's fencing
Representing Soviet Union
Olympic Games
Bronze medal – third place	1988 Seoul	Épée, team

Mykhailo Tyshko (born 15 January 1959) is a Soviet fencer. He won a bronze medal in the team épée event at the 1988 Summer Olympics.
