= Michiel Driessen =

Dutch fencer (born 1959)

Personal information
- Born: 13 August 1959 (age 66) Amsterdam, Netherlands

Sport
- Sport: Fencing

Michiel Driessen (born 13 August 1959) is a Dutch fencer. He competed in the individual and team épée events at the 1988 Summer Olympics.
