= Witold Gadomski =

Polish fencer

Personal information
- Full name: Witold Rajmund Gadomski
- Nationality: Polish
- Born: 21 November 1967 (age 58) Warsaw, Poland

Sport
- Sport: Fencing

Witold Rajmund Gadomski (born 21 November 1967) is a Polish fencer. He competed in the individual and team épée events at the 1988 and 1992 Summer Olympics.
