= Szabolcs Pásztor =

Hungarian fencer (1959–2022)

Personal information
- Born: 10 September 1959 Miskolc, Hungary
- Died: 12 February 2022 (aged 62)

Sport
- Sport: Fencing

Szabolcs Pásztor (10 September 1959 – 12 February 2022) was a Hungarian fencer. He competed in the individual and team épée events at the 1988 Summer Olympics. Pásztor died in February 2022, at the age of 62.
