= Roberto Durão =

Portuguese fencer (born 1959)

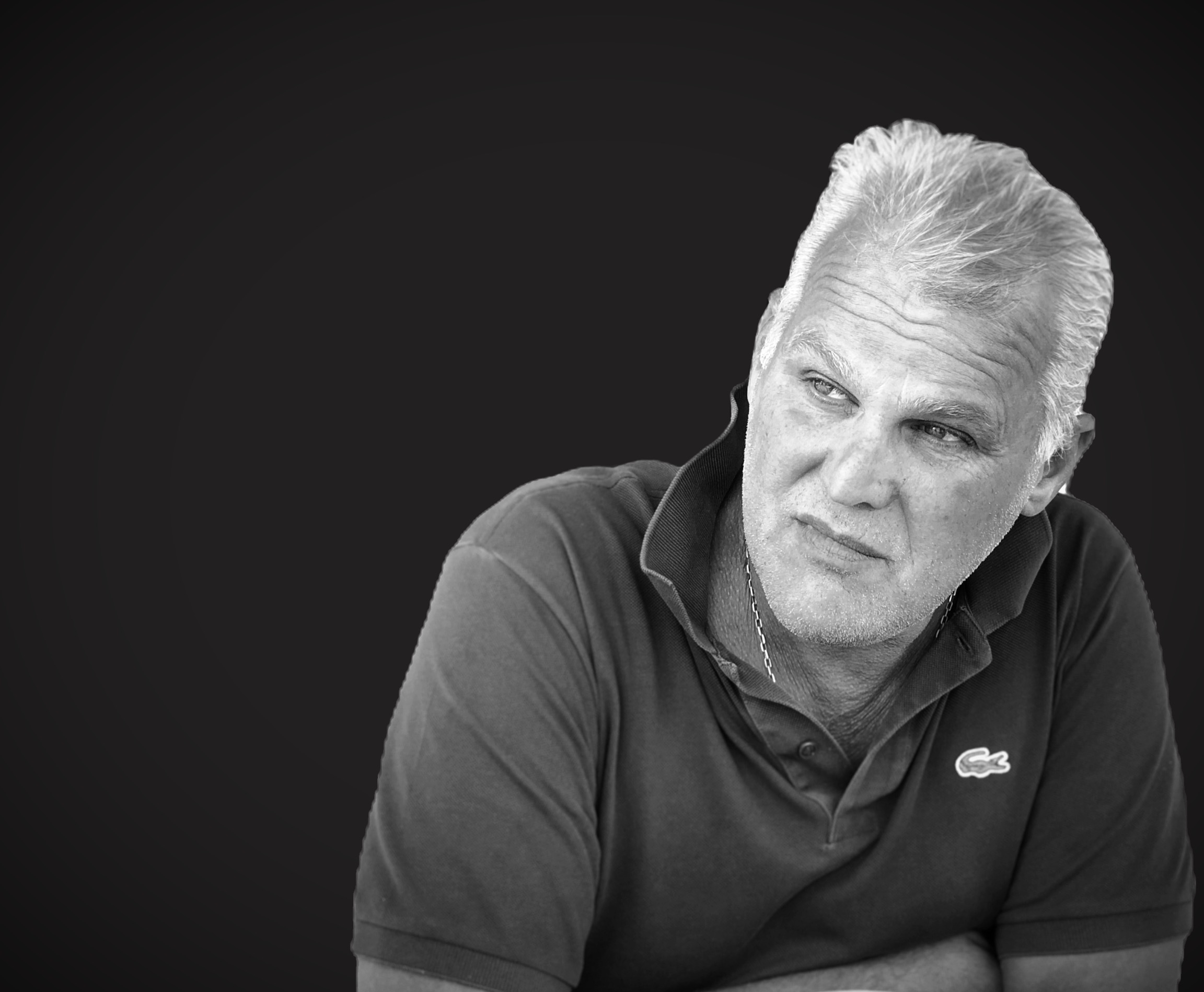

Personal information
- Nationality: Portuguese
- Born: Roberto Pedro Peig Dória Durão; 30 June 1959 (age 67) Lisbon, Portugal
- Height: 1.84 m (6 ft 0 in)
- Weight: 92 kg (203 lb)
- Website: www.robertodurao.com

Sport
- Country: Portugal
- Sport: Fencing, modern pentathlon, eventing

Roberto Durão (born 30 June 1959) is a Portuguese épée fencer and modern pentathlete. He competed in the modern pentathlon at the 1984 Summer Olympics and in the fencing at the 1988 Summer Olympics.
