= Óscar Pinto (fencer) =

Portuguese fencer

Personal information
- Born: 20 April 1962 (age 64)

Sport
- Sport: Fencing

Óscar Pinto (born 20 April 1962) is a Portuguese fencer. He competed in the individual épée event at the 1988 Summer Olympics.
