= Douglas Fonseca =

Brazilian fencer

Personal information
- Born: 28 September 1953 (age 72)

Sport
- Sport: Fencing

Douglas Fonseca (born 28 September 1953) is a Brazilian fencer. He competed in the foil and épée events at the 1988 Summer Olympics.
