= Fernando de la Peña =

Spanish fencer

Personal information
- Born: 22 August 1959 (age 66) Madrid, Spain

Sport
- Sport: Fencing

Fernando de la Peña (born 22 August 1959) is a Spanish fencer. He competed in the épée events at the 1988, 1992 and 1996 Summer Olympics.
