= Joaquin Pinto (fencer) =

Colombian fencer (born 1961)

Personal information
- Born: 25 February 1961 (age 65)

Sport
- Sport: Fencing

Joaquin Pinto (born 25 February 1961) is a Colombian fencer. He competed in the individual and team épée events at the 1988 Summer Olympics.
