= Juan Miguel Paz =

Colombian fencer (born 1966)

Personal information
- Born: 14 May 1966 (age 60) Leuven, Belgium

Sport
- Sport: Fencing
Medal record
Representing Colombia
Pan American Games
Silver medal – second place	1991 Havana	Team épée
Bronze medal – third place	1987 Indianapolis	Team épée
Bronze medal – third place	1991 Havana	Individual épée
Bronze medal – third place	1995 Mar del Plata	Team épée
Bronze medal – third place	1999 Winnipeg	Team épée

Juan Miguel Jorge Paz Dupriez (born 14 May 1966) is a Colombian fencer of Belgian descent. He competed in the épée events at the 1988, 1992 and 1996 Summer Olympics.
