= Jerri Bergström =

Swedish fencer

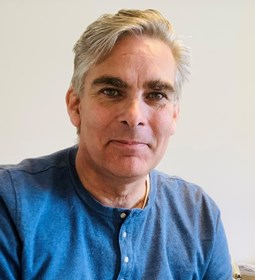

Personal information
- Born: 12 March 1963 (age 63) Solna, Sweden

Sport
- Sport: Fencing

Jerri Bergström (born 12 March 1963) is a Swedish fencer.

== Career ==
He competed in the épée events at the 1984, 1988 and 1992 Summer Olympics.
