= Antônio Machado =

Brazilian fencer

Personal information
- Born: 5 May 1964 (age 62)

Sport
- Sport: Fencing

Antônio Machado (born 5 May 1964) is a Brazilian fencer. He competed in the foil and épée events at the 1988 Summer Olympics.
