= Johannes Nagele =

Austrian fencer

Personal information
- Nationality: Austrian
- Born: 1 June 1964 (age 62)

Sport
- Country: Austria
- Sport: Fencing

Johannes Nagele (born 1 June 1964) is an Austrian fencer. He competed in the individual épée event at the 1988 Summer Olympics.
