= Michel Poffet =

Swiss fencer

Personal information
- Born: 24 August 1957 (age 68)

Sport
- Sport: Fencing
Medal record
Men's fencing
Representing Switzerland
Olympic Games
Bronze medal – third place	1976 Montréal	Épée, team

Michel Poffet (born 24 August 1957) is a Swiss fencer. He won a bronze medal in the team épée event at the 1976 Summer Olympics.
