= Stéphane Ganeff =

Belgian fencer (born 1959)

Personal information
- Born: 18 January 1959 (age 67) The Hague, Netherlands

Sport
- Sport: Fencing

Stéphane Ganeff (born 18 January 1959) is a Belgian fencer. He competed for Belgium at the 1980 and 1984 Summer Olympics and for the Netherlands at the 1988 Summer Olympics.
