= Cezary Siess =

Polish fencer (born 1968)

Personal information
- Born: 15 March 1968 (age 58) Gdańsk, Poland

Sport
- Sport: Fencing
Medal record
Men's fencing
Representing Poland
Olympic Games
Bronze medal – third place	1992 Barcelona	Foil, team

Cezary Siess (born 15 March 1968) is a Polish fencer. He won a bronze medal in the team foil event at the 1992 Summer Olympics.
