= Mauricio Rivas =

Colombian fencer (born 1964)

Personal information
- Born: 1 June 1964 (age 62) Cali, Colombia

Sport
- Sport: Fencing
Medal record
Men's Fencing
Representing Colombia
World Championships
Bronze medal – third place	1995 The Hague	Individual épée
Pan American Games
Silver medal – second place	1991 Havana	Team épée
Bronze medal – third place	1987 Indianapolis	Team épée
Bronze medal – third place	1995 Mar del Plata	Team épée
Bronze medal – third place	1999 Winnipeg	Team épée

Mauricio Rivas Nieto (born 1 June 1964) is a Colombian fencer. He competed in the épée events at the 1988, 1992, 1996 and 2000 Summer Olympics.
