= André Kuhn =

Swiss fencer

Personal information
- Nationality: Swiss
- Born: 8 February 1961 (age 65)
- Education: University of Neuchâtel, University of Lausanne, IDHEAP
- Occupation: university professor
- Employer: University of Neuchâtel

Sport
- Country: Switzerland
- Sport: Fencing

André Kuhn (born 8 February 1961 in La Chaux-de-Fonds) is a Swiss fencer and an ordinary professor of criminal law and criminology at the University of Neuchâtel since 2015. He competed in the épée events at the 1988 and 1992 Summer Olympics.

His doctoral thesis focused on the topic of "Punitivité, politique criminelle et surpeuplement carcéral : ou comment réduire la population carcérale" for which he received the Bippert Prize from the University Rectorate.

In terms of his personal life, he is married and has two children.
