= Stephen Trevor =

American fencer (born 1963)

Personal information
- Born: September 22, 1963 (age 62) Cleveland, Ohio, United States
- Height: 6 ft 9.5 in (207.0 cm)
- Weight: 170 lb (77 kg)

Sport
- Sport: Fencing
- Event: Epee
- College team: Columbia University

Stephen Spaulding Trevor (born September 22, 1963) is an American fencer who competed in the individual and team épée events at the 1984 and 1988 Summer Olympics.

== Early and personal life ==
He was born in Cleveland, Ohio. Trevor was a cum laude 1986 graduate of Columbia University with a Bachelor of Arts degree in Political Science and Psychology, and received an M.B.A. from Harvard Business School in 1992.

== Fencing career ==
Trevor fenced for the Columbia Lions fencing team, and has fenced for the New York Athletic Club. He competed in the individual and team épée events at the 1984 and 1988 Summer Olympics. Trevor won two silver medals in team épée, at the 1983 Pan American Games and the 1987 Pan American Games.

== Finance career ==
Trevor worked at Time Warner, Inc., and joined Goldman Sachs in 1992, working there for 15 years and becoming a Partner and a Managing Director in the Principal Investment area. He then joined Morgan Stanley in 2007, and worked there as co-head of the private equity business within Morgan Stanley Investment Management (MSIM), as well as co-head of Morgan Stanley Merchant Banking and Asset Management. In 2012, he joined Avenue Capital Group, a global investment firm, as a Senior Managing Director focusing on distressed-for-control investments.
