= Patrice Gaille =

Swiss fencer

Personal information
- Born: 15 April 1956 (age 70)

Sport
- Sport: Fencing

Patrice Gaille (born 15 April 1956) is a Swiss fencer. He competed at the 1976 and 1988 Summer Olympics.
