= Arwin Kardolus =

Dutch fencer (born 1964)

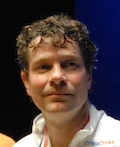
- Arwin Kardolus in 2007

Personal information
- Born: 10 August 1964 (age 61) The Hague, Netherlands

Sport
- Sport: Fencing

Arwin Kardolus (born 10 August 1964) is a Dutch fencer. He competed in the individual and team épée events at the 1988 Summer Olympics.
