= Fencing at the 1984 Summer Olympics – Men's foil =

Fencing at the Olympics

Men's foil at the Games of the XXIII Olympiad
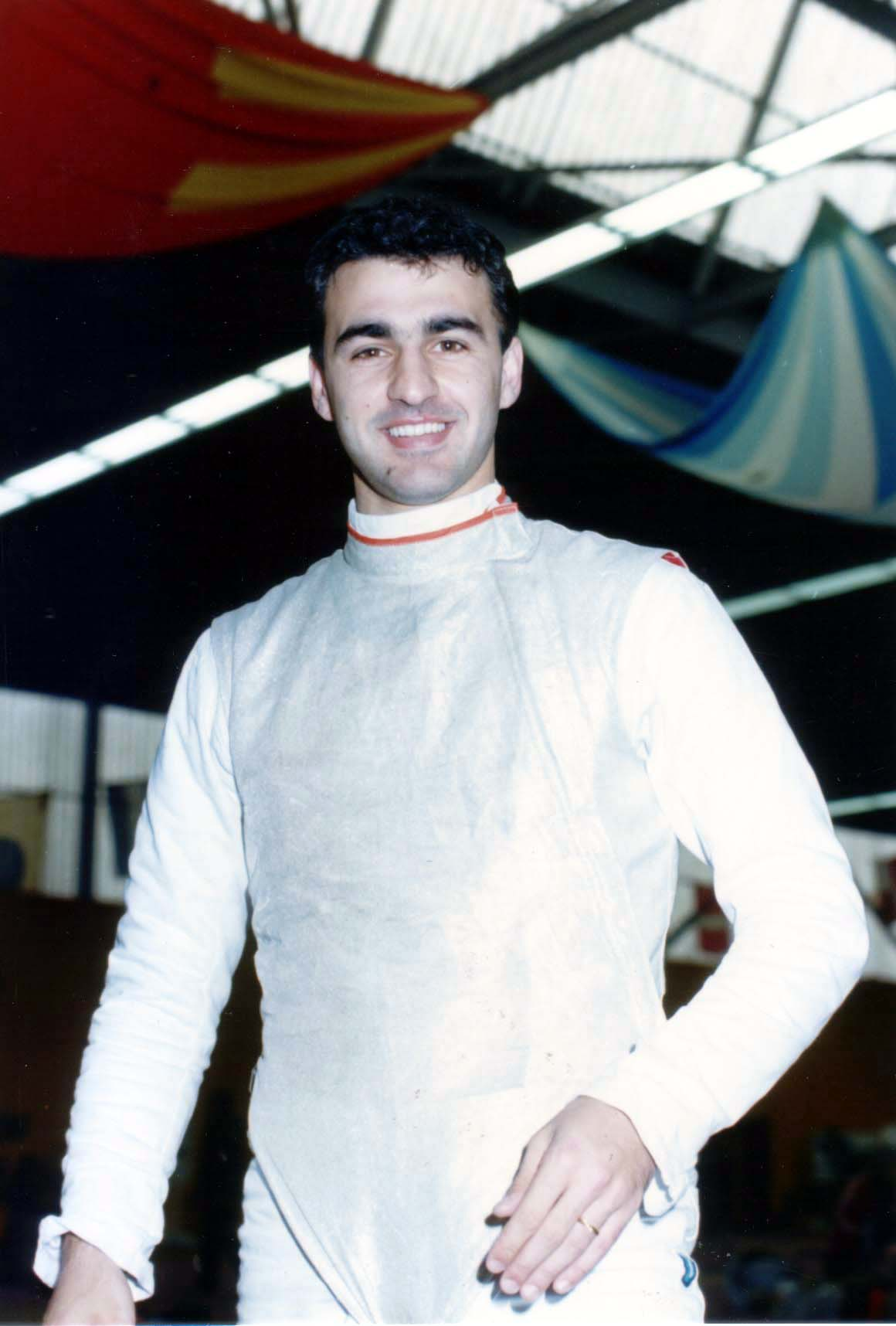
- Mauro Numa
- Venue: Long Beach Convention Center
- Dates: 1–2 August 1984
- Competitors: 58 from 26 nations

Medalists
1st place, gold medalist(s)		Mauro Numa	Italy
2nd place, silver medalist(s)		Matthias Behr	West Germany
3rd place, bronze medalist(s)		Stefano Cerioni	Italy

The men's foil was one of eight fencing events on the fencing at the 1984 Summer Olympics programme. It was the nineteenth appearance of the event. The competition was held from 1 to 2 August 1984. 58 fencers from 26 nations competed. Nations had been limited to three fencers each since 1928. The event was won by Mauro Numa of Italy, the nation's sixth victory in the men's foil (behind only France with seven). His countryman Stefano Cerioni took bronze. The silver medal went to Matthias Behr, West Germany's first medal in the event and the first medal for any German athlete since 1928. France's five-Games podium streak ended.

== Background ==
This was the 19th appearance of the event, which has been held at every Summer Olympics except 1908 (when there was a foil display only rather than a medal event). Two of the six finalists from 1980 returned: silver medalist Pascal Jolyot of France and sixth-place finisher Petru Kuki of Romania. The 1980 gold medalist, Vladimir Smirnov of the Soviet Union, had died after an accident during the 1982 world championships. The bronze medalist, Alexandr Romankov also of the Soviet Union, was kept out of the tournament, along with the other two 1980 finalists, due to the Soviet-led boycott. Romankov would have been a heavy favorite: he had won silver at the 1976 Games, bronze in 1980, and won the world championships in 1974, 1977, 1979, 1982, and 1983. In the absence of the Soviets, Poles, and Hungarians, the French, Italian, and West German teams were expected to dominate.

Bolivia, the People's Republic of China, Chinese Taipei, Jordan, Saudi Arabia, and the Virgin Islands each made their debut in the men's foil. France and the United States each made their 17th appearance, tied for most of any nation; France had missed only the 1904 (with fencers not traveling to St. Louis) and the 1912 (boycotted due to a dispute over rules) foil competitions, while the United States had missed the inaugural 1896 competition and boycotted the 1980 Games altogether.

== Competition format ==
The 1984 tournament used a three-phase format similar to that of 1976 and 1980, though the final phase was different.

The first phase was a multi-round round-robin pool play format; each fencer in a pool faced each other fencer in that pool once. There were three pool rounds:

- The first round had 10 pools of 5 or 6 fencers each, with the top 4 in each pool advancing.
- The second round had 8 pools of 5 fencers each, with the top 3 in each pool advancing.
- The third round had 4 pools of 6 fencers each, with the top 4 in each pool advancing.

The second phase was a truncated double-elimination tournament. Four fencers advanced to the final round through the winners brackets and four more advanced via the repechage.

The final phase was a single elimination tournament with a bronze medal match. (This was changed from a 6-man final round-robin pool in previous years.)

Bouts in the round-robin pools were to 5 touches; bouts in the double-elimination and final rounds were to 10 touches.

== Schedule ==
All times are Pacific Daylight Time (UTC-7)

Date	Time	Round
Wednesday, 1 August 1984	9:00	Round 1 Round 2 Round 3
Thursday, 2 August 1984	9:00 20:00	Double elimination round Quarterfinals; Semifinals; Finals
Friday, 3 August 1984	14:00	Finals

== Results ==
=== Round 1 ===
==== Round 1 Pool A ====
Pos	Fencer	W	L	TF	TA	Qual.	AB	SJ	HD	RB	MARHU
1	Andrea Borella (ITA)	4	0	20	8	Q		5–3	5–1	5–2	5–2
2	Stefan Joos (BEL)	2	2	17	13	Q	3–5		5–2	4–5	5–1
3	Henri Darricau (LIB)	2	2	13	16	Q	1–5	2–5		5–3	5–3
4	Robert Blaschka (AUT)	1	3	14	19	Q	2–5	5–4	3–5		4–5
5	Majed Abdul Rahim Habib Ullah (KSA)	1	3	11	19		2–5	1–5	3–5	5–4	

Source: Official Report, vol. 2, p. 395

==== Round 1 Pool B ====
Pos	Fencer	W	L	TF	TA	Qual.	KU	SE	SC	HY	JF
1	Kenichi Umezawa (JPN)	4	0	20	12	Q		5–4	5–3	5–3	5–2
2	Shlomo Eyal (ISR)	3	1	19	9	Q	4–5		5–2	5–1	5–1
3	Stefano Cerioni (ITA)	2	2	15	10	Q	3–5	2–5		5–0	5–0
4	Haluk Yamaç (TUR)	1	3	9	16	Q	3–5	1–5	0–5		5–1
5	Julito Francis (ISV)	0	4	4	20		2–5	1–5	0–5	1–5	

Source: Official Report, vol. 2, p. 395

==== Round 1 Pool C ====
Pos	Fencer	W	L	TF	TA	Qual.	IH	PO	NA	ST	KYF	SM
1	Itzhak Hatuel (ISR)	5	0	25	10	Q		5–4	5–2	5–2	5–2	5–0
2	Philippe Omnès (FRA)	4	1	24	15	Q	4–5		5–1	5–4	5–2	5–3
3	Nobuyuki Azuma (JPN)	3	2	18	15	Q	2–5	1–5		5–2	5–2	5–1
4	Sergio Turiace (ARG)	1	4	17	21	Q	2–5	4–5	2–5		4–5	5–1
5	Ko Yin Fai (HKG)	1	4	14	24		2–5	2–5	2–5	5–4		3–5
6	Saul Mendoza (BOL)	1	4	10	23		0–5	3–5	1–5	1–5	5–3	

Source: Official Report, vol. 2, p. 395

==== Round 1 Pool D ====
Pos	Fencer	W	L	TF	TA	Qual.	MN	PJ	SL	TS	DH	AJ
1	Mauro Numa (ITA)	5	0	25	7	Q		5–3	5–0	5–3	5–1	5–0
2	Pascal Jolyot (FRA)	4	1	23	14	Q	3–5		5–2	5–4	5–3	5–0
3	Sergio Luchetti (ARG)	3	2	17	15	Q	0–5	2–5		5–2	5–3	5–0
4	Tadashi Shimokawa (JPN)	2	3	19	15	Q	3–5	4–5	2–5		5–0	5–0
5	Dany Haddad (LIB)	1	4	12	20		1–5	3–5	3–5	0–5		5–0
6	Ayman Jumean (JOR)	0	5	0	25		0–5	0–5	0–5	0–5	0–5	

Source: Official Report, vol. 2, p. 395

==== Round 1 Pool E ====
Pos	Fencer	W	L	TF	TA	Qual.	MG	JRM	JW	ED	AAA	JK
1	Matthias Gey (FRG)	5	0	25	6	Q		5–4	5–0	5–0	5–0	5–2
2	José Rafael Magallanes (VEN)	4	1	24	16	Q	4–5		5–3	5–4	5–4	5–0
3	Joachim Wendt (AUT)	3	2	18	15	Q	0–5	3–5		5–2	5–1	5–2
4	Edgardo Díaz (PUR)	2	3	16	21	Q	0–5	4–5	2–5		5–4	5–2
5	Ahmed Al-Ahmed (KUW)	1	4	14	22		0–5	4–5	1–5	4–5		5–2
6	James Kreglo (ISV)	0	5	8	25		2–5	0–5	2–5	2–5	2–5	

Source: Official Report, vol. 2, p. 395

==== Round 1 Pool F ====
Pos	Fencer	W	L	TF	TA	Qual.	LY	HH	NB	GS	LTC	AAZ
1	Liu Yunhong (CHN)	4	1	22	12	Q		2–5	5–4	5–1	5–2	5–0
2	Harald Hein (FRG)	4	1	24	15	Q	5–2		4–5	5–4	5–1	5–3
3	Nick Bell (GBR)	3	2	19	17	Q	4–5	5–4		0–5	5–2	5–1
4	Georg Somloi (AUT)	2	3	18	18	Q	1–5	4–5	5–0		5–3	3–5
5	Lee Tai-Chung (TPE)	1	4	13	22		2–5	1–5	2–5	3–5		5–2
6	Abdullah Al-Zawayed (KSA)	1	4	11	23		0–5	3–5	1–5	5–3	2–5	

Source: Official Report, vol. 2, p. 395

==== Round 1 Pool G ====
Pos	Fencer	W	L	TF	TA	Qual.	MB	GB	YY	AMEH	LTC	JN
1	Matthias Behr (FRG)	5	0	25	14	Q		5–4	5–4	5–2	5–0	5–4
2	Greg Benko (AUS)	4	1	24	10	Q	4–5		5–1	5–2	5–2	5–0
3	Yu Yifeng (CHN)	3	2	20	13	Q	4–5	1–5		5–2	5–0	5–1
4	Abdel Monem El-Husseini (EGY)	2	3	16	19	Q	2–5	2–5	2–5		5–3	5–1
5	Lam Tak Chuen (HKG)	1	4	10	23		0–5	2–5	0–5	3–5		5–3
6	Jeppe Normann (NOR)	0	5	9	25		4–5	0–5	1–5	1–5	3–5	

Source: Official Report, vol. 2, p. 396

==== Round 1 Pool H ====
Pos	Fencer	W	L	TF	TA	Qual.	PH	FP	PL	CS	KFAR	HD
1	Pierre Harper (GBR)	4	1	24	11	Q		5–2	5–3	4–5	5–1	5–0
2	Frédéric Pietruszka (FRA)	4	1	22	14	Q	2–5		5–1	5–1	5–3	5–4
3	Peter Lewison (USA)	3	2	19	16	Q	3–5	1–5		5–1	5–2	5–3
4	Chu Shisheng (CHN)	3	2	17	18	Q	5–4	1–5	1–5		5–0	5–4
5	Khaled Fahd Al-Rasheed (KSA)	1	4	11	21		1–5	3–5	2–5	0–5		5–1
6	Henri Darricau (LIB)	0	5	12	25		0–5	4–5	3–5	4–5	1–5	

Source: Official Report, vol. 2, p. 396

==== Round 1 Pool I ====
Pos	Fencer	W	L	TF	TA	Qual.	PJ	PK	MM	KAA	AD	TSH
1	Peter Joos (BEL)	4	1	22	11	Q		5–0	2–5	5–3	5–3	5–0
2	Petru Kuki (ROU)	3	2	18	14	Q	0–5		5–4	3–5	5–0	5–0
3	Mike McCahey (USA)	3	2	21	17	Q	5–2	4–5		5–3	2–5	5–2
4	Khaled Al-Awadhi (KUW)	3	2	21	20	Q	3–5	5–3	3–5		5–3	5–4
5	Ahmed Diab (EGY)	2	3	16	21		3–5	0–5	5–2	3–5		5–4
6	Tsai Shing-Hsiang (TPE)	0	5	10	25		0–5	0–5	2–5	4–5	4–5	

Source: Official Report, vol. 2, p. 396

==== Round 1 Pool J ====
Pos	Fencer	W	L	TF	TA	Qual.	BG	GM	TS	BR	LYL	KAM
1	Bill Gosbee (GBR)	4	1	22	13	Q		2–5	5–0	5–3	5–1	5–4
2	Greg Massialas (USA)	4	1	23	14	Q	5–2		3–5	5–3	5–1	5–3
3	Thierry Soumagne (BEL)	4	1	20	12	Q	0–5	5–3		5–1	5–1	5–2
4	Bilal Rifaat (EGY)	2	3	17	21	Q	3–5	3–5	1–5		5–2	5–4
5	Lai Yee Lap (HKG)	1	4	10	21		1–5	1–5	1–5	2–5		5–1
6	Kifah Al-Mutawa (KUW)	0	5	14	25		4–5	3–5	2–5	4–5	1–5	

Source: Official Report, vol. 2, p. 396

=== Round 2 ===
==== Round 2 Pool A ====
Pos	Fencer	W	L	TF	TA	Qual.	MG	FP	TSo	GS	TSh
1	Matthias Gey (FRG)	3	1	18	8	Q		3–5	5–1	5–1	5–1
2	Frédéric Pietruszka (FRA)	3	1	19	10	Q	5–3		5–2	5–0	4–5
3	Thierry Soumagne (BEL)	2	2	13	14	Q	1–5	2–5		5–4	5–0
4	Georg Somloi (AUT)	1	3	10	15		1–5	0–5	4–5		5–0
5	Tadashi Shimokawa (JPN)	1	3	6	19		1–5	5–4	0–5	0–5	

Source: Official Report, vol. 2, p. 396

==== Round 2 Pool B ====
Pos	Fencer	W	L	TF	TA	Qual.	MN	SJ	JRM	HH	HD
1	Mauro Numa (ITA)	3	1	19	11	Q		4–5	5–1	5–4	5–1
2	Stefan Joos (BEL)	3	1	16	14	Q	5–4		1–5	5–1	5–4
3	José Rafael Magallanes (VEN)	2	2	15	12	Q	1–5	5–1		4–5	5–1
4	Harald Hein (FRG)	2	2	15	15		4–5	1–5	5–4		5–1
5	Henri Darricau (LIB)	0	4	7	20		1–5	4–5	1–5	1–5	

Source: Official Report, vol. 2, p. 396

==== Round 2 Pool C ====
Pos	Fencer	W	L	TF	TA	Qual.	PO	IH	SC	YY	BR
1	Philippe Omnès (FRA)	4	0	20	7	Q		5–1	5–2	5–2	5–2
2	Itzhak Hatuel (ISR)	2	2	14	11	Q	1–5		3–5	5–0	5–1
3	Stefano Cerioni (ITA)	2	2	13	16	Q	2–5	5–3		1–5	5–3
4	Yu Yifeng (CHN)	1	3	10	16		2–5	0–5	5–1		3–5
5	Bilal Rifaat (EGY)	1	3	11	18		2–5	1–5	3–5	5–3	

Source: Official Report, vol. 2, p. 396

==== Round 2 Pool D ====
Pos	Fencer	W	L	TF	TA	Qual.	AB	CS	SE	PJ	ED
1	Andrea Borella (ITA)	4	0	20	8	Q		5–0	5–3	5–2	5–3
2	Chu Shisheng (CHN)	3	1	15	13	Q	0–5		5–4	5–1	5–3
3	Shlomo Eyal (ISR)	2	2	17	12	Q	3–5	4–5		5–2	5–0
4	Pascal Jolyot (FRA)	1	3	10	16		2–5	1–5	2–5		5–1
5	Edgardo Díaz (PUR)	0	4	7	20		3–5	3–5	0–5	1–5	

Source: Official Report, vol. 2, p. 396

==== Round 2 Pool E ====
Pos	Fencer	W	L	TF	TA	Qual.	MB	AMEH	PK	GM	NB
1	Matthias Behr (FRG)	4	0	20	10	Q		5–2	5–3	5–3	5–2
2	Abdel Monem El-Husseini (EGY)	2	2	16	15	Q	2–5		5–1	4–5	5–4
3	Petru Kuki (ROU)	2	2	14	16	Q	3–5	1–5		5–3	5–3
4	Greg Massialas (USA)	1	3	15	19		3–5	5–4	3–5		4–5
5	Nick Bell (GBR)	1	3	14	19		2–5	4–5	3–5	5–4	

Source: Official Report, vol. 2, p. 396

==== Round 2 Pool F ====
Pos	Fencer	W	L	TF	TA	Qual.	RB	BG	KU	MM	KAA
1	Robert Blaschka (AUT)	3	1	18	13	Q		5–3	3–5	5–1	5–4
2	Bill Gosbee (GBR)	3	1	18	14	Q	3–5		5–4	5–2	5–3
3	Kenichi Umezawa (JPN)	3	1	19	15	Q	5–3	4–5		5–3	5–4
4	Mike McCahey (USA)	1	3	11	16		1–5	2–5	3–5		5–1
5	Khaled Al-Awadhi (KUW)	0	4	12	20		4–5	3–5	4–5	1–5	

Source: Official Report, vol. 2, p. 396

==== Round 2 Pool G ====
Pos	Fencer	W	L	TF	TA	Qual.	LY	NA	GB	HY	SL
1	Liu Yunhong (CHN)	3	1	18	14	Q		5–3	5–3	3–5	5–3
2	Nobuyuki Azuma (JPN)	2	2	15	11	Q	3–5		2–5	5–1	5–0
3	Greg Benko (AUS)	2	2	16	15	Q	3–5	5–2		3–5	5–3
4	Haluk Yamaç (TUR)	2	2	13	16		5–3	1–5	5–3		2–5
5	Sergio Luchetti (ARG)	1	3	11	17		3–5	0–5	3–5	5–2	

Source: Official Report, vol. 2, p. 397

==== Round 2 Pool H ====
Pos	Fencer	W	L	TF	TA	Qual.	JW	PL	PJ	PH	ST
1	Joachim Wendt (AUT)	3	1	18	11	Q		4–5	5–2	5–2	5–2
2	Peter Lewison (USA)	3	1	17	14	Q	5–4		2–5	5–4	5–1
3	Peter Joos (BEL)	2	2	15	13	Q	2–5	5–2		3–5	5–1
4	Pierre Harper (GBR)	2	2	16	17		2–5	4–5	5–3		5–4
5	Sergio Turiace (ARG)	0	4	8	20		2–5	1–5	1–5	4–5	

Source: Official Report, vol. 2, p. 397

=== Round 3 ===
==== Round 3 Pool A ====
Pos	Fencer	W	L	TF	TA	Qual.	PO	SC	MN	IH	NA	BG
1	Philippe Omnès (FRA)	4	1	24	14	Q		5–4	4–5	5–2	5–3	5–0
2	Stefano Cerioni (ITA)	4	1	24	15	Q	4–5		5–3	5–3	5–2	5–2
3	Mauro Numa (ITA)	3	2	21	16	Q	5–4	3–5		3–5	5–1	5–1
4	Itzhak Hatuel (ISR)	3	2	20	20	Q	2–5	3–5	5–3		5–4	5–3
5	Nobuyuki Azuma (JPN)	1	4	15	24		3–5	2–5	1–5	4–5		5–4
6	Bill Gosbee (GBR)	0	5	10	25		0–5	2–5	1–5	3–5	4–5	

Source: Official Report, vol. 2, p. 397

==== Round 3 Pool B ====
Pos	Fencer	W	L	TF	TA	Qual.	AB	RB	TS	LY	SE	JRM
1	Andrea Borella (ITA)	5	0	25	11	Q		5–3	5–2	5–3	5–0	5–3
2	Robert Blaschka (AUT)	4	1	23	12	Q	3–5		5–3	5–1	5–2	5–1
3	Thierry Soumagne (BEL)	3	2	20	18	Q	2–5	3–5		5–2	5–3	5–2
4	Liu Yunhong (CHN)	2	3	16	20	Q	3–5	1–5	2–5		5–3	5–2
5	Shlomo Eyal (ISR)	1	4	13	20		0–5	2–5	3–5	3–5		5–0
6	José Rafael Magallanes (VEN)	0	5	9	25		3–5	1–5	3–5	2–5	0–5	

Source: Official Report, vol. 2, p. 397

==== Round 3 Pool C ====
Pos	Fencer	W	L	TF	TA	Qual.	MB	KU	PK	AMEH	JW	SJ
1	Matthias Behr (FRG)	4	1	24	14	Q		4–5	5–3	5–1	5–4	5–1
2	Kenichi Umezawa (JPN)	4	1	22	17	Q	5–4		2–5	5–2	5–2	5–4
3	Petru Kuki (ROU)	3	2	22	19	Q	3–5	5–2		4–5	5–3	5–4
4	Abdel Monem El-Husseini (EGY)	3	2	18	22	Q	1–5	2–5	5–4		5–4	5–4
5	Joachim Wendt (AUT)	1	4	18	23		4–5	2–5	3–5	4–5		5–3
6	Stefan Joos (BEL)	0	5	16	25		1–5	4–5	4–5	4–5	3–5	

Source: Official Report, vol. 2, p. 397

==== Round 3 Pool D ====
Pos	Fencer	W	L	TF	TA	Qual.	MG	CS	FP	PL	GB	PJ
1	Matthias Gey (FRG)	5	0	25	8	Q		5–1	5–2	5–2	5–1	5–2
2	Chu Shisheng (CHN)	3	2	20	13	Q	1–5		4–5	5–0	5–2	5–1
3	Frédéric Pietruszka (FRA)	3	2	19	22	Q	2–5	5–4		5–4	2–5	5–4
4	Peter Lewison (USA)	2	3	16	22	Q	2–5	0–5	4–5		5–4	5–3
5	Greg Benko (AUS)	1	4	16	22		1–5	2–5	5–2	4–5		4–5
6	Peter Joos (BEL)	1	4	15	24		2–5	1–5	4–5	3–5	5–4	

Source: Official Report, vol. 2, p. 397

=== Double elimination rounds ===
==== Winners brackets ====
===== Winners group 1 =====
Round of 16		Round of 8
Andrea Borella (ITA)	10
Abdel Monem El-Husseini (EGY)	9	Andrea Borella (ITA)	9
Frédéric Pietruszka (FRA)	10	Frédéric Pietruszka (FRA)	10
Chu Shisheng (CHN)	4

===== Winners group 2 =====
Round of 16		Round of 8
Robert Blaschka (AUT)	3
Thierry Soumagne (BEL)	10	Thierry Soumagne (BEL)	2
Petru Kuki (ROU)	9	Matthias Behr (FRG)	10
Matthias Behr (FRG)	10

===== Winners group 3 =====
Round of 16		Round of 8
Philippe Omnès (FRA)	10
Liu Yunhong (CHN)	5	Philippe Omnès (FRA)	6
Stefano Cerioni (ITA)	10	Stefano Cerioni (ITA)	10
Kenichi Umezawa (JPN)	5

===== Winners group 4 =====
Round of 16		Round of 8
Mauro Numa (ITA)	10
Itzhak Hatuel (ISR)	2	Mauro Numa (ITA)	10
Peter Lewison (USA)	7	Matthias Gey (FRG)	6
Matthias Gey (FRG)	10

==== Losers brackets ====
===== Losers group 1 =====
Round of 4		Round of 2
Abdel Monem El-Husseini (EGY)	10
Chu Shisheng (CHN)	5	Abdel Monem El-Husseini (EGY)	3
		Matthias Gey (FRG)	10

===== Losers group 2 =====
Round of 4		Round of 2
Robert Blaschka (AUT)	4
Petru Kuki (ROU)	10	Petru Kuki (ROU)	7
		Philippe Omnès (FRA)	10

===== Losers group 3 =====
Round of 4		Round of 2
Liu Yunhong (CHN)	10
Kenichi Umezawa (JPN)	7	Liu Yunhong (CHN)	5
		Thierry Soumagne (BEL)	10

===== Losers group 4 =====
Round of 4		Round of 2
Itzhak Hatuel (ISR)	8
Peter Lewison (USA)	10	Peter Lewison (USA)	4
		Andrea Borella (ITA)	10

=== Final round ===
Quarterfinals
Matthias Behr (FRG)	10
Thierry Soumagne (BEL)	5
Andrea Borella (ITA)	6
Frédéric Pietruszka (FRA)	10
Stefano Cerioni (ITA)	11
Matthias Gey (FRG)	9
Philippe Omnès (FRA)	8
Mauro Numa (ITA)	10

Semifinals
Matthias Behr (FRG)	10
Frédéric Pietruszka (FRA)	7
Stefano Cerioni (ITA)	9
Mauro Numa (ITA)	11

Finals
Matthias Behr (FRG)	11
Mauro Numa (ITA)	12
Third place
Frédéric Pietruszka (FRA)	5
Stefano Cerioni (ITA)	10

== Final classification ==
Fencer	Country
Mauro Numa	Italy
Matthias Behr	West Germany
Stefano Cerioni	Italy
Frédéric Pietruszka	France
Andrea Borella	Italy
Matthias Gey	West Germany
Philippe Omnès	France
Thierry Soumagne	Belgium
Petru Kuki	Romania
Liu Yunhong	China
Peter Lewison	United States
Abdel Monem El-Husseini	Egypt
Robert Blaschka	Austria
Kenichi Umezawa	Japan
Chu Shisheng	China
Itzhak Hatuel	Israel
Joachim Wendt	Austria
Greg Benko	Australia
Shlomo Eyal	Israel
Nobuyuki Azuma	Japan
Peter Joos	Belgium
Stefan Joos	Belgium
Bill Gosbee	Great Britain
José Rafael Magallanes	Venezuela
Harald Hein	West Germany
Pierre Harper	Great Britain
Haluk Yamaç	Turkey
Greg Massialas	United States
Georg Somloi	Austria
Mike McCahey	United States
Nick Bell	Great Britain
Yu Yifeng	China
Pascal Jolyot	France
Sergio Luchetti	Argentina
Bilal Rifaat	Egypt
Tadashi Shimokawa	Japan
Khaled Al-Awadhi	Kuwait
Sergio Turiace	Argentina
Henri Darricau	Lebanon
Edgardo Díaz	Puerto Rico
Ahmed Diab	Egypt
Majed Abdul Rahim Habib Ullah	Saudi Arabia
Dany Haddad	Lebanon
Ahmed Al-Ahmed	Kuwait
Lee Tai-Chung	Chinese Taipei
Khaled Fahd Al-Rasheed	Saudi Arabia
Ko Yin Fai	Hong Kong
Lai Yee Lap	Hong Kong
Abdullah Al-Zawayed	Saudi Arabia
Saul Mendoza	Bolivia
Lam Tak Chuen	Hong Kong
Kifah Al-Mutawa	Kuwait
Yves Daniel Darricau	Lebanon
Tsai Shing-Hsiang	Chinese Taipei
Julito Francis	Virgin Islands
Jeppe Normann	Norway
James Kreglo	Virgin Islands
Ayman Jumean	Jordan
