= Fencing at the 1984 Summer Olympics – Men's team foil =

Men's team foil at the Games of the XXIII Olympiad
- Venue: Long Beach Convention Center
- Dates: 4 – 5 August 1984
- Competitors: 65 from 14 nations

Medalists
1st place, gold medalist(s)		Mauro Numa; Andrea Borella; Andrea Cipressa; Stefano Cerioni; Angelo Scuri	Italy
2nd place, silver medalist(s)		Harald Hein; Matthias Behr; Matthias Gey; Klaus Reichert; Frank Beck	West Germany
3rd place, bronze medalist(s)		Frédéric Pietruszka; Pascal Jolyot; Patrick Groc; Philippe Omnès; Marc Cerboni	France

The men's team foil was one of eight fencing events on the fencing at the 1984 Summer Olympics programme. It was the sixteenth appearance of the event. The competition was held from 4 to 5 August 1984. 65 fencers from 14 nations competed.

== Rosters ==
Argentina

- Csaba Gaspar
- Sergio Luchetti
- Marcelo Magnasco
- Sergio Turiace

Austria

- Joachim Wendt
- Dieter Kotlowski
- Georg Somloi
- Robert Blaschka
- Georg Loisel

Belgium

- Thierry Soumagne
- Peter Joos
- Stefan Joos
- Stéphane Ganeff

China

- Chu Shisheng
- Cui Yining
- Yu Yifeng
- Wang Wei
- Zhang Jian
- Liu Yunhong

Egypt

- Ahmed Diab
- Abdel Monem El-Husseini
- Bilal Rifaat
- Khaled Soliman

France

- Frédéric Pietruszka
- Pascal Jolyot
- Patrick Groc
- Philippe Omnès
- Marc Cerboni

Great Britain

- Bill Gosbee
- Pierre Harper
- Nick Bell
- Rob Bruniges
- Graham Paul

Hong Kong

- Ko Yin Fai
- Lai Yee Lap
- Lam Tak Chuen
- Liu Chi On

Italy

- Mauro Numa
- Andrea Borella
- Andrea Cipressa
- Stefano Cerioni
- Angelo Scuri

Japan

- Nobuyuki Azuma
- Yoshihiko Kanatsu
- Hidehachi Koyasu
- Tadashi Shimokawa
- Kenichi Umezawa

Kuwait

- Ahmed Al-Ahmed
- Khaled Al-Awadhi
- Kifah Al-Mutawa
- Mohamed Ghaloum

Lebanon

- Henri Darricau
- Yves Daniel Darricau
- Dany Haddad
- Michel Youssef

United States

- Mike Marx
- Greg Massialas
- Peter Lewison
- Mark Smith
- Mike McCahey

West Germany

- Harald Hein
- Matthias Behr
- Matthias Gey
- Klaus Reichert
- Frank Beck

== Results ==
=== Round 1 ===
==== Round 1 Pool A ====
The United States and Italy each defeated Egypt, 9–2 and 9–1, respectively. The two victors then faced off. Italy won 9–3.

Pos	Team	W	L	BW	BL	Qual.	ITA	USA	EGY
1	Italy	2	0	18	4	Q		9–3	9–1
2	United States	1	1	12	11	Q	3–9		9–2
3	Egypt	0	2	3	18		1–9	2–9	

Source: Official Report, vol. 2, p. 405

==== Round 1 Pool B ====
In the first set of matches, West Germany beat Hong Kong 9–1 and Great Britain defeated Japan 8–8 (64–60 on touches). The second set saw the winners both win again (securing advancement) and the loser both lose again (resulting in elimination), as West Germany prevailed over Japan 9–4 and Great Britain won against Hong Kong 9–0. Finally, West Germany took the top spot in the group by beating Great Britain 9–2 while Hong Kong finished last after losing to Japan 9–1.

Pos	Team	W	L	BW	BL	Qual.	FRG	GBR	JPN	HKG
1	West Germany	3	0	27	6	Q		9–2	9–4	9–0
2	Great Britain	2	1	19	17	Q	2–9		8.64–8.60	9–0
3	Japan	1	2	21	18		4–9	8.60–8.64		9–1
4	Hong Kong	0	3	1	27		0–9	0–9	1–9	

Source: Official Report, vol. 2, pp. 405, 407

==== Round 1 Pool C ====
Austria and France each defeated Argentina, 9–4 and 9–2, respectively. The two victors then faced off. France won 9–4.

Pos	Team	W	L	BW	BL	Qual.	FRA	AUT	ARG
1	France	2	0	18	6	Q		9–4	9–2
2	Austria	1	1	13	13	Q	4–9		9–4
3	Argentina	0	2	6	18		2–9	4–9	

Source: Official Report, vol. 2, p. 407

==== Round 1 Pool D ====
In the first set of matches, Belgium beat Kuwait 9–1 and China defeated Lebanon 9–4. The second set saw the winners both win again (securing advancement) and the loser both lose again (resulting in elimination), as Belgium prevailed over Lebanon 9–0 and China won against Kuwait 9–3. Finally, Belgium took the top spot in the group by beating China 8–8 (60–58 on touches) while Lebanon finished last after forfeiting to Kuwait.

Pos	Team	W	L	BW	BL	Qual.	BEL	CHN	KUW	LIB
1	Belgium	3	0	26	9	Q		8.60–8.58	9–1	9–0
2	China	2	1	26	15	Q	8.58–8.60		9–3	9–4
3	Kuwait	1	2	4	18		1–9	3–9		
4	Lebanon	0	3	4	18		0–9	4–9		

Source: Official Report, vol. 2, pp. 407–08

=== Elimination rounds ===
Fifth place
B2	Great Britain	6
A2	United States	9
Seventh place
D2	China	WO
D1	Belgium	DNS

Consolation semifinals
B2	Great Britain	9
D2	China	4
D1	Belgium	DNS
A2	United States	WO

Quarterfinals
A1	Italy	9
B2	Great Britain	2
C1	France	9
D2	China	4
D1	Belgium	4
C2	Austria	9
B1	West Germany	9
A2	United States	2

Semifinals
A1	Italy	9
C1	France	7
C2	Austria	3
B1	West Germany	9

Final
A1	Italy	8
B1	West Germany	7
Third place
C1	France	9
C2	Austria	3
