= Hong Kong at the 1984 Summer Olympics =

- IOC code: HKG
- NOC: Sports Federation and Olympic Committee of Hong Kong

in Los Angeles
- Competitors: 47 in 10 sports
- Flag bearer: Lee Kui Nang Solomon
- Officials: ?
- Medals: Gold 0 Silver 0 Bronze 0 Total 0

Summer Olympics appearances (overview)
- 1952; 1956; 1960; 1964; 1968; 1972; 1976; 1980; 1984; 1988; 1992; 1996; 2000; 2004; 2008; 2012; 2016; 2020; 2024; 2028

Hong Kong competed at the 1984 Summer Olympics in Los Angeles, United States. The territory returned to the Olympic Games after participating in the American-led boycott of the 1980 Summer Olympics. 47 competitors, 36 men and 11 women, took part in 47 events in 10 sports.

== Archery ==
Women's Individual Competition:

- Macy Lau – 2326 points (→ 37th place)
- Ng Wing-Na – 2148 points (→ 45th place)
- Wang-Lau So-Han – 2056 points (→ 47th place)

Men's Individual Competition:

- Steve Yuen – 2223 points (→ 54th place)
- Lo Kam Kuen – 2193 points (→ 56th place)
- Fok Ming-Shan – 2165 points (→ 57th place)

== Athletics ==
Men's High Jump

- Lam Tin-Sau — 2.10m (→ did not advance)

Women's Marathon

- Winnie Lai Chu Ng

- Final — 2:42:38 (→ 31st place)

- Yuko Gordon

- Final — 2:46:12 (→ 34th place)

== Canoeing ==
- Ng Hin Wan – Men's K-1 500 metres
- Tsoi Ngai Won – Men's K-1 1000 metres
- Tang Kwok Cheung and Tsoi Ngai Won – Men's K-2 500 metres
- Cheung Chak Chuen, Ng Hin Wan, Ng Tsuen Man, and Tang Kwok Cheung – Men's K-4 1000 metres
- Ho Kim Fai – Women's K-1 500 metres
- Ho Kim Fai and To Kit Yong – Women's K-2 500 metres

== Cycling ==
Four cyclists represented Hong Kong in 1984.

Individual road race

- Choy Yiu Chung – did not finish (→ no ranking)
- Hung Chung Yam – did not finish (→ no ranking)
- Law Siu On – did not finish (→ no ranking)
- Leung Hung Tak – did not finish (→ no ranking)

Team time trial

- Choy Yiu Chung
- Hung Chung Yam
- Law Siu On
- Leung Hung Tak

== Diving ==
Men's 3m Springboard

- Andy Kwan

- Preliminary Round — 433.89 (→ did not advance, 24th place)

- Kam Yang Wai

- Preliminary Round — 387.63 (→ did not advance, 27th place)

== Fencing ==
Five fencers, all men, represented Hong Kong in 1984.

Men's foil

- Ko Yin Fai
- Lai Yee Lap
- Lam Tak Chuen

Men's team foil

- Ko Yin Fai, Lai Yee Lap, Lam Tak Chuen, Liu Chi On

Men's épée

- Denis Cunningham
- Liu Chi On
- Lam Tak Chuen

Men's team épée

- Denis Cunningham, Lai Yee Lap, Lam Tak Chuen, Liu Chi On

== Judo ==
- Yeung Luen Lin – Men's 60 kg
- Chong Siao Chin – Men's 65 kg
- Tan Chin Kee – Men's 71 kg
- Li Chung Tai – Men's 78 kg

== Sailing ==
- Windglider - Ken Choi

== Shooting ==
- Men's 50 metre rifle prone - Peter Rull Jr.
- Men's 50 metre pistol - Gilbert U
- Men's 25 metre rapid fire pistol - Solomon Lee, Ho Chung Kin
- Mixed trap - Micky Cheng
- Mixed skeet - Chow Tsun Man, Anthony Chuang

== Swimming ==
Men's 100m Freestyle

- Khai-Kam Li

- Heat — 53.48 (→ did not advance, 36th place)

Men's 200m Freestyle

- Tsang Yi Ming

- Heat — 2:03.11 (→ did not advance, 48th place)

- Ng Wing Hon

- Heat — 2:03.66 (→ did not advance, 49th place)

Men's 100m Breaststroke

- Watt Kam Sing

- Heat — 1:08.07 (→ did not advance, 37th place)

- Li Khai Kam

- Heat — 1:08.75 (→ did not advance, 39th place)

Men's 200m Breaststroke

- Watt Kam-Sing

- Heat — 2:32.13 (→ did not advance, 38th place)

Men's 100m Butterfly

- Tsang Yi Ming

- Heat — 58.25 (→ did not advance, 38th place)

Men's 200m Butterfly

- Tsang Yi Ming

- Heat — 2:08.44 (→ did not advance, 29th place)

Men's 200m Individual Medley

- Tsang Yi Ming

- Heat — 2:17.75 (→ did not advance, 32nd place)

- Wing Hon Ng

- Heat — 2:18.64 (→ did not advance, 33rd place)

Men's 400m Individual Medley

- Wing Hon Ng

- Heat — 4:58.98 (→ did not advance, 20th place)

Women's 100m Freestyle

- Yan Hong

- Heat — 1:00.45 (→ did not advance, 26th place)

- Kathy Wong

- Heat — 1:01.03 (→ did not advance, 32nd place)

- Fenella Ng

- Heat — 1:01.82 (→ did not advance, 34th place)

Women's 400m Freestyle

- Fenella Ng

- Heat — 4:43.41 (→ did not advance, 25th place)

Women's 200m Freestyle

- Fenella Ng

- Heat — 2:13.94 (→ did not advance, 30th place)

Women's 100m Backstroke

- Lotta Flink

- Heat — 1:09.70 (→ did not advance, 26th place)

- Kathy Wong

- Heat — 1:10.19 (→ did not advance, 27th place)

Women's 200m Backstroke

- Lotta Flink

- Heat — 2:29.00 (→ did not advance, 25th place)

- Kathy Wong

- Heat — DNS (→ did not advance, no ranking)

Women's 200m Individual Medley

- Lotta Flink

- Heat — 2:31.70 (→ did not advance, 25th place)

Women's 4 × 100 m Freestyle Relay

- Kathy Wong, Fenella Ng, Lotta Flink, and Lai Yee Chow

- Heat — 4:12.53 (→ did not advance)

Women's 4x100 Medley Relay

- Lotta Flink, Lai Yee Chow, Kathy Wong, and Fenella Ng

- Heat — 4:38.62 (→ did not advance)
