= Hong Kong at the 1988 Summer Olympics =

- IOC code: HKG
- NOC: Sports Federation and Olympic Committee of Hong Kong

in Seoul
- Competitors: 48 in 11 sports
- Flag bearer: Liu Fuk Man
- Officials: ?
- Medals: Gold 0 Silver 0 Bronze 0 Total 0

Summer Olympics appearances (overview)
- 1952; 1956; 1960; 1964; 1968; 1972; 1976; 1980; 1984; 1988; 1992; 1996; 2000; 2004; 2008; 2012; 2016; 2020; 2024; 2028

Hong Kong competed at the 1988 Summer Olympics in Seoul, South Korea. 48 competitors, 38 men and 10 women, took part in 49 events in 11 sports. The use in the traditional Korean Hangul alphabet which placed last before the host nation in the Parade of Nations.

== Competitors ==
The following is the list of number of competitors in the Games.

Sport	Men	Women	Total
Archery	2	1	3
Athletics	1	2	3
Canoeing	2	0	2
Cycling	5	0	5
Diving	2	0	2
Fencing	6	1	7
Judo	5	–	5
Sailing	4	0	2
Shooting	1	0	1
Swimming	6	4	10
Table tennis	4	2	6
Total	38	10	48

== Archery ==
In its second Olympic archery competition, Hong Kong was represented by two men and a woman. None advanced past the preliminary round.

Men

Athlete	Event	Ranking round		Eighth-final		Quarterfinal		Semifinal		Final	
Athlete	Event	Score	Rank	Score	Rank	Score	Rank	Score	Rank	Score	Rank
Ming Shan Fok	Individual	1108	77	Did not advance							
Chi Hung Lai	Individual	1079	79	Did not advance							

Women

Athlete	Event	Ranking round		Eighth-final		Quarterfinal		Semifinal		Final	
Athlete	Event	Score	Rank	Score	Rank	Score	Rank	Score	Rank	Score	Rank
Chan Siu Yuk	Individual	1098	60	Did not advance							

== Athletics ==
=== Men ===
Athlete	Events	Heat		Semifinal		Final	
Athlete	Events	Time	Position	Time	Position	Time	Position
Wing Kwong Leung	100 m	10.82	71	Did not advance			
Wing Kwong Leung	200 m	21.69	43	Did not advance			

=== Women ===
Athlete	Events	Heat		Semifinal		Final	
Athlete	Events	Time	Position	Time	Position	Time	Position
Ka Yi Ng	100 m	12.81	53	Did not advance			
Ka Yi Ng	200 m	25.35	49	Did not advance			

== Canoeing ==
Men

Athlete	Event	Heats		Repechage		Semifinals		Final	
Athlete	Event	Time	Rank	Time	Rank	Time	Rank	Time	Rank
Kwok Cheung Tang	K-1 500m	2:01.92	18	2:12.91	7	2:03.22	10	Did not advance	
Kwok Sun Luk	K-1 1000m	4:27.84	19	4:30.20	10	Did not advance			

== Cycling ==
Five male cyclists represented Hong Kong in 1988.

=== Road ===
Men

Athlete	Event	Time	Rank
Chow Tai Ming	Road race	4:32:56 (+0:34)	55
Hung Chung Yam	Road race	4:32:46 (+0:24)	12
Leung Hung Tak	Road race	4:32:56 (+0:34)	50
Hui Chak Bor; Hung Chung Yam; Leung Hung Tak; Yu Kau Wai	Team time trial	2:16:43.6 (+18:56)	25

== Diving ==
- Men's 3 metre springboard - Tang Kei Shan, Wong Kin Chung.

Men

Athlete	Event	Preliminary		Final	
Athlete	Event	Points	Rank	Points	Rank
Tang Kei Shan	3 m springboard	298.08	34	Did not advance	
Wong Kin Chung	3 m springboard	263.16	35	Did not advance	

== Fencing ==
Seven fencers, six men and one woman, represented Hong Kong in 1988.

Men's foil

- Choy Kam Shing
- Lee Chung Man
- Weng Tak Fung

Men's team foil

- Choy Kam Shing, Lee Chung Man, Tong King King, Weng Tak Fung

Men's épée

- Chan Kai Sang
- Tong King King
- Tang Wing Keung

Men's team épée

- Chan Kai Sang, Choy Kam Shing, Tang Wing Keung, Tong King King

Women's foil

- Yung Yim King

== Judo ==
- Men's 60 kg - Lee Kan
- Men's 65 kg - Au Woon Yiu
- Men's 71 kg - Chong Siao Ching
- Men's 78 kg - Lam Lap Hin
- Men's 86 kg - Ng Chiu Fan

== Sailing ==
- Men's Division II - Sam Wong
- Finn - Nicholas Bryan
- Flying Dutchman - Eric Lockeyear, Timothy Parsons

== Shooting ==
- Men's 50 metre pistol - Gilbert U

== Swimming ==
Men's 50 m Freestyle

- Khai Kam Li
  1. Heat – 24.30 (→ did not advance, 35th place)
- Michael Wright
  1. Heat – 24.47 (→ did not advance, 39th place)

Men's 100 m Freestyle

- Michael Wright
  1. Heat – 53.64 (→ did not advance, 49th place)
- Khai Kam Li
  1. Heat – 53.70 (→ did not advance, 50th place)

Men's 200 m Freestyle

- Arthur Li
  1. Heat – 1:58.10 (→ did not advance, 51st place)
- Yi Ming Tsang
  1. Heat – 2:01.02 (→ did not advance, 56th place)

Men's 400 m Freestyle

- Arthur Li
  1. Heat – 4:18.50 (→ did not advance, 45th place)

Men's 100 m Backstroke

- Hor Man Yip
  1. Heat – 1:01.91 (→ did not advance, 42nd place)
- Kam Sing Watt
  1. Heat – 1:08.03 (→ did not advance, 52nd place)
Men's 200 m Backstroke?
- Kam Sing Watt
  1. Heat – 2:30.78 (→ did not advance, 48th place)

Men's 100 m Butterfly

- Yi Ming Tsang
  1. Heat – 57.84 (→ did not advance, 39th place)

Men's 200 m Individual Medley

- Hor Man Yip
  1. Heat – 2:14.65 (→ did not advance, 40th place)
- Arthur Li
  1. Heat – 2:17.10 (→ did not advance, 48th place)

Men's 4 × 100 m Freestyle Relay

- Michael Wright, Khai Kam Li, Arthur Li, and Yi Ming Tsang
  1. Heat – 3:34.78 (→ did not advance, 16th place)

Men's 4 × 100 m Medley Relay

- Hor Man Yip, Kam Sing Watt, Yi Ming Tsang, and Michael Wright
  1. Heat – 4:05.28 (→ did not advance, 22nd place)

Women's 50 m Freestyle

- Cee Kay Hung
  1. Heat – 28.15 (→ did not advance, 35th place)
- Wing Sze Tsang
  1. Heat – 29.14 (→ did not advance, 45th place)

Women's 100 m Freestyle

- Cee Kay Hung
  1. Heat – 1:00.18 (→ did not advance, 42nd place)
- Fenella Ng
  1. Heat – 1:01.27 (→ did not advance, 45th place)

Women's 200 m Freestyle

- Fenella Ng
  1. Heat – 2:10.43 (→ did not advance, 36th place)
- Cee Kay Hung
  1. Heat – 2:13.61 (→ did not advance, 42nd place)

Women's 100 m Backstroke

- Wing Sze Tsang
  1. Heat – 1:10.50 (→ did not advance, 35th place)

Women's 100 m Butterfly

- Cee Kay Hung
  1. Heat – 1:06.94 (→ did not advance, 31st place)
- Annemarie Munk
  1. Heat – 1:08.35 (→ did not advance, 36th place)

Women's 200 m Individual Medley

- Annemarie Munk
  1. Heat – 2:34.32 (→ did not advance, 32nd place)

Women's 400 m Individual Medley

- Annemarie Munk
  1. Heat – 5:24.11 (→ did not advance, 29th place)

Women's 4 × 100 m Freestyle Relay

- Cee Kay Hung, Fenella Ng, Wing Sze Tsang, and Annemarie Munk
  1. Heat – 4:08.58 (→ did not advance, 14th place)

== Table Tennis ==
- Men's singles - Liu Fuk Man, Lo Chuen Tsung, Vong Lu Veng
- Women's singles - Mok Ka Sha, Hui So Hong
- Men's doubles - Lo Chuen Tsung, Vong Lu Veng
- Women's doubles - Mok Ka Sha, Hui So Hong
