= Cycling at the 1984 Summer Olympics – Men's individual road race =

Men's road race at the Games of the XXIII Olympiad
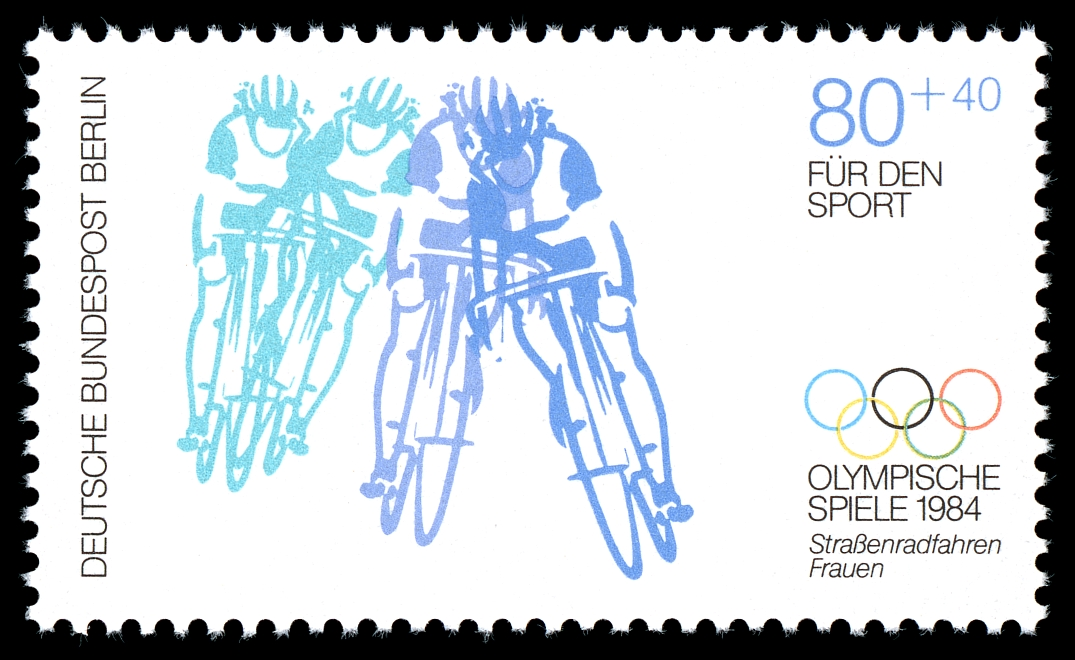
- German stamp commemorating Olympic cycling
- Venue: Streets of Mission Viejo
- Date: July 29
- Competitors: 135 from 43 nations
- Winning time: 4:59:57

Medalists
1st place, gold medalist(s)		Alexi Grewal; United States
2nd place, silver medalist(s)		Steve Bauer; Canada
3rd place, bronze medalist(s)		Dag Otto Lauritzen; Norway

The men's individual road race at the 1984 Summer Olympics in Los Angeles, California, was held on Sunday July 29, 1984. There were 135 participants from 43 nations in the race over 190.20 km, on a course in Mission Viejo, California. The maximum number of cyclists per nation was four. 55 cyclists finished. The event was won by Alexi Grewal of the United States, the nation's first medal in the men's individual road race. All three nations represented on the podium were there for the first time in the event; Canada with Steve Bauer's silver and Norway with Dag Otto Lauritzen's bronze joined the Americans.

== Background ==
This was the 12th appearance of the event, previously held in 1896 and then at every Summer Olympics since 1936. It replaced the individual time trial event that had been held from 1912 to 1932 (and which would be reintroduced alongside the road race in 1996). The late 1970s and early 1980s had seen a shift in power in the sport from Western Europe to the world's superpowers, with Eastern Europe (particularly Poland) more generally also rising. With the Soviet-led boycott, the host Americans were favored. Davis Phinney was considered "the best sprinter on the US team" but "not a great climber"; the hilly course did not favor him. Alexi Grewal nearly missed being able to compete, testing positive for the stimulant phenylethylamine and being suspended 10 days before the Games; he successfully appealed and was reinstated, on the ground that the test was not able to distinguish between phenylethylamine and albuterol (which Grewal took for asthma).

Bermuda, Belize, the Cayman Islands, Cyprus, Puerto Rico, Saudi Arabia, and Uganda each made their debut in the men's individual road race. Great Britain made its 12th appearance in the event, the only nation to have competed in each appearance to date.

== Competition format and course ==
The mass-start race was on a 190.2 kilometre course over 12 laps of a circuit in Mission Viejo. The course was hilly.

== Schedule ==
All times are Pacific Daylight Time (UTC-7)

Date	Time	Round
Sunday, 29 July 1984	13:00	Final

== Results ==
Grewal and Bauer separated from the lead pack on lap 11. They "never had a large lead" over the next pair, Lauritzen and Sæther, but were always clear of them. Grewal beat Bauer in the final sprint by "less than a wheel."

Rank	Cyclist	Nation	Time
1st place, gold medalist(s)	Alexi Grewal	United States	4:59:57
2nd place, silver medalist(s)	Steve Bauer	Canada	s.t.
3rd place, bronze medalist(s)	Dag Otto Lauritzen	Norway	+ 0' 21"
4	Morten Sæther	Norway	s.t.
5	Davis Phinney	United States	+ 1' 19"
6	Thurlow Rogers	United States	s.t.
7	Bojan Ropret	Yugoslavia	s.t.
8	Néstor Mora	Colombia	s.t.
9	Ron Kiefel	United States	1' 43"
10	Richard Trinkler	Switzerland	s.t.
11	Raúl Alcalá	Mexico	s.t.
12	Stefan Maurer	Switzerland	+ 3' 37"
13	Alberto Volpi	Italy	+ 4' 10"
14	Per Christiansson	Sweden	s.t.
15	Helmut Wechselberger	Austria	s.t.
16	Enrique Campos	Venezuela	s.t.
17	Luis Rosendo Ramos	Mexico	+ 6' 14"
18	Brian Fowler	New Zealand	+ 6' 48"
19	Martin Earley	Ireland	s.t.
20	Atle Kvålsvoll	Norway	s.t.
21	Fabio Parra	Colombia	s.t.
22	Thomas Freienstein	West Germany	+ 7' 51"
23	Francisco Antequera	Spain	+ 11' 30"
24	Per Pedersen	Denmark	+ 11' 46"
25	Kari Myyryläinen	Finland	s.t.
26	Lars Wahlqvist	Sweden	s.t.
27	Paul Kimmage	Ireland	s.t.
28	Daniel Amardeilh	France	s.t.
29	Philippe Bouvatier	France	s.t.
30	Kjell Nilsson	Sweden	s.t.
31	Harry Hannus	Finland	s.t.
32	Stefan Brykt	Sweden	s.t.
33	Louis Garneau	Canada	+ 15' 30"
34	Kurt Zellhofer	Austria	s.t.
35	Primož Čerin	Yugoslavia	s.t.
36	Achim Stadler	West Germany	s.t.
37	Stephen Cox	New Zealand	s.t.
38	Patrick Wackström	Finland	s.t.
39	Gary Thomson	Ireland	s.t.
40	Kim Eriksen	Denmark	s.t.
41	Werner Stauff	West Germany	+ 18' 04"
42	Jure Pavlič	Yugoslavia	s.t.
43	Séamus Downey	Ireland	s.t.
44	Jean-Paul van Poppel	Netherlands	+ 22' 20"
45	Matsuyoshi Takahashi	Japan	s.t.
46	Marko Cuderman	Yugoslavia	s.t.
47	Salvador Rios	Mexico	s.t.
48	Park Se-ryong	South Korea	s.t.
49	Johann Traxler	Austria	s.t.
50	Jeff Leslie	Australia	s.t.
51	Fernando Correa	Venezuela	s.t.
52	Carlos Jaramillo	Colombia	s.t.
53	Arthur Tenn	Jamaica	s.t.
54	Mustapha Najjari	Morocco	+ 22' 30"
55	Michael Lynch	Australia	+ 27' 05"
—	Luis Biera	Argentina	DNF
—	Gary Trowell	Australia	DNF
—	John Watters	Australia	DNF
—	Paul Popp	Austria	DNF
—	Carlo Bomans	Belgium	DNF
—	Ronny Van Sweevelt	Belgium	DNF
—	Frank Verleyen	Belgium	DNF
—	Joslyn Chavarria	Belize	DNF
—	Warren Coye	Belize	DNF
—	Lindford Gillitt	Belize	DNF
—	Wernell Reneau	Belize	DNF
—	John Ford	Bermuda	DNF
—	Earl Godfrey	Bermuda	DNF
—	Clyde Wilson	Bermuda	DNF
—	Alain Ayissi	Cameroon	DNF
—	Joseph Kono	Cameroon	DNF
—	Dieudonné Ntep	Cameroon	DNF
—	Thomas Siani	Cameroon	DNF
—	Pierre Harvey	Canada	DNF
—	Alain Masson	Canada	DNF
—	Craig Merren	Cayman Islands	DNF
—	David Dibben	Cayman Islands	DNF
—	Alfred Ebanks	Cayman Islands	DNF
—	Aldyn Wint	Cayman Islands	DNF
—	Manuel Aravena	Chile	DNF
—	Roberto Muñoz	Chile	DNF
—	Rogelio Arango	Colombia	DNF
—	Spyros Agrotis	Cyprus	DNF
—	Ole Byriel	Denmark	DNF
—	Søren Lilholt	Denmark	DNF
—	Harri Hedgren	Finland	DNF
—	Claude Carlin	France	DNF
—	Denis Pelizzari	France	DNF
—	Andreas Kappes	West Germany	DNF
—	Mark Bell	Great Britain	DNF
—	Neil Martin	Great Britain	DNF
—	Peter Sanders	Great Britain	DNF
—	Darryl Webster	Great Britain	DNF
—	Kanellos Kanellopoulos	Greece	DNF
—	Ilias Kelesidis	Greece	DNF
—	Randolph Toussaint	Guyana	DNF
—	Choy Yiu Chung	Hong Kong	DNF
—	Hung Chung Yam	Hong Kong	DNF
—	Law Siu On	Hong Kong	DNF
—	Leung Hung Tak	Hong Kong	DNF
—	Stefano Colagè	Italy	DNF
—	Roberto Pagnin	Italy	DNF
—	Renato Piccolo	Italy	DNF
—	Lorenzo Murdock	Jamaica	DNF
—	Kim Cheol-seok	South Korea	DNF
—	Lee Jin-ok	South Korea	DNF
—	Sin Dae-cheol	South Korea	DNF
—	Sirop Arslanian	Lebanon	DNF
—	Dyton Chimwaza	Malawi	DNF
—	Daniel Kaswanga	Malawi	DNF
—	George Nayeja	Malawi	DNF
—	Amadu Yusufu	Malawi	DNF
—	Jesús Rios	Mexico	DNF
—	Mustapha Afandi	Morocco	DNF
—	Brahim Ben Bouilla	Morocco	DNF
—	Ahmed Rhail	Morocco	DNF
—	Hans Daams	Netherlands	DNF
—	Twan Poels	Netherlands	DNF
—	Nico Verhoeven	Netherlands	DNF
—	Roger Sumich	New Zealand	DNF
—	Hans Petter Ødegård	Norway	DNF
—	Ramón Zavaleta	Peru	DNF
—	Ramón Rivera	Puerto Rico	DNF
—	Maurizio Casadei	San Marino	DNF
—	Hassan Al-Absi	Saudi Arabia	DNF
—	Mohammed Al-Shanqiti	Saudi Arabia	DNF
—	Abdullah Al-Shaye	Saudi Arabia	DNF
—	Ali Al-Ghazawi	Saudi Arabia	DNF
—	Manuel Jorge Domínguez	Spain	DNF
—	Miguel Indurain	Spain	DNF
—	José Salvador Sanchis	Spain	DNF
—	Heinz Imboden	Switzerland	DNF
—	Benno Wiss	Switzerland	DNF
—	Muharud Mukasa	Uganda	DNF
—	Ernest Buule	Uganda	DNF
