= Tsang (surname) =

Tsang is a Chinese surname, particularly used by people from Hong Kong. It is written as 曾. The surname 曾 may also be romanised as "Zeng" (pinyin, China) and "Tang" (Vietnam).

Notable people with the name include:

- Aaron Tsang, Canadian composer
- Andy Tsang (born 1958), Commissioner of the Hong Kong Police Force
- Angie Tsang (born 1980), Hong Kong wushu athlete and child actress
- Beryl Tsang, Canadian fibre artist
- Bion Tsang (born 1967), American cellist and professor
- Bowie Tsang (born 1973), Taiwanese Mandopop singer and actress
- Daniel C. Tsang, American activist and scholar
- Derek Tsang (born 1979), Hong Kong actor and film director
- Donald Tsang (born 1944), Chief Executive of the HKSAR from 2005 to 2012
- Edward Tsang, computer science professor at the University of Essex
- Eric Tsang (born 1953), Hong Kong actor, film director, and producer
- Henry Tsang (born 1943), Australian architect and politician
- Henry Tsang (artist) (born 1964), Hong Kong-Canadian contemporary artist
- Jasper Tsang (born 1947), 2nd President of the Legislative Council of Hong Kong
- Josephine Tsang Sau-ho, member of the Hong Kong District Council
- John Tsang (born 1951), Hong Kong civil servant and government official
- Kenneth Tsang (1934–2022), Hong Kong actor
- Leung Tsang (born 1950), Hong Kong-American electrical engineer and professor at University of Michigan
- Pansy Tsang (born 1969), Cantonese Chinese voice actress
- Stephen Tsang, Hong Kong-American ophthalmologist and geneticist
- Steve Tsang, Hong Kong-British political scientist and historian, director of the SOAS China Institute
- Tiki Tsang (born 1968), Australian actress and model
- Tosha Tsang (born 1970), Canadian rower
- Wu Tsang, filmmaker, artist and performer based in Los Angeles
- Tsang Chi Hau (born 1990), Hong Kong footballer
- Tsang Kam To (born 1989), Hong Kong footballer
- Tsang Kin Fong, Hong Kong footballer
- Tsang Kin-shing (born 1957), Hong Kong member of the Legislative Council
- Tsang Kin-Wah, Hong Kong visual artist
- Tsang Lap Chuen, Chinese philosopher in the analytic tradition
- Tsang Man Fai (born 1991), Hong Kong footballer
- Tsang Shu-ki (1950–2014), Hong Kong economist and social activist
- Tsang Siu-Fo (1923–2014), Chinese police officer of the Hong Kong police force
- Tsang Tak-sing (born 1949), Secretary for Home Affairs
- Tsang Tsou Choi (1921–2007), Hong Kong artist known for his calligraphy graffiti.
- Tsang Wai Chung, Hong Kong footballer
- Tsang Wing Sze (born 1972), Hong Kong swimmer
- Tsang Yam-pui (born 1946), Commissioner of Police of Hong Kong
- Tsang Yi Ming (born 1966), Hong Kong swimmer
- Wu Tsang (born 1981), American filmmaker

== See also ==
- Zang (surname)
- Zeng, surname
- Tang (surname)
- Tsang (disambiguation)
