= Cycling at the 1984 Summer Olympics – Men's team time trial =

Cycling - Men's team time trial at the Games of the XXIII Olympiad
- Venue: Artesia Freeway, Buena Park, California
- Dates: 5 August
- Competitors: 104 from 26 nations

Medalists
1st place, gold medalist(s)		Marcello Bartalini; Marco Giovannetti; Eros Poli; Claudio Vandelli; Italy
2nd place, silver medalist(s)		Alfred Achermann; Richard Trinkler; Laurent Vial; Benno Wiss; Switzerland
3rd place, bronze medalist(s)		Ron Kiefel; Clarence Knickman; Davis Phinney; Andrew Weaver; United States

The men's team time trial cycling event at the 1984 Summer Olympics took place on 5 August and was one of eight cycling events at the 1984 Olympics. The qualification and quarter finals were on 2 August and the semi-finals and finals on 3 August.

The Italian team recorded a dominant victory by winning by 4:10 over Switzerland. The Italian team was one of the first teams to use modern carbon-fiber disc wheels, which are now commonly used in time trials. Their time of 1h 58:28 was the fastest time ever recorded over 100 km in a team time trial, and would have been faster without a flat tire that cost them 20 seconds to change the wheel. The venue was a 15½-mile stretch of the Artesia Freeway.

== Results ==
Rank	Cyclists	Nation	Time
1st place, gold medalist(s)	Marcello Bartalini; Marco Giovannetti; Eros Poli; Claudio Vandelli	Italy	1:58:28
2nd place, silver medalist(s)	Alfred Achermann; Richard Trinkler; Laurent Vial; Benno Wiss	Switzerland	2:02:38
3rd place, bronze medalist(s)	Ron Kiefel; Clarence Knickman; Davis Phinney; Andrew Weaver	United States	2:02:57
4	Jos Alberts; Erik Breukink; Maarten Ducrot; Gert Jakobs	Netherlands	2:04:46
5	Bengt Asplund; Per Christiansson; Magnus Knutsson; Håkan Larsson	Sweden	2:05:07
6	Jean-François Bernard; Philippe Bouvatier; Thierry Marie; Denis Pelizzari	France	2:05:31
7	John Carlsen; Kim Eriksen; Lars Jensen; Søren Lilholt	Denmark	2:05:31
8	Steven Poulter; Keith Reynolds; Peter Sanders; Darryl Webster	Great Britain	2:05:51
9	Bruno Bulić; Primož Čerin; Janez Lampič; Bojan Ropret	Yugoslavia	2:05:55
10	Dag Hopen; Hans Petter Ødegård; Arnstein Raunehaug; Morten Sæther	Norway	2:07:05
11	Karl Krenauer; Johann Lienhart; Peter Muckenhuber; Helmut Wechselberger	Austria	2:08:08
12	Hartmut Bölts; Thomas Freienstein; Bernd Gröne; Michael Maue	West Germany	2:08:15
13	Harry Hannus; Kari Myyryläinen; Patrick Wackström; Sixten Wackström	Finland	2:08:17
14	Pierre Harvey; Alain Masson; Robert Pulfer; Martin Willock	Canada	2:09:44
15	Jeff Leslie; Michael Lynch; Gary Trowell; John Watters	Australia	2:10:20
16	Philip Cassidy; Martin Earley; Paul Kimmage; Gary Thomson	Ireland	2:10:52
17	Raúl Alcalá; Félipe Enríquez; Guillermo Gutiérrez; Cuauthémoc Muñoz	Mexico	2:13:16
18	Gilson Alvaristo; Jair Braga; Renan Ferraro; Marcos Mazzaron	Brazil	2:15:37
19	Choy Yiu Chung; Hung Chung Yam; Law Siu On; Leung Hung Tak	Hong Kong	2:17:24
20	Jo Geon-haeng; Jang Yun-ho; Kim Cheol-seok; Lee Jin-ok	South Korea	2:17:25
21	Han Shuxiang; Liu Fu; Wang Wanqiang; Zeng Bo	China	2:17:34
22	David Dibben; Alfred Ebanks; Craig Merren; Aldyn Wint	Cayman Islands	2:22:49
23	Alain Ayissi; Lucas Feutsa; Joseph Kono; Dieudonné Ntep	Cameroon	2:25:26
24	Hassan Al-Absi; Ahmed Al-Saleh; Mohammed Al-Shanqiti; Rajab Moqbil	Saudi Arabia	2:28:28
25	Joslyn Chavarria; Warren Coye; Kurt Cutkelvin; Merlyn Dawson	Belize	2:36:55
26	Dyton Chimwaza; Daniel Kaswanga; George Nayeja; Amadu Yusufu	Malawi	2:37:32
