= Yitzhak Hatuel =

Israeli fencer

Personal information
- Full name: יצחק חטואל
- Born: 15 September 1962 (age 63) Casablanca

Sport
- Country: Israel
- Sport: Fencing
- Event: Foil

Yitzhak (also "Itzhak") Hatuel (Hebrew: יצחק חטואל; born 15 September 1962) is an Israeli fencer. He competed in the individual foil event at the 1984 Summer Olympics at 21 years of age. In Round 1, he went 5-0, defeating Saul Mendoza of Bolivia, Jerome Ko of Hong Kong, Sergio Turiace of Argentina, Nobuyuki Azuma of Japan, and future gold medalist Philippe Omnès of France. In the quarter-finals, he went 2-2, defeating Bilal Rifaat of Egypt and Yu Yifeng of China. In the semi-finals, he went 3-2, defeating Bill Gosbee of Great Britain, Nobuyuki Azuma of Japan, and Mauro Numa of Italy -- who ended up winning the gold medal. In the finals, he went 0-2, losing to Numa and to Peter Lewison of the United States.

He is the brother of Israeli Olympic fencer Lydia Hatuel-Czuckermann (winner of 16 Israeli championships and participant in three Olympic Games), and uncle of Israeli Olympic fencer Delila Hatuel and Israeli fencer Maor Hatuel.
