= Shlomi Eyal =

Israeli fencer (1959–2019)

Shlomo "Shlomi" Eyal
Personal information
- Native name: שלמה "שלומי" אייל
- Born: 19 June 1959
- Died: 17 June 2019 (aged 59)

Sport
- Country: Israel
- Sport: Fencing

Shlomo "Shlomi" Eyal (Hebrew: שלמה "שלומי" אייל; 19 June 1959 – 17 June 2019) was an Israeli fencer. He competed in the individual foil event at the 1984 Summer Olympics at the age of 25. In Round 1 he went 3–1, defeating Julito Francis from the Virgin Islands, Haluk Yamaç of Turkey, and Stefano Cerioni of Italy. In the quarterfinals he went 2-2, defeating Edgardo Díaz of Puerto Rico and former silver medalist Pascal Jolyot of France. In the semifinals he was eliminated after going 1–4, with his sole victory coming against José Rafael Magallanes of Venezuela.
