= Hatuel =

Hatuel (Hebrew: חטואל) is a surname, mostly commonly found in Israel. Notable people with the surname include:

- Delila Hatuel (born 1980), Israeli Olympic foil fencer
- Tali Hatuel, Israeli killed with her four daughters in a shooting attack
- Yitzhak Hatuel (born 1962), Israeli Olympic foil fencer
- Lydia Hatuel-Czuckermann (born 1963), Israeli Olympic foil fencer
