= 1983 UCI Road World Championships =

- Venue: Altenrhein, Switzerland
- Dates: 31 August, 3-4 September 1983
- Coordinates: 47°28′N 9°34′E

The 1983 UCI Road World Championships took place on 31 August, 3 and 4 September 1983 in Altenrhein, Switzerland.

In the same period, the 1983 UCI Track Cycling World Championships were organized in Zurich.

== Results ==
Race:	Gold:	Time	Silver:	Time	Bronze :	Time
Men
Men's road race	Greg LeMond; United States	7.01'21"	Adri van der Poel; Netherlands	+ 1'11"	Stephen Roche; Ireland	+ 1'11"
Amateurs' road race	Uwe Raab; East Germany	-	Niki Rüttimann; Switzerland	-	Andrzej Serediuk; Poland	-
Team time trial	Soviet Union; Youri Kashirin; Sergej Novolokin; Oleg Tchugda; Alexandre Zinoviev	-	Switzerland; Daniel Heggli; Heinz Imboden; Othmar Haefliger; Benno Wiss	-	Norway; Terje Gjengaar; Dag Hopen; Hans Petter Ødegård; Tom Pedersen	-
Women
Women's road race	Marianne Berglund; Sweden	1.38'17"	Rebecca Twigg; United States	-	Maria Canins; Italy	-

== Medal table ==
Rank	Nation	Gold	Silver	Bronze	Total
1	United States (USA)	1	1	0	2
2	East Germany (GDR)	1	0	0	1
2	Soviet Union (URS)	1	0	0	1
2	Sweden (SWE)	1	0	0	1
5	Switzerland (SUI)	0	2	0	2
6	Netherlands (NED)	0	1	0	1
7	Ireland (IRL)	0	0	1	1
7	Italy (ITA)	0	0	1	1
7	Norway (NOR)	0	0	1	1
7	Poland (POL)	0	0	1	1
Totals (10 entries)		4	4	4	12
