= Marcello Bartalini =

Italian cyclist (born 1962)

Personal information
- Full name: Marcello Bartalini
- Born: 12 March 1962 (age 64) Empoli, Italy

Cycling career
- Sport: Cycling
- Discipline: Road
- Role: Rider

Professional team
Medal record
Representing Italy
Men's road cycling
Olympic Games
| Gold medal – first place | 1984 Los Angeles | Men's team time trial |

Marcello Bartalini (born 12 March 1962) is an Italian cyclist. He won the gold medal in Men's team time trial in the 1984 Summer Olympics along with teammates Marco Giovannetti, Eros Poli, and Claudio Vandelli. In 1985, along with Poli, Vandelli, and Massimo Podenzana, Bartinalini won bronze at the team time trial event at the UCI Road World Championships.
