= Hans Petter Ødegård =

Norwegian cyclist

Personal information
- Born: 16 June 1959 (age 67) Oslo, Norway

Cycling career
- Sport: Cycling

Hans Petter Ødegård (born 16 June 1959) is a Norwegian former cyclist. He competed in the individual road race and the team time trial events at the 1984 Summer Olympics.

== Career ==
Born in the same year as Dag Erik Pedersen, they competed in age-specific races. Ødegård rode for the club Lørenskog CK, until 1979 when he changed to SK Rye. Since the clubs could not agree on a transfer fee, the rules stipulated that Ødegård had to ride without shirt sponsors for the next twelve months.

Together with Geir Digerud, Morten Sæther and Jostein Wilmann, Ødegård won a bronze medal in the team time trial event at the 1979 UCI Road World Championships. Verdens Gang were delighted that Norway could foster not one, but four cyclists who were competitive on the highest international level. "It would be comparable to a Spaniard coming to Holmenkollen and achieving a third place among the world elite skiers", VG's journalist opined. "Norwegian sports has yet again had a bronze team", the newspaper wrote with reference to the Norwegian bronze medallists at the 1938 FIFA World Cup. Three weeks earlier, the same team had also won the Nordic Championships time trials.

The cycling team was now mentioned as one of Norway's main candidates to win a medal at the 1980 Summer Olympics. Norway ended up boycotting the Games and did not participate.

By the early 1980s, Ødegård was still not professional. He finished fourth in the road race at the 1982 Nordic Championships. and eleventh in the amateurs' road race at the 1982 UCI Road World Championships.

The next year, he won his second bronze medal in the team time trial event, this time at the 1983 UCI Road World Championships with teammates Terje Gjengaar, Dag Hopen and Tom Pedersen. The result was described as "one of the all-time bombshells", a "shock" and "unbelieveable". This time, a Norwegian team would be sent to the 1984 Summer Olympics in Los Angeles.

Ødegård finished 10th with the Norwegian time trial team at the 1984 Summer Olympics. Entering the individual road race, Ødegård did not finish that.
