= Zang =

Zang may refer to:

- Official abbreviation for Tibet Autonomous Region (藏)
- Tibetan people
- Zang (bell), Persian musical instrument
- Zang (surname) (臧), a Chinese surname
- Zang, Iran, a village in Kerman Province, Iran
- Persian form of Zanj

== See also ==
- Tsang (disambiguation)
- Zhang (disambiguation)
