= Lars Jensen =

Lars Jensen may refer to:

- Lars Jensen (footballer) (born 1975), Danish former football defender
- Lars Jensen (cyclist) (born 1964), Danish Olympic cyclist
- Lars Halvor Jensen (born 1973), Danish record producer and songwriter
- Lars Kraus Jensen (born 1944), Danish swimmer
- Lars Jensen (sailor), see Dragon (keelboat)
- Lars Jensen (volleyball player), played Volleyball at the 1996 Summer Paralympics
