= Tsang =

Tsang may refer to:

- Ü-Tsang (གཙང་), a traditional region of Tibet
- Tsang (surname)
- Zang (surname) (臧), romanized Tsang in Wade–Giles
- Zeng (曾), a Chinese surname, romanized Tsang in Cantonese

== See also ==
- Zang (disambiguation)
- Tsangpo (disambiguation)
