= Liu Fu =

Liu Fu may refer to:

- Liu Fu (prince) (劉輔; died 84), Eastern Han dynasty prince, son of Emperor Guangwu
- Liu Fu (Yuanying) (劉馥; died 208), style name Yuanying (元穎), Eastern Han dynasty politician
- Liu Fu (cyclist) (born 1957), Chinese Olympic cyclist
- Liu Bannong or Liu Fu (劉復, 1891–1934), Chinese linguist and poet
