= Håkan Larsson =

Håkan Larsson can refer to:

- Håkan Larsson (cyclist) (born 1958), Swedish cyclist
- Håkan Larsson (politician) (born 1950), Swedish politician
