= Guillermo Gutiérrez =

Guillermo Gutiérrez may refer to:

- Guillermo Gutiérrez (athlete) (born 1927), Venezuelan Olympic sprinter
- Guillermo Gutiérrez (cyclist) (born 1964), Mexican Olympic cyclist
