= Eros Poli =

Italian cyclist

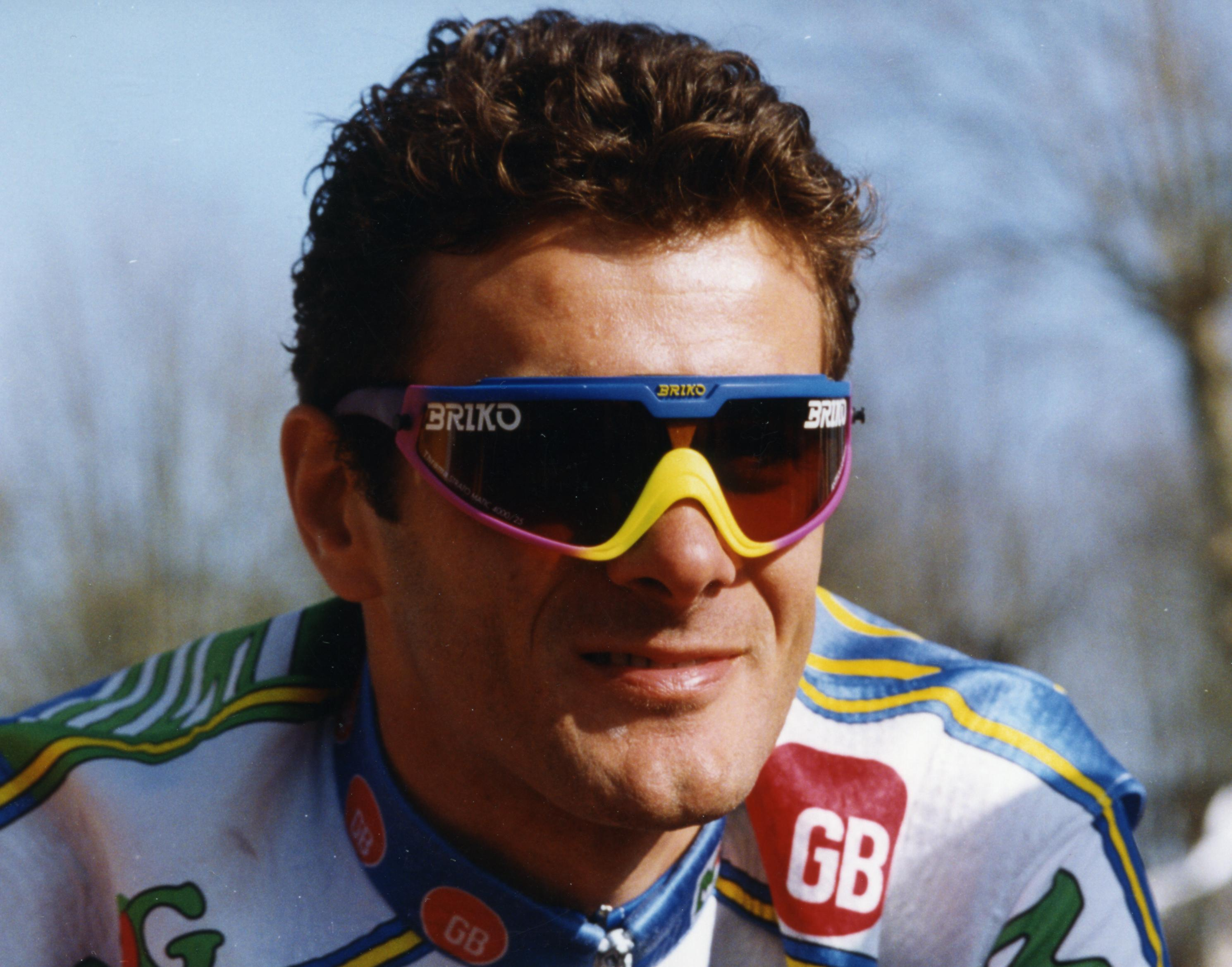
- Poli at the 1993 Paris–Nice

Personal information
- Full name: Eros Poli
- Born: 6 August 1963 (age 63) Isola della Scala, Italy
- Height: 1.94 m (6 ft 4 in)
- Weight: 85 kg (187 lb; 13 st 5 lb)

Cycling career
- Sport: Cycling
- Current team: Retired
- Discipline: Road
- Role: Rider

Professional teams
- 1991: Del Tongo–MG Boys
- 1992–1993: GB–MG Maglificio
- 1994–1995: GB–MG Maglificio
- 1996: Saeco–AS Juvenes San Marino
- 1997–1999: GAN
Medal record
Men's road bicycle racing
Representing Italy
Olympic Games
Gold medal – first place	1984 Los Angeles	Team Time Trial

Eros Poli (born 6 August 1963 in Isola della Scala, Veneto) is an Italian former professional racing cyclist of the 1990s, notably employed as Mario Cipollini's lead-out man in bunch sprints.

== Biography ==
Poli won the gold medal in the Team Time Trial at the 1984 Summer Olympics in Los Angeles, together with Claudio Vandelli, Marcello Bartalini and Marco Giovannetti. He also rode at the 1988 Summer Olympics.

Following Cipollini's abandonment of the 1994 Tour de France, Poli won the Montpellier to Carpentras stage (the 15th) which featured an ascent of Mont Ventoux. Poli calculated that if he broke away from the peloton by a sufficient margin on the flat run to the base of the climb of the Mont Ventoux, he would reach the summit in front in spite of his relatively poor climbing speed due to his heavy 197 cm frame. In the event, his gap of some 20 minutes was nearly closed, but he crested the climb in front and was not caught by the chasing pack on the run down to the finish of the stage in Carpentras. In that Tour, Poli won the Combativity award.

Poli rode mainly in the days before cycle helmets were compulsory in professional racing, and normally wore a casquette from which he cut out the top part, leaving just the elasticated headband and the peak to shade his eyes from the sun.

He was praised for his calculated cycling style and called the "bus driver", by cyclists such Chris Boardman, for his ability to lead the gruppetto through tough stages, ensuring they all reached the cut-off time. When asked by Cycle Sport magazine what he would like his epitaph to be, he said "Here lies Eros Poli, famous for being tall and coming last in the Giro d'Italia".

== Major results ==
1984
1st Olympic Games, Team Time Trial
1987
1st World Amateur Team Time Trial Championship
1992
1st Stage 7 Alpine Tour, Australia
1994
Tour de France

1st Stage 15
Combativity classification
Combativity award Stages 7 & 15

1997
4th Overall Étoile de Bessèges
1998
1st Dun Le Palestel Criterium
