= Ole Byriel =

Danish cyclist

Personal information
- Born: 3 January 1958 (age 68) Aarhus, Denmark

Cycling career
- Sport: Cycling

Ole Byriel (born 3 January 1958) is a Danish former cyclist. He competed in the individual road race event at the 1984 Summer Olympics.
