= Félipe Enríquez =

Mexican cyclist

Personal information
- Born: 1 February 1961 (age 65) Mexico City, Mexico

Cycling career
- Sport: Cycling

Félipe Enríquez Rojas (born 21 February 1961) is a Mexican former cyclist. He competed in the team time trial event at the 1984 Summer Olympics.
