= Jo Geon-haeng =

South Korean cyclist

Personal information
- Born: 7 February 1965 (age 61)

Cycling career
- Sport: Cycling

Jo Geon-haeng (born 7 February 1965) is a South Korean former cyclist. He competed in the team time trial event at the 1984 Summer Olympics.
