= Werner Stauff =

German cyclist (1960–2026)

Personal information
- Born: 16 February 1960 Cologne, West Germany
- Died: 27 June 2026 (aged 66)

Cycling career
- Sport: Cycling

Werner Stauff (16 February 1960 – 27 June 2026) was a German cyclist. He competed in the individual road race event at the 1984 Summer Olympics.
