= Marc Cerboni =

French fencer (1955–1990)

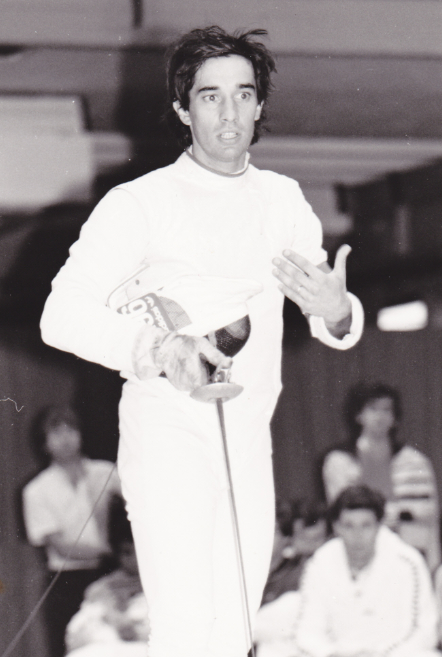

Personal information
- Born: 20 October 1955 Nice, France
- Died: 2 December 1990 (aged 35)

Sport
- Sport: Fencing
Medal record
Men's fencing
Representing France
Olympic Games
| Bronze medal – third place | 1984 Los Angeles | Foil, team |

Marc Cerboni (20 October 1955 – 2 December 1990) was a French fencer. He won a bronze medal in the team foil event at the 1984 Summer Olympics.
