= Zhang =

Zhang may refer to:

== Chinese culture ==
- Zhang (surname) (張/张), common Chinese surname
  - Zhang (surname 章), a rarer Chinese surname
- Zhang County (漳县), of Dingxi, Gansu
- Zhang River (漳河), a river flowing mainly in Henan
- Zhang (unit) (丈), a traditional Chinese unit of length equal to 10 chi (3–3.7 m)
- 璋, a type of shaped stone or jade object in ancient Chinese culture thought to hold great value and protective properties; see also Bi (jade) and Cong (jade)

== Astronomy ==
- Zhāng (张) or Extended Net, a Chinese constellation
- Zhang, the proper name of the star Upsilon¹ Hydrae

== See also ==
- Zang (disambiguation)
