= Kurt Cutkelvin =

Belizean cyclist

Personal information
- Born: 2 January 1964 (age 62)

Cycling career
- Sport: Cycling

Kurt D. Cutkelvin (born 2 January 1964) is a Belizean former cyclist. He competed in the team time trial event at the 1984 Summer Olympics.
