= Rajab Moqbil =

Saudi Arabian cyclist (born 2959)

Personal information
- Born: 1959 (age 66–67)

Cycling career
- Sport: Cycling

Rajab Moqbil (Arabic: رجب مقبل; born 1959) is a Saudi Arabian former cyclist. He competed in the team time trial event at the 1984 Summer Olympics.
