= Séamus Downey =

Cyclist from Northern Ireland

Personal information
- Born: 13 June 1960 (age 66) Banbridge, Northern Ireland

Cycling career
- Sport: Cycling
- Discipline: Road

Séamus Downey (born 13 June 1960) is a former cyclist from Banbridge, County Down, Northern Ireland. He competed in the individual road race event at the 1984 Summer Olympics for Ireland and for Northern Ireland in the Commonwealth Games.

== Career ==
Downey started cycling for Banbridge Cycling Club as his uncle was also a member. He was selected to represent Northern Ireland at the 1982 Commonwealth Games in Brisbane, Australia in the road cycling event, despite never having left the island of Ireland before.

Following the Commonwealth Games, he aimed to compete at the Olympics. He qualified for the 1984 Summer Olympics in Los Angeles, United States under the coaching of Pat McQuaid whom had arranged a sponsorship with Raleigh Bicycle Company so that the Irish athletes always rode their bikes. Downey was the only amateur member of the Irish Olympic cycling team and had to take time out from his teaching job at St Malachy's High School in Castlewellan in order to compete in qualification events. Downey finished 43rd in the Road Race at the Olympics. Opting not to turn professional, Downey competed for Northern Ireland in the 1986 Commonwealth Games road race in Edinburgh, Scotland.

== Personal life ==
After retiring, Downey moved to Dromore, County Down to open a bike shop. Downey has two sons, Mark and Sean, both of whom became competitive cyclists with Sean winning a bronze medal for Northern Ireland in the team pursuit at the 2010 Commonwealth Games in Delhi, India and Mark winning a bronze at the World Championships.
