= Tang (surname) =

Tang is a pinyin romanization of various Chinese surnames.

== Background ==
Chinese surnames commonly romanized as "Tang" include Táng (唐) and Tāng (湯/汤). Tang is also Cantonese Romanization of Surname (鄧/邓) (Mandarin Pinyin: Dèng; Jyutping: Dang6; Yale: Dahng) and Teng (滕, Pinyin: Téng), especially for persons of Hong Kong origin, based on Cantonese pronunciation. Tang can also be used to romanize the surname Zeng/Tsang (曾, Pinyin: Zēng), based on Vietnamese pronunciation.

In 2019, Táng was the 25th most common surname in Mainland China. According to a 2013 study, it was the 25th most-common name, shared by 9,170,000 people or 0.690% of the population, with the province with the most being Hunan.

== People ==
Notable people with their surname commonly romanized as Tang include:

=== Western name order ===
People in this section have Wikipedia articles with their given name first.

- Andrew Tang (born 1999), American chess grandmaster
- Audrey Tang (born 1981), Taiwanese free-software programmer
- Chen Tang, Japanese-born Chinese-American actor
- Ching Wan Tang (born 1947), Hong Kong–American physical chemist
- Chris Tang (born 1965), Hong Kong law enforcement administrator
- Cyndi Tang-Loveland, American animation director
- Dominic Tang (1908–1995), Chinese Jesuit priest
- Donald Tang, Shanghai-born American businessperson
- Ewin Tang (born 2000), computer scientist at the University of Washington
- Felicia Tang (1977–2009), stage name of an American actress and model
- Gordon Tang, also known as Yigang Tang, Singaporean billionaire businessperson
- Henry Tang (born 1952), Hong Kong politician
- Joyce Tang (born 1976), Hong Kong-born television actress
- Kaiji Tang (born 1984), Chinese voice actor working primarily in Los Angeles
- Melissa Tang (born 1985), American actress
- Paul Tang (civil servant) (born 1956), Hong Kong civil servant
- Paul Tang (politician) (born 1967), Dutch politician
- Roy Tang (born 1963), Hong Kong government official
- Sheren Tang (born 1966), Hong Kong actress
- Stephy Tang (born 1983), Hong Kong singer and actress
- Tiffany Tang (born 1983), Chinese actress and singer

=== Eastern name order ===
People in this section have Wikipedia articles with their family name first.

- Tang Aijun (born 1950), Chinese politician from Inner Mongolia
- Tang Baiqiao (born 1967), Chinese political dissident
- Tang Chun-i (1909–1978), Chinese philosopher
- Tang Dengjie (born 1964), Chinese politician and business executive
- Tang Erho (1878–1940), Chinese medical doctor and politician
- Tang Fei (born 1932), Republic of China air force general
- Tang Guangfu (born 1966), Chinese engineer
- Tang Hon Sing (born 1977), Hong Kong former sprinter
- Tang I-Fang (1924–2013), China-born Singaporean public servant
- Tang Jiali (footballer) (born 1995), Chinese professional footballer
- Tang Jiali (model) (born 1976), Chinese dancer and model
- Tang Jinhua (born 1992), Chinese badminton player
- Tang Jun-sang, South Korean-born Malaysian actor
- Tang Kai (born 1996), Chinese mixed martial artist
- Tang Lin (born 1976), Chinese judoka
- Tang Min (born 1971), Chinese-born tennis player
- Tang Na (1914–1988), Chinese writer
- Tang Renjian (born 1962), Chinese politician
- Tang Shaoyi (1862–1938), Chinese statesman
- Tang Tian (footballer) (born 1977), Chinese footballer and coach
- Tang Tian (songwriter) (born 1983), Chinese songwriter
- Tang Wei (born 1979), Chinese actress
- Tang Xin (born 2001), Chinese cyclist
- Tang Xiyang (1930–2022), Chinese environmentalist
- Tang Yi (born 1993), Chinese competitive swimmer
- Tang Yijie (1927–2014), Chinese scholar and professor
- Tang Yijun (born 1961), Chinese politician
- Tang Yin (1470–1524), Chinese painter, calligrapher, and poet
- Tang Yuanting (born 1994), Chinese badminton player
- Tang Zi (fl. 225–262), military general in China

== See also ==
- Tsang (surname)
