= Law Siu On =

Hong Kong cyclist

Personal information
- Native name
- Traditional Chinese: 羅兆安
- Simplified Chinese: 罗兆安
Transcriptions
Standard Mandarin
- Hanyu Pinyin: Luó Zhào ān
- Wade–Giles: Lo Chao‑an
Yue: Cantonese
- Jyutping: Lo4 Siu6 On1
- Nationality: Hong Konger
- Born: 8 May 1964 (age 62)

Sport
- Sport: Cycling

Law Siu On (traditional Chinese: 羅兆安; simplified Chinese: 罗兆安; born 8 May 1964) is a Hong Kong former cyclist. He competed in the individual road race and the team time trial events at the 1984 Summer Olympics.

== Biography ==
Law was a member of the Billy team and joined the Bic team shortly following the Billy team's ceasing of operations in 1981. Law participated in the Sai Kung's Sports Festival road race in 1983. He received first place in the 63 km (39 mi) event with a time of 1 hour, 59 minutes and 48.9 seconds. Law competed at the Marlboro Super Series in Tai Po in April 1984. With a time of 59 minutes and 15 seconds, he received first place in the 45 km (28 mi) race and defeated Choy Yiu Chung, who placed second. Law participated in the 1984 Summer Olympics. According to the South China Morning Post sports journalist Colin Ruffell, Law was the without question, the lowest-performing athlete in the group of four who competed at the team event.

At a Victoria Park winter cycling event in 1985, Law placed first. He competed in the 1986 Commonwealth Games, where he and his team did not have a strong showing. After a dispute with Hong Kong cycling national coach Vincent Tse in 1986, Law was removed from the team by the Hongkong Cycling Association (HKCA) before the 1986 Asian Games. He was instructed to avoid the Jubilee Sports Centre's practice track. Law competed at the Jubilee Sports Centre against a Shanghai team in April 1987. He received first place in both the individual sprint and the individual 1 km (0.62 mi) time trial with a time of 1 minute 19.06 seconds in the latter. He was the sole Hong Konger to qualify for the track cycling event at the 1987 Asian Cycling Championships.
