= Tsangpo =

Tsangpo (Tibetan: གཙང་པོ, Wylie: gtsang po, THL: tsang po) is the Tibetan word for river. It can often be found as a suffix attached to names of rivers originating or sometimes flowing through the Tsang province of Tibet, including:

- Kyirong Tsangpo, in its lower reaches known as Trishuli River
- Matsang Tsangpo, the formal Tibetan name for Bhote Koshi, a tributary of Sun Kosi.
- Raga Tsangpo
- Rongshar Tsangpo, a tributary of Tamakoshi River
- Yarlung Tsangpo, the upper Brahmaputra River in Tibet

== See also ==
- Tsang (disambiguation)
