= Fernando Correa (cyclist) =

Venezuelan cyclist

Personal information
- Born: 10 February 1961 (age 65)

Cycling career
- Sport: Cycling

Fernando Correa (born 10 February 1961) is a Venezuelan former cyclist. He competed in the individual road race event at the 1984 Summer Olympics.
