= Arnstein Raunehaug =

Norwegian cyclist

Personal information
- Born: 17 December 1960 (age 65) Bergen, Norway

Cycling career
- Sport: Cycling

Arnstein Raunehaug (born 17 December 1960) is a Norwegian former cyclist. He competed in the team time trial event at the 1984 Summer Olympics.
