= Zeng Bo =

Chinese cyclist

Personal information
- Born: 12 September 1965 (age 61)

Cycling career
- Sport: Cycling

Zeng Bo (born 12 September 1965) is a Chinese former cyclist. He competed in the team time trial event at the 1984 Summer Olympics.
