= Wernell Reneau =

Belizean cyclist

Personal information
- Born: 10 April 1965 (age 61)

Cycling career
- Sport: Cycling

Wernell Reneau (born 10 April 1965) is a Belizean former cyclist. He competed in the individual road race event at the 1984 Summer Olympics.
