= Jair Braga =

Brazilian cyclist

Personal information
- Born: 3 June 1954 Joaçaba, Santa Catarina, Brazil
- Died: 5 March 2004 (aged 49) Curitiba, Paraná, Brazil

Cycling career
- Sport: Cycling
- Discipline: Road

Jair Braga (3 June 1954 – 5 March 2004) was a Brazilian cyclist. He competed in the team time trial event at the 1984 Summer Olympics.
