= Stefan Maurer =

Swiss cyclist

Personal information
- Born: 6 October 1960 Schaffhausen, Switzerland
- Died: 28 January 1994 (aged 33)

Cycling career
- Sport: Cycling

Stefan Maurer (6 October 1960 – 28 January 1994) was a Swiss cyclist. He competed in the individual road race event at the 1984 Summer Olympics. He drowned in a diving accident in Thailand in 1994.
