= Mustapha Najjari =

Moroccan cyclist

Personal information
- Born: 1951 (age 74–75) Casablanca, Morocco

Cycling career
- Sport: Cycling

Mustapha Najjari (born 1951) is a Moroccan former cyclist. He competed in the individual road race event at the 1984 Summer Olympics.
