= Cuauthémoc Muñoz =

Mexican cyclist

Personal information
- Born: 18 May 1961 (age 65)

Cycling career
- Sport: Cycling

Cuauthémoc Muñoz (born 18 May 1961) is a Mexican former cyclist. He competed in the team time trial event at the 1984 Summer Olympics.
