= Earl Godfrey =

Bermudian cyclist

Personal information
- Born: 20 August 1961 (age 65)

Cycling career
- Sport: Cycling

Earl Godfrey (born 20 August 1961) is a Bermudian former cyclist. He competed in the individual road race event at the 1984 Summer Olympics.
