= Michael Maue =

German cyclist

Personal information
- Born: 18 May 1960 (age 66) Kaiserslautern, West Germany

Cycling career
- Sport: Cycling

Michael Maue (born 18 May 1960) is a German former cyclist. He competed in the team time trial event at the 1984 Summer Olympics.
