= Laurent Vial =

Swiss cyclist

Personal information
- Born: 9 September 1959 (age 67) Corcelles, Canton of Bern, Switzerland

Cycling career
- Sport: Cycling
Medal record
Men's cycling
Representing Switzerland
Olympic Games
Silver medal – second place	1984 Los Angeles	Team time trial

Laurent Vial (born 9 September 1959) is a retired track cyclist and road bicycle racer from Switzerland, who was a professional road rider in 1985. He represented his native country at the 1984 Summer Olympics in Los Angeles, California, where he won the silver medal in the men's team time trial, alongside Alfred Achermann, Richard Trinkler and Benno Wiss.
