= Wang Wanqiang =

Chinese cyclist

Personal information
- Born: 15 November 1964 (age 61)

Cycling career
- Sport: Cycling

Wang Wanqiang (born 15 November 1964) is a Chinese former cyclist. He competed in the team time trial event at the 1984 Summer Olympics.
