= Salvador Rios =

Mexican cyclist

Personal information
- Born: 28 January 1963 (age 63)

Cycling career
- Sport: Cycling

Salvador Rios (born 28 January 1963) is a Mexican former cyclist. He competed in the individual road race event at the 1984 Summer Olympics.
