= Ahmed Al-Saleh =

Saudi Arabian cyclist (born 1966)

Personal information
- Born: 1966 (age 59–60)

Cycling career
- Sport: Cycling

Ahmed Al-Saleh (Arabic: أحمد الصالح; born 1966) is a Saudi Arabian former cyclist. He competed in the team time trial event at the 1984 Summer Olympics.
