= Robert Pulfer =

Canadian cyclist

Personal information
- Born: 2 October 1967 (age 59) Vernon, British Columbia, Canada

Cycling career
- Sport: Cycling

Robert Pulfer (born 2 October 1967) is a Canadian former cyclist. He competed in the team time trial event at the 1984 Summer Olympics.
