= Alfred Achermann =

Swiss cyclist

Personal information
- Full name: Alfred Achermann
- Born: 17 July 1959 (age 67) Römerswil, Switzerland

Cycling career
- Sport: Cycling
- Disciplines: Track & Road
- Role: Rider
Medal record
Olympic Games
Representing Switzerland
Silver medal – second place	1984 LA	Team Time Trial

Alfred Achermann (born 17 July 1959 in Römerswil) is a retired track cyclist and road bicycle racer from Switzerland, who was a professional rider from 1984 to 1991. He represented his native country at the 1984 Summer Olympics in Los Angeles, California, where he won the silver medal in the men's team time trial, alongside Richard Trinkler, Laurent Vial and Benno Wiss.
