= Marko Cuderman =

Yugoslav cyclist (born 1960)

Personal information
- Born: 11 August 1960 (age 66) Kranj, Yugoslavia

Cycling career
- Sport: Cycling

Marko Cuderman (born 11 August 1960) is a Yugoslav former cyclist. He competed in the individual road race event at the 1984 Summer Olympics.
