= Marios Kassianidis =

Cypriot long-distance runner (born 1954)

Personal information
- Nationality: Cypriot
- Born: 16 September 1954 (age 72)

Sport
- Sport: Long-distance running
- Event: Marathon

Marios Kassianidis (Greek: Μάριος Κασσιανίδης; born 16 September 1954) is a Greek-Cypriot long-distance runner. He competed in the marathon at the 1984 Summer Olympics.
