= Steven Poulter =

British cyclist

Personal information
- Born: 3 December 1954 (age 71) Ormskirk, Lancashire, England

Cycling career
- Sport: Cycling

Steven Poulter (born 3 December 1954) is a British former cyclist. He competed in the team time trial event at the 1984 Summer Olympics.
