= Lucas Feutsa =

Cameroonian cyclist

Personal information
- Full name: Lucas Feutsa

Cycling career
- Sport: Cycling

Lucas Feutsa is a Cameroonian former cyclist. He competed in the team time trial event at the 1984 Summer Olympics.
