= Jos Alberts =

Dutch cyclist

Personal information
- Full name: Johan Arend Alberts
- Born: 24 January 1960 Zutphen, Netherlands

Cycling career
- Sport: Cycling

Johan Arend "Jos" Alberts (born 24 January 1960) is a Dutch cyclist. He competed in the men's team time trial event at the 1984 Summer Olympics, finishing in fourth place.

== See also ==
- List of Dutch Olympic cyclists
