= Li Khai-kam =

Hong Kong swimmer (born 1966)

Johnny Li Khai-kam
- Born: 16 July 1966 (age 60)
- Education: University of California, Berkeley
- Occupation: Swimmer
- Known for: Representing Hong Kong at the 1984 and 1988 Olympics
- Children: Jane Li (李澄); Tiffany Li (李怡)

Chinese name
- Traditional Chinese: 李啟淦
- Simplified Chinese: 李启淦
- Hanyu Pinyin: Lĭ Qĭgàn
- Yale Romanization: Leih Kái-gam
- Jyutping: Lei^{5} Kai^{2}gam^{3}

Johnny Li Khai-kam (born 16 July 1966 in Hong Kong) is a two-time Hong Kong Olympic swimmer in the 1984 and 1988 Summer Olympics. In 1981, he set the Hong Kong age group record for 14-year-olds in the 100 metres freestyle at British Swimming's Age Group Championships, a record which stood until 2005 when it was broken by Geoffrey Cheah.

Li also had a minor career as a television actor with TVB. In 2013 he appeared in three episodes of Ghetto Justice II, and later in one episode of Triumph in the Skies II in the role of the swimming coach of Him Law's character.

== Personal life ==
Li graduated from Wah Yan College in Wan Chai in 1983, and went on to study at UC Berkeley. While a student there, he married Commercial Radio Hong Kong DJ Sandy Lamb in 1987 after learning that she was pregnant with his first daughter, whom they named Jane. Lamb moved to California to be with Li. The couple went on to have another daughter Tiffany, but divorced in 1992.
