= Spyros Agrotis =

Cypriot cyclist (born 1961)

Personal information
- Born: 5 November 1961 (age 64) Nicosia, Cyprus
- Height: 1.70 m (5 ft 7 in)
- Weight: 59 kg (130 lb)

Cycling career
- Sport: Cycling
- Current team: Retired
- Discipline: Road
- Role: Rider

Spyros Agrotis (Greek: Σπύρος Αγρότης; born 5 November 1961) is a Cypriot former cyclist. He competed in the individual road race event at the 1984 Summer Olympics.
