= Achim Stadler =

German cyclist (1961–2022)

Personal information
- Born: 27 August 1961 Speyer, Rhineland-Palatinate, West Germany
- Died: 6 July 2022 (aged 60)

Cycling career
- Sport: Cycling

Achim Stadler (27 August 1961 – 6 July 2022) was a German cyclist. He competed in the individual road race event at the 1984 Summer Olympics.
