= Angelo Scuri =

Italian fencer (born 1959)

Personal information
- Born: 24 December 1959 (age 66) Florence, Italy

Sport
- Sport: Fencing
Medal record
Men's fencing
Representing Italy
Olympic Games
Gold medal – first place	1984 Los Angeles	Foil, team

Angelo Scuri (born 24 December 1959) is an Italian fencer. He won a gold medal in the team foil event at the 1984 Summer Olympics.
