= Ilias Kelesidis =

Greek cyclist (1953–2007)

Personal information
- Born: 20 June 1953 Brno, Czechoslovakia
- Died: 30 March 2007 (aged 53) Athens, Greece

Cycling career
- Sport: Cycling

Ilias Kelesidis (20 June 1953 – 30 March 2007) was a Greek cyclist. He competed in the individual road race event at the 1984 Summer Olympics.
