= Kjell Nilsson (cyclist) =

Swedish cyclist (born 1962)

Personal information
- Born: 4 April 1962 (age 64) Örebro, Sweden

Cycling career
- Sport: Cycling

Kjell Nilsson (born 4 April 1962) is a Swedish former cyclist. He competed in the individual road race event at the 1984 Summer Olympics.
