= Randolph Toussaint =

Guyanese cyclist

Personal information
- Born: 12 August 1955 (age 71)

Cycling career
- Sport: Cycling

Randolph Toussaint (born 12 August 1955) is a Guyanese former cyclist. He competed in the individual road race event at the 1984 Summer Olympics. He was a national champion and after his competitive career, he founded a cycling club in Guyana.
