= Hidehachi Koyasu =

Japanese fencer

Personal information
- Born: 2 January 1960 (age 66)

Sport
- Sport: Fencing

Hidehachi Koyasu (子安 英八, Koyasu Hidehachi) (born 2 January 1960) is a Japanese fencer. He competed in the team foil event at the 1984 Summer Olympics.
