= Yip Hor Man =

Hong Kong swimmer

Personal information
- Born: 5 May 1970 (age 56)

Sport
- Sport: Swimming

Yip Hor Man (born 5 May 1970) is a Hong Kong backstroke and medley swimmer. He competed in three events at the 1988 Summer Olympics.
