= Delila Hatuel =

Israeli fencer (born 1980)

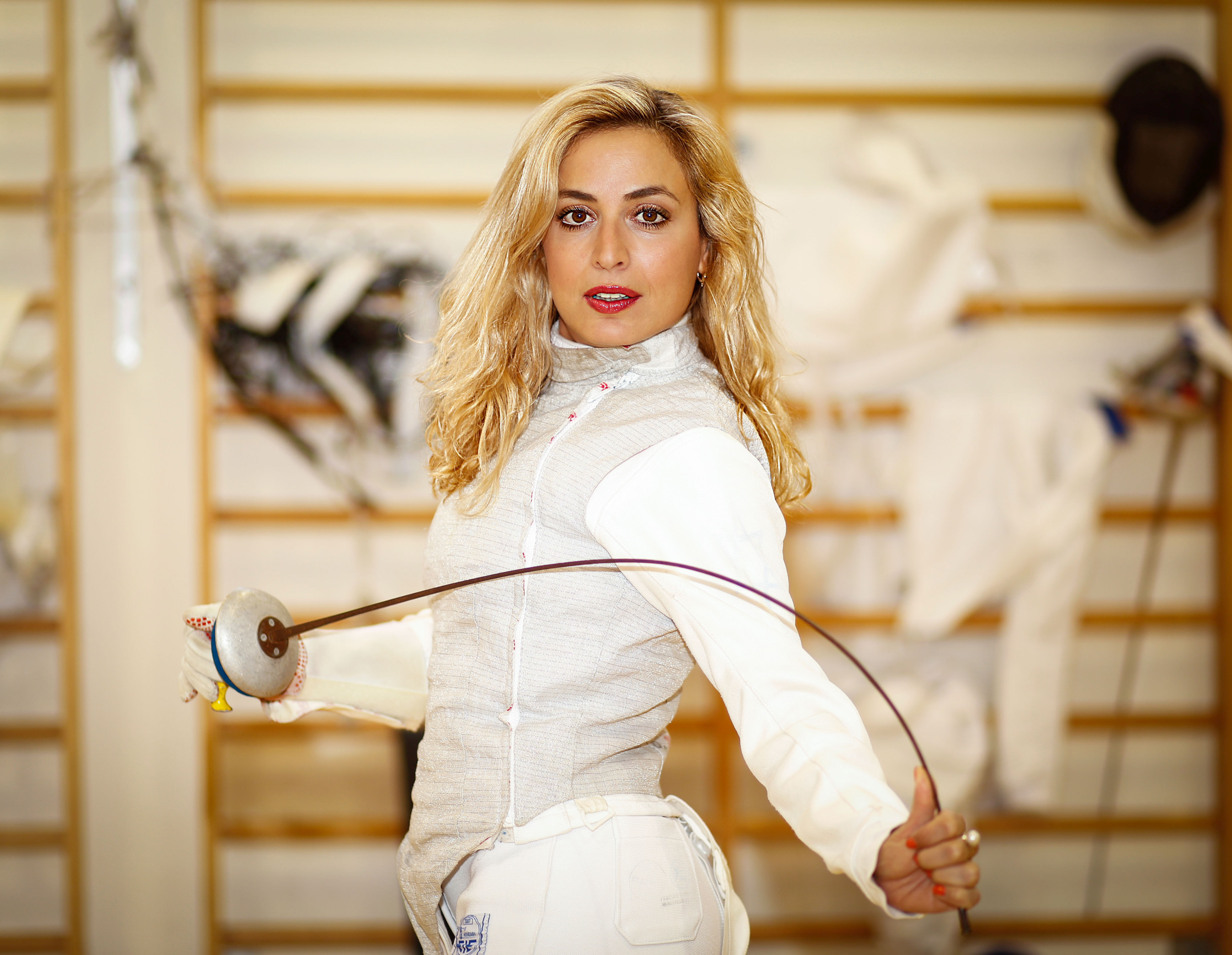

Personal information
- Native name: דלילה חטואל
- Born: 15 November 1980 (age 45) Acre, Israel
- Height: 1.60 m (5 ft 3 in)
- Weight: 51 kg (112 lb)

Sport
- Country: Israel
- Sport: Fencing
- Event: Foil
- Club: Olympic Fencing Center Akko
- Coached by: Haim Hatuel

Achievements and titles
- Highest world ranking: 9th (April 2008)

Delila Hatuel (Hebrew: דלילה חטואל; born November 15, 1980) is an Israeli Olympic foil fencer. She represented Israel at the 2008 Summer Olympics, and was at one point ranked ninth in the world.

== Biography ==
Hatuel was born in Acre, Israel, in 1980. Her brother Maor is also a fencer, as is her aunt Lydia Hatuel-Czuckermann and her uncle Yitzhak Hatuel. Hatuel, alongside her father and aunt, trains children in fencing at Acre's Olympic Fencing Center.

== Career ==
Hatuel finished ninth in the team foil 1997 World Fencing Championships in Cape Town, South Africa, and eighth in the team foil 1998 European Fencing Championships in Plovdiv, Bulgaria.

In July 2007, Hatuel finished sixth in individual foil at the European Fencing Championships, in Ghent, Belgium. Throughout 2008, she finished in the top 10 in the Fencing World Cup circuit, and was ranked in the top 16 in the world.

In April 2008, she was ranked 9th in the world in women's foil. In July 2008, at the 2008 European Fencing Championships in Kyiv, Ukraine, she defeated Olympic foil champion Valentina Vezzali, but injured her knee at the end of the bout. She finished seventh in individual foil in the tournament.

Her injury included a torn anterior cruciate ligament, which had to be surgically repaired. She underwent treatment in a hyperbaric oxygen chamber at Assaf Harofeh Medical Center in Beer Yaakov, Israel, so that she would be well enough to compete at the 2008 Summer Olympics. Exposure to oxygen under high pressure speeds up the body's natural healing process.

Hatuel, then ranked 11th in the world, represented Israel at the 2008 Summer Olympics in Beijing, China, in foil fencing, at 27 years of age. She came in 19th, losing 10–9 to reigning world title holder Viktoriya Nikishina of Russia, who was part of the gold medal-winning Russian team. Hatuel tied the match with less than a minute remaining, and was defeated in overtime. Hatuel later said: "I'm sad, but this loss has nothing to do with my injury. I lost in a tight match." However, a reporter for Haaretz said "it seems that Hatuel's knee injury was agonizing". Hatuel said she would be undergoing further surgery and hoped to participate at the 2012 Summer Olympics in London.

In 2009, Hatuel won the gold medal at the 2009 Maccabiah Games in women's foil.

In 2014 she won the European Games Baku Senior Women's Foil Qualification Tournament in Budapest, Hungary.

She took 24th at the 2015 European Senior Women Foil Championships in Montreux, Switzerland, and 31st at the 2016 European Senior Women Foil Championships in Torun, Poland.`

Hatuel was ranked 9th in the world in 2016, and qualified to fence in the 2016 Summer Olympics in Rio in Women's foil by virtue of her performance at the Championnats De Qualification Europeans on April 16, 2016, in Prague, Czech Republic. But the Israel Olympic Committee applied higher standards than did the International Olympic Committee—whose standards she met, and Hatuel was not allowed to fence at the 2016 Summer Olympics.

== See also ==
- List of select Jewish fencers
  - List of Israeli athletes § Fencing
- Sports in Israel
