= Annemarie Munk =

Hong Kong swimmer (born 1974)

Personal information
- Born: 25 March 1974 (age 52)

Sport
- Sport: Swimming
- Club: Hong Kong Country Club, Harry Wright
- College team: USC

Annemarie Munk (born 25 March 1974) is a Hong Kong swimmer. She competed in four events at the 1988 Summer Olympics.

She was educated at Island School and Deerfield Academy, before enrolling at the University of Southern California.

Munk is the cofounder of Swim Lab Asia, a triathlon and open water swimming coaching business, and as of 2018 was the director and head coach. Munk is also a board member and the director of programs for Splash Foundation, a charity swim school for the underprivileged and under-resourced community in Hong Kong.
