= Ng Wing Hon =

Hong Kong swimmer (born 1967)

Personal information
- Born: 17 June 1967 (age 59)

Sport
- Sport: Swimming

Ng Wing Hon (born 17 June 1967) is a Hong Kong freestyle and medley swimmer. He competed in three events at the 1984 Summer Olympics.
