= Stephen Tsang =

American ophthalmologist and geneticist

Stephen H. Tsang
- 曾慶霖
- Born: British Hong Kong
- Education: Johns Hopkins University (B.S.), Columbia College of Physicians and Surgeons (M.D.–Ph.D.)
- Scientific career
- Fields: ophthalmology, genetics
- Workplaces: Columbia University Irving Medical Center

Stephen H. Tsang (Chinese: 曾慶霖; pinyin: Zēng Qìnglín) is an American ophthalmologist and geneticist. He is currently a Professor of Ophthalmology, and Pathology and Cell Biology at Columbia University Irving Medical Center in New York.

== Career ==
Professor Tsang studies metabolic signaling in retinal diseases, as well as gene therapy and stem cell therapy to treat such diseases. In 2010, Tsang led an international research team that used embryonic stem cells of mice to replace diseased retinal cells in mice with retinitis pigmentosa to restore sight. In 2012, Tsang produced long term visual improvement in retinitis pigmentosa mouse models in two experiments, one using induced pluripotent stem cells and the other gene therapy. In 2015, Tsang was among the leaders of a team which discovered a gene mutation that can cause achromatopsia. In 2016, Tsang's team, in partnership with University of Iowa scientists, used the genome editing tool called CRISPR to repair a mutation that causes retinitis pigmentosa in patient derived stem cells. In 2018, Tsang and his team created a new technique for CRISPR, restoring function in the retina of mice affected by retinitis pigmentosa.

Tsang is a member of the Scientific Advisory Panel of Research to Prevent Blindness effective until 2029. He is also a standing member of the Pathophysiology of Eye Disease - 2 study section until 2026 and a member of the Alcon Research Institute Grants Review Committee.

Tsang is the editor of three books on regenerative medicine and precision medicine. He also edited a book on inherited retinal diseases. He has authored over 280 peer-reviewed articles, including articles published in Science, Journal of Clinical Investigation, and the New England Journal of Medicine.

== Education ==
Tsang was born in British Hong Kong's Evangel Hospital 播道醫院. He went to St. Teresa's Kindergarten and St. Teresa's Primary School (STS, 九龍聖德肋撒英文學校), then onto La Salle College, all in Kowloon, Hong Kong. He immigrated to the United States after La Salle College, graduating from Johns Hopkins University.

During college, Tsang trained in medical genetics under Professor Victor A. McKusick. He obtained an M.D.-Ph.D. from the NIH-National Institute of General Medical Sciences Medical Scientist Training Program at Columbia University. Tsang did his residency at Jules Stein Eye Institute/UCLA, and then he studied with Professors Alan C. Bird and Graham E. Holder, researching how to improve care of people suffering from macular degeneration.
