= Richard Trinkler =

Swiss racing cyclist (born 1950)

Personal information
- Full name: Richard Trinkler
- Nickname: Richi
- Born: 22 August 1950 (age 76) Sirnach, Thurgau, Switzerland
- Height: 1.76 m (5 ft 9 in)
- Weight: 67 kg (148 lb)

Cycling career
- Sport: Cycling
- Current team: Retired
- Discipline: Road
- Role: Rider
- Rider type: All-rounder / time trialist

Amateur team
- 1975–1986: RV Winterthur

Professional teams
- 1987: Fibok–Müller–Sidermec
- 1988–1989: Weinmann–La Suisse

Major wins
- Tour de Luxembourg (1988); Grand Prix Guillaume Tell (1979, 1983)

Richard Trinkler
Medal record

Men's road bicycle racing

Representing SUI

Olympic Games
Silver medal – second place	1984 Los Angeles	Team time trial

World Championships
Silver medal – second place	1982 Goodwood	Team time trial
Bronze medal – third place	1978 Nürburgring	Team time trial

Richard Trinkler (born 22 August 1950) is a Swiss former road racing cyclist. One of Switzerland's leading amateur riders of the late 1970s and early 1980s, he competed at three Summer Olympics and won a silver medal in the team time trial at the 1984 Summer Olympics in Los Angeles. He won two medals in the team time trial at the UCI Road World Championships, was twice winner of the Grand Prix Guillaume Tell, and after turning professional in 1987 won the Tour de Luxembourg in 1988.

== Early life ==
Trinkler was born in Sirnach in the canton of Thurgau. He raced for the Winterthur cycling club, RV Winterthur, throughout his amateur career.

== Amateur career ==
=== 1976 Olympics ===
Trinkler made his breakthrough in 1976, finishing third in the Grand Prix Guillaume Tell, and represented Switzerland in the individual road race at the 1976 Summer Olympics in Montreal.

=== World Championships and Swiss title ===
In 1978 he won his first world championship medal, a bronze in the amateur team time trial with Gilbert Glaus, Stefan Mutter and Kurt Ehrensperger. In 1979 he won the Grand Prix Guillaume Tell overall, including stage victories, became Swiss amateur road race champion, and finished ninth in the amateur road race at the World Championships in Valkenburg.

=== 1980 Olympics ===
At the 1980 Summer Olympics in Moscow, Trinkler finished 14th in the team time trial with Gilbert Glaus, Fritz Joost and Jürg Luchs, and 29th in the individual road race.

=== 1982–1983 ===
After a weaker 1981 season, Trinkler won his second world championship medal at the 1982 UCI Road World Championships in Goodwood, England, taking silver in the team time trial with Alfred Achermann, Daniel Heggli and Urs Zimmermann, behind the Netherlands.

In 1983 he became the first rider to win the Grand Prix Guillaume Tell twice. That year he also won a stage of the Coors Classic in the United States, as well as the Giro del Mendrisiotto, the Grand Prix de Lancy and the Schynberg-Rundfahrt.

=== 1984 Olympic silver ===
In 1984 Trinkler won a stage of the Tour of Austria and finished second overall in the Tour du Loir-et-Cher. At the 1984 Summer Olympics in Los Angeles, competing in his third Games, he won the silver medal in the 100 km team time trial with Alfred Achermann, Laurent Vial and Benno Wiss, finishing behind Italy.

== Professional career ==
Trinkler turned professional in 1987, aged 36, with the Fibok–Müller–Sidermec team, finishing third in the Tour du Nord-Ouest that year. In 1988, riding for Weinmann–La Suisse, he won the Tour de Luxembourg overall, together with a stage of the race. He retired after the 1989 season.

== Major results ==
1976
3rd Grand Prix Guillaume Tell
1978
3rd Team time trial, UCI Road World Championships (amateur)
1979
1st Road race, National Amateur Road Championships
1st Overall Grand Prix Guillaume Tell
9th Road race, UCI Road World Championships (amateur)
1980
14th Team time trial, Olympic Games
1982
2nd Team time trial, UCI Road World Championships (amateur)
1983
1st Overall Grand Prix Guillaume Tell
1st Stage, Coors Classic
1984
2nd Team time trial, Olympic Games
2nd Overall Tour du Loir-et-Cher
1987
3rd Tour du Nord-Ouest
1988
1st Overall Tour de Luxembourg

1st Stage
