= Håkan Larsson (cyclist) =

Swedish cyclist

Personal information
- Born: 23 January 1958 (age 68) Stockholm, Sweden

Cycling career
- Sport: Cycling

Håkan Larsson (born 23 January 1958) is a Swedish former cyclist. He competed in the team time trial event at the 1984 Summer Olympics.
