= Lars Jensen (cyclist) =

Danish cyclist

Personal information
- Born: 3 March 1964 (age 62) Midtjylland, Denmark

Cycling career
- Sport: Cycling

Lars Jensen (born 3 March 1964) is a Danish former cyclist. He competed in the team time trial event at the 1984 Summer Olympics.
