= Majed Abdul Rahim Habib Ullah =

Saudi Arabian fencer

Personal information
- Born: 1964 (age 61–62)

Sport
- Sport: Fencing

Majed Abdul Rahim Habib Ullah (Arabic: ماجد عبد الرحيم; born 1964) is a Saudi Arabian fencer. He competed in the individual foil event at the 1984 Summer Olympics.
