= James Kreglo =

American fencer

Personal information
- Born: August 8, 1956 (age 69) Huntington, West Virginia, United States

Sport
- Sport: Fencing

James Kreglo (born August 8, 1956) is a fencer from the United States Virgin Islands. He competed in the individual foil and sabre events at the 1984 Summer Olympics.
