= Frank Beck (fencer) =

German fencer

Personal information
- Born: 26 June 1961 (age 65) Tauberbischofsheim, West Germany

Sport
- Sport: Fencing
Medal record
Men's fencing
Representing West Germany
Olympic Games
| Silver medal – second place | 1984 Los Angeles | Foil, team |

Frank Beck (born 26 June 1961) is a German former fencer. Beck fought for the Fencing-Club Tauberbischofsheim. He won a silver medal in the team foil event at the 1984 Summer Olympics.
