= Liu Fu (cyclist) =

Chinese cyclist (born 1957)

Personal information
- Born: 7 April 1957 (age 69)

Cycling career
- Sport: Cycling

Liu Fu (born 7 April 1957) is a Chinese former cyclist. He competed in the team time trial event at the 1984 Summer Olympics and 1978 Asian Games.
