= Andrea Borella =

Italian fencer (born 1961)

Personal information
- Born: 23 June 1961 (age 65) Mestre, Italy

Sport
- Sport: Fencing
Medal record
Men's fencing
Representing Italy
Olympic Games
Gold medal – first place	1984 Los Angeles	Team foil
World Championships
Gold medal – first place	1986 Sofia	Individual foil
Gold medal – first place	1986 Sofia	Team foil
Gold medal – first place	1990 Lyon	Team foil
Gold medal – first place	1994 Athens	Team foil
Silver medal – second place	1977 Buenos Aires	Team foil
Silver medal – second place	1979 Melbourne	Team foil
Silver medal – second place	1981 Clermont-Ferrand	Team foil
Silver medal – second place	1990 Lyon	Individual foil
Silver medal – second place	1993 Essen	Team foil
Bronze medal – third place	1982 Rome	Team foil
Summer Universiade
Gold medal – first place	1981 Bucharest	Team foil
Gold medal – first place	1983 Edmonton	Team foil
Silver medal – second place	1979 Mexico City	Team foil
Bronze medal – third place	1983 Edmonton	Individual foil
Bronze medal – third place	1985 Kobe	Team foil
Bronze medal – third place	1989 Duisburg	Team foil
Mediterranean Games
Bronze medal – third place	1991 Athens	Individual foil

Andrea Borella (born 23 June 1961) is an Italian fencer. His team won a gold medal in the team foil event at the 1984 Summer Olympics. He won a bronze medal in the individual foil event at the 1991 Mediterranean Games. Borella won European Championships in 1981 and 1983, as well as three World Cups. He is married to Francesca Bortolozzi, who was also an Olympic fencing champion for Italy.
