= Stefan Joos =

Belgian fencer

Personal information
- Born: 3 April 1963 (age 63) Uccle, Belgium

Sport
- Sport: Fencing

Stefan Joos (born 3 April 1963) is a Belgian fencer. He competed at the 1984 and 1988 Summer Olympics. His brother, Peter Joos, also fenced for Belgium at the 1984 Games.
