= Dag Hopen =

Norwegian cyclist

Personal information
- Born: 6 April 1961 (age 65) Tønsberg, Norway

Cycling career
- Sport: Cycling

Dag Hopen (born 6 April 1961) is a Norwegian former cyclist. He competed in the team time trial event at the 1984 Summer Olympics.
