= Julito Francis =

United States Virgin Islands fencer

Personal information
- Born: 5 May 1962 (age 64)

Sport
- Sport: Fencing

Julito Francis (born May 5, 1962) is a fencer from the United States Virgin Islands. He competed in the individual foil event at the 1984 Summer Olympics.
