= Peter Joos =

Belgian fencer

Personal information
- Born: 14 August 1961 (age 64)

Sport
- Sport: Fencing

Peter Joos (born 14 August 1961) is a Belgian fencer. He competed in the individual and team foil events at the 1984 Summer Olympics. His brother, Stefan Joos, also fenced for Belgium at the 1984 Games.
