= Claudio Vandelli =

Italian cyclist

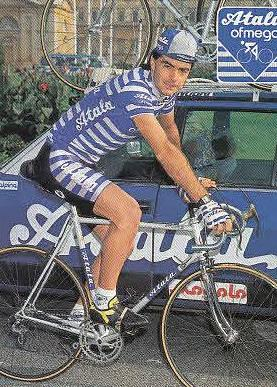

Personal information
- Born: 27 July 1961 (age 65) Modena, Italy

Cycling career
- Sport: Cycling
- Discipline: Road
- Role: Rider
Medal record
Representing Italy
Men's road cycling
Olympic Games
Gold medal – first place	1984 Los Angeles	Men's team time trial

Claudio Vandelli is an Italian cyclist. He won the gold medal in Men's team time trial at the 1984 Summer Olympics
