= Tsang Wing Sze =

Hong Kong swimmer

Personal information
- Born: 23 August 1972 (age 53)

Sport
- Sport: Swimming

Tsang Wing Sze (born 23 August 1972) is a Hong Kong freestyle and backstroke swimmer. She competed in three events at the 1988 Summer Olympics.
