= Thierry Soumagne =

Belgian fencer (born 1953)

Personal information
- Born: 17 October 1953 (age 72) Uccle, Belgium

Sport
- Sport: Fencing

Thierry Soumagne (born 17 October 1953) is a Belgian fencer. He competed at the 1976, 1980, 1984 and 1988 Summer Olympics.
