= Chu Shisheng =

Chinese fencer

Personal information
- Born: 20 October 1959 (age 66)

Sport
- Sport: Fencing

Chu Shisheng (born 20 October 1959) is a Chinese fencer. He competed in the individual and team foil events at the 1984 Summer Olympics.
