= Henri Darricau =

Lebanese fencer

Personal information
- Born: 30 October 1955 (age 70)

Sport
- Sport: Fencing

Henri Darricau (born 30 October 1955) is a Lebanese fencer. He competed in the individual and team foil events at the 1984 Summer Olympics. He has lived in Denver, Colorado since 1979, and served as the head coach for the University of Colorado Fencing Club from 1983 to 1992.
