= Nick Bell (fencer) =

British fencer (born 1950)

Personal information
- Born: 5 September 1950 (age 75) Guildford, England

Sport
- Sport: Fencing

Nicholas Julian Bell (born 5 September 1950) is a British fencer. He competed at the 1976 and 1984 Summer Olympics. In 1977, he won the foil title at the British Fencing Championships.

He later went to the 1999 World Championships at the age of 49, after two years earlier taking up epee. A return to foil in 2004 lead to him winning that year's Welsh open.
