= Georg Somloi =

Austrian fencer

Personal information
- Born: 16 March 1960 (age 66)

Sport
- Sport: Fencing

Georg Somloi (born 16 March 1960) is an Austrian fencer. He competed in the individual and team foil events at the 1984 Summer Olympics.
