= Ahmed Diab =

Egyptian fencer (born 1954)

Personal information
- Born: 11 July 1954 (age 72)

Sport
- Sport: Fencing

Ahmed Diab (born 11 July 1954) is an Egyptian fencer. He competed in the foil events at the 1984 Summer Olympics.
