= Watt Kam Sing =

Hong Kong swimmer (born 1967)

Personal information
- Born: 6 June 1967 (age 59)

Sport
- Sport: Swimming

Watt Kam Sing (born 6 June 1967) is a Hong Kong breaststroke swimmer. He competed at the 1984 Summer Olympics and the 1988 Summer Olympics.
