= Choy Yiu Chung =

Hong Kong cyclist (born 1961)

Personal information
- Native name
- Traditional Chinese: 蔡耀忠
- Simplified Chinese: 蔡耀忠
Transcriptions
Standard Mandarin
- Hanyu Pinyin: Cài Yàozhōng
- Wade–Giles: Ts'ai Yao-chung
Yue: Cantonese
- Jyutping: Coi3 Jiu3 Zung1
- Nationality: Hong Konger
- Born: 1 March 1961 (age 64)

Sport
- Sport: Cycling

Choy Yiu Chung (Chinese: 蔡耀忠; born 1 March 1961) is a Hong Kong former cyclist and coach. He competed in the individual road race and the team time trial events at the 1984 Summer Olympics. He did not finish in the individual road race. He received a bronze medal at the Asian Cycling Championships in 1985. Around 1994, Choy became the head coach of the Hong Kong national cycling team.

== Career ==
Choy won the 1980–1981 Marlboro Super Series. He won another event at the competition in December 1981, which brought his Nam Van team to first place. At a Marlboro Super Series event held in February 1983, Choy won, beating the next contestant by three seconds. At a Marlboro Super Series event held in May 1983 on Lantau Island, Choy won an event. In 1983, Choy raced in Australia in the Blue Mountain Classic and competed in the Brisbane–Sydney road race. To prepare for the 1984 Summer Olympics, Choy practiced racing in Belgium a month prior to the competition and was trained by Belgian coach Hugo Geuens. During the Grand Prix of As, a semi-classic racing competition in As in Belgium, Choy placed fourth. Cyclist Erwin Ummels, who won the race, called Choy "absolutely the strongest rider in the field". During Choy's competition in a Lokeren race, his bicycle broke so he had to switch to a second bike. He then suffered a muscle strain which caused him to fail to compete at the Hulshout competition Grand Prix Marcel Indekeu.

Choy and three others made up the Hong Kong cycling team for the 1984 Olympics. Choy competed at the team time trial event at the 1984 Olympics. During the Olympics competition, Choy found the route to be tough and mountainous. When he had completed six of the nine laps, he was positioned centrally in the pack. When he had completed lap 10, he withdrew from the competition. Choy said, "If it had only been one more lap I think I could have made it. It was very hilly and I haven't raced on hills for nearly six weeks."

At the 1985 Asian Cycling Championships held in South Korea, Choy received a bronze medal. Colin Ruffell of the South China Morning Post in 1985 called Choy "cycling's Mr Flash", writing, "The tall, rapier-thin bike star with the penchant for gaudy racing jerseys and hi-tech equipment simply has no opposition." Choy competed in the 1986 Asian Games in the 4 km individual pursuit and was defeated in the quarterfinals by Yoshihiro Tsumuraya, who won the event in the finals. Choy was the owner of a bicycle store in 1989 and had taken nearly two years off from training to run it. To prepare for the 1990 Asian Games, he decided to step away from the store for a year to train in Melbourne.

Around 1994, Choy became the head coach of the Hong Kong national cycling team. He trained nine people to get ready for the 1994 Commonwealth Games and 1994 Asian Games. For the Commonwealth Games, he needed to select five of those athletes to compete. As part of the training, Choy had the athletes race on the road and do weightlifting. Nearly every day, he communicated the training details to the Hong Kong Cycling Association.
