= Mike McCahey =

American fencer

Michael McCahey
Personal information
- Born: December 20, 1954 (age 71) Chicago, Illinois, United States

Sport
- Sport: Fencing

Michael McCahey (born December 20, 1954) is an American fencer. He competed in the individual and team foil events at the 1984 Summer Olympics.
