= Tadashi Shimokawa =

Japanese fencer

Personal information
- Born: 27 June 1962 (age 64)

Sport
- Sport: Fencing

Tadashi Shimokawa (下川 禎, Shimokawa Tadashi) (born 27 June 1962) is a Japanese fencer. He competed in the individual and team foil events at the 1984 Summer Olympics.
