= Abdel Monem El-Husseiny =

Egyptian fencer

Abdel Moneim El Husseiny
Personal information
- Born: 7 August 1966 (age 60)

Sport
- Sport: Fencing

Abdel Moneim El-Husseiny (born 7 August 1966) is an Egyptian former foil fencer. He competed at the 1984 and 1988 Summer Olympics and is currently the interim president of the FIE and the president of the national Fencing federation in Egypt. He is the father of Suzanne El-Husseiny, Egyptian tennis player.

== 2022 Controversy ==
In November 2022 he was in the center of a controversy scandal when several FIE members were trying to silence the discussion of safety for Women and LBTQ.

Otto Drakenberg, chairman for the Swedish Fencing Federation, was trying to raise concerns for Women and LBTQ-people if choosing Saudi Arabia as the host country for the World Cadets and Juniors Fencing Championships 2024. His speech was concerining that women, lesbian, gay, bisexual and transgender participants might end up not going to the championship due to safety concerns and the risk of be imprisoned in the country.

During his speech, some members in the FIE started yelling and hitting the tables to drown the scheduled speech. Abdel, as vice president for FIE, publicly told Otto to not talk about such topics, supporting the undemocratic actions from parts of the delegates. Although Abdel together with the yelling delegates continued trying to silence the topic, Otto was somewhat successfully able to finish his speech.

The incident resulted in FIE and Abdel being reported to International Olympic Committee for hindering a delegate to discuss a topic on the agenda.
