= Haluk Yamaç =

Turkish fencer (born 1957)

Personal information
- Born: 19 November 1957 (age 68)

Sport
- Sport: Fencing
Medal record
Mediterranean Games
Gold medal – first place	1983 Casablanca	Individual foil

Haluk Yamaç (born 19 November 1957) is a Turkish fencer. He competed in the individual foil event at the 1984 Summer Olympics. He won a gold medal in the individual foil event at the 1983 Mediterranean Games.
