= José Rafael Magallanes =

Venezuelan fencer (born 1955)

Personal information
- Nationality: Venezuelan
- Born: 26 September 1955 (age 70)

Sport
- Sport: Fencing

José Rafael Magallanes (born 26 September 1955) is a Venezuelan fencer. He competed in the individual foil and épée events at the 1984 Summer Olympics.
