= Philippe Omnès =

French fencer (born 1960)

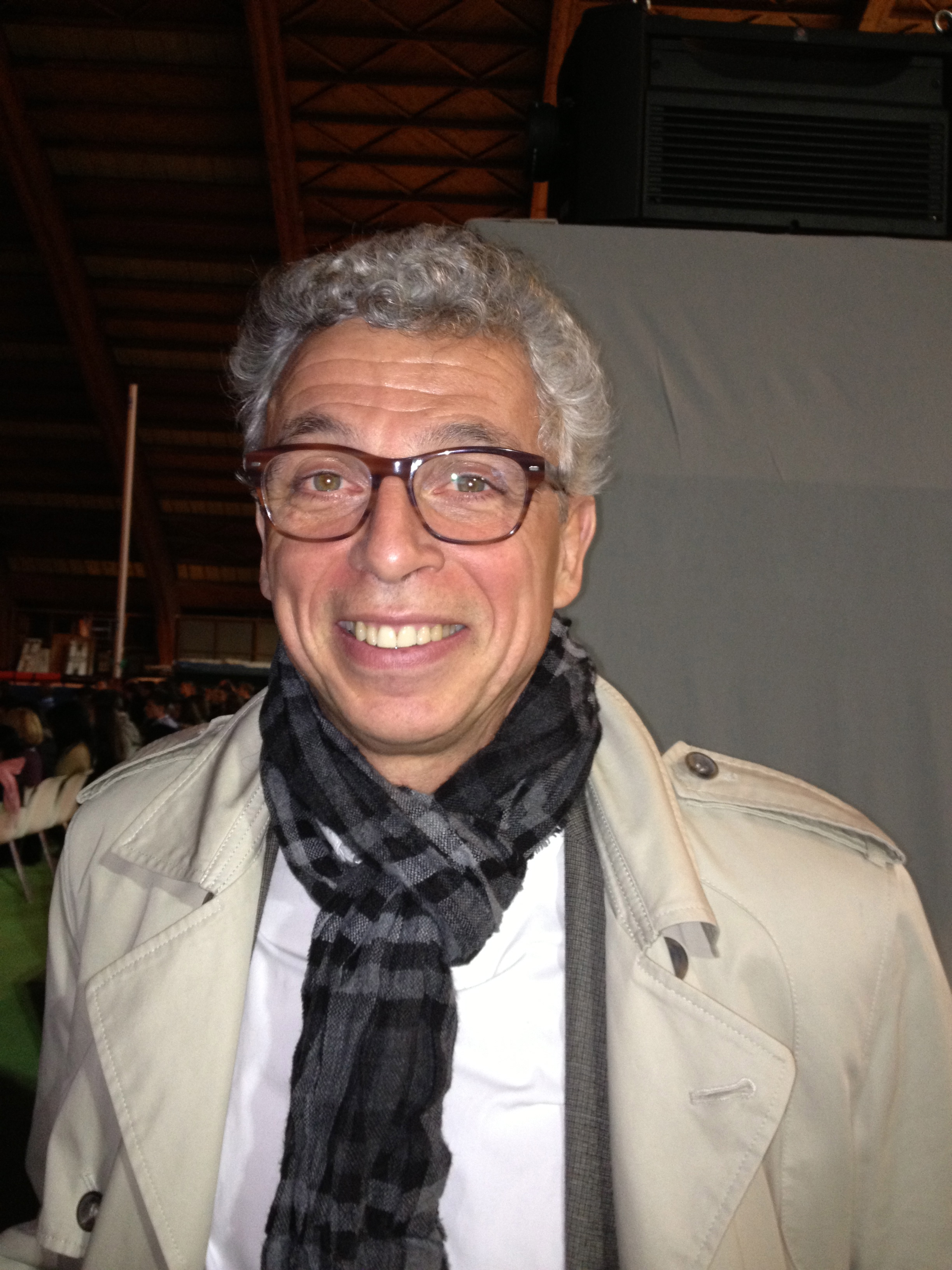
- Omnès, 2012

Personal information
- Born: 6 August 1960 (age 65) Paris, France

Sport
- Sport: Fencing
Medal record
Men's fencing
Representing France
Olympic Games
| Gold medal – first place | 1992 Barcelona | Individual foil |
| Bronze medal – third place | 1984 Los Angeles | Team foil |
Mediterranean Games
| Silver medal – second place | 1991 Athens | Individual foil |
| Bronze medal – third place | 1993 Languedoc-Roussillon | Individual foil |

Philippe Omnès (born 6 August 1960) is a French fencer and Olympic champion in the foil competition.

He won a gold medal in individual foil event at the 1992 Summer Olympics in Barcelona.

He competed in the individual foil event at the Mediterranean Games winning a silver medal in 1991 and a bronze medal in 1993.
