= Kenichi Umezawa =

Japanese fencer (born 1957)

Personal information
- Born: 20 January 1957 (age 69)

Sport
- Sport: Fencing

Kenichi Umezawa (梅沢 賢一, Umezawa Ken'ichi) (born 20 January 1957) is a Japanese fencer. He competed in the individual and team foil events at the 1984 and 1988 Summer Olympics.
