= Benno Wiss =

Swiss cyclist

Personal information
- Born: 13 July 1962 (age 64) Dietwil, Switzerland

Cycling career
- Sport: Cycling
Medal record
Men's cycling
Representing Switzerland
Olympic Games
Silver medal – second place	1984 Los Angeles	Team time trial

Benno Wiss (born 13 July 1962) is a Swiss retired track cyclist and road bicycle racer, who was a professional road rider from 1984 to 1986. He participated in the 1984 Summer Olympics in Los Angeles, California, where he won the silver medal in the men's team time trial, alongside Alfred Achermann, Richard Trinkler and Laurent Vial. He is a two-time winner of the Circuit Franco-Belge.
