= Khaled Al-Awadhi =

Kuwaiti fencer

Personal information
- Born: 13 September 1964 (age 61)

Sport
- Sport: Fencing

Khaled Al-Awadhi (born 13 September 1964) is a Kuwaiti former fencer. He competed in the individual and team foil events at the 1980, 1984 and 1988 Summer Olympics.
