= Guillermo Gutiérrez (cyclist) =

Mexican cyclist

Personal information
- Born: 8 June 1964 (age 62)

Cycling career
- Sport: Cycling

Guillermo Gutiérrez (born 8 June 1964) is a Mexican cyclist. He competed at the 1984 Summer Olympics and the 1988 Summer Olympics.
