= Edgardo Díez =

Puerto Rican fencer

Personal information
- Born: 18 April 1961 (age 65)

Sport
- Sport: Fencing

Edgardo Díez (born 18 April 1961) is a Puerto Rican fencer. He competed in the individual foil event at the 1984 Summer Olympics.
