= Tsang Yi Ming =

Hong Kong swimmer (born 1966)

Personal information
- Born: 26 March 1966 (age 60)

Sport
- Sport: Swimming

Tsang Yi Ming (born 26 March 1966) is a Hong Kong butterfly, freestyle and medley swimmer. He competed at the 1984 Summer Olympics in Los Angeles and the 1988 Summer Olympics in Seoul.
