= Zang (surname) =

Zang (臧)
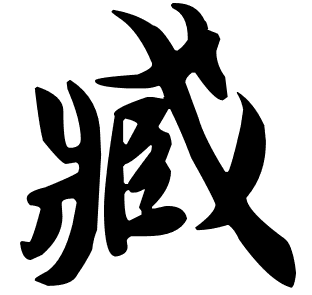
- Pronunciation: Zāng (Mandarin)
- Language: Chinese

Origin
- Language: Old Chinese

Other names
- Variant form: Tsang

Zang is the Mandarin pinyin romanization of the Chinese surname written 臧 in Chinese character. It is romanized Tsang in Wade–Giles. It is listed 112th in the Song dynasty classic text Hundred Family Surnames. As of 2008, it is the 241st most common surname in China, shared by 310,000 people, with the province with the most being Shandong.

== Notable people ==
- Zang Tu (died 202 BC), King of Yan of the Han dynasty
- Zang Gong (臧宫; died 58 AD), Eastern Han general, Marquis of Langling
- Zang Hong (臧洪; died 196), Eastern Han general
- Zang Ba (c. 162–230s), Eastern Han and Three Kingdoms general
- Zang Aiqin (臧愛親; 360–408), wife of Liu Yu, Emperor Wu of Liu Song
- Zang Zhi (臧质; 400–454), Liu Song general
- Zang Maoxun (1550–1620), Ming dynasty playwright
- Zang Shiyi (1884–1956), Republic of China Governor of Liaoning, politician of Manchukuo
- Zang Qifang (臧启芳; 1894–1961), Republic of China Mayor of Tianjin, president of Northeastern University
- Zang Kejia (1905–2004), poet
- Zang Boping (臧伯平; 1913–2005), president of Nankai University, Deputy Minister of Education
- Zang Yuyan (臧玉琰; 1923–2005), singer
- Zang Cailing (born 1954), football player and coach
- Zang Jinsheng (born 1959), actor
- Sheng Xue or Zang Xihong (born 1962), Chinese-Canadian writer
- Zang Tianshuo (born 1964), rock musician
- Zang Haili (born 1978), football player
- Zang Jialiang (born 1988), Olympic curler
- Zang Yifeng (born 1993), football player
- Zang Wenbo (born 1996), figure skater
