= Ko Yin Fai =

Hong Kong fencer

Personal information
- Born: 18 January 1960 Hong Kong
- Died: 17 July 2010 (aged 50) Shanghai, China

Sport
- Sport: Fencing

Ko Yin Fai (18 January 1960 – 17 July 2010) was a Hong Kong fencer. He competed in the individual and team foil events at the 1984 Summer Olympics.
