= Bilal Rifaat =

Egyptian fencer

Personal information
- Nationality: Egyptian
- Born: 27 September 1957 (age 68) Alexandria Egypt
- Height: 173 cm (5 ft 8 in)

Sport
- Sport: Fencing
- College team: Civil Engineering
- Club: Alexandria Fencing Club
- Retired: 1984

Achievements and titles
- Regional finals: Egypt Champion 1976,1980,1982,1984

Bilal Rifaat (born 27 September 1957) is an Egyptian fencer. He competed in the individual and team foil events at the 1984 Summer Olympics.
