= Lai Yee Lap =

Hong Kong fencer

Personal information
- Born: 12 November 1961 (age 64)

Chinese name
- Traditional Chinese: 賴以立
- Yale Romanization: Laaih Yíhlahp
- Jyutping: Laai6 Ji5lap6

Sport
- Sport: Fencing

Rod Lai Yee Lap (賴以立; born 12 November 1961) is a Hong Kong fencer. He competed in the foil and épée events at the 1984 Summer Olympics. He was later a member of the examination board of the Hong Kong Fencing Association.
