= Bill Gosbee =

British fencer (born 1961)

Personal information
- Born: 20 May 1961 (age 65) London, England

Sport
- Sport: Fencing

William David Gosbee (born 20 May 1961) better known as Bill Gosbee is a British fencer. He competed in the individual and team foil events at the 1984, 1988 and 1992 Summer Olympics. He was a five-time British fencing champion, winning five foil titles at the British Fencing Championships, from 1984 to 1992.
