= Yu Yifeng =

Chinese fencer

Personal information
- Born: 6 June 1963 (age 63)

Sport
- Sport: Fencing

Yu Yifeng (born 6 June 1963) is a Chinese fencer. He competed in the individual and team foil events at the 1984 Summer Olympics.
