= Nobuyuki Azuma =

Japanese fencer

Personal information
- Born: 7 April 1959 (age 67)

Sport
- Sport: Fencing

Nobuyuki Azuma (東 伸行, Azuma Nobuyuki) (born 7 April 1959) is a Japanese fencer. He competed in the individual and team foil events at the 1984 Summer Olympics.
