= Leung Hung Tak =

Hong Kong cyclist

Personal information
- Full name: 梁鴻德, jyutping: loeng4 hung4 dak1
- Born: 17 October 1963 (age 62)

Cycling career
- Sport: Cycling

Leung Hung Tak (born 17 October 1963) is a Hong Kong former cyclist. He competed at the 1984 Summer Olympics and the 1988 Summer Olympics.
