= Hung Chung Yam =

Hong Kong cyclist (born 1963)

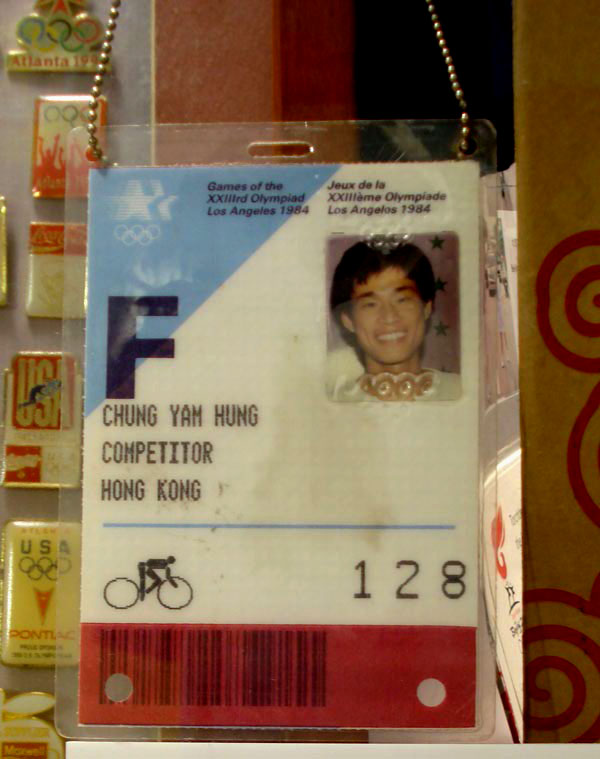
- Hung Chung Yam Identification Card as a competitor in Hong Kong

Personal information
- Full name: 洪松蔭, jyutping: hung4 cung4 jam3
- Born: 19 December 1963 (age 62)

Cycling career
- Sport: Cycling

Hung Chung Yam (born 19 December 1963) is a Hong Kong former cyclist. He competed at the 1984 Summer Olympics and the 1988 Summer Olympics.
