= Swimming at the 1984 Summer Olympics – Men's 200 metre individual medley =

Men's 200 metre individual medley at the Games of the XXIII Olympiad
- Venue: McDonald's Olympic Swim Stadium
- Date: 4 August 1984 (heats & final)
- Competitors: 46 from 32 nations
- Winning time: 2:01.42 WR

Medalists
1st place, gold medalist(s)		Alex Baumann	Canada
2nd place, silver medalist(s)		Pablo Morales	United States
3rd place, bronze medalist(s)		Neil Cochran	Great Britain

The final of the men's 200 metre individual medley event at the 1984 Summer Olympics was held in the McDonald's Olympic Swim Stadium in Los Angeles, California, on August 4, 1984. 46 athletes competed in the heats, with the eight fastest qualifying for the final.

== Records ==
Prior to this competition, the existing world and Olympic records were as follows.

World record	Alex Baumann (CAN)	2:02.25	Brisbane, Australia	1 August 1982
Olympic record	Gunnar Larsson (SWE)	2:07.17	Munich, West Germany	3 September 1972

The following records were established during the competition:

Date	Round	Name	Nation	Time	Record
4 August	Heat 5	Alex Baumann	Canada	2:03.60	OR
4 August	Final A	Alex Baumann	Canada	2:01.42	WR

== Results ==
=== Heats ===
Rule: The eight fastest swimmers advance to final A (Q), while the next eight to final B (q).

Rank	Heat	Lane	Name	Nationality	Time	Notes
1	5	4	Alex Baumann	Canada	2:03.60	Q, OR
2	3	5	Robin Brew	Great Britain	2:04.13	Q, EU
3	3	4	Pablo Morales	United States	2:04.32	Q
4	1	4	Neil Cochran	Great Britain	2:05.39	Q
5	6	6	Nicolai Klapkarek	West Germany	2:06.07	Q
6	4	4	Steve Lundquist	United States	2:06.10	Q
7	3	3	Ralf Diegel	West Germany	2:06.41	Q
8	4	5	Andrew Phillips	Jamaica	2:06.43	Q
9	1	5	Rob Woodhouse	Australia	2:06.45	q
10	6	4	Giovanni Franceschi	Italy	2:06.76	q
11	2	4	Ricardo Prado	Brazil	2:07.16	q, WD
12	6	3	Maurizio Divano	Italy	2:07.19	q
13	5	5	Mikael Örn	Sweden	2:07.56	q
14	4	3	Shinji Ito	Japan	2:07.76	q
15	2	6	Peter Rohde	Denmark	2:07.93	q
16	1	3	Arne Borgstrøm	Norway	2:08.09	q
17	4	6	Pablo Restrepo	Colombia	2:08.12	q
18	5	3	Edsard Schlingemann	Netherlands	2:08.27	
19	5	6	Harri Garmendia	Spain	2:08.30	
20	6	5	Anders Peterson	Sweden	2:08.35	
21	2	5	Rob Chernoff	Canada	2:08.47	
22	2	3	Glenn Beringen	Australia	2:08.65	
23	4	2	Eduardo Morillo	Mexico	2:09.87	
24	6	2	Chen Qin	China	2:10.30	
25	3	6	Feng Dawei	China	2:11.30	
26	1	6	Andrey Aguilar	Costa Rica	2:11.63	
27	5	2	Yoram Kochavy	Israel	2:11.81	
28	4	7	Jairulla Jaitulla	Philippines	2:12.82	
29	1	2	Luis Juncos	Argentina	2:12.83	
30	1	7	Emad El-Shafei	Egypt	2:14.87	
31	2	2	David Morley	Bahamas	2:16.85	
32	2	7	Tsang Yi Ming	Hong Kong	2:17.75	
33	6	1	Ng Wing Hon	Hong Kong	2:18.64	
34	6	8	Samuela Tupou	Fiji	2:19.79	
35	4	1	Brian Farlow	Virgin Islands	2:20.53	
36	3	8	Salvador Corelo	Honduras	2:22.29	
37	5	1	Harry Wozniak	Barbados	2:22.49	
38	2	1	Roberto Granados	Guatemala	2:22.73	
39	1	1	Warren Sorby	Fiji	2:22.74	
40	3	1	Harrell Woolard	Virgin Islands	2:27.51	
41	4	8	Michele Piva	San Marino	2:29.81	
42	5	8	Joaquim Cruz	Mozambique	2:35.99	
	3	7	Fernando Rodríguez	Peru	DSQ	
	5	7	Manuel Gutiérrez	Panama	DSQ	
	6	7	Gökhan Attaroglu	Turkey	DSQ	
	3	2	Alexander Pilhatsch	Austria	DNS	

=== Finals ===
==== Final B ====
Rank	Lane	Name	Nationality	Time	Notes
9	4	Rob Woodhouse	Australia	2:04.86	OC
10	2	Shinji Ito	Japan	2:06.07	AS
11	5	Giovanni Franceschi	Italy	2:06.10	
12	3	Maurizio Divano	Italy	2:06.72	
13	7	Peter Rohde	Denmark	2:07.10	
14	2	Arne Borgstrøm	Norway	2:08.03	
15	8	Pablo Restrepo	Colombia	2:08.35	
16	6	Mikael Örn	Sweden	2:11.79	

==== Final A ====
Rank	Lane	Name	Nationality	Time	Notes
1st place, gold medalist(s)	4	Alex Baumann	Canada	2:01.42	WR
2nd place, silver medalist(s)	3	Pablo Morales	United States	2:03.05	
3rd place, bronze medalist(s)	6	Neil Cochran	Great Britain	2:04.38	
4	5	Robin Brew	Great Britain	2:04.52	
5	7	Steve Lundquist	United States	2:04.91	
6	8	Andrew Phillips	Jamaica	2:05.60	NR
7	2	Nicolai Klapkarek	West Germany	2:05.88	NR
8	1	Ralf Diegel	West Germany	2:06.66	
