= Swimming at the 1984 Summer Olympics – Men's 200 metre breaststroke =

Men's 200 metre breaststroke at the Games of the XXIII Olympiad
- Venue: McDonald's Olympic Swim Stadium
- Date: 2 August 1984 (heats & final)
- Competitors: 49 from 35 nations
- Winning time: 2:13.34 WR

Medalists
1st place, gold medalist(s)		Victor Davis	Canada
2nd place, silver medalist(s)		Glenn Beringen	Australia
3rd place, bronze medalist(s)		Étienne Dagon	Switzerland

The final of the men's 200 metre breaststroke event at the 1984 Summer Olympics was held in the McDonald's Olympic Swim Stadium in Los Angeles, California, on August 2, 1984.

== Records ==
Prior to this competition, the existing world and Olympic records were as follows.

World record	Victor Davis (CAN)	2:14.58	Etobicoke, Canada	17 June 1984
Olympic record	David Wilkie (GBR)	2:15.11	Montreal, Canada	24 July 1976

The following records were established during the competition:

Date	Round	Name	Nation	Time	Record
2 August	Final A	Victor Davis	Canada	2:13.34	WR

== Results ==
=== Heats ===
Rule: The eight fastest swimmers advance to final A (Q), while the next eight to final B (q).

Rank	Heat	Lane	Name	Nationality	Time	Notes
1	6	4	Glenn Beringen	Australia	2:17.29	Q
2	7	4	Victor Davis	Canada	2:18.20	Q
3	3	5	Marco Del Prete	Italy	2:18.90	Q, NR
4	7	5	Étienne Dagon	Switzerland	2:18.95	Q
5	4	4	Richard Schroeder	United States	2:19.23	Q
6	1	5	Ken Fitzpatrick	Canada	2:19.74	Q
7	4	3	Alexandre Yokochi	Portugal	2:19.76	Q
8	5	5	Pablo Restrepo	Colombia	2:19.77	Q
9	6	5	Adrian Moorhouse	Great Britain	2:19.83	q
10	2	4	Shigehiro Takahashi	Japan	2:19.98	q
11	7	3	Thierry Pata	France	2:20.14	q, NR
12	3	3	Iain Campbell	Great Britain	2:20.78	q
13	1	4	Peter Evans	Australia	2:21.21	q, WD
14	5	3	Enrique Romero	Spain	2:21.25	q
15	4	6	Thomas Böhm	Austria	2:22.17	q
16	6	3	Kenji Watanabe	Japan	2:22.33	q
17	4	5	Raffaele Avagnano	Italy	2:22.90	q, WD
18	5	4	Gerald Mörken	West Germany	2:22.99	q, WD
19	2	6	Manuel Gutiérrez	Panama	2:23.02	q
20	1	3	Eduardo Morillo	Mexico	2:23.72	
21	2	5	Christophe Deneuville	France	2:24.54	
22	7	6	Peter Lang	West Germany	2:24.60	
23	6	6	Eyal Stigman	Israel	2:24.93	
24	2	3	Jan-Erick Olsen	Norway	2:25.75	
25	2	2	Francisco Guanco	Philippines	2:26.12	
26	5	2	Jin Fu	China	2:26.34	
27	1	2	Martti Järventaus	Finland	2:26.96	
28	6	2	Brett Austin	New Zealand	2:27.25	
29	4	2	Andrey Aguilar	Costa Rica	2:27.69	
30	1	6	Gerhard Prohaska	Austria	2:27.85	
31	4	7	Jorge Henao	Venezuela	2:28.03	
32	3	6	Paul Newallo	Trinidad and Tobago	2:28.88	
33	3	2	Oscar Ortigosa	Peru	2:29.73	
34	7	2	Julio César Falon	Argentina	2:30.40	
35	5	7	Jairulla Jaitulla	Philippines	2:30.87	
36	7	7	Victor Ruberry	Bermuda	2:31.48	
37	3	7	Tryggvi Helgason	Iceland	2:32.03	
38	6	7	Watt Kam Sing	Hong Kong	2:32.13	
39	7	1	Ayman Nadim	Egypt	2:33.17	
40	6	1	Fernando Marroquin	Guatemala	2:35.21	
41	4	1	Ahmad Al-Hahdoud	Kuwait	2:37.63	
42	1	1	David Palma	Honduras	2:37.65	
43	1	7	Brian Farlow	Virgin Islands	2:37.87	
44	5	1	Harrell Woolard	Virgin Islands	2:45.68	
	2	1	Luiz Carvalho	Brazil	DSQ	
	2	7	Árni Sigurðsson	Iceland	DSQ	
	5	6	Felix Morf	Switzerland	DSQ	
	3	1	Amine El-Domyati	Lebanon	DNS	
	3	4	John Moffet	United States	DNS	

=== Finals ===
==== Final B ====
Rank	Lane	Name	Nationality	Time	Notes
9	4	Adrian Moorhouse	Great Britain	2:18.83	
10	3	Thierry Pata	France	2:20.05	NR
11	6	Iain Campbell	Great Britain	2:20.62	
12	5	Shigehiro Takahashi	Japan	2:20.93	
13	2	Enrique Romero	Spain	2:21.19	
14	7	Thomas Böhm	Austria	2:22.09	
15	1	Kenji Watanabe	Japan	2:22.29	
16	8	Manuel Gutiérrez	Panama	2:23.13	

==== Final A ====
Rank	Lane	Name	Nationality	Time	Notes
1st place, gold medalist(s)	5	Victor Davis	Canada	2:13.34	WR
2nd place, silver medalist(s)	4	Glenn Beringen	Australia	2:15.79	OC
3rd place, bronze medalist(s)	6	Étienne Dagon	Switzerland	2:17.41	NR
4	2	Richard Schroeder	United States	2:18.03	
5	7	Ken Fitzpatrick	Canada	2:18.86	
6	8	Pablo Restrepo	Colombia	2:18.96	NR
7	1	Alexandre Yokochi	Portugal	2:20.69	
	3	Marco Del Prete	Italy	DSQ	
