= Swimming at the 1984 Summer Olympics – Men's 100 metre breaststroke =

Men's 100 metre breaststroke at the Games of the XXIII Olympiad
- Venue: McDonald's Olympic Swim Stadium
- Date: 29 July 1984 (heats & final)
- Competitors: 52 from 37 nations
- Winning time: 1:01.65 WR

Medalists
1st place, gold medalist(s)		Steve Lundquist	United States
2nd place, silver medalist(s)		Victor Davis	Canada
3rd place, bronze medalist(s)		Peter Evans	Australia

The final of the men's 100 metre breaststroke event at the 1984 Summer Olympics was held in the McDonald's Olympic Swim Stadium in Los Angeles, California, on July 29, 1984.

== Records ==
Prior to this competition, the existing world and Olympic records were as follows.

World record	John Moffet (USA)	1:02.13	Indianapolis, United States	25 June 1984
Olympic record	John Hencken (USA)	1:03.11	Montreal, Canada	20 July 1976

The following records were established during the competition:

Date	Round	Name	Nation	Time	Record
29 July	Heat 7	John Moffet	United States	1:02.16	OR
29 July	Final A	Steve Lundquist	United States	1:01.65	WR

== Results ==
=== Heats ===
Rule: The eight fastest swimmers advance to final A (Q), while the next eight to final B (q).

Rank	Heat	Lane	Name	Nationality	Time	Notes
1	7	4	John Moffet	United States	1:02.16	Q, OR
2	2	4	Peter Evans	Australia	1:02.87	Q, OC
3	5	5	Brett Stocks	Australia	1:03.46	Q
4	5	4	Gerald Mörken	West Germany	1:03.53	Q
5	6	4	Steve Lundquist	United States	1:03.55	Q
6	4	4	Victor Davis	Canada	1:03.63	Q
7	3	4	Adrian Moorhouse	Great Britain	1:04.06	Q
8	2	5	Raffaele Avagnano	Italy	1:04.09	Q
9	3	5	Gianni Minervini	Italy	1:04.37	q
10	1	4	Peter Lang	West Germany	1:04.40	q
11	6	5	Pablo Restrepo	Colombia	1:04.44	q
12	1	3	Thomas Böhm	Austria	1:04.60	q, NR
13	7	5	Shigehiro Takahashi	Japan	1:04.71	q
14	7	3	Iain Campbell	Great Britain	1:04.81	q
15	4	3	Brett Austin	New Zealand	1:04.83	q, NR
16	3	3	Peter Berggren	Sweden	1:04.95	q
17	7	2	Jin Fu	China	1:05.05	
18	2	3	Enrique Romero	Spain	1:05.19	NR
19	1	5	Marco Veilleux	Canada	1:05.34	
20	4	5	Étienne Dagon	Switzerland	1:05.37	
21	4	6	Jan-Erick Olsen	Norway	1:05.43	NR
22	3	6	Eyal Stigman	Israel	1:05.63	NR
23	2	6	Felix Morf	Switzerland	1:05.89	
24	1	2	Victor Ruberry	Bermuda	1:05.96	NR
24	6	6	Luiz Carvalho	Brazil	1:05.96	
26	3	2	Manuel Gutiérrez	Panama	1:06.07	
27	5	6	Kenji Watanabe	Japan	1:06.10	
28	5	3	Paul Newallo	Trinidad and Tobago	1:06.12	NR
29	6	3	Martti Järventaus	Finland	1:06.21	
30	7	6	Gerhard Prohaska	Austria	1:06.41	
31	5	2	Eduardo Morillo	Mexico	1:06.82	
32	7	7	Francisco Guanco	Philippines	1:07.55	
33	1	7	Tryggvi Helgason	Iceland	1:07.71	NR
34	1	6	Julio César Falón	Argentina	1:07.80	
34	4	6	Alexandre Yokochi	Portugal	1:07.80	
36	6	7	Jairulla Jaitulla	Philippines	1:08.00	
37	2	2	Watt Kam Sing	Hong Kong	1:08.07	
38	7	1	Árni Sigurðsson	Iceland	1:08.52	
39	5	7	Li Khai Kam	Hong Kong	1:08.75	
40	4	7	Jorge Henao	Venezuela	1:09.01	
41	3	7	Oscar Ortigosa	Peru	1:09.07	
42	6	1	Oon Jin Teik	Singapore	1:09.23	
43	2	7	Ayman Nadim	Egypt	1:09.51	
44	5	1	Fernando Marroquin	Guatemala	1:09.73	
45	4	1	Harrell Woolard	Virgin Islands	1:11.17	
46	3	1	Brian Farlow	Virgin Islands	1:11.27	
47	2	1	Ahmad Al-Hahdoud	Kuwait	1:13.01	
48	1	1	Michele Piva	San Marino	1:16.21	
49	7	8	Isaac Atish Wa-El	Kuwait	1:16.51	
50	6	8	Amine El-Domyati	Lebanon	1:19.10	
	5	8	Salvador Corelo	Honduras	DSQ	
	6	2	Wang Lin	China	DSQ	

=== Finals ===
==== Final B ====
Rank	Lane	Name	Nationality	Time	Notes
9	4	Gianni Minervini	Italy	1:03.99	
10	2	Shigehiro Takahashi	Japan	1:04.41	
11	5	Peter Lang	West Germany	1:04.43	
12	3	Pablo Restrepo	Colombia	1:04.79	
13	6	Thomas Böhm	Austria	1:04.99	
14	7	Iain Campbell	Great Britain	1:05.02	
15	1	Brett Austin	New Zealand	1:05.49	
16	8	Peter Berggren	Sweden	1:05.66	

==== Final A ====
Rank	Lane	Name	Nationality	Time	Notes
1st place, gold medalist(s)	2	Steve Lundquist	United States	1:01.65	WR
2nd place, silver medalist(s)	7	Victor Davis	Canada	1:01.99	NR
3rd place, bronze medalist(s)	5	Peter Evans	Australia	1:02.97	
4	1	Adrian Moorhouse	Great Britain	1:03.25	
5	4	John Moffet	United States	1:03.29	
6	3	Brett Stocks	Australia	1:03.49	
7	6	Gerald Mörken	West Germany	1:03.95	
8	8	Raffaele Avagnano	Italy	1:04.11	
