= Swimming at the 1983 Pan American Games – Men's 100 metre breaststroke =

Men's 100 metre breaststroke at the 1983 Pan American Games
- Venue: -
- Dates: August 17 (preliminaries and finals)
- Competitors: from - nations

Medalists
Gold medal	Steve Lundquist	United States
Silver medal	John Moffet	United States
Bronze medal	Pablo Restrepo	Colombia

The men's 100 metre breaststroke competition of the swimming events at the 1983 Pan American Games took place on 17 August. The last Pan American Games champion was Steve Lundquist of US.

This race consisted of two lengths of the pool, both lengths being in breaststroke.

== Results ==
All times are in minutes and seconds.

KEY:	q	Fastest non-qualifiers	Q	Qualified	GR	Games record	NR	National record	PB	Personal best	SB	Seasonal best

=== Final ===
The final was held on August 17.

Rank	Name	Nationality	Time	Notes
1st place, gold medalist(s)	Steve Lundquist	United States	1:02.28	WR
2nd place, silver medalist(s)	John Moffet	United States	1:02.36	
3rd place, bronze medalist(s)	Pablo Restrepo	Colombia	1:03.89	SA
4	Marco Veilleux	Canada	1:04.87	
5	Luiz Carvalho	Brazil	1:05.97	
6	Julio Falon	Argentina	1:06.37	
7	Pedro Hernández	Cuba	1:06.85	
8	Glen Sochasky	Venezuela	1:06.87	NR
