= Swimming at the 1983 Pan American Games – Men's 200 metre breaststroke =

Men's 200 metre breaststroke at the 1983 Pan American Games
- Venue: -
- Dates: August 20 (preliminaries and finals)
- Competitors: from - nations

Medalists
Gold medal	Steve Lundquist	United States
Silver medal	Pablo Restrepo	Colombia
Bronze medal	Doug Soltis	United States

The men's 200 metre breaststroke competition of the swimming events at the 1983 Pan American Games took place on 20 August. The last Pan American Games champion was Steve Lundquist of US.

This race consisted of four lengths of the pool, all in breaststroke.

== Results ==
All times are in minutes and seconds.

KEY:	q	Fastest non-qualifiers	Q	Qualified	GR	Games record	NR	National record	PB	Personal best	SB	Seasonal best

=== Final ===
The final was held on August 20.

Rank	Name	Nationality	Time	Notes
1st place, gold medalist(s)	Steve Lundquist	United States	2:19.31	GR
2nd place, silver medalist(s)	Pablo Restrepo	Colombia	2:20.21	
3rd place, bronze medalist(s)	Doug Soltis	United States	2:20.89	
4	Marco Veilleux	Canada	2:21.86	
5	Luiz Carvalho	Brazil	2:24.79	
6	Maviael Sampaio	Brazil	2:24.79	
7	Enrique Leite	Uruguay	2:27.57	NR
8	Glen Sochasky	Venezuela	2:27.82	NR
