= Paige Zemina =

American swimmer (born 1968)

Personal information
- Full name: Kathryn Paige Zemina
- Nickname: "Paige"
- National team: United States
- Born: February 15, 1968 (age 58) Boynton Beach, Florida, U.S.
- Height: 6 ft 0 in (1.83 m)
- Weight: 154 lb (70 kg)

Sport
- Sport: Swimming
- Strokes: Freestyle
- College team: University of Florida
Medal record
Women's swimming
Representing the United States
Olympic Games
Bronze medal – third place	1988 Seoul	4x100 m freestyle
Goodwill Games
Gold medal – first place	1986 Moscow	4x100 m freestyle
Gold medal – first place	1986 Moscow	4x200 m freestyle
Bronze medal – third place	1986 Moscow	100 m freestyle

Kathryn Paige Northcutt (born February 15, 1968), née Kathryn Paige Zemina, is an American former competition swimmer who was an Olympic bronze medalist.

== Early years ==
Zemina was born in Boynton Beach, Florida. She attended Fort Lauderdale High School in Fort Lauderdale, Florida, where her mother was an English teacher, and she swam for coach Jack Nelson's Fort Lauderdale Flying L's high school swim team. She was a five-time Florida state high school champion—three times in the 100-yard freestyle, and twice in the 200-yard freestyle. She set the national high school record of 1:48.60 seconds in the 200-yard freestyle in 1984. Zemina was also a member of a national record-setting team in the 200-meter freestyle relay (short course) in 1985. She graduated from high school in 1985.

== College swimming career ==
She accepted an athletic scholarship to attend the University of Florida in Gainesville, Florida, where she swam for coach Randy Reese's Florida Gators swimming and diving team in National Collegiate Athletic Association (NCAA) competition from 1986 to 1989. During her career as a Gator swimmer, Zemina was a five-time NCAA champion, including the 4x200-yard freestyle relay (1986, 1988, 1989), the 4x100-yard freestyle relay (1988), and the 4x50-yard medley relay (1989). She also received twelve All-American honors as a college swimmer.

== International swimming career ==
Zemina competed for United States national teams at international swimming tournaments in Germany (1983), Sweden (1984), Japan (1985), the Soviet Union (1986) and South Korea (1988). She became the center of a controversy at the 1985 World University Games in Kobe, Japan, when two winning U.S. relay teams of which she was a member were disqualified because she was too young to compete. Zemina, who had turned 17 on February 15, missed the January 1 cutoff by several weeks, and the error was overlooked by USA Swimming authorities.

At the 1986 Goodwill Games in Moscow, Russia, she won two gold medals as a member of winning U.S. relay team in the 4×100-meter freestyle and the 4×200-meter freestyle, as well as bronze medal in the individual 100-meter freestyle. At the 1988 Summer Olympics in Seoul, South Korea, Zemina swam for the third-place U.S. team in the preliminary heats of the women's 4×100-meter freestyle relay; together with Mary Wayte, Mitzi Kremer, Laura Walker, Dara Torres and Jill Sterkel, she received a bronze medal.

== See also ==
- List of Olympic medalists in swimming (women)
- List of University of Florida alumni
- List of University of Florida Olympians
