= 1985 Pan Pacific Swimming Championships =

International swimming competition

- Host city: Tokyo, Japan
- Date: August 15–18, 1985
- Venue: Yoyogi National Olympic Pool

The first edition of the Pan Pacific Swimming Championships, a long course (50 m) event, was held in 1985 in Tokyo, Japan after discussions between Australia, the United States, Canada and Japan. The inaugural event took place at the Yoyogi National Olympic Swimming Pool, from 15–18 August 1985.

== Results ==
=== Men's events ===
Event	Gold		Silver		Bronze	
50 m freestyle	Matt Biondi (USA)	22.73	John Sauerland (USA)	23.11	Mark Stockwell (AUS)	23.44
100 m freestyle	Matt Biondi (USA)	49.17	Mike Heath (USA)	50.43	Matthew Renshaw (AUS)	51.17
200 m freestyle	Mike Heath (USA)	1:49.29	Matt Biondi (USA)	1:50.19	Sandy Goss (CAN)	1:50.56
400 m freestyle	Justin Lemberg (AUS)	3:52.13	John Mykkanen (USA)	3:52.40	Michael Bruce McKenzie (AUS)	3:54.41
1500 m freestyle	Michael Bruce McKenzie (AUS)	15:19.55	Dan Jorgensen (USA)	15:19.74	Mike O'Brien (USA)	15:27.76
100 m backstroke	Rick Carey (USA)	56.46	Mike West (CAN)	56.60	Charlie Siroky (USA)	57.06
200 m backstroke	Rick Carey (USA)	2:01.68	Mike West (CAN)	2:01.83	Sean Murphy (CAN)	2:02.35
100 m breaststroke	John Moffet (USA)	1:02.42	Brett Stocks (AUS)	1:03.40	David Lundberg (USA)	1:03.64
200 m breaststroke	John Moffet (USA)	2:16.74	Glenn Beringen (AUS)	2:18.01	Marco Veilleux (CAN)	2:21.29
100 m butterfly	Pablo Morales (USA)	53.69	Jon Sieben (AUS)	53.78 NR	Matt Biondi (USA)	54.57
200 m butterfly	Anthony Mosse (NZL)	1:58.74 NR	Vlastimil Černý (CAN)	1:59.22	Ricardo Prado (BRA)	1:59.89
200 m individual medley	Pablo Morales (USA)	2:04.04	Rob Woodhouse (AUS)	2:05.62	Tom Ponting (CAN)	2:06.03
400 m individual medley	Ricardo Prado (BRA)	4:20.37	Matt Rankin (USA)	4:24.27	Jeff Prior (USA)	4:24.27
4×100 m freestyle relay	United States; Scott McCadam (50.08); Paul Wallace (49.51); Mike Heath (49.83); Matt Biondi (47.66)	3:17.08 WR	Canada; Sandy Goss (51.59); Blair Hicken (50.59); Vlastimil Cerny (50.25); Tom Ponting (52.06)	3:24.49 NR	Australia; Mark Stockwell; J.Pringle; Anthony McDonald; Matthew Renshaw	3:24.64
4×200 m freestyle relay	United States; Mike Heath; Matt Biondi; Duffy Dillon; Craig Oppel	7:17.63	Canada; Vlastimil Cerny (1:54.17); Jon Kelly (1:53.05); Sandy Goss (1:50.62); Scott Bergen (1:53.70)	7:31.54	Australia; Justin Lemberg; Rob Woodhouse; Anthony McDonald; Tom Stachewicz	7:35.74
4×100 m medley relay	United States; Rick Carey (56.32); John Moffet (1:01.37); Pablo Morales (52.75); Matt Biondi (47.84)	3:38.28 WR	Australia; Tom Stachewicz; Brett Stocks; Jon Sieben; Matthew Renshaw	3:45.54	Canada; Mike West (56.59); Marco Veilleux (1:04.15); Vlastimil Cerny (55.09); Blair Hicken (49.90)	3:45.83

Legend: WR – World record; NR – National record

=== Women's events ===
Event	Gold		Silver		Bronze	
50 m freestyle	Lisa Dorman (USA)	26.19	Jenna Johnson (USA)	26.47	Angela Harris (AUS)	26.57 NR
100 m freestyle	Jenna Johnson (USA)	56.36	Carrie Steinseifer (USA)	56.75	Sarah Thorpe (AUS)	57.51
200 m freestyle	Carrie Steinseifer (USA)	2:01.52	Mary Wayte (USA)	2:01.74	Michele Pearson (AUS)	2:01.87
400 m freestyle	Kim Brown (USA)	4:13.16	Diane Williams (USA)	4:15.67	Donna Procter (AUS)	4:16.07
800 m freestyle	Kim Brown (USA)	8:36.92	Tami Bruce (USA)	8:37.42	Kim Milne (CAN)	8:41.95
100 m backstroke	Betsy Mitchell (USA)	1:02.88	Andrea Hayes (USA)	1:03.20	Georgina Parkes (AUS)	1:04.62
200 m backstroke	Andrea Hayes (USA)	2:13.06	Georgina Parkes (AUS)	2:14.97	Betsy Mitchell (USA)	2:17.01
100 m breaststroke	Cindy Õunpuu (CAN)	1:10.25 NR	Hiroko Nagasaki (JPN)	1:10.57	Jenny Hau (USA)	1:10.97
200 m breaststroke	Hiroko Nagasaki (JPN)	2:29.95	Cindy Õunpuu (CAN)	2:30.73	Guylaine Cloutier (CAN)	2:33.97
100 m butterfly	Mary T. Meagher (USA)	59.16	Janet Tibbits (AUS)	1:01.12 NR	Melanie Buddemeyer (USA)	1:01.40
200 m butterfly	Mary T. Meagher (USA)	2:07.33	Erika Hansen (USA)	2:11.93	Jill Horstead (CAN) Janet Tibbits (AUS)	2:13.46
200 m individual medley	Michelle Pearson (AUS)	2:15.94=	Michelle Griglione (USA)	2:15.94=	Erika Hansen (USA)	2:19.82
400 m individual medley	Erika Hansen (USA)	4:44.45	Michelle Griglione (USA)	4:46.79	Celina Hardy (AUS)	4:53.80
4×100 m freestyle relay	United States; Carrie Steinseifer; Jenna Johnson; Michelle Griglione; Betsy Mitchell	3:45.65	Australia; Sarah Thorpe; Angela Harris; Jenny Messenger; Michelle Pearson	3:49.74	Canada	3:50.19
4×200 m freestyle relay	United States; Mary Wayte; Trina Radke; Laura Walker; Carrie Steinseifer	8:06.74 NR	Australia; Sarah Thorpe; Donna Procter; Georgina Parkes; Michelle Pearson	8:11.26 NR	Canada	8:19.87 NR
4×100 m medley relay	Canada	4:13.05	Australia; Georgina Parkes; Dimity Douglas; Janet Tibbits; Sarah Thorpe	4:13.30NR	Japan	4:17.13

== Medal table ==
Rank	Nation	Gold	Silver	Bronze	Total
1	United States (USA)	25	14	9	48
2	Australia (AUS)	3	10	12	25
3	Canada (CAN)	2	6	10	18
4	Japan (JPN)	1	1	1	3
5	Brazil (BRA)	1	0	1	2
6	New Zealand (NZL)	1	0	0	1
Totals (6 entries)		33	31	33	97
