= Swimming at the 1979 Pan American Games – Men's 200 metre breaststroke =

Men's 200 metre breaststroke at the 1979 Pan American Games
- Venue: Piscina Olimpica Del Escambron
- Dates: July 5 (preliminaries and finals)
- Competitors: from - nations

Medalists
Gold medal	Steve Lundquist	United States
Silver medal	John Simmons	United States
Bronze medal	Pablo Restrepo	Colombia

The men's 200 metre breaststroke competition of the swimming events at the 1979 Pan American Games took place on 5 July at the Piscina Olimpica Del Escambron. The last Pan American Games champion was Rick Colella of US.

This race consisted of four lengths of the pool, all in breaststroke.

== Results ==
All times are in minutes and seconds.

KEY:	q	Fastest non-qualifiers	Q	Qualified	GR	Games record	NR	National record	PB	Personal best	SB	Seasonal best

=== Heats ===
The first round was held on July 5.

Rank	Name	Nationality	Time	Notes
1	John Simmons	United States	2:23.53	Q
2	Steve Lundquist	United States	2:24.56	Q
3	Pablo Restrepo	Colombia	2:24.71	Q
4	Graham Smith	Canada	2:25.22	Q
5	Greg Wurzbach	Canada	2:26.38	Q
6	Helmut Levy	Colombia	2:27.47	Q
7	Orlando Catinchi	Puerto Rico	2:27.78	Q, NR
8	Luiz Carvalho	Brazil	2:27.78	Q
9	Andrey Aguilar	Costa Rica	2:27.91	NR
10	Glen Sochasky	Venezuela	2:28.57	NR
11	Oscar González	Mexico	2:31.28	
12	Celso Ogata	Brazil	2:31.80	
13	Jordy Masalles	Dominican Republic	2:44.86	NR
14	Jud Woolard	U.S. Virgin Islands	2:47.41	
15	Frank Torres	Puerto Rico	DQ	

=== Final ===
The final was held on July 5.

Rank	Name	Nationality	Time	Notes
1st place, gold medalist(s)	Steve Lundquist	United States	2:21.97	NR, GR
2nd place, silver medalist(s)	John Simmons	United States	2:22.45	
3rd place, bronze medalist(s)	Pablo Restrepo	Colombia	2:23.13	SA
4	Graham Smith	Canada	2:23:26	
5	Greg Wurzbach	Canada	2:25.07	
6	Helmut Levy	Colombia	2:27.02	
7	Orlando Catinchi	Puerto Rico	2:28.08	
8	Luiz Carvalho	Brazil	2:28.94	
