= Woolard =

Woolard is a surname. Notable people with the surname include:

- Caroline Woolard (born 1984), American artist
- Cathy Woolard (born 1957), American politician
- Collier Woolard (born 1968), United States Virgin Islands swimmer
- Daniel Woolard (born 1984), American soccer player
- Edgar S. Woolard Jr. (1934–2023), American businessman
- Edgar W. Woolard (1899–1978), American meteorologist
- Harrell Woolard (born 1963), United States Virgin Islands swimmer
- Jamal Woolard (born 1975), American actor and rapper
- Kathryn Woolard (born 1950), American anthropologist
- Larry D. Woolard (born 1941), American politician
