= Swimming at the 1979 Pan American Games – Men's 100 metre breaststroke =

Men's 100 metre breaststroke at the 1979 Pan American Games
- Venue: Piscina Olimpica Del Escambron
- Dates: July 2 (preliminaries and finals)
- Competitors: 19 from - nations

Medalists
Gold medal	Steve Lundquist	United States
Silver medal	Greg Winchell	United States
Bronze medal	Graham Smith	Canada

The men's 100 metre breaststroke competition of the swimming events at the 1979 Pan American Games took place on 2 July at the Piscina Olimpica Del Escambron. The last Pan American Games champion was Rick Colella of the US.

This race consisted of two lengths of the pool, both lengths being in breaststroke.

== Results ==
All times shown are in minutes and seconds.

KEY:	q	Fastest non-qualifiers	Q	Qualified	GR	Games record	NR	National record	PB	Personal best	SB	Seasonal best

=== Heats ===
The first round was held on July 2.

Rank	Name	Nationality	Time	Notes
1	Greg Winchell	United States	1:05.42	Q
2	Steve Lundquist	United States	1:05.98	Q
3	Graham Smith	Canada	1:06.78	Q
4	Pablo Restrepo	Colombia	1:06.85	Q
5	Greg Wurzbach	Canada	1:07.00	Q
6	Helmut Levy	Colombia	1:07.20	Q
7	Miguel Santiesteban	Mexico	1:07.21	Q
8	Glen Sochasky	Venezuela	1:07.64	Q, NR
9	Luiz Carvalho	Brazil	1:07.83	
10	Orlando Catinchi	Puerto Rico	1:08.27	NR
11	Oscar González	Mexico	1:09.63	
12	Andres Aguilar	Costa Rica	1:09.95	NR
13	Celso Ogata	Brazil	1:10.03	
14	Jorge Aguilera	Puerto Rico	1:12.84	
15	Victor Ruberry	Bermuda	1:12.92	
16	David Gordon	U.S. Virgin Islands	1:13.86	NR
17	Jordy Masalles	Dominican Republic	1:15.21	NR
18	M.Lizarzalde	Venezuela	1:16.51	
19	Roberto Ledesma	Ecuador	1:18.06	

=== Final ===
The final was held on July 2.

Rank	Name	Nationality	Time	Notes
1st place, gold medalist(s)	Steve Lundquist	United States	1:03.82	NR, GR
2nd place, silver medalist(s)	Greg Winchell	United States	1:04.76	
3rd place, bronze medalist(s)	Graham Smith	Canada	1:05.66	
4	Pablo Restrepo	Colombia	1:06:00	NR
5	Greg Wurzbach	Canada	1:06.64	
6	Miguel Santiesteban	Mexico	1:06.72	NR
7	Helmut Levy	Colombia	1:07.54	
8	Glen Sochasky	Venezuela	1:08.35	
