= Virgin Islands at the 1984 Summer Olympics =

- Flag of the United States Virgin Islands
- IOC code: ISV
- NOC: Virgin Islands Olympic Committee

in Los Angeles
- Competitors: 29 in 7 sports
- Flag bearer: Jodie Lawaetz
- Medals: Gold 0 Silver 0 Bronze 0 Total 0

Summer Olympics appearances (overview)
- 1968; 1972; 1976; 1980; 1984; 1988; 1992; 1996; 2000; 2004; 2008; 2012; 2016; 2020; 2024

The United States Virgin Islands competed at the 1984 Summer Olympics in Los Angeles, United States. The nation returned to the Summer Games after participating in the American-led boycott of the 1980 Summer Olympics. 29 competitors, 26 men and 3 women, took part in 31 events in 7 sports.

== Athletics ==
Men's Marathon

- Marlon Williams — 2:46:50 (→ 75th place)

Men's Pole Vault

- John Morrisette

- Qualifying Round — 5.20m (→ did not advance)

== Fencing ==
Four fencers, three men and one woman, represented the Virgin Islands in 1984.

Men's foil

- Julito Francis
- James Kreglo

Men's épée

- James Kerr

Men's sabre

- James Kreglo

Women's foil

- Alayna Snell

== Sailing ==
Men

Athlete	Event	Race							Net points	Final rank
Athlete	Event	1	2	3	4	5	6	7	Net points	Final rank
Kenneth C. Klein	Windglider	14	8	3	8	~~16~~	12	16	93.7	13

Open

Athlete	Event	Race							Net points	Final rank
Athlete	Event	1	2	3	4	5	6	7	Net points	Final rank
Peter Holmberg	Finn	11	~~19~~	3	15	8	7	10	86.7	11
Erik Zucker; Trace Tervo	470	24	26	~~27~~	25	18	23	22	174.0	26
John F. Foster; John Foster	Star	14	17	~~RET~~	15	16	15	17	130.0	18
Jean Braure; Kirk Grybowski; Marlon Singh	Soling	19	~~22~~	22	22	22	19	20	160.0	22

== Swimming ==
Men's 100m Freestyle

- Erik Rosskopf

- Heat — 54.80 (→ did not advance, 47th place)

- Collier Woolard

- Heat — 55.67 (→ did not advance, 53rd place)

Men's 200m Freestyle

- Scott Newkirk

- Heat — 1:57.74 (→ did not advance, 41st place)

- Erik Rosskopf

- Heat — 2:02.04 (→ did not advance, 45th place)

Men's 400m Freestyle

- Scott Newkirk

- Heat — 4:13.11 (→ did not advance, 33rd place)

Men's 1500m Freestyle

- Scott Newkirk

- Heat — 16:50.55 (→ did not advance, 26th place)

Men's 100m Backstroke

- Erik Rosskopf

- Heat — 1:03.82 (→ did not advance, 37th place)

- Collier Woolard

- Heat — 1:06.86 (→ did not advance, 41st place)

Men's 100m Breaststroke

- Harrell Woolard

- Heat — 1:11.17 (→ did not advance, 45th place)

- Brian Farlow

- Heat — 1:11.27 (→ did not advance, 46th place)

Men's 200m Breaststroke

- Brian Farlow

- Heat — 2:37.87 (→ did not advance, 43rd place)

- Harrell Woolard

- Heat — 2:45.68 (→ did not advance, 44th place)

Men's 200m Individual Medley

- Brian Farlow

- Heat — 2:20.53 (→ did not advance, 35th place)

- Harrell Woolard

- Heat — 2:27.51 (→ did not advance, 40th place)

Men's 400m Individual Medley

- Scott Newkirk

- Heat — 4:48.15 (→ did not advance, 17th place)

Men's 4 × 100 m Freestyle Relay

- Erik Rosskopf, Brian Farlow, Collier Woolard, and Scott Newkirk

- Heat — 3:43.49 (→ did not advance, 20th place)

Men's 4 × 100 m Medley Relay

- Erik Rosskopf, Harrell Woolard, Scott Newkirk, and Collier Woolard

- Heat — 4:16.18 (→ did not advance, 18th place)

Women's 100m Freestyle

- Shelley Cramer

- Heat — 1:00.65 (→ did not advance, 29th place)

Women's 200m Butterfly

- Shelley Cramer

- Heat — 2:22.39 (→ did not advance, 24th place)

- Jodie Lawaetz

- Heat — 2:25.58 (→ did not advance, 29th place)
