= Matt Gribble =

American swimmer (1962–2004)

- In University of Miami sweats, circa 1982

Personal information
- Full name: Matthew Owen Gribble
- Nickname: "Matt"
- National team: United States
- Born: March 28, 1962 Houston, Texas, U.S.
- Died: March 21, 2004 (aged 41) Miami, Florida, U.S.
- Height: 5 ft 10 1/2 in (1.8 m)
- Weight: 177 lb (80 kg)

Sport
- Sport: Swimming
- Strokes: Butterfly, freestyle
- Club: Hurricane Swim Club; Miami, Florida
- College team: University of Miami '80-'84
- Coach: Bill Diaz, Charlie Hodgson; University of Miami
Medal record
Men's swimming
Representing the United States
World Championships (LC)
Gold medal – first place	1982 Guayaquil	100 m butterfly
Gold medal – first place	1982 Guayaquil	4×100 m medley
Pan American Games
Gold medal – first place	1983 Caracas	100 m butterfly
Gold medal – first place	1983 Caracas	4×100 m freestyle
Gold medal – first place	1983 Caracas	4×100 m medley

Matthew Owen Gribble (March 28, 1962 – March 21, 2004) was an American high school and college competitive swimmer, 1982 World Aquatics champion, two-time U.S. Olympic team member, and an August 1983 world record-holder in the 100-meter butterfly. He also swam on a 4x100 U.S. medley relay team at the August 1982 World Aquatics championships that set a world record of 3:40.84.

== Early swimming ==
Matt was born in Houston, Texas on March 28, 1962, as the youngest child of John and Barbara Gribble in an affluent swimming family where all four children earned college swimming scholarships to major universities. Gribble began swimming around the age of seven, taking a two-year break when he reached 14, and resuming serious high school competition at 16 which included training year round. Though his college coach Bill Diaz characterized him as a consistently hard worker, he occasionally missed practices at several points in his long fourteen-year career as a competitive swimmer. When he was only 8, around 1970 in Houston, his coach Dave Wilday told Gribble's parents he was the family's best swimmer, and had what it took to be an Olympian some day. When he was 12, the Gribbles moved from Houston to Perrine, Florida, ten miles from the University of Miami.

== Miami Palmetto Senior High swimming ==
He graduated Florida's Miami Palmetto Senior High School, in 1980 and was an outstanding member of their swim team. As an upperclassman competing for Miami Palmetto High at the Florida State Championships in May, 1980, he won the 100-yard butterfly event in 49.25, and the 100-yard freestyle in 46.01, in back to back events with little rest though Miami Palmetto placed eighth in the meet.

In April 1979, though not a leader in statewide competition, the Miami Palmetto boys team was rated first in Florida's Dade County with an undefeated 14–0 record, and Gribble was on the Dade County Honor roll with a first place 1:57.9 in the 200 individual medley, a first place 51.88 in the 100 butterfly, and a second in the 100 backstroke with a 56.5. Gribble also played water polo for Miami Palmetto and was recognized for his performance in mid-October 1979.

In his Senior year at Miami Palmetto, in April 1980, Gribble came in third in the 100-meter butterfly at the U.S. Nationals, and gained considerable recognition. Then, in the Olympic trials in July 1980, he came in second in the event to University of Texas swimmer William Paulus, suddenly placing Gribble in the national spotlight.

== University of Miami ==
He attended the University of Miami, majoring in marketing, and swam for the Miami Hurricanes swimming and diving team under Head Coach Bill Diaz and former Dartmouth swimmer and Assistant Coach Charlie Hodgson between 1980 and 1984. While swimming for Miami, he won two NCAA titles, and set four school records including the school mark in the 100-meter butterfly that still stands today. One of his NCAA titles came in late March 1983 when he took first place in the 100-meter Butterfly at the NCAA Championships in Indianapolis. During his exceptional career at Miami, he held school records in the 100 and 200-yard freestyle, and in his signature stroke, the 100-yard and 200-yard butterfly. He was a three-time all American during his swimming career at U. of Miami. As a Senior at Miami in June 1983, Gribble trained for the Olympics with the Hurricanes Swim Club in the off-season taking two practices a day and averaging 50–55 miles a week. The Hurricane Swim Club met at the University of Miami Pool and had some of the same coaches as the University of Miami Swim team.

On March 23, 1984, at the NCAA Championships in Cleveland, though defending champion, Gribble tied for second place with a 48.02 in the 100 fly and was upset by Pablo Morales who broke the standing NCAA record in the event with a 47.02.

Though an exceedingly hard worker who had been training as an elite swimmer for around eight years prior to the Olympics, Gribble was described by his Hurricane Swim Club Coach Charlie Hodgson as occasionally missing one of his two daily workouts or missing an occasional interview. He was characterized by teammates as "totally laid back and always congratulating his competitors", and described as "a real shy guy" and not particularly talkative during meets.

== 1982 World Aquatics medals ==
He won two gold medals in the 1982 World Aquatics Championships in Guayaquil, Ecuador, including one in the 100-meter butterfly with a meet record 53.98 which was very close to the World Record. His U.S. relay team of Rick Carey, Steve Lundquist, himself, and Rowdy Gaines also won the 4x100 meter medley relay in a world record time of 3:40.84. With a strong showing by Gribble, and the American team, and the diving medals won by Miami teammate Greg Louganis, the U.S. won the international competition against rivals East Germany and the Soviet Union.

== August 1983 100m butterfly world record ==
Finally ending his long pursuit of the record, on August 6, 1983, Gribble took first in the 100-meter butterfly in the preliminaries at the Phillips66/United States Long Course Swimming Championships (National Championships) in Clovis setting a world record time of 53.44. His new record shaved nearly a full .4 of a second off childhood rival William Paulus's former world record of 53.81, a considerable margin in elite world competition. Most considered Paulus's record a fluke, as Gribble had beaten Paulus in the 100-meter butterfly six of the last seven times they had met. Gribble's win in the finals was impressive, though it was .2 seconds slower than his World Record in the preliminaries. Gribble admitted, "I was swimming for the record in the prelims and swimming to win tonight", but noted he was slightly disappointed to have swum slightly slower in the finals. In late July 1983, based on his steady performance in the 100-meter butterfly and her belief that he would soon break the world record in the event, Christine Brennan of the Miami Herald wrote that Gribble "should and probably will win an Olympic Gold Medal in 1984."

== August 1983 Pan Am games ==
In one of his greatest achievements in international competition on August 18, 1983, Gribble won three gold medals at the 1983 Pan American Games in Caracas, Venezuela, where he teamed with backstroker Rick Carey, breaststroker Steve Lundquist, and freestyler Rowdy Gaines, setting a world record in the 400-meter medley relay of 3:40.22. The record remains as the only time in swimming history when each member of a world record-setting medley relay held the 100 meter world record in their respective stroke. Gribble took a gold medal in the 100-meter butterfly in meet record time of 54.84 on August 18, 1983. With his solid 100-meter butterfly time at World's and his 100-meter butterfly world record at Nationals less than two weeks earlier on August 6, Gribble remained a leading contender in the event for the 1984 Olympics. Not the world's fastest freestyler, his respectable 50.71 in the 4x100 freestyle relay helped anchor swimmer Rowdy Gaines touch first for the American team's gold medal, but Gribble's time was not the team's fastest.

== 1984 U.S. Olympic competitor ==
He was a member of the U.S. Olympic teams in 1980 and 1984. As America boycotted the 1980 Moscow Olympics during President Jimmy Carter's term, Gribble and the American team did not attend. In 1983, Gribble had trained stringently for the Olympics primarily with University of Miami Assistant Coach Charlie Hodgson, who had also coached Gribble with the Hurricane Swim Club for nine years, since around 1974. With a World Record time, and strong performance, prior to the 1984 Los Angeles Olympics, Gribble was considered a favorite. However, he injured his back bowling around March 1984, in an injury described as causing "severe back spasms" prior to that year's 100-meter butterfly Olympic trials on June 26, 1984, in Indianapolis and was unable to do long practices nor do sprint work. He did receive some relief from medical treatment and was able to complete shorter practices, after being diagnosed with a "neurological imbalance" and a calcium deficiency. Still hoping for the best, he surprised many by managing a second place against Pablo Morales and qualified in the Indianapolis trials, despite Morales setting a new World Record.

As a result of his injury, Gribble swam the 16th fastest time with a 55.39 in the Olympic preliminaries in Los Angeles, and could not match his 1983 world record time which would have resulted in a bronze medal. His time placed him only .53 seconds behind the bronze medal winner Glen Buchannon from Australia. He did not make the cut for the eight finalists, as his injury, and a highly competitive field, with the top seven finalists setting national records or personal bests, hindered Gribble's chances.

== Later life ==
After his competitive swimming career ended, Gribble was an accountant for Hasbro and owned a number of tax companies.

On March 21, 2004, at age 41, Gribble died in a head-on automobile accident in Southwest Miami-Dade County near The Falls Shopping Center between SW 92nd and S. Dixie Highway in Miami. A driver veered over the center lane and hit his car head-on. His son Trey was hospitalized but was in stable condition and recovered. He was survived by mother and father John and Barbara, brothers David and Mark, sister Lenore, all from Houston where he was born. Other survivors included his son Trey Hern and girlfriend Jeanne Castro of Miami. He is buried at Caballero Rivero Woodlawn North Park Cemetery and Mausoleum in Miami.

== Honors ==
In 1997, he was inducted into the University of Miami Sports Hall of Fame. As a result of his 1983 World Record time of 53.44 in the 100-meter Butterfly, he was nominated for the Swimmer of the Year Award around October 1983. As a serious 1984 Olympic gold medal prospect in the 100-meter butterfly, Gribble was filmed with his college girlfriend Patty Anderson in March 1984, for ABC's TV program Up Close and Personal, and was also featured in the June issue of Life Magazine. When he won his first NCAA title as a Miami Sophomore, his picture was painted on a wall at the University of Miami with teammates, Olympic Diver Greg Louganis and swimmers Jesse Vassallo and David Wilkie. At the time of his death in 2004, the University of Miami Men's Swim Team had been disbanded.

After his death, a 50-yard sprint "Legends Race" to honor Gribble, and benefit Special Olympics was held on Saturday afternoon, May 22, 2004, at the Miami Rowing Club Pool on Rickenbacker Causeway. Legendary swimmers Mark Spitz, Miami University teammates Jesse Vassallo & Kurt Wienants, and Felope Munoz, Tim McKee, and Robert Strauss competed. An annual Matt Gribble Invitational swim tournament at the University of Miami in Coral Gables has also been held in his honor.

In a tribute in 2005, the corner of SW 117th Ave. and 128 St. in Miami was renamed Matthew O. Gribble Street.

== See also ==
- List of World Aquatics Championships medalists in swimming (men)
- World record progression 100 metres butterfly
- World record progression 4 × 100 metres medley relay

Records
Preceded by William Paulus	Men's 100-meter butterfly world record-holder (long course); August 6, 1983 – June 26, 1984	Succeeded by Pablo Morales
