= Pablo Morales =

American swimmer (born 1964)

Personal information
- Full name: Pedro Pablo Morales Jr.
- National team: United States
- Born: December 5, 1964 (age 61) Chicago, Illinois, U.S.
- Height: 6 ft 2 in (1.88 m)
- Weight: 187 lb (85 kg)

Sport
- Sport: Swimming
- Strokes: Butterfly, freestyle
- College team: Stanford University
Medal record
Men's swimming
Representing the United States
Olympic Games
Gold medal – first place	1984 Los Angeles	4x100 m medley
Gold medal – first place	1992 Barcelona	100 m butterfly
Gold medal – first place	1992 Barcelona	4x100 m medley
Silver medal – second place	1984 Los Angeles	100 m butterfly
Silver medal – second place	1984 Los Angeles	200 m medley
World Championships (LC)
Gold medal – first place	1986 Madrid	100 m butterfly
Gold medal – first place	1986 Madrid	4x100 m medley
Pan Pacific Championships
Gold medal – first place	1985 Tokyo	100 m butterfly
Gold medal – first place	1985 Tokyo	200 m medley
Gold medal – first place	1985 Tokyo	4x100 m medley
Gold medal – first place	1987 Brisbane	100 m butterfly
Gold medal – first place	1987 Brisbane	4x100 m medley
Gold medal – first place	1989 Tokyo	4x100 m medley
Bronze medal – third place	1987 Brisbane	200 m medley
Pan American Games
Silver medal – second place	1983 Caracas	100 m butterfly

Pedro Pablo Morales Jr. (born December 5, 1964) is an American former competitive swimmer. He set world records in the 100-meter butterfly in 1984 and 1986. He was the 100-meter butterfly gold medalist at the 1992 Olympic Games, as well as winning 4 × 100 meter medley relay gold medals at both the 1984 and 1992 Olympic Games. He also won 100-meter butterfly and 4 × 100 meter medley relay gold medals at the 1986 World Championships.

== Biography ==
Morales attended Bellarmine College Preparatory, in San Jose, California, and trained under the supervision of Larry Rogers.

Morales won a relay gold and two silver medals swimming butterfly at the 1984 Olympics in Los Angeles and set the world record in the 100-meter butterfly at the US Olympic Trials that year with a time of 53.38 seconds, breaking the former record of American Olympic teammate Matt Gribble, who finished second. At the trials, Morales also set relay records with teammates Rick Carey, Steve Lundquist and Rowdy Gaines. After losing the 100-meter butterfly world record to German swimmer Michael Gross in 1984, he regained it in 1986 with a swim of 52.84 seconds. This record stood until 1995.

In 1988, on the heels of a record 11th National Collegiate Athletic Association (NCAA) individual championship at Stanford University, Morales surprisingly failed to qualify for the 1988 Olympics.

After briefly retiring from the sport to pursue a JD degree at Cornell Law School in Ithaca, New York, Morales returned to swimming and qualified for the 1992 Olympics in Barcelona, where he was the US team captain and captured gold in the 100-meter butterfly.

== Coaching career ==
Since 2001, Morales is the current head women's swimming and diving coach at the University of Nebraska. He was previously the head women's swimming and diving coach at San Jose State from 1998 to July 2001.

== See also ==
- List of members of the International Swimming Hall of Fame
- List of multiple Olympic gold medalists
- List of notable Cuban-Americans
- List of Olympic medalists in swimming (men)
- List of Stanford University people
- List of World Aquatics Championships medalists in swimming (men)
- World record progression 100 metres butterfly
- World record progression 4 × 100 metres medley relay

Records
Preceded by Matt Gribble	Men's 100-meter butterfly world record-holder (long course); June 26, 1984 – July 30, 1984	Succeeded by Michael Gross
Preceded by Michael Gross	Men's 100-meter butterfly world record-holder (long course); June 23, 1986 – August 23, 1995	Succeeded by Denis Pankratov
