= Metropolitan Swimming =

- Sport: Swimming
- No. of teams: 82
- Country: United States

Metropolitan Swimming (MR) is the governing body for competitive swimming in the New York Metropolitan Area. It is an LSC member of USA Swimming and the Eastern Zone. Most of the athletes who compete in Metro-sponsored swim meets are youths under the age of 18. However, there are also opportunities for older members of the swimming community to compete.

== Location ==
Metro is one of the 59 sub-divided areas by the National Governing Board, which is USA Swimming. The area that Metro covers is New York City, Nassau, Suffolk, Westchester, Rockland, Dutchess, Orange, Putnam, and Sullivan Counties in New York State.

== Athlete Members ==
Nearly 10,000 individuals are registered Metro athlete members, one of the largest in all areas of USA Swimming. These athletes compete across approximately 75 different swim clubs in about as many facilities. The level of competition across the clubs varies greatly, from recreational swimming to Olympians. Some of the notable athletes who have come from Metro include Cristina Teuscher, Jenny Thompson, Julia Smit, Lia Neal, Philip Scholz, and Rick Carey.

== Club Members ==
There are 75 swim teams registered as members of Metropolitan Swimming.

== Competitions and Events ==
Metro sanctions about 115 swimming competitions per year. Most of these are competed in Short Course Yards, then Long Course Meters, and one Open Water Championship.

=== Silver Championship ===
The 2014 Metro Silver Championships are held on March 1 to March 3, 2014 at various locations depending on Metro section (Northern, Central, Southern, etc.). Junior Olympic cuts can be achieved here, but awards are given to only Silver swimmers and JO qualifiers will not receive awards. Any faster swimmer faster than the JO or as fast are not permitted.

=== Junior Metropolitan Championships (formerly Age Group Championships and Junior Olympics) ===
The 2014 Metropolitan Junior Olympics will stretch across the entire MR LSC or area. All swimmers from Metro are allowed to attend within the Metropolitan LSC.This meet is considered one of the top meets for the 10 and under and 11-12 age groups. A notable performance at the recent Junior Olympics Championships was that of Nick Torres, who swept all of the individual events in the 11-12 age group. Also, the dominating Team Suffolk 11-12 boys 400 medley relay broke a Metropolitan Record. On that relay was Justin Meyn, Nikolas Daly, Kabir Randhawa, and Dylan Champagne. The Metropolitan record for the 13-14 boys 400 freestyle relay was also broken by Asphalt Green Unified Aquatics. The swimmers were Tim Seliger, Luca Fong, Will Rankin, and Bruce Qian.

=== Zone Team Qualifier ===
The 2013 Zone Team Qualifier takes place at Lehman College, Bronx and will invite all or most Metropolitan teams. Cuts are faster than Junior Olympics and Zone Qualifier (ZQ) times must be achieved before. The Zone Team is decided by top swimmers of each event, and maximum speed cuts for 13 and over are looked over.

=== Eastern Zone Championship ===
Swimmers on the Metropolitan Zone Team compete among other Eastern Zone LSCs, and will be held this year in Buffalo, NY

=== Senior Metropolitan Championship ===
The Senior Metropolitan (Sr Mets) Championships is an open meet, and swimmers of any age and speed are allowed to attend. It is held this season in SCY at Lehman College APEX, Bronx on February 21 to February 23, 2013 and includes open relays.

== Metro Zone Team ==
The Metropolitan Zone Team represents Metropolitan Swimming at the Eastern Zone Championships. The co-head coaches are Edgar Perez and John Yearwood. Selection for the short course Metro Zone team is based on the Metropolitan Zone Team Qualifier meet held at Lehman College in Bronx, NY. At this meet, the top three 9-10 and 11-12 swimmers in each event qualify for the Metro Zone team. The top two 13-14 and 15-18 swimmers in each event also qualify for the Metro Zone team. Selection for the long course Eastern Zone Championships is based on a qualifying time.

== Governance ==
The Metro LSC is run by its board of directors, elected by the House of Delegates.
