= Glenn Beringen =

Australian international swimming coach and former athlete

Personal information
- Full name: Glenn Stuart Beringen
- National team: Australia
- Born: 16 September 1964 (age 61) Adelaide, South Australia
- Height: 1.85 m (6 ft 1 in)
- Weight: 72 kg (159 lb)

Sport
- Sport: Swimming
- Strokes: Breaststroke
Medal record
Men's swimming
Representing Australia
Olympic Games
| Silver medal – second place | 1984 Los Angeles | 200 m breaststroke |
Commonwealth Games
| Silver medal – second place | 1982 Brisbane | 200 m breaststroke |
Pan Pacific Games
| Silver medal – second place | 1985 Tokyo | 200 m breaststroke |

Glenn Stuart Beringen (born 16 September 1964) is an Australian international swimming coach and former athlete. He won a silver medal for breaststroke at the 1984 Summer Olympics and 1982 Commonwealth Games.

== Major competitions ==
At the 1982 Commonwealth Games in Brisbane, Beringen won the silver medal in the 200-metre men's breaststroke final, 2.81 seconds behind the winner Victor Davis. At the 1984 Los Angeles Olympics, Beringen won a silver medal in the 200-metre breaststroke event, again as runner-up to Davis. Beringen also competed in the heats of the 200-metre individual medley, but did not reach the final. Beringen held an Australian Institute of Sport swimming scholarship 1982–1983.

== Coach ==
Beringen later became a coach, beginning at the South Australian Sports Institute from 1991 until 2002, before working at the Australian Institute of Sport (AIS) until 2004. Among the athletes he trained at the AIS were Olympic gold medallists Petria Thomas and Sarah Ryan. Athletes coached by Beringen achieved three individual short course world records, two short course and long course relay world records.

Glenn worked for Swim South Australia in Adelaide as coach and promoter of the sport. He then moved to Townsville, where he coached the Kokoda Spirit swimming team, a partnership between Townsville Grammar School and Kokoda Memorial Pool. He was head coach for the Australian team at the 2013 FINA World Junior Swimming Championships and 2014 Junior Pan Pacific Championships. From April 2015 he took up a position as coach for the Australian swimming team in preparation for the 2018 Commonwealth Games, due to be held in Queensland, Australia and as head coach for the Australian team at the 2015 Commonwealth Youth Games.

== See also ==
- List of Olympic medalists in swimming (men)

== Bibliography ==
- Andrews, Malcolm (2000). Australia at the Olympic Games. Sydney, New South Wales: ABC Books. pp. 140–146. ISBN 0-7333-0884-8.
