= Marco Del Prete =

Italian swimmer

Personal information
- Nationality: Italian
- Born: 17 August 1965 (age 60) Rome, Italy

Sport
- Sport: Swimming

Marco Del Prete (born 17 August 1965) is an Italian swimmer. He competed in the men's 200 metre breaststroke at the 1984 Summer Olympics.
