= Sabina Schulze =

East German swimmer (born 1972)

Personal information
- Born: 19 March 1972 (age 54) Leipzig, East Germany
- Height: 1.80 m (5 ft 11 in)
- Weight: 66 kg (146 lb)

Sport
- Sport: Swimming
- Club: SC DHfK, Leipzig, SC Empor Rostock
Medal record
Representing East Germany
Olympic Games
Gold medal – first place	1988 Seoul	4×100 m freestyle
World Championships
Gold medal – first place	1986 Madrid	4×100 m freestyle

Sabina Schulze (born 19 March 1972) is a retired German swimmer who won a gold medal in the 4 × 100 m freestyle relay at the 1986 World Aquatics Championships, setting a new world record. Two years later she won a gold medal in the same event at the 1988 Summer Olympics.

Schulze was born in a family of track and field athletes. Her father Jens Schulze and mother Karin Rüger competed in high jump, and the mother took part in the 1964 and 1968 Olympics. Her brother Thomas specialized in shot put, but Sabina and another brother Michael went into swimming. After marriage she changed her last name to Kessler.
