= Ken Fitzpatrick =

Canadian swimmer (born 1963)

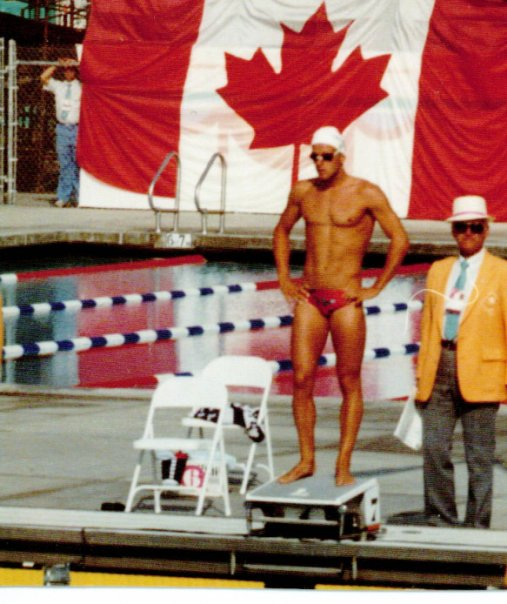

Personal information
- Full name: Kenneth Fitzpatrick
- Nickname: "Ken"
- National team: Canada
- Born: January 12, 1963 (age 63) Ottawa, Ontario
- Height: 1.75 m (5 ft 9 in)
- Weight: 64 kg (141 lb)

Sport
- Sport: Swimming
- Strokes: Breaststroke
- Club: London Aquatic Club

Kenneth Fitzpatrick (born January 12, 1963) is a former breaststroke swimmer from Canada. He was born in Ottawa, Ontario. Fitzpatrick competed for his native country at the 1984 Summer Olympics in Los Angeles, California. There he finished in fifth place in the event final of the men's 200-metre breaststroke, more than five seconds behind winning Canadian teammate Victor Davis, clocking 2:18.86.

As of 2012, Fitzpatrick was the head coach of the London Silver Dolphins , and an associate coach with the University of Western Ontario varsity swim team in London, Ontario.

In 2019 Ken assumed the position of Head Coach for the Owen Sound Aquatic Club.
