= John Moffet (swimmer) =

American swimmer (born 1964)

John Moffet OLY
Personal information
- Full name: John Clifford Moffet
- National team: United States
- Born: July 27, 1964 (age 62) Banning, California, U.S.
- Height: 6 ft 1 in (1.85 m)
- Weight: 185 lb (84 kg)

Sport
- Sport: Swimming
- Strokes: Breaststroke
- College team: Stanford University
Medal record
Men's swimming
Representing the United States
World Championships (LC)
| Bronze medal – third place | 1982 Guayaquil | 100 m Breaststroke |
| Bronze medal – third place | 1982 Guayaquil | 200 m Breaststroke |
Pan American Games
| Silver medal – second place | 1983 Caracas | 100 m breaststroke |
Pan Pacific Championships
| Gold medal – first place | 1985 Tokyo | 100 m Breaststroke |
| Gold medal – first place | 1985 Tokyo | 200 m Breaststroke |
| Gold medal – first place | 1985 Tokyo | 4×100 m Medley |
Summer Universiade
| Gold medal – first place | 1985 Kobe | 100 m Breaststroke |
| Gold medal – first place | 1985 Kobe | 200 m Breaststroke |
| Gold medal – first place | 1985 Kobe | 4×100 m Medley |

John Clifford Moffet (born July 27, 1964) is an American former swimmer who competed at the 1984 Summer Olympics in Los Angeles, California, having also been selected for the 1980 Summer Olympics that were ultimately boycotted by the United States. At the 1984 Olympics, he finished fifth in the final of the men's 100-meter breaststroke event. In 1985 he won three gold medals at both the Pan Pacific Swimming Championships and the Summer Universiade. In 1986, he concluded his collegiate career, after winning five NCAA Division 1 Championships, and moved into the entertainment industry. As a television producer he is a three-time Primetime Emmy Award winner for The Amazing Race.

== Early life ==
Moffet was born in Banning, California. He took up swimming at the age of 11 at the Mount Baldy Swim Club, but moved to Newport Beach prior to starting high school, where he attended Newport Harbor High School. He joined the local Beach Swim Club and won a silver medal in the 200 metres breastroke at the 1980 United States Swimming National Championships. This led to his selection to represent the United States at the 1980 Summer Olympics in Moscow, but he was prevented from attending due to the country's boycott of the Games. In lieu of competing, the team was awarded the Congressional Gold Medal.

== Swimming career ==
In 1981, Moffet set a national high school record of 55.24 in the 100 yards breaststroke and finished fourth in that event at the national championships, also taking bronze in the 200 metres breaststroke. The following year, he won bronze medals in both of those events at the 1982 World Aquatics Championships and began attending Stanford University. He also swam in the heats of the gold medal-winning 4×100 metres medley relay. He set a Pan American Games record in the qualifying rounds of the 100 metres breaststroke at the 1983 edition, but ultimately finished second to his compatriot Steve Lundquist. He competed in that event at the 1984 Summer Olympics and set an Olympic record of 1:02.16 in the heats, despite injuring his thigh muscle during the race. This injury led him to finish fifth in the final and not start in the 200 metres breaststroke, in which he was also entered. That same year, he won those events at the National Collegiate Athletic Association (NCAA) Championships and held the world record in the 100 metres breaststroke from June 25 until July 29.

In 1985, Moffet won gold medals in the 100 and 200 metres breaststroke events, as well as the 4×100 metres medley relay, at the Pan Pacific Swimming Championships, Summer Universiade, and NCAA Championships, the latter of which helped earn Stanford its first overall Division 1 swimming championship since 1967. The American team's Pan Pacific relay time set a world record that lasted until September 25, 1988. In his final year at Stanford, 1986, he helped the university capture a second consecutive NCAA Division 1 championship and took the 200 metres breaststroke title, giving him five NCAA Division titles overall. During his senior year, he received the NCAA's Today's Top VI Award (now Today's Top 10 Award) as one of the top six student athletes in the country. He was inducted into the Stanford Athletics Hall of Fame in 1998 and in 2016 was selected as part of the Pac-12 Conference Men's Swimming and Diving All-Century Team.

== Later career ==
Upon graduation, Moffet elected to pursue a career in the entertainment industry and has produced television for multiple networks in the United States. Among his programming, he produced seven seasons of The Amazing Race, for which he won three Emmy Awards as supervising producer from 2005 through 2007.

Moffet has also remained active in the realm of sport. As of 2020, he was serving on the Los Angeles Sports Council Board of Directors, as President of the Southern California Olympians & Paralympians Association, and on the board of the Trident Swim Foundation. He was previously an advisor to the Los Angeles bid committee for the 2028 Summer Olympics.

== See also ==
- List of Stanford University people
- List of World Aquatics Championships medalists in swimming (men)
- World record progression 100 metres breaststroke
- World record progression 4 × 100 metres medley relay

Records
| Preceded by Steve Lundquist | Men's 100-meter breaststroke world record-holder (long course); June 25, 1984 – July 29, 1984 | Succeeded by Steve Lundquist |
| Preceded by Rick Carey; Steve Lundquist; Pablo Morales; Rowdy Gaines | Men's 400-meter medley relay world record-holder (long course); August 18, 1985 – September 25, 1988 | Succeeded by David Berkoff; Rick Schroeder; Matt Biondi; Chris Jacobs |
