= Mary Wayte =

American swimmer (born 1965)

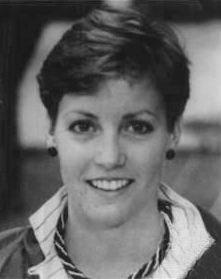
- Wayte in 1984

Personal information
- Full name: Mary Alice Wayte
- National team: United States
- Born: March 25, 1965 (age 61) Mercer Island, Washington, U.S.
- Height: 5 ft 9 in (1.75 m)
- Weight: 128 lb (58 kg)

Sport
- Sport: Swimming
- Strokes: Freestyle, individual medley
- Club: Chinook Aquatic Club
- College team: University of Florida
- Coach: Randy Reese; U Florida; Jack Ridley; Chinook SC
Medal record
Event	1st	2nd	3rd
Olympic Games	2	1	1
World Championships (LC)	0	2	0
Pan American Games	1	1	0
Pan Pacific Championships	1	1	0
Total	4	5	1
Event	1st	2nd	3rd
200 m Freestyle (OG/WC)	1	0	0
4 × 100 m medley relay (OG/WC)	0	1	0
4 × 100 metre freestyle relay (OG/WC)	1	1	1
4 × 200 metre freestyle relay (OG/WC)	0	1	0
Total	2	3	1
Women's swimming
Representing United States
Olympic Games
Gold medal – first place	1984 Los Angeles	200 m freestyle
Gold medal – first place	1984 Los Angeles	4×100 m freestyle
Silver medal – second place	1988 Seoul	4×100 m medley
Bronze medal – third place	1988 Seoul	4×100 m freestyle
World Championships (LC)
Silver medal – second place	1986 Madrid	4×100 m freestyle
Silver medal – second place	1986 Madrid	4×200 m freestyle
Pan American Games
Gold medal – first place	1983 Caracas	4×100 m freestyle
Silver medal – second place	1983 Caracas	200 m freestyle
Pan Pacific Championships
Gold medal – first place	1985 Tokyo	4×200 m freestyle
Silver medal – second place	1985 Tokyo	200 m freestyle

Mary Alice Bradburne (née Wayte; March 25, 1965) is an American former competition swimmer, two-time Olympic gold medalist, and television sports commentator. During her international swimming career, Wayte won ten medals in major international championships, including four golds.

== Early years ==
Wayte was born and raised on Mercer Island, Washington, where she swam for the Chinook Aquatic Club under Hall of Fame Coach Jack Ridley. As a 16-year-old high school sophomore, Wayte won three gold medals in the 200-meter freestyle, the 200-meter backstroke and the 800-meter freestyle relay at the National Sport Festival. She won eight Washington state high school swimming titles in five different events while attending Mercer Island High School.

== College swimming career ==
Wayte accepted an athletic scholarship to attend the University of Florida in Gainesville, Florida, where she swam for coach Randy Reese's Florida Gators swimming and diving team in National Collegiate Athletic Association (NCAA) competition from 1983 to 1987. As a Gator swimmer, she won two individual NCAA national titles in the 100-yard freestyle and the 400-yard individual medley in 1985. She won the High Point Award at the 1985 NCAA championships. With Gator teammates Laureeen Welting, Kathy Treible, Tracy Caulkins, Dara Torres and Paige Zemina, she was a member of the Gators' NCAA championship relay teams in the 400-yard and 800-yard freestyle relays for three consecutive years (1984, 1985, 1986), anchoring five of the six relays. In total, she won eight NCAA championships in those three years. She also won eleven individual Southeastern Conference (SEC) championships and was a member of ten SEC championship relay teams. Wayte was the SEC Swimmer of the Year in 1985, and received a total of twenty-six All-American honors in her four years as a collegiate swimmer.

== International swimming career ==
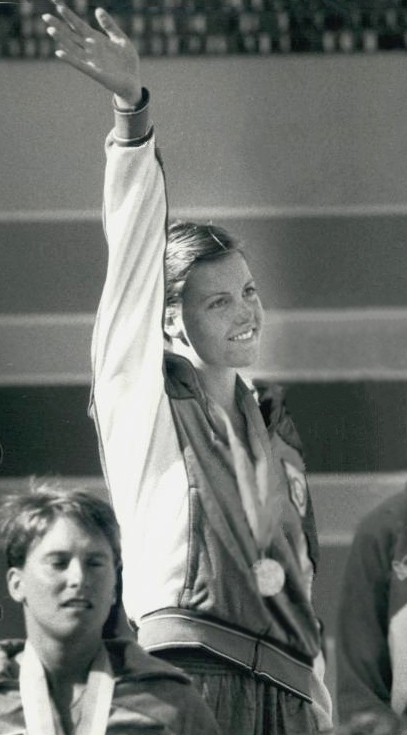
Wayte at the 1984 Olympics

From 1981 to 1988, Wayte was a member of the U.S. national swim team, competing in major international championships in Japan (1981, 1985), France (1982), the Netherlands (1982), Venezuela (1983), Monaco (1985), Spain (1986) and South Korea (1988). At the 1983 Pan American Games in Caracas, Venezuela, she won a gold medal as a member of the winning U.S. 4×100-meter freestyle relay team, and the silver medal in the 200-meter freestyle event.

At the 1984 Summer Olympics in Los Angeles, Wayte won her first Olympic gold medal in the women's 200-meter freestyle event by defeating her American rival and former world record-holder Cynthia Woodhead. Her winning 200-meter time of 1:59.23 was her career best to date, overcoming Woodhead's early lead in the final 50 meters. She earned her second Olympic gold medal by swimming in the preliminary heat for the winning U.S. women's 4×100-meter freestyle relay team.

At the 1985 Pan Pacific Swimming Championships, Wayte won an individual silver medal in the 200-meter freestyle, and a gold medal as a member of the winning U.S. 4×200-meter freestyle relay team, which set an American record of 8:06.74.

At the 1986 World Aquatics Championships, Wayte won a silver medal as the anchor of the 4×200-meter freestyle relay team with teammates Betsy Mitchell, Mary T. Meagher, and Kim Brown, which set another American record of 8:02.12. She won a second silver medal for swimming in the preliminary heat of the 4×100-meter freestyle relay, and finished fifth in the individual 200-meter freestyle.

Two years later, when Seoul, South Korea hosted the 1988 Summer Olympics, she swam the freestyle leg for the silver medal-winning U.S. team in the women's 4×100-meter medley relay with teammates Beth Barr (backstroke), Tracey McFarlane (breaststroke), and Janel Jorgensen (butterfly). The U.S. women's medley relay team was fraught with last-minute drama, as several previously selected swimmers dropped out to focus on individual events, or were replaced because they had performed below expectations, only hours before the event final. In the event final, the U.S. medley relay team included women with no history of competing together, no relay exchange practice, and no coach; the East German favorites taunted the Americans before the race. Wayte would later characterize the race as one of her proudest moments. She also captured a bronze medal with the third-place U.S. women's 4×100-meter freestyle relay team that included Mitzi Kremer, Dara Torres and Laura Walker. Individually, she finished fourth in the women's 200-meter freestyle with a time of 1:59.04, faster than her gold medal effort four years earlier in Los Angeles, and was a medal contender in the women's 200-meter individual medley, but was disqualified when the judges ruled she used an illegal butterfly kick on the breaststroke leg of the medley.

== Life after swimming ==
Wayte graduated from the University of Florida with a bachelor's degree in telecommunications in 1989. She retired from competition swimming following the 1988 Olympics, and worked as a fund-raiser for the International Swimming Hall of Fame. She became a celebrity promoter and endorsed products and services on behalf of Alamo Rent a Car, the National Spa and Pool Institute, and Speedo.

She later worked as a television broadcaster for the Sports Channel network, covering NCAA and international swimming competitions and interviewing fans at NBA games. For the 1992 Summer Olympics in Barcelona, Spain, Wayte worked as NBC's women's swimming color commentator, and later covered the NCAA women's swimming championships for ESPN. She also served on the U.S. Olympic Committee's athletes advisory council.

Wayte was inducted into the University of Florida Athletic Hall of Fame as a "Gator Great" in 1998, the International Swimming Hall of Fame in 2000, and the Pacific Northwest Swimming Hall of Fame in 2004. The community swimming pool where she formerly trained in Mercer Island, Washington was renamed "Mary Wayte Pool".

Wayte has two daughters. She currently lives in Seattle, Washington, and works in corporate communications. Wayte is Vice Chair of the USA Swimming Foundation and co-captain of Team Wayte for Swim Across America, a charitable organization that enlists former Olympic swimmers to raise funds for cancer research.

== See also ==
- List of multiple Olympic gold medalists
- List of Olympic medalists in swimming (women)
- List of United States records in swimming
- List of University of Florida alumni
- List of University of Florida Athletic Hall of Fame members
- List of University of Florida Olympians
- List of World Aquatics Championships medalists in swimming (women)
