= Cindy Õunpuu =

Canadian-Estonian swimmer

Personal information
- Born: November 11, 1966 (age 59) Toronto, Canada

Sport
- Sport: Swimming
- Strokes: Breaststroke
Medal record
Representing Canada
Commonwealth Games
Silver medal – second place	1986 Edinburgh	200m breaststroke
Pan Pacific Championships
Gold medal – first place	1985 Tokyo	100m breaststroke

Cindy Õunpuu (also Ounpuu; married name Yelle; born 11 November 1966) is a Canadian-Estonian swimmer.

She was born in Toronto, Canada. She graduated from University of Florida in Gainesville and is a 2-time NCAA Champion and record holder.

She started swimming at a very early age. In 1985 she won a gold medal at the 1985 Pan Pacific Swimming Championships in Tokyo, Japan. She is a 12-time Canadian national champion. 1983–1986 she was a member of Canadian national swimming team. She was also a swimmer for the Canadian team at the 1984 Summer Olympics in Los Angeles.

In 1985 she was named the Best Female Swimmer of Canada.
