= Swimming at the 1983 Pan American Games – Women's 4 × 100 metre freestyle relay =

Women's 4 × 100 metre freestyle relay at the 1983 Pan American Games
- Venue: -
- Dates: August 19 (preliminaries and finals)
- Competitors: from - nations

Medalists
Gold medal	Jill Sterkel, Dara Torres, Mary Wayte and Carrie Steinseifer	United States
Silver medal	Pamela Rai, Jane Kerr, -, -	Canada
Bronze medal	-,-,-,-	Mexico

The women's 4 × 100 metre freestyle relay competition of the swimming events at the 1983 Pan American Games took place on 19 August. The last Pan American Games champion was the United States.

This race consisted of eight lengths of the pool. Each of the four swimmers completed two lengths of the pool. The first swimmer had to touch the wall before the second could leave the starting block.

== Results ==
All times are in minutes and seconds.

KEY:	q	Fastest non-qualifiers	Q	Qualified	GR	Games record	NR	National record	PB	Personal best	SB	Seasonal best

=== Final ===
The final was held on August 19.

Rank	Name	Nationality	Time	Notes
1st place, gold medalist(s)	Jill Sterkel; Dara Torres; Mary Wayte; Carrie Steinseifer	United States	3:46.46	
2nd place, silver medalist(s)	Pamela Rai; Jane Kerr - -	Canada	3:49.49	
3rd place, bronze medalist(s)	- - - -	Mexico	4:00.43	NR
4	Patrícia Amorim; Cristiane Pereira; Adriana Pereira; Priscila Grocoske	Brazil	4:04.49	NR
5	- - - -	Argentina	4:05.69	
6	- - - -	Venezuela	4:07.42	NR
7	- - - -	Puerto Rico	4:08.11	
8	- - - -	Cuba	4:21.22	
