= Christophe Deneuville =

French swimmer

Personal information
- Nationality: French
- Born: 26 May 1967 (age 59)

Sport
- Sport: Swimming

Christophe Deneuville (born 26 May 1967) is a French swimmer. He competed in the men's 200 metre breaststroke at the 1984 Summer Olympics.
