= Vlastimil Černý =

Canadian swimmer (born 1963)

Personal information
- Full name: Vlastimil Černý
- National team: Canada
- Born: April 7, 1963 (age 63) Vyškov, Czechoslovakia
- Height: 1.83 m (6 ft 0 in)
- Weight: 90 kg (200 lb)

Sport
- Sport: Swimming
- Strokes: Butterfly, freestyle
Medal record
Men's swimming
Representing Canada
Pan Pacific Championships
| Silver medal – second place | 1985 Tokyo | 200m butterfly |

Vlastimil Černý (born April 7, 1963) is a former butterfly and freestyle swimmer, who competed for Canada at the 1988 Summer Olympics in Seoul, South Korea. There he finished in 12th position in the 100-metre butterfly, and in ninth place with the men's 4x100-metre freestyle relay team.

In 1982, he, along with Miloslav Rolko, Tereza Vrtiskova and Josef Kuf (all swimmers), defected from Czechoslovakia following a meet in Sindelfingen, West Germany.

Černý has been the coach of the University of Manitoba Bisons Swim team since 1993. In 2020, he was awarded the U SPORTS Fox 40 women's swimming Coach of the Year.

== See also ==
- List of Commonwealth Games medallists in swimming (men)
