= Brett Stocks =

Australian swimmer

Personal information
- Born: 14 March 1963 (age 63)

Sport
- Sport: Swimming
Medal record
Men's swimming
Representing Australia
Commonwealth Games
Bronze medal – third place	1986 Edinburgh	100 m breaststroke
Bronze medal – third place	1986 Edinburgh	4×100 m medley

Brett Peter Stocks (born 14 March 1963) is an Australian swimmer. He competed in the men's 100 metre breaststroke at the 1984 Summer Olympics.
