= Mitzi Kremer =

American swimmer (born 1968)

Personal information
- Full name: Mitzi Patricia Kremer
- National team: United States
- Born: March 18, 1968 (age 58)
- Height: 5 ft 10 in (1.78 m)
- Weight: 150 lb (68 kg)
- Spouse: Mark Tighe
- Children: 2

Sport
- Sport: Swimming
- Strokes: Freestyle
- Club: Concordia-Pleasant Hill
- College team: Clemson University
Medal record
Women's swimming
Representing the United States
Olympic Games
| Bronze medal – third place | 1988 Seoul | 4x100 m freestyle |
Pan Pacific Championships
| Gold medal – first place | 1987 Brisbane | 200 m freestyle |
| Gold medal – first place | 1987 Brisbane | 4x200 m freestyle |
| Gold medal – first place | 1989 Tokyo | 4x200 m freestyle |
| Silver medal – second place | 1989 Tokyo | 200 m freestyle |
Summer Universiade
| Gold medal – first place | 1987 Zagreb | 100 m freestyle |
| Gold medal – first place | 1987 Zagreb | 4x200 m freestyle |
| Silver medal – second place | 1987 Zagreb | 200 m freestyle |
| Silver medal – second place | 1987 Zagreb | 400 m freestyle |

Mitzi Patricia Kremer (born March 18, 1968), later known by her married name Mitzi Tighe, is an American former competition swimmer for Clemson University who represented the United States at the 1988 Summer Olympics in Seoul, South Korea where she won a bronze medal in the 4x100 meter freestyle relay. Since 1994, she has worked as a swim coach and Aquatics director in Florida. She coached at her alma mater Titusville High School, where she led the boys team to a conference title in 1994 and founded the Titusville Swim Club in 1995. From 1996-2010, she served as Coach for the Tampa Palms Country Club and later Coach and Aquatics Director for the New Tampa YMCA where she met her husband Mark Tighe, another Team New Tampa swim coach.

== Early life and swimming ==
Born on March 18, 1968 to Peter and Ann Kremer, Mitzi Kremer grew up in Titusville, Florida where she swam for Titusville High School, graduating in 1986. While at Titusville, she was trained and managed by the girls' team Coach Dennis Filler. On November 12, 1983, she helped Titusville win the Class 3A District 3 Championship when her 400-yard freestyle relay team placed first with a 3:42.69, breaking the former school record in the event. In December 1983, due to her command of distance freestyle events she was voted Florida Today's Today Swimmer of the Year.

At 16, Kremer was an all-Cape Coast Conference swimmer and qualified for the 1984 Olympic trials to be held in Indianapolis with a time of 2:04.49 in the 200-meter freestyle, though it was only the 8th fastest qualifying time and she would not compete with the team at the Olympics that year. On June 23, 1985, demonstrating her command of freestyle events while representing the Cape Coast Swim Club at the Area 6 Long Course Championships at Brevard Community College, Kremer won the 200 freestyle in 2:10.12, the 50 freestyle in 28.7, the 800 freestyle in 9:13.64, the 400 freestyle in 4:30.13, and the 100 freestyle in 1:03.24.

As a senior at Titusville High in the fall of 1985, Kremer captured the Class 3A 200-yard freestyle title clocking a time of 1:50.43, and became a Florida state championship title holder.

== Clemson University ==
She attended Clemson University from 1986-1989, where she swam for the Clemson Tigers swimming and diving team in National Collegiate Athletic Association (NCAA) and Atlantic Coast Conference (ACC) competition. She obtained a degree from Clemson in Biological Science. She temporarily left Clemson in her Junior year to begin training for the 1992 Olympics, but returned. While at Clemson, Kremer held Atlantic Coast Conference records in the 1000, 400, 200, and 100 freestyle events and held Clemson records in the 1000, 400, 200, 100, and 50 events.

Kremer is recognized as Clemson's most decorated swimmer, having won two NCAA championships, and sixteen All-American honors. She was a five time ACC champion from 1987-1989. Her 1987 NCAA titles for Clemson were in the 200-yard freestyle, a signature event, and in the 500 freestyle. After the Olympics, Kremer again won NCAA titles in the 200, and 500 freestyle.

== International competition ==
Her most outstanding performance at an international meet was likely at the 1987 Pan Pacific Games in Brisbane, Australia where she captured gold in the 200 freestyle and the 4x200 freestyle relay. At the 1989 Pan Pacifics in Tokyo, she took the gold medal again in the 4x200 relay, and took a gold medal in the 200 freestyle as well. At the 1987 Universiade in Zagreb, she won golds in the 100-meter freestyle and the 4×200-meter freestyle relay, and silver medals in the 200-meter freestyle, the 400-meter freestyle, and the 4×100 meter freestyle relay.

== 1988 Olympic bronze medal ==
For the 1988 Olympic trials in Austin, Texas in August, 1998, Kremer represented the Pleasant Hill Swim Club, where she swam a 55.40 placing second in the finals of the 100-meter freestyle, with the former American record being 55.15. Her time qualified her for the Women's 4x100 freestyle relay team. On August 9, 1988, she won the Olympic Trial finals of the 200-meter freestyle in 1:58.97.

Kremer received a bronze medal as a member of the third-place U.S. team, swimming the second leg in the women's 4×100-meter freestyle relay, together with teammates Mary Wayte, Dara Torres and Laura Walker. The American team swam a 3:44.25 in the 4x100 relay, less than a second behind the second place team from the Netherlands, but over three seconds behind the first place East German women's team who took the gold.

At the 1988 Olympics, she also placed 12th in the 100-meter freestyle, and 6th in the 200-meter freestyle.

=== Honors ===
Kremer was voted the Atlantic Coast Conference Championship Most Valuable Player in 1987 and 1989, and was an inductee of the Clemson Hall of Fame in 1994. She was later a 2012 Inductee into the Space Coast Sports Hall of Fame.

In January 2003, for the golden anniversary of the ACC, she was announced as one of the Atlantic Coast Conference top fifty female athletes for her accomplishments at Clemson from 1987-1989.

From 1988-92 during her training, Kremer worked occasionally as a volunteer coaching age group swimmers, which led her to consider coaching as a future career. In September, 1990, Kremer underwent surgery on her left shoulder influenced her timing for retiring from elite competition or training for the 1992 Olympics.

== Coaching and later life ==
In 1994, in one of her earliest coaching assignments, she led Titusville High School Boys' team to their first conference title since 1991. In Titusville, Kremer would later start the Titusville Swim Team Orcas in 1995 and serve as aquatics director of the Titusville YMCA. The Titusville Swim Team Orcas was taken over by Mitzi's sister Natasha, who also swam for Clemson.

Kremer started coaching at the Tampa Palms Country Club beginning around March 1996, where she coached Team New Tampa. In 2001, she moved Team New Tampa to the New Tampa YMCA and served as the new Head Coach for their 50-meter pool facility. In 1998, Team New Tampa hired Mark Tighe as an Assistant Coach, and Kremer would marry Tighe during her time coaching at the club. At Team New Tampa, Kremer coached a range of students, from beginning swimmers to state all-stars, Junior Olympians, and Olympic trial candidates. She remained the head coach of Team New Tampa YMCA club swim team, in Tampa, Florida, until 2010. She more recently lives in Titusville, Florida, where she grew up, and has been in charge of the Space Coast Aquatic Club and ROCOA of Brevard in Brevard County, Florida.

She was in charge of the Aquatics program at the YMCA Aquatic and Family Center in Orlando beginning around 2012, when in 2015 she accepted a position to return to her native Brevard County and become Head swim Coach at Cocoa High School with Co-coach Chris Beadle. While coaching Cocoa High, she coached ROCOA Swim Club in Brevard County and taught for a period at Apollo Elementary School.

== See also ==
- List of Clemson University Olympians
- List of Olympic medalists in swimming (women)
