= Ralf Diegel =

German swimmer

Personal information
- Nationality: German
- Born: 1 December 1963 (age 62) Frechen, West Germany

Sport
- Sport: Swimming
- Club: FSV - Frechener Schwimm Verein

Ralf Diegel (born 1 December 1963) is a German swimmer. He competed in two events at the 1984 Summer Olympics for West Germany.
