= Étienne Dagon =

Swiss swimmer (born 1960)

Medal record

Men's swimming

Representing Switzerland

Olympic Games
Bronze medal – third place	1984 Los Angeles	200 m breaststroke

European Championships (LC)
Bronze medal – third place	1985 Sofia	200 m breaststroke

Étienne Dagon (born 13 September 1960 in Biel/Bienne) is a former breaststroke swimmer from Switzerland who won the bronze medal in the men's 200 m breaststroke at the 1984 Summer Olympics in Los Angeles, California. For that performance he was named Swiss Sportsman of the Year.

Awards
Preceded by (Switzerland) Urs Freuler	Swiss Sportsman of the Year; 1984	Succeeded by (Switzerland) Pirmin Zurbriggen
