= Erik Rosskopf =

U.S. Virgin Islands swimmer (born 1965)

Personal information
- Born: May 25, 1965 (age 61) Los Angeles, California, United States

Sport
- Sport: Swimming

Erik Rosskopf (born May 25, 1965) is a swimmer who represented the United States Virgin Islands. He competed in four events at the 1984 Summer Olympics.
