= Peru at the 1984 Summer Olympics =

- IOC code: PER
- NOC: Peruvian Olympic Committee

in Los Angeles
- Competitors: 35 (19 men and 16 women) in 10 sports
- Flag bearer: Edwin Vásquez
- Medals Ranked 33rd: Gold 0 Silver 1 Bronze 0 Total 1

Summer Olympics appearances (overview)
- 1900; 1904–1932; 1936; 1948; 1952; 1956; 1960; 1964; 1968; 1972; 1976; 1980; 1984; 1988; 1992; 1996; 2000; 2004; 2008; 2012; 2016; 2020; 2024

Peru competed at the 1984 Summer Olympics in Los Angeles, United States. 35 competitors, 19 men and 16 women, took part in 29 events in 10 sports.

== Medalists ==
Medal	Name	Sport	Event	Date
Silver	Francisco Boza	Shooting	Mixed trap	July 31

Medals by sport
Sport	1st place, gold medalist(s)	2nd place, silver medalist(s)	3rd place, bronze medalist(s)	Total
Shooting	0	1	0	1
Total	0	1	0	1

== Athletics ==
Men's 5,000 metres

- Roger Soler

- Heat — 14:28.26 (→ did not advance)

Women's Marathon

- Ena Guevara

- Final — 2:46:50 (→ 35th place)

== Cycling ==
One cyclist represented Peru in 1984.

Individual road race

- Ramón Zavaleta — did not finish (→ no ranking)

== Shooting ==
Mixed

A three-way tie for the medals was broken with a 25-target shoot-off. Luciano Giovannetti, the defending champion, won with a score of 24. Francisco Boza hit 23, while Daniel Carlisle hit 22.

Athlete	Event	Score	Rank
Francisco Boza	mixed trap	192	2nd place, silver medalist(s)

== Swimming ==
Men's 100m Freestyle

- Fernando Rodríguez

- Heat — 54.61 (→ did not advance, 44th place)

Men's 100m Backstroke

- Fernando Rodríguez

- Heat — 1:02.27 (→ did not advance, 34th place)

- Alejandro Alvizuri

- Heat — 1:02.63 (→ did not advance, 35th place)

Men's 200m Backstroke

- Alejandro Alvizuri

- Heat — 2:13.30 (→ did not advance, 30th place)

Men's 100m Breaststroke

- Oscar Ortigosa

- Heat — 1:09.07 (→ did not advance, 41st place)

Men's 200m Breaststroke

- Oscar Ortigosa

- Heat — 2:29.73 (→ did not advance, 33rd place)

Men's 200m Individual Medley

- Fernando Rodríguez

- Heat — DSQ (→ did not advance, no ranking)

Women's 100m Freestyle

- Sandra Crousse

- Heat — 1:01.02 (→ did not advance, 31st place)

Women's 200m Freestyle

- Sandra Crousse

- Heat — 2:08.15 (→ did not advance, 22nd place)

Women's 200m Butterfly

- Karin Brandes

- Heat — DNS (→ did not advance, no ranking)

Women's 200m Individual Medley

- Karin Brandes

- Heat — 2:29.87 (→ did not advance, 24th place)

Women's 400m Individual Medley

- Karin Brandes

- Heat — 5:11.92 (→ did not advance, 18th place)

== Volleyball ==
=== Women's team competition ===
Peru women's volleyball team qualified for the Olympics by winning the 1983 Women's South American Volleyball Championship.

Team roster

Head coach: Park Man-Bok

No.	Name	Date of birth	Height	Weight
1	Carmen Pimentel	2 August 1961	1.71 m (5 ft 7 in)	59 kg (130 lb)
2	Ana Chaparro	28 January 1968	1.68 m (5 ft 6 in)	56 kg (123 lb)
3	Rosa Garcia	21 May 1964	1.73 m (5 ft 8 in)	65 kg (143 lb)
4	Isabel Heredia	23 November 1963	1.75 m (5 ft 9 in)	69 kg (152 lb)
5	Gabriela Perez del Solar	10 July 1968	1.94 m (6 ft 4 in)	72 kg (159 lb)
6	Cecilia del Risco	23 August 1960	1.74 m (5 ft 9 in)	60 kg (130 lb)
7	Cecilia Tait	2 May 1962	1.82 m (6 ft 0 in)	70 kg (150 lb)
8	Luisa Cervera	4 June 1964	1.73 m (5 ft 8 in)	70 kg (150 lb)
9	Denisse Fajardo	1 July 1964	1.70 m (5 ft 7 in)	59 kg (130 lb)
10	Miriam Gallardo	2 May 1968	1.68 m (5 ft 6 in)	57 kg (126 lb)
11	Gina Torrealva	16 November 1961	1.75 m (5 ft 9 in)	59 kg (130 lb)
12	Natalia Malaga	26 January 1964	1.70 m (5 ft 7 in)	59 kg (130 lb)

Group Play

Pos	Team	Pld	W	L	Pts	SW	SL	SR	SPW	SPL	SPR	Qualification
1	Japan	3	3	0	6	9	1	9.000	143	123	1.163	Semi-finals
2	Peru	3	2	1	5	6	5	1.200	123	125	0.984	Semi-finals
3	South Korea	3	1	2	4	6	6	1.000	137	125	1.096	
4	Canada	3	0	3	3	0	9	0.000	55	135	0.407	

Source: Official Report of the Games of the XXIIIrd Olympiad, Los Angeles, 1984, v. 2

30 July 1984	Peru	3–0	Canada	Long Beach Arena, Long Beach; Attendance: 8,588
30 July 1984	(15–9, 15–10, 15–4); Result			Long Beach Arena, Long Beach; Attendance: 8,588

1 August 1984	Japan	3–0	Peru	Long Beach Arena, Long Beach; Attendance: 12,003
1 August 1984	(15–8, 15–7, 15–5); Result			Long Beach Arena, Long Beach; Attendance: 12,003

3 August 1984	Peru	3–2	South Korea	Long Beach Arena, Long Beach; Attendance: 12,003
3 August 1984	(15–8, 15–6, 7–15, 6–15,15–13); Result			Long Beach Arena, Long Beach; Attendance: 12,003

Semifinal

5 August 1984	Peru	0–3	United States	Long Beach Arena, Long Beach; Attendance: 12,003
5 August 1984	(14–16, 9–15, 10–15); Result			Long Beach Arena, Long Beach; Attendance: 12,003

Bronze medal match

7 August 1984	Japan	3–1	Peru	Long Beach Arena, Long Beach; Attendance: 12,003
7 August 1984	(13–15, 15–4, 15–7,15–10); Result			Long Beach Arena, Long Beach; Attendance: 12,003
