= Laura Walker (swimmer) =

American swimmer (born 1970)

Personal information
- Full name: Laura Anne Walker
- National team: United States
- Born: July 1, 1970 (age 56)
- Height: 5 ft 6 in (1.68 m)
- Weight: 128 lb (58 kg)

Sport
- Sport: Swimming
- Strokes: Freestyle
- Club: Concordia-Pleasant Hill
- College team: University of Florida
Medal record
Women's swimming
Representing the United States
Olympic Games
Bronze medal – third place	1988 Seoul	4x100 m freestyle
World Championships (LC)
Silver medal – second place	1986 Madrid	4×100 m freestyle
Pan Pacific Championships
Gold medal – first place	1985 Tokyo	4x200 m freestyle
Gold medal – first place	1987 Brisbane	4x100 m freestyle

Laura Anne Walker (born July 1, 1970) is an American former competition swimmer and Olympic medalist.

Walker was a member of the third-place United States women's relay team that won the bronze medal in the women's 4×100-meter freestyle relay at the 1988 Summer Olympics in Seoul, South Korea. Her winning teammates included Mary Wayte, Dara Torres and Mitzi Kremer.

Walker accepted an athletic scholarship to attend the University of Florida in Gainesville, Florida, where she swam for the Florida Gators swimming and diving team in National Collegiate Athletic Association (NCAA) competition under coach Randy Reese and coach Skip Foster from 1988 to 1992. Walker was a member of the Gators' 1989 NCAA championship 4x200-yard freestyle relay team, and four Southeastern Conference (SEC) championship relay teams in 1989 and 1992. In four years as a Gator swimmer, she received seven All-American honors.

Walker graduated from the University of Florida with a bachelor's degree in health science education in 1994.

== See also ==
- List of Olympic medalists in swimming (women)
- List of University of Florida alumni
- List of University of Florida Olympians
