= Victor Davis =

Canadian swimmer (1964–1989)

Victor Davis CM
Personal information
- Full name: Victor Davis
- National team: Canada
- Born: February 10, 1964 Guelph, Ontario, Canada
- Died: November 13, 1989 (aged 25) Sainte-Anne-de-Bellevue, Quebec, Canada
- Height: 1.88 m (6 ft 2 in)
- Weight: 87 kg (192 lb)

Sport
- Sport: Swimming
- Strokes: Breaststroke, butterfly, individual medley
- Club: Region of Waterloo Swim Club, Pointe-Claire Swim Club
Medal record
Men's swimming
Representing Canada
Olympic Games
Gold medal – first place	1984 Los Angeles	200 m breaststroke
Silver medal – second place	1984 Los Angeles	100 m breaststroke
Silver medal – second place	1984 Los Angeles	4×100 m medley
Silver medal – second place	1988 Seoul	4×100 m medley
World Championships (LC)
Gold medal – first place	1982 Guayaquil	200 m breaststroke
Gold medal – first place	1986 Madrid	100 m breaststroke
Silver medal – second place	1982 Guayaquil	100 m breaststroke
Silver medal – second place	1986 Madrid	200 m breaststroke
Pan Pacific Championships
Gold medal – first place	1987 Brisbane	100 m breaststroke
Bronze medal – third place	1987 Brisbane	200 m breaststroke
Commonwealth Games
Gold medal – first place	1982 Brisbane	200 m breaststroke
Gold medal – first place	1986 Edinburgh	100 m breaststroke
Gold medal – first place	1986 Edinburgh	4×100 m medley
Silver medal – second place	1982 Brisbane	100 m breaststroke
Silver medal – second place	1986 Edinburgh	200 m breaststroke

Victor Davis, CM (February 10, 1964 – November 13, 1989) was a Canadian Olympic and world champion swimmer who specialized in the breaststroke. He also enjoyed success in the individual medley and the butterfly.

== Biography ==
Victor Davis was born in Guelph, Ontario. As a boy, Davis learned how to swim in the lakes around his home. He then joined the Guelph Marlin Aquatic Club at the age of 12.

During his career, Davis held several world records as the winner of 31 national titles and 16 medals in international competition. At the 1982 world championships in Guayaquil, Ecuador, he set his first world record while winning the gold medal in the 200-metre breaststroke.

At the 1984 Summer Olympics in Los Angeles, California, he won a silver medal in the 100-meter breaststroke event, then captured the gold medal in the 200-metre breaststroke, in the process establishing another world record. In recognition of his accomplishments, Davis was named Swimming Canada's Athlete of the Year three times and the Canadian government made him a Member of the Order of Canada.

A star of Canada's national swim team for nine years, he retired from competitive swimming in July 1989. He was voted into the Canadian Olympic Hall of Fame in 1985, and posthumously into Canada's Sports Hall of Fame in 1990, and the International Swimming Hall of Fame in 1994.

== Death ==
A few months after his retirement, on November 11, 1989, while outside a nightclub in the Montreal suburb of Sainte-Anne-de-Bellevue, Davis was struck by a car driven by Glen Crossley, who fled the scene. Crossley told police he hit Davis while trying to avoid a juice bottle Davis threatened to throw at the vehicle and didn't realize he made contact with the swimmer. However, other testimony showed that Davis was actually hit from behind and thrown 14 m (46 ft) in the air before hitting his head on a parked car and a street curb. Two days later, the 25-year-old swimmer died of a severe skull fracture as well as brain hemorrhage and spinal hemorrhage in hospital. In February 1992, Crossley was found guilty of leaving the scene of an accident and sentenced to ten months in prison, ultimately serving four months. Three decades later Crossley would again be guilty of manslaughter, when he accidentally killed a 70 year old drunken man in a bar fight.

== Legacy ==
Davis's parents fulfilled his express wish that his organs be donated to help save the lives of others. The swimmer's heart, liver, kidneys and corneas were transplanted.

Each year since his death, awards are made by the Victor Davis Memorial Fund to help young Canadian swimmers continue their education while training. Thirteen recipients of this award participated in the 2008 Summer Olympics. In 2002, Victor Davis was inducted into the Ontario Sports Hall of Fame.

In Guelph, the city named the 50m swimming pool in honour of Victor Davis.

== Film ==
Davis's life, death and legacy were remembered in Victor, a two-hour biographical drama film that was written by the Canadian former swimmer Mark Lutz, who also appeared in the title role.

== Career highlights ==
1982 World Aquatics Championships – Guayaquil, Ecuador

- Gold medal – 200 m breaststroke (world record 2:14.77, breaking the old record of 2:15.11 set by David Wilkie in 1976)
- Silver medal – 100 m breaststroke

1982 Commonwealth Games – Brisbane, Australia

- Gold medal – 200 m Breaststroke
- Silver medal – 100 m Breaststroke

1984 Canadian Olympic Trials – Etobicoke, Ontario, Canada

- Won the 200 m breaststroke (broke his own world record with a time of 2:14.58, bettering his 1982 time)

1984 Summer Olympics – Los Angeles, United States

- Gold medal – 200 m breaststroke (established world record at 2:13.34, lowering his own 1984 record time)
- Silver medal – 100 m breaststroke
- Silver medal – 4 × 100 m medley relay

1986 Commonwealth Games – Edinburgh, Scotland

- Gold medal – 4 × 100 m medley relay
- Gold medal – 100 m breaststroke
- Silver medal – 200 m breaststroke

1986 World Aquatics Championships – Madrid, Spain

- Gold medal – 100 m breaststroke
- Silver medal – 200 m breaststroke

1988 Summer Olympics – Seoul, South Korea

- Silver medal – 4 × 100 m medley relay (1.00.90 split)
- Fourth place – 100 m breaststroke (1.02.38)

Canadian National Championships (including separate trials meets)

- 17-time national champion, 100 m breaststroke
- 14-time national champion, 200 m breaststroke
- 2-time national champion, 200 m butterfly
- 2-time national champion, 200 m individual medley
- 1 national championship, 400 m individual medley

== See also ==
- List of members of the International Swimming Hall of Fame
- List of Commonwealth Games medallists in swimming (men)
- List of Olympic medalists in swimming (men)
- World record progression 200 metres breaststroke

Records
Preceded by David Wilkie	Men's 200-metre breaststroke world record-holder (long course); August 5, 1982 – August 4, 1989	Succeeded by Mike Barrowman
