= Rick Carey =

American swimmer (born 1963)

Personal information
- Full name: Richard John Carey
- Nickname: "Rick"
- National team: United States
- Born: March 13, 1963 (age 63) Mount Kisco, New York, U.S.
- Height: 6 ft 0 in (1.83 m)
- Weight: 180 lb (82 kg)

Sport
- Sport: Swimming
- Strokes: Backstroke
- Club: Badger Swim Club
- College team: University of Texas
- Coach: Eddie Reese
Medal record
Men's swimming
Representing the United States
Olympic Games
Gold medal – first place	1984 Los Angeles	100 m backstroke
Gold medal – first place	1984 Los Angeles	200 m backstroke
Gold medal – first place	1984 Los Angeles	4x100 m medley
World Championships (LC)
Gold medal – first place	1982 Guayaquil	200 m backstroke
Gold medal – first place	1982 Guayaquil	4x100 m medley
Silver medal – second place	1982 Guayaquil	100 m backstroke
Pan Pacific Games
Gold medal – first place	1985 Tokyo	100 m backstroke
Gold medal – first place	1985 Tokyo	200 m backstroke
Gold medal – first place	1985 Tokyo	4x100 m medley
Pan American Games
Gold medal – first place	1983 Caracas	100 m backstroke
Gold medal – first place	1983 Caracas	200 m backstroke
Gold medal – first place	1983 Caracas	4x100 m medley

Richard John Carey (born March 13, 1963) is an American former competition swimmer, three-time Olympic champion, and former world record-holder in three events. Carey specialized in the backstroke. At the 1984 Summer Olympics in Los Angeles, he won three gold medals. He broke nine world records, five individually, and also was a double world champion. He was named as the Swimmer of the Year in 1983 by Swimming World magazine.

== Career ==
Carey was selected to make his international debut at the 1980 Summer Olympics in Moscow, but had to withdraw when the United States boycotted the Olympics at Jimmy Carter's insistence due to the Soviet Union's invasion of Afghanistan. In 1981 Carey was the American champion in both the 100-meter and 200-meter backstroke, setting a national record in the latter, after moving to the University of Texas at Austin to train under coach Eddie Reese. In 1982 he collected gold in the 200-meter backstroke and 4×100-meter medley relay, and silver in the 100-meter backstroke at the World Championships in Guayaguil, Ecuador.

In 1983, Carey set world records of 55.38 seconds in the 100-meter and 1:58.93 in the 200-meter backstroke, breaking marks set in 1976 by John Naber. At the 1983 Pan American Games that year in Caracas, Venezuela, he lowered the 100-meter record to 55.19 seconds and he also won the 200-meter event. He also broke the world record in the 4×100-meter medley relay, along with Steve Lundquist, Matt Gribble and Rowdy Gaines, all of whom were world record-holders in their respective strokes. This earned him the Swimmer of the Year award.

At the 1984 Summer Olympics, he won both backstroke events and again was part of the winning medley relay team. Carey created a minor controversy after his victory in the 200-meter backstroke, when despite winning Olympic gold, he appeared noticeably unhappy about having failed to break his own world record time. He later apologized and responded much more positively to his 100-meter win, despite the fact that it too fell short of his own world record. He continued to win events at a national level thereafter, retiring in 1986. He was inducted into the International Swimming Hall of Fame as an "Honor Swimmer" in 1993.

According to his Linked-In profile, Carey now works for UBS in New York City.

== See also ==
- List of multiple Olympic gold medalists
- List of Olympic medalists in swimming (men)
- List of University of Texas at Austin alumni
- List of World Aquatics Championships medalists in swimming (men)
- World record progression 100 metres backstroke
- World record progression 200 metres backstroke
- World record progression 4 × 100 metres medley relay

Records
Preceded by John Naber	Men's 100-meter backstroke world record-holder (long course); August 6, 1983 – March 15, 1988	Succeeded by Igor Polyansky
Preceded by John Naber	Men's 200-meter backstroke world record-holder (long course); August 3, 1983 – August 21, 1984	Succeeded by Sergei Zabolotnov
Awards
Preceded by Vladimir Salnikov	Swimming World; Swimmer of the Year; 1983	Succeeded by Alex Baumann
