= Collier Woolard =

American Virgin Islander swimmer

Personal information
- Full name: Collier Towning Woolard
- Born: October 30, 1968 (age 57)

Sport
- Sport: Swimming

Collier Towning Woolard (born October 30, 1968) is a swimmer who represented the United States Virgin Islands. He competed in four events at the 1984 Summer Olympics.
