= Fernando Rodríguez (swimmer) =

Peruvian swimmer (born 1963)

Personal information
- Born: 8 February 1963 (age 63)

Sport
- Sport: Swimming

Fernando Rodríguez (born 8 February 1963) is a Peruvian backstroke, freestyle and medley swimmer. He competed in three events at the 1984 Summer Olympics.
