= Marco Veilleux =

Canadian swimmer (born 1962)

Personal information
- Born: 29 October 1962 (age 63) Montreal, Quebec, Canada

Sport
- Sport: Swimming
Medal record
Representing Canada
Pan American Games
Silver medal – second place	1983 Caracas	4x100m medley relay

Marco Veilleux (born 29 October 1962) is a Canadian former swimmer. He competed in the men's 100 metre breaststroke at the 1984 Summer Olympics.
