= Oscar Ortigosa =

Peruvian swimmer

Personal information
- Born: 29 January 1966 (age 60)

Sport
- Sport: Swimming

Oscar Ortigosa (born 29 January 1966) is a Peruvian breaststroke swimmer. He competed in two events at the 1984 Summer Olympics.
