= Glen Sochasky =

Venezuelan swimmer (born 1956)

Personal information
- Full name: Glen Sochasky
- Born: November 28, 1956 (age 69) Venezuela

Sport
- Sport: Swimming
- Strokes: Breaststroke
Medal record
Men's swimming
Representing Venezuela
Pan American Games
Bronze medal – third place	1983 Caracas	4x100m medley

Glen Sochasky (born 28 November 1956) is a Venezuelan former swimmer who competed in the 1976 Summer Olympics.
