= Pablo Restrepo =

Colombian swimmer (born 1960)

Personal information
- Full name: Pablo Restrepo
- Nationality: Colombian
- Born: May 26, 1960 (age 66) Medellín, Colombia
- Height: 1.83 m (6 ft 0 in)
- Weight: 79 kg (174 lb)

Sport
- Sport: Swimming
- Strokes: Breaststroke; Medley
Medal record
Representing Colombia
Men's swimming
Pan American Games
| Silver medal – second place | 1983 Caracas | 200 m breaststroke |
| Bronze medal – third place | 1979 San Juan | 200 m breaststroke |
| Bronze medal – third place | 1983 Caracas | 100 m breaststroke |

Pablo Restrepo (born May 26, 1960 in Medellín) is a former Colombian breaststroke swimmer. He competed for his native country at three consecutive Olympics (1980–88). As of May 2009, his is the only Colombian to ever reach an Olympic Swimming Final. He attended college in the United States at Southern Illinois University.

He participated in the Central American and Caribbean Games in his native Medellin (1978), but it was his participation in the 1979 Pan American Games in San Juan, Puerto Rico that showed his capacity, where he won a bronze medal in 200-metre breaststroke.

In 1980, he swam at the Moscow Olympics, where he became the first Colombian swimmer to reach an Olympic Final: in the 100-metre final. He finished seventh in 1:05.91 in Moscow (more than two seconds behind the winner Duncan Goodhew). The hope for an Olympic medal would begin two years later at the 1982 World Championships in Guayaquil, when he placed fifth place in the 200-metre.

He followed the '82 Worlds, by finished third and second in the 100-metre and 200-metre breaststroke at the 1983 Pan American Games in Caracas, Venezuela. This, combined with the announcement of the communist countries boycotting the 1984 Summer Olympics, looked to lead to a good result in Los Angeles the following year, so after the '83 Pan Ams Restrepo went to Canada to train. Despite this, however, he failed to earn a medal at LA'84, finishing sixth place in the 200-metre. His performance (2:18.96), however, was the Colombian national record just until 2009 (the current holder is Jorge Murillo with 2:16.40).

Although he announced his retirement and came back from North America, appeared again for the 1986 Central American and Caribbean Games (St. Domingo, Dominican Rep.) with a silver medal (behind the Cuban Hernández). That result, but even more his new world championship final in Spain (in 1986 too) made him to return with the idea of the Olympic medal.

He got the gold in the 100 m in the South American Championships (over Brazil's Tortelli) in May 1988, but he failed to get his third Olympic final in Seoul that same year.

Despite the level of Colombian swimming is not from world class, even is surprising that his Colombian national records in breast were just broken in 2009 (1:03.89 against 1:03.79 in 100 m. on April and 2:18.96 against 2:16.40 in 200m, both broken by Jorge Murillo).

Today, he is dedicated to his businesses and to teaching swimming in his academy. He continues to participate in swimming competitions and, showing a great longevity, he got the silver medal in 100 m. breaststroke in the 2003 Colombia National Championships, being at least 24 years older than the winner Diego Bonilla.
