= Brian Farlow =

US Virgin Islands swimmer (born 1964)

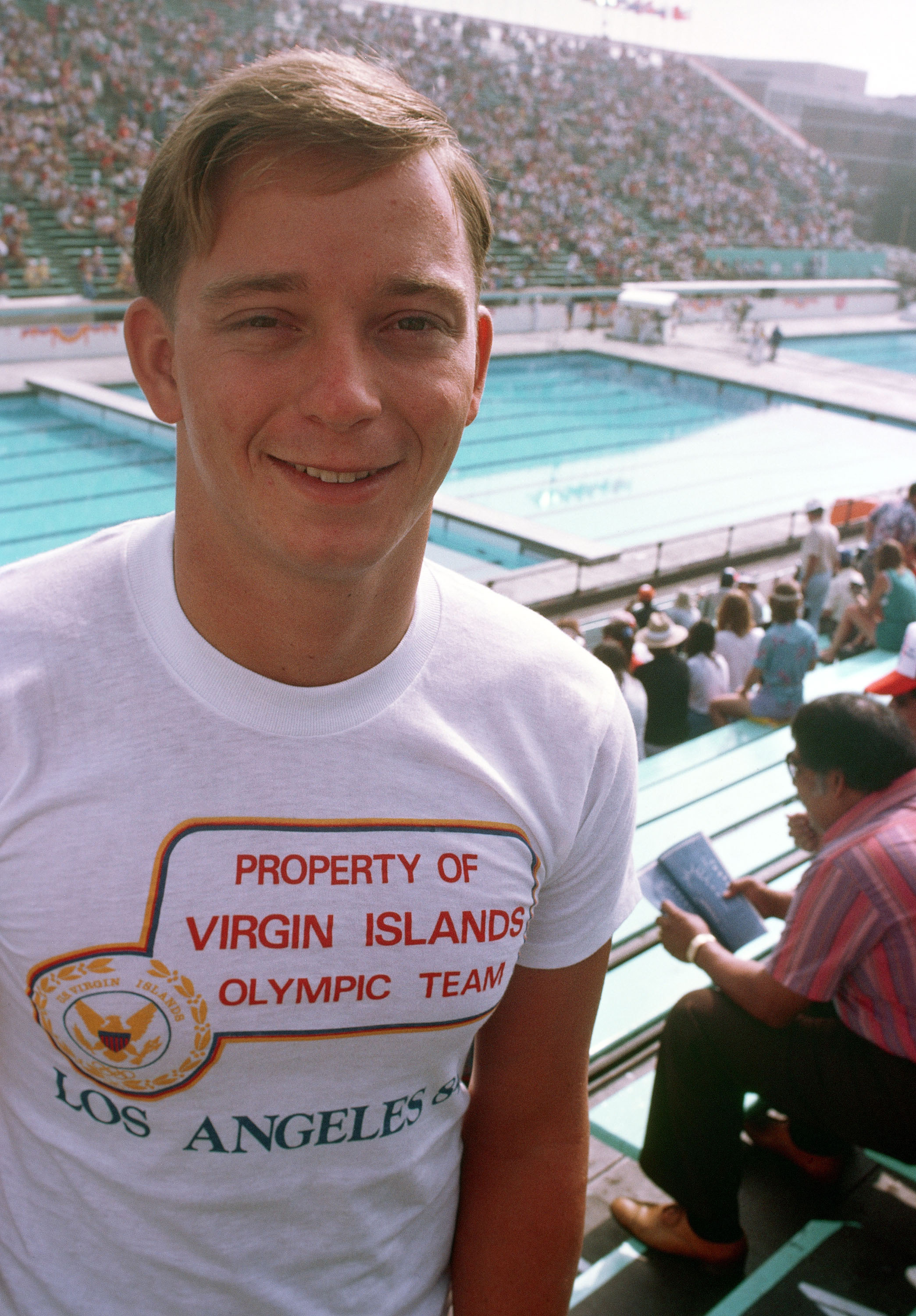
- Farlow in 1984

Personal information
- Born: November 27, 1964 (age 61) Syracuse, New York, United States

Sport
- Sport: Swimming

Brian Farlow (born November 27, 1964) is a swimmer who represented the United States Virgin Islands. He competed in four events at the 1984 Summer Olympics.
