= Harrell Woolard =

US Virgin Islands swimmer (born 1963)

Personal information
- Full name: Harrell Judson Woolard
- Born: October 6, 1963 (age 62)

Sport
- Sport: Swimming

Achievements and titles
- Olympic finals: 1984 Summer Olympics

Harrell Judson Woolard (born October 6, 1963) is a swimmer who represented the United States Virgin Islands. He competed in four events at the 1984 Summer Olympics.
