= Steve Lundquist =

American swimmer (born 1961)

Personal information
- Full name: Stephen K. Lundquist
- Nicknames: "Steve," "Lunk"
- National team: United States
- Born: February 20, 1961 (age 65) Atlanta, Georgia, U.S.
- Height: 6 ft 2 in (1.88 m)
- Weight: 183 lb (83 kg)

Sport
- Sport: Swimming
- Strokes: Breaststroke, individual medley
- College team: Southern Methodist University
Medal record
Men's swimming
Representing the United States
Olympic Games
Gold medal – first place	1984 Los Angeles	100 m breast
Gold medal – first place	1984 Los Angeles	4x100 m medley
World Championships (LC)
Gold medal – first place	1982 Guayaquil	100 m breast
Gold medal – first place	1982 Guayaquil	4×100 m medley
Pan American Games
Gold medal – first place	1979 San Juan	100 m breast
Gold medal – first place	1979 San Juan	200 m breast
Gold medal – first place	1979 San Juan	4×100 m medley
Gold medal – first place	1983 Caracas	100 m breast
Gold medal – first place	1983 Caracas	200 m breast
Gold medal – first place	1983 Caracas	4×100 m medley
Bronze medal – third place	1983 Caracas	200 m medley

Stephen K. Lundquist (born February 20, 1961) is an American former competition swimmer who is an Olympic gold medalist and former world record-holder. At the 1984 Summer Olympics in Los Angeles, he won gold medals in the 100-meter breaststroke and the 400-meter medley relay.

Lundquist was the first swimmer to break two minutes in the 200-yard breaststroke, and won every 100-yard breaststroke event he entered from 1980 to 1983. At age 17 he broke his first world record and in his career he set new world and American records on 15 occasions. He first broke the 100-meter breaststroke world record in 1982 and held it until 1989, with the exception of one month in 1984 when John Moffet broke it in June at the U.S. Olympic Trials (with Lundquist reclaiming it at the Olympic Games in July). He also held the world record in the 200-meter individual medley in 1978. He set American records in the 100-meter and 200-meter breaststroke and the 200-meter individual medley.

Coached by Arthur Winters, Lundquist switched from a butterfly swimmer when he was 12 years old to the breaststroke, which is the stroke he came to dominate. Winters was at the end of the pool when he broke his first world record at 17 years of age. At SMU, Lundquist swam for Hall of Fame Coach George McMillion.

Lundquist went on after the 1984 Olympics to spend time volunteering for charitable organizations and making appearances on television and in movies. In June 1985, People Magazine recognized him for having the Best Chest of male celebrities, which included a full-page picture of his muscular torso. In 1996 when the Olympics were hosted in Atlanta, Georgia, he was an Olympic torchbearer, the Clayton County Master of Ceremonies for the torch run, and the Olympic flagbearer at the 1996 Olympic Games.

== Achievements ==
- U.S. Honorary Olympic Team medalist, swimming, 1980
- United States Swimmer of the Year, 1982
- Olympia Award, 1983
- U.S. Olympic Team double gold medalist, swimming, 1984
- International Swimming Hall of Fame, inducted in 1990
- Georgia Sports Hall of Fame's youngest inductee, 1990
- Olympic flagbearer, torch-runner, emcee, 1996
- Voted America's Top Breast-Stroker of the Century By US Swimming
- Georgia State Games Cauldron Lighter, 1997
- 3rd place, Super Dogs Super Jocks, 1998

== Education ==
- Attended Woodward Academy, College Park, Georgia
- Graduated from Jonesboro High School, Georgia 1979
- Graduated (BBA) from Southern Methodist University (SMU) in 1984
- Graduated (MBA) from Northwestern University Kellogg Graduate School of Management (Executive Master's Program) 1994
- Graduate of Beverly Hills Playhouse School of Acting, and studied under Milton Katselas and Jeff Goldblum
- Studied voice under Ron Anderson

== Appearances on America's major national talk shows ==
- Johnny Carson
- Larry King Live
- Joan Rivers
- Good Morning America
- This Morning
- The Today Show
- CNN Sports Talk
- Radio Talk Show Host during 1996 Summer Olympics
- Commentator for the 1986 Goodwill Games in Moscow

== Acting credits ==
- Regular on Search For Tomorrow TV Soap
- The Love Boat episode "The Shipshape Cruise"
- ABC TV's Actors to Watch Talent and Development Program
- Earth Girls are Easy
- Return of the Killer Tomatoes
- Killer Tomatoes Strike Back
- Killer Tomatoes Eat France
- Beach Boys MTV video "It's Getting Late"
- Splash videos
- After School TV special nominated for an Emmy entitled "Testing Positive"
- Card Sharks (#748) January 31, 1989

== See also ==
- List of Olympic medalists in swimming (men)
- List of Southern Methodist University people
- List of World Aquatics Championships medalists in swimming (men)
- World record progression 100 metres breaststroke
- World record progression 200 metres individual medley
- World record progression 4 × 100 metres medley relay

Records
Preceded by Aleksandr Sidorenko	Men's 200-meter individual medley world record-holder (long course); August 2, 1978 – August 24, 1978	Succeeded by Graham Smith
Preceded by Gerald Mörken	Men's 100-meter breaststroke world record-holder (long course); July 19, 1982 – June 25, 1984	Succeeded by John Moffet
Preceded by John Moffet	Men's 100-meter breaststroke world record-holder (long course); July 29, 1984 – August 15, 1989	Succeeded by Adrian Moorhouse
