= Fencing at the 1984 Summer Olympics – Men's épée =

Olympic fencing event

Men's épée at the Games of the XXIII Olympiad
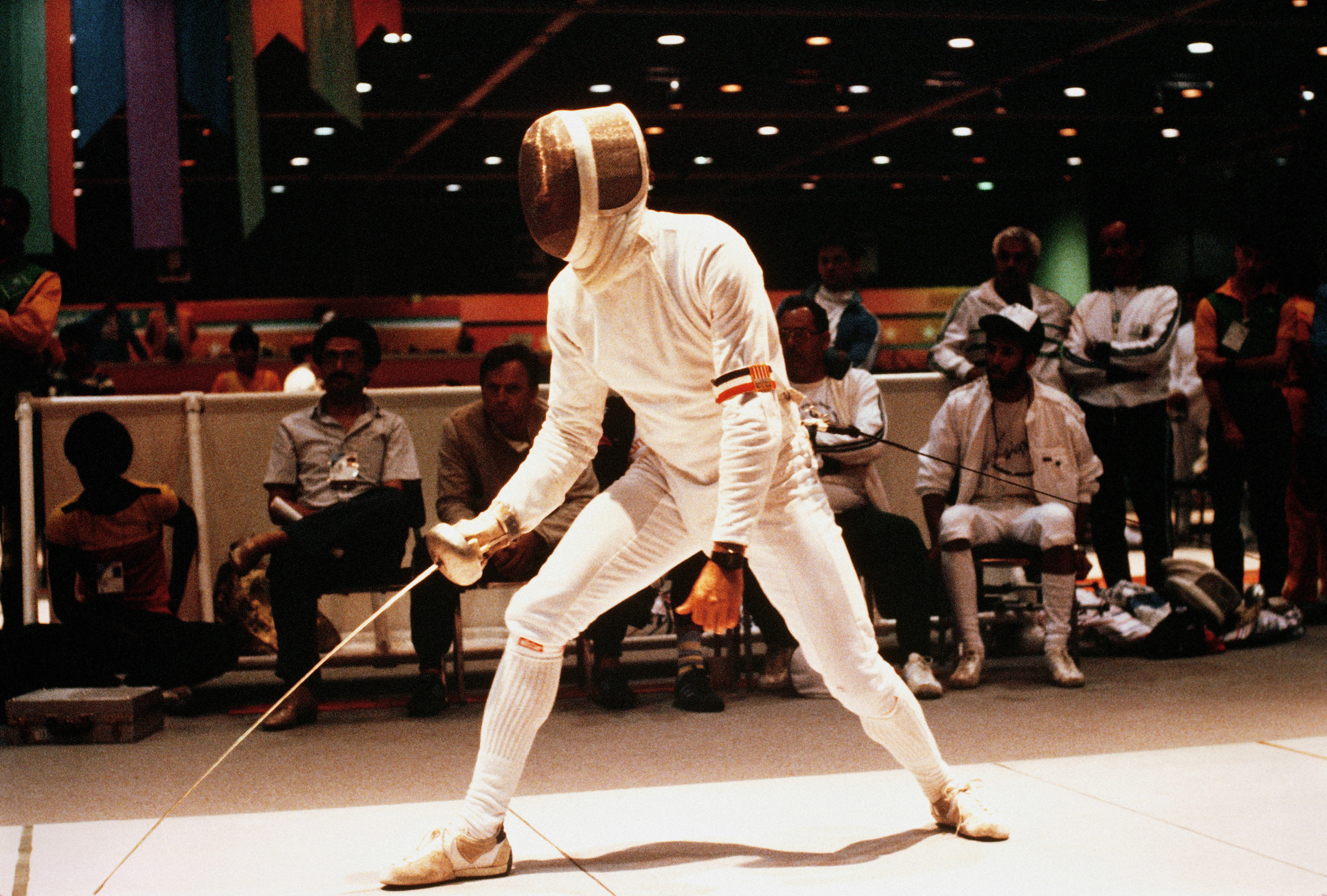
- Épée fencing at the 1984 Games (John Moreau during a team épée bout is shown)
- Venue: Long Beach Convention and Entertainment Center
- Dates: 7–8 August 1984
- Competitors: 63 from 26 nations

Medalists
| 1st place, gold medalist(s) | | Philippe Boisse; France |
| 2nd place, silver medalist(s) | | Björne Väggö; Sweden |
| 3rd place, bronze medalist(s) | | Philippe Riboud; France |

The men's épée was one of eight fencing events on the fencing at the 1984 Summer Olympics programme. It was the nineteenth appearance of the event. The competition was held from 7 to 8 August 1984. 63 fencers from 26 nations competed. Each nation was limited to 3 fencers. The event was won by Philippe Boisse of France, the nation's first victory in the men's individual épée since 1928 and fourth overall (second-most after Italy's six). France also took bronze, with Philippe Riboud winning the bronze medal match after losing to Boisse in the semifinals. It was Riboud's second consecutive bronze medal in the event, making him the 10th man to earn multiple medals in the individual épée. Silver went to Björne Väggö of Sweden. Hungary's four-Games podium streak in the event ended due to that nation joining the Soviet-led boycott.

== Background ==
This was the 19th appearance of the event, which was not held at the first Games in 1896 (with only foil and sabre events held) but has been held at every Summer Olympics since 1900.

One of the six finalists from 1980 returned: bronze medalist Philippe Riboud of France. Riboud was also the 1979 World Champion (and would win again in 1986). Two of the last three World Champions (Zoltán Székely in 1981 and Jenő Pap in 1982) were from Hungary, which boycotted the Games. The reigning World Champion, Elmar Borrmann of West Germany, competed in Los Angeles.

Bolivia, the People's Republic of China, Chinese Taipei, Saudi Arabia, and the Virgin Islands each made their debut in the event. Belgium, France, Great Britain, Sweden, and the United States each appeared for the 17th time, tied for most among nations.

== Competition format ==
The 1984 tournament used a three-phase format similar to that of 1976 and 1980, though the final phase was different.

The first phase was a multi-round round-robin pool play format; each fencer in a pool faced each other fencer in that pool once. There were three pool rounds:

- The first round had 12 pools of 5 or 6 fencers each, with the top 4 in each pool advancing.
- The second round had 8 pools of 6 fencers each, with the top 3 in each pool advancing.
- The third round had 4 pools of 6 fencers each, with the top 4 in each pool advancing.

The second phase was a truncated double-elimination tournament. Four fencers advanced to the final round through the winners brackets and four more advanced via the repechage.

The final phase was a single elimination tournament with a bronze medal match. (This was changed from a 6-man final round-robin pool in previous years.)

Bouts in the round-robin pools were to 5 touches; bouts in the double-elimination and final rounds were to 10 touches.

== Schedule ==
All times are Pacific Daylight Time (UTC-7)

| Date | Time | Round |
|---|---|---|
| Tuesday, 7 August 1984 | 9:00 | Round 1 Round 2 Round 3 |
| Wednesday, 8 August 1984 | 9:00 20:00 | Double elimination round Quarterfinals; Semifinals; Finals |

== Results ==
=== Round 1 ===
==== Round 1 Pool A ====
| Pos | Fencer | W | L | TF | TA | Notes | OL | IA | GF | AMD | JS |
|---|---|---|---|---|---|---|---|---|---|---|---|
| 1 | Olivier Lenglet (FRA) | 4 | 0 | 20 | 12 | Q | | 5–3 | 5.1–5 | 5–2 | 5–2 |
| 2 | Ihab Aly (EGY) | 2 | 2 | 15 | 11 | Q | 3–5 | | 2–5 | 5–1 | 5–0 |
| 3 | Greger Forslöw (SWE) | 2 | 2 | 17 | 14 | Q | 5–5.1 | 5–2 | | 2–5 | 5–2 |
| 4 | Ali Murat Dizioğlu (TUR) | 2 | 2 | 13 | 15 | Q | 2–5 | 1–5 | 5–2 | | 5–3 |
| 5 | Jonathan Stanbury (GBR) | 0 | 4 | 7 | 20 | | 2–5 | 0–5 | 2–5 | 3–5 | |

Source: Official Report, vol. 2, p. 401

==== Round 1 Pool B ====
| Pos | Fencer | W | L | TF | TA | Notes | ST | AM | AMS | ZZ | SM |
|---|---|---|---|---|---|---|---|---|---|---|---|
| 1 | Stephen Trevor (USA) | 3 | 1 | 18 | 13 | Q | | 5–3 | 5–3 | 3–5 | 5–2 |
| 2 | Angelo Mazzoni (ITA) | 3 | 1 | 18 | 14 | Q | 3–5 | | 5–1 | 5.1–5 | 5–3 |
| 3 | Abdel Monem Salem (EGY) | 2 | 2 | 14 | 14 | Q | 3–5 | 1–5 | | 5–4 | 5–0 |
| 4 | Zhao Zhizhong (CHN) | 1 | 3 | 19 | 18 | Q | 5–3 | 5–5.1 | 4–5 | | 5–5 |
| 5 | Saul Mendoza (BOL) | 0 | 4 | 10 | 20 | | 2–5 | 3–5 | 0–5 | 5–5 | |

Source: Official Report, vol. 2, p. 401

==== Round 1 Pool C ====
| Pos | Fencer | W | L | TF | TA | Notes | EB | JL | KS | LS | CG |
|---|---|---|---|---|---|---|---|---|---|---|---|
| 1 | Elmar Borrmann (FRG) | 3 | 1 | 19 | 13 | Q | | 4–5 | 5–2 | 5–3 | 5–3 |
| 1 | John Llewellyn (GBR) | 3 | 1 | 19 | 13 | Q | 5–4 | | 5–3 | 4–5 | 5–1 |
| 3 | Khaled Soliman (EGY) | 2 | 2 | 15 | 16 | Q | 2–5 | 3–5 | | 5–3 | 5–3 |
| 4 | Lee Shelley (USA) | 2 | 2 | 16 | 17 | Q | 3–5 | 5–4 | 3–5 | | 5–3 |
| 5 | Csaba Gaspar (ARG) | 0 | 4 | 10 | 20 | | 3–5 | 1–5 | 3–5 | 3–5 | |

Source: Official Report, vol. 2, p. 401

==== Round 1 Pool D ====
| Pos | Fencer | W | L | TF | TA | Notes | AP | BV | MD | MAT | MM |
|---|---|---|---|---|---|---|---|---|---|---|---|
| 1 | Alexander Pusch (FRG) | 3 | 1 | 18 | 11 | Q | | 5–2 | 3–5 | 5–3 | 5–1 |
| 2 | Björne Väggö (SWE) | 3 | 1 | 17 | 11 | Q | 2–5 | | 5–2 | 5–3 | 5–1 |
| 3 | Michel Dessureault (CAN) | 2 | 2 | 16 | 17 | Q | 5–3 | 2–5 | | 4–5 | 5–4 |
| 4 | Mohamed Al-Thuwani (KUW) | 1 | 3 | 14 | 19 | Q | 3–5 | 3–5 | 5–4 | | 3–5 |
| 5 | Marcelo Magnasco (ARG) | 1 | 3 | 11 | 18 | | 1–5 | 1–5 | 4–5 | 5–3 | |

Source: Official Report, vol. 2, p. 401

==== Round 1 Pool E ====
| Pos | Fencer | W | L | TF | TA | Notes | MP | LIH | PB | GP | JK |
|---|---|---|---|---|---|---|---|---|---|---|---|
| 1 | Michel Poffet (SUI) | 4 | 0 | 20 | 11 | Q | | 5–4 | 5–4 | 5–2 | 5–1 |
| 2 | Lee Il-Hui (KOR) | 3 | 1 | 19 | 11 | Q | 4–5 | | 5–1 | 5–3 | 5–2 |
| 3 | Philippe Boisse (FRA) | 2 | 2 | 15 | 11 | Q | 4–5 | 1–5 | | 5–0 | 5–1 |
| 4 | Gilberto Peña (PUR) | 1 | 3 | 10 | 18 | Q | 2–5 | 3–5 | 0–5 | | 5–3 |
| 5 | James Kerr (ISV) | 0 | 4 | 7 | 20 | | 1–5 | 2–5 | 1–5 | 3–5 | |

Source: Official Report, vol. 2, p. 401

==== Round 1 Pool F ====
| Pos | Fencer | W | L | TF | TA | Notes | JB | DG | YNJ | MB | RFAR |
|---|---|---|---|---|---|---|---|---|---|---|---|
| 1 | Jerri Bergström (SWE) | 3 | 1 | 20 | 13 | Q | | 5–2 | 5–5 | 5–3 | 5–3 |
| 2 | Daniel Giger (SUI) | 2 | 2 | 17 | 16 | Q | 2–5 | | 5–5 | 5–4 | 5–2 |
| 3 | Yun Nam-jin (KOR) | 1 | 3 | 20 | 16 | Q | 5–5 | 5–5 | | 5–5 | 5–1 |
| 4 | Martin Brill (NZL) | 1 | 3 | 17 | 19 | Q | 3–5 | 4–5 | 5–5 | | 5–4 |
| 5 | Rashid Fahd Al-Rasheed (KSA) | 0 | 4 | 10 | 20 | | 3–5 | 2–5 | 1–5 | 4–5 | |

Source: Official Report, vol. 2, p. 401

==== Round 1 Pool G ====
| Pos | Fencer | W | L | TF | TA | Notes | CY | AS | JMC | JRM | JMB |
|---|---|---|---|---|---|---|---|---|---|---|---|
| 1 | Cui Yining (CHN) | 3 | 1 | 19 | 9 | Q | | 5–2 | 5–0 | 4–5 | 5–2 |
| 2 | Arno Strohmeyer (AUT) | 2 | 2 | 16 | 15 | Q | 2–5 | | 4–5 | 5–4 | 5–1 |
| 3 | Jean-Marc Chouinard (CAN) | 2 | 2 | 14 | 16 | Q | 0–5 | 5–4 | | 5–2 | 4–5 |
| 4 | José Rafael Magallanes (VEN) | 2 | 2 | 16 | 18 | Q | 5–4 | 4–5 | 2–5 | | 5–4 |
| 5 | Jamil Mohamed Bubashit (KSA) | 1 | 3 | 12 | 19 | | 2–5 | 1–5 | 5–4 | 4–5 | |

Source: Official Report, vol. 2, p. 401

==== Round 1 Pool H ====
| Pos | Fencer | W | L | TF | TA | Notes | NK | ZX | AF | SJ | LCO |
|---|---|---|---|---|---|---|---|---|---|---|---|
| 1 | Nils Koppang (NOR) | 4 | 0 | 20 | 10 | Q | | 5–3 | 5–3 | 5–3 | 5–1 |
| 2 | Zong Xiangqing (CHN) | 2 | 2 | 17 | 14 | Q | 3–5 | | 5–3 | 5–1 | 4–5 |
| 3 | Ángel Fernández (ESP) | 2 | 2 | 16 | 14 | Q | 3–5 | 3–5 | | 5–4 | 5–0 |
| 4 | Stefan Joos (BEL) | 1 | 3 | 13 | 16 | Q | 3–5 | 1–5 | 4–5 | | 5–1 |
| 5 | Liu Chi On (HKG) | 1 | 3 | 7 | 19 | | 1–5 | 5–4 | 0–5 | 1–5 | |

Source: Official Report, vol. 2, p. 401

==== Round 1 Pool I ====
| Pos | Fencer | W | L | TF | TA | Notes | SP | DP | SG | TSH | LTC |
|---|---|---|---|---|---|---|---|---|---|---|---|
| 1 | Steven Paul (GBR) | 4 | 0 | 20 | 11 | Q | | 5–4 | 5–4 | 5–3 | 5–0 |
| 2 | Daniel Perreault (CAN) | 3 | 1 | 19 | 12 | Q | 4–5 | | 5.1–5 | 5–2 | 5–0 |
| 3 | Stéphane Ganeff (BEL) | 2 | 2 | 19 | 14 | Q | 4–5 | 5–5.1 | | 5–2 | 5–2 |
| 4 | Tsai Shing-Hsiang (TPE) | 1 | 3 | 12 | 15 | Q | 3–5 | 2–5 | 2–5 | | 5–0 |
| 5 | Lam Tak Chuen (HKG) | 0 | 4 | 2 | 20 | | 0–5 | 0–5 | 2–5 | 0–5 | |

Source: Official Report, vol. 2, p. 403

==== Round 1 Pool J ====
| Pos | Fencer | W | L | TF | TA | Notes | VF | RM | SL | TS | MAAA | LTC |
|---|---|---|---|---|---|---|---|---|---|---|---|---|
| 1 | Volker Fischer (FRG) | 5 | 0 | 25 | 9 | Q | | 5–4 | 5–1 | 5–2 | 5–1 | 5–1 |
| 2 | Robert Marx (USA) | 4 | 1 | 24 | 15 | Q | 4–5 | | 5–3 | 5–0 | 5–3 | 5–4 |
| 3 | Sergio Luchetti (ARG) | 2 | 3 | 19 | 21 | Q | 1–5 | 3–5 | | 5–5 | 5–2 | 5–4 |
| 4 | Thierry Soumagne (BEL) | 2 | 3 | 17 | 22 | Q | 2–5 | 0–5 | 5–5 | | 5–3 | 5–4 |
| 5 | Mohamed Ahmed Abu Ali (KSA) | 1 | 4 | 14 | 25 | | 1–5 | 3–5 | 2–5 | 3–5 | | 5.1–5 |
| 6 | Lee Tai-Chung (TPE) | 0 | 5 | 18 | 25 | | 1–5 | 4–5 | 4–5 | 4–5 | 5–5.1 | |

Source: Official Report, vol. 2, p. 403

==== Round 1 Pool K ====
| Pos | Fencer | W | L | TF | TA | Notes | PR | SB | HL | BV | DC | OAK |
|---|---|---|---|---|---|---|---|---|---|---|---|---|
| 1 | Philippe Riboud (FRA) | 4 | 1 | 22 | 15 | Q | | 2–5 | 5–2 | 5–4 | 5–2 | 5–2 |
| 2 | Stefano Bellone (ITA) | 3 | 2 | 23 | 17 | Q | 5–2 | | 5–5 | 5–3 | 3–5 | 5–2 |
| 3 | Hannes Lembacher (AUT) | 2 | 3 | 20 | 22 | Q | 2–5 | 5–5 | | 5–3 | 3–5 | 5–4 |
| 3 | Bård Vonen (NOR) | 2 | 3 | 20 | 22 | Q | 4–5 | 3–5 | 3–5 | | 5–3 | 5–4 |
| 5 | Denis Cunningham (HKG) | 2 | 3 | 17 | 21 | | 2–5 | 5–3 | 5–3 | 3–5 | | 2–5 |
| 6 | Osama Al-Khurafi (KUW) | 1 | 4 | 17 | 22 | | 2–5 | 2–5 | 4–5 | 4–5 | 5–2 | |

Source: Official Report, vol. 2, p. 403

==== Round 1 Pool L ====
| Pos | Fencer | W | L | TF | TA | Notes | GN | KH | KSM | SC | DC | JHP |
|---|---|---|---|---|---|---|---|---|---|---|---|---|
| 1 | Gabriel Nigon (SUI) | 5 | 0 | 25 | 12 | Q | | 5–3 | 5–4 | 5–2 | 5–2 | 5–1 |
| 2 | Kazem Hasan (KUW) | 3 | 2 | 18 | 18 | Q | 3–5 | | 0–5 | 5–4 | 5–2 | 5–2 |
| 3 | Kim Seong-Mun (KOR) | 2 | 3 | 21 | 19 | Q | 4–5 | 5–0 | | 3–5 | 5–4 | 4–5 |
| 4 | Sandro Cuomo (ITA) | 2 | 3 | 21 | 20 | Q | 2–5 | 4–5 | 5–3 | | 5–5.1 | 5–2 |
| 5 | David Cocker (NZL) | 2 | 3 | 18 | 24 | | 2–5 | 2–5 | 4–5 | 5.1–5 | | 5–4 |
| 6 | John Hugo Pedersen (NOR) | 1 | 4 | 14 | 24 | | 1–5 | 2–5 | 5–4 | 2–5 | 4–5 | |

Source: Official Report, vol. 2, p. 403

=== Round 2 ===
==== Round 2 Pool A ====
| Pos | Fencer | W | L | TF | TA | Notes | VF | ST | AM | JMC | AMD | GP |
|---|---|---|---|---|---|---|---|---|---|---|---|---|
| 1 | Volker Fischer (FRG) | 4 | 1 | 23 | 14 | Q | | 3–5 | 5–3 | 5–4 | 5–1 | 5–1 |
| 2 | Stephen Trevor (USA) | 4 | 1 | 22 | 14 | Q | 5–3 | | 5–2 | 5–2 | 2–5 | 5–2 |
| 3 | Angelo Mazzoni (ITA) | 3 | 2 | 20 | 15 | Q | 3–5 | 2–5 | | 5–3 | 5–0 | 5–2 |
| 4 | Jean-Marc Chouinard (CAN) | 2 | 3 | 19 | 21 | | 4–5 | 2–5 | 3–5 | | 5–4 | 5–2 |
| 5 | Ali Murat Dizioğlu (TUR) | 2 | 3 | 15 | 18 | | 1–5 | 5–2 | 0–5 | 4–5 | | 5–1 |
| 6 | Gilberto Peña (PUR) | 0 | 5 | 8 | 25 | | 1–5 | 2–5 | 2–5 | 2–5 | 1–5 | |

Source: Official Report, vol. 2, p. 403

==== Round 2 Pool B ====
| Pos | Fencer | W | L | TF | TA | Notes | MD | EB | JL | LE | GN | MAT |
|---|---|---|---|---|---|---|---|---|---|---|---|---|
| 1 | Michel Dessureault (CAN) | 4 | 1 | 24 | 9 | Q | | 5–2 | 4–5 | 5–2 | 5–0 | 5–0 |
| 2 | Elmar Borrmann (FRG) | 4 | 1 | 22 | 14 | Q | 2–5 | | 5–0 | 5–4 | 5–3 | 5–2 |
| 3 | John Llewellyn (GBR) | 4 | 1 | 20 | 16 | Q | 5–4 | 0–5 | | 5–2 | 5–3 | 5–2 |
| 4 | Lee Shelley (USA) | 1 | 4 | 15 | 21 | | 2–5 | 4–5 | 2–5 | | 2–5 | 5–1 |
| 5 | Gabriel Nigon (SUI) | 1 | 4 | 13 | 22 | | 0–5 | 3–5 | 3–5 | 5–2 | | 2–5 |
| 6 | Mohamed Al-Thuwani (KUW) | 1 | 4 | 10 | 22 | | 0–5 | 2–5 | 2–5 | 1–5 | 5–2 | |

Source: Official Report, vol. 2, p. 403

==== Round 2 Pool C ====
| Pos | Fencer | W | L | TF | TA | Notes | BV | SB | NK | KS | JRM | SJ |
|---|---|---|---|---|---|---|---|---|---|---|---|---|
| 1 | Björne Väggö (SWE) | 5 | 0 | 25 | 14 | Q | | 5–4 | 5–2 | 5–2 | 5–3 | 5–3 |
| 2 | Stefano Bellone (ITA) | 4 | 1 | 24 | 21 | Q | 4–5 | | 5–4 | 5.1–5 | 5.1–5 | 5–2 |
| 3 | Nils Koppang (NOR) | 3 | 2 | 21 | 14 | Q | 2–5 | 4–5 | | 5–2 | 5–2 | 5–0 |
| 4 | Khaled Soliman (EGY) | 2 | 3 | 19 | 18 | | 2–5 | 5–5.1 | 2–5 | | 5–1 | 5–2 |
| 5 | José Rafael Magallanes (VEN) | 1 | 4 | 16 | 23 | | 3–5 | 5–5.1 | 2–5 | 1–5 | | 5–3 |
| 6 | Stefan Joos (BEL) | 0 | 5 | 10 | 25 | | 3–5 | 2–5 | 0–5 | 2–5 | 3–5 | |

Source: Official Report, vol. 2, p. 403

==== Round 2 Pool D ====
| Pos | Fencer | W | L | TF | TA | Notes | DG | JB | SP | KSM | TSH | KH |
|---|---|---|---|---|---|---|---|---|---|---|---|---|
| 1 | Daniel Giger (SUI) | 4 | 1 | 25 | 16 | Q | | 5.1–5 | 5–4 | 5–5 | 5–1 | 5–1 |
| 2 | Jerri Bergström (SWE) | 3 | 2 | 25 | 19 | Q | 5–5.1 | | 5–4 | 5–5 | 5–2 | 5–3 |
| 3 | Steven Paul (GBR) | 2 | 3 | 22 | 18 | Q | 4–5 | 4–5 | | 4–5 | 5–0 | 5–3 |
| 4 | Kim Seong-Mun (KOR) | 2 | 3 | 24 | 21 | | 5–5 | 5–5 | 5–4 | | 4–5 | 5–2 |
| 5 | Tsai Shing-Hsiang (TPE) | 2 | 3 | 13 | 23 | | 1–5 | 2–5 | 0–5 | 5–4 | | 5–4 |
| 6 | Kazem Hasan (KUW) | 0 | 5 | 13 | 25 | | 1–5 | 3–5 | 3–5 | 2–5 | 4–5 | |

Source: Official Report, vol. 2, p. 403

==== Round 2 Pool E ====
| Pos | Fencer | W | L | TF | TA | Notes | MP | SC | DP | ZZ | SG | AMS |
|---|---|---|---|---|---|---|---|---|---|---|---|---|
| 1 | Michel Poffet (SUI) | 4 | 1 | 22 | 17 | Q | | 2–5 | 5–4 | 5–3 | 5–2 | 5–3 |
| 2 | Sandro Cuomo (ITA) | 3 | 2 | 21 | 15 | Q | 5–2 | | 2–5 | 5–2 | 4–5 | 5–1 |
| 3 | Daniel Perreault (CAN) | 3 | 2 | 22 | 16 | Q | 4–5 | 5–2 | | 3–5 | 5–1 | 5–3 |
| 4 | Zhao Zhizhong (CHN) | 3 | 2 | 20 | 19 | | 3–5 | 2–5 | 5–3 | | 5–4 | 5–2 |
| 5 | Stéphane Ganeff (BEL) | 2 | 3 | 17 | 22 | | 2–5 | 5–4 | 1–5 | 4–5 | | 5–3 |
| 6 | Abdel Monem Salem (EGY) | 0 | 5 | 12 | 25 | | 3–5 | 1–5 | 3–5 | 2–5 | 3–5 | |

Source: Official Report, vol. 2, p. 403

==== Round 2 Pool F ====
| Pos | Fencer | W | L | TF | TA | Notes | OL | IA | AP | AS | YNJ | SL |
|---|---|---|---|---|---|---|---|---|---|---|---|---|
| 1 | Olivier Lenglet (FRA) | 4 | 1 | 24 | 15 | Q | | 5–3 | 4–5 | 5–2 | 5–0 | 5.1–5 |
| 2 | Ihab Aly (EGY) | 3 | 2 | 21 | 14 | Q | 3–5 | | 5–1 | 3–5 | 5–2 | 5–1 |
| 3 | Alexander Pusch (FRG) | 3 | 2 | 18 | 18 | Q | 5–4 | 1–5 | | 2–5 | 5–4 | 5–0 |
| 4 | Arno Strohmeyer (AUT) | 3 | 2 | 18 | 18 | | 2–5 | 5–3 | 5–2 | | 1–5 | 5–3 |
| 5 | Yun Nam-jin (KOR) | 2 | 3 | 16 | 19 | | 0–5 | 2–5 | 4–5 | 5–1 | | 5–3 |
| 6 | Sergio Luchetti (ARG) | 0 | 5 | 12 | 25 | | 5–5.1 | 1–5 | 0–5 | 3–5 | 3–5 | |

Source: Official Report, vol. 2, p. 403

==== Round 2 Pool G ====
| Pos | Fencer | W | L | TF | TA | Notes | PB | RM | MB | ZX | LIH | HL |
|---|---|---|---|---|---|---|---|---|---|---|---|---|
| 1 | Philippe Boisse (FRA) | 3 | 2 | 23 | 14 | Q | | 4–5 | 4–5 | 5–2 | 5–2 | 5–0 |
| 2 | Robert Marx (USA) | 3 | 2 | 20 | 18 | Q | 5–4 | | 5–3 | 1–5 | 4–5 | 5–1 |
| 3 | Martin Brill (NZL) | 3 | 2 | 21 | 22 | Q | 5–4 | 3–5 | | 5–4 | 5–4 | 3–5 |
| 4 | Zong Xiangqing (CHN) | 2 | 3 | 18 | 20 | | 2–5 | 5–1 | 4–5 | | 5–4 | 2–5 |
| 5 | Lee Il-Hui (KOR) | 2 | 3 | 20 | 23 | | 2–5 | 5–4 | 4–5 | 4–5 | | 5–4 |
| 6 | Hannes Lembacher (AUT) | 2 | 3 | 15 | 20 | | 0–5 | 1–5 | 5–3 | 5–2 | 4–5 | |

Source: Official Report, vol. 2, p. 404

==== Round 2 Pool H ====
| Pos | Fencer | W | L | TF | TA | Notes | PR | CY | BV | AF | TS | GF |
|---|---|---|---|---|---|---|---|---|---|---|---|---|
| 1 | Philippe Riboud (FRA) | 5 | 0 | 25 | 12 | Q | | 5–3 | 5–0 | 5–3 | 5–2 | 5–4 |
| 2 | Cui Yining (CHN) | 4 | 1 | 23 | 9 | Q | 3–5 | | 5–2 | 5–2 | 5–0 | 5–0 |
| 3 | Bård Vonen (NOR) | 3 | 2 | 17 | 18 | Q | 0–5 | 2–5 | | 5–2 | 5–2 | 5–4 |
| 4 | Ángel Fernández (ESP) | 2 | 3 | 17 | 19 | | 3–5 | 2–5 | 2–5 | | 5–3 | 5–1 |
| 5 | Thierry Soumagne (BEL) | 1 | 4 | 12 | 24 | | 2–5 | 0–5 | 2–5 | 3–5 | | 5–4 |
| 6 | Greger Forslöw (SWE) | 0 | 5 | 13 | 25 | | 4–5 | 0–5 | 4–5 | 1–5 | 4–5 | |

Source: Official Report, vol. 2, p. 404

=== Round 3 ===
==== Round 3 Pool A ====
| Pos | Fencer | W | L | TF | TA | Notes | SC | PR | EB | BV | ST | DP |
|---|---|---|---|---|---|---|---|---|---|---|---|---|
| 1 | Sandro Cuomo (ITA) | 4 | 1 | 22 | 15 | Q | | 5–2 | 5–4 | 2–5 | 5–1 | 5–3 |
| 2 | Philippe Riboud (FRA) | 3 | 2 | 20 | 15 | Q | 2–5 | | 3–5 | 5–3 | 5–0 | 5–2 |
| 3 | Elmar Borrmann (FRG) | 3 | 2 | 22 | 17 | Q | 4–5 | 5–3 | | 5–1 | 3–5 | 5–3 |
| 4 | Bård Vonen (NOR) | 2 | 3 | 17 | 21 | Q | 5–2 | 3–5 | 1–5 | | 3–5 | 5–4 |
| 5 | Stephen Trevor (USA) | 2 | 3 | 14 | 21 | | 1–5 | 0–5 | 5–3 | 5–3 | | 3–5 |
| 6 | Daniel Perreault (CAN) | 1 | 4 | 17 | 23 | | 3–5 | 2–5 | 3–5 | 4–5 | 5–3 | |

Source: Official Report, vol. 2, p. 404

==== Round 3 Pool B ====
| Pos | Fencer | W | L | TF | TA | Notes | AM | NK | BV | DG | SP | JL |
|---|---|---|---|---|---|---|---|---|---|---|---|---|
| 1 | Angelo Mazzoni (ITA) | 5 | 0 | 25 | 5 | Q | | 5–0 | 5–0 | 5–0 | 5.1–5 | 5–0 |
| 2 | Nils Koppang (NOR) | 4 | 1 | 20 | 16 | Q | 0–5 | | 5–4 | 5–4 | 5–2 | 5–1 |
| 3 | Björne Väggö (SWE) | 2 | 3 | 18 | 17 | Q | 0–5 | 4–5 | | 5–2 | 5–0 | 4–5 |
| 4 | Daniel Giger (SUI) | 2 | 3 | 16 | 21 | Q | 0–5 | 4–5 | 2–5 | | 5–4 | 5–2 |
| 5 | Steven Paul (GBR) | 1 | 4 | 16 | 24 | | 5–5.1 | 2–5 | 0–5 | 4–5 | | 5–4 |
| 6 | John Llewellyn (GBR) | 1 | 4 | 12 | 24 | | 0–5 | 1–5 | 5–4 | 2–5 | 4–5 | |

Source: Official Report, vol. 2, p. 404

==== Round 3 Pool C ====
| Pos | Fencer | W | L | TF | TA | Notes | MP | MD | AP | OL | JB | IA |
|---|---|---|---|---|---|---|---|---|---|---|---|---|
| 1 | Michel Poffet (SUI) | 4 | 1 | 23 | 14 | Q | | 5–0 | 3–5 | 5–4 | 5–2 | 5–3 |
| 2 | Michel Dessureault (CAN) | 4 | 1 | 20 | 18 | Q | 0–5 | | 5–4 | 5–4 | 5–4 | 5–1 |
| 3 | Alexander Pusch (FRG) | 3 | 2 | 22 | 14 | Q | 5–3 | 4–5 | | 3–5 | 5–1 | 5–0 |
| 4 | Olivier Lenglet (FRA) | 3 | 2 | 23 | 15 | Q | 4–5 | 4–5 | 5–3 | | 5–1 | 5–1 |
| 5 | Jerri Bergström (SWE) | 1 | 4 | 13 | 22 | | 2–5 | 4–5 | 1–5 | 1–5 | | 5–2 |
| 6 | Ihab Aly (EGY) | 0 | 5 | 7 | 25 | | 3–5 | 1–5 | 0–5 | 1–5 | 2–5 | |

Source: Official Report, vol. 2, p. 404

==== Round 3 Pool D ====
| Pos | Fencer | W | L | TF | TA | Notes | PB | MB | SB | VF | RM | CY |
|---|---|---|---|---|---|---|---|---|---|---|---|---|
| 1 | Philippe Boisse (FRA) | 5 | 0 | 25 | 11 | Q | | 5–3 | 5–2 | 5–2 | 5–3 | 5–1 |
| 2 | Martin Brill (NZL) | 3 | 2 | 21 | 16 | Q | 3–5 | | 5–2 | 3–5 | 5–4 | 5–0 |
| 3 | Stefano Bellone (ITA) | 3 | 2 | 19 | 21 | Q | 2–5 | 2–5 | | 5–4 | 5–3 | 5–4 |
| 4 | Volker Fischer (FRG) | 1 | 4 | 20 | 23 | Q | 2–5 | 5–3 | 4–5 | | 4–5 | 5–5 |
| 5 | Robert Marx (USA) | 1 | 4 | 20 | 24 | | 3–5 | 4–5 | 3–5 | 5–4 | | 5–5 |
| 6 | Cui Yining (CHN) | 0 | 5 | 15 | 25 | | 1–5 | 0–5 | 4–5 | 5–5 | 5–5 | |

Source: Official Report, vol. 2, p. 404

=== Double elimination rounds ===
==== Winners brackets ====
===== Winners group 1 =====
| Round of 16 | | Round of 8 |
| Angelo Mazzoni (ITA) | 10 |
| Volker Fischer (FRG) | 8 | Angelo Mazzoni (ITA) | 9 |
| Björne Väggö (SWE) | 10 | Björne Väggö (SWE) | 10 |
| Olivier Lenglet (FRA) | 8 |

===== Winners group 2 =====
| Round of 16 | | Round of 8 |
| Michel Poffet (SUI) | 9 |
| Stefano Bellone (ITA) | 10 | Stefano Bellone (ITA) | 10 |
| Martin Brill (NZL) | 4 | Michel Dessureault (CAN) | 6 |
| Michel Dessureault (CAN) | 10 |

===== Winners group 3 =====
| Round of 16 | | Round of 8 |
| Philippe Riboud (FRA) | 10 |
| Daniel Giger (SUI) | 10 | Daniel Giger (SUI) | 5 |
| Alexander Pusch (FRG) | 10 | Alexander Pusch (FRG) | 10 |
| Sandro Cuomo (ITA) | 7 |

===== Winners group 4 =====
| Round of 16 | | Round of 8 |
| Elmar Borrmann (FRG) | 8 |
| Nils Koppang (NOR) | 10 | Nils Koppang (NOR) | 8 |
| Bård Vonen (NOR) | 5 | Philippe Boisse (FRA) | 10 |
| Philippe Boisse (FRA) | 10 |

==== Losers brackets ====
===== Losers group 1 =====
| Round of 4 | | Round of 2 |
| Volker Fischer (FRG) | 10 |
| Olivier Lenglet (FRA) | 9 | Volker Fischer (FRG) | 10 |
| | | Michel Dessureault (CAN) | 9 |

===== Losers group 2 =====
| Round of 4 | | Round of 2 |
| Michel Poffet (SUI) | 10 |
| Martin Brill (NZL) | 8 | Michel Poffet (SUI) | 10 |
| | | Daniel Giger (SUI) | 6 |

===== Losers group 3 =====
| Round of 4 | | Round of 2 |
| Philippe Riboud (FRA) | 10 |
| Sandro Cuomo (ITA) | 2 | Philippe Riboud (FRA) | 10 |
| | | Nils Koppang (NOR) | 7 |

===== Losers group 4 =====
| Round of 4 | | Round of 2 |
| Elmar Borrmann (FRG) | 10 |
| Bård Vonen (NOR) | 6 | Elmar Borrmann (FRG) | 10 |
| | | Angelo Mazzoni (ITA) | 7 |

=== Final round ===
Quarterfinals
Philippe Boisse (FRA) | 10
Volker Fischer (FRG) | 6
Philippe Riboud (FRA) | 12
Alexander Pusch (FRG) | 11
Stefano Bellone (ITA) | 10
Michel Poffet (SUI) | 4
Elmar Borrmann (FRG) | 6
Björne Väggö (SWE) | 10

Semifinals
Philippe Boisse (FRA) | 12
Philippe Riboud (FRA) | 11
Stefano Bellone (ITA) | 8
Björne Väggö (SWE) | 10

Finals
Philippe Boisse (FRA) | 10
Björne Väggö (SWE) | 5
Third place
Philippe Riboud (FRA) | 10
Stefano Bellone (ITA) | 7

== Final classification ==
| Fencer | Nation |
|---|---|
| Philippe Boisse | France |
| Björne Väggö | Sweden |
| Philippe Riboud | France |
| Stefano Bellone | Italy |
| Michel Poffet | Switzerland |
| Elmar Borrmann | West Germany |
| Alexander Pusch | West Germany |
| Volker Fischer | West Germany |
| Angelo Mazzoni | Italy |
| Michel Dessureault | Canada |
| Nils Koppang | Norway |
| Daniel Giger | Switzerland |
| Olivier Lenglet | France |
| Sandro Cuomo | Italy |
| Martin Brill | New Zealand |
| Bård Vonen | Norway |
| Stephen Trevor | United States |
| Robert Marx | United States |
| Daniel Perreault | Canada |
| Steven Paul | Great Britain |
| Jerri Bergström | Sweden |
| John Llewellyn | Great Britain |
| Cui Yining | China |
| Ihab Aly | Egypt |
| Zhao Zhizhong | China |
| Arno Strohmeyer | Austria |
| Kim Seong-mun | South Korea |
| Khaled Soliman | Egypt |
| Ángel Fernández | Spain |
| Zong Xiangqing | China |
| Jean-Marc Chouinard | Canada |
| Ali Murat Dizioğlu | Turkey |
| Yun Nam-jin | South Korea |
| Lee Il-Hui | South Korea |
| Hannes Lembacher | Austria |
| Stéphane Ganeff | Belgium |
| Tsai Shing-Hsiang | Chinese Taipei |
| Lee Shelley | United States |
| José Rafael Magallanes | Venezuela |
| Gabriel Nigon | Switzerland |
| Mohamed Al-Thuwani | Kuwait |
| Thierry Soumagne | Belgium |
| Kazem Hasan | Kuwait |
| Greger Forslöw | Sweden |
| Abdel Monem Salem | Egypt |
| Sergio Luchetti | Argentina |
| Stefan Joos | Belgium |
| Gilberto Peña | Puerto Rico |
| Denis Cunningham | Hong Kong |
| David Cocker | New Zealand |
| Marcelo Magnasco | Argentina |
| Jamil Mohamed Bubashit | Saudi Arabia |
| Liu Chi On | Hong Kong |
| Osama Al-Khurafi | Kuwait |
| John Hugo Pedersen | Norway |
| Mohamed Ahmed Abu Ali | Saudi Arabia |
| Lee Tai-Chung | Chinese Taipei |
| Csaba Gaspar | Argentina |
| Rashid Fahd Al-Rasheed | Saudi Arabia |
| Saul Mendoza | Bolivia |
| Jonathan Stanbury | Great Britain |
| James Kerr | Virgin Islands |
| Lam Tak Chuen | Hong Kong |
