= Fencing at the 1984 Summer Olympics – Men's team épée =

Men's team épée at the Games of the XXIII Olympiad
- Venue: Long Beach Convention Center
- Dates: 10–11 August 1984
- Competitors: 75 from 16 nations

Medalists
1st place, gold medalist(s)		Elmar Borrmann; Volker Fischer; Gerhard Heer; Rafael Nickel; Alexander Pusch	West Germany
2nd place, silver medalist(s)		Philippe Boisse; Jean-Michel Henry; Olivier Lenglet; Philippe Riboud; Michel Salesse	France
3rd place, bronze medalist(s)		Stefano Bellone; Sandro Cuomo; Cosimo Ferro; Roberto Manzi; Angelo Mazzoni	Italy

The men's team épée was one of eight fencing events on the fencing at the 1984 Summer Olympics programme. It was the seventeenth appearance of the event. The competition was held from 10 to 11 August 1984. 75 fencers from 16 nations competed.

== Rosters ==
Argentina

- Csaba Gaspar
- Sergio Luchetti
- Marcelo Magnasco
- Sergio Turiace

Canada

- Jacques Cardyn
- Jean-Marc Chouinard
- Alain Côté
- Michel Dessureault
- Daniel Perreault

China

- Cui Yining
- Pang Jin
- Zhao Zhizhong
- Zong Xiangqing

Egypt

- Ihab Aly
- Ahmed Diab
- Abdel Monem Salem
- Khaled Soliman

France

- Philippe Boisse
- Jean-Michel Henry
- Olivier Lenglet
- Philippe Riboud
- Michel Salesse

Great Britain

- Ralph Johnson
- John Llewellyn
- Neal Mallett
- Steven Paul
- Jonathan Stanbury

Hong Kong

- Denis Cunningham
- Lai Yee Lap
- Lam Tak Chuen
- Liu Chi On

Italy

- Stefano Bellone
- Sandro Cuomo
- Cosimo Ferro
- Roberto Manzi
- Angelo Mazzoni

Kuwait

- Osama Al-Khurafi
- Abdul Nasser Al-Sayegh
- Ali Hasan
- Kazem Hasan
- Mohamed Al-Thuwani

Norway

- Paal Frisvold
- Nils Koppang
- John Hugo Pedersen
- Ivar Schjøtt
- Bård Vonen

Saudi Arabia

- Mohamed Ahmed Abu Ali
- Rashid Fahd Al-Rasheed
- Jamil Mohamed Bubashit
- Nassar Al-Dosari

South Korea

- Kim Bong-Man
- Kim Seong-Mun
- Lee Il-Hui
- Min Gyeong-Seung
- Yun Nam-jin

Sweden

- Jerri Bergström
- Greger Forslöw
- Kent Hjerpe
- Jonas Rosén
- Björne Väggö

Switzerland

- Olivier Carrard
- Daniel Giger
- Gabriel Nigon
- Michel Poffet
- François Suchanecki

United States

- Robert Marx
- John Moreau
- Peter Schifrin
- Lee Shelley
- Stephen Trevor

West Germany

- Elmar Borrmann
- Volker Fischer
- Gerhard Heer
- Rafael Nickel
- Alexander Pusch

== Results ==
=== Round 1 ===
==== Round 1 Pool A ====
In the first set of matches, France beat Saudi Arabia 9–0 and China defeated the United States 9–4. The second set saw the winners both win or tie again (securing advancement) and the losers both lose or tie again (resulting in elimination), as France drew against the United States 8–8 (tied 59–59 on touches) and China won against Saudi Arabia 9–0. Finally, France took the top spot in the group by beating China 9–1 while Saudi Arabia finished last after losing to the United States 8–5.

Pos	Team	W	L	BW	BL	Qual.	FRA	CHN	USA	KSA
1	France	2.5	0.5	26	9	Q		9–1	8.59–8.59	9–0
2	China	2	1	19	13	Q	1–9		9–4	9–0
3	United States	1.5	1.5	20	22		8.59–8.59	4–9		8–5
4	Saudi Arabia	0	3	5	26		0–9	0–9	5–8	

Source: Official Report, vol. 2, p. 412

==== Round 1 Pool B ====
In the first set of matches, West Germany beat Hong Kong 9–1 and Great Britain defeated Norway 9–2. The second set saw the winners both win again (securing advancement) and the losers both lose again (resulting in elimination), as West Germany prevailed against Norway 9–2 and Great Britain won against Hong Kong 9–0. Finally, West Germany took the top spot in the group by beating Great Britain 9–3 while Hong Kong finished last after losing to Norway 9–2.

Pos	Team	W	L	BW	BL	Qual.	FRG	GBR	NOR	HKG
1	West Germany	3	0	27	6	Q		9–3	9–2	9–1
2	Great Britain	2	1	21	13	Q	3–9		9–4	9–0
3	Norway	1	2	15	20		2–9	4–9		9–2
4	Hong Kong	0	3	3	27		1–9	0–9	2–9	

Source: Official Report, vol. 2, p. 413

==== Round 1 Pool C ====
In the first set of matches, Italy beat Argentina 9–1 and Canada defeated Egypt 8–0 (with 2 double-losses). The second set saw the winners both win again (securing advancement) and the losers both lose again (resulting in elimination), as Italy prevailed against Egypt 9–0 and Canada won against Argentina 8–3 (2 double losses). Finally, Italy took the top spot in the group by beating Canada 9–5 while Argentina finished last after losing to Egypt 9–4.

Pos	Team	W	L	BW	BL	Qual.	ITA	CAN	EGY	ARG
1	Italy	3	0	27	6	Q		9–5	9–0	9–1
2	Canada	2	1	21	16	Q	5–9		8–0	8–3
3	Egypt	1	2	9	23		0–9	0–8		9–4
4	Argentina	0	3	8	28		1–9	3–8	4–9	

Source: Official Report, vol. 2, pp. 413–14

==== Round 1 Pool D ====
In the first set of matches, Switzerland beat Kuwait 9–3 and South Korea defeated Sweden 7–3 (with 3 double-losses). The second set saw Sweden beat Switzerland 8–4 (2 double-losses) and South Korea prevail against Kuwait 9–1. In the final set, Switzerland defeated South Korea 9–5; this margin put both teams at 2–1 but South Korea led in bouts (21–16 vs. 18–18) and thus secured advancement; Kuwait was also eliminated at 0–2 before its match with Sweden. The match between Sweden and Kuwait would determine whether Sweden or Switzerland advanced; Sweden had already lost 16 bouts going into the match, so (to stay ahead of Switzerland on the first tie-breaker, bouts lost) could lose no more than 2 bouts against Kuwait to advance. Sweden won 9–2, matching Switzerland on bouts lost (18 to 18) but advancing on the second tie-breaker, bouts won (20 to 18).

Pos	Team	W	L	BW	BL	Qual.	KOR	SWE	SUI	KUW
1	South Korea	2	1	21	16	Q		7–3	5–9	9–1
2	Sweden	2	1	20	18	Q	3–7		8–4	9–2
3	Switzerland	2	1	18	18		9–5	4–8		9–3
4	Kuwait	0	3	6	27		1–9	2–9	3–9	

Source: Official Report, vol. 2, p. 414

=== Elimination rounds ===
Fifth place
D2	Sweden	8
A2	China	6
Seventh place
B2	Great Britain	8 (62)
D1	South Korea	8 (69)

Consolation semifinals
B2	Great Britain	4
D2	Sweden	8
D1	South Korea	5
A2	China	8

Quarterfinals
A1	France	9
B2	Great Britain	3
C1	Italy	9
D2	Sweden	2
D1	South Korea	5
C2	Canada	8
B1	West Germany	9
A2	China	2

Semifinals
A1	France	9
C1	Italy	4
C2	Canada	1
B1	West Germany	9

Final
A1	France	5
B1	West Germany	8
Third place
C1	Italy	8
C2	Canada	2
