= New Zealand at the 1984 Summer Olympics =

- IOC code: NZL
- NOC: New Zealand Olympic and Commonwealth Games Association
- Website: www.olympic.org.nz

in Los Angeles, USA
- Competitors: 130 in 18 sports
- Flag bearer: John Walker
- Officials: 59
- Medals Ranked 8th: Gold 8 Silver 1 Bronze 2 Total 11

Summer Olympics appearances (overview)
- 1908; 1912; 1920; 1924; 1928; 1932; 1936; 1948; 1952; 1956; 1960; 1964; 1968; 1972; 1976; 1980; 1984; 1988; 1992; 1996; 2000; 2004; 2008; 2012; 2016; 2020; 2024; 2028

Other related appearances
- Australasia (1908–1912)

New Zealand competed at the 1984 Summer Olympics in Los Angeles, United States. 130 competitors, 98 men and 32 women, took part in 76 events in 18 sports. The country recorded 11 medals, including eight golds, resulting in the nation ranking among the top ten in the medal table for the first time.

== Medal tables ==
Medal	Name	Sport	Event	Date
Gold	Mark Todd	Equestrian	Individual eventing	3 August
Gold	Shane O'Brien; Les O'Connell; Conrad Robertson; Keith Trask	Rowing	Men's coxless four	5 August
Gold	Rex Sellers; Chris Timms	Sailing	Tornado	8 August
Gold	Russell Coutts	Sailing	Finn	8 August
Gold	Ian Ferguson	Canoeing	Men's K-1 500 metres	10 August
Gold	Ian Ferguson; Paul MacDonald	Canoeing	Men's K-2 500 metres	10 August
Gold	Alan Thompson	Canoeing	Men's K-1 1000 metres	11 August
Gold	Grant Bramwell; Ian Ferguson; Paul MacDonald; Alan Thompson	Canoeing	Men's K-4 1000 metres	11 August
Silver	Kevin Barry	Boxing	Light heavyweight	11 August
Bronze	Kevin Lawton; Barrie Mabbott; Don Symon; Ross Tong; Brett Hollister (cox)	Rowing	Men's coxed four	5 August
Bronze	Bruce Kendall	Sailing	Windglider	8 August

Medals by sport
Sport	Gold medal	Silver medal	Bronze medal	Total
Canoeing	4	0	0	4
Sailing	2	0	1	3
Rowing	1	0	1	2
Equestrian	1	0	0	1
Boxing	0	1	0	1
Total	8	1	2	11

Medals by gender
Gender	Gold medal	Silver medal	Bronze medal	Total
Male	5	1	2	8
Female	0	0	0	0
Mixed / open	3	0	0	3
Total	8	1	2	11

== Archery ==
After a twelve-year hiatus from archery, New Zealand returned in 1984 with one man and two women. This included the first paraplegic Olympian, Neroli Fairhall.

Athlete	Event	Round 1						Round 2						Total	Rank
Athlete	Event	30 m	50 m	70 m	90 m	Total	Rank	30 m	50 m	70 m	90 m	Total	Rank	Total	Rank
Neroli Fairhall	Women's individual	326	284	289	268	1167	38	324	280	310	276	1190	32	2357	35
Dale Lightfoot	Men's individual	335	303	292	261	1191	39	334	305	321	266	1226	26	2357	34
Ann Shurrock	Women's individual	329	298	301	290	1218	23	322	304	290	288	1204	28	2422	24

== Athletics ==
=== Track and road ===
Athlete	Event	Heat		Quarterfinal		Semifinal		Final	
Athlete	Event	Result	Rank (Note: Ranks given are within the heat)	Result	Rank	Result	Rank (Note: Ranks given are within the semifinal)	Result	Rank
Anne Audain	Women's marathon	—N/a						DNF	
Rod Dixon	Men's marathon	—N/a						2:12:57	10
Derek Froude	Men's marathon	—N/a						2:19:44	34
Lyn Grime	Women's 400 m hurdles	58.02	5	—N/a		did not advance			
Lorraine Moller	Women's marathon	—N/a						2:28:34	5
Mary O'Connor	Women's marathon	—N/a						2:41:22	27
Peter O'Donoghue	Men's 1500 m	3:40.69	3 Q	—N/a		3:38.71	8	did not advance	
Peter Pearless	Men's 800 m	1:49.95	5	did not advance					
Peter Renner	Men's 3000 m steeplechase	8:22.95	2 Q	—N/a		8:18.12	2 Q	8:29.81	11
Dianne Rodger	Women's 3000 m	8.47.90	5 q	—N/a				8.56.43	9
Tony Rogers	Men's 1500 m	3:39.78	4 q	—N/a		3:36.48	6 q	3:38.98	9
John Walker	Men's 5000 m	13:44.75	2 Q	—N/a		13:28.48	3 Q	13:24.46	8

=== Field ===
Athlete	Event	Qualification		Final	
Athlete	Event	Result	Rank	Result	Rank
Mike O'Rourke	Men's javelin throw	NM		did not advance	
Steve Walsh	Men's long jump	NM		did not advance	

== Boxing ==
Athlete	Event	Round 1	Round 2	Quarterfinals	Semifinals	Final	Rank
Athlete	Event	Opposition Result	Opposition Result	Opposition Result	Opposition Result	Opposition Result	Rank
Kevin Barry	Men's light heavyweight	Smith (TRI); W 5 – 0	Kiriisa (UGA); W 3 – 2	Nanga (CMR); W 4 – 1	Holyfield (USA); W DSQ-2	Josipović (YUG); L WO	2nd place, silver medalist(s)
Michael Kenny	Men's heavyweight	Bye	Owiny (UGA); L RSC-2	did not advance			=9

== Canoeing ==
Athlete	Event	Heats		Repechages		Semifinals		Final	
Athlete	Event	Time	Rank	Time	Rank	Time	Rank	Time	Rank
Grant Bramwell; Ian Ferguson; Paul MacDonald; Alan Thompson	Men's K-4 1000 m	3:05.99	1 Q	—N/a		3:05.67	1 Q	3:02.28	1st place, gold medalist(s)
Ian Ferguson	Men's K-1 500 m	1:49.32	2 Q	—N/a		1:48.00	1 Q	1:47.84	1st place, gold medalist(s)
Ian Ferguson; Paul MacDonald	Men's K-2 500 m	1:36.82	1 Q	—N/a		1:36.10	1 Q	1:34.21	1st place, gold medalist(s)
Robert Jenkinson; Edwin Richards	Men's K-2 1000 m	3:37.69	4 R	3:45.97	3 Q	3:38.80	5	did not advance	
Alan Thompson	Men's K-1 1000 m	3:53.41	1 Q	—N/a		3:58.90	1 Q	3:45.73	1st place, gold medalist(s)

== Cycling ==
Seven cyclists represented New Zealand in 1984.

=== Road ===
Men's individual road race

Athlete	Time	Rank
Stephen Cox	5:15:27	37
Brian Fowler	5:06:45	18
Roger Sumich	DNF	

=== Track ===
Men's 1 km time trial

Athlete	Time	Rank
Craig Adair	1:06.96	5

Men's points race

Athlete	Qualifying			Final		
Athlete	Points	Laps behind	Rank	Points	Laps behind	Rank
Brian Fowler	24	0	2 Q	12	1	7
Graeme Miller	10	1	13	did not advance		

Men's individual pursuit

Athlete	Qualification		Round 1	Quarterfinals	Semifinals	Final	Rank
Athlete	Time	Rank	Opposition Time	Opposition Time	Opposition Time	Opposition Time	Rank
Anthony Cuff	4:55.06	15	Robert (FRA); L 4:50.49	did not advance			11

Men's team pursuit

Athlete	Qualification		Quarterfinals	Semifinals	Final	Rank
Athlete	Time	Rank	Opposition Time	Opposition Time	Opposition Time	Rank
Craig Adair; Anthony Cuff; Brian Fowler; Graeme Miller	4:37.57	13	did not advance			13

Men's sprint

Athlete	Round 1	Round 1 repechage heat	Round 1 repechage final	Round 2	Round 2 repechage	Round 3	Round 3 repechage	Quarterfinals	Semifinals	Final	Rank
Athlete	Opposition Result	Opposition Result	Opposition Result	Opposition Result	Opposition Result	Opposition Result	Opposition Result	Opposition Result	Opposition Result	Opposition Result	Rank
Murray Steele	Sella (ITA); Lyn (ANT); 3 R	Asuncion (PHI); W 12.09 Q	—N/a	Scheller (FRG); L R	Jamur (BRA); W 12.92 Q	Vernet (FRA); Orban (BEL); 2 R	Scheller (FRG); Iannone (ARG); 3	did not advance			

== Diving ==
Athlete	Event	Preliminaries		Final	
Athlete	Event	Points	Rank	Points	Rank
Ann Fargher	Women's 3 m springboard	421.65	13	did not advance	
Mark Graham	Men's 3 m springboard	497.55	18	did not advance	
Gary Lamb	Men's 3 m springboard	477.66	22	did not advance	

== Equestrian ==
=== Eventing ===
Rider	Horse	Event	Dressage		Cross-country		Jumping		Overall	
Rider	Horse	Event	Points	Rank	Points	Rank	Points	Rank	Points	Rank
Andrew Bennie	Jade	Individual	69.40	33	126.40	37	5.00	23	200.80	37
Mary Hamilton	Whist	Individual	63.20	20	26.80	21	8.00	33	98.00	22
Andrew Nicholson	Kahlua	Individual	78.00	45	27.20	22	25.00	40	130.40	28
Mark Todd	Charisma	Individual	51.60	5	0.00	1	0.00	1	51.60	1st place, gold medalist(s)
Andrew Bennie; Mary Hamilton; Andrew Nicholson; Mark Todd	As above	Team	184.20	5	54.00	6	13.00	8	280.00	6

=== Jumping ===
Athlete	Horse	Event	Round 1		Round 2		Overall	
Athlete	Horse	Event	Faults	Rank	Faults	Rank	Faults	Rank
John Cottle	Arturo	Individual	EL		did not advance			

== Fencing ==
Two fencers, both men, represented New Zealand in 1984.

Athlete	Event	Round 1 pool	Quarterfinal pool	Semifinal pool	Final pool	Rank
Athlete	Event	Opposition Result	Opposition Result	Opposition Result	Opposition Result	Rank
Martin Brill	Men's individual épée	Bergström (SWE); L 3 – 5	Marx (USA); L 3 – 5	Boisse (FRA); L 3 – 5	Dessureault (CAN); L 4 – 10	15
Martin Brill	Men's individual épée	Giger (SUI); L 4 – 5	Boisse (FRA); W 5 – 4	Bellone (ITA); W 5 – 2	Poffet (SUI); L 8 – 10	15
Martin Brill	Men's individual épée	Yun (KOR); T 5 – 5	Zong (CHN); W 5 – 4	Marx (USA); W 5 – 4	Eliminated	15
Martin Brill	Men's individual épée	Al-Rasheed (KSA); W 5 – 4	Lee (KOR); W 5 – 4	Cui (CHN); W 5 – 0	Eliminated	15
Martin Brill	Men's individual épée	—N/a	Lembacher (AUT); L 3 – 5	Fischer (FRG); L 3 – 5	Eliminated	15
David Cocker	Men's individual épée	Nigon (SUI); L 2 – 5	did not advance			50
David Cocker	Men's individual épée	Hasan (KUW); L 2 – 5	did not advance			50
David Cocker	Men's individual épée	Kim (KOR); L 4 – 5	did not advance			50
David Cocker	Men's individual épée	Cuomo (ITA); T 5 – 5	did not advance			50
David Cocker	Men's individual épée	Pedersen (NOR); W 5 – 4	did not advance			50

== Field hockey ==
=== Men's tournament ===
Team roster

Jeff Archibald; Husmukh Bhikha; Chris Brown; George Carnoutsos; Peter Daji; Laurie Gallen; Stuart Grimshaw; Trevor Laurence	Maurice Marquet; Grant McLeod; Brent Miskimmin; Peter Miskimmin; Arthur Parkin; Ramesh Patel; Graham Sligo; Robin Wilson

Pool B

- 30 July 1984
  15:30
  New Zealand	3–3	Pakistan
  Daji 5', 68', 70+'	Report	Sardar 15', 46', 51'
  Umpires:
  Santiago Deo (ESP)
  Richard Kentwell (USA)

1 August 1984
08:00

Netherlands	3–1	New Zealand
T. Kruize 17'; J. Kruize 40'; Van Grimbergen 42'	Report	McLeod 52'

Umpires:
Iwo Sakaida (JPN)
Jack Marjanovic (USA)

3 August 1984
13:45

Great Britain	1–0	New Zealand
Cattrall 13'	Report

Umpires:
Santiago Deo (ESP)
Obaidullah (IND)

5 August 1984
08:00

Kenya	1–4	New Zealand
Otambo 49'	Report	P. Miskimmin 14'; Parkin 58'; Daji 62'; Gallen 69'

Umpires:
Richard Kentwell (USA)
Obaidullah (IND)

7 August 1984
15:30

Canada	2–2	New Zealand
Cholakis 4'; Sandhu 66'	Report	Grimshaw 32'; Gallen 35+'

Umpires:
Richard Kentwell (USA)
Alexander Stelter (FRG)

Team	Pld	W	D	L	GF	GA	Pts	Qualification
Great Britain	5	4	1	0	10	5	9	Advance to semi-finals
Pakistan	5	2	3	0	16	7	7	Advance to semi-finals
Netherlands	5	3	1	1	16	9	7	5th–8th place classification
New Zealand	5	1	2	2	10	10	4	5th–8th place classification
Kenya	5	1	0	4	5	14	2	9th–12th place classification
Canada	5	0	1	4	7	19	1	9th–12th place classification

5th–8th Classification round

9 August 1984
08:00

India	1–0	New Zealand
Sharma 54'	Report

Umpires:
Dennis Meredith (AUS)
Iwo Sakaida (JPN)

7th / 8th Place play-off

10 August 1984
15:00

Spain	0–1	New Zealand
	Report	Parkin 37'

Umpires:
Rob Lathouwers (NED)
Richard Kentwell (USA)

New Zealand finished the men's field hockey tournament in seventh place.

=== Women's tournament ===
Team roster

Christine Arthur; Cathy Baker; Robyn Blackman; Mary Clinton; Lesley Elliott; Jane Goulding; Shirley Haig; Harina Kohere	Jan Martin; Jennifer McDonald; Sue McLeish; Sandra Mackie; Lesley Murdoch; Jillian Smith; Isobel Thomson; Barbara Tilden

Round robin

31 July 1984
14:30

Netherlands	2–1	New Zealand
First Half: Boekhorst PC'; Second Half: von Weiler FG'	Report	Second Half: McDonald FG'

Stadium:
Weingart Stadium

2 August 1984
14:30

Australia	3–0	New Zealand
First Half: Sunderland FG'; Heberle PC'; Second Half: Buchanan FG'	Report

Stadium:
Weingart Stadium

4 August 1984
16:15

New Zealand	0–2	United States
	Report	Anders 23', 42'

Stadium:
Weingart Stadium

6 August 1984
16:45

West Germany	1–0	New Zealand
Ott 39'	Report

Stadium:
Weingart Stadium

10 August 1984
09:45

Canada	4–1	New Zealand
Forshaw 1'; Stoyka 19'; Wheatley 21'; Branchaud 68'	Report	Clinton 65'

Stadium:
Weingart Stadium

Team	Pld	W	D	L	GF	GA	Pts	Rank
Netherlands	5	4	1	0	14	6	9	1
West Germany	5	2	2	1	9	9	6	2
United States	5	2	1	2	9	7	5	3
Australia	5	2	1	2	9	7	5	4
Canada	5	2	1	2	9	11	5	5
New Zealand	5	0	0	5	2	12	0	6

New Zealand finished the women's field hockey tournament in sixth place.

== Gymnastics ==
=== Rhythmic ===
Women's individual all-around

Athlete	Qualifying						Final					Total	Rank
Athlete	Hoop	Ball	Clubs	Ribbon	Total	Rank	Hoop	Ball	Clubs	Ribbon	Total	Total	Rank
Tania Moss	8.750	8.850	9.000	8.600	35.200	30	did not advance						

== Judo ==
Athlete	Event	Rank
Shaun O'Leary	Men's lightweight	=19
Graeme Spinks	Men's half-middleweight	=34
Bill Vincent	Men's middleweight	=12

== Rowing ==
Men

Athlete	Event	Heats		Repechage		Semifinals		Final	
Athlete	Event	Time	Rank	Time	Rank	Time	Rank	Time	Rank
Gary Reid	Single sculls	7:27.10	2 R	7:26.12	2 SA/B	7:34.15	5 FB	7:22.63	7
Geoff Horan; Allan Horan	Coxless pair	7:05.44	2 SA/B	Bye		7:02.89	4 FB	7:04.00	9
Les O'Connell; Shane O'Brien; Conrad Robertson; Keith Trask	Coxless four	6:08.41	1 FA	Bye		—N/a		6:03.48	1st place, gold medalist(s)
Kevin Lawton; Don Symon; Barrie Mabbott; Ross Tong; Brett Hollister (cox)	Coxed four	6:27.18	3 SA/B	?	1 FA	—N/a		6:23.68	3rd place, bronze medalist(s)
Nigel Atherfold; Dave Rodger; Roger White-Parsons; George Keys; Greg Johnston; Chris White; Andrew Stevenson; Mike Stanley; Andy Hay (cox)	Eight	5:48.19	1 FA	Bye		—N/a		5:44.14	4

Women

Athlete	Event	Heats		Repechage		Semi-final		Final	
Athlete	Event	Time	Rank	Time	Rank	Time	Rank	Time	Rank
Stephanie Foster	Single sculls	3:51.86	2 R	3:51.19	2 SA/B	4:02.29	4 FB	3:52.20	7

== Sailing ==
Athlete	Event	Race							Net points	Final rank
Athlete	Event	1	2	3	4	5	6	7	Net points	Final rank
Luke Carter; David Mackay (helm)	Flying Dutchman	13.0	21.0	16.0	~~22.0~~	18.0	13.0	10.0	91.0	10
Russell Coutts	Finn	0.0	13.0	3.0	3.0	~~27.0~~	5.7	10.0	34.7	1st place, gold medalist(s)
Simon Daubney; Tom Dodson (helm); Aran Hansen	Soling	~~DNF~~; ~~29.0~~	18.0	23.0	17.0	19.0	11.7	0.0	88.7	11
Peter Evans (helm); Sean Reeves	470	14.0	21.0	16.0	~~DSQ~~; ~~35.0~~	PMS; 35.0	10.0	5.7	101.7	14
Bruce Kendall	Windglider	3.0	5.7	~~DSQ~~; ~~45.0~~	19.0	3.0	5.7	10.0	46.4	3rd place, bronze medalist(s)
Rex Sellers (helm); Chris Timms	Tornado	5.7	3.0	0.0	3.0	0.0	3.0	~~DNS~~; ~~27.0~~	14.7	1st place, gold medalist(s)

== Shooting ==
Men's 50 m rifle, prone

Athlete	Round 1	Round 2	Round 3	Round 4	Round 5	Round 6	Total	Rank
Stephen Petterson	99	97	100	100	98	98	592	=13

Men's 50 m running target

Athlete	Slow run	Fast run	Total	Rank
Tony Clarke	288	270	558	19

Mixed skeet

Athlete	Round 1	Round 2	Round 3	Round 4	Round 5	Round 6	Round 7	Round 8	Total	Rank
John Woolley									189	=26

== Swimming ==
Athlete	Event	Heat		Swim-off		Final	
Athlete	Event	Result	Rank	Result	Rank	Result	Rank
Brett Austin	Men's 100 m breaststroke	1:04.83 NR	15 QB	—N/a		1:05.49	15
Brett Austin	Men's 200 m breaststroke	2:27.25	28	—N/a		did not advance	
Carmel Clark	Women's 100 m backstroke	1:04.57	=8 QSO	1:04.33 NR	1 Q	1:04.47	8
Carmel Clark	Women's 100 m freestyle	1:00.63	28	—N/a		did not advance	
Carmel Clark	Women's 200 m backstroke	2:16.78 NR	8 Q	—N/a		2:17.89	8
Mike Davidson	Men's 200 m freestyle	1:56.20	35	—N/a		did not advance	
Mike Davidson	Men's 400 m freestyle	3:57.88	=16 QB	—N/a		3:58.24	16
Mike Davidson	Men's 1500 m freestyle	15:35.43	14	—N/a		did not advance	
Anna Doig	Women's 100 m butterfly	1:03.15	14 QB	—N/a		1:03.65	16
Anna Doig	Women's 100 m freestyle	1:02.72	39	—N/a		did not advance	
Anna Doig	Women's 200 m butterfly	2:20.81	20	—N/a		did not advance	
Gary Hurring	Men's 100 m backstroke	57.42	4 Q	—N/a		56.90 NR	4
Gary Hurring	Men's 200 m backstroke	2:03.29	3 Q	—N/a		2:03.10 NR	5
Gail Jonson	Women's 200 m butterfly	2:20.55	18	—N/a		did not advance	
Gail Jonson	Women's 200 m individual medley	2:25.00	19	—N/a		did not advance	
Gail Jonson	Women's 400 m individual medley	4:59.92	15 QB	—N/a		4:58.40	15
Paul Kingsman	Men's 100 m backstroke	58.33	13 QB	—N/a		58.19	10
Paul Kingsman	Men's 200 m backstroke	2:06.87	20	—N/a		did not advance	
Anthony Mosse	Men's 100 m butterfly	55.19 NR	7 Q	—N/a		54.93 NR	7
Anthony Mosse	Men's 200 m butterfly	1:59.76	5 Q	—N/a		1:58.75 NR	5
Anthony Mosse	Men's 200 m freestyle	1:54.12 NR	24	—N/a		did not advance	
Paul Kingsman; Brett Austin; Anthony Mosse; Gary Hurring	Men's 4 × 100 m medley relay	3:50.56 NR	9	—N/a		did not advance	

== Synchronised swimming ==
Athlete	Event	Qualifying				Final			
Athlete	Event	Technical	Free	Total	Rank	Technical	Free	Total	Rank
Katie Sadleir; Lynette Sadleir	Women's duet	79.442	85.200	164.642	12	did not advance			

== Weightlifting ==
Athlete	Event	Snatch		Clean & Jerk		Total	Rank
Athlete	Event	Result	Rank	Result	Rank	Total	Rank
Michael Bernard	Men's light heavyweight	137.5	12	175.0	=8	312.5	10
Kevin Blake	Men's heavyweight	140.0	13	177.5	9	317.5	9
Allister Nalder	Men's light heavyweight	142.5	=7	175.0	=8	317.5	8

== Wrestling ==
Athlete	Event	Round 1	Round 2	Round 3	Round 4	Final round	Rank
Athlete	Event	Opposition Result	Opposition Result	Opposition Result	Opposition Result	Opposition Result	Rank
Zane Coleman	Men's welterweight	Sejdiu (YUG); L Fall	D. Schultz (USA); L ST	Eliminated			
Graeme Hawkins	Men's bantamweight	García (ESP); W Fall	Davis (USA); L ST	Guan (CHN); L ST	Eliminated		
Ken Reinsfield	Men's middleweight	Agogo (NGR); W 5 – 1	M. Schultz (USA); L 7 – 16	El-Ashram (EGY); W PS	Rinke (CAN); L 2 – 9	Kim (KOR); L 3 – 10	6

== Officials ==
- Chef de Mission – Ron Scott
- Assistant Chef de Mission – Tay Wilson
- Women's manager – Valerie Young
- Director of medical services – Matt Marshall
- Assistant director of medical services – Dave Gerrard
- Physiotherapists – Mark Oram, Ian Sim, Tony Snell, Marion Thogersen
- Transport officer – Hamish Morison
- Attache – M. Portanova (Tarzana, California)
- Office manager – M. Bolton (Los Angeles, California)
- Archery
  - Section manager – Ivan Powley
  - Assistant manager – Dave Henshaw
- Athletics
  - Section manager – Graeme McCabe
  - Coaches – Arch Jelley, Sylvia Potts
- Boxing section manager – Kevin Barry Sr.
- Canoeing
  - Section manager – Bill Garlick
  - Coaches – Ben Hutchings, Brian Wilson
- Cycling
  - Section manager – Graham Sycamore
  - Road coach – Ron Cheatley
  - Track coach – Wayne Thorpe
  - Mechanic – Peter Goding
- Equestrian
  - Section manager (three-day event) – Peter Herrick
  - Section manager (showjumping) – Hugh Morice
  - Veterinary surgeon – Wallie Niederer
  - Grooms – Trudy Boyce, J. Charlston, Jackie Cottle, D. Frost, H. Gilbert
- Field hockey
  - Section manager (men) – Dave Coulter
  - Section manager (women) – Gladys O'Brien
  - Men's coaches – Brian Maunsell, C. Cameron
  - Women's coach – Wayne Boyd
- Judo section manager – Brian Cloynes
- Rowing
  - Section manager – Dudley Storey
  - Coaches – Harry Mahon, Brian Hawthorne, Richard Webster, Ray Reid
- Sailing
  - Section manager – Ralph Roberts
  - Coach – Bret de Thier
  - Boating – Gray Gibson
- Shooting section manager – Graeme Hudson
- Swimming
  - Section manager – Jacqueline Clarke
  - Coach (swimming) – Hisashi Inomata
  - Coach (diving) – Dennis Gear
- Wrestling section manager – Keith Breeze
