= Argentina at the 1984 Summer Olympics =

- IOC code: ARG
- NOC: Argentine Olympic Committee

in Los Angeles
- Competitors: 81 (71 men and 10 women) in 14 sports
- Flag bearer: Ricardo Ibarra
- Medals: Gold 0 Silver 0 Bronze 0 Total 0

Summer Olympics appearances (overview)
- 1900; 1904; 1908; 1912; 1920; 1924; 1928; 1932; 1936; 1948; 1952; 1956; 1960; 1964; 1968; 1972; 1976; 1980; 1984; 1988; 1992; 1996; 2000; 2004; 2008; 2012; 2016; 2020; 2024

Argentina competed at the 1984 Summer Olympics in Los Angeles, United States, after having boycotted the 1980 Summer Olympics. 81 competitors, 71 men and 10 women, took part in 70 events in 14 sports.

== Athletics ==
Men

Athlete	Events	Heat		Semifinal		Final	
Athlete	Events	Result	Rank	Result	Rank	Result	Rank
Rubén Aguiar	Marathon	N/A				2:31:18	59
Pedro Cáceres	3000 m steeplechase	8:50.02	10	did not advance			
Julio César Gómez	5000 m	14:28.48	11	did not advance			
Julio César Gómez	10000 m	29:58.06	12	N/A		did not advance	
Omar Ortega	1500 m	DNF	–	did not advance			

Women

Athlete	Events	Heat		Semifinal		Final	
Athlete	Events	Result	Rank	Result	Rank	Result	Rank
Liliana Arigoni	High jump	1.80	24	N/A		did not advance	
Beatriz Capotosto	100 m hurdles	13.90	4	did not advance			
Liliana Góngora	1500 m	4:28.02	9	N/A		did not advance	
Liliana Góngora	3000 m	9:41:14	9	N/A		did not advance	

Key

- DNF – Did not finish

== Boxing ==
Athlete	Event	First Round	Second Round	Third Round	Quarterfinals	Semifinals	Final	
Athlete	Event	Opposition Result	Opposition Result	Opposition Result	Opposition Result	Opposition Result	Opposition Result	Rank
Rubén Carballo	Flyweight	Bye	Ramírez (DOM); L (RSC)	did not advance				
Pedro Ruben Decima	Bantamweight	Bye	Mukuta (ZAI); W 5–0	Öner (TUR); W 4–1	Walters (CAN); L 0–5	did not advance		
Daniel Domínguez	Welterweight	Léon (MEX); L 0–5	did not advance					
Gustavo Ollo	Light Middleweight	Bye	Bobadilla (PAR); W 5–0	Zielonka (FRG); L 0–5	did not advance			
Antonio Corti	Middleweight	N/A	Bauer (FRG); W 5–0	Škaro (YUG); L 1–4	did not advance			
Roberto Oviedo	Light Heavyweight	N/A	Bye	Wilson (GBR); L (RSC)	did not advance			

Key

- RSC – Referee stopped contest

== Canoeing ==
Athlete	Event	Heats		Repechage		Semifinals		Final	
Athlete	Event	Time	Rank	Time	Rank	Time	Rank	Time	Rank
Atilio Vásquez	Men's K-1 500 m	1:58.18	7	1:53.71	3 Q	1:56.06	5	did not advance	
Atilio Vásquez	Men's K-1 1000 m	4:03.86	5	4:04.42	2 Q	4:07.15	5	did not advance	

== Cycling ==
=== Road ===
Athlete	Event	Time	Rank
Luis Biera	Men's road race	–	DNF

=== Track ===
Sprints

Athlete	Event	First Round (Repechage)		Second Round (Repechage)	1/8 Finals (Repechage)	Quarterfinals	Semifinals	Finals	
Athlete	Event	Time	Rank	Time	Time	Opposition Result	Opposition Result	Opposition Result	Rank
Marcelo Alexandre	Men's sprint	11.87	1 Q	12.68 Q	12.30 Q	Vails (USA); L 0–2	did not advance		
Claudio Iannone	Men's sprint	11.51	2; 1 Q	11.79 Q	DNQ	did not advance			

Pursuits

Athlete	Event	Qualifying		1st round		Semifinals		Finals	
Athlete	Event	Time	Rank	Opposition Time	Rank	Opposition Time	Rank	Opposition Time	Rank
Pedro Caino	Men's individual pursuit	OVT		Did not advance					
Gabriel Curuchet	Men's individual pursuit	4:55.07	16 Q	Hegg (USA); 4:51.04	2	Did not advance			
Pedro Caino, Gabriel Curuchet, Juan Curuchet, Eduardo Trillini	Men's team pursuit	4:32.25	9	Did not advance					

Points races

Athlete	Event	Qualifying		Finals	
Athlete	Event	Points	Rank	Points	Rank
Juan Curuchet	Men's points race	35 (–1 lap)	2 Q	20 (–1 lap)	5
Juan Carlos Haedo	Men's points race	19 (–1 lap)	7 Q	1 (–3 lap)	20

Time trial

Athlete	Event	Time Speed (Km/h)	Rank
Marcelo Alexandre	Men's time trial	1:07.29; 53.499	7

Key

- DNF – Did not finish
- DNQ – Did not qualify
- OVT – Overtaken

== Diving ==
Athlete	Events	Preliminary		Final	
Athlete	Events	Points	Rank	Points	Rank
Verónica Ribot	Women's platform	324.21	15	did not advance	
Verónica Ribot	Women's springboard	443.25	9 Q	422.52	12

== Equestrian ==
=== Show jumping ===
Individual

Athlete	Horse	Round 1		Round 2			Final	
Athlete	Horse	Penalties	Rank	Penalties	Total	Rank	Penalties	Rank
Justo Albarracín	Collon Cura de Tatu	26.50	40	did not advance				
Martín Mallo	Gonzo	Retired		did not advance				
Eduardo Zone	Cardal	48.25	=46	did not advance				

Team

Athlete	Horse	Round 1		Round 2			Final	
Athlete	Horse	Penalties	Rank	Penalties	Total	Rank	Penalties	Rank
Justo Albarracín; Martín Mallo; Adrián Melosi; Eduardo Zone	Collon Cura de Tatu; Who Knows Lilly; Gonzo; Cardal	85.75	15	Did not advance				

== Fencing ==
Men

Athlete	Event	Preliminary round 1		Preliminary round 2		Preliminary round 3		1/16 finals (Repechage)	1/8 finals (Repechage)	Quarterfinals	Semifinals	Final
Athlete	Event	W–L Record	Group Rank	W–L Record	Overall Rank	W–L Record	Overall Rank	Opposition Result	Opposition Result	Opposition Result	Opposition Result	Opposition Result
José María Casanovas	Sabre	0–5	6	did not advance								
Csaba Gaspar	Individual épée	0–4	4	did not advance								
Sergio Luchetti	Individual épée	2–3	2 Q	0–5	46	did not advance						
Sergio Luchetti	Individual foil	3–2	4 Q	1–3	34	did not advance						
Marcelo Magnasco	Individual épée	1–3	5	did not advance								
Atilio Tass	Sabre	2–3	5 Q	1–3	25	did not advance						
Sergio Turiace	Individual foil	1–4	4 Q	0–4	38	did not advance						
Csaba Gaspar, Sergio Luchetti, Marcelo Magnasco, Sergio Turiace	Team épée	0–3	4	N/A						did not advance		
Csaba Gaspar, Sergio Luchetti, Marcelo Magnasco, Sergio Turiace	Team foil	0–2	3	N/A						did not advance		

Women

Athlete	Event	Preliminary round 1		Preliminary round 2		Preliminary round 3		Round of 32	Round of 16	Quarterfinals	Semifinals	Final
Athlete	Event	W–L Record	Group Rank	W–L Record	Overall Rank	W–L Record	Overall Rank	Opposition Result	Opposition Result	Opposition Result	Opposition Result	Opposition Result
Sandra Giancola	Individual foil	0–6	6	did not advance								
Silvana Giancola	Individual foil	1–5	6	did not advance								
María Alicia Sinigaglia	Individual foil	2–4	5	did not advance								
Sandra Giancola, Silvana Giancola, María Alicia Sinigaglia	Team foil	0–3	4	N/A						did not advance		

== Judo ==
Athlete	Event	Round 1	Round 2	Quarterfinals	Semifinals	Final	Repechage 1	Repechage 2	Repechage 3
Athlete	Event	Opposition Result	Opposition Result	Opposition Result	Opposition Result	Opposition Result	Opposition Result	Opposition Result	Opposition Result
Jorge di Noco	Men's -60 kg	Yeung (HKG); W	Liddie (USA); L	did not advance					
Alejandro Strático	Men's -86 kg	Vincent (NZL); L	did not advance						
Fabián Lannutti	Men's -95 kg	Jensen (DEN); L	did not advance						
Ricardo Andersen	Men's +95 kg	N/A	Nelson (USA); L	did not advance					N/A

== Rowing ==
Athlete(s)	Event	Heats		Repechage		Semifinals		Final	
Athlete(s)	Event	Time	Rank	Time	Rank	Time	Rank	Time	Rank
Ricardo Ibarra	Men's single sculls	7:27.60	1 Q	Bye		7:22.42	2 Q	7:14.59	5
Rubén D'Andrilli; Claudio Guindón	Men's coxless pair	7:00.87	4	7:04.33	2 Q	7:08.35	5	7:05.01	10
Oscar Bonini; Gustavo Calderón; Omar Ferrari; Federico Lungwitz	Men's quadruple sculls	6:28.20	5	6:29.36	4	did not advance			

== Sailing ==
Athlete	Event	Race							Score	Rank
Athlete	Event	1	2	3	4	5	6	7	Score	Rank
Jorge García Velazco	Windglider	23.0	15.0	22.4; YMP	29.0	24.0	21.0	(31.0)	134.4	17
Carlos A. Irigoyen, Gonzalo Heredia	470	(35.0); DSQ	5.7	14.0	19.0	16.0	16.0	20.0	90.7	10
Martín Ferrari, Sergio Sinistri	Tornado	21.0	20.0	18.0	19.0	10.0	20.0	(23.0)	108.0	15
Pedro Ferrero, Alberto Llorens, Carlos Sanguinetti	Soling	21.0	21.0	18.0	5.7	20.0	(23.0)	8.0	93.7	13

Key

- YMP – Yacht materially prejudiced
- DSQ – Disqualified

== Shooting ==
Athlete	Event	Total Points	Rank
Ernesto Alais	Men's 50 m pistol	550	=22
Walter Bauza	Men's 50 m pistol	550	=22
Daniel Felizia	Men's 25 m rapid fire pistol	580	28
Leopoldo Fossati	Men's 25 m rapid fire pistol	578	=32
Firmo Roberti	Skeet	192	=13
Ricardo Rusticucci	Men's 10 m air rifle	577	=20
Ricardo Rusticucci	Men's 50 m rifle prone	588	=30
Ricardo Rusticucci	Men's 50 m rifle three positions	1126	34

== Swimming ==
Athlete	Events	Heat		Final	
Athlete	Events	Time	Rank	Time	Rank
Julio César Falón	Men's 100 m breaststroke	1:07.80	34	did not advance	
Julio César Falón	Men's 200 m breaststroke	2:30.40	34	did not advance	
Fabián Ferrari	Men's 100 m freestyle	53.69	38	did not advance	
Fabián Ferrari	Men's 200 m freestyle	1:59.39	43	did not advance	
Luis Juncos	Men's 100 m butterfly	56.86	30	did not advance	
Luis Juncos	Men's 200 m medley	2:12.83	29	did not advance	
Alejandro Lecot	Men's 400 m freestyle	4:05.74	26	did not advance	
Alejandro Lecot	Men's 1500 m freestyle	15:49.94	20	did not advance	
Alicia María Boscatto	Women's 100 m breaststroke	1:14.45	21	did not advance	
Alicia María Boscatto	Women's 200 m breaststroke	2:36.38	11	did not advance	
Virginia Sachero	Women's 100 m freestyle	1:00.53	27	did not advance	
Virginia Sachero	Women's 200 m freestyle	2:12.32	27	did not advance	

Key

- DSQ – Disqualified

== Volleyball ==
Roster

№	Name	Date of birth	Height	Weight
1	Esteban de Palma	18 January 1967	1.96 m (6 ft 5 in)	90 kg (200 lb)
2	Daniel Castellani	21 March 1961	1.95 m (6 ft 5 in)	83 kg (183 lb)
3	Esteban Martínez	25 September 1961	1.91 m (6 ft 3 in)	87 kg (192 lb)
4	Carlos Wagenpfeil	16 June 1957	1.91 m (6 ft 3 in)	83 kg (183 lb)
5	Daniel Colla	23 February 1964	1.95 m (6 ft 5 in)	80 kg (180 lb)
6	Alejandro Diz	26 March 1965	1.96 m (6 ft 5 in)	90 kg (200 lb)
7	Hugo Conte	14 April 1963	1.97 m (6 ft 6 in)	90 kg (200 lb)
8	Waldo Kantor	11 January 1960	1.78 m (5 ft 10 in)	74 kg (163 lb)
9	Raúl Quiroga	26 January 1962	1.97 m (6 ft 6 in)	93 kg (205 lb)
10	Jon Uriarte	15 October 1961	1.99 m (6 ft 6 in)	91 kg (201 lb)
11	Alcides Cuminetti	19 January 1960	1.90 m (6 ft 3 in)	88 kg (194 lb)
12	Leonardo Wiernes	1 February 1963	1.83 m (6 ft 0 in)	85 kg (187 lb)

Group play

Pos	Team	Pld	W	L	Pts	SW	SL	SR	SPW	SPL	SPR	Qualification
1	Brazil	4	3	1	7	10	4	2.500	191	144	1.326	Semifinals
2	United States	4	3	1	7	9	4	2.250	168	117	1.436	Semifinals
3	South Korea	4	3	1	7	9	6	1.500	203	162	1.253	5th–8th semifinals
4	Argentina	4	1	3	5	7	9	0.778	184	207	0.889	5th–8th semifinals
5	Tunisia	4	0	4	4	0	12	0.000	64	180	0.356	9th place match

July 29, 1984	United States	3–1	Argentina
July 29, 1984	(15–6, 15–7, 10–15, 15–8)

July 31, 1984	Argentina	1–3	Brazil
July 31, 1984	(8–15, 8–15, 18–16, 13–15)

August 4, 1984	Tunisia	0–3	Argentina
August 4, 1984	(9–15, 7–15, 3–15)

August 6, 1984	South Korea	2–3	Argentina
August 6, 1984	(6–15, 16–14, 15–13, 7–15, 12–15)

5th to 8th place classification

August 8, 1984	Japan	1–3	Argentina
August 8, 1984	(15–9, 10–15, 10–15, 11–15)

5th place match

August 10, 1984	South Korea	3–1	Argentina
August 10, 1984	(15–13, 9–15, 15–9, 15–7)

== Wrestling ==
Athlete	Event	Preliminary round	Final
Athlete	Event	Opposition Result	Opposition Result
Daniel Navarrete	Men's freestyle 62 kg	Sartoro (FRA); L La Bruna (ITA); L	Did not advance
Daniel Navarrete	Men's Greco-Roman 62 kg	Gabriel (FRG); L Jalabert (FRA); L	Did not advance
Boris Goldstein	Men's freestyle 68 kg	Betancourt (PUR); L Şeker (TUR); L	Did not advance
Boris Goldstein	Men's Greco-Roman 68 kg	Al-Nakdali (SYR); L Sipilä (FIN); L	Did not advance
Oscar Strático	Men's freestyle 74 kg	Olawale (NGR); L Bambe (CMR); L	Did not advance
Oscar Strático	Men's Greco-Roman 74 kg	Helbing (FRG); L Tallroth (SWE); L	Did not advance

== See also ==
- Argentina at the 1983 Pan American Games
