= Norway at the 1984 Summer Olympics =

- IOC code: NOR
- NOC: Norwegian Olympic Committee

in Los Angeles, United States 28 July - 12 August
- Competitors: 103 (84 men and 19 women) in 17 sports
- Flag bearer: Alf Hansen (rowing)
- Medals Ranked 28th: Gold 0 Silver 1 Bronze 2 Total 3

Summer Olympics appearances (overview)
- 1900; 1904; 1908; 1912; 1920; 1924; 1928; 1932; 1936; 1948; 1952; 1956; 1960; 1964; 1968; 1972; 1976; 1980; 1984; 1988; 1992; 1996; 2000; 2004; 2008; 2012; 2016; 2020; 2024

Other related appearances
- 1906 Intercalated Games

Norway was represented at the 1984 Summer Olympics in Los Angeles by the Norwegian Olympic Committee and Confederation of Sports. Norway returned to the Summer Games after participating in the American-led boycott of the 1980 Summer Olympics. 103 competitors, 84 men and 19 women, took part in 76 events in 17 sports.

== Medalists ==
Medal	Name	Sport	Event	Date
Silver	Grete Waitz	Athletics	Women's marathon	5 August
Bronze	Dag Otto Lauritzen	Cycling	Men's individual road race	29 July
Bronze	Hans Magnus Grepperud; Sverre Løken	Rowing	Men's coxless pair	5 August

== Archery ==
In the third appearance by the nation in the archery competition at the Olympics, Norway was again represented by only one man. He posted Norway's best ranking in Olympic archery history with the 23rd place.

Men's Individual Competition:

- Jan Roger Skyttesæter — 2.465 points (→ 23rd place)

== Athletics ==
Men's Marathon

- Øyvind Dahl — 2:19:28 (→ 33rd place)
- Stig Roar Husby — did not finish (→ no ranking)

Women's Marathon

- Grete Waitz — 2:26:18 (→ Silver Medal)
- Ingrid Kristiansen — 2:27:34 (→ 4th place)
- Bente Moe — 2:40:52 (→ 26th place)

Men's Javelin Throw

- Per Erling Olsen

- Qualification — 87.76 metres
- Final — 78.98 metres (→ 9th place)

- Reidar Lorentzen

- Qualification — 76.62 metres (did not advance, 15th place)

Women's Javelin Throw

- Trine Hattestad

- Round 1 — 62.68 metres
- Final — 64.52 metres (→ 5th place)

Men's Discus Throw

- Knut Hjeltnes

- Round 1 — 60.80 metres (→ advanced to the final)
- Final — 65.28 metres (→ 4th place)

Men's Hammer Throw

- Tore Johnsen – Round 1, 65.72 metres (did not advance)

Men's Decathlon

- Trond Skramstad

- Final Result — 7579 points (→ 17th place)

Men's 20 km walk

- Erling Andersen — 1:25:42 (→ 8th place)

Men's 50 km walk

- Lars Ove Moen — 4:15:12 (→ 13th place)
- Erling Andersen — disqualified (→ no ranking)

== Boxing ==
Men's Light-Welterweight

- Javid Aslam

Men's Light-Middleweight

- Simen Auseth

Men's Heavyweight

- Magne Havnå

== Cycling ==
Ten cyclists represented Norway in 1984.

Men's individual road race

- Dag Otto Lauritzen — +0:21 (→ Bronze Medal)
- Morten Sæther — +0:21 (→ 4th place)
- Atle Kvålsvoll — +6:48 (→ 20th place)
- Hans Petter Ødegård — did not finish (→ no ranking)

Team time trial

- Dag Hopen
- Hans Petter Ødegård
- Arnstein Raunehaug
- Morten Sæther

1000m time trial

- Rolf Morgan Hansen

Women's individual road race

- Unni Larsen — 2:11:14 (→ 4th place)
- Nina Søby — 2:13:28 (→ 18th place)
- Hege Stendahl — 2:13:28 (→ 19th place)

== Diving ==
Men's 3m springboard

- Jon Grunde Vegard – 531.48 (→ did not advance)

Men's 10m platform

- Jon Grunde Vegard – 494.67 (→ 11th place)

Women's 3m springboard

- Tine Tollan – 419.55 (→ did not advance)

Women's 10m platform

- Tine Tollan – 341.31 (→ 12th place)

== Fencing ==
Six fencers, all men, represented Norway in 1984.

Men's foil

- Jeppe Normann

Men's épée

- Nils Koppang
- Bård Vonen
- John Hugo Pedersen

Men's team épée

- Paal Frisvold, Nils Koppang, John Hugo Pedersen, Ivar Schjøtt, Bård Vonen

== Football ==
Men's Team Competition

- Preliminary Round (Group A)

- Norway – Chile 0-0
- Norway – France 1-2
- Norway – Qatar 2-0

- Quarterfinals

- Did not advance

- Team Roster

- ( 1.) Erik Thorstvedt
- ( 2.) Svein Fjælberg
- ( 3.) Terje Kojedal
- ( 4.) Knut Torbjørn Eggen
- ( 5.) Trond Sirevåg
- ( 6.) Per Egil Ahlsen
- ( 7.) Per Edmund Mordt
- ( 8.) Kai Erik Herlovsen
- ( 9.) Stein Gran
- (10.) Tom Sundby
- (11.) Stein Kollshaugen
- (12.) Ola By Rise
- (13.) Joar Vaadal
- (14.) Egil Johansen
- (15.) Jan Berg
- (16.) André Krogsæter
- (17.) Arve Seland

== Judo ==
=== Men's Half-Lightweight ===
- Alfredo Chinchilla

== Swimming ==
Men's 400m Freestyle

- Arne Borgstrøm

- Heat — 3:57.88
- B-Final — 3:57.46 (→ 13th place)

Men's 100m Breaststroke

- Jan-Erick Olsen

- Heat — 1:05.43 (→ did not advance, 21st place)

Men's 200m Breaststroke

- Jan-Erick Olsen

- Heat — 2:25.75 (→ did not advance, 25th place)

Men's 200m Individual Medley

- Arne Borgstrøm

- Heat — 2:08.09
- B-Final — 2:08.03 (→ 14th place)

Men's 400m Individual Medley

- Arne Borgstrøm

- Heat — 4:28.37
- B-Final — 4:28.20 (→ 11th place)

Women's 100m Backstroke

- Lise Lotte Nylund

- Heat — DSQ (→ did not advance, no ranking)

Women's 200m Backstroke

- Lise Lotte Nylund

- Heat — DNS (→ did not advance, no ranking)

Women's 200m Butterfly

- Katrine Bomstad

- Heat — 2:19.46 (→ did not advance, 18th place)

Women's 200m Individual Medley

- Katrine Bomstad

- Heat — 2:19.88
- Final — 2:20.48 (→ 8th place)

- Beda Leirvaag

- Heat — DSQ (→ did not advance, no ranking)

Women's 400m Individual Medley

- Katrine Bomstad

- Heat — 4:52.74
- Final — 4:53.28 (→ 8th place)

- Beda Leirvaag

- Heat — DNS (→ did not advance, no ranking)
