= Saudi Arabia at the 1984 Summer Olympics =

- Flag of Saudi Arabia
- IOC code: KSA (SAU used at these Games)
- NOC: Saudi Arabian Olympic Committee

in Los Angeles
- Competitors: 37 in 5 sports
- Flag bearer: Safaq Al-Anzi
- Medals: Gold 0 Silver 0 Bronze 0 Total 0

Summer Olympics appearances (overview)
- 1972; 1976; 1980; 1984; 1988; 1992; 1996; 2000; 2004; 2008; 2012; 2016; 2020; 2024

Saudi Arabia competed at the 1984 Summer Olympics in Los Angeles, United States. The nation returned to the Olympic Games after participating in the American-led boycott of the 1980 Summer Olympics. 37 competitors, all men, took part in 11 events in 5 sports.

== Archery ==
In the first time the nation competed in archery at the Olympics, Saudi Arabia entered three men. They only narrowly avoided being the three lowest placing competitors as Mansour Hamaid was able to score one point higher than Lhendup Tshering of Bhutan.

Men's Individual Competition:

- Mansour Hamaid – 1998 points (→ 59th place)
- Faisal al Basam – 1993 points (→ 61st place)
- Yousef Jawdat – 1716 points (→ 62nd place)

== Cycling ==
Six cyclists represented Saudi Arabia in 1984.

Individual road race

- Abdullah Al-Shaye — did not finish (→ no ranking)
- Hassan Al-Absi — did not finish (→ no ranking)
- Ali Al-Ghazawi — did not finish (→ no ranking)
- Mohammed Al-Shanqiti — did not finish (→ no ranking)

Team time trial

- Hassan Al-Absi
- Ahmed Al-Saleh
- Mohammed Al-Shanqiti
- Rajab Moqbil

== Fencing ==
Seven fencers represented Saudi Arabia in 1984.

Men's foil

- Majed Abdul Rahim Habib Ullah
- Khaled Fahd Al-Rasheed
- Abdullah Al-Zawayed

Men's épée

- Jamil Mohamed Bubashit
- Mohamed Ahmed Abu Ali
- Rashid Fahd Al-Rasheed

Men's team épée

- Mohamed Ahmed Abu Ali, Rashid Fahd Al-Rasheed, Jamil Mohamed Bubashit, Nassar Al-Dosari

== Football ==
Men's Team Competition

- Preliminary Round (Group C)

- Saudi Arabia – Brazil 1 – 3
- Saudi Arabia – Morocco 0 – 1
- Saudi Arabia – West Germany 0 – 6

- Quarter Finals

- → Did not advance

- Team Roster:

- ( 1.) Mohamed Al-Husain
- ( 2.) Sameija Al-Dawasare
- ( 3.) Hassen Bishy
- ( 4.) Sameer Abdulshakor
- ( 5.) Abdullah Masod
- ( 6.) Ahmad Al-Bishi
- ( 7.) Shayemsh Al-Nasisah
- ( 8.) Ahamed Bayazid
- (10.) Fahed Mosaibeeh
- (11.) Mehaisen Al-Dosari
- (12.) Salman Al-Dosari
- (13.) Mohammed Abduljawad
- (14.) Saleh Al-Dossary
- (15.) Nawaf Al-Khamees
- (16.) Omar Bakhshwein
- (21.) Abdullah Al-Deayee
- ( 9.) Majed Abdullah
