= Alais (surname) =

Alais is a surname. Notable people with the surname include:

- Ernesto Alais (1929–2016), Argentine sport shooter
- John Alais (c.1778–1847), British engraver

== See also ==
- Alès, in France
- Alexie Alaïs (born 1994), French athlete
