= Rafael Nickel =

German fencer

Personal information
- Born: 30 July 1958 (age 67) Hamburg, West Germany

Sport
- Sport: Fencing
Medal record
Men's fencing
Representing West Germany
Olympic Games
Gold medal – first place	1984 Los Angeles	Épée, team

Rafael Nickel (born 30 July 1958) is a German fencer. He won a gold medal in the team épée event at the 1984 Summer Olympics.
