= Tsai Shing-hsiang =

Taiwanese fencer

Personal information
- Native name: 吳再富
- Born: 31 August 1960 (age 65)

Sport
- Sport: Fencing

Tsai Shing-hsiang
- Traditional Chinese: 蔡興祥
- Simplified Chinese: 蔡兴祥
Transcriptions
Standard Mandarin
- Hanyu Pinyin: Cài Xīngxiáng
- Wade–Giles: Ts'ai Hsing-hsiang
Yue: Cantonese
- Jyutping: Coi3 Hing1 Coeng4

Tsai Shing-hsiang (simplified Chinese: 蔡兴祥; traditional Chinese: 蔡興祥; pinyin: Cài Xīngxiáng; born 31 August 1960) is a Taiwanese fencer. He competed in the individual foil and épée events at the 1984 Summer Olympics.

== Biography ==
Tsai represented Chinese Culture University in April 1982 at the National College Fencing Championships (Chinese: 全國大專院校擊劍錦標賽), placing first in the men's individual foil event. In November 1982, Tsai competed in the Zhongzheng Cup Fencing Competition (Chinese: 中正杯擊劍錦標賽) held at Fu Jen Catholic University. He placed third in the adult men's foil category. That month, Tsai placed third in the men's sabre event at Taipei City's Zhongzheng Cup Fencing Competition (Chinese: 中正盃擊劍比賽) held at Taipei Municipal Chien Kuo High School. In January 1983, he represented Taiwan in the China Cup International Fencing Invitational Tournament (Chinese: 華夏杯國際擊劍邀請賽). Tsai placed fifth in the men's foil event and third in the men's épée event. To prepare for the competition, he underwent two weeks of training at the National Sports Training Center and was trained by the Italian fencing coach Pierluigi Chicca. 41 male and female fencers from Australia, Hong Kong, South Korea, and Taiwan competed in the tournament, which was held at Taipei First Girls' High School. Tsai coached Huang Wen-chin (Chinese: 黃文津), a deaf and mute student at the National Taiwan University of Arts, in fencing in 1983.

In April 1983, Tsai represented Chinese Culture University at the National College Fencing Championships (Chinese: 全國大專院校擊劍錦標賽), placing second in the individual épée event. That month, he participated in a preliminary competition to qualify for fencing at the 1984 Summer Olympics. He was among the eight fencing candidates shortlisted and was chosen for the épée event. He was coached by a man who had coached the Italian and West German national teams and the Hong Kong coach Chan Wah-hee (Chinese: 陳華熙). Tsai passed another Olympics selection in November 1983 and the final selection in February 1984. During the men's foil event at the 1984 Olympics, Tsai competed in group nine and was eliminated after losing every match. He also competed in the épée event at the Olympics. Tsai was selected to represent Taiwan at the New York International Class A Saber Competition (Chinese: 紐約國際A級軍刀賽) in 1987.
