= Cosimo Ferro =

Italian fencer

Personal information
- Born: 8 June 1962 (age 64) Catania, Italy

Sport
- Sport: Fencing
Medal record
Men's fencing
Representing Italy
Olympic Games
Bronze medal – third place	1984 Los Angeles	Épée, team

Cosimo Ferro (born 8 June 1962) is an Italian fencer. He won a bronze medal in the team épée event at the 1984 Summer Olympics.
