= Gerhard Heer =

German fencer (born 1955)

Personal information
- Born: 19 December 1955 (age 70) Tauberbischofsheim, West Germany

Sport
- Sport: Fencing
Medal record
Men's fencing
Representing West Germany
Olympic Games
Gold medal – first place	1984 Los Angeles	Épée, team

Gerhard Heer (born 19 December 1955) is a German former fencer. He won a gold medal in the team épée event at the 1984 Summer Olympics.
