= Roberto Manzi =

Italian fencer

Personal information
- Born: 21 March 1959 (age 67) Rimini, Emilia-Romagna, Italy

Sport
- Sport: Fencing
Medal record
Men's fencing
Representing Italy
Olympic Games
Bronze medal – third place	1984 Los Angeles	Team épée
World Championships
Silver medal – second place	1985 Barcelona	Team épée
Bronze medal – third place	1983 Vienna	Team épée
Summer Universiade
Gold medal – first place	1983 Edmonton	Team épée
Silver medal – second place	1985 Kobe	Individual épée
Bronze medal – third place	1985 Kobe	Team épée

Roberto Manzi (born 21 March 1959) is an Italian fencer and lawyer. Manzi won a bronze medal in the team épée event at the 1984 Summer Olympics.

Manzi was born in Rimini, Emilia-Romagna, on 21 March 1959. His father, Luciano Manzi, also a lawyer, was a councillor on the municipal and provincial councils, as well as Vice-President of Banca Carim and president of Rimini's hospital institutes. Manzi has a sister, Isabella, who is also a lawyer.

Manzi studied at Rimini's classical lyceum, graduating in 1978. Before his 1984 Olympic win, he won gold and silver medals at the Universiade.

After his Olympic win, Manzi became a lawyer. Among his specialisms are regulations pertinent to beach establishments and their activities, including lifeguards. He sat on the General Council of Banca Carim from 2016.
