= Kent Hjerpe =

Swedish fencer

Personal information
- Born: 30 August 1958 (age 67) Stockholm, Sweden

Sport
- Country: Sweden
- Event: épée
- Club: Djurgårdens IF
- Retired: yes

Kent Johan Erik Hjerpe (born 30 August 1958) is a Swedish fencer. He competed in the team épée event at the 1984 Summer Olympics.

Hjerpe represented Djurgårdens IF.
