= Fabián Ferrari =

Argentine swimmer

Personal information
- Born: 29 October 1964 (age 61)

Sport
- Sport: Swimming

Fabián Ferrari (born 29 October 1964) is an Argentine swimmer. He competed in two events at the 1984 Summer Olympics.
