= James Kerr (fencer) =

United States Virgin Islands fencer (1940–2023)

Personal information
- Born: August 17, 1940 Plainfield, New Jersey, U.S.
- Died: May 7, 2023 (aged 82) Los Angeles, California, U.S.

Sport
- Sport: Fencing

James Lancefield Kerr (August 17, 1940 – May 7, 2023) was a fencer from the United States Virgin Islands. He competed in the individual épée event at the 1984 Summer Olympics.
