= Gilberto Peña =

Puerto Rican fencer

Personal information
- Born: 5 May 1943 (age 83) Juncos, Puerto Rico

Sport
- Sport: Fencing

Gilberto Peña Ortíz (born 5 May 1943) is a Puerto Rican fencer. He competed in the individual épée events at the 1976 and 1984 Summer Olympics.

Peña has also featured with participation in the following Games: From 1966 to 1986 at the Central American and Caribbean Games. In 1966, in Puerto Rico, as a member of the Sword Team. In 1973, at the Central American Fencing Championships, with the Team in Sword they won Bronze Medal. In 1974, in the Central American Championship, Mexico, in individual and team performance, he achieved 2 Bronze, being the Wrath. Individual that Puerto Rico obtains in Central American Championships. At the 1975 Pan American Games, with an 8th. "Best Fencing Demonstration" at Pan American Games. In 1967 Gilberto Peña obtained his Bachelor degree in Humanities from the University of Puerto Rico.
