= Olivier Lenglet =

French fencer (born 1960)

Personal information
- Born: 20 February 1960 (age 66) Saint-Quentin, Aisne, France

Sport
- Sport: Fencing
Medal record
Men's fencing
Representing France
Olympic Games
Gold medal – first place	1988 Seoul	Team épée
Silver medal – second place	1984 Los Angeles	Team épée
World Championships
Gold medal – first place	1982 Rome	Team épée
Gold medal – first place	1983 Vienna	Team épée
Silver medal – second place	1990 Lyon	Team épée
Silver medal – second place	1991 Budapest	Team épée
Bronze medal – third place	1986 Sofia	Team épée
Mediterranean Games
Silver medal – second place	1991 Athens	Individual épée
Summer Universiade
Silver medal – second place	1981 Bucharest	Individual épée
Bronze medal – third place	1981 Bucharest	Team épée

Olivier Serge Lenglet (born 20 February 1960) is a French fencer. He won a gold medal in the team épée at the 1988 Summer Olympics and a silver in the same event at the 1984 Summer Olympics. He also won a silver medal at the 1991 Mediterranean Games.
