= Mansour Hamaid =

Saudi Arabian archer

Personal information
- Nationality: Saudi Arabia
- Born: 12 December 1967 (age 57)

Sport
- Sport: Archery

Mansour Hamaid (born 15 May 1967) is a Saudi Arabian archer. He competed in the 1984 Summer Olympics.
