= Julio César Falón =

Argentine swimmer

Personal information
- Born: 11 November 1964 (age 61)

Sport
- Sport: Swimming

Julio César Falón (born 11 November 1964) is an Argentine swimmer. He competed in two events at the 1984 Summer Olympics.
