= Philippe Boisse =

French fencer (born 1955)

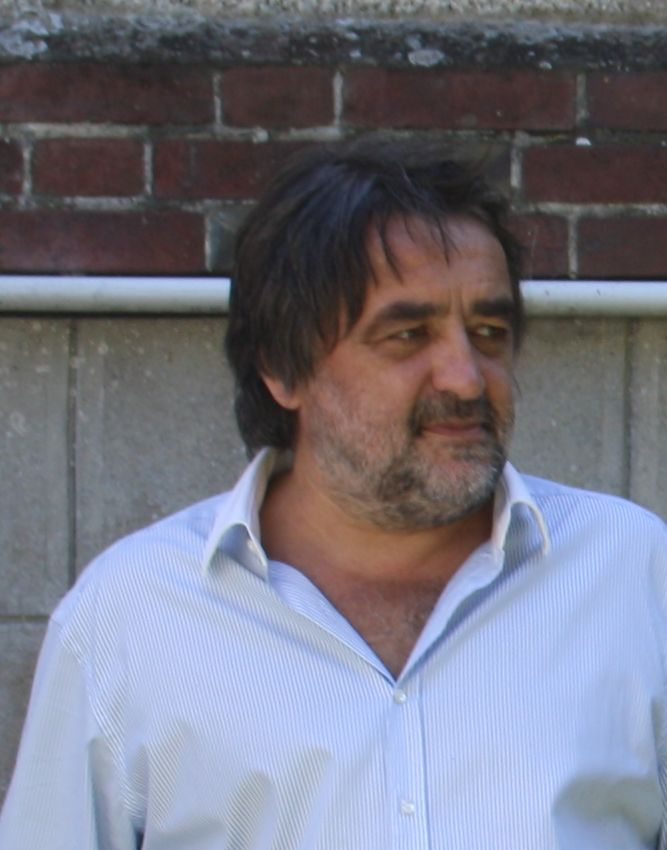

Personal information
- Born: 18 March 1955 (age 71)

Sport
- Sport: Fencing
Medal record
Men's fencing
Representing France
Olympic Games
Gold medal – first place	1980 Moscow	Team épée
Gold medal – first place	1984 Los Angeles	Individual épée
Silver medal – second place	1984 Los Angeles	Team épée

Philippe Boisse (born 18 March 1955) is a French fencer. He won a gold medal in the team épée event at the 1980 Summer Olympics and the individual épée at the 1984 Summer Olympics. He also won a silver in the team épée in 1984.

He is currently a vice-president of the French Fencing Federation, and a practicing physician (radiology).

He is the father of Érik Boisse, a 2004 Olympics gold medal winner in men's team épée.
