= Arne Borgstrøm =

Norwegian swimmer

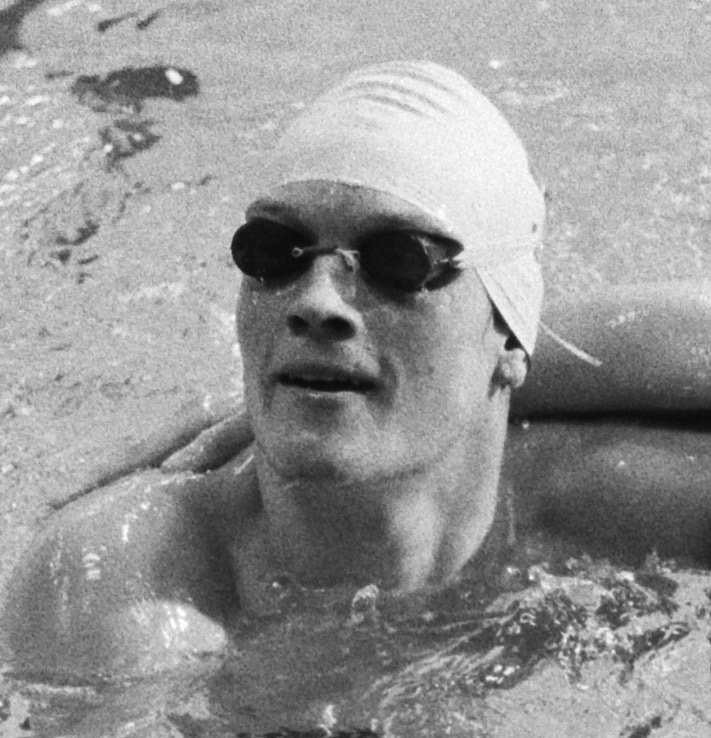
- Arne Borgstrom (1977)

Personal information
- Nationality: Norwegian
- Born: 19 January 1959 (age 67) Odda Municipality, Norway

Sport
- Country: Norway
- Sport: Swimming
- Club: Odda IL

Arne Borgstrøm (born 19 January 1959) is a retired Norwegian freestyle and medley swimmer.

He was born in Odda Municipality, Norway. He competed at the 1976 Summer Olympics in Montreal and at the 1984 Summer Olympics in Los Angeles.

He won 73 Norwegian titles and ten Nordic titles between 1976 and 1984.
