= Jan-Erick Olsen =

Norwegian swimmer

Personal information
- Born: October 12, 1965 (age 60) New York City, United States

Sport
- Sport: Swimming
- Strokes: Breaststroke
- Club: Odda IL

Jan-Erick Olsen (born 12 October 1965) is a Norwegian breaststroke swimmer. He was born in New York City. He competed at the 1984 Summer Olympics in Los Angeles and at the 1988 Summer Olympics in Seoul. He represented the club Odda IL.
