= Jonas Rosén =

Swedish fencer

Personal information
- Born: 13 March 1958 (age 68) Spånga, Stockholm, Sweden

Sport
- Sport: Fencing
- Club: Djurgårdens IF Fäktförening

Jonas Gustav Rosén (born 13 March 1958) is a Swedish fencer. He competed in the team épée event at the 1984 Summer Olympics.

Rosén represented Djurgårdens IF.
