= Carlos Irigoyen =

Argentine sailor (born 1950)

Personal information
- Nationality: Argentine
- Born: 29 August 1960 (age 65)

Sport
- Sport: Sailing

Carlos Irigoyen (born 29 August 1960) is an Argentine sailor. He competed at the 1984 Summer Olympics and the 1988 Summer Olympics.
