= Elmar Borrmann =

German fencer (born 1957)

Personal information
- Born: 18 January 1957 (age 69) Stuttgart, West Germany

Sport
- Sport: Fencing
Medal record
Men's fencing
Representing West Germany
Olympic Games
| Gold medal – first place | 1984 Los Angeles | Épée, team |
| Silver medal – second place | 1988 Seoul | Épée, team |
Representing Germany
| Gold medal – first place | 1992 Barcelona | Épée, team |

Elmar Borrmann (born 18 January 1957) is a German fencer. He won a gold and silver medal in the team épée event for West Germany in 1984 and 1988 and a gold in the same event for Germany in 1992.

== Biography ==
Elmar Borrmann attended the Kaufmännische Schule Tauberbischofsheim and fought for the Fencing-Club Tauberbischofsheim.
