= Carlos Wagenpfeil =

Argentine volleyball player (born 1957)

Personal information
- Full name: Carlos Enrique Wagenpfeil
- Born: 6 June 1957 (age 68); Buenos Aires, Argentina
- Height: 191 cm (6 ft 3 in)
- Weight: 83 kg (183 lb)

Sport
- Country: Argentina
- Sport: Volleyball

Carlos Enrique Wagenpfeil (born 6 June 1957) is an Argentine former volleyball player. He competed in the men's tournament at the 1984 Summer Olympics.
