= John Alais =

British engraver (c. 1778–1847)

- Born: 1778; London
- Died: 12 October 1847 (aged 68–69)
- Burial place: Buenos Aires, Argentina
- Occupation: engraver

John Alais (born c. 1778 in London; died 12 October 1847, in Buenos Aires, Argentina) was a skilled engraver working in London and Argentina.

== Career in London ==
In 1792 John Alais, aged 14, was apprenticed to George Graham of Chelsea, stipple engraver and watercolourist. Very little is known of his antecedents or early career but his later emigration to Argentina may imply he had family there. In 1799 he married Jane Browning at St. Martin-in-the-Fields, Westminster, London, and they had a total of ten children. In 1802 he took as his apprentice George Palmer, by which time he had moved out of noisome central London across the river Thames to the then rural area of Battersea Fields.

John Alais, like his near contemporary, Francesco Bartolozzi, used the stipple technique which was a mixture of etching and engraving on metal plates, using a roulette, a punch and a curved burin for flickwork. This gave a softer and more subtle effect than the line technique mostly employed by the cartoonists of the time such as Thomas Rowlandson and James Gilray. He seems to have worked with various artists including George Cruikshank and Adam Buck, but at least between 1802 and 1815 was published almost exclusively by John Roach of The Britannia Office, Russell Court, Drury Lane, London. He became known for producing portraits of actors and actresses, particularly those appearing at the Drury Lane and Covent Garden theatres, thus leaving a large contribution to the history of London theatre. However, he was sought for reproduction of their works which would increase their income. This was the beginning of the era when the middle classes wanted art on their walls; if they could not afford originals, they could and did buy engravings.

== Career in Argentina ==
Some time after 1826 he left England and went out to Argentina with most of his family. One writer declares that he was "called upon" by Bernardino Rivadavia. It is possible that the two men met in London where the first President of Argentina had his portrait painted by Turner. His reputation followed him: coming across two of his sons in San Pedro, the traveller, J.A. Beaumont described their father as "an engraver and mechanic of considerable achievement, well-known in London."

Besides spending time teaching his technique, Alais continued engraving in Argentina and, although less tangible evidence is to be found of his work, it was obviously well thought of and his reputation is known there to this day. He has been described as "a precursor of engraving technique in Argentina". He was commissioned by the translator (Iriarte) to provide the engraving of Lord Chesterfield in the first edition (1833) of Chesterfield's Letters, He also produced portraits of General Tomás de Iriarte himself and of General Juan Manuel de Rosas.

When he abandoned London for Argentina, John Alais left behind only a married daughter and his eldest son, William Wolfe Alais who was already himself becoming known as an artist and engraver. Two of John's English-born grandsons, William John and Alfred Clarence Alais, were very well-known engravers, and a great-grandson, Ernest William Wolfe Alais, was not only an engraver but a writer of children's and Sexton Blake stories. A grandson born in Argentina, Juan Alais, was a famous guitarist and composer.

== List of works ==
Folger Shakespeare Library, Washington D.C.

- Twenty-two of his engravings of actors in role

Victoria & Albert Museum; Harry R. Beard Collection

- Mrs Yates (after Rose Emma Drummond) 1818 S.3033-2013
- Miss Walstein (after Samuel Houghton) 1815 S.2779-2013
- Mme. Saqui performing on the tightrope at Vauxhall Gardens (after John Bell) 1820 S.0126-3861

Victoria & Albert Museum; Theatre & Performance Collection

- Mrs. Frances Alsop (after Rose Emma Drummond) 1818, pub. La Belle Assemblee, S.1166-2012
- Mr. Kemble & Mrs Siddons as Jaffier and Belvedera (after Samuel Buck) 1765 S.1249-2013

Victoria & Albert Museum; Gabriel Enthoven Collection

- Miss Clara Fisher (after Rose Emma Drummond) 1818 S.450-2015

Royal Collection

- Elizabeth Edwin as Miss Hoyden 1811 hoyden
- HRH The Duchess of Cambridge 1818
- Mrs. H. Johnston 1803
- Miss Tyrer as Queen Dollolla inTom Thumb 1808
- Mrs. Billington as Mandane 1818
- Edmund Spenser 1805
- R.W. Elliston as Ben Block 1805
- R.W. Elliston as Don Felix 1805
- William Dowton as Francisco 1805
- W.T. Lewis as The Copper Captain 18084
- Mrs. Powell as Euphrasia 1807
- Samuel Thomas Russell as Jerry Sneak 1809
- R.W. Elliston & Mrs. Jordan as Beverley and Belinda 1808

National Portrait Gallery Collection

- Robert William Elliston & Dorothy Jordan as Beverley and Belinda in Murphy's "All in the Wrong" 1808
- Sir Astley Paston Cooper 1st Bt. 1824 (after Joseph William Rubidge) 1824

National Gallery of Scotland Collection

- Victoria Maria Louise of Saxe-Coburg, Duchess of Kent (after John Partridge)

National Trust Collection

- The Rt. Hon. William Windham III MP after Sir Thomas Lawrence, at Felbrigg, Norfolk

British Museum Collection

- Waltzing after J.H.A. Randal

Miscellaneous

- Juvenile Opposition (after F. Wheatley)
- Juvenile Reluctance (after F. Wheatley)
- Prompt books for productions of Shakespeare's As You Like It (1804) and Hamlet and Othello (1814).
