= Min Gyeong-seung =

South Korean fencer

Personal information
- Born: 10 February 1962 (age 64)

Sport
- Sport: Fencing

Min Gyeong-seung (born 10 February 1962) is a South Korean fencer. He competed in the team épée event at the 1984 Summer Olympics.
