= Björne Väggö =

Swedish fencer

Personal information
- Born: 9 September 1955 (age 71) Malmö, Sweden

Sport
- Sport: Fencing
- College team: Notre Dame
Medal record
Men's fencing
Representing Sweden
Olympic Games
Silver medal – second place	1984 Los Angeles	Individual épée
Summer Universiade
Gold medal – first place	1981 Bucharest	Individual épée

Björne Väggö (born 9 September 1955) is a Swedish fencer. He won a silver medal in the individual épée event at the 1984 Summer Olympics. He is discussed in "Epee 2.0: The Birth Of The New Fencing Paradigm", and is a contributor to the revised edition: "Epee 2.5: The New Paradigm Revised and Augmented".

== Awards ==
- (Sweden) Swedish Fencing Federation Royal Medal of Merit in gold (Svenska fäktförbundets kungliga förtjänstmedalj i guld) (2011)

== See also ==
- List of NCAA fencing champions
