= Ali Murat Dizioğlu =

Turkish fencer

Personal information
- Born: 27 September 1963 (age 62)

Sport
- Sport: Fencing

Ali Murat Dizioğlu (born 27 September 1963) is a Turkish fencer. He competed in the individual épée event at the 1984 Summer Olympics.
