= Leonardo Wiernes =

Argentine volleyball player (born 1963)

Personal information
- Nationality: Argentine
- Born: 1 February 1963 (age 62)

Sport
- Sport: Volleyball

Leonardo Wiernes (born 1 February 1963) is an Argentine volleyball player. He competed in the men's tournament at the 1984 Summer Olympics.
