= Jon Grunde Vegard =

Norwegian diver

Personal information
- Born: 15 November 1957 (age 68) Tønsberg, Norway

Sport
- Sport: Diving

Jon Grunde Vegard (born 15 November 1957) is a Norwegian diver.

== Personal life ==
Born in Tønsberg, on 15 November 1957, Vegar is a son of diver and coach Grunde Vegard.

== Career ==
Vegard represented the clubs Hamar IL, Spinn, Tønsberg, and Tønsberg SK. He won a total of 68 national titles in diving between 1972 and 1996, and was awarded the Kongepokal trophy in 1983. He won 35 titles in springboard, 27 in platform diving, and 6 in combined.

He competed at the 1984 Summer Olympics in Los Angeles, in both platform, where he placed 11th, and in springboard.

He has been credited for introducing the chamois leather cloth to the diving sport.
