= Alcides Cuminetti =

Argentine volleyball player (born 1960)

Personal information
- Nationality: Argentine
- Born: 19 January 1960 (age 65)

Sport
- Sport: Volleyball

Alcides Cuminetti (born 19 January 1960) is an Argentine volleyball player. He competed in the men's tournament at the 1984 Summer Olympics.
