= Ivar Schjøtt =

Norwegian fencer

Personal information
- Born: 28 December 1955 (age 70) Bergen, Norway

Sport
- Sport: Fencing

Ivar Schjøtt (born 28 December 1955) is a Norwegian fencer. He competed in the team épée event at the 1984 Summer Olympics.
