= Sandro Cuomo =

Italian fencer (born 1962)

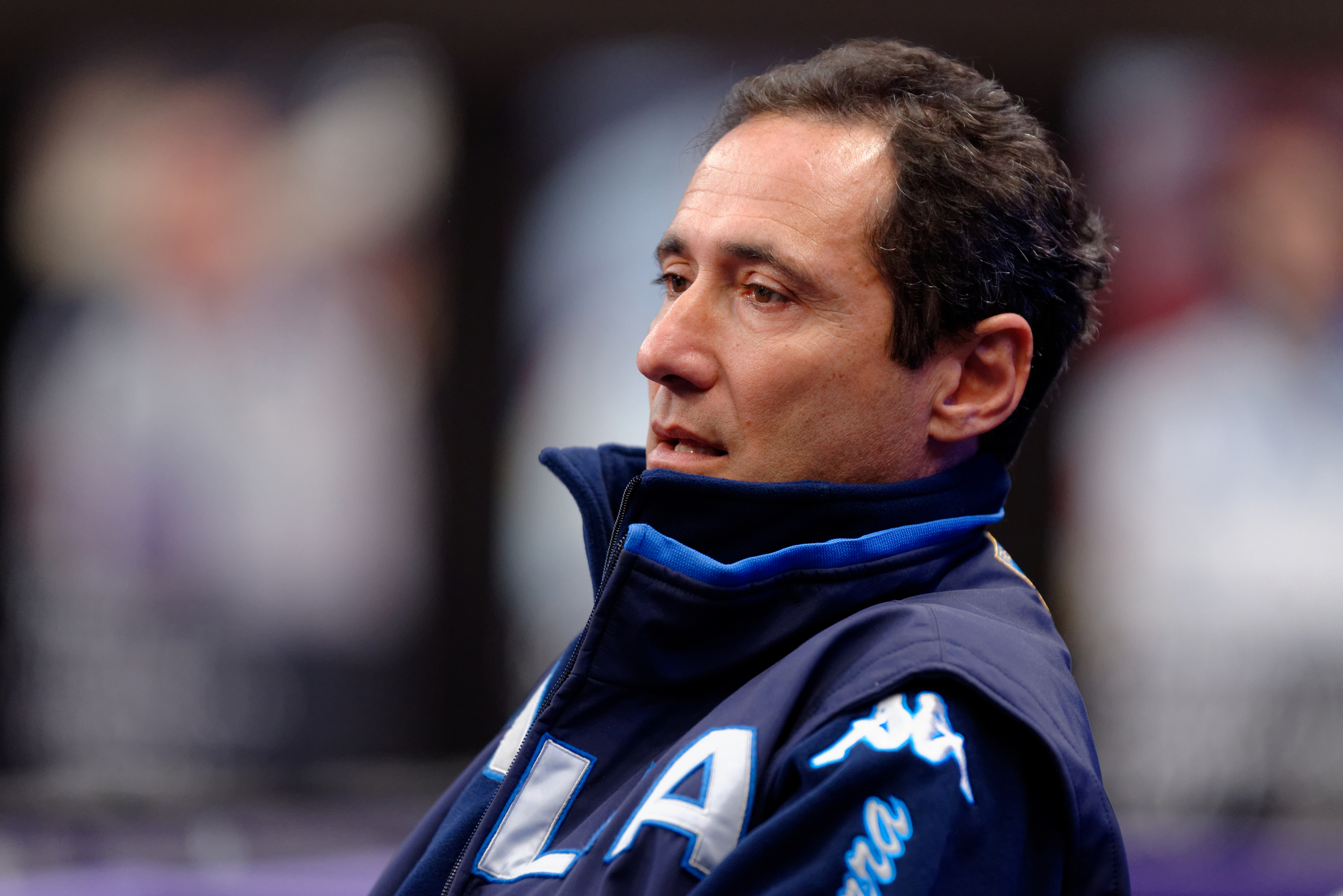

Personal information
- Born: 21 October 1962 (age 63) Naples, Italy
- Height: 1.85 m (6 ft 1 in)
- Weight: 80 kg (176 lb)

Fencing career
- Sport: Fencing
- Weapon: épée
- Hand: left-handed
- Club: CN Posillipo, Naples
- Head coach: Armando Coiro
Medal record
Men's épée
Representing Italy
Olympic Games
Gold medal – first place	1996 Atlanta	Team
Bronze medal – third place	1984 Los Angeles	Team
World Championships
Gold medal – first place	1989 Denver	Team
Gold medal – first place	1990 Lyon	Team
Gold medal – first place	1993 Essen	Team
Silver medal – second place	1985 Barcelona	Team
Silver medal – second place	1989 Denver	Individual
Bronze medal – third place	1983 Vienna	Team
Bronze medal – third place	1986 Sofia	Team
Bronze medal – third place	1995 The Hague	Individual
Bronze medal – third place	1997 Cape Town	Team
Mediterranean Games
Gold medal – first place	1983 Casablanca	Individual
Bronze medal – third place	1993 Languedoc-Roussillon	Individual

Sandro Cuomo (born 21 October 1962) is an Italian former épée fencer. He won a team gold medal at the 1996 Summer Olympics and a team bronze at the 1984 Summer Olympics. He competed in the individual épée event at the Mediterranean Games in 1983 where he won a gold medal and in the 1993 where he won a bronze medal. He is also three-time team world champion. He is director of épée at the Italian Fencing Federation.
