= Hannes Lembacher =

Austrian fencer

Personal information
- Born: 21 February 1954 (age 72) Vienna, Austria

Sport
- Sport: Fencing

Hannes Lembacher (born 21 February 1954) is an Austrian fencer. He competed in the individual épée event at the 1984 Summer Olympics.
