= Lam Tak Chuen =

Hong Kong fencer

Personal information
- Born: 21 March 1955 (age 71)

Sport
- Sport: Fencing

Lam Tak Chuen (born 21 March 1955) is a Hong Kong fencer. He competed in the individual and team foil and épée events at the 1984 Summer Olympics.
