= Khaled Soliman =

Egyptian fencer

Personal information
- Born: 2 December 1954 (age 71) Alexandria, Egypt

Sport
- Sport: Fencing

Khaled Soliman (born 2 December 1954) is an Egyptian former fencer. He competed in the foil and épée events at the 1984 Summer Olympics.
