= Ernesto Alais =

Argentine general (1929–2016)

Personal information
- Born: 26 October 1929; Lomas de Zamora, Buenos Aires, Argentina
- Died: 3 February 2016 (aged 86); Ezeiza, Buenos Aires, Argentina

Sport
- Sport: Sports shooting

Ernesto Arturo Alais (October 26, 1929 – February 3, 2016) was an Argentine brigadier general who gained notoriety during the 1987 Carapintada uprising.

== Biography ==
Alais was head of the 19th Infantry Regiment based in San Miguel de Tucumán. This unit was in charge of the repression in the province of Tucumán.

In 1982, Colonel Alais was the 2nd Commander and Chief of Staff of the IX Infantry Brigade. During Operation Rosario, he was in charge of this great combat unit since its commander, Brigadier General Américo Daher, was in the recovery of the Malvinas Islands.

Alais participated as an athlete in the 1984 Los Angeles Olympic Games in the sports shooting discipline.

In 1987 Alais received the order to suppress the uprising of Lieutenant Colonel Aldo Rico, located in Campo de Mayo. He left from the city of Rosario with a column of war tanks that advanced very slowly. President Alfonsín changed his initial attitude of not negotiating with the rebels and reached an agreement with them before Alais was even close to Campo de Mayo, so the idea of a refusal to repress on the part of Alais quickly settled. especially in the media that humorously exploited the situation.

Ernesto Alais was imprisoned in the Marcos Paz prison in 2012. Due to his poor health, he was sent to the Central Military Hospital and was later referred to the Ezeiza prison by order of the Federal Court of Tucumán, despite suffering from senile dementia.

He died on February 3, 2016, suffering from senile dementia.
