= Zhao Zhizhong (fencer) =

Chinese fencer

Personal information
- Born: 5 December 1958 (age 67)

Sport
- Sport: Fencing

Zhao Zhizhong (born 5 December 1958) is a Chinese fencer. He competed in the individual and team épée events at the 1984 Summer Olympics.
