= Jonathan Stanbury =

British fencer

Personal information
- Born: 8 March 1951 (age 75) Sliema, Malta

Sport
- Sport: Fencing

Jonathan Stanbury (born 8 March 1951) is a British fencer. He competed in the individual and team épée events at the 1984 Summer Olympics.
