= Greger Forslöw =

Swedish fencer

Personal information
- Born: 27 May 1961 (age 65) Stockholm, Sweden

Sport
- Sport: Fencing
- Club: FFF Stockholm

Thomas Greger Forslöw (born 27 May 1961) is a Swedish fencer. He competed in the individual and team épée events at the 1984 Summer Olympics.
