= Mohamed Al-Thuwani =

Kuwaiti fencer

Personal information
- Born: 22 February 1963 (age 63)

Sport
- Sport: Fencing

Mohamed Al-Thuwani (born 22 February 1963) is a Kuwaiti former fencer. He competed in the individual and team épée events at the 1980 and 1984 Summer Olympics.
