= Ihab Aly =

Egyptian fencer

Personal information
- Born: 23 July 1962 (age 63)

Sport
- Sport: Fencing

Ihab Aly (born 23 July 1962) is an Egyptian fencer. He competed in the individual and team épée events at the 1984 Summer Olympics.
