= David Cocker =

New Zealand fencer (born 1955)

David J. Cocker
Personal information
- Nationality: New Zealand
- Born: 27 April 1955 (age 71) Auckland, New Zealand

Sport
- Sport: Fencing
- Team: New Zealand

David J. Cocker (born 27 April 1955) is a New Zealand former fencer. He competed in the individual épée event at the 1984 Summer Olympics.
