= Liu Chi On =

Hong Kong fencer

Personal information
- Born: 26 January 1959 (age 67)
- Height: 1.80 m (5 ft 11 in)
- Weight: 68 kg (150 lb)

Fencing career
- Sport: Fencing
- Country: Hong Kong
- Weapon: foil, épée

Liu Chi On (born 26 January 1959) is a Hong Kong fencer. He competed in the team foil and the individual and team épée events at the 1984 Summer Olympics.
