= Stefano Bellone =

Italian fencer (born 1955)

Personal information
- Born: 23 April 1955 (age 71) Milan, Italy

Sport
- Sport: Fencing
Medal record
Men's fencing
Representing Italy
Olympic Games
Bronze medal – third place	1984 Los Angeles	Team épée
World Championships
Silver medal – second place	1985 Barcelona	Team épée
Bronze medal – third place	1983 Vienna	Team épée
Bronze medal – third place	1986 Sofia	Team épée
Summer Universiade
Gold medal – first place	1983 Edmonton	Individual épée
Gold medal – first place	1983 Edmonton	Team épée
Silver medal – second place	1979 Mexico City	Team foil
Bronze medal – third place	1977 Sofia	Team foil

Stefano Bellone (born 23 April 1955) is an Italian fencer. He won a bronze medal in the team épée event at the 1984 Summer Olympics.
