= Lee Shelley =

American fencer

Personal information
- Full name: Charles Lee Shelley
- Born: May 17, 1956 (age 70) Beaumont, Texas, United States
- Height: 6 ft 0 in (1.83 m)
- Weight: 174 lb (79 kg)

Sport
- Sport: Fencing
- College team: Princeton University

Charles Lee Shelley (born May 17, 1956) is an American fencer. He competed in the épée events at the 1984 and 1988 Summer Olympics.

== See also ==
- List of Princeton University Olympians
- List of USFA Division I National Champions
- List of USFA Hall of Fame members
