= Abdel Monem Salem =

Egyptian fencer

Personal information
- Born: 5 January 1955 (age 71)

Sport
- Sport: Fencing

Abdel Monem Salem (born 5 January 1955) is an Egyptian former fencer. He competed in the individual and team épée events at the 1984 Summer Olympics.
