= Nassar Al-Dosari =

Saudi Arabian fencer

Personal information
- Born: 1965 (age 60–61)

Sport
- Sport: Fencing

Nassar Al-Dosari (Arabic: نصار الدوسري; born 1965) is a Saudi Arabian fencer. He competed in the team épée event at the 1984 Summer Olympics in Los Angeles.
