= Paal Frisvold =

Norwegian fencer

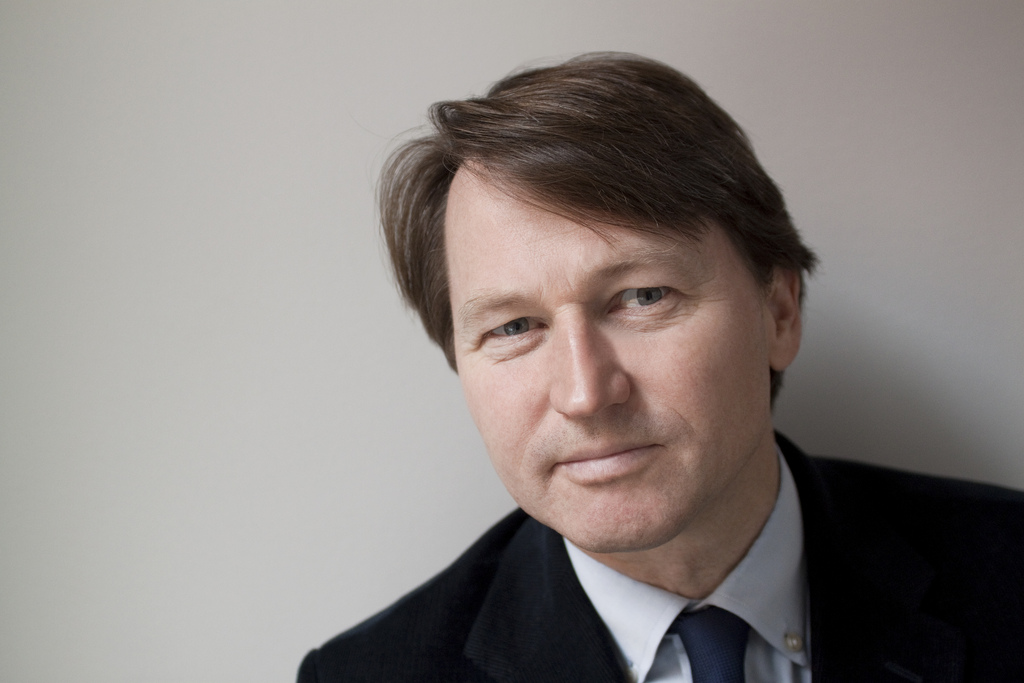

Personal information
- Born: 5 May 1962 (age 64) Oslo, Norway

Sport
- Sport: Fencing

Paal Frisvold (born 5 May 1962) is a Norwegian organizational leader and retired fencer.

He competed in the team épée event at the 1984 Summer Olympics. In 2009 he was elected as the new leader of the European Movement in Norway, succeeding Svein Roald Hansen.
