= Volker Fischer =

German fencer (born 1950)

Personal information
- Born: 15 August 1950 (age 75) Iserlohn, West Germany

Sport
- Sport: Fencing
Medal record
Men's fencing
Representing West Germany
Olympic Games
Gold medal – first place	1984 Los Angeles	Épée Team
Silver medal – second place	1976 Montréal	Épée Team
Silver medal – second place	1988 Seoul	Épée Team

Volker Fischer (born 15 August 1950) is a German fencer. He won a gold medal and two silvers at three Olympic Games.

He keeps fencing in the Veterans category, with excellent results. For example, he won the World Veterans Championship at Debrecen in 2014.
