= Daniel Perreault =

Canadian fencer (born 1961)

Personal information
- Born: 11 April 1961 (age 64); Dolbeau-Mistassini, Quebec, Canada

Sport
- Sport: Fencing

Daniel Perreault (born 11 April 1961) is a Canadian fencer. He competed in the individual and team épée events at the 1984 Summer Olympics.
