= Zong Xiangqing =

Chinese fencer

Personal information
- Born: 4 October 1960 (age 65)

Sport
- Sport: Fencing

Zong Xiangqing (Chinese: 宗祥慶, born 4 October 1960) is a Chinese fencer. He competed in the individual and team épée events at the 1984 Summer Olympics.
