= Robert Marx (fencer) =

American fencer

Personal information
- Born: September 25, 1956 (age 69) Portland, Oregon, United States

Sport
- Sport: Fencing
Medal record
Representing United States
Pan American Games
Silver medal – second place	1987 Indianapolis	Team épée
Bronze medal – third place	1991 Havana	Team épée

Robert Gabriel Marx (born September 25, 1956) is an American épée fencer. He competed at the 1984, 1988 and 1992 Summer Olympics. His brother Mike Marx is also an Olympic fencer.

== See also ==
- List of USFA Division I National Champions
- List of USFA Hall of Fame members
