= Bård Vonen =

Norwegian fencer

Personal information
- Born: 15 November 1955 (age 70) Bergen, Norway

Sport
- Sport: Fencing

Bård Vonen (born 15 November 1955) is a Norwegian épée fencer. He competed at the 1976 and 1984 Summer Olympics.
