= Gabriel Nigon =

Swiss fencer

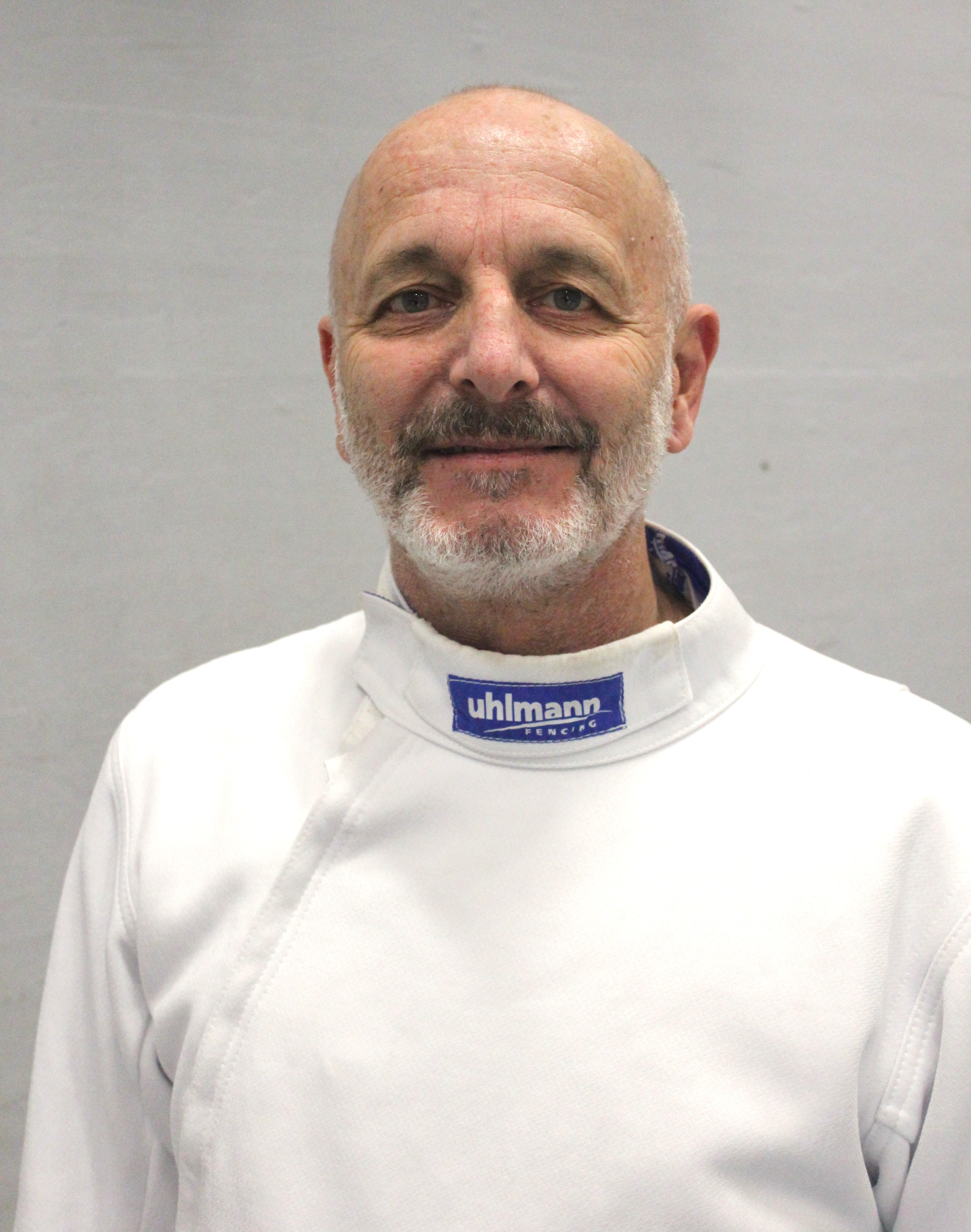

Personal information
- Born: 5 April 1956 (age 70)
- Height: 5–11.5 ft (1.5–3.5 m)
- Weight: 170 lb (77 kg)

Sport
- Sport: Fencing

Gabriel Nigon (born 5 April 1956) is a Swiss fencer. He competed in the individual and team épée events at the 1984 Summer Olympics.
