= Michel Dessureault =

Canadian fencer (born 1957)

Personal information
- Born: 11 March 1957 (age 69) Bouchette, Quebec, Canada

Sport
- Sport: Fencing

Achievements and titles
- Highest world ranking: 10th Place in the Los Angeles 1984 Games

Michel Dessureault (born 11 March 1957) is a Canadian fencer.

== Career ==
Dessureault competed at the 1976, 1984 and 1988 Summer Olympics.

== Accolades ==
Dessureault was inducted into the Ottawa Sport Hall of Fame.
