= Jamil Mohamed Bubashit =

Saudi Arabian fencer

Personal information
- Born: 1966 (age 59–60)

Sport
- Sport: Fencing

Jamil Mohamed Bubashit (Arabic: جميل محمد; born 1966) is a Saudi Arabian fencer. He competed in the individual and team épée events at the 1984 Summer Olympics.
