= Marcelo Magnasco =

Argentine fencer

Personal information
- Born: 23 June 1958 (age 68)

Sport
- Sport: Fencing

Marcelo Magnasco (born 23 June 1958) is an Argentine fencer. He competed in the foil and épée events at the 1984 Summer Olympics.
