= Kim Seong-mun =

South Korean fencer

Personal information
- Born: 15 October 1962 (age 63)

Sport
- Sport: Fencing

Korean name
- Hangul: 김성문
- Hanja: 金聖文
- RR: Gim Seongmun
- MR: Kim Sŏngmun

Kim Seong-mun (born 15 October 1962) is a South Korean fencer. He competed in the individual and team épée events at the 1984 Summer Olympics.
