= Csaba Gaspar =

Argentine fencer (born 1955)

Personal information
- Born: 27 July 1955 (age 70)

Sport
- Sport: Fencing

Csaba Gaspar (born 27 July 1955) is an Argentine fencer. He competed in the foil and épée events at the 1984 Summer Olympics.
