= Sergio Luchetti =

Argentine fencer

Personal information
- Born: 13 April 1958 (age 68)

Sport
- Sport: Fencing

Sergio Luchetti (born 13 April 1958) is an Argentine fencer. He competed in the individual and team foil and épée events at the 1984 Summer Olympics.
