= Kazem Hasan =

Kuwaiti fencer

Personal information
- Born: 9 February 1961 (age 65)

Sport
- Sport: Fencing

Kazem Hasan (born 9 February 1961) is a Kuwaiti former fencer. He competed in the individual and team épée events at the 1980 and 1984 Summer Olympics, and had a record of 4-40.
