= Nils Koppang =

Norwegian fencer

Personal information
- Born: 21 April 1958 (age 68) Oslo, Norway

Sport
- Sport: Fencing

Nils Koppang (born 21 April 1958) is a Norwegian fencer. He competed in the individual and team épée events at the 1976 and 1984 Summer Olympics. He is the father of Swedish handball player Nina Koppang.
