= Lee Il-hee =

South Korean fencer

Personal information
- Born: 30 October 1961 (age 64)

Sport
- Sport: Fencing

- Lee Il-hee
- Hangul: 이일희
- Hanja: 李日熙
- RR: I Ilhui
- MR: I Irhŭi

Lee Il-hee (Korean: 이일희; born 30 October 1961) is a South Korean fencer. He competed in the individual and team épée events at the 1984 and 1988 Summer Olympics.
