= Cui Yining =

Chinese fencer (born 1956)

Personal information
- Full name: Chinese: 崔 一寧; pinyin: Cuī Yī-níng
- Born: 5 May 1956 (age 70)

Sport
- Sport: Fencing

Cui Yining (born 5 May 1956) is a Chinese fencer. He competed in the épée and foil events at the 1984 Summer Olympics.
