= Yoon Nam-jin =

South Korean fencer

Personal information
- Nationality: South Korean
- Born: 5 August 1962 (age 63)
- Height: 185 cm (6 ft 1 in)
- Weight: 72 kg (159 lb)
- Website: yfckorea.co.kr

Sport
- Sport: Fencing

Korean name
- Hangul: 윤남진
- Hanja: 尹南珍
- RR: Yun Namjin
- MR: Yun Namjin

Yoon Nam-jin (Korean: 윤남진, born 5 August 1962) is a South Korean fencer. He competed in the individual and team épée events at the 1984 and 1988 Summer Olympics. He placed 28th and 33rd individually and seventh with the South Korean team.
