= Rashid Fahd Al-Rasheed =

Saudi Arabian fencer

Personal information
- Born: 1965 (age 60–61)

Sport
- Sport: Fencing

Rashid Fahd Al-Rasheed (Arabic: راشد فهد الرشيد; born 1965) is a Saudi Arabian fencer. He competed in the individual and team épée events at the 1984 Summer Olympics.
