= John Hugo Pedersen =

Norwegian fencer

Personal information
- Born: 13 July 1961 (age 64) Moss, Norway

Sport
- Sport: Fencing

John Hugo Pedersen (born 13 July 1961) is a Norwegian former fencer. He competed in the individual and team épée events at the 1984 Summer Olympics.
