= Fencing at the 1984 Summer Olympics – Women's foil =

Fencing event at 1984 Olympics

Women's foil at the Games of the XXIII Olympiad
- Venue: Long Beach Convention Center
- Dates: 2 – 3 August 1984
- Competitors: 42 from 18 nations

Medalists
1st place, gold medalist(s)		Jujie Luan	China
2nd place, silver medalist(s)		Cornelia Hanisch	West Germany
3rd place, bronze medalist(s)		Dorina Vaccaroni	Italy

The women's foil was one of eight fencing events on the fencing at the 1984 Summer Olympics programme. It was the twelfth appearance of the event. The competition was held from 2 to 3 August 1984. 42 fencers from 18 nations competed.

== Competition format ==
The 1984 tournament used a three-phase format similar to that of 1976 and 1980, though the final phase was different.

The first phase was a multi-round round-robin pool play format; each fencer in a pool faced each other fencer in that pool once. There were three pool rounds:

- The first round had 6 pools of 7 fencers each, with the top 5 in each pool advancing.
- The second round had 6 pools of 5 fencers each, with the top 4 in each pool advancing.
- The third round had 4 pools of 6 fencers each, with the top 4 in each pool advancing.

The second phase was a truncated double-elimination tournament. Four fencers advanced to the final round through the winners brackets and four more advanced via the repechage.

The final phase was a single elimination tournament with a bronze medal match. (This was changed from a 6-woman final round-robin pool in previous years.)

Bouts in the round-robin pools were to 5 touches; bouts in the double-elimination and final rounds were to 8 touches.

== Results ==
=== Round 1 ===
==== Round 1 Pool A ====
Pos	Fencer	W	L	TF	TA	Qual.	SB	DV	MP	DW	KP	LL	AS
1	Sabine Bischoff (FRG)	6	0	30	10	Q		5–2	5–0	5–2	5–4	5–1	5–1
2	Dorina Vaccaroni (ITA)	4	2	26	19	Q	2–5		4–5	5–3	5–2	5–2	5–2
3	Madeleine Philion (CAN)	4	2	23	21	Q	0–5	5–4		5–2	3–5	5–3	5–2
4	Debra Waples (USA)	3	3	22	21	Q	2–5	3–5	2–5		5–3	5–1	5–2
5	Kerstin Palm (SWE)	2	4	19	23	Q	4–5	2–5	5–3	3–5		0–5	5–0
6	Lourdes Lozano (MEX)	2	4	17	22		1–5	2–5	3–5	1–5	5–0		5–2
7	Alayna Snell (ISV)	0	6	9	30		1–5	2–5	2–5	2–5	0–5	2–5	

Source: Official Report, vol. 2, p. 390

==== Round 1 Pool B ====
Pos	Fencer	W	L	TF	TA	Qual.	JL	AD	LAM	JA	OSS	AC	SG
1	Jujie Luan (CHN)	6	0	30	12	Q		5–3	5–2	5–3	5–1	5–2	5–1
2	Aurora Dan (ROU)	4	2	25	14	Q	3–5		5–0	2–5	5–2	5–2	5–0
3	Linda Ann Martin (GBR)	4	2	22	20	Q	2–5	0–5		5–4	5–2	5–2	5–2
4	Jana Angelakis (USA)	3	3	24	23	Q	3–5	5–2	4–5		2–5	5–2	5–4
5	O Seung-Sun (KOR)	2	4	19	23	Q	1–5	2–5	2–5	5–2		4–5	5–1
6	Andrea Chaplin (AUS)	2	4	18	24		2–5	2–5	2–5	2–5	5–4		5–0
7	Sandra Giancola (ARG)	0	6	8	30		1–5	0–5	2–5	4–5	1–5	0–5	

Source: Official Report, vol. 2, p. 390

==== Round 1 Pool C ====
A barrage was necessary because Bradford and Sinigaglia finished with identical win–loss records, touches against, and touches for. Sinigaglia had won the round-robin bout between the two, but Bradford prevailed 5–0 in the barrage to advance to the second round.

Pos	Fencer	W	L	TF	TA	Qual.	BLG	CW	EGT	ND	MAS	VB	MM
1	Brigitte Latrille-Gaudin (FRA)	5	1	27	15	Q		5–3	5–4	5–2	5–1	2–5	5–0
2	Christiane Weber (FRG)	5	1	28	16	Q	3–5		5–3	5–3	5–4	5–0	5–1
3	Elisabeta Guzganu-Tufan (ROU)	4	2	27	14	Q	4–5	3–5		5–3	5–0	5–0	5–1
4	Nili Drori (ISR)	3	3	23	22	Q	2–5	3–5	3–5		5–2	5–4	5–1
5	María Alicia Sinigaglia (ARG)	2	4	17	26	B	1–5	4–5	0–5	2–5		5–3	5–3
5	Vincent Bradford (USA)	2	4	17	26	B	5–2	0–5	0–5	4–5	3–5		5–4
7	Miyuki Maekawa (JPN)	0	6	10	30		0–5	1–5	1–5	1–5	3–5	4–5	

Source: Official Report, vol. 2, p. 390

Barrage

Pos	Fencer	W	L	TF	TA	Qual.	VB	MAS
5	Vincent Bradford (USA)	1	0	5	0	Q		5–0
6	María Alicia Sinigaglia (ARG)	0	1	0	5		0–5	

Source: Official Report, vol. 2, p. 390

==== Round 1 Pool D ====
Pos	Fencer	W	L	TF	TA	Qual.	CH	MMZ	JP	ZQ	HS	GF	CBR
1	Cornelia Hanisch (FRG)	6	0	30	18	Q		5–4	5–3	5–1	5–4	5–2	5–4
2	Marcela Moldovan-Zsak (ROU)	4	2	28	20	Q	4–5		5–2	5–4	5–3	4–5	5–1
3	Jacynthe Poirier (CAN)	3	3	24	18	Q	3–5	2–5		4–5	5–3	5–0	5–0
4	Zhu Qingyuan (CHN)	3	3	24	22	Q	1–5	4–5	5–4		4–5	5–0	5–3
5	Helen Smith (AUS)	3	3	25	23	Q	4–5	3–5	3–5	5–4		5–0	5–4
6	Gina Faustin (HAI)	2	4	12	27		2–5	5–4	0–5	0–5	0–5		5–3
7	Choi Bok-Ran (KOR)	0	6	15	30		4–5	1–5	0–5	3–5	4–5	3–5	

Source: Official Report, vol. 2, p. 390

==== Round 1 Pool E ====
Pos	Fencer	W	L	TF	TA	Qual.	LMC	LT	CC	LH	AO	CM	BH
1	Laurence Modaine-Cessac (FRA)	6	0	30	14	Q		5–1	5–4	5–3	5–3	5–2	5–1
2	Liz Thurley (GBR)	5	1	26	17	Q	1–5		5–4	5–3	5–3	5–1	5–1
3	Carola Cicconetti (ITA)	4	2	28	17	Q	4–5	4–5		5–3	5–1	5–2	5–1
4	Li Huahua (CHN)	3	3	24	19	Q	3–5	3–5	3–5		5–0	5–4	5–0
5	Azusa Oikawa (JPN)	2	4	17	21	Q	3–5	3–5	1–5	0–5		5–1	5–0
6	Caroline Mitchell (CAN)	1	5	15	28		2–5	1–5	2–5	4–5	1–5		5–3
7	Barbra Higgins (PAN)	0	6	6	30		1–5	1–5	1–5	0–5	0–5	3–5	

Source: Official Report, vol. 2, p. 390

==== Round 1 Pool F ====
Pos	Fencer	W	L	TF	TA	Qual.	LCH	VB	FM	MZ	MM	SG	SV
1	Lydia Czuckermann-Hatuel (ISR)	6	0	30	17	Q		5–4	5–1	5–4	5–3	5–4	5–1
2	Véronique Brouquier (FRA)	4	2	27	16	Q	4–5		5–2	3–5	5–1	5–1	5–2
3	Fiona McIntosh (GBR)	4	2	23	16	Q	1–5	2–5		5–1	5–3	5–1	5–1
4	Margherita Zalaffi (ITA)	4	2	25	19	Q	4–5	5–3	1–5		5–4	5–2	5–0
5	Mieko Miyahara (JPN)	2	4	21	28	Q	3–5	1–5	3–5	4–5		5–4	5–4
6	Silvana Giancola (ARG)	1	5	17	27		4–5	1–5	1–5	2–5	4–5		5–2
7	Sheila Viard (HAI)	0	6	10	30		1–5	2–5	1–5	0–5	4–5	2–5	

Source: Official Report, vol. 2, p. 390

=== Round 2 ===
==== Round 2 Pool A ====
Pos	Fencer	W	L	TF	TA	Qual.	SB	ND	MMZ	CC	JA
1	Sabine Bischoff (FRG)	3	1	18	12	Q		3–5	5–4	5–0	5–3
2	Nili Drori (ISR)	3	1	17	16	Q	5–3		5–4	2–5	5–4
3	Marcela Moldovan-Zsak (ROU)	2	2	18	15	Q	4–5	4–5		5–1	5–4
4	Carola Cicconetti (ITA)	2	2	11	13	Q	0–5	5–2	1–5		5–1
5	Jana Angelakis (USA)	0	4	12	20		3–5	4–5	4–5	1–5	

Source: Official Report, vol. 2, p. 390

==== Round 2 Pool B ====
Pos	Fencer	W	L	TF	TA	Qual.	JL	VB	FM	DW	AO
1	Jujie Luan (CHN)	4	0	20	5	Q		5–3	5–1	5–1	5–0
2	Véronique Brouquier (FRA)	3	1	18	11	Q	3–5		5–2	5–3	5–1
3	Fiona McIntosh (GBR)	1	3	12	17	Q	1–5	2–5		5–2	4–5
4	Debra Waples (USA)	1	3	11	17	Q	1–5	3–5	2–5		5–2
5	Azusa Oikawa (JPN)	1	3	8	19		0–5	1–5	5–4	2–5	

Source: Official Report, vol. 2, p. 390

==== Round 2 Pool C ====
Pos	Fencer	W	L	TF	TA	Qual.	DV	LMC	AD	KP	HS
1	Dorina Vaccaroni (ITA)	4	0	20	7	Q		5–0	5–4	5–2	5–1
2	Laurence Modaine-Cessac (FRA)	3	1	15	12	Q	0–5		5–4	5–1	5–2
3	Aurora Dan (ROU)	2	2	18	14	Q	4–5	4–5		5–3	5–1
4	Kerstin Palm (SWE)	1	3	11	18	Q	2–5	1–5	3–5		5–3
5	Helen Smith (AUS)	0	4	7	20		1–5	2–5	1–5	3–5	

Source: Official Report, vol. 2, p. 390

==== Round 2 Pool D ====
Pos	Fencer	W	L	TF	TA	Qual.	EGT	MZ	OSS	ZQ	LCH
1	Elisabeta Guzganu-Tufan (FRA)	4	0	20	7	Q		5–2	5–2	5–0	5–3
2	Margherita Zalaffi (ITA)	2	2	16	14	Q	2–5		4–5	5–3	5–1
3	O Seung-Sun (KOR)	2	2	16	18	Q	2–5	5–4		5–4	4–5
4	Zhu Qingyuan (CHN)	1	3	12	16	Q	0–5	3–5	4–5		5–1
5	Lydia Czuckermann-Hatuel (ISR)	1	3	10	19		3–5	1–5	5–4	1–5	

Source: Official Report, vol. 2, p. 390

==== Round 2 Pool E ====
Pos	Fencer	W	L	TF	TA	Qual.	CH	LH	LT	MP	MM
1	Cornelia Hanisch (FRG)	4	0	20	9	Q		5–4	5–3	5–1	5–1
2	Li Huahua (CHN)	3	1	19	12	Q	4–5		5–1	5–3	5–3
3	Liz Thurley (GBR)	2	2	14	10	Q	3–5	1–5		5–0	5–0
4	Madeleine Philion (CAN)	1	3	9	17	Q	1–5	3–5	0–5		5–2
5	Mieko Miyahara (JPN)	0	4	6	20		1–5	3–5	0–5	2–5	

Source: Official Report, vol. 2, p. 390

==== Round 2 Pool F ====
Pos	Fencer	W	L	TF	TA	Qual.	CW	BLG	LAM	VB	JP
1	Christiane Weber (FRG)	3	1	19	12	Q		5–3	5–2	5–2	4–5
2	Brigitte Latrille-Gaudin (FRA)	3	1	18	14	Q	3–5		5–2	5–3	5–4
3	Linda Ann Martin (GBR)	2	2	14	14	Q	2–5	2–5		5–1	5–3
4	Vincent Bradford (USA)	1	3	11	16	Q	2–5	3–5	1–5		5–1
5	Jacynthe Poirier (CAN)	1	3	13	19		5–4	4–5	3–5	1–5	

Source: Official Report, vol. 2, p. 391

=== Round 3 ===
==== Round 3 Pool A ====
Pos	Fencer	W	L	TF	TA	Qual.	CC	JL	SB	BLG	OSS	MP
1	Carola Cicconetti (ITA)	4	1	23	10	Q		5–2	5–1	3–5	5–1	5–1
2	Jujie Luan (CHN)	4	1	22	12	Q	2–5		5–1	5–1	5–4	5–1
3	Sabine Bischoff (FRG)	3	2	17	12	Q	1–5	1–5		5–0	5–1	5–1
4	Brigitte Latrille-Gaudin (FRA)	3	2	16	15	Q	5–3	1–5	0–5		5–0	5–2
5	O Seung-Sun (KOR)	1	4	11	23		1–5	4–5	1–5	0–5		5–3
6	Madeleine Philion (CAN)	0	5	8	25		1–5	1–5	1–5	2–5	3–5	

Source: Official Report, vol. 2, p. 391

==== Round 3 Pool B ====
Pos	Fencer	W	L	TF	TA	Qual.	EGT	MZ	LMC	ZQ	CW	FM
1	Elisabeta Guzganu-Tufan (ROU)	4	1	24	16	Q		5–2	4–5	5–3	5–2	5–4
2	Margherita Zalaffi (ITA)	4	1	22	15	Q	2–5		5–4	5–2	5–3	5–1
3	Laurence Modaine-Cessac (FRA)	4	1	24	19	Q	5–4	4–5		5–3	5–3	5–4
4	Zhu Qingyuan (CHN)	2	3	18	16	Q	3–5	2–5	3–5		5–0	5–1
5	Christiane Weber (FRG)	1	4	13	23		2–5	3–5	3–5	0–5		5–3
6	Fiona McIntosh (GBR)	0	5	13	25		4–5	1–5	4–5	1–5	3–5	

Source: Official Report, vol. 2, p. 391

==== Round 3 Pool C ====
Pos	Fencer	W	L	TF	TA	Qual.	LH	AD	DV	LAM	ND	DW
1	Li Huahua (CHN)	4	1	23	13	Q		3–5	5–4	5–0	5–4	5–0
2	Aurora Dan (ROU)	4	1	20	16	Q	5–3		5–4	5–3	5–1	0–5
3	Dorina Vaccaroni (ITA)	3	2	23	17	Q	4–5	4–5		5–4	5–2	5–1
4	Linda Ann Martin (GBR)	2	3	17	21	Q	0–5	3–5	4–5		5–4	5–2
5	Nili Drori (ISR)	1	4	16	21		4–5	1–5	2–5	4–5		5–1
6	Debra Waples (USA)	1	4	9	20		0–5	5–0	1–5	2–5	1–5	

Source: Official Report, vol. 2, p. 391

==== Round 3 Pool D ====
Pos	Fencer	W	L	TF	TA	Qual.	CH	VBro	LT	KP	MMZ	VBra
1	Cornelia Hanisch (FRG)	4	1	24	15	Q		4–5	5–2	5–4	5–3	5–1
1	Véronique Brouquier (FRA)	4	1	24	15	Q	5–4		4–5	5–3	5–2	5–1
3	Liz Thurley (GBR)	4	1	22	18	Q	2–5	5–4		5–3	5–4	5–2
4	Kerstin Palm (SWE)	2	3	20	21	Q	4–5	3–5	3–5		5–3	5–3
5	Marcela Moldovan-Zsak (ROU)	1	4	17	24		3–5	2–5	4–5	3–5		5–4
6	Vincent Bradford (USA)	0	5	11	25		1–5	1–5	2–5	3–5	4–5	

Source: Official Report, vol. 2, p. 391

=== Double elimination rounds ===
==== Winners brackets ====
===== Winners group 1 =====
Round of 16		Round of 8
Jujie Luan (CHN)	7
Kerstin Palm (SWE)	8	Kerstin Palm (SWE)	5
Sabine Bischoff (FRG)	8	Sabine Bischoff (FRG)	8
Carola Cicconetti (ITA)	7

===== Winners group 2 =====
Round of 16		Round of 8
Li Huahua (CHN)	5
Aurora Dan (ROU)	8	Aurora Dan (ROU)	5
Brigitte Latrille-Gaudin (FRA)	3	Dorina Vaccaroni (ITA)	8
Dorina Vaccaroni (ITA)	8

===== Winners group 3 =====
Round of 16		Round of 8
Cornelia Hanisch (FRG)	8
Zhu Qingyuan (CHN)	4	Cornelia Hanisch (FRG)	W
Liz Thurley (GBR)	3	Véronique Brouquier (FRA)	L
Véronique Brouquier (FRA)	8

===== Winners group 4 =====
Round of 16		Round of 8
Laurence Modaine-Cessac (FRA)	8
Margherita Zalaffi (ITA)	7	Laurence Modaine-Cessac (FRA)	4
Linda Ann Martin (GBR)	3	Elisabeta Guzganu-Tufan (ROU)	8
Elisabeta Guzganu-Tufan (ROU)	8

==== Losers brackets ====
===== Losers group 1 =====
Round of 4		Round of 2
Jujie Luan (CHN)	8
Carola Cicconetti (ITA)	5	Jujie Luan (CHN)	8
		Aurora Dan (ROU)	7

===== Losers group 2 =====
Round of 4		Round of 2
Li Huahua (CHN)	6
Brigitte Latrille-Gaudin (FRA)	8	Brigitte Latrille-Gaudin (FRA)	8
		Kerstin Palm (SWE)	2

===== Losers group 3 =====
Round of 4		Round of 2
Zhu Qingyuan (CHN)	8
Liz Thurley (GBR)	3	Zhu Qingyuan (CHN)	7
		Véronique Brouquier (FRA)	8

===== Losers group 4 =====
Round of 4		Round of 2
Margherita Zalaffi (ITA)	7
Linda Ann Martin (GBR)	8	Linda Ann Martin (GBR)	3
		Laurence Modaine-Cessac (FRA)	8

=== Final round ===
Quarterfinals
Elisabeta Guzganu-Tufan (ROU)	8
Brigitte Latrille-Gaudin (FRA)	3
Jujie Luan (CHN)	8
Sabine Bischoff (FRG)	5
Dorina Vaccaroni (ITA)	9
Véronique Brouquier (FRA)	7
Laurence Modaine-Cessac (FRA)	7
Cornelia Hanisch (FRG)	9

Semifinals
Elisabeta Guzganu-Tufan (ROU)	0
Jujie Luan (CHN)	8
Dorina Vaccaroni (ITA)	6
Cornelia Hanisch (FRG)	8

Finals
Jujie Luan (CHN)	8
Cornelia Hanisch (FRG)	3
Third place
Elisabeta Guzganu-Tufan (ROU)	5
Dorina Vaccaroni (ITA)	8

== Final classification ==
Fencer	Country
Jujie Luan	China
Cornelia Hanisch	West Germany
Dorina Vaccaroni	Italy
Elisabeta Guzganu-Tufan	Romania
Véronique Brouquier	France
Laurence Modaine-Cessac	France
Sabine Bischoff	West Germany
Brigitte Latrille-Gaudin	France
Aurora Dan	Romania
Linda Ann Martin	Great Britain
Zhu Qingyuan	China
Kerstin Palm	Sweden
Li Huahua	China
Carola Cicconetti	Italy
Margherita Zalaffi	Italy
Liz Thurley	Great Britain
Nili Drori	Israel
Marcela Moldovan-Zsak	Romania
Christiane Weber	West Germany
Debra Waples	United States
O Seung-Sun	South Korea
Fiona McIntosh	Great Britain
Vincent Bradford	United States
Madeleine Philion	Canada
Jacynthe Poirier	Canada
Lydia Czuckermann-Hatuel	Israel
Azusa Oikawa	Japan
Jana Angelakis	United States
Helen Smith	Australia
Mieko Miyahara	Japan
Lourdes Lozano	Mexico
Andrea Chaplin	Australia
María Alicia Sinigaglia	Argentina
Gina Faustin	Haiti
Silvana Giancola	Argentina
Caroline Mitchell	Canada
Choi Bok-Ran	South Korea
Miyuki Maekawa	Japan
Sheila Viard	Haiti
Alayna Snell	Virgin Islands
Sandra Giancola	Argentina
Barbra Higgins	Panama
