= List of Olympic medalists in fencing (women) =

This is the complete list of women's Olympic medalists in fencing.

== Current Program ==
=== Foil, Individual ===
Games	Gold	Silver	Bronze
1924 Paris	Ellen Osiier; Denmark	Gladys Davis; Great Britain	Grete Heckscher; Denmark
1928 Amsterdam	Helene Mayer; Germany	Muriel Freeman; Great Britain	Olga Oelkers; Germany
1932 Los Angeles	Ellen Preis; Austria	Judy Guinness; Great Britain	Erna Bogen-Bogáti; Hungary
1936 Berlin	Ilona Elek; Hungary	Helene Mayer; Germany	Ellen Preis; Austria
1948 London	Ilona Elek; Hungary	Karen Lachmann; Denmark	Ellen Mueller; Austria
1952 Helsinki	Irene Camber; Italy	Ilona Elek; Hungary	Karen Lachmann; Denmark
1956 Melbourne	Gillian Sheen; Great Britain	Olga Orbán; Romania	Renée Garilhe; France
1960 Rome	Heidi Schmid; United Team of Germany	Valentina Rastvorova; Soviet Union	Maria Vicol; Romania
1964 Tokyo	Ildikó Újlaky-Rejtő; Hungary	Helga Mees; United Team of Germany	Antonella Ragno; Italy
1968 Mexico City	Elena Belova; Soviet Union	Pilar Roldán; Mexico	Ildikó Újlaky-Rejtő; Hungary
1972 Munich	Antonella Ragno-Lonzi; Italy	Ildikó Bóbis; Hungary	Galina Gorokhova; Soviet Union
1976 Montreal	Ildikó Schwarczenberger; Hungary	Maria Consolata Collino; Italy	Elena Belova; Soviet Union
1980 Moscow	Pascale Trinquet; France	Magda Maros; Hungary	Barbara Wysoczańska; Poland
1984 Los Angeles	Luan Jujie; China	Cornelia Hanisch; West Germany	Dorina Vaccaroni; Italy
1988 Seoul	Anja Fichtel; West Germany	Sabine Bau; West Germany	Zita-Eva Funkenhauser; West Germany
1992 Barcelona	Giovanna Trillini; Italy	Wang Huifeng; China	Tatyana Sadovskaya; Unified Team
1996 Atlanta	Laura Badea; Romania	Valentina Vezzali; Italy	Giovanna Trillini; Italy
2000 Sydney	Valentina Vezzali; Italy	Rita Koenig; Germany	Giovanna Trillini; Italy
2004 Athens	Valentina Vezzali; Italy	Giovanna Trillini; Italy	Sylwia Gruchała; Poland
2008 Beijing	Valentina Vezzali; Italy	Nam Hyun-hee; South Korea	Margherita Granbassi; Italy
2012 London	Elisa Di Francisca; Italy	Arianna Errigo; Italy	Valentina Vezzali; Italy
2016 Rio de Janeiro	Inna Deriglazova; Russia	Elisa Di Francisca; Italy	Inès Boubakri; Tunisia
2020 Tokyo	Lee Kiefer; United States	Inna Deriglazova; ROC	Larisa Korobeynikova; ROC
2024 Paris	Lee Kiefer; United States	Lauren Scruggs; United States	Eleanor Harvey; Canada
2028 Los Angeles			

=== Foil, Team ===
Games	Gold	Silver	Bronze
1960 Rome	Soviet Union; Valentina Prudskova; Alexandra Zabelina; Lyudmila Shishova; Tatyana Petrenko; Galina Gorokhova; Valentina Rastvorova	Hungary; Györgyi Marvalics; Ildikó Újlaky-Rejtő; Magdolna Nyári; Katalin Juhász; Lídia Dömölky	Italy; Bruna Colombetti; Velleda Cesari; Claudia Pasini; Irene Camber; Antonella Ragno-Lonzi
1964 Tokyo	Hungary; Paula Marosi; Katalin Juhász; Judit Ágoston; Lídia Dömölky; Ildikó Újlaky-Rejtő	Soviet Union; Lyudmila Shishova; Valentina Prudskova; Valentina Rastvorova; Tatyana Samusenko; Galina Gorokhova	United Team of Germany; Heidi Schmid; Helga Mees; Rosemarie Scherberger; Gudrun Theuerkauff
1968 Mexico City	Soviet Union; Alexandra Zabelina; Tatyana Samusenko; Elena Belova; Galina Gorokhova; Svetlana Tširkova	Hungary; Lídia Dömölky; Ildikó Bóbis; Ildikó Újlaky-Rejtő; Mária Gulácsy; Paula Marosi	Romania; Ecaterina Iencic-Stahl; Ileana Gyulai-Drimba-Jenei; Maria Vicol; Olga Orban-Szabo; Ana Dersidan-Ene-Pascu
1972 Munich	Soviet Union; Elena Belova; Galina Gorokhova; Tatyana Samusenko; Alexandra Zabelina; Svetlana Tširkova	Hungary; Ildikó Bóbis; Ildikó Újlaky-Rejtő; Ildikó Schwarczenberger; Mária Szolnoki; Ildikó Rónay	Romania; Ileana Gyulai-Drimba-Jenei; Ana Dersidan-Ene-Pascu; Ecaterina Iencic-Stahl; Olga Orban-Szabo
1976 Montreal	Soviet Union; Elena Belova; Olga Knyazeva; Valentina Sidorova; Nailya Gilyazova; Valentina Nikonova	France; Brigitte Latrille-Gaudin; Brigitte Gapais-Dumont; Christine Muzio; Véronique Trinquet; Claudette Herbster-Josland	Hungary; Ildikó Schwarczenberger; Edit Kovács; Magda Maros; Ildikó Újlaky-Rejtő; Ildikó Bóbis
1980 Moscow	France; Brigitte Latrille-Gaudin; Pascale Trinquet; Isabelle Bégard; Véronique Brouquier; Christine Muzio	Soviet Union; Valentina Sidorova; Nailya Gilyazova; Elena Belova; Irina Ushakova; Larisa Tsagaraeva	Hungary; Ildikó Schwarczenberger; Magda Maros; Gertrúd Stefanek; Zsuzsanna Szőcs; Edit Kovács
1984 Los Angeles	West Germany; Ute Kircheis-Wessel; Christiane Weber; Cornelia Hanisch; Sabine Bischoff; Zita-Eva Funkenhauser	Romania; Aurora Dan; Monika Weber-Koszto; Rozalia Oros; Marcela Moldovan-Zsak; Elisabeta Guzganu-Tufan	France; Laurence Modaine; Pascale Trinquet-Hachin; Brigitte Latrille-Gaudin; Véronique Brouquier; Anne Meygret
1988 Seoul	West Germany; Sabine Bau; Anja Fichtel; Zita-Eva Funkenhauser; Annette Klug; Christiane Weber	Italy; Francesca Bortolozzi-Borella; Annapia Gandolfi; Lucia Traversa; Dorina Vaccaroni; Margherita Zalaffi	Hungary; Zsuzsa Jánosi; Edit Kovács; Gertrúd Stefanek; Zsuzsanna Szőcs; Katalin Tuschák
1992 Barcelona	Italy; Diana Bianchedi; Francesca Bortolozzi-Borella; Giovanna Trillini; Dorina Vaccaroni; Margherita Zalaffi	Germany; Sabine Bau; Zita-Eva Funkenhauser; Annette Dobmeier; Anja Fichtel-Mauritz; Monika Weber-Koszto	Romania; Reka Szabo-Lazar; Claudia Grigorescu; Elisabeta Tufan; Laura Badea; Roxana Dumitrescu
1996 Atlanta	Italy; Francesca Bortolozzi-Borella; Giovanna Trillini; Valentina Vezzali	Romania; Laura Badea; Reka Szabo; Roxana Scarlat	Germany; Anja Fichtel-Mauritz; Sabine Bau; Monika Weber-Koszto
2000 Sydney	Italy; Diana Bianchedi; Giovanna Trillini; Valentina Vezzali	Poland; Sylwia Gruchała; Magdalena Mroczkiewicz; Anna Rybicka; Barbara Wolnicka-Szewczyk	Germany; Sabine Bau; Rita Koenig; Monika Weber
2004 Athens	not included in the Olympic program		
2008 Beijing	Russia; Svetlana Boyko; Aida Shanayeva; Viktoria Nikishina; Yevgeniya Lamonova	United States; Emily Cross; Hanna Thompson; Erinn Smart	Italy; Valentina Vezzali; Giovanna Trillini; Margherita Granbassi; Ilaria Salvatori
2012 London	Italy; Valentina Vezzali; Elisa Di Francisca; Arianna Errigo; Ilaria Salvatori	Russia; Aida Shanayeva; Larisa Korobeynikova; Inna Deriglazova; Kamila Gafurzyanova	South Korea; Nam Hyun-hee; Jeon Hee-sook; Jung Gil-ok; Oh Ha-na
2016 Rio de Janeiro	not included in the Olympic program		
2020 Tokyo	ROC (ROC); Inna Deriglazova; Larisa Korobeynikova; Marta Martyanova; Adelina Zagidullina	France; Ysaora Thibus; Pauline Ranvier; Anita Blaze; Astrid Guyart	Italy; Martina Batini; Erica Cipressa; Arianna Errigo; Alice Volpi
2024 Paris	United States; Jacqueline Dubrovich; Lee Kiefer; Lauren Scruggs; Maia Weintraub	Italy; Arianna Errigo; Martina Favaretto; Alice Volpi; Francesca Palumbo	Japan; Sera Azuma; Yuka Ueno; Karin Miyawaki; Komaki Kikuchi
2028 Los Angeles			

=== Épée, Individual ===
Games	Gold	Silver	Bronze
1996 Atlanta	Laura Flessel; France	Valérie Barlois; France	Gyöngyi Szalay; Hungary
2000 Sydney	Tímea Nagy; Hungary	Gianna Hablützel-Bürki; Switzerland	Laura Flessel-Colovic; France
2004 Athens	Tímea Nagy; Hungary	Laura Flessel-Colovic; France	Maureen Nisima; France
2008 Beijing	Britta Heidemann; Germany	Ana Maria Brânză; Romania	Ildikó Mincza-Nébald; Hungary
2012 London	Yana Shemyakina; Ukraine	Britta Heidemann; Germany	Sun Yujie; China
2016 Rio de Janeiro	Emese Szász; Hungary	Rossella Fiamingo; Italy	Sun Yiwen; China
2020 Tokyo	Sun Yiwen; China	Ana Maria Popescu; Romania	Katrina Lehis; Estonia
2024 Paris	Vivian Kong; Hong Kong	Auriane Mallo-Breton; France	Eszter Muhari; Hungary
2028 Los Angeles			

=== Épée, Team ===
Games	Gold	Silver	Bronze
1996 Atlanta	France; Laura Flessel; Sophie Moressée-Pichot; Valérie Barlois	Italy; Laura Chiesa; Elisa Uga; Margherita Zalaffi	Russia; Maria Mazina; Yuliya Garayeva; Karina Aznavourian
2000 Sydney	Russia; Karina Aznavourian; Oksana Yermakova; Tatiana Logunova; Maria Mazina	Switzerland; Gianna Hablützel-Bürki; Sophie Lamon; Diana Romagnoli	China; Li Na; Liang Qin; Yang Shaoqi
2004 Athens	Russia; Karina Aznavourian; Oksana Yermakova; Tatiana Logunova; Anna Sivkova	Germany; Claudia Bokel; Imke Duplitzer; Britta Heidemann	France; Sarah Daninthe; Laura Flessel-Colovic; Hajnalka Kiraly-Picot; Maureen Nisima
2008 Beijing	not included in the Olympic program		
2012 London	China; Sun Yujie; Xu Anqi; Li Na; Luo Xiaojuan	South Korea; Shin A-lam; Choi In-jeong; Jung Hyo-jung; Choi Eun-sook	United States; Courtney Hurley; Kelley Hurley; Maya Lawrence; Susie Scanlan
2016 Rio de Janeiro	Romania; Loredana Dinu; Simona Gherman; Simona Pop; Ana Maria Popescu	China; Hao Jialu; Sun Yiwen; Sun Yujie; Xu Anqi	Russia; Olga Kochneva; Violetta Kolobova; Tatiana Logunova; Lyubov Shutova
2020 Tokyo	Estonia; Katrina Lehis; Julia Beljajeva; Erika Kirpu; Irina Embrich	South Korea; Choi In-jeong; Song Se-ra; Kang Young-mi; Lee Hye-in	Italy; Rossella Fiamingo; Federica Isola; Mara Navarria; Alberta Santuccio
2024 Paris	Italy; Rossella Fiamingo; Mara Navarria; Giulia Rizzi; Alberta Santuccio	France; Marie-Florence Candassamy; Alexandra Louis-Marie; Auriane Mallo-Breton; Coraline Vitalis	Poland; Aleksandra Jarecka; Alicja Klasik; Renata Knapik-Miazga; Martyna Swatowska-Wenglarczyk
2028 Los Angeles			

=== Sabre, Individual ===
Games	Gold	Silver	Bronze
2004 Athens	Mariel Zagunis; United States	Tan Xue; China	Sada Jacobson; United States
2008 Beijing	Mariel Zagunis; United States	Sada Jacobson; United States	Rebecca Ward; United States
2012 London	Kim Ji-yeon; South Korea	Sofiya Velikaya; Russia	Olha Kharlan; Ukraine
2016 Rio de Janeiro	Yana Egorian; Russia	Sofiya Velikaya; Russia	Olha Kharlan; Ukraine
2020 Tokyo	Sofia Pozdniakova; ROC	Sofiya Velikaya; ROC	Manon Brunet; France
2024 Paris	Manon Apithy-Brunet; France	Sara Balzer; France	Olga Kharlan; Ukraine
2028 Los Angeles			

=== Sabre, Team ===
Games	Gold	Silver	Bronze
2008 Beijing	Ukraine; Olha Zhovnir; Olha Kharlan; Halyna Pundyk; Olena Khomrova	China; Bao Yingying; Huang Haiyang; Ni Hong; Tan Xue	United States; Sada Jacobson; Rebecca Ward; Mariel Zagunis
2012 London	not included in the Olympic program		
2016 Rio de Janeiro	Russia; Sofya Velikaya; Yana Egorian; Yekaterina Dyachenko; Yuliya Gavrilova	Ukraine; Olha Kharlan; Olena Kravatska; Alina Komashchuk; Olena Voronina	United States; Monica Aksamit; Ibtihaj Muhammad; Dagmara Wozniak; Mariel Zagunis
2020 Tokyo	ROC (ROC); Olga Nikitina; Sofia Pozdniakova; Sofya Velikaya	France; Sara Balzer; Cécilia Berder; Manon Brunet; Charlotte Lembach	South Korea; Kim Ji-yeon; Yoon Ji-su; Seo Ji-yeon; Choi Soo-yeon
2024 Paris	Ukraine; Olga Kharlan; Olena Kravatska; Alina Komashchuk; Yuliya Bakastova	South Korea; Choi Se-bin; Jeon Ha-young; Jeon Eun-hye; Yoon Ji-su	Japan; Risa Takashima; Seri Ozaki; Misaki Emura; Shihomi Fukushima
2028 Los Angeles			

== All-time medal table - Women's - 1924–2024 ==
Rank	Nation	Gold	Silver	Bronze	Total
1	Italy	12	9	10	31
2	Hungary	8	6	8	22
3	Russia	6	3	2	11
4	France	5	8	6	19
5	United States	5	3	5	13
6	Soviet Union	5	3	2	10
7	China	3	4	3	10
8	ROC (ROC)	3	2	1	6
8	West Germany	3	2	1	6
10	Ukraine	3	1	3	7
11	Romania	2	5	4	11
12	Germany	2	5	3	10
13	South Korea	1	4	2	7
14	Great Britain	1	3	0	4
15	Denmark	1	1	2	4
16	United Team of Germany	1	1	1	3
17	Austria	1	0	2	3
18	Estonia	1	0	1	2
19	Hong Kong	1	0	0	1
20	Switzerland	0	2	0	2
21	Poland	0	1	3	4
22	Mexico	0	1	0	1
23	Japan	0	0	2	2
24	Canada	0	0	1	1
24	Tunisia	0	0	1	1
24	Unified Team	0	0	1	1
Totals (26 entries)		64	64	64	192
