= Fencing at the 1984 Summer Olympics – Women's team foil =

Fencing at the Olympics

Women's team foil at the Games of the XXIII Olympiad
- Venue: Long Beach Convention Center
- Dates: 5 – 6 August 1984
- Competitors: 48 from 10 nations

Medalists
1st place, gold medalist(s)		Christiane Weber, Cornelia Hanisch, Sabine Bischoff, Ute Kircheis-Wessel, Zita-Eva Funkenhauser	West Germany
2nd place, silver medalist(s)		Aurora Dan, Monika Weber-Koszto, Rozalia Oros, Marcela Moldovan-Zsak, Elisabeta Guzganu-Tufan	Romania
3rd place, bronze medalist(s)		Laurence Modaine-Cessac, Pascale Trinquet-Hachin, Brigitte Latrille-Gaudin, Véronique Brouquier, Anne Meygret	France

The women's team foil was one of eight fencing events on the fencing at the 1984 Summer Olympics programme. It was the seventh appearance of the event. The competition was held from 5 to 6 August 1984. 48 fencers from 10 nations competed.

== Rosters ==
Argentina
- María Alicia Sinigaglia
- Sandra Giancola
- Constanza Oriani
- Silvana Giancola

Canada
- Caroline Mitchell
- Shelley Steiner
- Madeleine Philion
- Jacynthe Poirier
- Marie-Huguette Cormier

China
- Jujie Luan
- Zhu Qingyuan
- Li Huahua
- Wu Qiuhua
- Zhu Minzhu

France
- Laurence Modaine-Cessac
- Pascale Trinquet-Hachin
- Brigitte Latrille-Gaudin
- Véronique Brouquier
- Anne Meygret

Great Britain
- Ann Brannon
- Linda Ann Martin
- Fiona McIntosh
- Liz Thurley
- Katie Arup

Italy
- Dorina Vaccaroni
- Clara Mochi
- Margherita Zalaffi
- Lucia Traversa
- Carola Cicconetti

Japan
- Mieko Miyahara
- Azusa Oikawa
- Miyuki Maekawa
- Tomoko Oka

Romania
- Aurora Dan
- Monika Weber-Koszto
- Rozalia Oros
- Marcela Moldovan-Zsak
- Elisabeta Guzganu-Tufan

United States
- Vincent Bradford
- Sharon Monplaisir
- Susan Badders
- Debra Waples
- Jana Angelakis

West Germany
- Christiane Weber
- Cornelia Hanisch
- Sabine Bischoff
- Ute Kircheis-Wessel
- Zita-Eva Funkenhauser

== Results ==
=== Round 1 ===
==== Round 1 Pool A ====
The United States and France each defeated Great Britain, 9–7 and 9–3, respectively. The two victors then faced off. France won 9–2.

Pos	Team	W	L	BW	BL	Qual.	FRA	USA	GBR
1	France	2	0	18	5	QS		9–2	9–3
2	United States	1	1	11	16	QQ	2–9		9–7
3	Great Britain	0	2	10	18		3–9	7–9	

Source: Official Report, vol. 2, p. 393

==== Round 1 Pool B ====
Romania and China each defeated Canada, 9–0 and 9–3, respectively. The two victors then faced off. Romania won 9–4.

Pos	Team	W	L	BW	BL	Qual.	ROU	CHN	CAN
1	Romania	2	0	18	6	QQ		9–6	9–0
2	China	1	1	15	12	QQ	6–9		9–3
3	Canada	0	2	3	18		0–9	3–9	

Source: Official Report, vol. 2, p. 393

==== Round 1 Pool C ====
In the first set of matches, West Germany beat Argentina 9–1 and Italy defeated Japan 9–3. The second set saw the winners both win again (securing advancement) and the loser both lose again (resulting in elimination), as West Germany prevailed over Japan 9–4 and Italy won against Argentina 9–0. Finally, West Germany took the top spot in the group by beating Italy 9–4 while Argentina finished last after losing to Japan 9–1.

Pos	Team	W	L	BW	BL	Qual.	FRG	ITA	JPN	ARG
1	West Germany	3	0	27	6	QQ		9–4	9–4	9–1
2	Italy	2	1	22	12	QQ	4–9		9–3	9–0
3	Japan	1	2	16	19		4–9	3–9		9–1
4	Argentina	0	3	2	27		1–9	0–9	1–9	

Source: Official Report, vol. 2, p. 393

=== Elimination rounds ===
Quarterfinals
B1	Romania	8
A2	United States	4
A1	France
Bye
B2	China	7
C2	Italy	9
C1	West Germany
Bye

Semifinals
B1	Romania	8
A1	France	7
C2	Italy	8 (62)
C1	West Germany	8 (63)

Final
B1	Romania	5
C1	West Germany	9
Third place
A1	France	9
C2	Italy	7

Fifth Place
A2	United States	5
B2	China	9
