= Fencing at the 1988 Summer Olympics – Women's team foil =

Fencing at the Olympics

Women's team foil at the Games of the XXIV Olympiad
- Venue: Olympic Fencing Gymnasium
- Dates: 27–28 September 1988
- Competitors: 60 from 12 nations

Medalists
1st place, gold medalist(s)		Anja Fichtel-Mauritz, Zita-Eva Funkenhauser, Christiane Weber, Sabine Bau, Annette Klug	West Germany
2nd place, silver medalist(s)		Dorina Vaccaroni, Margherita Zalaffi, Francesca Bortolozzi-Borella, Lucia Traversa, Annapia Gandolfi	Italy
3rd place, bronze medalist(s)		Zsuzsa Némethné Jánosi, Gertrúd Stefanek, Zsuzsa Szőcs, Katalin Tuschák, Edit Kovács	Hungary

The women's team foil was one of eight fencing events on the fencing at the 1988 Summer Olympics programme. It was the eighth appearance of the event. The competition was held from 27 to 28 September 1988. 60 fencers from 12 nations competed.

== Rosters ==
Canada

- Marie-Huguette Cormier
- Madeleine Philion
- Jacynthe Poirier
- Shelley Steiner
- Thalie Tremblay

China

- Li Huahua
- Jujie Luan
- Sun Hongyun
- Xiao Aihua
- Zhu Qingyuan

France

- Brigitte Latrille-Gaudin
- Gisèle Meygret
- Laurence Modaine-Cessac
- Nathalie Pallet
- Isabelle Spennato

Great Britain

- Ann Brannon
- Linda Ann Martin
- Fiona McIntosh
- Linda Strachan
- Liz Thurley

Hungary

- Zsuzsa Némethné Jánosi
- Gertrúd Stefanek
- Zsuzsa Szőcs
- Katalin Tuschák
- Edit Kovács

Italy

- Dorina Vaccaroni
- Margherita Zalaffi
- Francesca Bortolozzi-Borella
- Lucia Traversa
- Annapia Gandolfi

Japan

- Nona Kiritani
- Keiko Mine
- Mieko Miyahara
- Akemi Morikawa
- Tomoko Oka

Poland

- Małgorzata Breś
- Agnieszka Dubrawska
- Jolanta Królikowska
- Hanna Prusakowska
- Anna Sobczak

South Korea

- Kim Jin-sun
- Sin Seong-Ja
- Tak Jeong-Im
- Yun Jeong-Suk
- Park Eun-Hui

Soviet Union

- Yelena Glikina
- Yelena Grishina
- Tatyana Sadovskaya
- Marina Soboleva
- Olga Voshchakina

United States

- Caitlin Bilodeaux
- Elaine Cheris
- Sharon Monplaisir
- Mary O'Neill
- Molly Sullivan

West Germany

- Anja Fichtel-Mauritz
- Zita-Eva Funkenhauser
- Christiane Weber
- Sabine Bau
- Annette Klug

== Results ==
=== Round 1 ===
==== Round 1 Pool A ====
The United States and West Germany each defeated Great Britain, 9–6 and 9–3 respectively. The winners then faced off, with West Germany winning 9–1.

Pos	Team	W	L	BW	BL	Qual.	FRG	USA	GBR
1	West Germany	2	0	18	4	Q		9–1	9–3
2	United States	1	1	10	15	Q	1–9		9–6
3	Great Britain	0	2	9	18		3–9	6–9	

Source: Official Report, vol. 2, p. 405

==== Round 1 Pool B ====
South Korea and Hungary each defeated Canada, 9–3 and 8–6 (with an insurmountable 57–46 touches advantage) respectively. The winners then faced off, with Hungary winning 9–4.

Pos	Team	W	L	BW	BL	Qual.	HUN	KOR	CAN
1	Hungary	2	0	17	10	Q		9–4	8–6
2	South Korea	1	1	13	12	Q	4–9		9–3
3	Canada	0	2	9	17		6–8	3–9	

Source: Official Report, vol. 2, p. 405

==== Round 1 Pool C ====
France and the Soviet Union each defeated Poland, 9–3 and 9–6 respectively. The winners then faced off, with the Soviet Union winning 9–4.

Pos	Team	W	L	BW	BL	Qual.	URS	FRA	POL
1	Soviet Union	2	0	18	10	Q		9–4	9–6
2	France	1	1	13	12	Q	4–9		9–3
3	Poland	0	2	9	18		6–9	3–9	

Source: Official Report, vol. 2, p. 405

==== Round 1 Pool D ====
China and Italy each defeated Japan, 9–5 and 9–0 respectively. The winners then faced off, with Italy winning 9–6.

Pos	Team	W	L	BW	BL	Qual.	ITA	CHN	JPN
1	Italy	2	0	18	6	Q		9–6	9–0
2	China	1	1	15	14	Q	6–9		9–5
3	Japan	0	2	5	18		0–9	5–9	

Source: Official Report, vol. 2, pp. 405–06

=== Elimination rounds ===
Fifth place
D2	China	8
A2	United States	8
Seventh place
C2	France	9
B2	South Korea	4

Consolation semifinals
C2	France	6
D2	China	9
B2	South Korea	2
A2	United States	9

Quarterfinals
A1	West Germany	9
C2	France	4
D2	China	7
C1	Soviet Union	8
B2	South Korea	4
D1	Italy	9
B1	Hungary	9
A2	United States	5

Semifinals
A1	West Germany	9
C1	Soviet Union	3
D1	Italy	9
B1	Hungary	3

Final
A1	West Germany	9
D1	Italy	4
Third place
C1	Soviet Union	2
B2	Hungary	9
