= Fencing at the 1984 Summer Olympics =

Fencing at the Games of the XXIII Olympiad

At the 1984 Summer Olympics in Los Angeles, eight events in fencing were contested. They were held between August 1 and 11 at the Long Beach Convention Center.

== Medal summary ==
=== Men's events ===
Games	Gold	Silver	Bronze
Individual épée	Philippe Boisse; France	Björne Väggö; Sweden	Philippe Riboud; France
team épée	West Germany; Elmar Borrmann; Volker Fischer; Gerhard Heer; Rafael Nickel; Alexander Pusch	France; Philippe Boisse; Jean-Michel Henry; Olivier Lenglet; Philippe Riboud; Michel Salesse	Italy; Stefano Bellone; Sandro Cuomo; Cosimo Ferro; Roberto Manzi; Angelo Mazzoni
Individual foil	Mauro Numa; Italy	Matthias Behr; West Germany	Stefano Cerioni; Italy
team foil	Italy; Mauro Numa; Andrea Borella; Stefano Cerioni; Angelo Scuri; Andrea Cipressa	West Germany; Matthias Behr; Matthias Gey; Harald Hein; Frank Beck; Klaus Reichert	France; Philippe Omnès; Patrick Groc; Frédéric Pietruszka; Pascal Jolyot; Marc Cerboni
individual sabre	Jean-François Lamour; France	Marco Marin; Italy	Peter Westbrook; United States
team sabre	Italy; Marco Marin; Gianfranco Dalla Barba; Giovanni Scalzo; Ferdinando Meglio; Angelo Arcidiacono	France; Jean-François Lamour; Pierre Guichot; Hervé Granger-Veyron; Philippe Delrieu; Franck Ducheix	Romania; Marin Mustață; Ioan Pop; Alexandru Chiculiță; Cornel Marin; Vilmoș Szabo

=== Women's events ===
Games	Gold	Silver	Bronze
Individual foil	Luan Jujie; China	Cornelia Hanisch; West Germany	Dorina Vaccaroni; Italy
team foil	West Germany; Ute Kircheis-Wessel; Christiane Weber; Cornelia Hanisch; Sabine Bischoff; Zita Funkenhauser	Romania; Aurora Dan; Monika Weber-Koszto; Rozalia Oros; Marcela Moldovan-Zsak; Elisabeta Guzganu-Tufan	France; Laurence Modaine; Pascale Trinquet-Hachin; Brigitte Latrille-Gaudin; Véronique Brouquier; Anne Meygret

== Medal table ==
Rank	Nation	Gold	Silver	Bronze	Total
1	Italy	3	1	3	7
2	West Germany	2	3	0	5
3	France	2	2	3	7
4	China	1	0	0	1
5	Romania	0	1	1	2
6	Sweden	0	1	0	1
7	United States	0	0	1	1
Totals (7 entries)		8	8	8	24

== Participating nations ==
A total of 262 fencers (202 men and 60 women) from 38 nations competed at the Los Angeles Games:

- Argentina (10)
- Australia (3)
- Austria (8)
- Belgium (4)
- Bolivia (1)
- Canada (15)
- China (18)
- Chinese Taipei (2)
- Egypt (6)
- France (20)
- Great Britain (20)
- Greece (1)
- Haiti (2)
- Hong Kong (5)
- Israel (4)
- Italy (20)
- Japan (9)
- Jordan (1)
- South Korea (7)
- Kuwait (9)
- Lebanon (4)
- Mexico (1)
- Monaco (1)
- New Zealand (2)
- Norway (6)
- Panama (1)
- Portugal (1)
- Puerto Rico (2)
- Romania (11)
- Saudi Arabia (7)
- Spain (2)
- Sweden (6)
- Switzerland (5)
- Turkey (2)
- United States (20)
- Virgin Islands (4)
- Venezuela (2)
- West Germany (20)

== See also ==
- Fencing at the Friendship Games
