= Romania at the 1984 Summer Olympics =

- IOC code: ROU (ROM used at these Games)
- NOC: Romanian Olympic Committee

in Los Angeles
- Competitors: 124 (71 men and 53 women) in 13 sports
- Flag bearer: Corneliu Ion
- Medals Ranked 2nd: Gold 20 Silver 16 Bronze 17 Total 53

Summer Olympics appearances (overview)
- 1900; 1904–1920; 1924; 1928; 1932; 1936; 1948; 1952; 1956; 1960; 1964; 1968; 1972; 1976; 1980; 1984; 1988; 1992; 1996; 2000; 2004; 2008; 2012; 2016; 2020; 2024; 2028

Romania competed at the 1984 Summer Olympics in Los Angeles, United States. 124 competitors, 71 men and 53 women, took part in 86 events in 13 sports. Notably, Romania was the only Eastern Bloc nation to participate at these Games; all others followed the Soviet Union's boycott of the Games. The Romanian athletes were greeted with warm applause and even a standing ovation from the spectators as they entered the Los Angeles Memorial Coliseum during the opening ceremony, in part an affirmation of the nation's defiance of the boycott. The Romanian Olympic team was phenomenally successful at the games, ultimately placing second to the United States in the gold medal tally.

== Medalists ==
Medal	Name	Sport	Event	Date
Gold	Lavinia Agache; Laura Cutina; Cristina Elena Grigoraș; Simona Păucă; Mihaela Stănuleţ; Ecaterina Szabo	Gymnastics	Women's artistic team all-around	1 August
Gold	Ion Draica	Wrestling	Men's Greco-Roman 82 kg	3 August
Gold	Vasile Andrei	Wrestling	Men's Greco-Roman 100 kg	3 August
Gold	Valeria Răcilă	Rowing	Women's single sculls	4 August
Gold	Mărioara Popescu; Elisabeta Oleniuc	Rowing	Women's double sculls	4 August
Gold	Rodica Arba; Elena Horvat	Rowing	Women's coxless pair	4 August
Gold	Chira Apostol; Maria Fricioiu; Olga Homeghi-Bularda; Viorica Ioja; Florica Lavric	Rowing	Women's coxed four	4 August
Gold	Ioana Badea; Sofia Corban; Ecaterina Oancia; Anişoara Sorohan; Maricica Țăran	Rowing	Women's quadruple sculls	4 August
Gold	Petre Becheru	Weightlifting	Men's 82.5 kg	4 August
Gold	Petru Iosub; Valer Toma	Rowing	Men's coxless pair	5 August
Gold	Ecaterina Szabo	Gymnastics	Women's vault	5 August
Gold	Ecaterina Szabo	Gymnastics	Women's balance beam	5 August
Gold	Simona Păucă	Gymnastics	Women's balance beam	5 August
Gold	Ecaterina Szabo	Gymnastics	Women's floor	5 August
Gold	Nicu Vlad	Weightlifting	Men's 90 kg	5 August
Gold	Doina Melinte	Athletics	Women's 800 metres	6 August
Gold	Anișoara Cușmir-Stanciu	Athletics	Women's long jump	9 August
Gold	Maricica Puică	Athletics	Women's 3000 metres	10 August
Gold	Agafia Constantin; Tecla Marinescu-Borcănea; Nastasia Nichitov-Ionescu; Maria Ștefan	Canoeing	Women's K-4 500 metres	11 August
Gold	Ivan Patzaichin; Toma Simionov	Canoeing	Men's C-2 1000 metres	11 August
Silver	Gelu Radu	Weightlifting	Men's 60 kg	31 July
Silver	Andrei Socaci	Weightlifting	Men's 67.5 kg	1 August
Silver	Ilie Matei	Wrestling	Men's Greco-Roman 90 kg	1 August
Silver	Corneliu Ion	Shooting	Men's 25 metre rapid fire pistol	2 August
Silver	Ecaterina Szabo	Gymnastics	Women's artistic individual all-around	3 August
Silver	Mihaela Loghin	Athletics	Women's shot put	3 August
Silver	Mihaela Armășescu; Doina Liliana Bălan; Adriana Chelariu; Camelia Diaconescu; Viorica Ioja; Aneta Mihaly; Aurora Pleșca; Lucia Sauca; Marioara Trașcă	Rowing	Women's eight	4 August
Silver	Dimitrie Popescu; Dumitru Răducanu; Vasile Tomoiagă	Rowing	Men's coxed pair	5 August
Silver	Petre Dumitru	Weightlifting	Men's 90 kg	5 August
Silver	Vasile Groapă	Weightlifting	Men's 100 kg	6 August
Silver	Aurora Dan; Elisabeta Guzganu; Rozalia Oros; Monica Veber-Koszto; Marcela Zsak	Fencing	Women's team foil	7 August
Silver	Ștefan Tașnadi	Weightlifting	Men's 110 kg	7 August
Silver	Vali Ionescu	Athletics	Women's long jump	9 August
Silver	Ivan Patzaichin; Toma Simionov	Canoeing	Men's C-2 500 metres	10 August
Silver	Doina Melinte	Athletics	Women's 1500 metres	11 August
Silver	Doina Stăiculescu	Gymnastics	Women's rhythmic individual all-around	11 August
Bronze	Dragomir Cioroslan	Weightlifting	Men's 75 kg	2 August
Bronze	Ștefan Rusu	Wrestling	Men's Greco-Roman 74 kg	2 August
Bronze	Victor Dolipschi	Wrestling	Men's Greco-Roman +100 kg	2 August
Bronze	Simona Păucă	Gymnastics	Women's artistic individual all-around	3 August
Bronze	Anca Pătrășcoiu	Swimming	Women's 200 metre backstroke	4 August
Bronze	Lavinia Agache	Gymnastics	Women's vault	5 August
Bronze	Fița Lovin	Athletics	Women's 800 metres	6 August
Bronze	Mircea Frățică	Judo	Men's 78 kg	7 August
Bronze	Cristieana Cojocaru	Athletics	Women's 400 metres hurdles	8 August
Bronze	Alexandru Chiculiță; Cornel Marin; Marin Mustață; Ioan Pop; Vilmoș Szabo	Fencing	Men's team sabre	9 August
Bronze	Mircea Fulger	Boxing	Men's light-welterweight	9 August
Bronze	Costică Olaru	Canoeing	Men's C-1 500 metres	10 August
Bronze	Romania men's national handball team: Nicolae Munteanu; Marian Dumitru; Iosif Boroș; Maricel Voinea; Vasile Stîngă; Gheorghe Dogărescu; Gheorghe Covaciu; Cornel Durău; Alexandru Fölker; Dumitru Berbece; Neculai Vasilcă; Alexandru Buligan; Vasile Oprea; Mircea Bedivan; Adrian Simion	Handball	Men's tournament	11 August
Bronze	Florența Crăciunescu	Athletics	Women's discus throw	11 August
Bronze	Maricica Puică	Athletics	Women's 1500 metres	11 August
Bronze	Mihai Cioc	Judo	Men's open category	11 August
Bronze	Vasile Pușcașu	Wrestling	Men's freestyle 100 kg	11 August

== Athletics ==
Women's 1500 metres

- Doina Melinte

- Heat — 4:10.48
- Final — 4:03.76 (→ Silver Medal)

- Maricica Puică

- Heat — 4:05.30
- Final — 4:04.15 (→ Bronze Medal)

- Fița Lovin

- Heat — 4:10.58
- Final — 4:09.11 (→ 9th place)

Women's 3000 metres

- Maricica Puică

- Heat — 8:43.32
- Final — 8:35.96 (→ Gold Medal)

Women's 400m Hurdles

- Cristieana Cojocaru

- Heat — 56.94
- Semifinal — 55.24
- Final — 55.41 (→ Bronze Medal)

Women's High Jump

- Niculina Vasile

- Qualification — 1.90m
- Final — 1.85m (→ 11th place)

Women's Long Jump

- Anișoara Cușmir-Stanciu

- Qualification — 6.69 m
- Final — 6.96 m (→ Gold Medal)

- Valy Ionescu

- Qualification — 6.60 m
- Final — 6.81 m (→ Silver Medal)

Women's Discus Throw

- Florența Crăciunescu

- Qualification — 57.84m
- Final — 63.64m (→ Bronze Medal)

Women's Shot Put

- Mihaela Loghin

- Final — 20.47 m (→ Silver Medal)

- Florența Crăciunescu

- Final — 17.23 m (→ 8th place)

== Boxing ==
Men's Featherweight (– 57 kg)

- Nicolae Talpos

- First Round — Bye
- Second Round — Lost to Meldrick Taylor (United States), 0:5

Men's Lightweight (– 60 kg)

- Viorel Ioana

- First Round — Lost to Renato Cornett (Australia), 1:4

Men's Light Welterweight (– 63.5 kg)

- Mircea Fulger → Bronze Medal

- First Round — Bye
- Second Round — Defeated Jean Duarte (France), RSC-1
- Third Round — Defeated Stefan Sjøstrand (SWE), 5:0
- Quarterfinals — Defeated Lofti Belkhir (Tunisia), 5:0
- Semifinals — Lost to Dhawee Umponmaha (Thailand), 0:5

Men's Welterweight (– 67 kg)

- Rudel Obreja

- First Round — Defeated Antoine Longoudé (RCA), KO-1
- Second Round — Defeated Michael Hughes (GBR), 5:0
- Third Round — Lost to Mark Breland (United States), 0:5

Men's Light Middleweight (– 71 kg)

- Gheorghe Simion

- First Round — Lost to Ahn Dal-Ho (South Korea), 0:5

Men's Light Heavyweight (– 81 kg)

- Georgica Donici

- First Round — Bye
- Second Round — Defeated Fine Sani (Tonga), 5:0
- Quarterfinals — Lost to Anton Josipović (Yugoslavia), 0:5

== Fencing ==
Eleven fencers, six men and five women, represented Romania in 1984.

Men's foil

- Petru Kuki

Men's sabre

- Marin Mustață
- Ioan Pop
- Cornel Marin

Men's team sabre

- Marin Mustață, Ioan Pop, Alexandru Chiculiță, Cornel Marin, Vilmoș Szabo

Women's foil

- Elisabeta Guzganu-Tufan
- Aurora Dan
- Marcela Moldovan-Zsak

Women's team foil

- Aurora Dan, Monika Weber-Koszto, Rozalia Oros, Marcela Moldovan-Zsak, Elisabeta Guzganu-Tufan

== Handball ==
Men's Team Competition

- Preliminary Round (Group A)

- Defeated Algeria (25-16)
- Defeated Iceland (26-17)
- Defeated Switzerland (23-17)
- Defeated Japan (28-22)
- Lost to Yugoslavia (18-19)

- Bronze Medal Match

- Defeated Denmark (23-19) → Bronze Medal

- Team Roster

- Mircea Bedivan
- Dumitru Berbece
- Iosif Boroș
- Alexandru Buligan
- Gheorghe Covaciu
- Gheorghe Dogărescu
- Marian Dumitru
- Cornel Durău
- Alexandru Fölker
- Nicolae Munteanu
- Vasile Oprea
- Adrian Simion
- Vasile Stîngă
- Neculai Vasilcă
- Maricel Voinea

== Rowing ==
Men

Athlete	Event	Heats		Repechage		Semifinal		Final	
Athlete	Event	Time	Rank	Time	Rank	Time	Rank	Time	Rank
Petru Iosub; Valer Toma	Coxless pair	6:56.60	2 Q	BYE		6:53.23	1 Q	6:45.39	Gold medal
Dimitrie Popescu; Vasile Tomoiagă; Dumitru Răducanu	Coxed pair	7:12.18	1 Q	BYE		—N/a		7:11.21	Silver medal

Women

Athlete	Event	Heats		Repechage		Semifinal		Final	
Athlete	Event	Time	Rank	Time	Rank	Time	Rank	Time	Rank
Valeria Răcilă	Single sculls	3:44.22	1 Q	BYE		3:54.55	1 Q	3:40.68	Gold medal
Marioara Popescu; Elisabeta Oleniuc	Double sculls	3:24.28	1 Q	BYE		—N/a		3:26.75	Gold medal
Rodica Arba; Elena Horvat	Coxless pair	—N/a						3:32.60	Gold medal
Florica Lavric; Maria Tănasă-Fricioiu; Chira Apostol; Olga Homeghi-Bularda; Viorica Ioja	Coxed four	3:21.61	1 Q	BYE		—N/a		3:19.30	Gold medal
Titie Taran; Anișoara Sorohan; Ioana Badea; Sofia Corban; Ecaterina Oancia	Quadruple sculls (coxed)	3:15.34	1 Q	BYE		—N/a		3:14.11	Gold medal
Marioara Trașcă; Lucia Sauca; Doina Șnep-Bălan; Aneta Mihaly; Aurora Pleșca; Camelia Diaconescu; Viorica Ioja; Mihaela Armășescu; Adriana Bazon-Chelariu	Eight	—N/a						2:59.80	Silver medal

== Shooting ==
Men

Athlete	Event	Final	
Athlete	Event	Score	Rank
Sorin Babii	50 m pistol	555	11
Corneliu Ion	25 m rapid fire pistol	593	Silver medal
Constantin Stan	50 metre rifle three positions	1140	20
Constantin Stan	50 metre rifle prone	591	17
Constantin Stan	10 m air rifle	577	20
Marin Stan	25 m rapid fire pistol	588	13

Women

Athlete	Event	Final	
Athlete	Event	Score	Rank
Elena Macovei	25 m pistol	572	15
Maria Macovei	25 m pistol	577	8

== Swimming ==
Women's 100m Backstroke

- Carmen Bunaciu

- Heat — 1:03.79
- Final — 1:03.21 (→ 4th place)

- Anca Pătrășcoiu

- Heat — 1:04.16
- Final — 1:03.29 (→ 5th place)

Women's 200m Backstroke

- Anca Pătrășcoiu

- Heat — 2:16.71
- Final — 2:13.29 (→ Bronze Medal)

- Carmen Bunaciu

- Heat — 2:16.41
- Final — 2:16.15 (→ 7th place)

Women's 400m Individual Medley

- Anca Pătrășcoiu

- Heat — 5:03.97
- B-Final — 5:05.53 (→ 16th place)
