= Lydia Hatuel-Czuckermann =

Israeli fencer (born 1963)

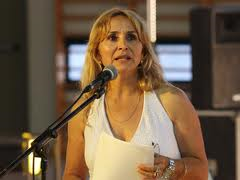
- Lydia Hatuel-Czuckermann

Personal information
- Native name: לידיה חטואל-צוקרמן
- Nationality: Israeli
- Born: Lydia Hatuel; August 15, 1963 (age 63) Casablanca, Morocco
- Height: 5 ft 6 in (168 cm)
- Weight: 121 lb (55 kg)

Sport
- Country: Israel
- Sport: Fencing
- Event: Foil

Achievements and titles
- Olympic finals: Los Angeles 1984 - 26th Barcelona 1992 - 23rd Atlanta 1996 - 13th
- Highest world ranking: 16th in the world in 1996 and 1997, reached the top 8
Medal record
Women's fencing
Representing Israel
Maccabiah Games
Bronze medal – third place	2001 Israel	Individual Women's Foil

Lydia Hatuel-Czuckermann (Hebrew: לידיה חטואל-צוקרמן; born August 15, 1963, in Casablanca, Morocco) is an Israeli fencer. One of Israel's top female fencers, she competed in the individual foil event at the 1984, 1992, and 1996 Olympiads. Her fencing career started at the age of 8, she maintained an international ranking until 2004, and she still competed at the national level in 2012.

== Early and personal life ==
Hatuel-Czuckermann was born in Casablanca, Morocco on August 15, 1963, one of nine children born to Jewish Moroccan parents. The family immigrated to Israel, making aliyah, later that year, living in a housing project in Acre, Israel. Inspired by their father's interest in fencing and general athletics, she and her siblings trained together, ultimately reaching Olympic status as adults. Though the family was close-knit, several of them fell into criminal activity, most notably, her brother Uri Hatuel and later, Uri's son Kobi, both of whom have been charged by Israeli authorities for drug trafficking.

She has a master's degree in physical education, and works in special education.

== Fencing career ==
=== Israeli champion ===
Hatuel-Czuckermann first won the Israeli national title in 1979, when she was 16. She eventually won the title more than 20 times, including 16 consecutive years, and was listed in the Guinness Book of World Records.

=== Olympics ===
She missed her first chance at the Olympics at the 1980 Moscow Olympic Games because of the international 1980 Summer Olympics boycott.

At the 1984 Los Angeles Olympic Games, at the age of 20, she won all six of her bouts in the first round (defeating Sheila Viard of Haiti, Silvana Giancola of Argentina, Mieko Miyahara of Japan, Margherita Zalaffi of Italy, Fiona McIntosh of Great Britain, and Veronique Brouquier of France), but was eliminated in the quarterfinals in which she went 1-3 (defeating O Seung-Sun of South Korea). She finished in 26th place.

She did not compete in the 1988 Seoul Olympics because the fencing competition fell on Yom Kippur.

At the 1992 Barcelona Games she went 3–2 in Round 1 (defeating Renée Aubin of Canada, Annette Dobmeier of Germany, and Ildikó Mincza-Nébald of Hungary), then won a barrage match against Yelena Glikina of Germany but lost in the final pool. She finished in 23rd place.

At the 1996 Atlanta Games, she was Israel's flag bearer. She was seeded number 12, had a bye in Round One, won her first match in Round Two over Felicia Zimmerman of the US, but lost 15–13 in Round Three to two-time team silver medalist number 5 seed Monika Weber-Koszto of Germany. She finished in 13th place. She also competed in the team foil event, along with Ayelet Ohayon, Lilach Parisky, and Ira Slivotsky. The Israelis, who were seeded number 9, lost to China in the first round (29–45), but defeated the United States (45–39; with her defeating Zimmerman and Suzanne Paxton). They finished in 9th place.

=== World Championships and World Cup ===
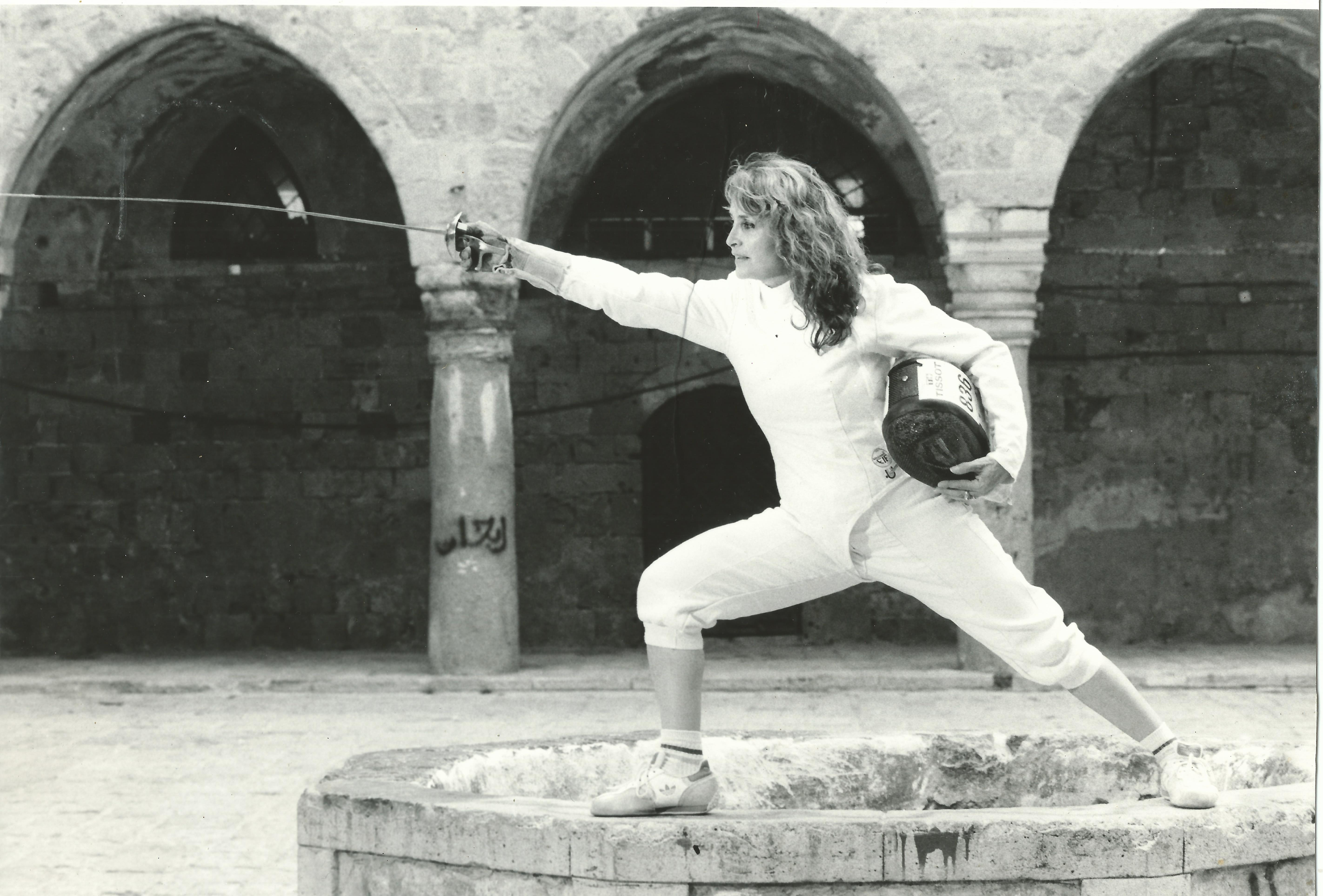
Lydia Hatuel Czuckermann - Olympic Fencer

In 1991, she finished 8th in the World Championships, and in 1996 she was ranked 8th in World Cup.

=== Olympic Games ===
1980 Moscow, Russia, didn't participate because of the 1980 Summer Olympics boycott

1984 Los Angeles, USA, 26th

1988 Seoul, Korea, didn't participate because of the Day of Atonement

1992 Barcelona, Spain, 23rd

1996 Atlanta, USA, 13th - Flag bearer

=== World Championships ===
1982 Rome, Italy, 52nd

1983 Vienna, Austria, 26th

1986 Sofia, Bulgaria, 22nd

1987 Lousanne, Switzerland, 20th

1989 Denver, USA, 18th

1990 Lyon, France, 16th

1991 Budapest, Hungary, 8th - highest rank

1994 Athens, Greece, 15th

1995 The Hague, the Netherlands, 38th

1999 Seoul, Korea, 73rd.

2001 Nîmes, France, 14th.

2002 Lisbon, Portugal, 43rd

=== European Championships ===
She reached the semi-finals at the European Championships in 2002.

=== Maccabiah Games ===
She won the bronze medal in the individual foil competition at the 2001 Maccabiah Games.

== Public activity ==
=== Sports ===
In 1996, right after the Atlanta Olympics, she was among the founders of the Israeli Olympic Athletes Committee, and retained her membership until 2009.

Between 2004 and 2009 she was a member of the Olympic Committee of Israel. From 2010 to 2012 she served as Chairman of the Israeli Fencing Association. In 2012, she was Director of Sports Activities for Acre.

=== Politics ===
In 2012, she was among the organizers of the Gilad Shalit Cycling for Peace ride.

== Academics ==
She published an article in the field of ADHD - "Hyperactivity\Impulsivity Amelioration Effects of a Fencing Training Program on Children Diagnosed with Attention Deficit Hyperactivity Disorder", at DISCOBOLUL; Physical Education, Sport and Kinetotherapy Journal (October–December 2016).

== Family ==
Hatuel-Czuckermann has been married to Robert Czuckermann since 1989 and the two have four children together, sons Idan, Matan, and Niran, and daughter Lihi. With the exception of Lihi, all of her children are competitive fencers with the Fédération Internationale d'Escrime. Other notable members of her family include her brother, Yitzhak Hatuel, and her niece, Delila Hatuel, both of whom are fencers.

== See also ==
- List of select Jewish fencers
- Sport in Israel
- The Truth About the Jewish Mother
- Football for Peace?
