= Nili Drori =

Israeli fencer

Personal information
- Native name: נילי דרורי
- Born: 7 August 1960 (age 65) Moshav Magshimim, Israel
- Height: 165 cm (5 ft 5 in)
- Weight: 56 kg (123 lb)
- Relative: İrem Karamete (daughter)

Sport
- Country: Israel
- Sport: Fencing
- Event: foil
Medal record
Women's fencing
Representing Israel Asian Games
Bronze medal – third place	1974 Tehran	Foil, team

Nili Drori (Hebrew: נילי דרורי; born 7 August 1960) is an Israeli Olympic foil fencer. She won a bronze medal at the 1974 Asian Games in Tehran, Iran, in team foil. She then competed in both the 1976 Olympics in Montreal, at 15 years of age, and the 1984 Olympics in Los Angeles. Her daughter İrem Karamete fenced for Turkey in foil in the 2016 Summer Olympics.

== Fencing career ==
Drori won a bronze medal at the 1974 Asian Games in Tehran, Iran, in team foil.

She competed in the women's individual foil events at the 1976 and 1984 Summer Olympics.

At the 1976 Summer Olympics in Montreal, Canada, at the age of 15, Drori went 2-3 in Round One (defeating Mahvash Shafaie of Iran and Maria Collino of Italy—who won the silver medal), and 1-4 in Round Two (defeating Carola Mangiarotti of Italy).

At the 1984 Summer Olympics in Los Angeles, California, at the age of 23, she went 3-3 in Round One (defeating Miyuki Maekawa of Japan, Vincent Bradford of the United States, and María Alicia Sinigaglia of Argentina), 3-1 in the quarterfinals (defeating Jana Angelakis of the United States, Marcela Moldovan-Zsak of Romania, and Sabine Bischoff of West Germany), and 1-4 in the semifinals (defeating Debra Waples of the United States).

== Personal life ==
Drori is the adopted daughter of Edith (née Ernst) and Shlomo Drori. The family lived first in moshav Magshimim, Israel, and then moved in 1979 to Haifa, Israel.

Her mother Edith was born in 1920 in Dunaharaszti, Hungary, moved to Slovakia, and Edith's mother and older brother were killed by the Nazis during the Holocaust. Edith then joined a small anti-Nazi underground cell in the Sitno Mountains in Slovakia, and later joined the 1944 Slovak National Uprising against the Nazis and was the only female among 200 fighters. After the Second World War, Edith was awarded the Red Star Medal of High Merit, and the Order of the Hero of the Slovak People. Edith emigrated to Israel in July 1948, and married Shlomo in 1952.

Drori has 2 daughters.Their names are Merve Karamete and Irem Karamete. Both of them were national team fencer. İrem Karamete competed for Turkey in foil in the 2016 Summer Olympics. Drori's husband, Mehmet Karamete, whom she married in 1985, coached both the Israeli and the German national fencing teams.

== See also ==
- List of Asian Games medalists in fencing
