= Ștefan Haukler =

Romanian fencer and coach

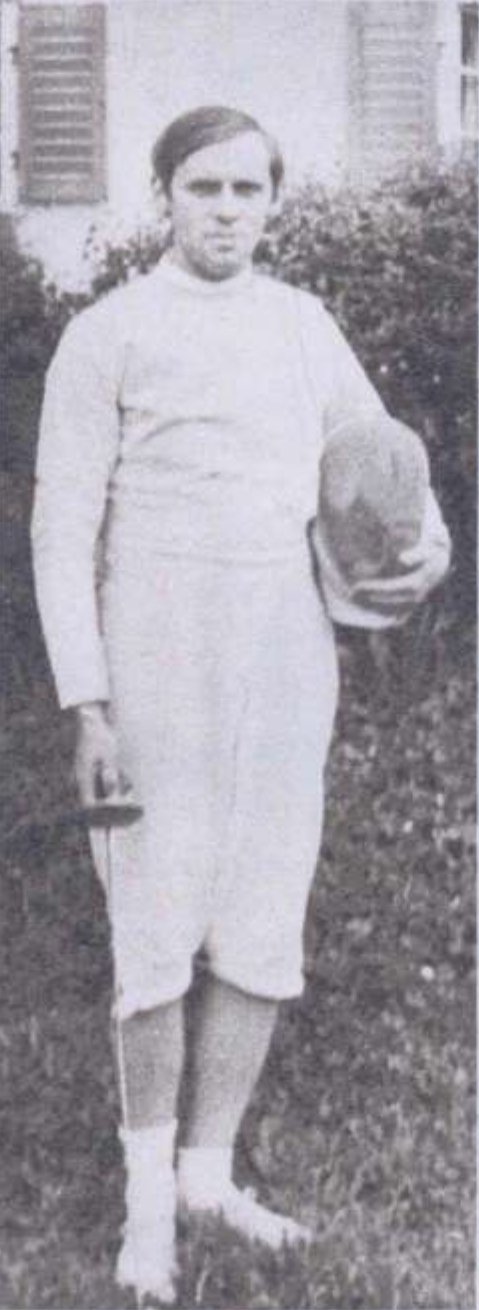

Personal information
- Born: 9 March 1942 Satu Mare, Romania
- Died: 23 November 2006 (aged 64) Budapest, Hungary
- Height: 1.79 m (5 ft 10 1/2 in)

Fencing career
- Sport: Fencing
- Weapon: foil, épée
- Hand: right-handed
- Club: Olimpia Satu Mare
Medal record
Men's foil
Representing Romania
World Championships
Bronze medal – third place	1969 Havana	Team foil
Bronze medal – third place	1970 Ankara	Team foil

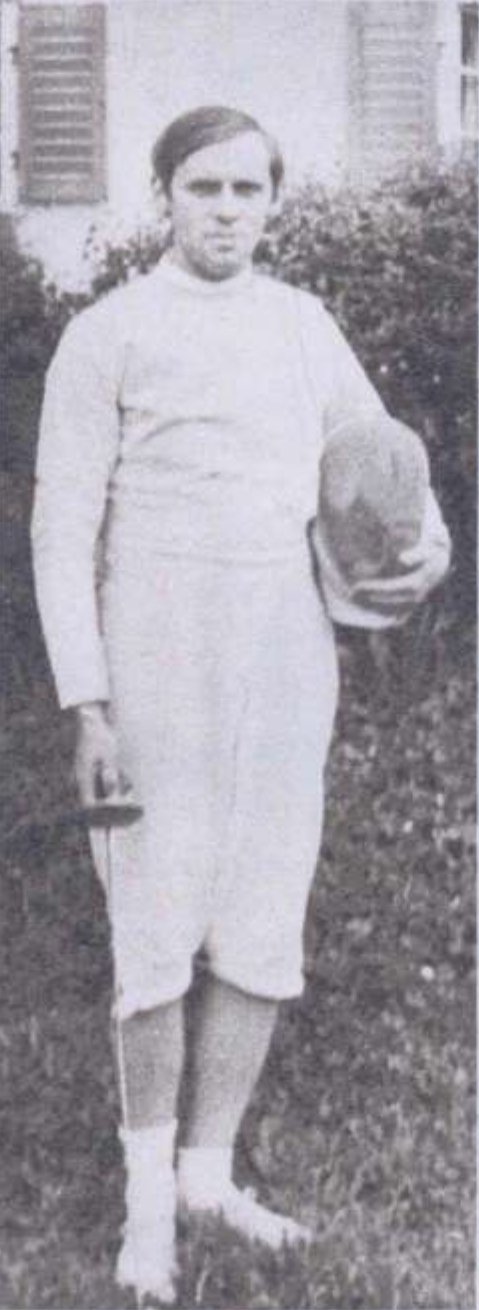
Ștefan Haukler, 1970

Ștefan Haukler (9 March 1942 – 23 November 2006) was a Romanian fencer and coach.

== Career ==
Haukler took up fencing at the age of ten under the coaching of Alexandru Csipler at local clubs Unio, then Olimpia Satu Mare. He won three titles of national champion in épée, first in the junior category, then in the senior category. With the Romanian national team he won bronze medals in the 1969 and the 1970 World Championships. He competed at the 1964, 1968 and 1972 Summer Olympics.

After his retirement as an athlete, he became a fencing coach and worked with his former master Alexandru Csipler. He was principal coach of the national women's foil team from 1980 to 1986. Assisted by Ștefan Ardeleanu and Tudor Petruș, he led Aurora Dan, Monika Weber-Koszto, Rozalia Oros, Marcela Moldovan-Zsak and Elisabeta Guzganu-Tufan to a silver medal in the 1984 Summer Olympics. In 1986 he moved to Offenbach am Main, where he coached amongst others épée fencers Katja Nass, Eva-Maria Ittner, Dagmar Ophardt and Marijana Marković. He retired in 2003 for health reasons and died in Budapest in 2006. The Stefan-Haukler-Gedächtnisturniers, part of the junior national women's épée circuit, is organized every year in his memory by the Offenbach fencing club.
