= Giancola =

Giancola is a surname. Notable people with the surname include:

- Dan Giancola, placekicker in the Canadian Football League
- David Giancola, American filmmaker
- Donato Giancola, American artist
- Rick Giancola, American football coach
- Sammi Giancola, American television personality
- Sandra Giancola, Argentine fencer
- Silvana Giancola, Argentine fencer
