= İrem Karamete =

Turkish-Israeli fencer (born 1993)

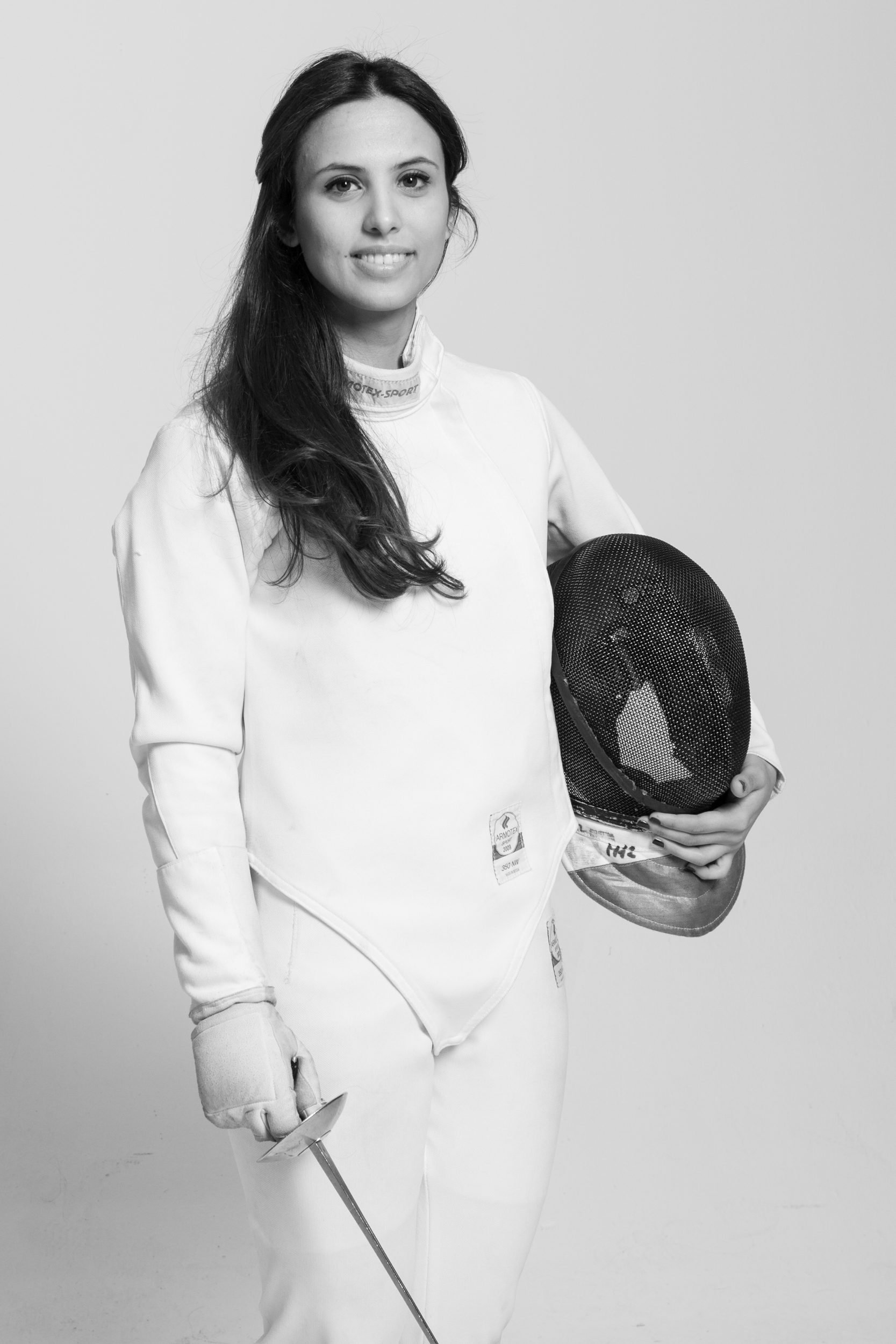
- İrem Karamete (April 2016)

Personal information
- Full name: İrem Karamete
- National team: Turkey
- Born: İrem Karamete; 20 June 1993 (age 33) Istanbul, Turkey
- Education: Özyeğin University; Boston University
- Height: 168 cm (5 ft 6 in)
- Weight: 60 kg (132 lb)
- Relative: Nili Drori (mother)

Sport
- Country: Turkey
- Sport: Fencing
- Event: Foil
- Coached by: Damir Sayfutdinov
- Now coaching: Andrea Baldini
Medal record
Women's fencing
Representing Turkey
Mediterranean Games
Bronze medal – third place	2013 Mersin	Individual foil
Bronze medal – third place	2022 Oran	Individual foil
Islamic Solidarity Games
Gold medal – first place	2021 Konya	Individual foil
Gold medal – first place	2021 Konya	Team foil
- Updated on 15 August 2025

İrem Karamete (born 20 June 1993) is a Turkish fencer who competed in the foil event at the 2016 Summer Olympics, coming in 27th. Her mother, Nili Drori, fenced for Israel in the 1976 and 1984 Olympics, and won a team foil bronze medal in the 1974 Asian Games. Karamete won the Turkish Championship 10 times between 2011 and 2019, and won a bronze medal in the women's individual foil event at the 2022 Mediterranean Games. Karamete was the first Turkish fencer to qualify for the Olympics since 1984.

== Early life ==
Karamete was born into a fencing family in Istanbul, Turkey. Her father Mehmet Karamete coached the Israeli and German national fencing teams, as well as his future spouse Nili Drori. İrem's mother Nili competed in the women's individual foil events for Israel at the 1976 Olympics in Montreal and 1984 Olympics in Los Angeles, and won a bronze medal in team foil at the 1974 Asian Games. Her older sister Merve also competed in fencing, and was a member of the national team.

Karamete completed her bachelor's degree in industrial engineering with an athletic scholarship at Ozyegin University, Istanbul. She was the captain of her university's fencing team where she also won four individual titles in a row. In 2019, she completed her master's degree in global marketing management at Boston University, in the United States.

== Sports career ==
Karamete started fencing at the age of 10. In five years she reached the national team representing Turkey in international competitions. In those years, she also won the " Turkish Champion " title in the cadet & junior categories several times. She competed in many European and World Cadet & Junior championships, reaching the top 16 at the 2009 tournament in Bourges, France. Karamete won a bronze medal at the Cadet & Junior Mediterranean Championships the same year.

Karamete won the Turkish Championship 10 times between 2011 and 2019.

In 2012, Karamete took the gold medal at the Mediterranean Junior and Cadet Fencing Championship held in Poreč, Croatia after the Turkish women's fencing team defeated France in the final. In the same season, Karamete finished in the top 16 at both Junior World Cups in Budapest and Belgrade.

Karamete took the bronze medal at the 2013 Mediterranean Games in Mersin, Turkey. She was the first Turkish woman to obtain a medal in fencing for her country in 42 years.

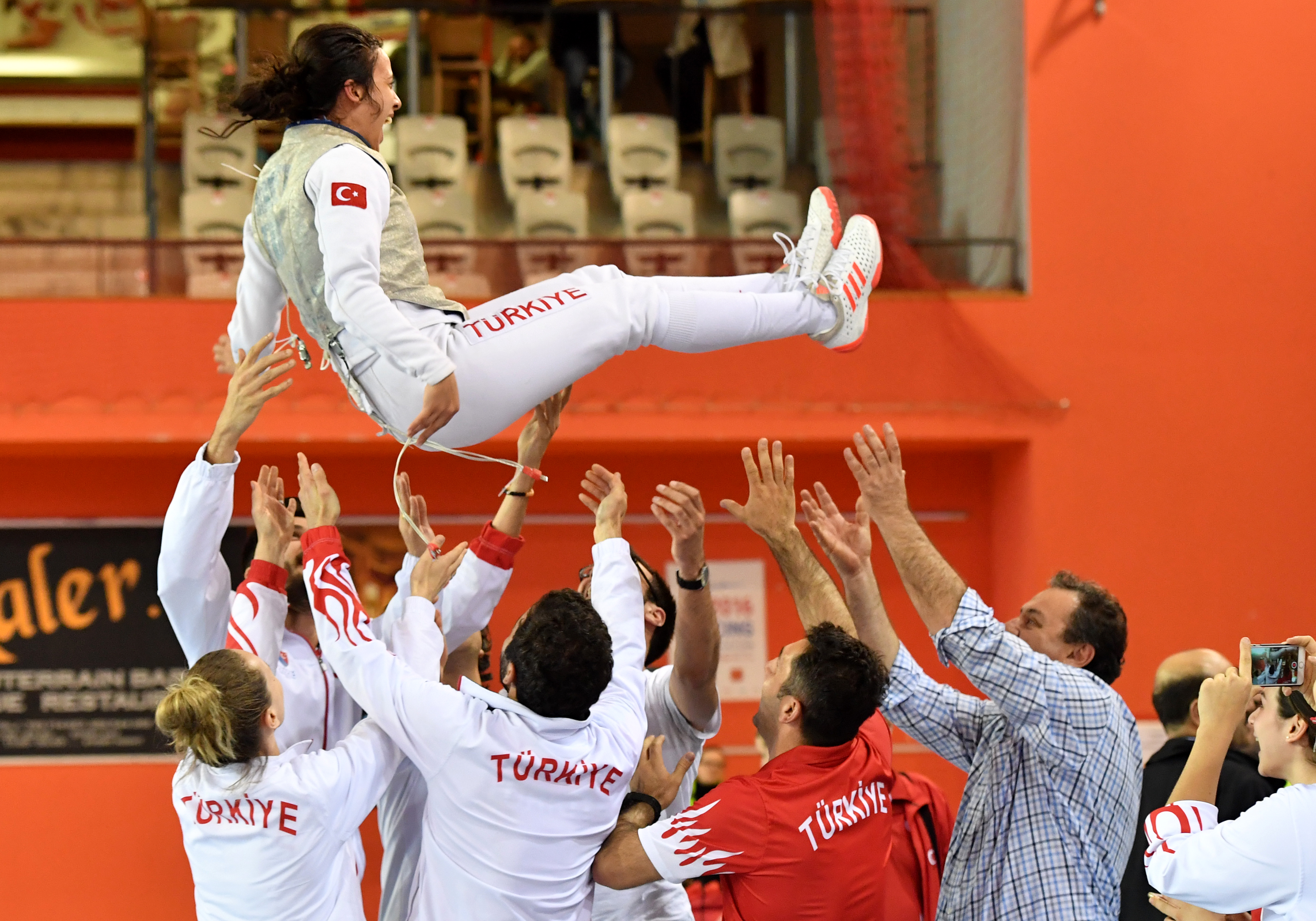
2016 Summer Olympics qualification celebration

In the 2014–2015 season, Karamete took a silver medal in Cancún, Mexico, a gold medal in Antalya, Turkey, a bronze medal both in Kocaeli, Turkey and Copenhagen, Denmark at the satellite tournament events. She represented her country at the 2015 European Games in Baku, Azerbaijan. Karamete was the silver medalist at the 2015 Balkan Championships in Niš, Serbia.

Karamete qualified for participation at the 2016 Rio Olympics, where she came in 27th, after a successful showing at the 2016 Summer Olympics – Qualification tournament held in Prague, Czech Republic. In doing so, she became the first Turkish fencer to compete at the Olympics since the 1984 competition.

In May 2018, Karamete won the bronze medal representing her country at the Satellite Cup Bucharest. At the end of the season, she finished in the Top 16 at the Senior European Championship in Novi Sad, Serbia, and Top 32 at the Senior World Championships in Wuxi, China.

In the 2019–2020 season, the road to the Tokyo 2020 Olympic Games, Karamete obtained the following results representing Turkey: a gold medal in Antalya, bronze medals at the senior satellite tournament events in Bucharest and Amsterdam, and Top 32 at the Turin Grand Prix. These finishes gave her important points for Olympic qualification goals.

She competed at the 2022 European Fencing Championships held in Antalya, Turkey. She won one of the bronze medals in the women's individual foil event at the 2022 Mediterranean Games held in Oran, Algeria.

== Personal life ==
On 29 July 2020, Karamete married her coach, Italian Olympic fencer Andrea Baldini, in Istanbul.
