= Meygret =

Meygret is a surname. Notable people with the surname include:

- Anne Meygret (born 1965), French fencer
- Gisèle Meygret (1963–1999), French fencer
