= Fencing at the 1987 Summer Universiade =

Fencing events were contested at the 1987 Summer Universiade in Zagreb, Yugoslavia.

== Medal overview ==
=== Men's events ===
Event	Gold	Silver	Bronze
Individual Foil	Zsolt Érsek (HUN)	István Szelei (HUN)	Pál Szekeres (HUN)
Team Foil	Cuba (CUB)	Soviet Union (URS)	Italy (ITA)
Individual Épée	Andrea Bermond (ITA)	Stefano Pantano (ITA)	Carlos Pedroso (CUB)
Team Épée	Italy (ITA)	Canada (CAN)	Cuba (CUB)
Individual Sabre	Bence Szabó (HUN)	Yuriy Kuznetsov (URS)	Ferdinando Meglio (ITA)
Team Sabre	Hungary (HUN)	Soviet Union (URS)	Italy (ITA)

=== Women's events ===
Event	Gold	Silver	Bronze
Individual Foil	Lucia Traversa (ITA)	Annapia Gandolfi (ITA)	Zhu Yan (CHN)
Team Foil	Italy (ITA)	China (CHN)	Soviet Union (URS)

== Medal table ==
Rank	Nation	Gold	Silver	Bronze	Total
1	Italy (ITA)	4	2	3	9
2	Hungary (HUN)	3	1	1	5
3	Cuba (CUB)	1	0	2	3
4	Soviet Union (URS)	0	3	1	4
5	China (CHN)	0	1	1	2
6	Canada (CAN)	0	1	0	1
Totals (6 entries)		8	8	8	24
