= Miklós Bodoczi =

Romanian épée fencer

Miklós-Gábor Bodoczi
Personal information
- Nationality: Romanian
- Born: 9 May 1962 (age 64) Satu Mare, Romania

Sport
- Country: Romania
- Sport: Fencing
- Event: Épée
Medal record
Representing Romania
World Championships
Silver medal – second place	1986 Sofia	Individual épée
Summer Universiade
Silver medal – second place	1983 Edmonton	Individual épée

Miklós-Gábor Bodoczi (born 9 May 1962) is a former Romanian fencer who competed internationally in the discipline of épée. He won a silver medal in the men's individual épée event at the 1986 World Fencing Championships, representing Romania. He also fenced for Romanian in the men's individual épée at the 1983 Summer Universiade and won silver. He was Romania's national men's épée champion in 1982 and 1989.
