= Zsuzsa Jánosi =

Hungarian fencer (born 1963)

Personal information
- Born: 19 January 1963 (age 63) Budapest, Hungary

Sport
- Sport: Fencing
Medal record
Women's fencing
Representing Hungary
Olympic Games
Bronze medal – third place	1988 Seoul	Team foil
World Championships
Gold medal – first place	1987 Lausanne	Team foil
Silver medal – second place	1985 Barcelona	Team foil
Bronze medal – third place	1983 Vienna	Team foil
Bronze medal – third place	1994 Athens	Team foil
Summer Universiade
Silver medal – second place	1989 Duisburg	Individual foil

Zsuzsanna Jánosi (born 19 November 1963) is a Hungarian fencer, who won a bronze medal in the team foil competition at the 1988 Summer Olympics, in Seoul together with Zsuzsanna Szőcs, Katalin Tuschák, Edit Kovács and Gertrúd Stefanek.
