= Al-'Abbasiyya =

Al-'Abbasiyya العبْاسِيّة/اليهودية al-Abbasiya, al-Yahudiya, Yehudiya
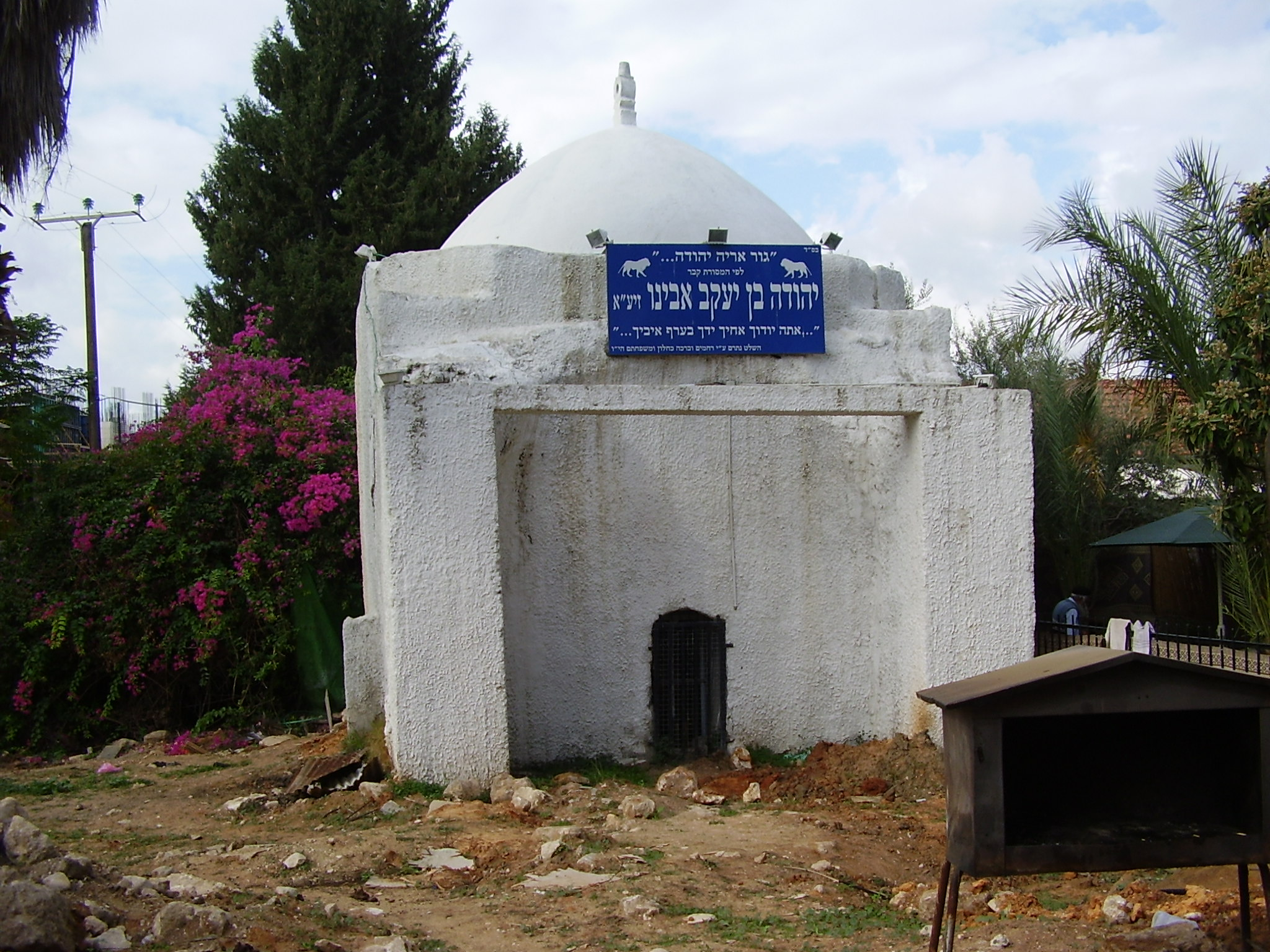
- Tomb of Judah (Ar: Huda ibn-Yaaqub) in Yehud, originally a Muslim shrine, but today a Jewish one

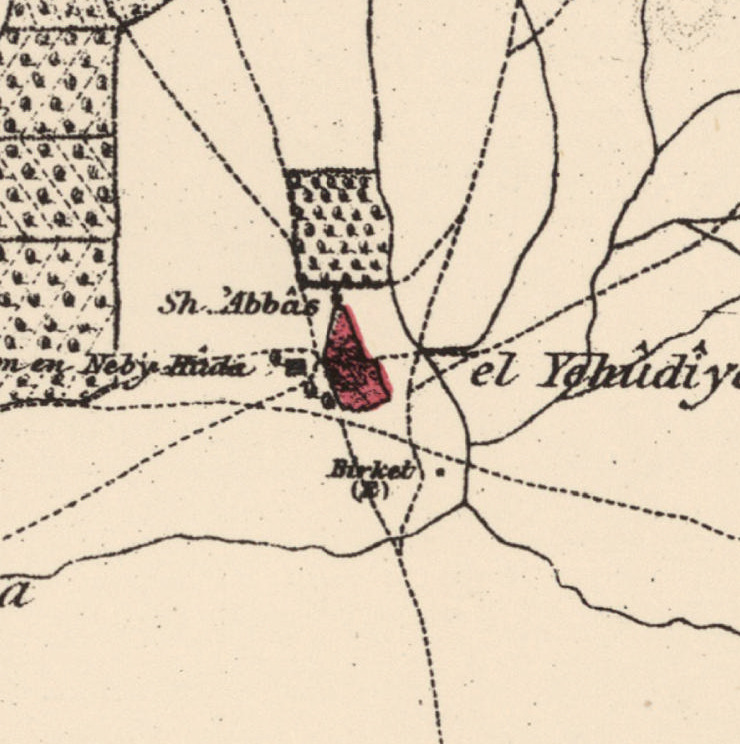
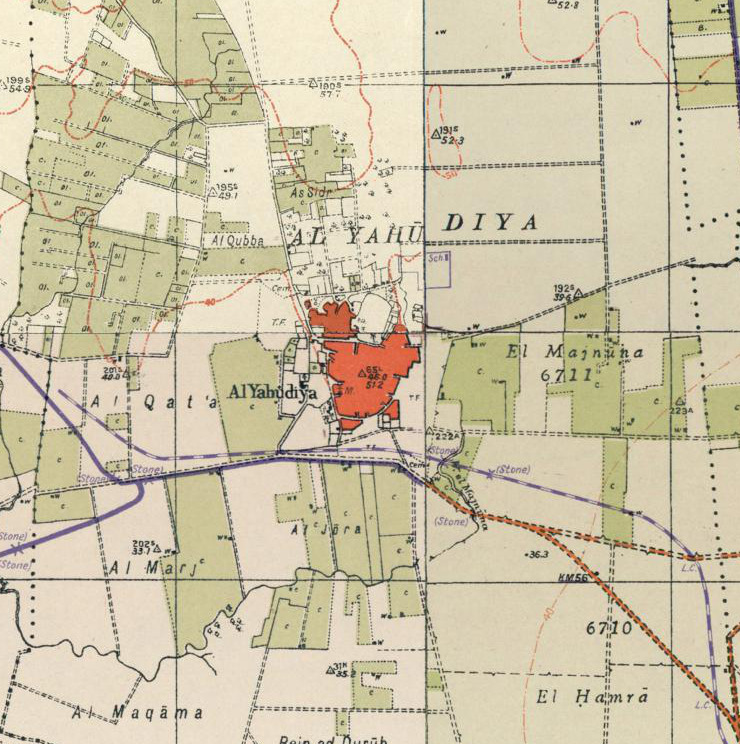
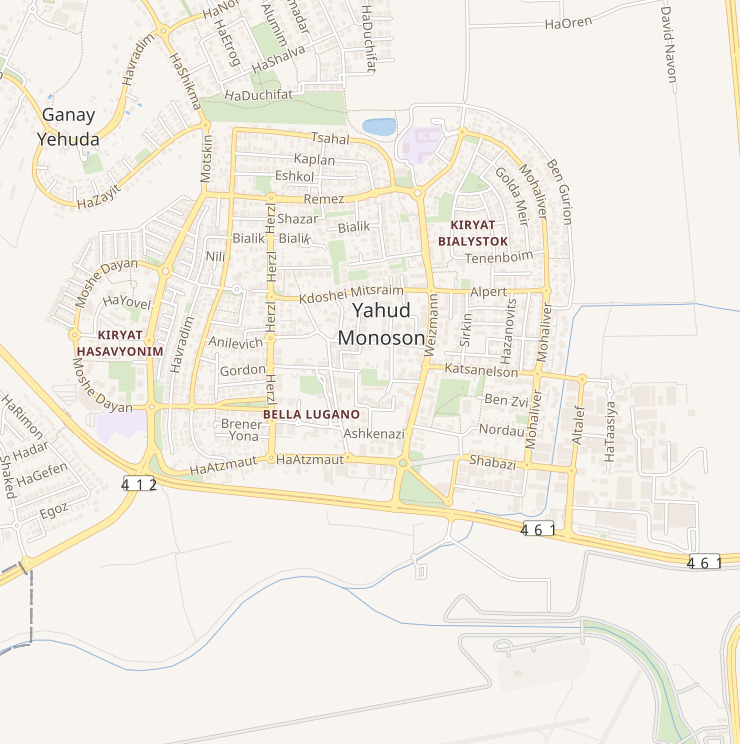
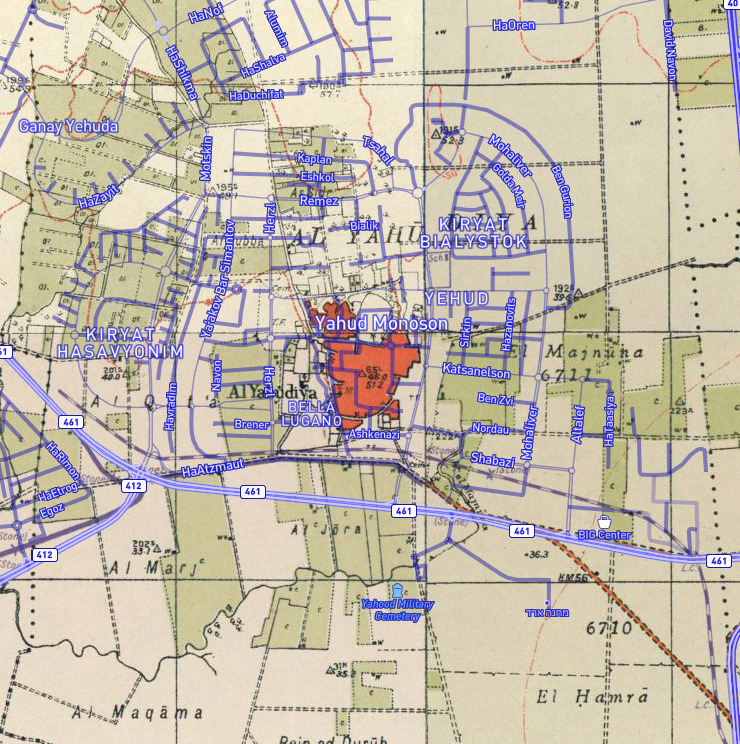
- 1870s map 1940s map modern map 1940s with modern overlay map A series of historical maps of the area around Al-'Abbasiyya (click the buttons)

- Location within Mandatory Palestine
- Coordinates: 32°01′53″N 34°53′25″E
- Palestine grid: 139/159
- Geopolitical entity: Mandatory Palestine
- Subdistrict: Jaffa
- Date of depopulation: May 4, 1948

Area
  - Total: 20,540 dunams (20.54 km^{2}; 7.93 sq mi)

Population (1945)
  - Total: 5,800
- Cause(s) of depopulation: Military assault by Yishuv forces
- Current Localities: Yehud, Magshimim, Ganne Yehuda, Ganne Tiqwa, and Savyon

Al-'Abbasiyya (Arabic: العبْاسِيّة), also known before the 1930s as al-Yahudiya (Arabic: اليهودية), was a Palestinian Arab village in the Jaffa Subdistrict. It was attacked under Operation Hametz during the 1948 Palestine War, and finally depopulated under Operation Dani. It was located 13 km east of Jaffa. Some of the remains of the village can be found today in the centre of the modern Israeli city of Yehud.

== History ==
In 1596, Yahudiya appeared in Ottoman tax registers as being in the Nahiya of Ramla of the Liwa of Gaza. It had a population of 126 Muslim households and paid taxes on wheat, barley, summer crops or fruit trees, sesame, and goats or beehives.

In 1838 it was noted as a Muslim village called el-Yehudiyeh in the Lydda administrative region.

The French explorer Victor Guérin visited the village, which he called Yehoudieh, in 1863, and found it to have a population of more than 1,000 people. The houses were made of adobe bricks, several topped by palm leaves. Near a noria he noticed an ancient sarcophagus, placed there as a trough.

An Ottoman village list from about 1870 found that el-jehudie had a population of 835, in 246 houses, though the population count included men, only.

In 1882, the PEF's Survey of Western Palestine (SWP) described the place as "a large mud village, supplied by a pond, and surrounded by palm-trees." They also noted a ruined tank, or birkeh, to the south of the village.

=== British Mandate era ===
In the 1922 census of Palestine, conducted by the British Mandate authorities, Yahudiyeh had a population of 2,437 residents, all Muslims, increasing in the 1931 census, when Yahudiya had a population of 3,258 residents; 3,253 Muslims and 5 Christians, in a total of 772 houses.

The previous name, Al-Yahudiya, is thought to be taken from the name of the biblical town of Yahud, mentioned in Joshua 19:45 (as part of a list of towns comprising the territory of the Israelite tribe of Dan), and later called Iudaea by the Romans. In 1932, the town was officially renamed Al-'Abbasiyya, because the inhabitants did not want the town to be associated with Jews. The name chosen as a replacement, Al-'Abbasiyya, was mostly in honour of the memory of a sheikh called al-'Abbas who was buried in the town, but also alluded to the Arab Muslim Abbasid Caliphate.

In the 1945 statistics, the population had increased to 5,800; 5,630 Muslims, 150 Jews, and 20 Christians, with a total of 20,540 dunums of land. Of this, a total of 4,099 dunums was used for citrus and bananas, 1,019 dunums were irrigated or used for orchards, 14,465 were for cereals, while 101 dunams were classified as built-up areas.

=== 1948 and after ===
On December 13, 1947, twenty-four armed men from the hard-right paramilitary organization Irgun attacked the village, approaching from the Jewish town of Petaḥ Tiqvah. The attackers wore khaki uniforms and drove through the village in four cars. One group fired on villagers at a cafe and another set bombs and grenades in houses. Seven Arabs were killed (two women and two children under the age of five) and seven others seriously wounded (two women and a four-year-old girl among them). An armored British police vehicle was fired upon by the attackers.

On September 13, 1948, David Ben-Gurion requested the destruction of Al-'Abbasiyya, among other Palestinian villages whose inhabitants fled or were expelled.

Between 1948 and 1954 the Israeli sites of Yehud, Magshimim, Ganne Yehuda, Ganne Tiqwa, and Savyon were established on the land of Al-'Abbasiyya. Yehud was founded on the same site and 4,000 immigrants were settled there during 1948.

In 1992 the village site was described:

The main mosque and the shrine of al-Nabi Huda till stand. The mosque is deserted and beginning to crack in several places; the shrine is made of stone and surmounted with a dome. There is also an Israeli coffee shop, called the Tehr coffee shop, at the entrance of a main street that was called Ziqaq al-Raml ("Sand Lane"). A number of houses remain; they have been occupied by Yehud's Jewish residents or put to other uses. One residential house, made of concrete, has a slanted roof and rectangular doors and windows; its porch is covered by corrugated metal sheets. Another house, a two-storey, concrete structure with rectangular doors and windows and I tiled, tent-shaped roof, has been converted into a commercial building. The land around the site (only partially covered by construction) has been left untended and is overgrown with pine and Christ's-thorn trees.

== Bibliography ==
- Barron, J.B., ed. (1923). Palestine: Report and General Abstracts of the Census of 1922. Government of Palestine.
- Benvenisti, M. (2001). Sacred Landscape: The Buried History of the Holy Land Since 1948. University of California Press. ISBN 978-0-520-23422-2.
- Conder, C.R.; Kitchener, H.H. (1882). The Survey of Western Palestine: Memoirs of the Topography, Orography, Hydrography, and Archaeology. Vol. 2. London: Committee of the Palestine Exploration Fund.
- Department of Statistics (1945). Village Statistics, April, 1945. Government of Palestine.
- Guérin, V. (1868). Description Géographique Historique et Archéologique de la Palestine. Vol 1, Judee, pt. 1. Paris, L'Imprimerie Imp.
- Hadawi, S. (1970). Village Statistics of 1945: A Classification of Land and Area ownership in Palestine. Palestine Liberation Organization Research Center. Archived from the original on 2018-12-08.
- Hartmann, M. (1883). "Die Ortschaftenliste des Liwa Jerusalem in dem türkischen Staatskalender für Syrien auf das Jahr 1288 der Flucht (1871)". Zeitschrift des Deutschen Palästina-Vereins. 6: 102–149.
- Hütteroth, W.-D.; Abdulfattah, K. (1977). Historical Geography of Palestine, Transjordan and Southern Syria in the Late 16th Century. Erlanger Geographische Arbeiten, Sonderband 5. Erlangen, Germany: Vorstand der Fränkischen Geographischen Gesellschaft. ISBN 3-920405-41-2.
- Khalidi, W. (1992). All That Remains: The Palestinian Villages Occupied and Depopulated by Israel in 1948. Washington D.C.: Institute for Palestine Studies. ISBN 0-88728-224-5.
- Mills, E, ed. (1932). Census of Palestine 1931. Population of Villages, Towns and Administrative Areas. Jerusalem: Government of Palestine.
- Morris, B. (2004). The Birth of the Palestinian Refugee Problem Revisited. Cambridge University Press. ISBN 978-0-521-00967-6.
- Palmer, E.H. (1881). The Survey of Western Palestine: Arabic and English Name Lists Collected During the Survey by Lieutenants Conder and Kitchener, R. E. Transliterated and Explained by E.H. Palmer. Committee of the Palestine Exploration Fund.
- Robinson, E.; Smith, E. (1841). Biblical Researches in Palestine, Mount Sinai and Arabia Petraea: A Journal of Travels in the year 1838. Vol. 3. Boston: Crocker & Brewster.
- Sa'di, A.H.; Abu-Lughod, L. (2007). Nakba: Palestine, 1948, and the claims of memory (Illustrated ed.). Columbia University Press. ISBN 978-0-231-13579-5.
- Socin, A. (1879). "Alphabetisches Verzeichniss von Ortschaften des Paschalik Jerusalem". Zeitschrift des Deutschen Palästina-Vereins. 2: 135–163.
