= Magshimim =

Moshav in central Israel

Magshimim: מַגְשִׁימִים (Hebrew)
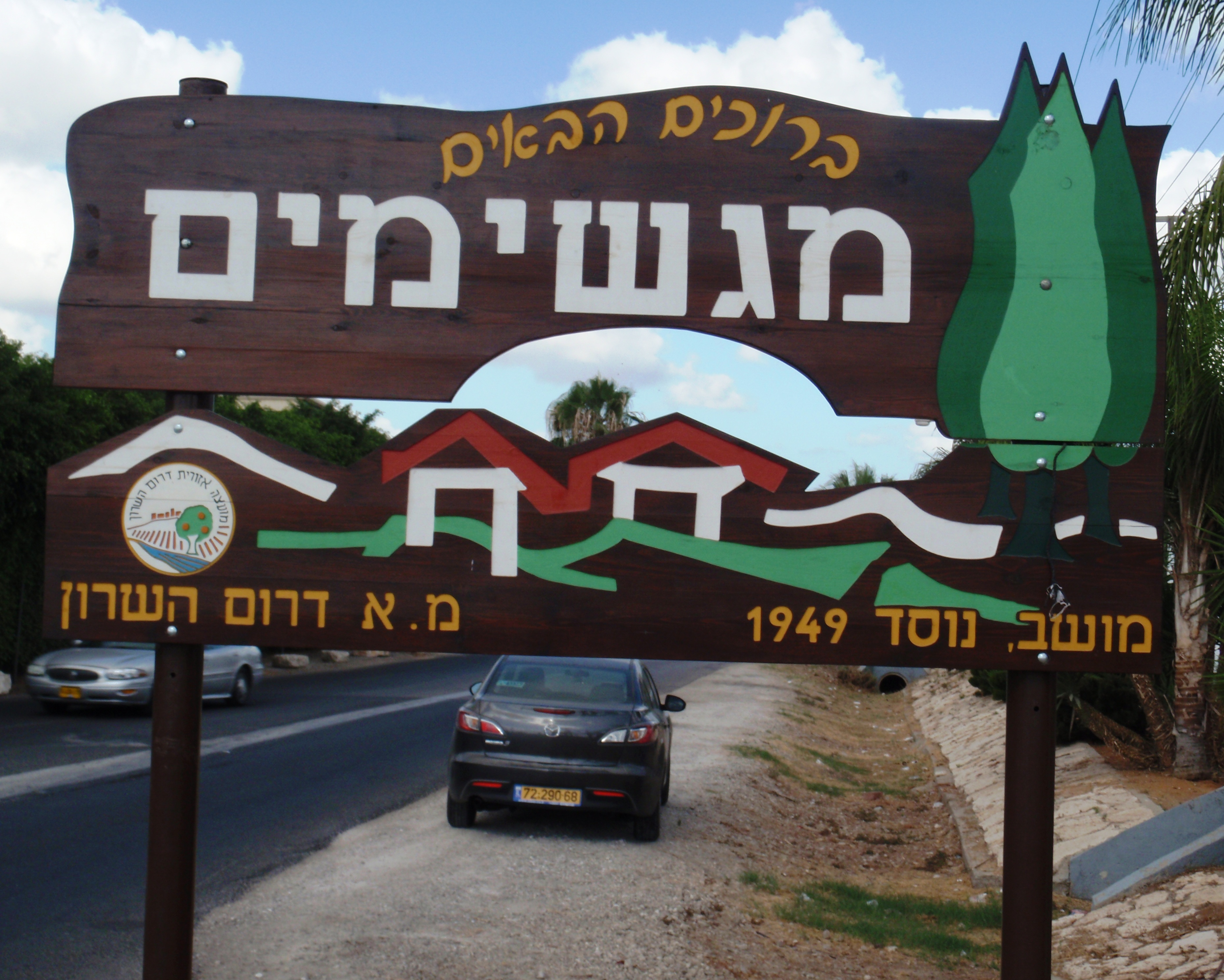

- Location within Central Israel
- Coordinates: 32°2′47″N 34°54′2″E
- Country: Israel
- District: Central
- Subdistrict: Petah Tikva
- Council: Drom HaSharon
- Affiliation: Agricultural Union
- Founded: 1949
- Founder: Demobbed IDF soldiers
- Population (2024): 915

Magshimim (Hebrew: מַגְשִׁימִים, lit. 'Dream fulfillers') is a moshav in central Israel. Located near Yehud, it falls under the jurisdiction of Drom HaSharon Regional Council. In 2024 it had a population of 915.

== History ==
During the 18th and 19th centuries, the area of Magshimim belonged to the Nahiyeh (sub-district) of Lod that encompassed the area of the present-day city of Modi'in-Maccabim-Re'ut in the south to the present-day city of El'ad in the north, and from the foothills in the east, through the Lod Valley to the outskirts of Jaffa in the west. This area was home to thousands of inhabitants in about 20 villages, who had at their disposal tens of thousands of hectares of prime agricultural land.

The moshav was founded in 1949 by demobilised IDF soldiers on land located near the Palestinian village of Al-'Abbasiyya, which was depopulated in the 1948 Arab–Israeli War. They were later joined by immigrants from Germany, Iraq and Poland.

== Economy ==
Amongst other things, the moshav's economy is built on flower exports and manufacturing printers.

== Notable residents ==
- Nili Drori (born 1960), Olympic foil fencer
- Ben Zhairi, footballer
- Liroy Zhairi, footballer
