= Gheorghe Covaciu =

Romanian handball player (born 1957)

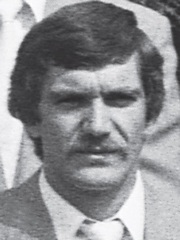
- Covaciu in the 1980s

Personal information
- Born: 8 July 1957 (age 68) Buzău, Romania
- Height: 188 cm (6 ft 2 in)
- Weight: 86 kg (190 lb)

Sport
- Sport: Handball
- Club: Dinamo Bucharest; HC Minaur Baia Mare; Benfica; Sporting CP; BM Ciudad Real
Medal record
Representing Romania
Olympic Games
Bronze medal – third place	1984 Los Angeles	Team

Gheorghe Covaciu (born 8 July 1957) is a Romanian former handball player who won a bronze medal at the 1984 Summer Olympics. At the club level he played for Dinamo Bucharest, HC Minaur Baia Mare, Benfica and Sporting CP as well as BM Ciudad Real in Spain, before finishing his career in Germany and becoming a coach.
