= Adrian Simion =

Romanian handball player (born 1961)

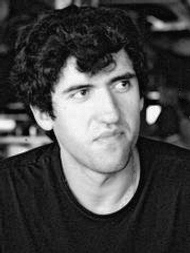

Personal information
- Born: 2 August 1961 (age 65) Bucharest, Romania
- Height: 194 cm (6 ft 4 in)
- Weight: 89 kg (196 lb)

Sport
- Sport: Handball
- Club: Steaua București
Medal record
Representing Romania
Olympic Games
Bronze medal – third place	1984 Los Angeles	Team

Adrian Simion (born 2 August 1961) is a former Romanian handball goalkeeper who won a bronze medal at the 1984 Summer Olympics. At the club level he played for CSA Steaua București, winning with them eight national titles and reaching the Champions Cup final in 1989. After retiring from competitions he worked as a mechanical engineer for the Ministry of Defence and as a handball coach for the national cadet team.

At the 1986 World Men's Handball Championship he was tested positive for Ephedrine, and was banned by IHF for two years.
