= Fencing at the 1983 Summer Universiade =

Fencing events were contested at the 1983 Summer Universiade in Edmonton, Alberta, Canada.

== Medal overview ==
=== Men's events ===
Event	Gold	Silver	Bronze
Individual Foil	Didier Lemenage (FRA)	Mauro Numa (ITA)	Andrea Borella (ITA)
Team Foil	Italy (ITA)	Soviet Union (URS)	Cuba (CUB)
Individual Épée	Stefano Bellone (ITA)	Miklós Bodoczi (ROU)	Vladamir Solokov (URS)
Team Épée	Italy (ITA)	Poland (POL)	Soviet Union (URS)
Individual Sabre	Marco Marin (ITA)	Giovanni Scalzo (ITA)	Gianfranco Dalla Barba (ITA)
Team Sabre	Soviet Union (URS)	Italy (ITA)	Hungary (HUN)

=== Women's events ===
Event	Gold	Silver	Bronze
Individual Foil	Elisabeta Guzganu-Tufan (ROU)	Rozalia Oros (ROU)	Madeleine Philion (CAN)
Team Foil	China (CHN)	Romania (ROU)	France (FRA)

== Medal table ==
Rank	Nation	Gold	Silver	Bronze	Total
1	Italy (ITA)	4	3	2	9
2	Romania (ROU)	1	3	0	4
3	Soviet Union (URS)	1	1	2	4
4	France (FRA)	1	0	1	2
5	China (CHN)	1	0	0	1
6	Poland (POL)	0	1	0	1
7	Canada (CAN)	0	0	1	1
7	Cuba (CUB)	0	0	1	1
7	Hungary (HUN)	0	0	1	1
Totals (9 entries)		8	8	8	24
