= Aurora Pleșca =

Romanian rower

Personal information
- Born: Aurora Darko; 2 September 1963 (age 62) Timișoara
- Height: 185 cm (73 in)
- Weight: 82 kg (181 lb)

Sport
- Sport: Rowing
Medal record
Women's rowing
Representing Romania
Olympic Games
Silver medal – second place	1984 Los Angeles	Eight
World Rowing Championships
Bronze medal – third place	1982 Lucerne	Coxed four

Aurora Pleșca (née Darko, born 2 September 1963 in Timișoara) is a Romanian rower.
