= Barbra Higgins =

Panamanian fencer

Barbra Higgins OLY
Personal information
- Citizenship: Panama; United States
- Born: 22 July 1957 (age 69)
- Education: Florida International University; University of Miami School of Law

Sport
- Country: Panama
- Sport: Fencing
- Handedness: Left

Barbra Higgins Arana (born 22 July 1957) is a Panamanian fencer. She competed in the women's individual foil event at the 1984 Summer Olympics.

Higgins became a U.S. citizen in or around 1973.

Higgins' mother was also an accomplished fencer. Higgins moved to the United States in 1976 to hone her skills in fencing against tougher competition than was available in Panama. By June 1979, she had graduated from Florida International University. In 1980, she was studying at the University of Miami School of Law while continuing to train as a fencer.

After law school, Higgins worked as a tax attorney and CPA and relocated to the Bay Area where she transitioned into sports marketing. Higgins was involved in San Francisco's bid for the 2012 Summer Olympics. She served on the board of the Bay Area Sports Hall of Fame.

Higgins is a lesbian and a Republican. She appeared on stage at the Xcel Energy Center with other Olympians to recite the Pledge of Allegiance during the 2008 Republican National Convention.
