= Annapia Gandolfi =

Italian fencer (born 1964)

Personal information
- Born: 29 June 1964 (age 62) Pisa, Italy

Sport
- Sport: Fencing
Medal record
Women's fencing
Representing Italy
Olympic Games
| Silver medal – second place | 1988 Seoul | Team foil |
World Championships
| Silver medal – second place | 1986 Sofia | Team foil |
| Bronze medal – third place | 1987 Lausanne | Team foil |
Summer Universiade
| Gold medal – first place | 1985 Kobe | Team foil |
| Gold medal – first place | 1987 Zagreb | Team foil |
| Silver medal – second place | 1987 Zagreb | Individual foil |

Annapia Gandolfi (born 29 June 1964) is an Italian fencer. She won a silver medal in the women's team foil event at the 1988 Summer Olympics.
