= Nathalie Pallet =

French fencer

Personal information
- Born: 25 May 1964 (age 62) Angoulême, France

Sport
- Sport: Fencing

Nathalie Pallet (born 25 May 1964) is a French fencer. She competed in the women's team foil event at the 1988 Summer Olympics.
