= Yun Jeong-suk =

South Korean fencer

Personal information
- Born: 11 July 1966 (age 60)

Sport
- Sport: Fencing

- Yun Jeong-suk
- Hangul: 윤정숙
- RR: Yun Jeongsuk
- MR: Yun Chŏngsuk

Yun Jeong-suk (born 11 July 1966) is a South Korean fencer. She competed in the women's team foil event at the 1988 Summer Olympics.
