= Vasile Oprea =

Romanian handball player (born 1957)

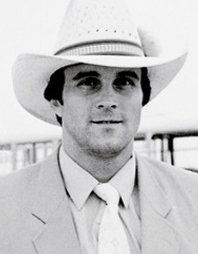

Personal information
- Born: 3 March 1957 (age 69) Bucharest, Romania
- Height: 183 cm (6 ft 0 in)
- Weight: 83 kg (183 lb)

Sport
- Sport: Handball
- Club: Dinamo București
Medal record
Representing Romania
Olympic Games
Bronze medal – third place	1984 Los Angeles	Team

Vasile Oprea (born 3 March 1957) is a retired Romanian handball player who won a bronze medal at the 1984 Summer Olympics. After retiring from competitions he became a coach, first in Romania, and since 1996 in Germany.
