= Alayna Snell =

United States Virgin Islands fencer

Personal information
- Born: 6 March 1961 (age 65)

Sport
- Sport: Fencing

Alayna Snell (born 6 March 1961) is a fencer from the United States Virgin Islands. She competed in the women's individual foil event at the 1984 Summer Olympics.
