= Choi Bok-ran =

South Korean fencer

Personal information
- Born: 15 December 1960 (age 65)

Sport
- Sport: Fencing

Choi Bok-ran (born 15 December 1960) is a South Korean fencer. She competed in the women's individual foil event at the 1984 Summer Olympics.
