= Keiko Mine =

Japanese fencer

Personal information
- Born: 5 November 1964 (age 61)

Sport
- Sport: Fencing

Keiko Mine (峯 啓子, Mine Keiko) (born 5 November 1964) is a Japanese fencer. She competed in the women's team foil event at the 1988 Summer Olympics.
