= Gina Faustin =

Haitian fencer

Personal information
- Born: 24 January 1960 (age 66)

Sport
- Sport: Fencing

Gina Faustin (born 24 January 1960) is a Haitian fencer. She competed in the women's individual foil event at the 1984 Summer Olympics.
