= Hanna Prusakowska =

Polish fencer

Personal information
- Born: 31 August 1962 (age 63) Gdańsk, Poland

Sport
- Sport: Fencing

Hanna Prusakowska (born 31 August 1962) is a Polish fencer. She competed in the women's team foil event at the 1988 Summer Olympics.
