= Katalin Tuschák =

Hungarian fencer (born 1959)

Personal information
- Born: 13 June 1959 (age 67) Budapest, Hungary

Sport
- Sport: Fencing
Medal record
Women's fencing
Representing Hungary
Olympic Games
Bronze medal – third place	1988 Seoul	Foil Team

Katalin Tuschák (born 13 June 1959) is a Hungarian fencer, who won a bronze medal in the team foil competition at the 1988 Summer Olympics in Seoul together with Zsuzsanna Szőcs, Zsuzsanna Jánosi, Edit Kovács and Gertrúd Stefanek.
