= Annette Klug =

German fencer

Personal information
- Born: 24 January 1969 (age 57) Singen, West Germany
- Height: 1.70 m (5 ft 7 in)
- Weight: 68 kg (150 lb)

Sport
- Sport: Fencing
- Club: FC Tauberbischofsheim
Medal record
Representing West Germany
Olympic Games
Gold medal – first place	1988 Seoul	Team foil

Annette Klug (born 24 January 1969) is a German fencer. She won a gold medal in the women's team foil event at the 1988 Summer Olympics.
