= Susan Badders =

American fencer

Personal information
- Born: September 16, 1951 (age 74) Queens, New York, United States

Sport
- Sport: Fencing
- College team: Cal State University at Fullerton; member of the NIWFA championship team 1974; All-American 1st team

Susan Badders (born September 16, 1951) is an American former fencer. She competed in the women's team foil event at the 1984 Summer Olympics.
