= Caroline Mitchell =

Canadian fencer

Personal information
- Born: 28 June 1958 (age 68) Quebec City, Quebec, Canada

Sport
- Sport: Fencing

Caroline Mitchell (born 28 June 1958) is a Canadian fencer. She competed in the women's individual and team foil events at the 1984 Summer Olympics.
