= Zita-Eva Funkenhauser =

German fencer (born 1966)

Personal information
- Born: 1 July 1966 (age 59) Satu Mare, Romania
- Height: 1.80 m (5 ft 11 in)
- Weight: 63 kg (139 lb)

Sport
- Sport: Fencing
- Club: FC Tauberbischofsheim
Medal record
Representing West Germany
Olympic Games
| Gold medal – first place | 1984 Los Angeles | Foil, team |
| Gold medal – first place | 1988 Seoul | Foil, team |
| Bronze medal – third place | 1988 Seoul | Foil, individual |
Representing Germany
| Silver medal – second place | 1992 Barcelona | Foil, team |

Zita-Eva Funkenhauser (born 1 July 1966) is a retired, Romanian-born German foil fencer. In 1984 and 1988 she won two team gold and bronze medal at the Olympics competing for West Germany and a silver competing for Germany.

Funkenhauser is married to Matthias Behr, a 1976 Olympic champion in the foil. Her family belongs to the magyars (father: László mother: Éva) and the Satu Mare Swabians.
