= Sheila Viard =

Haitian fencer

Personal information
- Born: 3 January 1960 (age 66)

Sport
- Country: Haiti
- Sport: Fencing
- Event: 1984 Summer Olympics

Sheila Viard (born 3 January 1960) is a Haitian fencer. She competed in the women's individual foil event at the 1984 Summer Olympics.
