= Ute Kircheis-Wessel =

German fencer (born 1953)

Personal information
- Born: 18 May 1953 (age 73) North Rhine-Westphalia, West Germany
- Height: 1.70 m (5 ft 7 in)
- Weight: 60 kg (132 lb)

Sport
- Sport: Fencing
Medal record
Representing West Germany
Olympic Games
| Gold medal – first place | 1984 Los Angeles | Foil, team |
World Fencing Championships
| Silver medal – second place | 1977 Buenos Aires | Team foil |
| Silver medal – second place | 1981 Clermont-Ferrand | Team foil |
| Silver medal – second place | 1983 Vienna | Team foil |
| Bronze medal – third place | 1979 Melbourne | Team foil |

Ute Kircheis-Wessel (born Ute Kircheis on 18 May 1953) is a retired German fencer. She won a gold medal in the women's team foil at the 1984 Summer Olympics. At the 1976 Summer Olympics she finished in 32nd and fourth place in the individual and team foil events, respectively. She won four medals at world championships in the team foil between 1977 and 1983. Her brother-in-law Friedrich Wessel is also an Olympic foil fencer.
