= Oh Seung-soon =

South Korean fencer

Personal information
- Born: 11 July 1963 (age 62)

Sport
- Sport: Fencing

Oh Seung-soon (born 11 July 1963) is a South Korean fencer. She competed in the women's individual foil event at the 1984 Summer Olympics.
