= Azusa Oikawa =

Japanese fencer

Personal information
- Born: 26 June 1960 (age 66)

Sport
- Sport: Fencing

Azusa Oikawa (及川 あずさ, Oikawa Azusa) (born 26 June 1960) is a Japanese fencer. She competed in the women's individual and team foil events at the 1984 Summer Olympics.
