= Carola Cicconetti =

Italian fencer (born 1962)

Personal information
- Born: 3 January 1962 (age 64) Rome, Italy

Sport
- Sport: Fencing
Medal record
Mediterranean Games
Silver medal – second place	1983 Casablanca	Individual foil

Carola Cicconetti (born 3 January 1962) is an Italian former fencer. She competed in the women's individual and team foil events at the 1984 Summer Olympics. She won a silver medal in the individual foil event at the 1983 Mediterranean Games.
