= Lucia Traversa =

Italian fencer (born 1965)

Personal information
- Born: 31 May 1965 (age 61) Rome, Italy

Sport
- Sport: Fencing
Medal record
Women's fencing
Representing Italy
Olympic Games
| Silver medal – second place | 1988 Seoul | Team foil |
World Championships
| Gold medal – first place | 1986 Sofia | Team foil |
| Silver medal – second place | 1990 Lyon | Team foil |
Summer Universiade
| Gold medal – first place | 1985 Kobe | Team foil |
| Gold medal – first place | 1987 Zagreb | Individual foil |
| Gold medal – first place | 1987 Zagreb | Team foil |
| Gold medal – first place | 1989 Duisburg | Team foil |
| Gold medal – first place | 1991 Sheffield | Team foil |

Lucia Traversa (born 31 May 1965) is an Italian former fencer. She won a silver medal in the women's team foil event at the 1988 Summer Olympics.
