= Li Huahua =

Chinese fencer (born 1962)

Personal information
- Born: 李 华华, Pinyin: Lǐ Huá-huá; 29 October 1962 (age 63)

Sport
- Sport: Fencing

Li Huahua (born 29 October 1962) is a Chinese fencer. She competed at the 1984 and 1988 Summer Olympics. After retirement from competitions, Li moved to Canada and started a fencing club in Richmond Hill, Ontario in 2011.
