= Linda Ann Martin =

British fencer (born 1954)

Personal information
- Born: 12 June 1954 (age 72) Deal, Kent, England

Sport
- Sport: Fencing

Linda Ann Martin (born 12 June 1954) is a British fencer. She competed in the women's individual and team foil events at the 1980, 1984 and 1988 Summer Olympics.
