= Vincent Bradford =

American fencer

Personal information
- Born: March 3, 1955 (age 71) Germany

Sport
- Sport: Fencing

Vincent Bradford (born March 3, 1955) is an American former fencer. She competed in the women's individual and team foil events at the 1984 Summer Olympics.
