= Miyuki Maekawa =

Japanese fencer

Personal information
- Native name: 前川 みゆき
- Born: 2 July 1956 (age 70)

Sport
- Sport: Fencing

Miyuki Maekawa (前川 みゆき, Maekawa Miyuki) (born 2 July 1956) is a Japanese former fencer. She competed in the women's individual and team foil events at the 1984 Summer Olympics.
