= Edit Kovács (fencer) =

Hungarian fencer (born 1954)

Personal information
- Born: 9 June 1954 (age 72) Veszprém, Hungary

Sport
- Sport: Fencing
Medal record
Women's fencing
Representing Hungary
Olympic Games
Bronze medal – third place	1976 Montreal	Foil Team
Bronze medal – third place	1980 Moscow	Foil Team
Bronze medal – third place	1988 Seoul	Foil Team

Edit Kovács (born 9 June 1954, Veszprém) is a Hungarian fencer, who won three Olympic medals in the foil team competitions. She graduated from the Physical Education College in 1986. She became the senior inspector of the Hungarian Fencing Association, then she was secretary general between 1991 and 2001.
