= Sabine Bischoff =

German fencer (1958–2013)

Personal information
- Born: 21 May 1958 Koblenz, West Germany
- Died: 6 March 2013 (aged 54) Weikersheim, Germany
- Height: 1.69 m (5 ft 7 in)
- Weight: 64 kg (141 lb)

Sport
- Sport: Fencing
- Club: FC Tauberbischofsheim
Medal record
Representing West Germany
Olympic Games
Gold medal – first place	1984 Los Angeles	Foil, team
World Fencing Championships
Gold medal – first place	Barcelona 1985	Team foil
Silver medal – second place	Clermont-Ferrand 1981	Team foil
Silver medal – second place	Vienna 1983	Team foil
Silver medal – second place	Barcelona 1985	Individual foil
Bronze medal – third place	Melbourne 1979	Team foil
Bronze medal – third place	Roma 1982	Team foil
Bronze medal – third place	Sofia 1986	Team foil

Sabine Bischoff (21 May 1958 – 6 March 2013) was a German fencer.

== Biography ==
Sabine Bischoff fought for the Fencing-Club Tauberbischofsheim. She won a gold medal in the team foil at the 1984 Summer Olympics, which was the first German Olympic gold medal in this event. Between 1979 and 1986 Bischoff won six medals at world championships in the same team foil event, including a gold in 1985; she lost the individual foil final in 1985 to her teammate Cornelia Hanisch.

Bischoff had degrees in psychology, history and social sciences, and worked as a high school teacher after retiring from competitions. She died after a long, chronic disease. Her brother Stefan also competed in foil, but at a national level.
