= Sandra Giancola =

Argentine fencer (born 1965)

Personal information
- Born: 4 July 1965 (age 60)

Sport
- Sport: Fencing
Medal record
Representing Argentina
Pan American Games
Silver medal – second place	1991 Havana	Individual foil
Bronze medal – third place	1983 Caracas	Team foil
Bronze medal – third place	1991 Havana	Individual épée
Bronze medal – third place	1995 Mar del Plata	Team foil

Sandra Marina Giancola Heinlein (born 4 July 1965) is an Argentine fencer. She competed in the women's individual and team foil events at the 1984 Summer Olympics and the individual foil at the 1992 Summer Olympics. She is the sister of Silvana Giancola, who also fenced at the Olympics for Argentina.
