= Debra Waples =

American fencer

Personal information
- Full name: Debra Lynn Waples
- Born: June 30, 1953 (age 72) Cincinnati, Ohio, United States

Sport
- Sport: Fencing

Debra Lynn Waples (born June 30, 1953) is an American former foil fencer. She was the captain of the USA fencing team and competed in the women's individual and team foil events at the 1984 Summer Olympics.

Debra's daughter is NBC News video journalist Camille Behnke.
