= Christiane Weber (fencer) =

German fencer

Personal information
- Born: 17 March 1962 (age 64) Dillingen, West Germany
- Height: 1.74 m (5 ft 9 in)
- Weight: 57 kg (126 lb)

Sport
- Sport: Fencing
- Club: FC Offenbach
Medal record
Representing West Germany
Olympic Games
Gold medal – first place	1984 Los Angeles	Team foil
Gold medal – first place	1988 Seoul	Team foil

Christiane Weber (born 17 March 1962) is a German fencer. She won gold medals in the team foil events at the 1984 and 1988 Summer Olympics. Weber is married to Achim Bellmann, who competed in the modern pentathlon at the 1984 Games.
