= Jana Angelakis =

American fencer

Personal information
- Born: January 1, 1962 (age 63); Lynn, Massachusetts, United States

Sport
- Sport: Fencing

Jana Marie Angelakis (born January 1, 1962) is an American former fencer. Angelakis qualified for the 1980 U.S. Olympic team but did not compete due to the U.S. Olympic Committee's boycott of the 1980 Summer Olympics in Moscow, Russia. She was one of 461 athletes to receive a Congressional Gold Medal instead. She did compete in the women's individual and team foil events at the 1984 Summer Olympics.

== See also ==
- List of Pennsylvania State University Olympians
- List of USFA Hall of Fame members
