= Cornelia Hanisch =

German fencer (born 1952)

Personal information
- Born: 12 June 1952 (age 74) Frankfurt, West Germany
- Height: 1.63 m (5 ft 4 in)
- Weight: 54 kg (119 lb)

Sport
- Sport: Fencing
- Club: FC Offenbach
Medal record
Women's fencing
Representing West Germany
Olympic Games
Gold medal – first place	1984 Los Angeles	Team foil
Silver medal – second place	1984 Los Angeles	Individual foil
World Fencing Championships
Gold medal – first place	1979 Melbourne	Individual foil
Gold medal – first place	1981 Clermont-Ferrand	Individual foil
Gold medal – first place	1985 Barcelona	Individual foil
Gold medal – first place	1985 Barcelona	Team foil
Silver medal – second place	1977 Buenos Aires	Team foil
Silver medal – second place	1981 Clermont-Ferrand	Team foil
Silver medal – second place	1983 Vienna	Team foil
Bronze medal – third place	1978 Hamburg	Individual foil
Bronze medal – third place	1979 Melbourne	Team foil
Bronze medal – third place	1982 Rome	Team foil
Summer Universiade
Silver medal – second place	1977 Sofia	Individual foil
Silver medal – second place	1979 Mexico City	Individual foil
Bronze medal – third place	1979 Mexico City	Team foil

Cornelia Hanisch (German pronunciation: [kɔʁˈneːli̯a ˈhaːnɪʃ]; born 12 June 1952) is a retired German fencer. She won a gold medal in the team foil and a silver in the individual foil at the 1984 Summer Olympics. Between 1977 and 1985, she won ten medals in the foil at world championships, including four gold medals.

In 1980, she received Silbernes Lorbeerblatt.
