= Anne Meygret =

French fencer (born 1965)

Personal information
- Born: 15 February 1965 (age 61) Nice, France

Sport
- Sport: Fencing
Medal record
Women's fencing
Representing France
Olympic Games
Bronze medal – third place	1984 Los Angeles	Foil, team

Anne Meygret (born 15 February 1965) is a French fencer. She won a bronze medal in the women's team foil at the 1984 Summer Olympics.
