= María Alicia Sinigaglia =

Argentine fencer (born 1964)

Personal information
- Born: 25 February 1964 (age 62)

Sport
- Sport: Fencing

María Alicia Sinigaglia (born 25 February 1964) is an Argentine fencer. She competed in the women's individual and team foil events at the 1984 Summer Olympics.
