= Jacynthe Poirier =

Canadian fencer (born 1962)

Personal information
- Born: 4 July 1962 (age 63) Murdochville, Quebec, Canada

Sport
- Sport: Fencing

Jacynthe Poirier (born 4 July 1962) is a Canadian fencer. She competed in the women's individual and team foil events at the 1984 and 1988 Summer Olympics.
