= Véronique Brouquier =

French fencer (born 1957)

Personal information
- Born: 28 May 1957 (age 69) Paris, France

Sport
- Sport: Fencing
Medal record
Women's fencing
Representing France
Olympic Games
Gold medal – first place	1980 Moscow	Foil, team
Bronze medal – third place	1984 Los Angeles	Foil, team

Véronique Brouquier (born 28 May 1957) is a French fencer. She won a gold medal in the women's team foil at the 1980 Summer Olympics and a bronze in the same event at the 1984 Summer Olympics.
