= Aurora Dan =

Romanian fencer (born 1955)

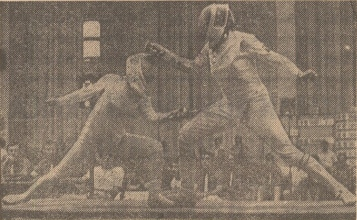
- fencing Ana Dimitrenko (U.R.S.S.) 1981

Personal information
- Born: 5 October 1955 (age 70) Bucharest, Romania

Sport
- Sport: Fencing
Medal record
Women's fencing
Representing Romania
Olympic Games
Silver medal – second place	1984 Los Angeles	Team foil
World Championships
Bronze medal – third place	1977 Buenos Aires	Team foil
Summer Universiade
Gold medal – first place	1981 Bucharest	Team foil
Silver medal – second place	1981 Bucharest	Individual foil
Silver medal – second place	1983 Edmonton	Team foil

Aurora Dan (born 5 October 1955) is a Romanian fencer. She won a silver medal in the women's team foil event at the 1984 Summer Olympics.
