= Laurence Modaine-Cessac =

French fencer (born 1964)

Personal information
- Born: 28 December 1964 (age 61) Douai, France

Sport
- Sport: Fencing
Medal record
Women's fencing
Representing France
Olympic Games
| Bronze medal – third place | 1984 Los Angeles | Foil, team |

Laurence Modaine-Cessac (born 28 December 1964) is a French fencer. She won a bronze medal in the women's team foil at the 1984 Summer Olympics.
