= Rozalia Husti =

Romanian fencer

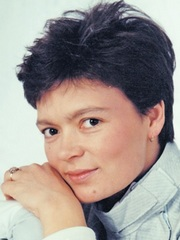

Personal information
- Born: Rozália Orosz; 28 January 1964 (age 62) Satu Mare, Romania
- Height: 168 cm (5 ft 6 in)
- Weight: 55 kg (121 lb)

Sport
- Sport: Fencing
- Event: Foil
Medal record
Representing Romania
Olympic Games
Silver medal – second place	1984 Los Angeles	Team foil
World Fencing Championships
Silver medal – second place	1987 Lausanne	Team foil
Summer Universiade
Silver medal – second place	1983 Edmonton	Individual foil
Silver medal – second place	1983 Edmonton	Team foil
Representing Germany
World Fencing Championships
Bronze medal – third place	1991 Budapest	Team foil

Rozalia Husti (Hungarian: Rozália Orosz, born 28 January 1964) is a retired Romanian-German foil fencer. Competing for Romania she won team silver medals at the 1984 Olympics and 1987 World Championships. In 1990 she moved to Germany, where she worked as a fencing coach at FC Tauberbischofsheim. She continued competing and won team bronze medals at the 1991 world and 1992 European championships.
