= Silvana Giancola =

Argentine fencer (born 1962)

Personal information
- Born: 24 February 1962 (age 64)

Sport
- Sport: Fencing
Medal record
Representing Argentina
Pan American Games
Bronze medal – third place	1983 Caracas	Team foil

Silvana Inés Giancola Heinlein (born 24 February 1962) is an Argentine fencer. She competed in the women's individual and team foil events at the 1984 Summer Olympics. She is the sister of Sandra Giancola, who also fenced at the Olympics for Argentina.
