= Brigitte Latrille-Gaudin =

French fencer (born 1958)

Personal information
- Born: 15 April 1958 (age 68) Bordeaux, France

Sport
- Sport: Fencing
Medal record
Women's fencing
Representing France
Olympic Games
Gold medal – first place	1980 Moscow	Foil, team
Silver medal – second place	1976 Montreal	Foil, team
Bronze medal – third place	1984 Los Angeles	Foil, team
Mediterranean Games
Gold medal – first place	1979 Split	Individual foil

Brigitte Latrille-Gaudin (born 15 April 1958) is a French fencer. She won a gold, silver and bronze medal in the women's team foil events at three different Olympic Games. She also won a gold medal in the individual foil event at the 1979 Mediterranean Games.
