= Mieko Miyahara =

Japanese fencer (born 1960)

Personal information
- Born: 8 January 1960 (age 66)

Sport
- Sport: Fencing

Mieko Miyahara (宮原 美江子, Miyahara Mieko) (born 8 January 1960) is a Japanese fencer. She competed in the women's individual and team foil events at the 1984 and 1988 Summer Olympics.
