= Elisabeta Guzganu-Tufan =

Romanian fencer (born 1964)

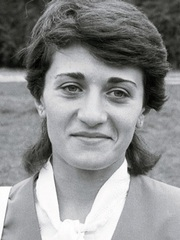

Personal information
- Born: 8 August 1964 (age 62) Bucharest, Romania
- Height: 160 cm (5 ft 3 in)
- Weight: 54 kg (119 lb)

Sport
- Sport: Fencing
- Event: Foil
- Club: CSA Steaua București
- Coached by: Maria Teodoru, Olgai Szabo (club); Stefan Haukler, Tudor Petrus (national)
Medal record
Representing Romania
Olympic Games
Silver medal – second place	1984 Los Angeles	Team foil
Bronze medal – third place	1992 Barcelona	Team foil
World Fencing Championships
Gold medal – first place	1987 Lausanne	Individual foil
Gold medal – first place	1994 Athens	Team foil
Silver medal – second place	1987 Lausanne	Team foil
Silver medal – second place	1993 Essen	Team foil
Silver medal – second place	1995 The Hague	Team foil
Summer Universiade
Gold medal – first place	1981 Bucharest	Team foil
Gold medal – first place	1983 Edmonton	Individual foil
Silver medal – second place	1983 Edmonton	Team foil

Elisabeta Guzganu-Tufan (née Tufan, born 8 August 1964) is a retired Romanian foil fencer. She competed at the 1984, 1988 and 1992 Olympics and won a silver and a bronze team medal in 1984 and 1992, respectively. Her best individual result was fourth place in 1984. She won the individual world title in 1987 and team silver medals in 1987, 1993 and 1995. After retiring from competitions she worked as a fencing coach in Milan, Italy.
