= Monika Weber-Koszto =

Romanian fencer (born 1966)

Personal information
- Born: 7 February 1966 (age 60) Satu Mare, Romania

Sport
- Sport: Fencing
Medal record
Women's fencing
Representing Romania
Olympic Games
Silver medal – second place	1984 Los Angeles	Foil, team
Representing Germany
Olympic Games
Silver medal – second place	1992 Barcelona	Foil, team
Bronze medal – third place	1996 Atlanta	Foil, team
Bronze medal – third place	2000 Sydney	Foil, team

Monika Weber-Koszto (Hungarian: Weber-Kosztó Mónika; born 7 February 1966) is a Romanian-born German fencer. She won a silver medal in the women's team foil event at the 1984 Summer Olympics competing for Romania. She then won a silver in the same event at the 1992 Summer Olympics competing for Germany. She went on to win two more bronze medals in the same event for Germany at the 1996 and 2000 Summer Olympics.
