= Marcela Moldovan-Zsak =

Romanian fencer (born 1956)

Personal information
- Born: 3 June 1956 (age 70) Satu Mare, Romania

Sport
- Sport: Fencing
Medal record
Women's fencing
Representing Romania
Olympic Games
Silver medal – second place	1984 Los Angeles	Foil, team

Marcela Moldovan-Zsak (born 3 June 1956) is a Romanian fencer. She won a silver medal in the women's team foil event at the 1984 Summer Olympics.
