= South Korea at the 1988 Summer Olympics =

- IOC code: KOR
- NOC: Korean Olympic Committee

in Seoul
- Competitors: 401 (269 men and 132 women) in 27 sports
- Flag bearer: Cho Yong-chul
- Medals Ranked 4th: Gold 12 Silver 10 Bronze 11 Total 33

Summer Olympics appearances (overview)
- 1948; 1952; 1956; 1960; 1964; 1968; 1972; 1976; 1980; 1984; 1988; 1992; 1996; 2000; 2004; 2008; 2012; 2016; 2020; 2024

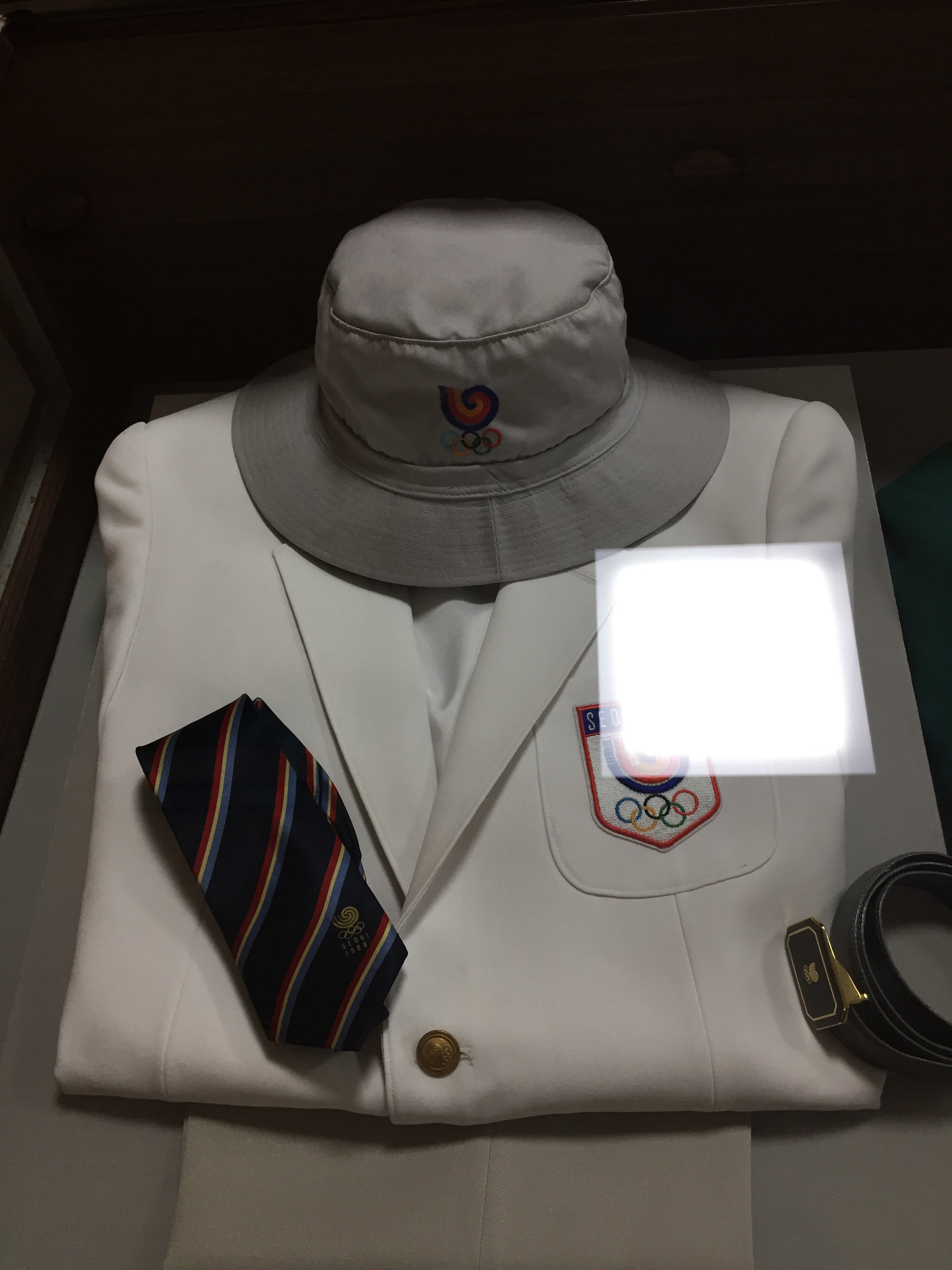
Korean national team uniforms at the opening ceremony of the games

South Korea was the host nation and competed as Korea at the 1988 Summer Olympics in Seoul. 401 competitors, 269 men and 132 women, took part in 218 events in 27 sports.

== Medalists ==
Medal	Name	Sport	Event	Date
Gold	Kim Young-nam	Wrestling	Men's Greco-Roman 74 kg	21 September
Gold	Kim Jae-yup	Judo	Men's 60 kg	25 September
Gold	Lee Kyung-keun	Judo	Men's 65 kg	26 September
Gold	South Korea women's national handball team: Han Hyun-sook; Ki Mi-sook; Kim Choon-rye; Kim Hyun-mee; Kim Kyung-soon; Kim Myung-soon; Lee Mi-young; Lee Ki-soon; Lim Mi-kyung; Son Mi-na; Song Ji-hyun; Suk Min-hee; Sung Kyung-hwa	Handball	Women's tournament	29 September
Gold	Kim Soo-nyung	Archery	Women's individual	30 September
Gold	Hyun Jung-hwa; Yang Young-ja	Table tennis	Women's doubles	30 September
Gold	Chun In-soo; Lee Han-sup; Park Sung-soo	Archery	Men's team	1 October
Gold	Kim Soo-nyung; Wang Hee-kyung; Yun Young-sook	Archery	Women's team	1 October
Gold	Yoo Nam-kyu	Table tennis	Men's singles	1 October
Gold	Han Myung-woo	Wrestling	Men's freestyle 82 kg	1 October
Gold	Kim Kwang-sun	Boxing	Flyweight	2 October
Gold	Park Si-hun	Boxing	Light middleweight	2 October
Silver	Chun Byung-kwan	Weightlifting	Men's 52 kg	18 September
Silver	Cha Young-chul	Shooting	Men's 50 metre rifle prone	19 September
Silver	Kim Sung-moon	Wrestling	Men's Greco-Roman 68 kg	22 September
Silver	Park Sung-soo	Archery	Men's individual	30 September
Silver	Wang Hee-kyung	Archery	Women's individual	30 September
Silver	South Korea women's national field hockey team: Chang Eun-jung; Cho Ki-hyang; Choi Choon-ok; Chung Eun-kyung; Chung Sang-hyun; Han Gum-shil; Han Ok-kyung; Hwang Keum-sook; Jin Won-sim; Kim Mi-sun; Kim Soon-duk; Kim Young-sook; Lim Kye-sook; Park Soon-ja; Seo Hyo-sun; Seo Kwang-mi	Field hockey	Women's tournament	30 September
Silver	Baik Hyun-man	Boxing	Heavyweight	1 October
Silver	South Korea men's national handball team: Choi Suk-jae; Kang Jae-won; Kim Jae-hwan; Koh Suk-chang; Lee Sang-hyo; Lim Jin-suk; Noh Hyun-suk; Oh Young-ki; Park Do-hun; Park Young-dae; Shim Jae-hong; Shin Young-suk; Yoon Tae-il	Handball	Men's tournament	1 October
Silver	Kim Ki-taik	Table tennis	Men's singles	1 October
Silver	Park Jang-soon	Wrestling	Men's freestyle 68 kg	1 October
Bronze	An Dae-hyun	Wrestling	Men's Greco-Roman 62 kg	20 September
Bronze	Lee Jae-suk	Wrestling	Men's Greco-Roman 52 kg	21 September
Bronze	Kim Sang-kyu	Wrestling	Men's Greco-Roman 82 kg	22 September
Bronze	Park Jong-hoon	Gymnastics	Men's vault	24 September
Bronze	Lee Hyeong-geun	Weightlifting	Men's 82.5 kg	24 September
Bronze	Lee Jae-hyuk	Boxing	Featherweight	29 September
Bronze	Yun Young-sook	Archery	Women's individual	30 September
Bronze	Ahn Jae-hyung; Yoo Nam-kyu	Table tennis	Men's doubles	30 September
Bronze	Kim Tae-woo	Wrestling	Men's freestyle 90 kg	1 October
Bronze	Cho Yong-chul	Judo	Men's +95 kg	1 October
Bronze	Noh Kyung-sun	Wrestling	Men's freestyle 57 kg	1 October

== Competitors ==
The following is the list of number of competitors in the Games.

Sport	Men	Women	Total
Archery	3	3	6
Athletics	27	20	47
Basketball	12	12	24
Boxing	12	–	12
Canoeing	11	4	15
Cycling	11	4	15
Diving	1	1	2
Equestrian	9	1	10
Fencing	15	5	20
Field hockey	16	16	32
Football	16	–	16
Gymnastics	3	8	11
Handball	13	12	25
Judo	7	–	7
Modern pentathlon	3	–	3
Rowing	19	9	28
Sailing	8	2	10
Shooting	14	8	22
Swimming	8	7	15
Synchronized swimming	–	3	3
Table tennis	4	3	7
Tennis	3	2	5
Volleyball	12	12	24
Water polo	13	–	13
Weightlifting	10	–	10
Wrestling	19	–	19
Total	269	132	401

== Archery ==
Korea's third appearance in Olympic archery was even more successful than its previous one. The women's team was flawless, winning all three of the individual medals and the team gold. The men also won the team gold, with Park Sung-soo adding a fourth individual medal to bring the Koreans' total to six.

Women's Individual Competition:

- Kim Soo-nyung — Final (→ Gold Medal)
- Wang Hee-kyung — Final (→ Silver Medal)
- Yun Young-sook — Final (→ Bronze Medal)

Men's Individual Competition:

- Park Sung-soo — Final (→ Silver Medal)
- Chun In-soo — Final (→ 4th place)
- Lee Han-sup — Semifinal (→ 10th place)

Women's Team Competition:

- Kim, Wang, and Yun — Final → ( Gold Medal)

Men's Team Competition:

- Park, Chun, and Lee — Final → ( Gold Medal)

== Athletics ==
Men's 10,000 metres

- Lee Sang-keun

- Heat — 29:37.14 (→ did not advance)

Men's Marathon

- Kim Won-tak

- Final — 2:15.44 (→ 18th place)

- Yoo Jae-sung

- Final — 2:20.11 (→ 31st place)

- Gwon Seong-nak

- Final — DNF

Men's 4 × 100 m Relay

- Sung Nak-kun, Shim Duk-sup, Kim Bock-sup, and Jang Jae-keun

- Heat — 39.61
- Semi Final — 39.43 (→ did not advance)

Men's 4 × 400 m Relay

- Hwang Hong-chul, Yoon Nam-han, Ryu Tae-keong, and Cho Jin-saeng

- Heat — 3:14.71 (→ did not advance)

Men's 3.000 m Steeplechase

- Cha Han-sik

- Heat — 8:59.82 (→ did not advance)

Men's Long Jump

- Kim Jong-il

- Qualification – 7.70m (→ did not advance)

Men's Hammer Throw

- Lee Joo-hyong

- Qualifying Heat — 55.98m (→ did not advance)

Men's Shot Put

- Han Min-soo

- Qualifying heat – 15.68m (→ did not advance)

Men's Discus Throw

- Min Se-hoon

- Qualifying heat – 47.84m (→ did not advance)

Men's Javelin Throw

- Lee Wook-jong

- Qualification — 78.10m (→ did not advance)

Men's Decathlon

- Lee Kwang-ik — 6917 points (→ 33rd place)

1. 100 metres — 11.57s
2. Long Jump — 7.19m
3. Shot Put — 10.27m
4. High Jump — 1.91m
5. 400 metres — 50.71s
6. 110m Hurdles — 16.20s
7. Discus Throw — 34.36m
8. Pole Vault — 4.10m
9. Javelin Throw — 54.94m
10. 1.500 metres — 4:29.98s

Men's 20 km Walk

- Chung Pil-hwa

- Final — 1:32:23 (→ 46th place)

- Jung Myong-oh

- Final — 1:40:09 (→ 49th place)

Women's 4 × 100 m Relay

- Yoon Mi-kyong, Woo Yang-ja, Park Mi-seon, and Lee Young-sook

- Heat — 45.83 (→ did not advance)

Women's 4 × 400 m Relay

- Yang Kyoung-hee, Choi Se-beom, Lim Chun-ae, and Kim Soon-ja

- Heat — 3:51.09 (→ did not advance)

Women's Marathon

- Lee Mi-ok

- Final — 2:32.51 (→ 15th place)

- Lim Eun-joo

- Final — 2:38.21 (→ 37th place)

- Kim Mi-gyeong

- Final — did not start (→ no ranking)

Women's Discus Throw

- Kim Chun-hee

- Qualification – 45.88m (→ did not advance)

Women's Javelin Throw

- Yoo Chun-ok

- Qualification – 48.26m (→ did not advance)

Women's Shot Put

- Choi Mi-seon

- Qualification — 13.97m (→ did not advance)

Women's Heptathlon

- Ji Jeong-mi

- Final Result — 5289 points (→ 24th place)

== Basketball ==
=== Men's tournament ===
Team roster

The following is the South Korea roster in the men's basketball tournament of the 1988 Summer Olympics.

South Korea men's national basketball team – 1988 Summer Olympics roster
Players
Coaches

Pos.	No.	Name	Age – Date of birth	Height	Club	Ctr.
SG	4	Lee Won-woo	30 – 19 August 1958	1.88 m (6 ft 2 in)
	5	Choi Chul-kwon	25 – 19 July 1963	1.79 m (5 ft 10 in)
SG	6	Lee Chung-hee	28 – 7 November 1959	1.82 m (6 ft 0 in)
	7	Oh Seh-wong	27 – 20 June 1961	1.88 m (6 ft 2 in)
	8	Yoo Jae-hak	25 – 20 March 1963	1.80 m (5 ft 11 in)
	9	Lee Moon-kyu	32 – 4 August 1956	1.90 m (6 ft 3 in)
	10	Kim Hyun-jun	28 – 3 June 1960	1.82 m (6 ft 0 in)
	11	Hur Jae	22 – 28 September 1965	1.88 m (6 ft 2 in)
	12	Kim Yoon-ho	25 – 21 March 1963	1.92 m (6 ft 4 in)
	13	Park Jong-chun	28 – 13 May 1960	1.94 m (6 ft 4 in)
C	14	Kim Yoo-taek	24 – 10 October 1963	1.97 m (6 ft 6 in)
	15	Han Ki-bum	24 – 7 June 1964	2.07 m (6 ft 9 in)

Legend

- Club – describes last
  club before the tournament
- Age – describes age
  on 17 September 1988

Group play

Pos	Team	Pld	W	L	PF	PA	PD	Pts	Qualification
1	Yugoslavia	5	4	1	468	384	+84	9 (Note: Head-to-head record: Yugoslavia 1–0 Soviet Union)	Quarterfinals
2	Soviet Union	5	4	1	460	393	+67	9	Quarterfinals
3	Australia	5	3	2	429	408	+21	8 (Note: Head-to-head record: Australia 1–0 Puerto Rico)	Quarterfinals
4	Puerto Rico	5	3	2	382	387	−5	8	Quarterfinals
5	Central African Republic	5	1	4	346	436	−90	6	9th–12th classification round
6	South Korea (H)	5	0	5	384	461	−77	5	9th–12th classification round

Source: FIBA archive
Rules for classification: 1) points; 2) head-to-head points; 3) head-to-head goal average; 4) head-to-head number of points scored.
(H) Hosts
Notes:

18 September 1988

Central African Republic	73–70	South Korea
Scoring by half: 47–30, 26–40

Jamsil Gymnasium, Seoul

20 September 1988

South Korea	74–79	Puerto Rico
Scoring by half: 30–38, 44–41

Jamsil Gymnasium, Seoul

21 September 1988

South Korea	92–104	Yugoslavia
Scoring by half: 46–48, 46–56

Jamsil Gymnasium, Seoul

23 September 1988

South Korea	73–110	Soviet Union
Scoring by half: 38–59, 35–51

Jamsil Gymnasium, Seoul

24 September 1988

Australia	95–75	South Korea
Scoring by half: 51–39, 44–36

Jamsil Gymnasium, Seoul

Classification round 9–12

26 September 1988
09:45

Boxscore

China	90–93	South Korea
Scoring by half: 48–47, 42–46
Pts: Li 22; Rebs: Wang L. 7 Asts: Li 2		Pts: Kim HJ 17; Rebs: Kim YT 12; Asts: Kim HJ, Kim YT, Yoo 2

Jamsil Gymnasium, Seoul

Classification round 9/10

29 September 1988
16:30

Boxscore

Central African Republic	81–89	South Korea
Scoring by half: 41–43, 40–46
Pts: Lavodrama 14; Rebs: Lavodrama 12; Asts: Kotta 3		Pts: Lee CH 31; Rebs: Lee MK 8 Asts: Kim HJ 6

Jamsil Gymnasium, Seoul

=== Women's tournament ===
Team roster

The following is the South Korea roster in the women's basketball tournament of the 1988 Summer Olympics.

South Korea women's national basketball team – 1988 Summer Olympics roster
Players
Coaches

Pos.	No.	Name	Age – Date of birth	Height	Club	Ctr.
	4	Lee Kum-jin	23 – 1 February 1965
	5	Kim Mal-lyun	35 – 28 June 1953
	6	Choi Kyung-hee	22 – 25 February 1966
	7	Lee Hyung-sook	23 – 24 December 1964
	8	Park Chan-mi	24 – 22 May 1964
	9	Woo Eun-kyung	26 – 19 August 1962
	10	Jeong Mi-kyeong	22 – 23 December 1965
	11	Kim Hwa-soon	26 – 12 April 1962
	12	Kim Hye-youn	28 – 3 June 1960
	13	Park Chan-sook	29 – 3 June 1959
	14	Sung Jung-a	22 – 25 December 1965
	15	Cho Mun-chu	24 – 29 July 1964

Legend

- Club – describes last
  club before the tournament
- Age – describes age
  on 17 September 1988

Group play

Pos	Team	Pld	W	L	PF	PA	PD	Pts	Qualification
1	Australia	3	2	1	178	196	−18	5 (Note: Head-to-head record: Australia 1–0 Soviet Union)	Semifinals
2	Soviet Union	3	2	1	208	188	+20	5	Semifinals
3	Bulgaria	3	1	2	217	241	−24	4 (Note: Head-to-head record: Bulgaria 1–0 South Korea)	Classification round
4	South Korea (H)	3	1	2	244	222	+22	4	Classification round

Source: FIBA
Rules for classification: 1) points; 2) head-to-head points; 3) head-to-head goal average; 4) head-to-head number of points scored.
(H) Hosts
Notes:

19 September 1988
19:30

Boxscore

Australia	55–91	South Korea
Scoring by half: 20–41, 35–50
Pts: Gorman 11; Rebs: Gorman 8 Asts: Maher, Timms 3		Pts: Lee KJ 19; Rebs: Choi, Kim HS 4 Asts: Lee HS, Sung 2

Jamsil Gymnasium, Seoul

22 September 1988
11:45

Boxscore

South Korea	66–69	Soviet Union
Scoring by half: 35–33, 31–36
Pts: Choi 20; Rebs: Sung 14		Pts: Savitskaya 18; Rebs: Savitskaya 6 Asts: Sumnikova 2

Jamsil Gymnasium, Seoul

25 September 1988
19:30

Boxscore

Bulgaria	98–87	South Korea
Scoring by half: 48–51, 50–36
Pts: Slavcheva 39; Rebs: Slavcheva 8 Asts: Kostourkova 3		Pts: Choi 26; Rebs: Choi, Sung 7 Asts: 5 players 1

Jamsil Gymnasium, Seoul

Classification 5–8

27 September 1988
21:30

Boxscore

China	97–95 (OT)	South Korea
Scoring by half: 43–38, 42–47 Overtime: 12–10
Pts: Liu 24; Rebs: Liu 6 Asts: Xue 5		Pts: Choi 21; Rebs: Sung 7 Asts: Jeong, Park CM, Sung 2

Jamsil Gymnasium, Seoul

Classification 7/8

28 September 1988
19:30

Boxscore

South Korea	77–59	Czechoslovakia
Scoring by half: 41–26, 36–33
Pts: Choi 18; Rebs: Sung 6 Asts: Kim HS 3		Pts: Janoštinová 14; Rebs: Janoštinová 10; Asts: Janoštinová, Nováková 3

Jamsil Gymnasium, Seoul

== Cycling ==
Fifteen cyclists, eleven men and four women, represented South Korea in 1988.

Men's road race

- Park Hyeon-gon
- Lee Jin-ok
- Sin Dae-cheol

Men's team time trial

- Jo Deok-haeng
- Lee Jin-ok
- Park Hyeon-gon
- Yu Byeong-heon

Men's sprint

- Eom Yeong-seop

Men's 1 km time trial

- Eom Yeong-seop

Men's individual pursuit

- Park Min-su

Men's team pursuit

- An U-hyeok
- Jeong Jeom-sik
- Kim Yong-gyu
- Park Min-su

Men's points race

- Do Eun-cheol

Women's road race

- Kim Gyeong-suk
- No Yeom-ju
- Hong Yeong-mi

Women's sprint

- Kim Jin-yeong

== Diving ==
Men

Athlete	Event	Preliminary		Final	
Athlete	Event	Points	Rank	Points	Rank
Lee Seon-gi	3 m springboard	362.58	32	Did not advance	
Lee Seon-gi	10 m platform	420.45	26	Did not advance	

Women

Athlete	Event	Preliminary		Final	
Athlete	Event	Points	Rank	Points	Rank
Kim Eun-hui	3 m springboard	357.96	24	Did not advance	
Kim Eun-hui	10 m platform	284.25	20	Did not advance	

== Fencing ==
20 fencers, 15 men and 5 women, represented South Korea in 1988.

Men's foil

- Kim Seung-pyo
- Go Nak-chun
- Kim Yong-guk

Men's team foil

- Hong Yeong-seung, Kim Seung-pyo, Kim Yong-guk, Go Nak-chun, Lee Yeong-rok

Men's épée

- Lee Sang-gi
- Yun Nam-jin
- Lee Il-hui

Men's team épée

- Jo Hui-je, Lee Il-hui, Lee Sang-gi, Yang Dal-sik, Yun Nam-jin

Men's sabre

- Lee Byeong-nam
- Kim Sang-uk
- Lee Uk-jae

Men's team sabre

- Kim Sang-uk, Lee Byeong-nam, Lee Hyo-geun, Lee Hyeon-su, Lee Uk-jae

Women's foil

- Tak Jeong-im
- Shin Seong-ja
- Park Eun-hui

Women's team foil

- Kim Jin-sun, Shin Seong-ja, Tak Jeong-im, Yun Jeong-suk, Park Eun-hui

== Hockey ==
=== Men's team competition ===
- Preliminary round (group B)

- South Korea — Great Britain 2–2
- South Korea — Soviet Union 1–3
- South Korea — India 1–3
- South Korea — West Germany 0–1
- South Korea — Canada 1–1

- Classification Matches

- 9th–12th place: South Korea — Kenya 5–2
- 9th–10th place: South Korea — Spain 0–2 (→ Tenth place)

- Team roster

- (1.) Song Suk-chan
- (2.) Kim Yeong-jun
- (3.) Kim Jong-kap
- (4.) Chung Boo-jin
- (5.) Chung Kye-suk
- (6.) Kim Jae-chun
- (7.) Kwon Soon-pil
- (8.) Mo Ji-young
- (9.) Ji Jae-kwan
- (10.) Kim Man-whe
- (11.) Han Jin-soo
- (12.) Lee Heung-pyo
- (13.) Hur Sang-young
- (14.) Park Jae-sik
- (15.) Yoo Seung-jin
- (16.) Shin Suk-kyun

- Head coach: Yoo Seung-in

=== Women's team competition ===
- Preliminary round (group B)

- South Korea — West Germany 4–1
- South Korea — Canada 3–1
- South Korea — Australia 5–5

- Semi Finals

- South Korea — Great Britain 1–0

- Final

- South Korea — Australia 0–2 (→ Silver Medal)

- Team roster

- (1.) Kim Mi-sun
- (2.) Han Ok-kyung
- (3.) Chang Eun-jung
- (4.) Han Keum-sil
- (5.) Choi Choon-ok
- (6.) Kim Soon-duk
- (7.) Chung Sang-hyun
- (8.) Jin Won-sim
- (9.) Hwang Keum-sook
- (10.) Cho Ki-hyang
- (11.) Seo Kwang-mi
- (12.) Park Soon-ja
- (13.) Kim Young-sook
- (14.) Seo Hyo-sun
- (15.) Lim Kye-sook
- (16.) Chung Eun-kyung

- Head coach: Yoo Young-chae

== Modern pentathlon ==
Three male pentathlete represented South Korea in 1988.

Men's Individual Competition:

- Kim Myeong-geon — 5099 pts, 12th place
- Gang Gyeong-hyo — 5074 pts, 13th place
- Kim Seong-ho — 3854 pts, 61st place

Men's Team Competition:

- Kim, Kang, and Kim — 14027 pts, 14th place

== Shooting ==
Twenty two South Korean shooters (fourteen men and eight women) qualified to compete in the following events:

Men

Athlete	Event	Qualification		Final	
Athlete	Event	Points	Rank	Points	Rank
An Byung-kyun	10 m air rifle	590	8 Q	690.7	7
Yang Chung-yul	25 m rapid fire pistol	591	9	Did not advance	
Lee Eun-chul	50 m rifle 3 positions	1161	28	Did not advance	
Lee Eun-chul	10 m air rifle	589	12	Did not advance	
Lim Jang-soo	25 m rapid fire pistol	575	32	Did not advance	
Park Jong-shin	10 m air pistol	577	18	Did not advance	
Kwak Jung-hoon	50 m rifle prone	594	24	Did not advance	
Hong Seung-pyo	50 m running target	577	19	Did not advance	
Kwon Taek-yul	50 m rifle 3 positions	1165	21	Did not advance	
Cha Young-chul	50 m rifle prone	598	2 Q	702.8	2nd place, silver medalist(s)
Min Young-sam	50 m pistol	552	29	Did not advance	
Min Young-sam	10 m air pistol	575	23	Did not advance	

Women

Athlete	Event	Qualification		Final	
Athlete	Event	Points	Rank	Points	Rank
Kang Hye-ja	10 m air rifle	391	12	Did not advance	
Lee Hye-kyung	50 m rifle three positions	575	23	Did not advance	
Bang Hyun-joo	10 m air pistol	376	19	Did not advance	
Park Jung-hee	10 m air pistol	378	12	Did not advance	
Lee Mi-kyung	10 m air rifle	385	30	Did not advance	
Boo Sun-hee	25 m pistol	576	27	Did not advance	
Kim Young-mi	50 m rifle three positions	568	30	Did not advance	
Hong Young-ok	25 m pistol	575	28	Did not advance	

Open

Athlete	Event	Qualification		Semifinal		Final	
Athlete	Event	Points	Rank	Points	Rank	Points	Rank
Park Chul-sung	Trap	144	19 Q	191	16	Did not advance	
Kim Ha-yeon	Skeet	141	40	Did not advance			
Kim Kon-il	Trap	142	25	Did not advance			
Byun Kyung-soo	Trap	141	30	Did not advance			

== Swimming ==
Men's 50 m Freestyle

- Song Kwang-sun
  1. Heat – 25.40 (→ did not advance, 54th place)

Men's 100 m Freestyle

- Kwon Sang-won
  1. Heat – 54.34 (→ did not advance, 55th place)
- Song Kwang-sun
  1. Heat – 54.63 (→ did not advance, 57th place)

Men's 200 m Freestyle

- Kwon Sang-won
  1. Heat – 1:56.88 (→ did not advance, 45th place)
- Kwon Soon-kun
  1. Heat – 1:58.95 (→ did not advance, 54th place)

Men's 400 m Freestyle

- Yang Wook
  1. Heat – 4:05.81 (→ did not advance, 39th place)
- Kwon Soon-kun
  1. Heat – 4:08.02 (→ did not advance, 42nd place)

Men's 1500 m Freestyle

- Yang Wook
  1. Heat – 16:21.10 (→ did not advance, 34th place)

Men's 100 m Backstroke

- Park Dong-pil
  1. Heat – 1:01.25 (→ did not advance, 40th place)

Men's 200 m Backstroke

- Park Dong-pil
  1. Heat – DSQ (→ did not advance, no ranking)

Men's 100 m Breaststroke

- Yoon Joo-il
  1. Heat – 1:04.68 (→ did not advance, 26th place)

Men's 200 m Breaststroke

- Yoon Joo-il
  1. Heat – 2:19.94 (→ did not advance, 22nd place)

Men's 100 m Butterfly

- Park Yeong-cheol
  1. Heat – 57.74 (→ did not advance, 38th place)

Men's 200 m Butterfly

- Park Yeong-cheol
  1. Heat – 2:08.57 (→ did not advance, 35th place)

Men's 200 m Individual Medley

- Lee Jae-soo
  1. Heat – 2:11.88 (→ did not advance, 35th place)

Men's 400 m Individual Medley

- Lee Jae-soo
  1. Heat – 4:40.46 (→ did not advance, 28th place)

Men's 4 × 100 m Freestyle Relay

- Kwon Sang-won, Yang Wook, Song Kwang-sun, and Kwon Soon-kun
  1. Heat – 3:38.05 (→ did not advance, 17th place)

Men's 4 × 200 m Freestyle Relay

- Kwon Sang-won, Yang Wook, Song Kwang-sun, and Kwon Soon-kun
  1. Heat – 7:52.93 (→ did not advance, 12th place)

Men's 4 × 100 m Medley Relay

- Park Dong-pil, Yoon Joo-Il, Park Yeong-cheol, and Kwon Sang-won
  1. Heat – 3:56.94 (→ did not advance, 21st place)

Women's 50 m Freestyle

- Han Young-hee
  1. Heat – 28.02 (→ did not advance, 34th place)
- Park Joo-li
  1. Heat – 28.20 (→ did not advance, 36th place)

Women's 100 m Freestyle

- Kim Eun-jung
  1. Heat – 1:00.39 (→ did not advance, 43rd place)
- Han Young-hee
  1. Heat – 1:01.72 (→ did not advance, 46th place)

Women's 200 m Freestyle

- Kim Eun-jung
  1. Heat – 2:10.85 (→ did not advance, 37th place)
- Park Joo-li
  1. Heat – 2:11.53 (→ did not advance, 39th place)

Women's 100 m Backstroke

- Hong Ji-hee
  1. Heat – 1:08.33 (→ did not advance, 30th place)

Women's 200 m Backstroke

- Hong Ji-hee
  1. Heat – 2:24.58 (→ did not advance, 26th place)

Women's 100 m Breaststroke

- Park Sung-won
  1. Heat – 1:12.32 (→ did not advance, 18th place)

Women's 200 m Breaststroke

- Park Sung-won
  1. Heat – 2:39.40 (→ did not advance, 29th place)

Women's 100 m Butterfly

- Lee Hong-mi
  1. Heat – 1:04.36 (→ did not advance, 26th place)
- Kim Soo-jin
  1. Heat – 1:06.14 (→ did not advance, 30th place)

Women's 200 m Butterfly

- Kim Soo-jin
  1. Heat – 2:19.00 (→ did not advance, 20th place)

Women's 4 × 100 m Freestyle Relay

- Kim Eun-jung, Han Young-hee, Park Joo-li, and Lee Hong-mi
  1. Heat – 4:03.18 (→ did not advance, 13th place)

Women's 4 × 100 m Medley Relay

- Hong Ji-hee, Park Sung-won, Lee Hong-mi, and Han Young-hee
  1. Heat – 4:28.90 (→ did not advance, 14th place)

== Synchronized swimming ==
Three synchronized swimmers represented South Korea in 1988.

Women's solo

- Ha Su-gyeong
- Choi Jeong-yun
- Kim Mi-jinsu

Women's duet

- Ha Su-gyeong
- Kim Mi-jinsu

== Tennis ==
Men's Singles Competition

- Kim Bong-soo
  1. First round — Defeated George Kalovelonis (Greece) 7–5, 3–6, 6–2, 6–7, 6–3
  2. Second round — Defeated Henri Leconte (France) 4–6, 7–5, 6–3, 3–6, 7–5
  3. Third round — Lost to Martín Jaite (Argentina) 4–6, 1–6, 3–6
- Yoo Jin-sun
  1. First round — Lost to Amos Mansdorf (Israel) 2–6, 4–6, 5–7
- Song Dong-wook
  1. First round — Lost to Tim Mayotte (USA) 3–6, 3–6, 4–6

Women's Singles Competition

- Lee Jeong-myung
  1. First Round – Bye
  2. Second Round – Lost to Catherine Suire (France) 5–7, 6–4, 5–7
- Kim Il-soon
  1. First Round – Defeated Etsuko Inoue (Japan) 6–3, 3–6, 7–5
  2. Second Round – Defeated Helena Suková (Czechoslovakia) 6–2, 4–6, 6–2
  3. Third Round – Lost to Larisa Neiland (Soviet Union) 3–6, 6–7

== Volleyball ==
=== Men's team competition ===
- Preliminary round (group A)

- Lost to Sweden (2–3)
- Defeated Brazil (3–2)
- Lost to Soviet Union (0–3)
- Lost to Bulgaria (0–3)
- Lost to Italy (0–3)

- Classification Matches

- 9th/12th place: Lost to Japan (2–3)
- 11th/12th place: Defeated Tunisia (3–0) → 11th place

- Team roster

- Choi Chon-sik
- Lee Sang-yul
- Chang Yun-chang
- Han Jang-sok
- Lee Seong-hui
- Kim Eun-sok
- Park Sam-yong
- Lee Myung-hak
- Kim Ho-chul
- Lee Chae-on
- Lee Jong-kyung
- Jung Eu-tak

- Head coach: Lee Kyu-so

=== Women's team competition ===
- Preliminary round (group A)

- Defeated East Germany (3–1)
- Lost to Soviet Union (0–3)
- Lost to Japan (1–3)

- Classification Matches

- 5th/8th place: Lost to Brazil (2–3)
- 7th/8th place: Lost to United States (2–3) → 8th place

- Team roster

- Park Mi-hee
- Kim Kyung-hee
- Kim Kui-soon
- Lim Hye-sook
- Yoo Young-mi
- Nam Soon-ok
- Yoon Chung-hye
- Park Bok-rye
- Kim Yoon-hye
- Sun Mi-sook
- Moon Sun-hee
- Ji Kyung-hee

- Head coach: Hwang Sung-on

== Water polo ==
=== Men's team competition ===
- Preliminary round (group A)

- Lost to France (5–16)
- Lost to Italy (1–11)
- Lost to West Germany (2–18)
- Lost to Soviet Union (4–17)
- Lost to Australia (2–13)

- Classification Round (Group E)

- Lost to Greece (7–17)
- Lost to China (7–14) → Twelfth place

- Team roster

- Lee Jung-suk
- Chang Si-young
- Kim Sung-eun
- Yoo Seung-hoon
- Kim Ki-choon
- Kim Jae-yun
- Choi Sun-young
- Kim Kil-hwan
- Kim Jin-tae
- Song Seung-ho
- Hong Soon-bo
- Lee Taek-won
- Park Sang-won

- Head coach: Kim Jong-ku
