= Kwon =

Kwon (권)
- Pronunciation: /kwʌ̹n/
- Language: Korean

- Kwon
- Hangul: 권
- Hanja: 權
- RR: Gwon
- MR: Kwŏn

Kwon also written as Gwon (Korean: 권; Hanja: 權 [kwʌn]) is a Korean family name. Some sources list as many as 56 clans, but most of them were merged with the Andong Gwon clan under the Sijeung-gong faction soon after the establishment of the Goryeo Kingdom.

== Andong Kwon clan ==
The founder of Andong Kwon clan, Kim Haeng (金幸), was originally a royalty of the Silla Gyeongju Kim clan. He participated in the Battle of Gochang and helped Taejo, who established the Kingdom of Goryeo in 918; the new king bestowed upon Kim Haeng a new surname: Kwon (權), as he could judge the situation correctly and achieve a purpose flexibly (能炳幾達權).

The clan had alternative older names as the Seokreung Kwon clan (石陵權氏), Koryeong Kwon clan (古寧權氏), Hwasan Kwon clan (花山權氏), Reungra Kwon clan (綾羅權氏), Jipyeong Kwon clan (地平權氏), Ilgye Kwon clan (一界權氏), and Gojang Kwon clan (古藏權氏).

== Yecheon Kwon clan ==
The original surname of the Yecheon Kwon clan was Hŭn (흔; 昕). However, they were forced to change their surname due to having the same character as the personal name of King Chungmok of Goryeo, which was Wang Hŭn (왕흔; 王昕). Due to the naming taboo of using the character of the king's personal name, the Hŭn family changed their surname to Kwon (權), which was the surname of the mother of the clan head. The head of the Hŭn clan at this time, Kwon Sŏm (권섬; 權暹), became the founding ancestor of the Yecheon Kwon clan. Approximately two thirds of clan members live in the Gyeongsang provinces. All members of the Heun (昕) clan disappeared before the founding of Joseon.

Another account states that the Yecheon Heun (昕) clan's Jeoksin, Suchang, Seungdan, and Seungjo married into the Andong Kwon clan and afterward their descendants took their mothers' surname Kwon (權). Yecheon Kwon clan called an Obongmun (五福門) in late Goryeo.

== Notable people (historic) ==
- Queen Hyeondeok (1418–1441), Joseon consort
- Kwŏn Kŭn (1352–1409), Joseon Neo-Confucian scholar
- Kwŏn Ram (1416–1465), Joseon politician, writer, historian
- Gwon Sang-ha (1641–1712), Joseon politician and Neo-Confucian scholar
- Kwŏn Tumun (1543–1617), Joseon scholar-official and military leader
- Gwon Yul (1537–1599), Joseon general

== Notable people (contemporary) ==
=== Entertainment ===
- Kwon Ah-reum (born 1996), South Korean actress
- Kwon Boa (stage name BoA, born 1986), South Korean singer-songwriter, dancer, record producer, actress
- Kwon Chae-won (born 1999), South Korean singer, member of girl group DIA
- Edward Young-min Kwon (born 1972), South Korean celebrity chef
- Kwon Eun-bi (born 1995), South Korean singer
- Kwon Eun-bin (born 2000), South Korean singer, member of girl group CLC
- Kwon Eun-soo (born 1989), South Korean actress and model
- Kwon Hae-hyo (born 1965), South Korean actor and activist
- Kwon Han-sol (born 1996), South Korean actress
- Kwon Hee-deok (1956–2018), South Korean voice actress and writer
- Kwon Hyuk (actor) (born 1989), South Korean actor and model
- Dean (South Korean singer) (born Kwon Hyuk, 1992), South Korean singer-songwriter, rapper, producer
- Kwon Hwa-woon (born 1989), South Korean actor and model
- Kwon Hyeok-soo (voice actor) (born 1954), South Korean voice actor and actor
- Kwon Hyuk-soo (actor) (born 1986), South Korean actor, singer, comedian
- Loco (rapper) (born Kwon Hyuk-woo, 1989), South Korean rapper
- Kwon Hyun-bin (born 1997), South Korean rapper and actor
- Kwon Hyung-jin (born 1964), South Korean film director
- Solbi (born Kwon Ji-an, 1984), South Korean actress and singer
- G-Dragon (born Kwon Ji-yong, 1988), South Korean rapper, member of boy band Big Bang
- Kwon Jin-ah (born 1997), South Korean singer-songwriter
- Kwon Jung-yeol (born 1983), South Korean singer-songwriter, member of 10cm
- Kwon Mina (born 1993), South Korean singer and actress
- Sik-K (born Kwon Min-sik, 1994), South Korean rapper
- Kwon Nara (born 1991), South Korean singer
- Kwon Oh-joong (born 1971), South Korean actor
- Kwon Ri-se (1991–2014), South Korean singer, member of girl group Ladies' Code
- Kwon Sang-woo (born 1976), South Korean actor
- Sogumm (born Kwon So-hee, 1994), South Korean singer-songwriter
- Kwon So-hyun (born 1994), South Korean singer and dancer
- Kwon So-hyun (actress) (born 1987), South Korean actress
- Kwon Soo-hyun (actor) (born 1986), South Korean actor
- Hoshi (born Kwon Soon-young, 1996), South Korean singer and dancer, member of boy band Seventeen
- Kwon Yu-ri (born 1989), South Korean singer and actress, member of girl group Girls' Generation
- Yul Kwon (born 1975), American television host
- Kwon Yul (actor) (born 1982), South Korean actor
- Nana (born Kwon Na-yeon, 2001), South Korean singer, dancer, and actress, member of girl group Wooah
- JNKYRD (born Kwon Seong-cheol, 1988), South Korean musician, singer-songwriter, record producer and member of Hyukoh

=== Politics ===
- Kwon Chil-seung (born 1965), South Korean politician
- Kwon Deok-cheol (born 1961), South Korean government official
- Kwon Eun-hee (born 1974), South Korean politician, police officer, lawyer
- Kwon In-sook (born 1964), South Korean labor organizer and politician
- Kwon Jung-dong (1932–2021), South Korean politician
- Gwon Jung-hyeon (politician) (1854–1934), Korean general and politician
- Kwon O-kyu (born 1952), South Korean politician
- Kweon Seong-dong, South Korean politician and lawyer
- Kwon Yang-sook (born 1947), former First Lady of South Korea
- Kwon Yeong-guk (born 1963), South Korean politician and lawyer
- Kwon Yong-jin, North Korean politician and military officer
- Kwon Young-ghil (born 1941), South Korean politician, journalist, trade unionist
- Kwon Young-jin (politician) (born 1962), South Korean politician
- Kwon Young-se (born 1959), South Korean politician and diplomat

=== Sports ===
- Kwon Chan-soo (born 1974), South Korean former footballer
- Kwon Chang-hoon (born 1994), South Korean football player
- Kwon Chang-sook (born 1971), South Korean former field hockey player
- Kwon Da-kyung (born 1989), South Korean professional footballer
- Kwon Dae-hee (born 1989), South Korean footballer
- Elizabeth Kwon (born 1986), American figure skater
- Kwon Eun-ji (born 2002), South Korean sport shooter
- Kwon Eun-kyung (born 1985), South Korean taekwondo practitioner
- Kwon Eun-som (born 1990), South Korean footballer
- Kwon Geun-hae (born 1987), South Korean team handball player
- Kwon Gi-pyo (born 1997), South Korean footballer
- Kwon Ha-lim (born 1999), South Korean diver
- Kwon Hah-nul (born 1988), South Korean footballer
- Kweon Han-jin (born 1988), South Korean footballer
- Gwon Han-na (born 1989), South Korean handball player
- Kwon Hyeok-kyu (born 2001), South Korean footballer
- Kwon Hyo-kyeong (born 2001), South Korean wheelchair fencer
- Kwon Hyuk (baseball) (born 1983), South Korean baseball player
- Gwon Ik-hyeon (1920–2002), South Korean racing cyclist
- Kwon Jin-young (born 1991), South Korean footballer
- Kwon Jip (born 1984), South Korean former footballer
- Kwon Jong-chul (born 1963), South Korean retired football referee
- Kwon Jun (born 1987), South Korean footballer
- Kwon Jun-cheol (born 1988), South Korean sports shooter
- Gwon Jung-hyeon (cyclist) (born 1942), South Korean former cyclist
- Kwon Jung-hyuk (born 1978), South Korean footballer
- Kwon Kwang-il (born 1990), North Korean sport shooter
- Kwon Kyung-ho (born 1986), South Korean footballer
- Kwon Kyung-min (born 1982), South Korean diver
- Kwon Kyung-won (born 1992), South Korean footballer
- Kweon Lee-jun (born 1997), South Korean snowboarder
- Kwon Mi-sook (born 1972), South Korean former table tennis player
- Kwon Min-sol (born 2009), South Korean figure skater
- Striker (gamer) (born Kwon Nam-joo, c. 1999), South Korean Overwatch player
- Kwon Oh-hee (born 1978), South Korean tennis player
- Kwon Oh-son (born 1959), South Korean former footballer
- Kwon Ryong-jun (born 1975), North Korean football manager
- Gwon Sang-won (born 1969), South Korean swimmer
- Kwon Seok-geun (born 1983), South Korean footballer
- Gwon Seong-nak (born 1964), South Korean long-distance runner
- Kwon Song-hwa (born 1992), North Korean footballer
- Kwon Soo-hyun (field hockey) (born 1974), South Korean former field hockey player
- Kwon Soon-chun (born 1959), South Korean retired boxer
- Kwon Soon-hyung (born 1986), South Korean former footballer
- Kwon Soon-woo (born 1997), South Korean tennis player
- Gwon Sun-cheon (born 1983), South Korean speed skater
- Gwon Sun-geun (born 1969), South Korean swimmer
- Kwon Sun-oo (born 1999), South Korean snowboarder
- Kwon Sun-pil (born 1967), South Korean field hockey player
- Kwoun Sun-tae (born 1984), South Korean former footballer
- Kwon Sun-yong (born 1995), North Korean judoka
- Kwon Tae-ho (born 1971), South Korean taekwondo practitioner
- Kwon Tae-man (born 1941), South Korean hapkido practitioner
- Kwon Taek-yul (born 1957), South Korean sport shooter
- Kwon Tong-hyok (born 1985), North Korean sport shooter
- Kwon Un-sil (born 1983), North Korean archer
- Kwon Wan-kyu (born 1991), South Korean footballer
- Kwon Won-il (born 1995), South Korean mixed martial artist
- Kwon Yi-goo (born 1987), South Korean badminton player
- Kwon Yi-woon (born 1950), South Korean retired footballer
- Kwon Yong-gwang (born 1996), North Korean weightlifter
- Kwon Yong-hyun (born 1991), South Korean footballer
- Kwon Yong-kwan (born 1976), South Korean former baseball player
- Kwon You-jeong (born 1995), South Korean judoka
- Kwon You-ri (born 1989), South Korean swimmer
- Kwon Young-ho (born 1992), South Korean footballer
- Kwon Young-il, South Korean curler and curling coach
- Kwon Young-jin (footballer) (born 1991), South Korean footballer
- Kwon Young-jin (wrestler) (born 1999), South Korean wrestler
- Kweon Young-jun (born 1987), South Korean fencer
- Kwon Young-woo (born 1981), South Korean judoka

=== Others ===
- Andrew Kwon (born 1995), American fashion designer
- Do Kwon (born 1991), South Korean former businessman and software engineer
- Kwon Hyeok-ung (born 1967), South Korean poet, literary critic, professor
- Kwon Hyouk-se (born 1956), South Korean civil servant
- Kwon Hyuk-bin (born 1974), South Korean businessman, investor, philanthropist
- Kwon Jeong-saeng (1937–2007), South Korean writer
- Kwon Ji-ye (born 1960), South Korean writer
- Kwon Jung Ho (born 1944), South Korean artist, sculptor, educator
- Kweon Kab-yong (1957–2023), South Korean go player
- Kwon Ki-ok (1901–1988), the first Korean female aviator
- Min Kwon, Korean-American pianist
- Kwon Museok (born 1942), Korean intangible cultural asset, recognized artisan of Gungdo
- Kwon Oh-hyun (born 1952), South Korean businessman
- R. O. Kwon, South Korean–born American author
- Kwon Teckyoung (born 1947), South Korean literary critic, translator, professor
- Kwon Yeo-sun (born 1965), South Korean writer

== See also ==
- List of Korean family names
- Korean name
- Kwon the Redeemer
