= Athletics at the 1988 Summer Olympics – Men's marathon =

Men's marathon at the Games of the XXIV Olympiad
- Seoul Olympic Stadium (2012)
- Venue: Jamsil Olympic Stadium, Seoul
- Dates: October 2
- Competitors: 118 from 66 nations
- Winning time: 2:10:59

Medalists
1st place, gold medalist(s)		Gelindo Bordin; Italy
2nd place, silver medalist(s)		Douglas Wakiihuri; Kenya
3rd place, bronze medalist(s)		Hussein Ahmed Salah; Djibouti

The men's marathon at the 1988 Summer Olympics in Seoul, South Korea was held on Sunday October 2, 1988. The race started at 14:30h local time. A total of 98 athletes completed the race, with Polin Belisle from Belize finishing in last position in 3'14:02. There were 118 competitors from 60 countries. Twenty of them did not finish. The maximum number of athletes per nation had been set at 3 since the 1930 Olympic Congress. The event was won by Gelindo Bordin of Italy, the nation's first victory in the Olympic men's marathon and first medal in the event since 1924. Kenya (Douglas Wakiihuri's silver) and Djibouti (Hussein Ahmed Salah's bronze) each won their first Olympic men's marathon medal.

== Background ==
This was the 21st appearance of the event, which is one of 12 athletics events to have been held at every Summer Olympics. Returning runners from the 1984 marathon included silver medalist John Treacy of Ireland, bronze medalist Charlie Spedding of Great Britain, fifth-place finisher Robert de Castella of Australia, and sixth-place finisher Juma Ikangaa of Tanzania. The favorites included de Castella, Gelindo Bordin of Italy, and rising star Hussein Ahmed Salah of Djibouti. Douglas Wakiihuri of Kenya had won the 1987 world championship over Ahmed Salah and Bordin.

American Samoa, Angola, Belize, (the People's Republic of) China, Fiji, Guam, Guinea, the Maldives, Niger, Rwanda, and the Solomon Islands each made their first appearance in Olympic men's marathons. The United States made its 20th appearance, most of any nation, having missed only the boycotted 1980 Games.

Gary Fanelli of the United States moved to Tafuna, American Samoa six months prior to the 1988 Summer Olympics in Seoul in order to coach and attain his Olympic eligibility for America Samoa. Fanelli's time of 2:25:35, good for 51st place, is an American Samoan national record.

== Competition format and course ==
As all Olympic marathons, the competition was a single race. The marathon distance of 26 miles, 385 yards was run over an out-and-back route starting and finishing at the Olympic Stadium, running along the Han River.

== Records ==
These were the standing world and Olympic records prior to the 1988 Summer Olympics.

World record	Belayneh Densamo (ETH)	2:06:50	Rotterdam, Netherlands	17 April 1988
Olympic record	Carlos Lopes (POR)	2:09:21	Los Angeles, United States	12 August July 1984

No new world or Olympic bests were set during the competition.

== Schedule ==
All times are Korea Standard Time adjusted for daylight savings (UTC+10)

Date	Time	Round
Sunday, 2 October 1988	14:35	Final

== Results ==
Rank	Athlete	Nation	Time
1st place, gold medalist(s)	Gelindo Bordin	Italy	2:10:32
2nd place, silver medalist(s)	Douglas Wakiihuri	Kenya	2:10:47
3rd place, bronze medalist(s)	Hussein Ahmed Salah	Djibouti	2:10:59
4	Takeyuki Nakayama	Japan	2:11:05
5	Steve Moneghetti	Australia	2:11:49
6	Charlie Spedding	Great Britain	2:12:19
7	Juma Ikangaa	Tanzania	2:13:06
8	Robert de Castella	Australia	2:13:07
9	Toshihiko Seko	Japan	2:13:41
10	Ravil Kashapov	Soviet Union	2:13:49
11	Jesús Herrera	Mexico	2:13:58
12	John Campbell	New Zealand	2:14:08
13	Gerard Nijboer	Netherlands	2:14:40
14	Pete Pfitzinger	United States	2:14:44
15	Marti ten Kate	Netherlands	2:14:53
16	Orlando Pizzolato	Italy	2:15:20
17	Hisatoshi Shintaku	Japan	2:15:42
18	Kim Won-Tak	South Korea	2:15:44
19	Gianni Poli	Italy	2:16:07
20	Dieudonné LaMothe	Haiti	2:16:15
21	Dave Long	Great Britain	2:16:18
22	Henrik Jørgensen	Denmark	2:16:40
23	Ralf Salzmann	West Germany	2:16:54
24	Dick Hooper	Ireland	2:17:16
25	Miroslavo Vindiš	Yugoslavia	2:17:47
26	Cai Shangyan	China	2:17:54
27	Joaquim Silva	Portugal	2:18:05
28	Art Boileau	Canada	2:18:20
29	Ed Eyestone	United States	2:19:09
30	Noureddine Sobhi	Morocco	2:19:56
31	Yu Jae-seong	South Korea	2:20:11
32	Mehmet Terzi	Turkey	2:20:12
33	Kevin Forster	Great Britain	2:20:45
34	Bigboy Josie Matlapeng	Botswana	2:20:51
35	Allaoua Khellil	Algeria	2:21:12
36	Justin Gloden	Luxembourg	2:22:14
37	Alexandre Gonzalez	France	2:22:24
38	Zhang Guowei	China	2:22:49
39	Pedro Ortiz	Colombia	2:23:34
40	Ronald Lanzoni	Costa Rica	2:23:45
41	Bradley Camp	Australia	2:23:49
42	Adolphe Ambowode	Central African Republic	2:23:52
43	John Burra	Tanzania	2:24:17
44	Samuel Hlawe	Swaziland	2:24:42
45	Juan Amores	Costa Rica	2:24:49
46	Peter Maher	Canada	2:24:49
47	Abdou Manzo	Niger	2:25:05
48	Diamantino dos Santos	Brazil	2:25:13
49	Omar Moussa	Djibouti	2:25:25
50	Carlos Retiz	Mexico	2:25:34
51	Gary Fanelli	American Samoa	2:25:35
52	John Woods	Ireland	2:25:38
53	Gideon Mthembu	Swaziland	2:25:56
54	Baikuntha Manandhar	Nepal	2:25:57
55	Karel David	Czechoslovakia	2:26:12
56	Ivo Rodrigues	Brazil	2:26:27
57	Martín Mondragón	Mexico	2:27:10
58	Vusie Dlamini	Swaziland	2:28:06
59	Inni Aboubacar	Niger	2:28:15
60	Yohanna Waziri	Nigeria	2:29:14
61	Noheku Nteso	Lesotho	2:29:44
62	Benjamin Longiros	Uganda	2:30:29
63	Vincent Ruguga	Uganda	2:31:04
64	Alfonso Abellán	Spain	2:31:10
65	Vithanakande Samarasinghe	Sri Lanka	2:31:29
66	Tika Bogati	Nepal	2:31:49
67	Dave Edge	Canada	2:32:19
68	Luis López	Costa Rica	2:32:43
69	Juan Camacho	Bolivia	2:34:41
70	Abbas Mohamed	Nigeria	2:35:26
71	Ahmet Altun	Turkey	2:37:44
72	James Gombedza	Zimbabwe	2:38:13
73	Kamana Koji	Zaire	2:38:34
74	João Carvalho	Angola	2:40:45
75	Aaron Dupnai	Papua New Guinea	2:41:47
76	Bineshwar Prasad	Fiji	2:41:50
77	Calvin Dallas	Virgin Islands	2:42:19
78	Telesphore Dusabe	Rwanda	2:42:52
79	Eugène Muslar	Belize	2:43:29
80	Hassan Karimou	Niger	2:43:51
81	Wallace Williams	Virgin Islands	2:44:40
82	Mohala Mohloli	Lesotho	2:44:44
83	Awadh Shaban Al-Sameer	Oman	2:46:59
84	Derick Adamson	Jamaica	2:47:57
85	Krishna Bahadur Basnet	Nepal	2:47:57
86	Fred Schumann	Guam	2:49:52
87	John Mwathiwa	Malawi	2:51:43
88	Marlon Williams	Virgin Islands	2:52:06
89	Kaleka Mutoke	Zaire	2:55:21
90	James Walker	Guam	2:56:32
91	Mohiddin Mohamed Kulmiye	Somalia	2:58:10
92	Fred Ogwang	Uganda	2:59:35
93	Naser Babapour	Iran	3:00:20
94	Ricardo Taitano	Guam	3:03:19
95	Baba Ibrahim Suma-Keita	Sierra Leone	3:04:00
96	Alassane Bah	Guinea	3:06:27
97	Nguyễn Văn Thuyết	Vietnam	3:10:57
98	Polin Belisle	Belize	3:14:02
—	Ahmed Mohamed Ismail	Somalia	DNF
—	Bruno Lafranchi	Switzerland	DNF
—	Ibrahim Hussein	Kenya	DNF
—	Alain Lazare	France	DNF
—	John Treacy	Ireland	DNF
—	Dirk Vanderherten	Belgium	DNF
—	Domingo Aguilar	Chile	DNF
—	Honorato Hernández	Spain	DNF
—	Jörg Peter	East Germany	DNF
—	Joseph Kipsang	Kenya	DNF
—	Gwon Seong-nak	South Korea	DNF
—	El Mostafa Nechchadi	Morocco	DNF
—	George Mambosasa	Malawi	DNF
—	Abdul Haji Abdul Latheef	Maldives	DNF
—	Hussein Haleem	Maldives	DNF
—	Geir Kvernmo	Norway	DNF
—	Paulo Catarino	Portugal	DNF
—	John Maeke	Solomon Islands	DNF
—	Martin Vrábeľ	Czechoslovakia	DNF
—	Mark Conover	United States	DNF

== See also ==
- 1986 Men's European Championships Marathon (Stuttgart)
- 1987 Men's World Championships Marathon (Rome)
- 1990 Men's European Championships Marathon (Split)
- 1991 Men's World Championships Marathon (Tokyo)
- 1992 Men's Olympic Marathon (Barcelona)
