= Field hockey at the 1986 Asian Games =

- Venue: Seongnam Field
- Dates: 22 September 1986 – 30 September 1986
- Nations: 9

Field hockey events were contested at the 1986 Asian Games in Seongnam, South Korea.

== Medalists ==
Event	Gold	Silver	Bronze
Men	South Korea; An Jong-rae; Chung Boo-jin; Chung Kye-suk; Han Jin-soo; Han Jong-yeol; Hur Sang-young; Ji Jae-kwan; Kim Jong-kap; Kim Man-whe; Kim Yeong-joon; Kwon Soon-pil; Mo Ji-young; Nam Kung-ok; Shin Suk-kyun; Song Suk-chan; Yoo Seung-jin	Pakistan; Ishtiaq Ahmed; Mansoor Ahmed; Shahbaz Ahmed; Ziauddin Ahmed; Nasir Ali; Wasim Feroz; Rashid-ul-Hassan; Shahidul Islam; Farhat Hassan Khan; Kaleemullah Khan; Ayaz Mahmood; Qazi Mohib; Syed Ghulam Moinuddin; Iftikhar Riaz; Saleem Sherwani; Qasim Zia	India; Abdul Aziz; Jagdeep Singh Gill; Rajinder Singh Rawat; Mohammed Shahid; Vineet Kumar Sharma; Balwinder Singh; Hardeep Singh; Jagbir Singh; Mohinder Pal Singh; Neel Kamal Singh; Pargat Singh; Ram Prakash Singh; Thoiba Singh; Tikken Singh; M. M. Somaya; B. K. Subramani
Women	South Korea; Cho Ki-hyang; Choi Choon-ok; Choi Young-ja; Chung Eun-kyung; Chung Sang-hyun; Han Ok-kyung; Hwang Keum-sook; Jin Won-sim; Kim Mi-ja; Kim Mi-sun; Kim Soon-duk; Kim Young-sook; Lim Kye-sook; Park Soon-ja; Seo Hyo-sun; Seo Kwang-mi	Japan	India; Saroj Bala; Manju Bist; Donita D'Mello; Angela D'Sa; Alma Guria; Kuldeep Kaur; Rajbir Kaur; S. Omana Kumari; Bimal Parbagga; Biswasi Purty; Prem Maya Sonir; Dayamani Soy; Pushpa Srivastava; Ranjana Srivastava; Madhu Yadav; Razia Zaidi

== Medal table ==
Rank	Nation	Gold	Silver	Bronze	Total
1	South Korea	2	0	0	2
2	Japan	0	1	0	1
2	Pakistan	0	1	0	1
4	India	0	0	2	2
Totals (4 entries)		2	2	2	6

== Results ==
=== Men ===
==== Preliminary round ====
===== Group A =====
Team	Pld	W	D	L	GF	GA	GD	Pts
India	4	3	1	0	25	2	+23	7
South Korea	4	3	1	0	23	1	+22	7
Japan	4	2	0	2	14	8	+6	4
Hong Kong	4	1	0	3	2	21	−19	2
Thailand	4	0	0	4	0	32	−32	0

22 September

Japan	10–0	Thailand

Seongnam Field, Seongnam

22 September

South Korea	1–1	India

Seongnam Field, Seongnam

23 September

Hong Kong	1–0	Thailand

Seongnam Field, Seongnam

23 September

India	3–1	Japan

Seongnam Field, Seongnam

24 September

South Korea	8–0	Hong Kong

Seongnam Field, Seongnam

24 September

India	11–0	Thailand

Seongnam Field, Seongnam

25 September

Japan	3–1	Hong Kong

Seongnam Field, Seongnam

25 September

South Korea	10–0	Thailand

Seongnam Field, Seongnam

26 September

India	10–0	Hong Kong

Seongnam Field, Seongnam

26 September

South Korea	4–0	Japan

Seongnam Field, Seongnam

===== Group B =====
Team	Pld	W	D	L	GF	GA	GD	Pts
Malaysia	3	3	0	0	15	5	+10	6
Pakistan	3	2	0	1	20	2	+18	4
Bangladesh	3	1	0	2	3	11	−8	2
Oman	3	0	0	3	4	24	−20	0

22 September

Bangladesh	1–3	Malaysia

Seongnam Field, Seongnam

22 September

Oman	0–12	Pakistan

Seongnam Field, Seongnam

24 September

Oman	3–10	Malaysia

Seongnam Field, Seongnam

24 September

Bangladesh	0–7	Pakistan

Seongnam Field, Seongnam

26 September

Bangladesh	2–1	Oman

Seongnam Field, Seongnam

26 September

Malaysia	2–1	Pakistan

Seongnam Field, Seongnam

==== Classification 5th–8th ====
Semifinals
28 September
Japan	2
Oman	0
28 September
Bangladesh	1
Hong Kong	2

5th place match
29 September
Japan	6
Hong Kong	0
7th place match
29 September
Oman	2
Bangladesh	4

===== Semifinals =====
28 September

Japan	2–0	Oman

Seongnam Field, Seongnam

28 September

Bangladesh	1–2	Hong Kong

Seongnam Field, Seongnam

===== 7th place match =====
29 September

Oman	2–4	Bangladesh

Seongnam Field, Seongnam

===== 5th place match =====
29 September

Japan	6–0	Hong Kong

Seongnam Field, Seongnam

==== Final round ====
Semifinals
28 September
India	1
Pakistan (a.e.t.)	3
28 September
Malaysia	1
South Korea	4

Final
29 September
Pakistan	1
South Korea	2
Bronze medal match
29 September
India	4
Malaysia	1

===== Semifinals =====
28 September

India	1–3 (a.e.t.)	Pakistan

Seongnam Field, Seongnam

28 September

Malaysia	1–4	South Korea

Seongnam Field, Seongnam

===== Bronze medal match =====
29 September

India	4–1	Malaysia

Seongnam Field, Seongnam

===== Final =====
29 September

South Korea	2–1	Pakistan
Jong-ryul 35', 54'	Report	Ahmed 23'

Seongnam Field, Seongnam
Attendance: 16000

==== Final standing ====
Rank	Team	Pld	W	D	L
1st place, gold medalist(s)	South Korea	6	5	1	0
2nd place, silver medalist(s)	Pakistan	5	3	0	2
3rd place, bronze medalist(s)	India	6	4	1	1
4	Malaysia	5	3	0	2
5	Japan	6	4	0	2
6	Hong Kong	6	2	0	4
7	Bangladesh	5	2	0	3
8	Oman	5	0	0	5
9	Thailand	4	0	0	4

=== Women ===
Team	Pld	W	D	L	GF	GA	GD	Pts
South Korea	5	5	0	0	45	2	+43	10
Japan	5	3	1	1	17	3	+14	7
India	5	3	1	1	17	5	+12	7
Malaysia	5	2	0	3	8	14	−6	4
Thailand	5	1	0	4	3	23	−20	2
Hong Kong	5	0	0	5	1	44	−43	0

23 September

Japan	4–0	Thailand

Seongnam Field, Seongnam

23 September

India	2–1	Malaysia

Seongnam Field, Seongnam

23 September

South Korea	21–0	Hong Kong

Seongnam Field, Seongnam

25 September

Japan	8–0	Hong Kong

Seongnam Field, Seongnam

25 September

India	7–0	Thailand

Seongnam Field, Seongnam

25 September

South Korea	9–1	Malaysia

Seongnam Field, Seongnam

27 September

Malaysia	1–0	Thailand

Seongnam Field, Seongnam

27 September

India	7–0	Hong Kong

Seongnam Field, Seongnam

27 September

South Korea	2–1	Japan

Seongnam Field, Seongnam

28 September

Malaysia	5–0	Hong Kong

Seongnam Field, Seongnam

28 September

South Korea	10–0	Thailand

Seongnam Field, Seongnam

28 September

Japan	1–1	India

Seongnam Field, Seongnam

30 September

Thailand	3–1	Hong Kong

Seongnam Field, Seongnam

30 September

Japan	3–0	Malaysia

Seongnam Field, Seongnam

30 September

South Korea	3–0	India

Seongnam Field, Seongnam
