= Athletics at the 1983 Summer Universiade – Men's 10,000 metres =

The men's 10,000 metres event at the 1983 Summer Universiade was held at the Commonwealth Stadium in Edmonton, Canada on 5 July 1983.

The winning margin was 0.02 seconds which as of 2024 remains the narrowest winning margin for the men's 10,000 metres at these games.

== Results ==
Rank	Athlete	Nationality	Time	Notes
1st place, gold medalist(s)	Shuichi Yoneshige	Japan	28:55.37	
2nd place, silver medalist(s)	Agapius Amo	Tanzania	28:55.39	
3rd place, bronze medalist(s)	Féthi Baccouche	Tunisia	28:55.76	
4	Giovanni D'Aleo	Italy	29:01.96	
5	Paul Lockhart	Canada	29:05.31	
6	Kevin Forster	Great Britain	29:22.58	
7	Ed Eyestone	United States	29:25.17	
8	Luís Horta	Portugal	29:28.72	
9	Alessio Faustini	Italy	29:28.74	
10	Francisco Pacheco	Mexico	29:30.50	
11	Abdelali Kasbane	Morocco	30:03.60	
12	Jonathan Marshall	New Zealand	30:21.84	
13	Carlos Retiz	Mexico	30:54.44	
	Ali Hufane	Somalia	DNF	
	Johnson Nyamugasira	Uganda	DNF	
