= 2006 FIBA World Championship for Women =

Basketball championship

Campeonato Mundial de Basquetebol Feminino de 2006

Tournament details
- Host country: Brazil
- Dates: September 12–23
- Teams: 16 (from 5 confederations)
- Venues: 2 (in 2 host cities)

Final positions
- Champions: Australia (1st title)
- Runners-up: Russia
- Third place: United States
- Fourth place: Brazil

Tournament statistics
- MVP: (Australia) Penny Taylor-Gil
- Top scorer: (Australia) Lauren Jackson (21.3 points per game)

The 2006 FIBA World Championship for Women was the 15th edition of the FIBA Women's World Championship. It took place in Brazil from September 12 to September 23, 2006. It was co-organised by the International Basketball Federation (FIBA) and Confederação Brasileira de Basketball, the Brazilian national federation.

Sixteen national teams competed for the championship. Australia came away with the gold medal by beating Russia 91–74. As of 2025 the USA's semi-final loss to Russia remains their last defeat when fielding professional players.

== Venues ==
City	Venue
Barueri	Ginásio José Corrêa
São Paulo	Ginásio G.J. de Almeida ( Ibirapuera)

== Competing nations ==
Group A	Group B	Group C	Group D
Brazil	Australia	United States	Czech Republic
Spain	Lithuania	Russia	France
South Korea	Canada	China	Cuba
Argentina	Senegal	Nigeria	Chinese Taipei

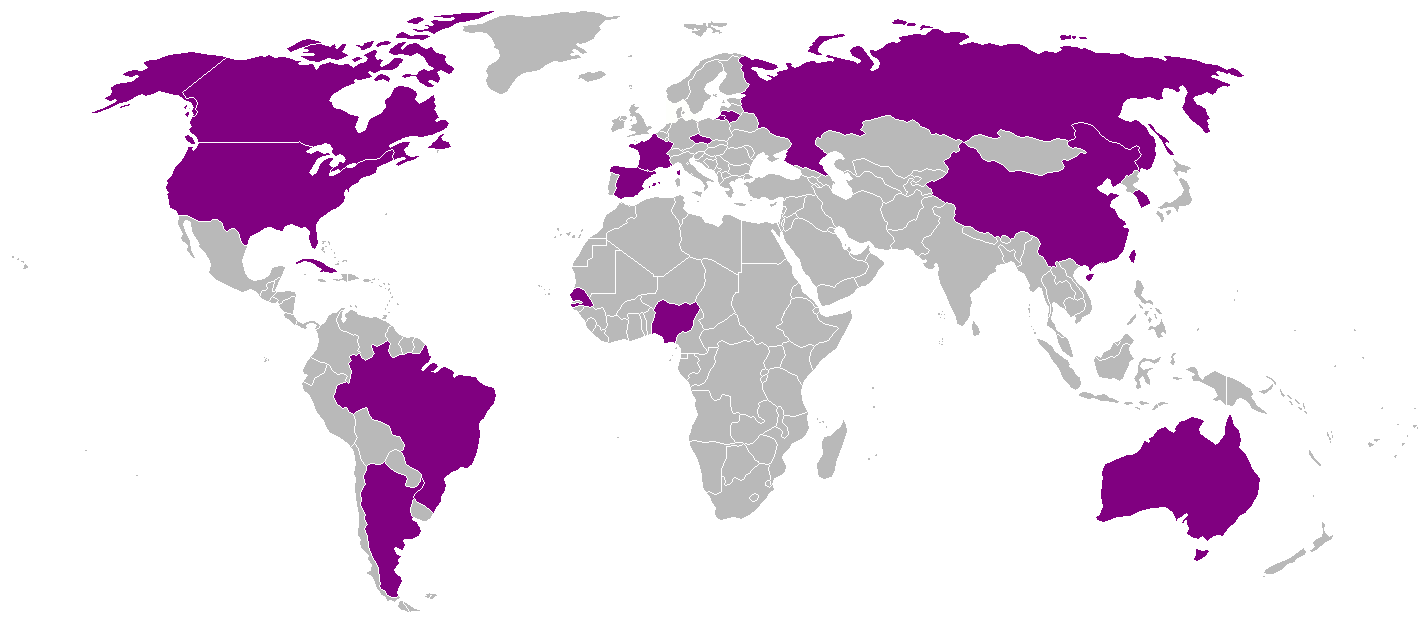
Teams qualified

Except Brazil, which automatically qualified as the host, and the United States, which automatically qualified as the reigning Olympic champion, the 14 remaining countries qualified through their continents’ qualifying tournaments:

- FIBA Europe – Spain, France, Lithuania, Czech Republic (European Champion), Russia
- FIBA Americas – Brazil (host), United States (Olympic Champion), Canada, Argentina, Cuba
- FIBA Africa – Nigeria, Senegal
- FIBA Asia – P.R. of China, Chinese Taipei (or Taiwan or Republic of China), Korea
- FIBA Oceania – Australia (Oceanian Champion)

== Squads ==
At the start of tournament, all 16 participating countries each had 12 players on their roster.

== Referees ==
For the World Championship for Women, FIBA selected 25 professional referees:

- Andersson, Karolina
- Avanessian, Heros
- Baum Spalter, Gabriel Chiel
- Blauch, Susan Elaine
- Boltauzer, Matej
- Chernova, Elena
- Conde, Antonio
- Crowley, Nadiene Renée
- da Silva, Fátima Aparecida
- Dolinek, Ivo
- Etheir, Nancy
- Gode, Vitalis Odhiambo
- Ho, Kok Yew
- Julien, Chantal
- Leemann, Philippe
- Lefwerth, Oscar
- Mayberry, Vaughan Charles
- Pacheco, Sérgio de Jesus
- Pilipauskas, Kestutis
- Peng, Ling
- Rougier, Diego Hernan
- Schaer Araya, Gabriela
- Smith, Roberto Omar
- Touré, Moussa Ismaïla
- Varghese, Gens Vadayattu

== Preliminary round ==
- The three best squads of each group qualify for second round.

Group A (São Paulo)
	Team	Pts	W	L	PF	PA	Diff
1	Argentina	5	2	1	219	199	+20
2	Brazil	5	2	1	243	222	+21
3	Spain	5	2	1	218	200	+18
4	Korea	3	0	3	207	266	−59

Tue Sept. 12 13:00	Korea	57	87	Spain
Tue Sept. 12 15:15	Argentina	69	71	Brazil
Wed Sept. 13 13:00	Spain	64	77	Argentina
Wed Sept. 13 15:15	Brazil	106	86	Korea
Thu Sept. 14 13:00	Korea	64	73	Argentina
Thu Sept. 14 15:15	Brazil	66	67	Spain

Group B (São Paulo)
	Team	Pts	W	L	PF	PA	Diff
1	Australia	6	3	0	194	120	+74
2	Lithuania	5	2	1	158	123	+35
3	Canada	4	1	2	188	245	−57
4	Senegal	3	0	3	182	234	−52

Tue Sept. 12 17:30	Lithuania	0	2	Australia
Tue Sept. 12 19:45	Senegal	64	65	Canada
Wed Sept. 13 17:30	Canada	58	84	Lithuania
Wed Sept. 13 19:45	Australia	95	55	Senegal
Thu Sept. 14 17:30	Lithuania	74	63	Senegal
Thu Sept. 14 19:45	Canada	65	97	Australia

Group C (Barueri)
	Team	Pts	W	L	PF	PA	Diff
1	United States	6	3	0	288	198	+90
2	Russia	5	2	1	250	206	+44
3	China	4	1	2	209	264	−55
4	Nigeria	3	0	3	155	234	−79

Tue Sept. 12 15:15	Russia	84	50	Nigeria
Tue Sept. 12 19:45	United States	119	72	China
Wed Sept. 13 15:15	China	66	86	Russia
Wed Sept. 13 19:45	Nigeria	46	79	United States
Thu Sept. 14 17:30	United States	90	80	Russia
Thu Sept. 14 19:45	Nigeria	59	71	China

Group D (Barueri)
	Team	Pts	W	L	PF	PA	Diff
1	Czech Republic	5	2	1	224	185	+39
2	France	5	2	1	235	204	+31
3	Cuba	5	2	1	204	216	−12
4	Chinese Taipei	3	0	3	210	268	−58

Tue Sept. 12 13:00	France	62	58	Czech Republic
Tue Sept. 12 17:30	Cuba	75	70	Chinese Taipei
Wed Sept. 13 13:00	Chinese Taipei	68	100	France
Wed Sept. 13 17:30	Czech Republic	73	51	Cuba
Thu Sept. 14 13:00	Chinese Taipei	72	93	Czech Republic
Thu Sept. 14 15:15	France	73	78	Cuba

Legend: Pts: classification points (game won is 2 pts, game lost is 1), W: games won, L: game lost, PF : points scored, PC: points against, Diff.: difference; in green the squads qualified for eighth-final round.

== Eighth-final round ==
- The four best squads of each group qualify for quarter-finals. All Preliminary Round games played by teams qualifying for the Eighth-finals carry over into the Eighth-final standings.

Group E (São Paulo)
	Team	Pts	W	L	PF	PA	Diff
1	Australia	12	6	0	431	310	+121
2	Spain	10	4	2	446	384	+62
3	Brazil	10	4	2	482	412	+70
4	Lithuania	9	3	3	342	329	+13
5	Argentina	9	3	3	377	402	−25
6	Canada	7	1	5	344	474	−130

Group F (Barueri)
	Team	Pts	W	L	PF	PA	Diff
1	United States	12	6	0	517	339	+178
2	Czech Republic	10	4	2	438	404	+34
3	Russia	9	3	3	493	446	+47
4	France	9	3	3	414	410	+4
5	China	9	3	3	421	477	−56
6	Cuba	8	2	4	405	475	−70

Sat Sept. 16 09:30	Argentina	62	58	Canada
Sat Sept. 16 14:00	Brazil	84	67	Lithuania
Sat Sept. 16 16:15	Australia	72	68	Spain
Sun Sept. 17 09:30	Argentina	47	62	Lithuania
Sun Sept. 17 14:00	Spain	85	57	Canada
Sun Sept. 17 16:15	Australia	82	73	Brazil
Mon Sept. 18 13:00	Lithuania	55	75	Spain
Mon Sept. 18 15:15	Argentina	49	83	Australia
Mon Sept. 18 17:30	Brazil	82	41	Canada

Sat Sept. 16 11:45	Russia	64	74	France
Sat Sept. 16 14:00	Czech Republic	79	73	China
Sat Sept. 16 16:15	United States	90	50	Cuba
Sun Sept. 17 11:45	Czech Republic	85	83	Russia
Sun Sept. 17 14:00	China	73	70	Cuba
Sun Sept. 17 16:15	United States	76	41	France
Mon Sept. 18 15:15	Russia	96	81	Cuba
Mon Sept. 18 17:30	France	64	66	China
Mon Sept. 18 19:45	United States	63	50	Czech Republic

== Knockout Stage (São Paulo) ==
All times local (UTC −2)

Quarter-finals
September 20, 2006 – 17:30
Australia	79
France	66
September 20, 2006 – 15:15
Czech Republic	51
Brazil	75
September 20, 2006 – 13:00
Spain	56
Russia	60
September 20, 2006 – 19:45
United States	90
Lithuania	56

Semi-finals
September 21, 2006 – 15:15
Australia	88
Brazil	76
September 21, 2006 – 19:45
Russia	75
United States	68

Final
September 23, 2006 – 14:00
Australia	91
Russia	74
Third place
September 23, 2006 – 9:30
Brazil	59
United States	99

=== 5th through 8th place ===
Classification round
September 21, 2006 – 13:00
France (OT)	79
Czech Republic	78
September 21, 2006 – 17:30
Spain	71
Lithuania	80

Fifth place
September 22, 2006 – 17:30
France	79
Lithuania	73
Seventh place
September 22, 2006 – 15:15
Czech Republic	57
Spain	49

=== 9th through 12th place ===
Classification round
September 20, 2006 – 19:45
China	61
Canada	65
September 20, 2006 – 17:30
Argentina	76
Cuba	73

Ninth place
September 21, 2006 – 19:45
Canada	57
Argentina	74
Eleventh place
September 21, 2006 – 17:30
China	68
Cuba	71

=== 13th through 16th place ===
Classification round
September 16, 2006 – 09:30
Chinese Taipei	81
Nigeria	77
September 16, 2006 – 16:15
(South Korea) Korea	75
Senegal	69

Thirteenth place
September 17, 2006 – 16:15
Chinese Taipei	52
(South Korea) Korea	73
Fifteenth place
September 17, 2006 – 09:30
Nigeria	64
Senegal	66

== Awards ==
2006 FIBA Women's World champions

Australia
First title

Most Valuable Player
(Australia) Penny Taylor-Gil

== Final standings ==
#	Team	W-L
	Australia	9–0
	Russia	5–4
	United States	8–1
4	Brazil	5–4
5	France	5–4
6	Lithuania	4–5
7	Czech Republic	5–4
8	Spain	4–5
9	Argentina	5–3
10	Canada	2–6
11	Cuba	3–5
12	China	3–5
13	South Korea	2–3
14	Chinese Taipei	1–4
15	Senegal	1–4
16	Nigeria	0–5
