= Kim Yun-ho =

Kim Yun-ho or Kim Yoon-ho may refer to:

- Kim Yun-ho (footballer), South Korean footballer
- Shaun (musician), South Korean singer
- Kim Yoon-ho (basketball), South Korean basketball player
