= Telesphore Dusabe =

Rwandan long-distance runner

Personal information
- Nationality: Rwandan
- Born: 15 May 1965 (age 61)

Sport
- Sport: Long-distance running
- Event: Marathon

Telesphore Dusabe (born 15 May 1965) is a Rwandan long-distance runner. He competed in the men's marathon at the 1988 Summer Olympics.
