= Abbas Mohamed =

Nigerian long-distance runner

Personal information
- Nationality: Nigerian
- Born: 27 October 1963 (age 62)

Sport
- Sport: Long-distance running
- Event: Marathon

Abbas Mohamed (born 27 October 1963) is a Nigerian long-distance runner. He competed in the men's marathon at the 1988 Summer Olympics.
