= Sung Jung-a =

South Korean basketball player

- Hangul: 성정아
- Hanja: 成貞兒
- RR: Seong Jeonga
- MR: Sŏng Chŏnga

Sung Jung-a
Medal record

Women's basketball

Representing South Korea

Olympic Games
Silver medal – second place	1984 Los Angeles	National team

Asian Games
Gold medal – first place	1990 Beijing	National team
Silver medal – second place	1982 New Delhi	National team
Silver medal – second place	1986 Seoul	National team

FIBA Asia Championship
Gold medal – first place	1984 Shanghai	National team
Gold medal – first place	1988 Hong Kong	National team
Silver medal – second place	1986 Kuala Lumpur	National team
Silver medal – second place	1990 Singapore	National team

FIBA U19 World Championship
Silver medal – second place	1985 Colorado Springs	National team

Sung Jung-A (born 25 December 1965) is a South Korean former basketball player who won the silver medal in the women's basketball tournament at the 1984 Summer Olympics.

Sung was also a member of the South Korean junior national basketball team that won the silver medal at the inaugural FIBA Under-19 World Championship for Women in 1985.

Sung also competed in 1988 Summer Olympics where South Korea finished 7th with a record of 2–3.

== Personal life ==
Her son, Lee Hyun-jung is a South Korean college basketball player for the Davidson Wildcats of the Atlantic 10 Conference.
