= Heun =

Heun is a German surname. Notable people with the surname include:

- Conor Heun (born 1979), American mixed martial artist
- Carl Heun, (1771–1854), German author, better known by his pseudonym Heinrich Clauren
- Dirk Heun (born 1953), German footballer
- Dustin Heun (born 1984), German footballer
- Jürgen Heun (born 1958), East German footballer
- Karl Heun (1859–1929), German mathematician
- Wilhelm Heun (1895–1986), German Wehrmacht general
- John Heun, (born 1974), American Human Resources Executive

== See also ==
- Heun, Nebraska
