= Tikken Singh =

Indian field hockey player

Personal information
- Nationality: Indian
- Born: Manipur, India

Sport
- Sport: Field hockey
Medal record
Representing India
Men's field hockey
Asian Games
| Bronze medal – third place | 1986 Seoul | Team |

Tikken Singh is an Indian field hockey player. He competed at the 1986 Asian Games in Seoul, where the Indian team won the bronze medal. He is from the state of Manipur.
