= Benjamin Longiros =

Ugandan long-distance runner

Personal information
- Nationality: Ugandan
- Born: 3 March 1963 (age 63)

Sport
- Sport: Long-distance running
- Event: Marathon

Benjamin Longiros (born 3 March 1963) is a Ugandan long-distance runner. He competed in the men's marathon at the 1988 Summer Olympics.
