= Noureddine Sobhi =

Moroccan long-distance runner

Personal information
- Nationality: Moroccan
- Born: 27 June 1962 (age 64)

Sport
- Sport: Long-distance running
- Event: Marathon

Noureddine Sobhi (born 27 June 1962) is a Moroccan long-distance runner. He competed in the men's marathon at the 1988 Summer Olympics.
