= Juan Amores =

Costa Rican long-distance runner

Personal information
- Full name: Juan Diego de la Trinidad Amores Arias
- Born: 25 October 1963 San Ramón, Costa Rica
- Died: 28 August 2015 (aged 51) U.S.

Sport
- Sport: Long-distance running
- Event: Marathon

Juan Diego de la Trinidad Amores Arias (25 October 1963 – 28 August 2015) was a Costa Rican long-distance runner. He competed in the men's marathon at the 1988 Summer Olympics.
