= Rajinder Singh Rawat =

Indian field hockey player (born 1964)

Personal information
- Nationality: Indian
- Born: 30 January 1964 (age 62)

Sport
- Sport: Field hockey
Medal record
Representing India
Men's field hockey
Asian Games
Bronze medal – third place	1986 Seoul	Team

Rajinder Singh Rawat (born 30 January 1964) is an Indian field hockey player. He competed in the men's tournament at the 1988 Summer Olympics. He was from Uttarakhand.
