= Nasser Babapour =

Iranian long-distance runner

Personal information
- Nationality: Iranian
- Born: 6 November 1957 (age 67)

Sport
- Sport: Long-distance running
- Event: Marathon

Nasser Babapour (Persian: ناصر باباپور; born 6 November 1957) is an Iranian long-distance runner. He competed in the men's marathon at the 1988 Summer Olympics.

At the 1988 Olympics, Babapour ran 3:00:20 hours to place 93rd. He was Iran's first-ever Olympic marathon runner.

The 2018 East Azerbaijan Cross Country Championships were held in Babapour's honour. At the competition, Babapour's domestic and international achievements were recognized.
