= Yohanna Waziri =

Nigerian long-distance runner

Personal information
- Nationality: Nigerian
- Born: 1 October 1964 (age 61)

Sport
- Sport: Long-distance running
- Event: Marathon

Yohanna Waziri (born 1 October 1964 or 1960) is a Nigerian long-distance runner. He competed in the men's marathon at the 1988 Summer Olympics.
