= Nguyễn Văn Thuyết =

Vietnamese long-distance runner

Personal information
- Nationality: Vietnamese
- Born: 10 January 1956 Lý Nhân, Hà Nam, Vietnam
- Died: 12 February 2025 (aged 69) Nam Định, Vietnam
- Children: 5

Sport
- Sport: Long-distance running
- Event: Marathon

Nguyễn Văn Thuyết (10 January 1956 – 12 February 2025) was a Vietnamese long-distance runner.

== Early life and career ==
Nguyễn Văn Thuyết was born on 10 January 1956, in Lý Nhân, Hà Nam.

He competed in the men's marathon at the 1988 Summer Olympics.

He retired in 1990. Later, he worked as a track and field athlete trainer.

== Death ==
Nguyễn Văn Thuyết died at the morning on 12 February 2025 (aged 69), after a period of illness.

== Personal life ==
Prior to his death, he lived in Nam Định city. He had five daughters. He was also an enthusiastic supporter of Thep Xanh Nam Dinh FC, having become a football-support drummer for about 30 years.
