= Ricardo Taitano =

Guam long-distance runner

Personal information
- Nationality: Guam
- Born: August 1957 (age 68)

Sport
- Sport: Long-distance running
- Event: Marathon

Ricardo Taitano (born August 1957) is a Guam long-distance runner. He competed in the men's marathon at the 1988 Summer Olympics.
