= Lee Hyung-sook =

South Korean basketball player (born 1964)

- Hangul: 이형숙
- RR: I Hyeongsuk
- MR: I Hyŏngsuk

Lee Hyung-sook
Medal record

Women's basketball

Representing South Korea

Olympic Games
Silver medal – second place	1984 Los Angeles	National team

Asian Games
Gold medal – first place	1990 Beijing	National team
Silver medal – second place	1986 Seoul	National team

FIBA Asia Championship
Gold medal – first place	1984 Shanghai	National team
Gold medal – first place	1988 Hong Kong	National team
Silver medal – second place	1986 Kuala Lumpur	National team
Silver medal – second place	1990 Singapore	National team

Lee Hyung-Sook (born 24 December 1964) is a South Korean former basketball player who competed in the 1984 Summer Olympics and in the 1988 Summer Olympics. She went on to work for Hankook Cosmetics, and then in 1992 quit that position to move to Taiwan and coach girls' high school basketball there. As of 2006, she worked at Pu-Men High School in Kaohsiung.
