= Fred Schumann =

Guam long-distance runner

Personal information
- Nationality: Guam
- Born: 9 August 1959 (age 66)

Sport
- Sport: Long-distance running
- Event: Marathon

Fred Schumann (born 9 August 1959) is a Guam long-distance runner. He competed in the men's marathon at the 1988 Summer Olympics.
