= Huh Sang-young =

South Korean hockey player

Personal information
- Nationality: South Korean
- Born: 1 March 1967 (age 59)

Sport
- Sport: Field hockey
Medal record
Men's field hockey
Representing South Korea
Asian Games
Gold medal – first place	1986 Seongnam	Team

Korean name
- Hangul: 허상영
- RR: Heo Sangyeong
- MR: Hŏ Sangyŏng

Huh Sang-young (born 1 March 1967) is a South Korean field hockey coach of the South Korean women's national team.

He competed in the men's tournament at the 1988 Summer Olympics.

He coached the team at the 2018 Women's Hockey World Cup.
