= Yun Jeong-hye =

South Korean volleyball player (born 1966)

Personal information
- Nationality: South Korean
- Born: 18 May 1966 (age 58)

Sport
- Sport: Volleyball

Yun Jeong-hye (born 18 May 1966) is a South Korean volleyball player. She competed at the 1984 Summer Olympics and the 1988 Summer Olympics.
