= Jeong Bu-jin =

South Korean hockey player

Personal information
- Nationality: South Korean
- Born: 16 May 1963 (age 63)

Sport
- Sport: Field hockey
Medal record
Men's field hockey
Representing South Korea
Asian Games
Gold medal – first place	1986 Seongnam	Team

Jeong Bu-jin (born 16 May 1963) is a South Korean field hockey player. He competed in the men's tournament at the 1988 Summer Olympics, receiving 10th place in Men's Hockey.
