= Lee Jae-su =

South Korean swimmer

Personal information
- Born: 8 March 1968 (age 58)

Sport
- Sport: Swimming

Lee Jae-su (born 8 March 1968) is a South Korean swimmer. He competed in two events at the 1988 Summer Olympics.
