= Sun Mi-sook =

South Korean volleyball player (born 1968)

Personal information
- Nationality: South Korean
- Born: 19 March 1968 (age 58)

Korean name
- Hangul: 선미숙
- RR: Seon Misuk
- MR: Sŏn Misuk

Sport
- Sport: Volleyball

Sun Mi-sook (Korean: 선미숙; born 19 March 1968) is a South Korean volleyball player. She competed in the women's tournament at the 1988 Summer Olympics.
