= Lee Myeong-hak =

South Korean volleyball player (born 1967)

Personal information
- Nationality: South Korean
- Born: 15 January 1967 (age 59)

Sport
- Sport: Volleyball

Lee Myeong-hak (born 15 January 1967) is a South Korean volleyball player. He competed in the men's tournament at the 1988 Summer Olympics.
