= Kim Kui-soon =

South Korean volleyball player (born 1968)

Personal information
- Nationality: South Korean
- Born: 5 November 1968 (age 57)

Sport
- Sport: Volleyball

Kim Kui-soon (born 5 November 1968) is a South Korean volleyball player. She competed in the women's tournament at the 1988 Summer Olympics.
