= Yu Yeong-mi =

South Korean volleyball player (born 1967)

Personal information
- Nationality: South Korean
- Born: 9 February 1967 (age 58)

Sport
- Sport: Volleyball

Yu Yeong-mi (born 9 February 1967) is a South Korean volleyball player. She competed in the women's tournament at the 1988 Summer Olympics.
