= Kwon Jung Ho =

South Korean Artist

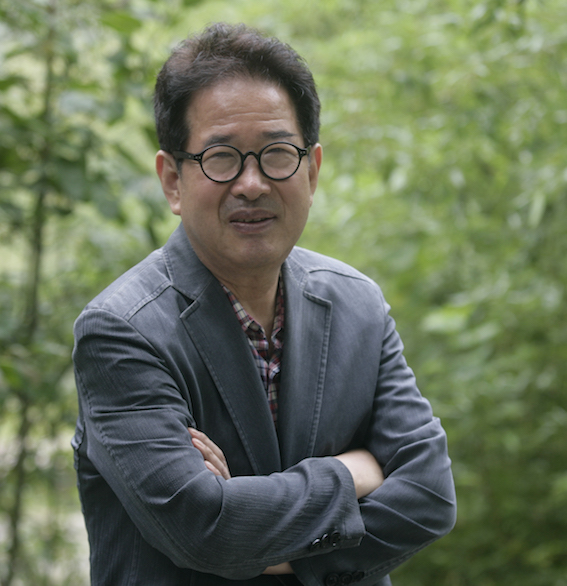
- Kwon Jung Ho who continues to work as a prominent art administrator and artist based in Daegu.
- Born: 1944 (age 81–82); Chilgok, South Korea
- Citizenship: South Korea
- Education: Keimyung University; Pratt Institute
- Known for: Painting, Sculpture

Korean name
- Hangul: 권정호
- Hanja: 權正浩
- RR: Gwon Jeongho
- MR: Kwŏn Chŏngho

Kwon Jung Ho (Korean: 권정호), also stylised as kwonjungho and Kwon Jungho, is a South Korean artist, sculptor, and educator based in Daegu, South Korea. Kwon was influenced by Abstract Expressionism, Neo-Expressionism, and Post-Modernism movements. A majority of artworks in the oeuvre take the shape of the skeleton that reflects the artist's interest in the subject matters of life and death inspired by his physician father from a childhood memory. The pivotal artworks consist of monochrome paintings, dot series, sound series, skeleton series that embrace flat painting and installation, and conception and abstraction.

== Life and education ==
The son of a physician, Kwon Jung Ho was born in Chilgok, located in Gyeongsangbuk-do Province, on April 28, 1944. Kwon, born on the verge of the Korea's liberation, grew up in times of social turmoil. In 1950, he enrolled at Suchang Elementary School, but the same year, he fled to Miryang (Yeonjeong) for refuge to escape the Korean War. After graduating from Jongno National School in 1956, from 1959 to 1963, he attended Gyeseong High School where he learned photography from the photography class taught by Kim Tae Han and Her Jong Jeong; nevertheless, Kwon did not aspire to become an artist at that time. After being rejected by a medical college, he entered the Civil and Architecture department at Chunggu University in 1964 for its high value on socially useful work. However, in 1965, Kwon transferred to the Arts and Crafts department at Keimyung University to pursue studies as an art student. He attended lectures by sculptor Nam Chul, craftsman Kim Gwang-Hyun, and painter Seo Seok Gyu. In 1972, Kwon became an apprentice of Professor Jung Joem Sik and calligrapher Seo Dong Gyun who greatly influenced his early works, and the same year, Kwon graduated from the university. In 1975, he married his current wife and had one child. After completing the master's degree in Art Education at Keimyung University from 1973 to 1982, he moved to New York to further his studies in Fine Art at the Pratt Institute, where he obtained a master's degree under the tutelage of Professor Corinne Robbins and Kelvin Albert from 1983 to 1986.

== Career ==
In 1972, Kwon embarked on his career as an art educator at Gyeongan Middle School in Andong, Oseong High School in Daegu, and Gyeongmyeong Girls' Middle School. With his career background as a lecturer at Hyosung Women's University, Keimyung College, Hansa Technical College, and Shinil College, in 1982, Kwon was appointed as a professor at Daegu University where he worked until 2009. From 1996 to 1999, he served as the president of the Korean Art Association of Daegu Metropolitan City, the vice-president of the Korean Art Association, and the national branch president. In 1997, Kwon and 24 other members who endorsed the local art, academia, press, and cultural community reinforced the Daegu Art Museum construction committee's establishment by implementing a petition and fundraising exhibition to support the museum establishment. From 2002 to 2006, he served as the president of the Korea Federation of Art and Culture Association of Daegu Metropolitan. In 2022, Kwon has been selected as an artist for the Daegu Senior Artist Oral Record Archive and in 2024 he establish his own art museum, "Kwonjungho Art Museum" in Daegu which is the first private Art museum in Daegu. To this day, Kwon continues to work as a prominent arts administrator and artist.

== Art ==
=== From the 1970s to 1980s ===
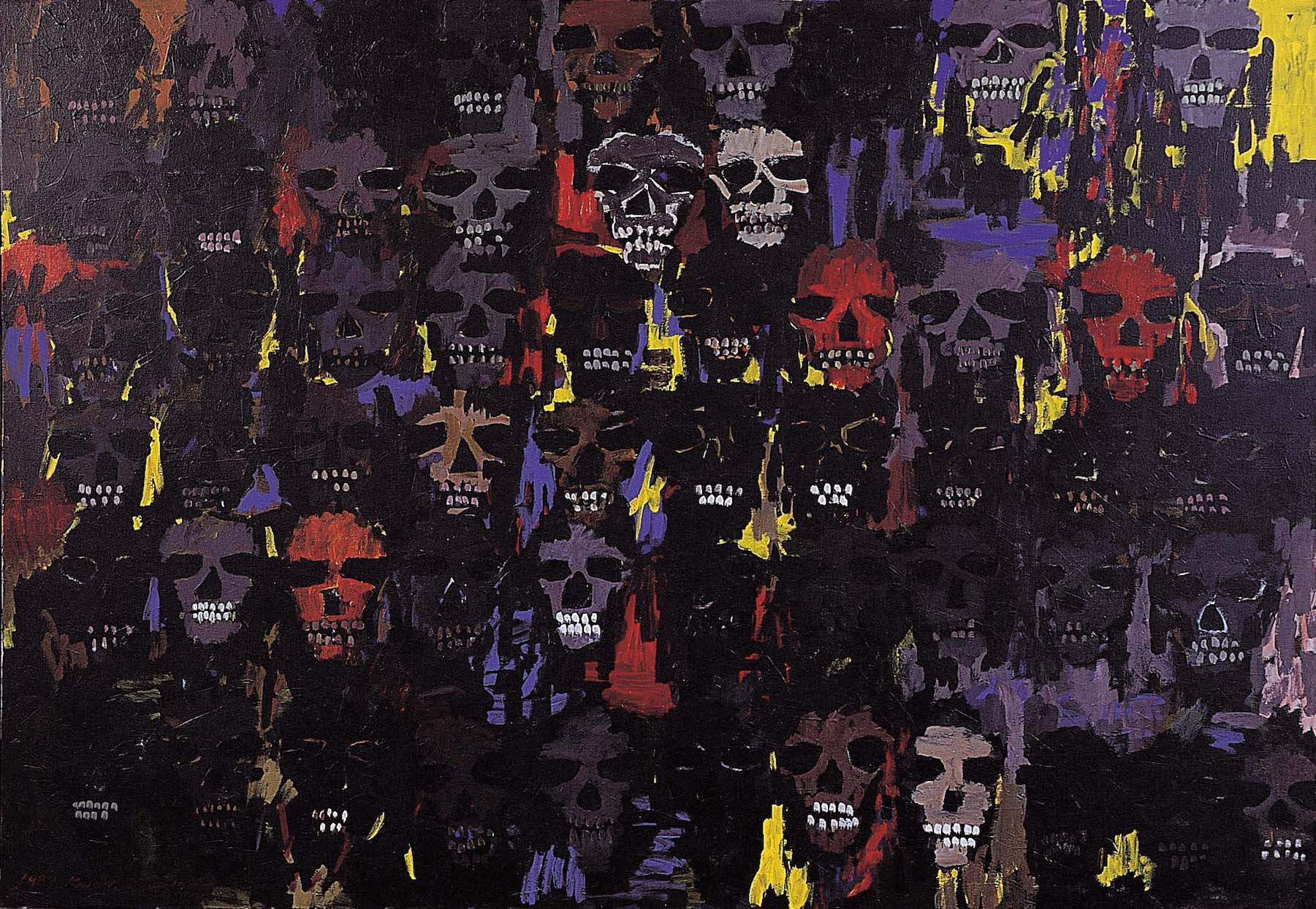
One of Kwon Jung Ho's Skeleton Series from MMCA Collection

After completing his military service in 1969, Kwon returned to school with a great interest in abstract art. In the early 1970s, he started his career as an artist at the Cungmok-Hoe founded in 1971, Ijjip-Hoe, and Sinjo-Hoe. Influenced by his mentor Professor Jung Jeon Sik and sculptor Nam Gwan, Kwon mostly created abstract works consist of characters and dots. During this period, he was exposed to artworks by popular foreign artists such as Duchamp and Jasper Jones in Japanese and American magazines and books brought in by the USIS. Amidst the tumultuous years of the inflow of new culture, Kwon also endeavored to discover the essence of art. He created the dots series by drawing and attaching dots in the shapes of holes on changhoji, traditional Korean paper used for doors and windows. In the later period, Kwon stated that his life and culture inspired the dots in his early works. During earlier periods, his interest in Informal abstraction shifted to characters for form and then dots, lines, and planes. In the 1980s, he attempted a conceptual approach towards his artistic practice. As the first attempt, Kwon created 'A Fool's Plastering' in 1981 that embodies the criticism for the absence of history and conceptual meaning in the Korean contemporary art in which the Western art trends prevalently influenced the minimal and monochrome painting styles.

=== From the 1980s to 1990s ===
When Neo-Expressionism and Post-Modernism emerged in the 1980s as powerful movements after Abstract Expressionism, Kwon explored his cultural background and sought the legitimacy of his work. He developed the research on the connection of visceral expression with the oriental spirit rather than a meticulous depiction. Inspired by a discarded speaker on the street, he created sound series that encompassed his reality, and restless and exhausted modern people expressed through the speaker-formed object, quick brushstrokes, and vivid primary colors.

In the late 1980s, his work extended from the sound to the skeleton, which was initially used to reveal repugnance toward social inhibition. Kwon created works deeply infused with social malaise and agony in the ordeals of a tumultuous period during the war and transitional society based on the subjects matters of 'incident,' 'night,' 'anger,' 'fear,' and 'death.' In the 1990s, he developed his style of expression by employing bold colors and intense lines.

=== From the 1990s to 2000s ===
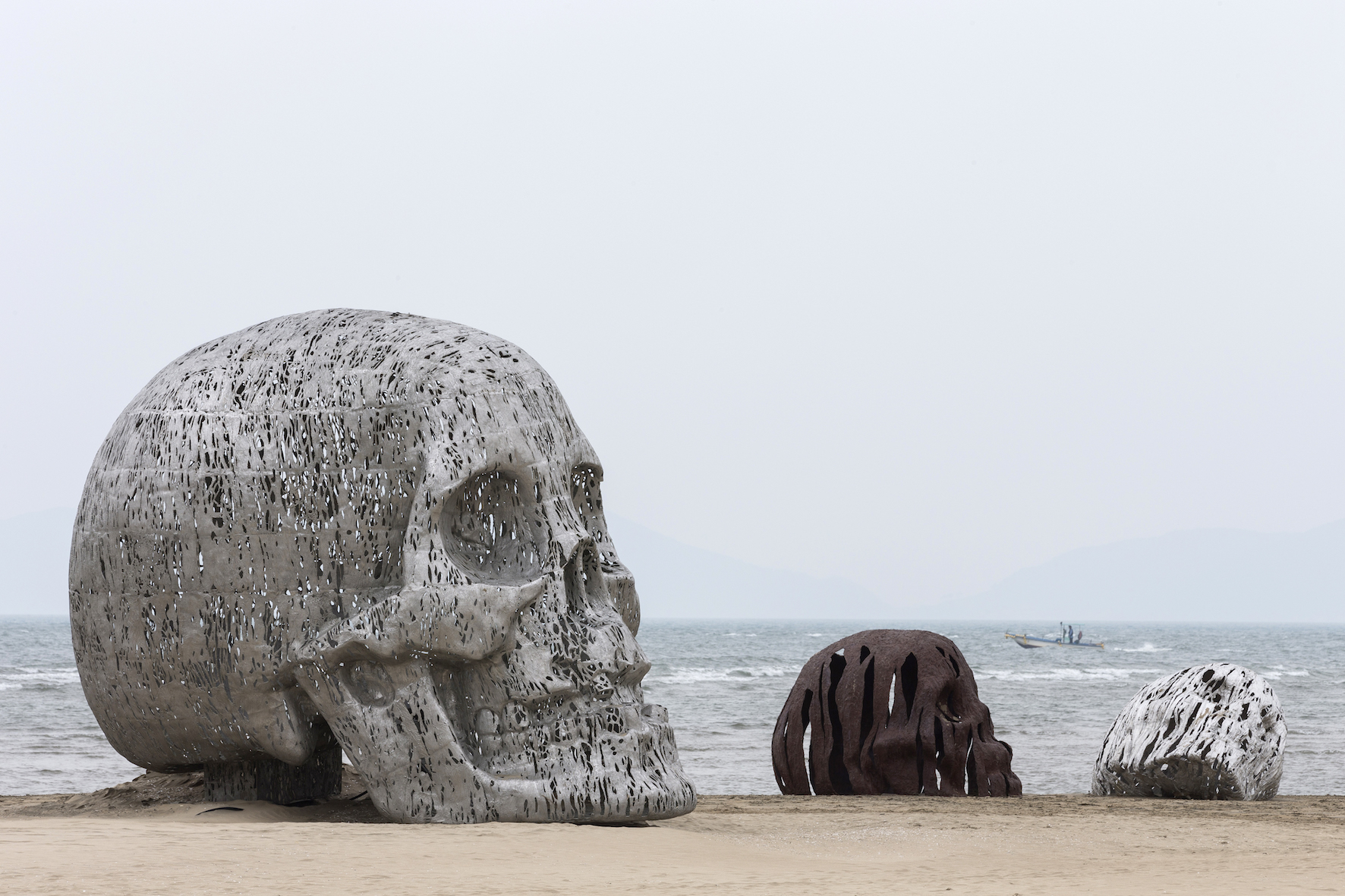
Mirror of time by Kwon Jung Ho at 2017 Busan Biennale

In the 1990s, Kwon began to use lines as a distinct expression measure in his works. During this time, the skeleton was depicted with disassembled lines that capture the stream of emotion, consciousness, and energy. The line series Kwon created in the mid-1990s consisted of dynamic streams of lines and a remarkable brushstroke of the line stretched beyond its mere appearance as a line. The lines in his later works demonstrated his attempt to recognize and express cultural identity. In the 2000s, Kwon often used lines that engage objective expressions like figures, everyday scenes, still life, and landscape.

=== From the 2000s to 2010s ===
The real-life events influenced Kwon's works in the 2000s. His concern for social issues since his time abroad profoundly enriched and manifested onto the canvas upon the 'Sangin gas explosion' in Daegu in 1995. During this time, he created simple and abstract lines that involve the narratives of the solitude of everyday life infused in public places like the train station, airport, and central city in Daegu, where people gather to take a trip.

Kwon himself was utterly devastated when he lost friends and his disciples from the '2.18 Daegu subway accident' in 2003. He was determined to create 'subway series' to keep a social testimony and record of the incident through his work. In the series, Kwon recorded the disastrous accident scene, infuriated the public, responsible people, the protest, and religion in memorial. He devised and incorporated the paper to contemplate the true image of the accident. Through his careful observation and empathy, Kwon envisioned revealing the reality of society and convey consolation to the local community in distress. Later, he expanded his concerns to social problems such as a rise in the unemployment rate and overflowing individualism.

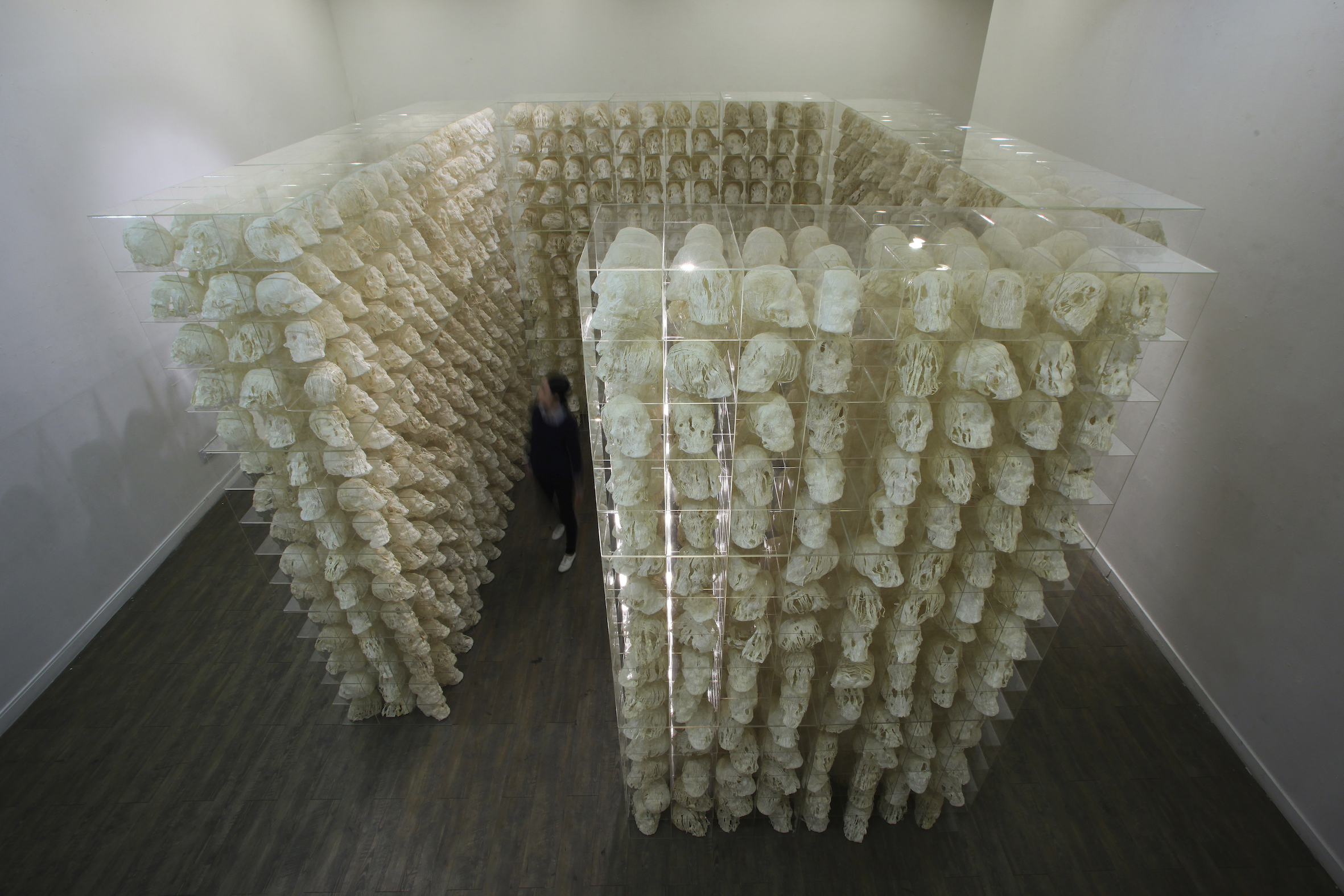
Kwon Jung Ho's dakpaper skeletons installation work, <Gate through the future>, Daegu Art Museum Collection

In the extension of these concerns, <Gate through the future> was presented in 2013 and Hong Soon Whan, director of Kunstdoc Gallery, described the work as such:

"Kwon has made more than 2300 Dakpaper skulls. Repetition of formation based on handcraft has important meaning that it reminds of process and cycle of death. It is repeated endlessly, but it is just describing the form of death related to the world as an image, not trying to explain the death itself or to supplement the loss of subject. It repeats existential questions repeatedly. So this process of making skulls through complicate process creates skull as an image of death, but the image itself is not a goal but just a kind of carrying out of consideration on existence."

== Collections ==
=== In Korea ===
- National Museum of Modern and Contemporary Art, Korea - 'Sound III', 'One Day Night', 'Skelectons 87', 1997
- National Museum of Modern and Contemporary Art, Art Bank, Korea – Suzhou, China
- Daegu Art Museum, Daegu - ①'Golgotha 5' 2013, ②'The Gate Through the Future' 2010, ③'Humanbeings want to blame others for their mistakes' 2009, ③'Humans want to blame others for their mistakes' 2009, ④'Daegu Subway Accident' 2006, ⑤'Sky' 1991, ⑥'American Education' 2000, ⑦'97 from the line' 1997, ⑧'A Happiness of Death' 1996, ⑨'Humanbeings...' 1994, ⑩'Skelectons' 1989–1991, ⑪'Skelectons 87-1' 1987, ⑫'Skelectons' 1985, ⑬'Three Skelectons 85' 1985, ⑭'Accident' 1984, ⑮'Sound 85' 1985, ⑯'Composition 84-1' 1984, ⑰'a Fool's Grooming' 1982, ⑱'Point 80-7' 1979, ⑲'The Beginning 77-2' 1977, ⑳'An Old Castle' 1971, ㉑'Self Portrait-84' 1984
- Busan Museum of Art, Busan - 'What do humans become and where do they go?' 1991
- Cyan Museum of Art, Yeongcheon City, Province of Gyeongsangbuk-do – The Mirror of Time, 2014
- Chuncheon Animation Museum, Chuncheon City – 'Mirror of Time 6', 'Aspiration2018 – A Song Dedicated to Flower', 2018
- Daegu Arts Center Art Museum, Daegu - 'Sound 85-5', 1985, 'Premonition', 1995, 'Cave', 1991
- Korean Museum of Buddhist Art, 'Flower', 2007
- Daegu University Museum, 'Still life', 2002
- Daegu City Hall, 'An Afternoon Nap', 2002
- Dabaek-Plaza Department Store, 'Breath – Sky', 1997
- Health College of Health Science, Daegu 'Where are we headed for?', 2009
- Kimdaegun Cathoric Church, 'Pascha' and other works, 2009
- Daegu Opera House - 'Relationship', 2005
- BULKWANGSA, Seoul - 'Buddha', 2009

=== Overseas ===
- Murray State University, Murray, USA
- Shanghai City Hall, Shanghai, China 'Image of Shanghai-1', 'Image of Shanghai-2', 2002
- Art Summit Foundation, Ravindra Munch, Jaipur, India - 'What do humans become...'(2017)

== Exhibitions ==
Recent Solo Exhibitions

2019

- Kwon Jeong-ho retrospect Exhibition(1971–2018), Art &culture Center, no.1.2, Daegu
- 1985 NY, Artcenter of Bongsan, Daegu
- Kwon Jeong-ho, Shirota gallery, Tokyo, Japan

2017

- Kwon Jeong-ho, Koskun "The noble space and noble flow", Suseong Artpia, Daegu

2015

- KWON JUNG-HO "GokSin", O'sGallery, Wanjoo

2014

- KWON JUNG-HO Photo Show "Shifted Time", DAEGU PHOTO BIENNALE, SPACE129, Daegu

2013

- KWON JUNG-HO "The Mirror of Death Shining on a Life", Cyan Museum, Youngchun
- Invited show of KWON JUNG-HO, Gallery KUNSTDOC, Seoul
- Invited show of KWON JUNG-HO, Gallery SOHEON, CONTEMPORARY, Daegu

2024

- Paradised : Paradise died, Opening Exhibition of Kwonjungho Art Museum, Daegu, Korea

Recent Group Exhibitions

2023

- Project Border ONSAEMIRO 2023, Dalseo Arts Center, Daegu
- 2023 INTERNATIONAL EXCHANGE EXHIBITION, Daegu University, Daegu

2022

- From the Collection of Daegu Art Museum, A Season of Meditation, Daegu Art Museum, Daegu
- 2022 Waegwan International Contemporary Art Festival, Galler Omoke, Daegu

2021

- Archive Exhibition Commemorating The 10th Anniversary of The Opening of The Daegu Art Museum, THE FIRST DECADE, Daegu Art Museum, Daegu
- 2021 Exhibition of Literary Civilization, Seongsan Art Hall, Changwon
- Revisiting Daegu, The Abstract Art 50th Anniversary of Shin Jeo Art Association, History of Daegu Art Progress, Daegu Culture and Arts Center, Daegu

2020

- Made in Daegu II, Daegu Art Museum, Daegu
- Summon Memorry, Suseoung Artpia, Daegu

2019

- Mediacity, Yangpyeong Museum of Art, Yangpyeong
- Start-up, Suseuong Artpia, Daegu

2018

- Fire Art Festival 2018 Pyeongchang Culture Olympics, Korea Culture and Arts Committee, Gangneung
- Daegu self-portrait of contemporary art (21st anniversary since 1997), midsummer night party, Daegu Culture and Arts Center, Daegu
- The 34th South Korea International Contemporary Art Festival – From Agglomeration to Momentum, Gallery Joy, Busan
- Daegu Catholic Artists Rotate, De Mans Gallery, Daegu

2017

- Sea Art Festival, Busan Biennale, Busan
- Daegu's body, Daegu Culture and Arts Center, Daegu
- Looking at the flow of contemporary art, Yeosu Expo Art Gallery, Yeosu
- Barcode, Yangpyeong Art Museum, Yangpyeong

2016

- Daegu contemporary art, Daegu art & cultural center, Daegu
- Life Painting Artist, Daegu art & cultural center, Daegu
- O, DokBulZangGun, Ujong Museum of art, Bosung

2015

- ICAPU "Between"_ Empty house project, Ulsan Cultural Street, Ulsan

2014

- Daegu Contemporary Art Festival-"From Kyungshanggamyeung To Jongno", Daegu Cultural Art Center Museum, Daegu
- CMCP_Collective Memory Collective Power, Bongsan Art Center, Daegu

2013

- Daegu Contemporary Art Festival, Power Plant of Creation, Daegu
- Fashion with Pattern, 63Sky Art Museum, Seoul

2012

- Daegu Culture Award- Invitation Exhibit of Prizewinner, Daegu Culture & Art Center, Daegu

2011

- KIAF/11-Mirror of time& The gate through Future, Gallery Soheon, COEX, Seoul
- Light and Spirit of Daegu Art-Now in Daegu, Daegu
- Invited show of KANG, IK JOONG KWON, JUNG HO JHEON SOO CHEON, Soosung Artphia, Gallery Hoban, Media Holl, Daegu
- Daegu Art Museum Opening 2nd Tema Exhibition(Life & Culture), Daegu Art Museum, Daegu

2010

- Korean Doyen Artists Invitation Exhibit-Korea Art Festival 2010, KINTEX, Ilsan
- Daegu Art Fair 2010, Daegu EXCO, Daegu

== Publications ==
- Works of Memory kwonjungho (2023)
- KWONJUNGHO (2024)
