= Ji Jae-gwan =

South Korean hockey player

Personal information
- Nationality: South Korean
- Born: 20 March 1960 (age 66)

Sport
- Sport: Field hockey
Medal record
Men's field hockey
Representing South Korea
Asian Games
Gold medal – first place	1986 Seongnam	Team

Ji Jae-gwan (born 20 March 1960) is a South Korean field hockey player. He competed in the men's tournament at the 1988 Summer Olympics.
