= Kim Hyun-jun =

South Korean basketball player (1960–1999)

Personal information
- Born: June 3, 1960
- Died: October 2, 1999 (aged 39) Seongnam, South Korea
- Listed height: 182 cm (6 ft 0 in)
Medals
Men's basketball
Representing South Korea
FIBA Asia Championship
Bronze medal – third place	1983 Hong Kong	Team
Silver medal – second place	1985 Kuala Lumpur	Team
Silver medal – second place	1987 Bangkok	Team
Silver medal – second place	1989 Beijing	Team
Silver medal – second place	1991 Kobe	Team
Bronze medal – third place	1993 Jakarta	Team
Asian Games
Silver medal – second place	1986 Seoul	Team
Bronze medal – third place	1990 Beijing	Team

- Kim Hyun-jun
- Hangul: 김현준
- RR: Gim Hyeonjun
- MR: Kim Hyŏnjun

Kim Hyun-jun (Korean: 김현준; June 3, 1960 – October 2, 1999) was a South Korean basketball player.

He played as a shooting guard. He was 182 cm (6 ft 0 in) tall. He competed at the 1988 Seoul Olympic Games, where the South Korean team finished in ninth position.

His former teams include Samsung Electronics, and he was appointed assistant coach of Samsung Electronics after he retired as a player.

He died of a car accident in Seongnam on October 2, 1999.
