= Heun, Nebraska =

Unincorporated community in Nebraska, U.S.

Coordinates: 41°37′48″N 97°02′26″W

Heun is an unincorporated community in Colfax County, Nebraska, United States.

== History ==
Heun was named for its founder, William Heun, a native of Germany. The local cemetery has been in use since 1871. In 1878, Heun and native Czech John Fulda each donated five acres of land to build Holy Trinity Catholic Church and a consecrated burial ground. The church was rebuilt into a second brick church, the first Mass in which was held in 1928. As of 2016, the church is still active with 200 parishioners. At times it also had a social hall which is no longer standing.

The parish fosters a specific local Tarot card game, a variety of Königrufen, under the czech name Taroky.
