= Polin Belisle =

Belize and Honduras marathon runner

Personal information
- Nationality: Belizean; Honduran; American
- Born: Apolinario Belisle Gómez; July 2, 1966 (age 60) Honduras

Sport
- Sport: Long-distance running
- Events: Half marathon, Marathon

Achievements and titles
- Olympic finals: 1988, 1992

Apolinario "Polin" Belisle Gómez (born July 2, 1966) is a former marathon runner. He represented Belize at the 1988 Olympic Games and was scheduled to represent Honduras at the 1992 Olympic Games, before being removed from the team, although he nevertheless took part in the marathon event.

== Personal life ==
Polin Belisle was born in Honduras, and brought up in Belize. After Belisle's parents divorced in 1970, his mother moved to Los Angeles, US. Belisle later moved to Cerritos, California, US in 1975. In 1989, Belisle became a naturalized American citizen. He studied at Burbank High School in the US. Belisle is married to Mary-Ann.

== Career ==
Belisle recorded a time of 2:36:18 at the 1988 Long Beach Marathon to finish 20th, although it was later rumored that he had only started the race, and rested in the middle of the race. Nevertheless, he was chosen to represent Belize in the marathon at the 1988 Summer Olympics in Seoul, where he finished 98th and last place of the finishers, in a time of 3:14:02, more than an hour slower than the winner, Gelindo Bordin.

In April 1990, Belisle set the Belize half-marathon record by recording a time of 1:13:30 in the Belize City marathon. His record stood until 2006, when it was beaten by Ron Hyde. In 1991, Belisle was disqualified from the 1991 Long Beach Marathon after CCTV footage could not spot him during the middle of the race; he had originally finished fifth. Belisle was also disqualified from the 1992 Los Angeles Marathon, in which he had finished 20th, for the same reason.

Prior to the 1992 Summer Olympics, Belisle applied to compete for the Honduras under the name Apolineria Belisle Gomez. (Note: Belisle had competed for Belize at the 1988 Olympics under the name Polin Belisle.) Belisle told the Honduras Olympic Committee that he had been born in Honduras and moved to the United States when he was six; he omitted to mention that he had spent some of his childhood in Belize, and also that he had competed for Belize at the 1988 Olympics. (Note: As Belisle had competed for Belize at the 1988 Olympics, he would have required permission to compete from the Belize Olympic Committee.) Belisle also mentioned his time at the Los Angeles marathon, which was quicker than any Honduran athlete had run, and Belisle even offered to pay for his own travel expenses to the Games. On July 15, Belisle swore an oath to the Honduras Olympic Team, and was entered to compete in the 5,000 meters, 10,000 meters and marathon events at the 1992 Olympics. On July 29, Belisle was noticed by the Belize Olympic team, who informed Ned Pitts, the president of the Belizean Olympic Committee. After being reported to the Honduras Olympic Committee, Belisle was removed from the team, and thrown out of the Olympic Village, although he kept his identity card and race number. As a result, Belisle was still able to compete in the marathon race, running with the leaders for the first mile before dropping back. He did not finish the race. He is believed to have been the first unauthorized runner to compete at the Olympics since 1984, when Margaret de Jesús competed in place of her sister Madeline in a qualifying heat of the 4×400 meters race.

Later in the year, Belisle won the Dam Tough Run around Lake Isabella. The race was 38.6 miles (62.1 km) long, and Belisle had never run further than a marathon distance before. During the race, Belisle was heckled, and after the race, it was disputed whether Belisle had run the whole race distance. He had passed through all 19 checkpoints on the course, though it was alleged that he had not gone through many of the water points.
