= Jeong Mi-kyeong =

South Korean basketball player

Personal information
- Nationality: South Korean
- Born: 23 December 1965 (age 59)

Sport
- Sport: Basketball

Korean name
- Hangul: 정미경
- Hanja: 鄭美景
- RR: Jeong Migyeong
- MR: Chŏng Migyŏng

Jeong Mi-kyeong (born 23 December 1965) is a South Korean basketball player. She competed in the women's tournament at the 1988 Summer Olympics.
