= Park Ju-ri =

South Korean swimmer

Personal information
- Born: 16 July 1971 (age 54)

Sport
- Sport: Swimming
- Strokes: freestyle

Park Ju-ri (born 16 July 1971) is a retired South Korean freestyle swimmer. She competed in three events at the 1988 Summer Olympics.
