= Kwon Yong-kwan =

South Korean baseball player

- Infielder
- Born: November 19, 1976 (age 49); Seoul
- Batted: Right Threw: Right

KBO debut
- April 13, 1996, for the LG Twins

Last appearance
- September 4, 2016, for the Hanwha Eagles

KBO statistics
- Batting average: .227
- Hits: 698
- Home runs: 47
- RBI: 300
- Stats at Baseball Reference

Teams
- LG Twins (1996–2010); SK Wyverns (2010–2012); LG Twins (2013–2014); Hanwha Eagles (2015–2016)

- Kwon Yong-kwan
- Hangul: 권용관
- RR: Gwon Yonggwan
- MR: Kwŏn Yonggwan

Kwon Yong-kwan (born November 19, 1976) is a former South Korean professional baseball infielder who lastly played for the Hanwha Eagles of the KBO League.
