= Lee Hong-mi =

South Korean swimmer (born 1971)

Personal information
- Born: 25 January 1971 (age 55)

Sport
- Sport: Swimming
- Strokes: butterfly, freestyle
Medal record
Representing South Korea
Asian Games
Bronze medal – third place	1986 Seoul	4x100m medley relay

Lee Hong-mi (born 25 January 1971) is a South Korean swimmer. She competed in three events at the 1988 Summer Olympics.
