= Kwon Teckyoung =

- Born: 1947 (age 78–79)
- Education: University of Nebraska–Lincoln
- Occupations: Literary critic, translator
- Employer: Kyung Hee University

Korean name
- Hangul: 권택영
- Hanja: 權澤英
- RR: Gwon Taekyeong
- MR: Kwŏn T'aegyŏng

Teckyoung Kwon (born 1947) is a literary critic, translator and professor in English literature at the School of English, Kyung Hee University, Seoul. Her research interests are psychoanalysis, ecology, American and British fiction, narrative theory, neuro-humanities, Korean literature and Dao.

== Education and career ==
Kwon received her PhD in English from the University of Nebraska–Lincoln in 1980.

From 1980 to present she has been professor of English at Kyung Hee University. She was visiting scholar in critical theory at the University of California, Berkeley in 1986. Between 1989 and 1995 she was editor of several Korean literary magazines including Literature of East and West (1989-1994), La Plume,(1995-2002) and The Other Criticism (2002-2004). Between 1999 and 2003 she was on the editorial board for the Journal of English Language and Literature. She was visiting scholar in psychoanalysis and Taoism) at the Kent State University in 2001.

Her research interests include: psychoanalysis, ecology, American and British fiction, narrative theory, neuro-humanities, Korean literature and Dao.

=== Roles ===
- 2002-2004: Korean Society of Lacan and Contemporary Psychoanalysis, president
- 2005-2007: American Fiction Association of Korea, president
- 2006-2008: KAPS, founding member and president
- 2007: International conference for Korean Association of Psychoanalysis and Society (KAPS) on "Psychoanalysis and the New Political Paradigm in the Global Age", organiser
- 2008: American Studies Association of Korea, president-elect
- 2009: American Studies Association of Korea, president

== Awards ==
- Multiple research awards from the National Research Foundation of Korea and Kyung Hee University
- 1997: Distinguished Critic of the Year - Kim-Hwantae Critic Award
- 1997: Distinguished Alumni Award by Kung Hee University
- 2000 on: Special Research Professor, Kyung Hee University
- 2010-2011: Kyung Hee fellow
- 2012-2017: National Research Foundation of Korea (NRF) fellow for "excellent scholarship in humanities"

== Publications ==
=== Books ===
- 1990: Post-Structuralism and Literary Theory (Seoul: Minum-Sa Publishing Co.)
- 1990: What is Post-Modernism? (Seoul: Minum-Sa): a steady seller in Korea: the 10th printing in 2012.
- 1994: Lacan and Desire (editing and translating Lacan's major writings) (Seoul: Munyae): a steady seller in Korea
- 1995: How to Read a Fiction? (Fiction and Narrative Theories)(Seoul: Munyae). The Best Book of the Year by Ministry of Culture and Education: the 11th printing in 2012.
- 1995: Desire in the Film and Fiction (Seoul: Minum-Sa)
- 1997: Writing in the Multicultural Age (Seoul: Munyae) Winner of Kim-Hwantae Critic Award
- 1998: Freud: Sexuality and Power (Seoul: Munyae)
- 2001: In the Realm of the Senses: Lacan and Film Interpretations (Seoul: Minum-Sa)
- 2002: Lacan, Zhuangzi, and Korean Flag (Seoul: Minum-Sa)
- 2003: Age of Surplus Enjoyment: ?i?ek and Post-industrial Society (Seoul: Munyae)
- 2005: Body and Aesthetics (Seoul: Kyung Hee University Press)
- 2010: Jacques Lacan: Nature and Man (Seoul: HanKook Munhwa-sa) The Best Book of the Year by Ministry of Culture, Sports, and Tourism
- 2014: Bio-Humanity: Beyond the Boundary between Man and Nature (Seoul: Jip Moon Dang Publisher) supported by A-San Research Foundation
- 2015: Selected Literary Essays on Korean Literature of Teckyoung Kwon (one of 50 Korean Literary Critics of the 20th Century) (Seoul: Giman-G. Publisher).
- 2017. Nabokov's Mimicry of Freud: Art as Science. New York: Lexington Books, Imprint of Rowman & Littlefield, 2017.
- 2018. Deception in Thinking: Why AI can't be the human brain. Seoul: Writing-Pot, 2018.
- 2021. Emotion: The importance of a warm and intimate feeling. Seoul: Writing-Pot, 2021

=== Translations into Korean ===
- 1988: The Real Life of Sebastian Knight by Vladimir Nabokov (Seoul: Chung Ha)
- 1988: Deconstructive Criticism by Vincent B. Leith (Seoul: Munyae)
- 1989: Psychoanalytic Criticism: Theory in Practice by Elizabeth Wright (Seoul: Munyae)
- 1992: Narrative Discourse: An Essay in Method by Gerard Genette (Seoul: KyoboMungo)
- 1997: Lolita by Vladimir Nabokov (with Critical Introduction, Seoul: Minumsa)
- 2004: The Way of Zhuangzi by Thomas Merton (Seoul: Yuenhang Namoo)
- 2007: The Armies of the Night by Norman Mailer (Seoul: Minumsa)
- 2010: The Call of the Wild by Jack London (Seoul: Minumsa)

== Selected articles since 2000 (published in Seoul) ==
- 2000: "Lacan's Courtly Love and Lolita " (The Journal of Criticism and Theory)
- 2001: "Death Drive Makes a Plot: Don DeLillo's White Noise" (The Journal of English Language and Literature)
- 2002: "The Transformations of Jouissance in a Mythic Knowledge" (Journal of Lacan & Contemporary Psychoanalysis)
- 2002: "Butler's Queer Theory and Psychoanalysis" (Feminist Studies in English Literature )
- 2002: "A Gesture Life as Gaze: the Multicultural Ethics of Lacan and Chang-Rae Lee" (The Journal of English Language and Literature)
- 2003: "Toni Morrison's Sula: The Real and the Politics of Body" (Studies in Modern Fiction)
- 2003: "The Return of Aesthetics: The Real in Slavoj Žižek's Psychoanalysis" (The Journal of Criticism and Theory)
- 2004: "The Eternal Return: Beyond the Opposition of New Historicism to Psychoanalysis (Modern Studies in English Language & Literature)
- 2004: "Return to Freud: Does Lacanian Signifier Mean Love or Hate?" (Journal of Lacan & Contemporary Psychoanalysis)
- 2004: "The Politics of Negativity: Adorno and Chuang-Tzu" (Korean Literary Theory and Criticism)
- 2005: "Mode of Remembering in Keller's Comfort Woman" (Studies in Hawthorne & American Novel)
- 2005: "Enlightenment and Negativity: The Korean Images Portrayed in Mao ll and Native Speaker" (Journal of American Studies)
- 2005: "JongSaeng-Gi": The Works of Sang Lee from a Perspective of Symptoms" (Korean Literary Theory and Criticism)
- 2006: "Lacan and Joyce: Writing as Symptom" (Korean Journal of James Joyce)
- 2006: "Korean Trauma in American Fiction: Repeating Images in "Chosun Episode" and Dictee" (American Fiction Studies)
- 2007: "Empedocles's ‘Rhizomata’ and Lacan's Nature" (Korean Literary Theory and Criticism)
- 2007: "The Number 4 Revisited in Joyce and Lacan" (Journal of James Joyce)
- 2007: "Emersonian Pragmatism in Light of Taoism: The Revision toward Ecology" (The Journal of English Language and Literature)
- 2008: "The Phenomenology of War in Mailer's The Armies of the Night" (The Journal of English Language and Literature)
- 2008: "Sublime Beauty and Productive Circulation: The Role of a Third Space" (Transformative Challenges: Modern Civilization and Beyond)
- 2008: "A Transition towards the Post-Classical Narratologies: Space and Time as the Other (Korean Literary Theory and Criticism)
- 2008: "The Position of the Implied Author in Nabokov's Lolita (American Fiction Studies)
- 2009: "Reading Chung-jun Lee's Fiction as Symptom" (Korean Literary Theory and Criticism)
- 2009: "Narrative Theories of America and Europe: The Implied Author and Narrator" (Journal of Asia-Pacific Studies)
- 2009: The Paradigm Shift in Narratology: From Structure to Reading Experience (Oughtopia: The Journal of Social Paradigm Studies)
- 2009: Theory and Form in Narrative: Genette and Metafiction (Journal of American Studies)
- 2010: Disputes on Freudian Legacy and a Paradigm Shift (The Journal of English Language and Literature)
- 2010: Phenomenological Body: Chunsoo Kim's "Flower" and ChungJoon Lee's Return to the Native Place (Korean Literary Theory and Criticism)
- 2010: The Materiality of Body and the Paradigm Shift (Kyung Hee Studies of Humanities)
- 2011: Theoretical Background of Eco-humanism: Towards Bio-humanity (Korean Literary theory and Criticism )
- 2011: Merleau-Ponty's Intertwining as a Theory of Communion (The Journal of English Language and Literature)
- 2013: Neuro-Humanities: The Recent Discourses on Memory and Cognition (Psychoanalysis)

== (Publications in U.S.A): A & HCI Journals ==
- 2010: "Materiality of Remembering: Freud's Wolf Man and the Biological Dimensions of Memory." New Literary History 41. 1(2010 Winter): 213–232.
- 2011: "Nabokov's Memory War against Freud" American Imago. 68.1 (2011 Spring): 67–91.
- 2015: "Love as an Act of Dissimulation in "The Beast in the Jungle." Henry James Review 36 (2015): 148–162.
- 2016: Bahn, Geon Ho, Teckyoung Kwon, & Minha Hong. “Empathy in Medical Education.” Psychology and Neurobiology of Empathy. Eds. Watt, Douglas F. & Jaak Panksepp, New York: Nova Biomedical Publisher, pp. 229– 258.(Book Chapter)
- 2020: Teckyoung Kwon. “Nabokov and Indeterminacy: The Case of The Real Life of Sebastian Knight by Priscilla Meyer.” Studies in the Novel 52.1(Spring 2020), pp. 101–102.(Book Review)
