= Mo Ji-yeong =

South Korean hockey player

Personal information
- Nationality: South Korean
- Born: 23 June 1964 (age 62)

Sport
- Sport: Field hockey
Medal record
Men's field hockey
Representing South Korea
Asian Games
Gold medal – first place	1986 Seongnam	Team

Mo Ji-yeong (born 23 June 1964) is a South Korean field hockey player. He competed in the men's tournament at the 1988 Summer Olympics.
