= Park Chan-mi =

South Korean basketball player

Personal information
- Nationality: South Korean
- Born: 22 May 1964 (age 60)

Sport
- Sport: Basketball

Park Chan-mi (born 22 May 1964) is a South Korean basketball player. She competed in the women's tournament at the 1988 Summer Olympics.
