= Yun Ju-il =

South Korean swimmer (born 1973)

Personal information
- Born: 26 January 1973 (age 53)

Sport
- Sport: Swimming
Medal record
Representing South Korea
Asian Games
Bronze medal – third place	1990 Beijing	4x100m medley relay

Yun Ju-il (born 26 January 1973) is a South Korean breaststroke swimmer. He competed in three events at the 1988 Summer Olympics.
