= Kim Su-jin (swimmer) =

South Korean swimmer

Personal information
- Born: 18 March 1974 (age 52)

Sport
- Sport: Swimming
- Strokes: butterfly
Medal record
Representing South Korea
Asian Games
Bronze medal – third place	1990 Beijing	4x100m medley relay

Kim Su-jin (born 18 March 1974) is a retired South Korean butterfly swimmer. She competed in two events at the 1988 Summer Olympics.
