= Carlos Retiz =

Mexican long-distance runner

Personal information
- Born: November 5, 1968 (age 57) Mexico City, Mexico

Sport
- Sport: Marathon running

Carlos Rétiz Gutiérrez (born November 5, 1968) is a retired long-distance runner from Mexico. He represented his native country at the 1988 Summer Olympics in Seoul, South Korea, where he finished in 50th place in the men's marathon, clocking a total time of 2:25:34.

His sister Patricia Rétiz is also a marathon runner.

== Achievements ==
Year	Competition	Venue	Position	Event	Notes
Representing Mexico
1988	Olympic Games	Seoul, South Korea	50th	Marathon	2:25:34
