= Park Yeong-cheol =

South Korean swimmer

Personal information
- Born: 16 April 1969 (age 57)

Sport
- Sport: Swimming

Park Yeong-cheol (born 16 April 1969) is a South Korean butterfly swimmer. He competed in three events at the 1988 Summer Olympics.
