= Kim Eun-jeong (swimmer) =

South Korean swimmer (born 1973)

Personal information
- Born: 7 May 1973 (age 53)

Sport
- Sport: Swimming
- Strokes: freestyle
Medal record
Representing South Korea
Asian Games
Silver medal – second place	1986 Seoul	4x100m freestyle relay

Kim Eun-jeong (born 7 May 1973) is a South Korean swimmer. She competed in three events at the 1988 Summer Olympics.
