= Kwon Seok-geun =

South Korean footballer

Kwon Seok-Geun
Personal information
- Full name: Kwon Seok-Geun
- Date of birth: May 8, 1983 (age 43)
- Place of birth: South Korea
- Height: 1.70 m (5 ft 7 in)
- Position: Midfielder

Team information
- Current team: Ansan Hallelujah
- Number: 4

Senior career*
Years	Team	Apps	(Gls)
2006	Ulsan Hyundai Horang-i	1	(0)
2006	Ulsan Hyundai Mipo Dockyard		
2007	Ulsan Hyundai Horang-i	0	(0)
2008	Roasso Kumamoto	2	(0)
2009–	Ansan Hallelujah	23	(1)
- * Club domestic league appearances and goals as of 19 December 2008

Kwon Seok-Geun (born May 8, 1983) is a South Korean football player who currently plays for Ansan Hallelujah.

Kwon previously played for Roasso Kumamoto.
