= Kim Sa-seok =

South Korean volleyball player (born 1967)

Personal information
- Nationality: South Korean
- Born: 13 September 1967 (age 57)

Sport
- Sport: Volleyball

Kim Sa-seok (born 13 September 1967) is a South Korean volleyball player. He competed in the men's tournament at the 1988 Summer Olympics.
