= Seongnam Sports Complex =

Sports venue in Seongnam, South Korea

Coordinates: 37°25′59″N 127°08′15″E

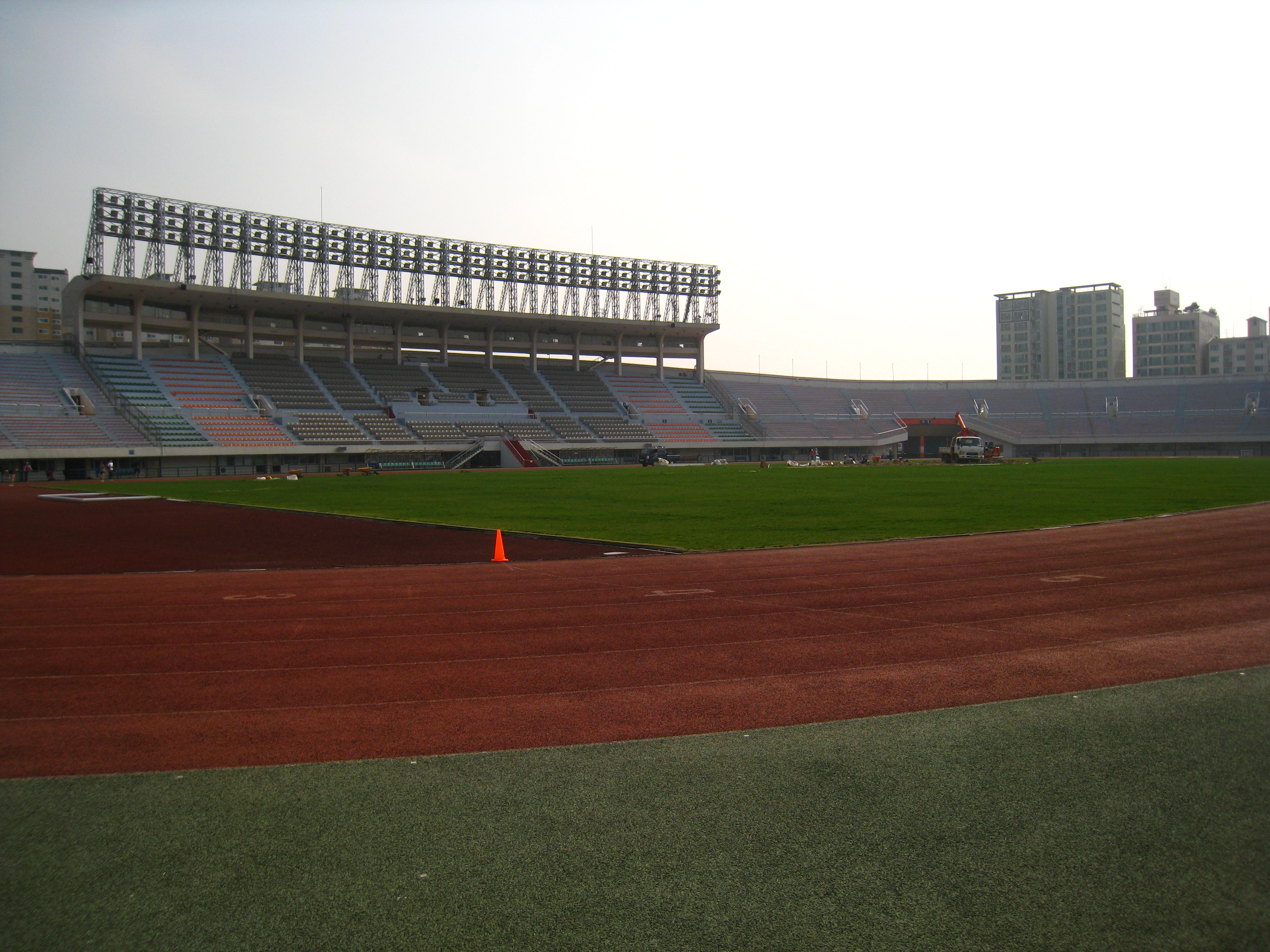
Seongnam Stadium

Seongnam Sports Complex (Korean: 성남종합운동장) is a group of sports facilities in Seongnam, South Korea.

The complex consists of the Seongnam Stadium, Field hockey field, and Indoor Arena.

== Facilities ==
=== Seongnam Stadium ===
It is a multi-purpose stadium in Seongnam, South Korea. It was built in December 1984 and used for field hockey matches at the 1988 Summer Olympics, but it is currently used mostly for football matches. It was the main stadium of Seongnam Ilhwa Chunma (currently Seongnam FC) until 2004. Now, Seongnam FC uses Tancheon Stadium as their home stadium for most of their games. The stadium holds 27,000 people (21,242 seats) and the city government is considering reconstruction of the stadium, because of its decrepit condition.

=== Seongnam Indoor Arena ===
The Seongnam Indoor Arena with a capacity for 5,711 spectators was used by a volleyball team Seongnam Korea Expressway Corporation Hi-pass Zenith of V-League, until the team was relocated to Gimcheon.
