= Song Gwang-seon =

South Korean swimmer

Personal information
- Born: 1 May 1970 (age 56) South Korea
- Height: 5 ft 9.5 in (177 cm)
- Weight: 157 lb (71 kg)

Sport
- Sport: Swimming

Song Gwang-seon (born 1 May 1970) is a retired South Korean freestyle swimmer. He competed in four events at the 1988 Summer Olympics.
