= Park Hyeon-gon =

South Korean cyclist

Personal information
- Born: 19 February 1968 (age 58)

Cycling career
- Sport: Cycling

Park Hyeon-gon (born 19 February 1968) is a South Korean former cyclist. He competed in two events at the 1988 Summer Olympics.
