= Han Yeong-hui =

South Korean swimmer

Personal information
- Born: 10 April 1973 (age 53)

Sport
- Sport: Swimming
- Strokes: freestyle

Han Yeong-hui (born 10 April 1973) is a South Korean swimmer. She competed in four events at the 1988 Summer Olympics.
