= Mun Seon-hui (volleyball) =

South Korean volleyball player (born 1968)

Personal information
- Nationality: South Korean
- Born: 18 October 1968 (age 56)

Sport
- Sport: Volleyball

Mun Seon-hui (born 18 October 1968) is a South Korean volleyball player. She competed in the women's tournament at the 1988 Summer Olympics.
