= Lim Hye-sook (volleyball) =

South Korean volleyball player (born 1965)

Personal information
- Nationality: South Korean
- Born: 18 October 1965 (age 59)

Sport
- Sport: Volleyball

Lim Hye-sook (born 18 October 1965) is a South Korean volleyball player. She competed at the 1984 Summer Olympics and the 1988 Summer Olympics.
