= Kim Yun-hye =

South Korean volleyball player (born 1967)

Personal information
- Nationality: South Korean
- Born: 19 January 1967 (age 58)

Sport
- Sport: Volleyball

Kim Yun-hye (born 19 January 1967) is a South Korean volleyball player. She competed in the women's tournament at the 1988 Summer Olympics.
