= Kim Yoon-ho (basketball) =

South Korean basketball player

Personal information
- Nationality: South Korean
- Born: 21 March 1963 (age 62)

Sport
- Sport: Basketball

Korean name
- Hangul: 김윤호
- Hanja: 金允皓
- RR: Gim Yunho
- MR: Kim Yunho

Kim Yoon-ho (born 21 March 1963) is a South Korean basketball player. He competed in the men's tournament at the 1988 Summer Olympics.
