= Kwon Sang-won =

South Korean swimmer (born 1969)

Personal information
- Born: 7 June 1969 (age 57)

Sport
- Sport: Swimming
Medal record
Representing South Korea
Asian Games
Bronze medal – third place	1990 Beijing	4x200m freestyle relay

Kwon Sang-won (born 7 June 1969) is a South Korean swimmer. He competed in five events at the 1988 Summer Olympics.
