= Lee Moon-kyu =

South Korean basketball player

South Korea
- Position: Head coach

Personal information
- Born: 4 August 1956 (age 70)
- Listed height: 6 ft 2.5 in (1.89 m)
- Listed weight: 183 lb (83 kg)

Other information

Korean name
- Hangul: 이문규
- RR: I Mungyu
- MR: I Mun'gyu
Medals
Men's basketball
Representing South Korea
Asian Games
Silver medal – second place	1978 Bangkok	Team
Silver medal – second place	1986 Seoul	Team

Lee Moon-kyu (Korean: 이문규; born 4 August 1956) is a South Korean basketball player. He competed in the men's tournament at the 1988 Summer Olympics.
