= Gwon Seong-nak =

South Korean long-distance runner

Personal information
- Nationality: South Korean
- Born: 19 December 1964 (age 61)

Sport
- Sport: Long-distance running
- Event: Marathon

Gwon Seong-nak (born 19 December 1964) is a South Korean long-distance runner. He competed in the men's marathon at the 1988 Summer Olympics.

He ran his best time of 2:12:51 to finish 3rd at the Seoul International Marathon on 20 March 1988.
