= Korea women's national basketball team =

Korea
- FIBA ranking: N/A
- Joined FIBA: N/A
- FIBA zone: N/A
- National federation: Korea Basketball Association / Amateur Basketball Association of DPR of Korea
- Coach: Lee Moon-kyu

Olympic Games
- Appearances: None

World Cup
- Appearances: None

Asian Games
- Appearances: 1
- Medals: Silver: (2018)

First international
- Korea 108–40 Indonesia (Jakarta, Indonesia; 15 August 2018)

Biggest win
- Korea 108–40 Indonesia (Jakarta, Indonesia; 15 August 2018)

Biggest defeat
- China 71–65 Korea (Jakarta, Indonesia; 1 September 2018)

The Korea women's national basketball team is a combined representative team composed of players from both South Korea and North Korea. The team competed in the 2018 Asian Games in Indonesia.

== History ==
The team competed in the 2018 Asian Games. South Korea and North Korea will compete as one in select events in the Asian Games. The composition of the 12-player team roster will be largely South Korean with 3 players being North Korean. The team will be led by South Korea's head coach Lee Moon-kyu.

South Korea and North Korea held exhibition games in men's and women's basketball at the Ryugyong Jong Ju Yong Gymnasium in the latter's capital of Pyongyang in July 2018. Two of the games featured mixed-teams with players from both countries; Team Prosperity and Team Peace while the other two games featured the national teams of both countries. Head coach Lee Moon-kyu used the exhibition matches by the women's teams to scout for possible North Korean players who may be included in the unified Korea team.

In the group stage of the women's basketball competition, the unified Korea was drawn in Group X with Kazakhstan, Indonesia and India.

In April 2019, the FIBA Central Board approved their participation "in principle" at the 2019 FIBA Women's Asia Cup. However such plan did not materialize with the Korean peninsula represented solely by South Korea in the tournament.

== Team image ==
The unified Korean team had a local Korean manufacturer as their kit supplier instead of the Nike, the kit-supplier of the South Korea women's national team to avoid violating sanctions imposed on North Korea banning the importation of luxury goods including sports equipment.

== See also ==
- Korea Team
- Korea women's national ice hockey team
