= Kwon Sun-pil =

South Korean hockey player (born 1967)

Personal information
- Nationality: South Korean
- Born: 7 July 1967 (age 58)

Sport
- Sport: Field hockey
Medal record
Men's field hockey
Representing South Korea
Asian Games
Gold medal – first place	1986 Seongnam	Team

Kwon Sun-pil (born 7 July 1967) is a South Korean field hockey player. He competed in the men's tournament at the 1988 Summer Olympics.
