= Gwon Sun-geun =

South Korean swimmer

Personal information
- Born: 15 February 1969 (age 57)

Sport
- Sport: Swimming

Gwon Sun-geun (born 15 February 1969) is a South Korean freestyle swimmer. He competed in four events at the 1988 Summer Olympics.
