= Fencing at the 1996 Summer Olympics – Women's foil =

Olympic fencing tournament

Women's foil at the Games of the XXVI Olympiad
- Venue: Georgia World Congress Center
- Dates: 22 July 1996
- Competitors: 40 from 17 nations

Medalists
1st place, gold medalist(s)		Laura Cârlescu-Badea	Romania
2nd place, silver medalist(s)		Valentina Vezzali	Italy
3rd place, bronze medalist(s)		Giovanna Trillini	Italy

The women's foil was one of ten fencing events on the fencing at the 1996 Summer Olympics programme. It was the fifteenth appearance of the event. The competition was held on 22 July 1996. 40 fencers from 17 nations competed.

== Draw ==
=== Finals ===
Semifinals
Valentina Vezzali (ITA)	15
Laurence Modaine-Cessac (FRA)	7
Laura Cârlescu-Badea (ROU)	15
Giovanna Trillini (ITA)	14

Final
Valentina Vezzali (ITA)	10
Laura Cârlescu-Badea (ROU)	15
Bronze medal match
Giovanna Trillini (ITA)	15
Laurence Modaine-Cessac (FRA)	9

=== Section 1 ===
Round of 64
Jeon Mi-Gyeong (KOR)	15
Suzanne Paxton (USA)	14
Ayelet Ohayon (ISR)	15
Carmen Rodríguez (GUA)	2

Round of 32
Valentina Vezzali (ITA)	15
Jeon Mi-Gyeong (KOR)	12
Olga Velichko (RUS)	15
Gabriella Lantos (HUN)	14
Ann Marsh (USA)	15
Clothilde Magnan (FRA)	9
Ayelet Ohayon (ISR)	10
Sabine Bau (GER)	15

Round of 16
Valentina Vezzali (ITA)	15
Olga Velichko (RUS)	13
Ann Marsh (USA)	15
Sabine Bau (GER)	8

Quarterfinals
Valentina Vezzali (ITA)	15
Ann Marsh (USA)	10

=== Section 2 ===
Round of 64
Katarzyna Felusiak (POL)	15
Henda Zaouali (TUN)	9
Wang Huifeng (CHN)	15
Alejandra Carbone (ARG)	4

Round of 32
Monika Weber-Koszto (GER)	15
Katarzyna Felusiak (POL)	14
Felicia Zimmermann (USA)	12
Lydia Czuckermann-Hatuel (ISR)	15
Laurence Modaine-Cessac (FRA)	15
Olga Sharkova-Sidorova (RUS)	14
Wang Huifeng (CHN)	10
Diana Bianchedi (ITA)	15

Round of 16
Monika Weber-Koszto (GER)	15
Lydia Czuckermann-Hatuel (ISR)	13
Laurence Modaine-Cessac (FRA)	15
Diana Bianchedi (ITA)	0

Quarterfinals
Monika Weber-Koszto (GER)	14
Laurence Modaine-Cessac (FRA)	15

=== Section 3 ===
Round of 64
Yanina Iannuzzi (ARG)	7
Lilach Parisky (ISR)	15
Liang Jun (CHN)	15
Ferial Salhi (ALG)	7

Round of 32
Laura Badea-Cârlescu (ROU)	15
Lilach Parisky (ISR)	5
Reka Zsofia Lazăr-Szabo (ROU)	12
Adeline Wuillème (FRA)	15
Aida Mohamed (HUN)	15
Anna Rybicka (POL)	8
Liang Jun (CHN)	10
Anja Fichtel-Mauritz (GER)	15

Round of 16
Laura Badea-Cârlescu (ROU)	15
Adeline Wuillème (FRA)	6
Aida Mohamed (HUN)	15
Anja Fichtel-Mauritz (GER)	14

Quarterfinals
Laura Badea-Cârlescu (ROU)	15
Aida Mohamed (HUN)	8

=== Section 4 ===
Round of 64
Dolores Pampin (ARG)	8
Barbara Wolnicka-Szewczyk (POL)	15
Ivana Georgieva (BUL)	15
Fiona McIntosh (GBR)	4

Round of 32
Zsuzsa Némethné Jánosi (HUN)	15
Barbara Wolnicka-Szewczyk (POL)	11
Anna Angelova (BUL)	4
Xiao Aihua (CHN)	15
Svetlana Boyko (RUS)	10
Roxana Scarlat (ROU)	15
Ivana Georgieva (BUL)	8
Giovanna Trillini (ITA)	15

Round of 16
Zsuzsa Némethné Jánosi (HUN)	7
Xiao Aihua (CHN)	15
Roxana Scarlat (ROU)	11
Giovanna Trillini (ITA)	15

Quarterfinals
Xiao Aihua (CHN)	7
Giovanna Trillini (ITA)	15

== Results ==
Rank	Fencer	Country
1st place, gold medalist(s)	Laura Cârlescu-Badea	Romania
2nd place, silver medalist(s)	Valentina Vezzali	Italy
3rd place, bronze medalist(s)	Giovanna Trillini	Italy
4	Laurence Modaine-Cessac	France
5	Monika Weber-Koszto	Germany
6	Xiao Aihua	China
7	Ann Marsh	United States
8	Aida Mohamed	Hungary
9	Diana Bianchedi	Italy
10	Anja Fichtel-Mauritz	Germany
11	Zsuzsa Némethné Jánosi	Hungary
12	Sabine Bau	Germany
13	Lydia Czuckermann-Hatuel	Israel
14	Adeline Wuillème	France
15	Roxana Scarlat	Romania
16	Olga Velichko	Russia
17	Gabriella Lantos	Hungary
18	Svetlana Boyko	Russia
19	Reka Zsofia Lazăr-Szabo	Romania
20	Olga Sharkova-Sidorova	Russia
21	Felicia Zimmermann	United States
22	Anna Rybicka	Poland
23	Clothilde Magnan	France
24	Anna Angelova	Bulgaria
25	Barbara Wolnicka-Szewczyk	Poland
26	Ayelet Ohayon	Israel
27	Liang Jun	China
28	Katarzyna Felusiak	Poland
29	Wang Huifeng	China
30	Lilach Parisky	Israel
31	Ivana Georgieva	Bulgaria
32	Jeon Mi-Gyeong	South Korea
33	Suzanne Paxton	United States
34	Fiona McIntosh	Great Britain
35	Yanina Iannuzzi	Argentina
36	Alejandra Carbone	Argentina
37	Ferial Salhi	Algeria
38	Dolores Pampin	Argentina
39	Henda Zaouali	Tunisia
40	Carmen Rodríguez	Guatemala
