= Fencing at the 2000 Summer Olympics – Women's foil =

Olympic fencing tournament

Women's foil at the Games of the XXVII Olympiad
- Venue: Sydney Exhibition Centre
- Dates: 21 September 2000
- Competitors: 40 from 21 nations

Medalists
1st place, gold medalist(s)		Valentina Vezzali	Italy
2nd place, silver medalist(s)		Rita König	Germany
3rd place, bronze medalist(s)		Giovanna Trillini	Italy

The women's foil was one of ten fencing events on the fencing at the 2000 Summer Olympics programme. It was the sixteenth appearance of the event. The competition was held on 21 September 2000. 40 fencers from 21 nations competed.

== Draw ==
=== Finals ===
Semifinals
Valentina Vezzali (ITA)	15
Laura Cârlescu-Badea (ROU)	8
Rita König (GER)	15
Giovanna Trillini (ITA)	10

Final
Valentina Vezzali (ITA)	15
Rita König (GER)	5
Bronze medal match
Giovanna Trillini (ITA)	15
Laura Cârlescu-Badea (ROU)	9

=== Section 1 ===
Round of 64
Jujie Luan (CAN)	8
Seo Mi-Jeong (KOR)	15
Ann Marsh (USA)	15
Shaimaa El-Gammal (EGY)	7

Round of 32
Valentina Vezzali (ITA)	15
Seo Mi-Jeong (KOR)	3
Sylwia Gruchała (POL)	15
Edina Knapek (HUN)	6
Reka Zsofia Lazăr-Szabo (ROU)	15
Julie Mahoney (CAN)	10
Ann Marsh (USA)	15
Yekaterina Yusheva (RUS)	9

Round of 16
Valentina Vezzali (ITA)	15
Sylwia Gruchała (POL)	8
Reka Zsofia Lazăr-Szabo (ROU)	15
Ann Marsh (USA)	7

Quarterfinals
Valentina Vezzali (ITA)	9
Reka Zsofia Lazăr-Szabo (ROU)	8

=== Section 2 ===
Round of 64
Nelya Sevostiyanova (KAZ)	3
Yuan Li (CHN)	15
Migsey Dussu (CUB)	15
Liudmyla Vasylieva (UKR)	6

Round of 32
Diana Bianchedi (ITA)	15
Yuan Li (CHN)	7
Ayelet Ohayon (ISR)	15
Adeline Wuillème (FRA)	12
Meng Jie (CHN)	15
Anna Rybicka (POL)	9
Migsey Dussu (CUB)	6
Laura Badea-Cârlescu (ROU)	15

Round of 16
Diana Bianchedi (ITA)	15
Ayelet Ohayon (ISR)	12
Meng Jie (CHN)	7
Laura Badea-Cârlescu (ROU)	15

Quarterfinals
Diana Bianchedi (ITA)	4
Laura Badea-Cârlescu (ROU)	15

=== Section 3 ===
Round of 64
Jo Halls (AUS)	7
Eloise Smith (GBR)	15
Miwako Shimada (JPN)	13
Alejandra Carbone (ARG)	15

Round of 32
Giovanna Trillini (ITA)	15
Eloise Smith (GBR)	2
Olga Sharkova-Sidorova (RUS)	12
Iris Zimmermann (USA)	15
Svetlana Boyko (RUS)	9
Magdalena Mroczkiewicz (POL)	15
Alejandra Carbone (ARG)	8
Xiao Aihua (CHN)	15

Round of 16
Giovanna Trillini (ITA)	15
Iris Zimmermann (USA)	4
Magdalena Mroczkiewicz (POL)	13
Xiao Aihua (CHN)	15

Quarterfinals
Giovanna Trillini (ITA)	9
Xiao Aihua (CHN)	8

=== Section 4 ===
Round of 64
Wassila Rédouane-Saïd-Guerni (ALG)	3
Yuko Arai (JPN)	15
Olha Leleiko (UKR)	14
Olena Koltsova (UKR)	15

Round of 32
Aida Mohamed (HUN)	15
Yuko Arai (JPN)	6
Gabriella Lantos (HUN)	6
Monika Weber-Koszto (GER)	15
Felicia Zimmermann (USA)	8
Rita König (GER)	15
Olena Koltsova (UKR)	6
Sabine Bau (GER)	15

Round of 16
Aida Mohamed (HUN)	15
Monika Weber-Koszto (GER)	10
Rita König (GER)	15
Sabine Bau (GER)	11

Quarterfinals
Aida Mohamed (HUN)	8
Rita König (GER)	15

== Results ==
Rank	Fencer	Country
1st place, gold medalist(s)	Valentina Vezzali	Italy
2nd place, silver medalist(s)	Rita König	Germany
3rd place, bronze medalist(s)	Giovanna Trillini	Italy
4	Laura Cârlescu-Badea	Romania
5	Xiao Aihua	China
6	Diana Bianchedi	Italy
7	Aida Mohamed	Hungary
8	Reka Zsofia Lazăr-Szabo	Romania
9	Sabine Bau	Germany
10	Monika Weber-Koszto	Germany
11	Iris Zimmermann	United States
12	Meng Jie	China
13	Sylwia Gruchała	Poland
14	Magdalena Mroczkiewicz	Poland
15	Ayelet Ohayon	Israel
16	Ann Marsh	United States
17	Yekaterina Yusheva	Russia
18	Adeline Wuillème	France
19	Svetlana Boyko	Russia
20	Felicia Zimmermann	United States
21	Edina Knapek	Hungary
22	Anna Rybicka	Poland
23	Olga Sharkova-Sidorova	Russia
24	Gabriella Lantos	Hungary
25	Julie Mahoney	Canada
26	Yuko Arai	Japan
27	Yuan Li	China
28	Eloise Smith	Great Britain
29	Olena Koltsova	Ukraine
30	Seo Mi-Jeong	South Korea
31	Migsey Dussu	Cuba
32	Alejandra Carbone	Argentina
33	Miwako Shimada	Japan
34	Liudmyla Vasylieva	Ukraine
35	Jujie Luan	Canada
36	Olha Leleiko	Ukraine
37	Jo Halls	Australia
38	Nelya Sevostiyanova	Kazakhstan
39	Wassila Rédouane-Saïd-Guerni	Algeria
40	Shaimaa El-Gammal	Egypt
