= Argentina at the 1996 Summer Olympics =

- IOC code: ARG
- NOC: Argentine Olympic Committee
- Website: www.coarg.org.ar (in Spanish)

in Atlanta
- Competitors: 179 (132 men and 47 women) in 20 sports
- Flag bearer: Carolina Mariani
- Medals Ranked 54th: Gold 0 Silver 2 Bronze 1 Total 3

Summer Olympics appearances (overview)
- 1900; 1904; 1908; 1912; 1920; 1924; 1928; 1932; 1936; 1948; 1952; 1956; 1960; 1964; 1968; 1972; 1976; 1980; 1984; 1988; 1992; 1996; 2000; 2004; 2008; 2012; 2016; 2020; 2024; 2028

Argentina competed at the 1996 Summer Olympics in Atlanta, United States. 178 competitors, 131 men and 47 women, took part in 101 events in 20 sports.

== Medalists ==
Medal	Name	Sport	Event	Date
Silver	Argentina national football team: Matías Almeyda; Roberto Ayala; Christian Bassedas; Carlos Bossio; Pablo Cavallero; José Chamot; Hernán Crespo; Marcelo Delgado; Marcelo Gallardo; Claudio López; Gustavo López; Hugo Morales; Ariel Ortega; Pablo Paz; Mauricio Pineda; Roberto Sensini; Diego Simeone; Javier Zanetti	Football	Men's tournament	August 3
Silver	Carlos Espínola	Sailing	Men's Mistral	July 29
Bronze	Pablo Chacón	Boxing	Men's featherweight	August 2

== Competitors ==
The following is the list of number of competitors in the Games.

Sport	Men	Women	Total
Athletics	4	4	8
Basketball	12	0	12
Beach volleyball	2	0	2
Boxing	5	–	5
Canoeing	4	0	4
Cycling	9	1	10
Equestrian	5	0	5
Fencing	1	3	4
Field hockey	16	16	32
Football	18	0	18
Gymnastics	1	1	2
Judo	7	1	8
Rowing	17	5	22
Sailing	6	4	10
Shooting	3	3	6
Swimming	2	5	7
Tennis	4	4	8
Volleyball	12	0	12
Weightlifting	3	–	3
Wrestling	1	–	1
Total	132	47	179

== Athletics ==
Men

Athlete	Events	Heat		Quarterfinal		Semifinal		Final	
Athlete	Events	Result	Rank	Result	Rank	Result	Rank	Result	Rank
Andrés Charadia	Hammer	65.26	17	N/A				did not advance	
Carlos Gats	100 m	10.57	3	did not advance					
Carlos Gats	200 m	20.82	4 Q	20.84	7	did not advance			
Marcelo Pugliese	Discus	56.72	29	N/A				did not advance	
Antonio Silio	Marathon	N/A						did not finish	

Women

Athlete	Events	Heat		Quarterfinal		Semifinal		Final	
Athlete	Events	Result	Rank	Result	Rank	Result	Rank	Result	Rank
Andrea Ávila	Long jump	6.00	31	N/A				did not advance	
Griselda González	Marathon	N/A						2:35:12	19
Liliana Martinelli	Discus	55.68	35	N/A				did not advance	
Marta Orellana	800 m	2:04.99	–	N/A				did not advance	

== Basketball ==
=== Men's tournament ===
Squad

Argentina Men's National Basketball Team roster
Players
Coaches

Pos.	No.	Name	Age – Date of birth	Height	Club	Ctr.
PF	4	Marcelo Nicola	25 – May 12, 1971	2.07 m (6 ft 9 in)	Tau Cerámica	(Spain)
PG	5	Daniel Farabello	22 – October 18, 1973	1.93 m (6 ft 4 in)	Andino	(Argentina)
PF	6	Luis Villar	29 – March 15, 1967	2.03 m (6 ft 8 in)	Boca Juniors	(Argentina)
SF	7	Esteban de la Fuente	27 – November 18, 1968	1.97 m (6 ft 6 in)	Quilmes (MdP)	(Argentina)
SF	8	Ernesto Michel	25 – October 12, 1970	2.00 m (6 ft 7 in)	Gimnasia (CR)	(Argentina)
PG	9	Marcelo Milanesio	31 – February 11, 1965	1.88 m (6 ft 2 in)	Atenas	(Argentina)
SG	10	Juan Espil	28 – January 5, 1968	1.94 m (6 ft 4 in)	Atenas	(Argentina)
PF	11	Diego Osella	26 – September 14, 1969	1.94 m (6 ft 4 in)	Atenas	(Argentina)
C	12	Fabricio Oberto	21 – March 21, 1975	2.08 m (6 ft 10 in)	Atenas	(Argentina)
SF	13	Jorge Racca	24 – September 4, 1971	1.98 m (6 ft 6 in)	Olimpia (VT)	(Argentina)
SF	14	Esteban Pérez	27 – March 26, 1969	2.00 m (6 ft 7 in)	Peñarol (MdP)	(Argentina)
C	15	Rubén Wolkowyski	22 – September 30, 1973	2.08 m (6 ft 10 in)	Quilmes (MdP)	(Argentina)

Head coach

- (Argentina) Guillermo Vecchio

Assistant coaches

- (Argentina) Rubén Magnano
- (Argentina) Fernando Duró

Preliminary round

Pos	Team	Pld	W	L	PF	PA	PD	Pts	Qualification
1	United States (H)	5	5	0	522	345	+177	10	Quarterfinals
2	Lithuania	5	3	2	427	354	+73	8 (Note: Head-to-head record: Lithuania 1–0 Croatia)	Quarterfinals
3	Croatia	5	3	2	422	386	+36	8	Quarterfinals
4	China	5	2	3	360	502	−142	7 (Note: Head-to-head record: China 1–0 Argentina)	Quarterfinals
5	Argentina	5	2	3	351	396	−45	7	9th place playoff
6	Angola	5	0	5	280	379	−99	5	11th place playoff

Source: FIBA archive
Rules for classification: 1) points; 2) head-to-head points; 3) head-to-head goal average; 4) head-to-head number of points scored.
(H) Hosts
Notes:

20 July 1996

Report

United States	96–68	Argentina
Scoring by half: 46–44, 50–24
Pts: Robinson 18; Rebs: Robinson 7 Asts: Hill, Hardaway 5		Pts: Espil 27; Rebs: Nicola 4 Asts: Milanesio 7

Atlanta
Referees: Gennaro Colucci (ITA), Stylianos Koukoulekidis (GRE)

22 July 1996

Report

Argentina	65–61	Lithuania
Scoring by half: 31–25, 34–36
Pts: Espil 25; Rebs: Espil 6 Asts: Milanesio 6		Pts: Sabonis 30; Rebs: Sabonis 11; Asts: Marčiulionis 8

Atlanta
Referees: Carl Jungebrand (FIN), Juan Figueroa (PUR)

24 July 1996

Report

China	87–77	Argentina
Scoring by half: 51–38, 36–39
Pts: Zheng, Hu 22; Rebs: Zheng 9 Asts: Li 5		Pts: Espil 25; Rebs: Pérez 7 Asts: Milanesio 8

Atlanta
Referees: Robert Barnett (AUS), Roman Ryzhyk (UKR)

26 July 1996

Report

Argentina	75–90	Croatia
Scoring by half: 29–43, 46–47
Pts: Espil 17; Rebs: Osella 6 Asts: Milanesio 5		Pts: Komazec 28; Rebs: Kukoč 8 Asts: Komazec, Mulaomerović 3

Atlanta
Referees: Jose Piovesan Neto (BRA), Pascal Noel Dorizon (FRA)

28 July 1996

Report

Argentina	66–62	Angola
Scoring by half: 27–32, 39–30
Pts: Espil 21; Rebs: Villar 6 Asts: Osella 5		Pts: Dias 17; Rebs: Moreira Dias 7 Asts: Avô 4

Atlanta
Referees: Wieslaw Zych (POL), Chong Kyoung (KOR)

9th to 12th place classification

30 July 1996
15:00

Report

Argentina	97–79	South Korea
Scoring by half: 44–41, 53–38
Pts: Espil 26; Rebs: Pérez 9 Asts: Espil 8		Pts: J. K. Jung 17; Rebs: H. C. Chun 8 Asts: D. H. Kang 8

Atlanta
Referees: Joseph Derosa (USA), Zhu Jiazhong (CHN)

9th place classification

2 August 1996
12:00

Report

Argentina	87–77	Puerto Rico
Scoring by half: 43–38, 44–39
Pts: Espil, Osella 17; Rebs: Milanesio, Oberto 7 Asts: Milanesio, Espil 7		Pts: Ortiz 21; Rebs: Ortiz 11; Asts: Travieso 5

Atlanta
Referees: Davorin Nakic (CRO), Antonio Soares De Campos (ANG)

== Boxing ==
Athlete	Event	Round of 32	Round of 16	Quarterfinals	Semifinals	Final	
Athlete	Event	Opposition Result	Opposition Result	Opposition Result	Opposition Result	Opposition Result	Rank
Omar Andrés Narváez	Flyweight	Guzmán (DOM); W	Assous (ALG); L	did not advance			
Pablo Chacón	Featherweight	Gray (JAM); W	Lebon (MRI); W	Nagy (HUN); W	Kamsing (THA); L	did not advance	Bronze
Fabrizio Nieva	Lightweight	Agentho (UGA); W	Shin (KOR); L	did not advance			
Guillermo Saputo	Welterweight	Bae (KOR); L	did not advance				
Oscar Gómez	Light Middleweight	Tulaganov (UKR); L (RSC)	did not advance				

Key:

- RSC – Referee stopped contest

== Canoeing ==
=== Flatwater ===
Athlete	Event	Heats		Repechage		Semifinals		Final	
Athlete	Event	Time	Rank	Time	Rank	Time	Rank	Time	Rank
Javier Correa	Men's K-1 500 m	1:42.691	4	1:44.076	3 Q	1:42.071	7	did not advance	
Abelardo Sztrum	Men's K-1 1000 m	3:50.547	3 Q	Bye		3:44.587	6	did not advance	
Diego Cánepa, Sergio Mangín	Men's K-2 500 m	1:38.594	6	1:39.535	4 Q	1:37.177	9	did not advance	
Javier Correa, Abelardo Sztrum	Men's K-2 1000 m	3:49.864	5	3:34.244	1 Q	3:28.128	9	did not advance	

== Cycling ==
=== Mountain bike ===
Athlete	Event	Time	Rank
Lautaro Chávez	Men's cross-country	DNF	
Sandra Ambrosio	Women's cross-country	DNF	

=== Road ===
Athlete	Event	Time	Rank
Gustavo Artacho	Men's road race	DNF	
Rubén Pegorín	Men's road race	DNF	

=== Track ===
Pursuits

Athlete	Event	Qualifying		Quarterfinals		Semifinals		Finals	
Athlete	Event	Time	Rank	Opposition Time	Rank	Opposition Time	Rank	Time	Rank
Ángel Colla	Men's 1000 m time trial	N/A						1:06.619	17
Walter Pérez	Men's individual pursuit	4:30.715	7	4:22.826	8	did not advance			
Gabriel Curuchet, Gonzalo García, Walter Pérez, Edgardo Simón	Men's team pursuit	4:20.840	14	did not advance					

Points races

Athlete	Event	Points	Rank
Juan Curuchet	Men's points race	0	23

Key

- DNF – Did not finish
- OVT – Overtaken

== Equestrian ==
Athlete	Horse	Event	Qualifying		Final	
Athlete	Horse	Event	Penalties	Rank	Penalties	Rank
Julio Albarracín	Dinastía Pampero	Show jumping	12.00	=59	did not advance	
Federico Castaing	Landlord	Show jumping	28.00	79	did not advance	
Oscar Fuentes	Henry J. Speed	Show jumping	12.75	=67	did not advance	
Ricardo Kierkegaard	Renomme	Show jumping	4.50	35	did not advance	

== Fencing ==
Athlete	Event	Round of 64	Round of 32	Round of 16	Quarterfinals	Semifinals	Final
Athlete	Event	Opposition Result	Opposition Result	Opposition Result	Opposition Result	Opposition Result	Opposition Result
Leandro Marchetti	Men's individual foil	Falchetto (AUT); W 15–13	Wienand (GER); L 1–15	did not advance			
Alejandra Carbone	Women's individual foil	Wang (CHN); L 4–15	did not advance				
Yanina Iannuzzi	Women's individual foil	Parisky (ISR); L 7–15	did not advance				
Dolores Pampin	Women's individual foil	Szewczyk (POL); L 8–15	did not advance				
Alejandra Carbone, Yanina Iannuzzi, Dolores Pampin	Women's team foil	N/A		Russia; L 20–45	did not advance		

== Field hockey ==
=== Men ===
Team roster and tournament statistics

Coach: Miguel MacCormick

No.	Player	GP	G	S	FG	PC	PS	Green card	Yellow card	Red card
1	Pablo Moreira (GK)	7	0	0						
2	Jorge Querejeta	5	0	0						
3	Edgardo Pailos	7	0	0						
4	Diego Chiodo	5	0	0	1					
5	Alejandro Doherty	7	0	1						
6	Fernando Moresi	7	0	1						
7	Rodolfo Pérez	6	1	2	1					
8	Carlos Retegui	7	1	7	1					
9	Jorge Lombi	7	5	12	3	2	1			
10	Gabriel Minadeo	6	0	1						
11	Fernando Ferrara	7	4	13	3	1				
12	Leandro Baccaro	6	0	1						
13	Rodolfo Schmitt	1	0	0						
14	Santiago Capurro	5	2	5	2					
15	Maximiliano Caldas	7	0	0						
16	Pablo Lombi	7	1	2	1					
Team totals		7	16	45	12	3	1			

Legend: GP – Games Played; G – Goals; S – Shots; FG – Field Goals; PC – Penalty Corners; PS – Penalty Strokes; Green Cards; (yellow card) Yellow Cards; (red card) Red Cards

Preliminary Round (Pool A)

Team	Pld	W	D	L	GF	GA	Pts
Spain	5	4	0	1	14	5	8
Germany	5	3	1	1	10	3	7
India	5	2	2	1	8	3	5
Pakistan	5	2	1	2	11	8	5
Argentina	5	2	0	3	9	13	4
United States	5	0	0	5	3	23	0

Qualified for semifinals

July 20
20:00

India	0 – 1	Argentina
		P. Lombi 65'

Umpires:
Amin Ayman (EGY)
Peter von Reth (NED)

July 22
20:00

United States	2 – 5	Argentina
Mellor 39'; Jennings 47'		P. Lombi 4', 11'; Ferrara, Capurro 31'

Umpires:
Yuri Platonov (RUS)
Don Prior (AUS)

July 24
17:30

Spain	2 – 1	Argentina
Escarré 61'; Arnau 65'		P. Lombi 20'

Umpires:
Floris Idenburg (NED)
Peter von Reth (NED)

July 26
9:00

Germany	3 – 0	Argentina
Saliger 16'; Becker 19'; Bellenbaum 64'

Umpires:
Floris Idenburg (NED)
Don Prior (AUS)

July 28
9:00

Pakistan	6 – 2	Argentina
Ahmed 32', 45', 65'; Sarwar 51', 58'; Zaman 53'		Pérez 65'; J. Lombi 68'

Umpires:
Amin Ayman (EGY)
Craig Madden (GBR)

9th to 12th place classification

July 31
8:30

Argentina	4 – 4 (AET) 3 – 0 (PSO)	Malaysia
Retegui 14', 55'; Ferrara 57'; J. Lombi 69'		Singh 26'; Siva 38'; Nawawi 39'; Shanmuganathan 59'

Umpires:
Kiyoshi Sana (JPN)
Patrick van Beneden (BEL)

9th place match

August 1
8:30

Argentina	3 – 2	South Africa
Ferrara 30'; Capurro 36'; J. Lombi 45'		Nicol 22'; Hallowes 38'

Umpires:
Guillaume Langle (FRA)
Craig Madden (GBR)

=== Women ===
Team roster and tournament statistics

Coach: Rodolfo Mendoza

No.	Player	GP	G	S	FG	PC	PS	Green card	Yellow card	Red card
1	Mariana Arnal (GK)	4	0	0						
2	Sofía MacKenzie	7	2	0		2				
3	Magdalena Aicega	7	0	1						
4	Silvia Corvalán	7	0	0						
5	Anabel Gambero	7	0	1						
6	Julieta Castellán	7	0	0						
7	Gabriela Pando	7	0	0						
8	Gabriela Sánchez	7	0	2						
9	Vanina Oneto	6	0	7						
10	Jorgelina Rimoldi	7	2	7	2					
11	Karina Masotta (C)	7	2	4		1	1			
12	María Castelli	7	1	4		1				
13	Verónica Artica	3	0	0						
14	Cecilia Rognoni	5	0	1						
15	Ayelén Stepnik	2	0	1						
16	Mariana González Oliva	6	0	0						
Team totals		7	7	28	2	3	1			

Preliminary Round

Competed for the gold medal
Competed for the bronze medal

Team	Pld	W	D	L	GF	GA	Pts
Australia	7	6	1	0	24	4	13
South Korea	7	4	2	1	18	9	10
Great Britain	7	3	2	2	12	11	8
Netherlands	7	3	2	2	15	15	8
United States	7	2	2	3	8	11	6
Germany	7	2	1	4	10	11	5
Argentina	7	2	1	4	7	21	5
Spain	7	0	1	6	5	17	1

July 20
17:30

Argentina	0 – 2	Germany
		van Kooperen 17'; Lätzsch 39'

Umpires:
Renee Chatas (USA)
Janice McDonald (GBR)

July 22
09:00

Australia	7 – 1	Argentina
Farrell 9'; Powell 25'; Annan 34', 49', 50'; Roche 61'; Powell 63'		Rimoldi 43'

Umpires:
Carola Heinrichs (GER)
Angela Lario Ruiz (ESP)

July 23
11:00

Spain	0 – 1	Argentina
		Rimoldi 44'

Umpires:
Miriam van Gemert (NED)
Janice McDonald (GBR)

July 25
20:00

United States	1 – 2	Argentina
Marois 26'		Masotta 6'; MacKenzie 60'

Umpires:
Perl Buckley (AUS)
Carola Heinrichs (GER)

July 27
20:00

Netherlands	4 – 1	Argentina
Donners 5' de Ruiter 14', 45', 48'		Masotta 39'

Umpires:
Angela Lario Ruiz (ESP)
Gina Spitareli (ITA)

July 28
20:00

Argentina	2 – 2	South Korea
MacKenzie 10'; Castelli 16'		Eung Jung-Cho 33'; Eung Jung-Chang 46'

Umpires:
Renee Chatas (USA)
Margaret Lanning (CAN)

July 30
9:00

Argentina	0 – 5	Great Britain
		Nicholson 8', 69'; Sixsmith 13', 61', 68'

Umpires:
Perl Buckley (AUS)
Renee Chatas (USA)

== Football ==
Squad
Over aged players are marked with * (max 3).
Matches played in parentheses denotes player came from the bench.

#	Name	Club	Date of Birth	Pld	Goals	Y (yellow card)	Y/R (yellow card) (yellow-red card)	R (red card)
Goalkeepers
1	Carlos Bossio	(Argentina) Estudiantes de La Plata	December 1, 1973 (aged 22)	1	0	1	0	0
12	Pablo Cavallero	(Argentina) Vélez Sársfield	April 13, 1974 (aged 22)	5	0	0	0	0
Defenders
2	Roberto Ayala	(Spain) Valencia	April 14, 1973 (aged 23)	6	0	0	0	0
3	José Chamot*	(Italy) Lazio	May 17, 1969 (aged 27)	5	0	2	0	0
4	Javier Zanetti	(Italy) Internazionale	August 10, 1973 (aged 22)	6	0	0	0	0
6	Roberto Sensini*	(Italy) Parma	October 12, 1966 (aged 29)	5	0	1	0	0
Midfielders
5	Matías Almeyda	(Argentina) River Plate	December 21, 1973 (aged 22)	6	0	1	0	0
8	Diego Simeone*	(Spain) Atlético Madrid	April 28, 1970 (aged 26)	3 (3)	1	1	0	0
11	Hugo Morales	(Argentina) Lanús	July 30, 1974 (aged 21)	4	0	1	0	0
13	Mauricio Pineda	(Argentina) Boca Juniors	July 13, 1975 (aged 21)	1	0	0	0	0
14	Pablo Paz	(Argentina) Banfield	January 27, 1973 (aged 23)	1 (1)	0	1	0	0
15	Christian Bassedas	(Argentina) Vélez Sársfield	February 16, 1973 (aged 23)	3 (1)	0	1	0	0
15	Marcelo Gallardo	(Argentina) River Plate	January 18, 1976 (aged 20)	(4)	0	0	0	0
Forwards
7	Claudio López	(Spain) Valencia	July 17, 1974 (aged 22)	5 (1)	2	0	0	0
9	Hernán Crespo	(Italy) Parma	July 5, 1975 (aged 21)	6	6	1	0	0
10	Ariel Ortega	(Spain) Valencia	March 4, 1974 (aged 22)	6	2	1	0	0
16	Gustavo López	(Spain) Real Zaragoza	April 13, 1973 (aged 23)	2 (3)	1	0	0	0
17	Marcelo Delgado	(Argentina) Racing Club	March 24, 1973 (aged 23)	1 (1)	0	1	0	0
Coach
	(Argentina) Daniel Passarella		May 25, 1953 (aged 43)

Results

Preliminaries

July 20, 1996
15:00

Argentina	3–1	United States
G. López 26'; Crespo 55'; Simeone 90'	(Report)	Reyna 1'

Legion Field, Birmingham
Attendance: 83,183
Referee: Lucien Bouchardeau (Nigeria)

July 22, 1996
19:30

Argentina	1–1	Portugal
Ortega 41'	(Report)	Gomes 70'

RFK Memorial Stadium, Washington, D.C.
Attendance: 25,811
Referee: Omer Al Mehannah (Saudi Arabia)

July 24, 1996
19:30

Argentina	1–1	Tunisia
Ortega 6'	(Report)	Mkacher 75'

Legion Field, Birmingham
Attendance: 16,826
Referee: Pirom Un-Prasert (Thailand)

Quarterfinals

July 27, 1996
19:30

Argentina	4–0	Spain
Crespo 46', 88'; Aranzábal 53' (o. g.); C. López 66'	(Report)

Legion Field, Birmingham
Attendance: 43,507
Referee: Gamal Al-Ghandour (Egypt)

Semifinals

July 30, 1996
18:00

Portugal	0–2	Argentina
	(Report)	Crespo 55', 61'

Sanford Stadium, Athens
Attendance: 78,212
Referee: Esfandiar Baharmast (United States)

Gold Medal match

August 3, 1996
15:45

Nigeria	3–2	Argentina
Babayaro 28'; Amokachi 74'; Amuneke 90'	(Report)	C. López 3'; Crespo 50'

Sanford Stadium, Athens
Attendance: 86,117
Referee: Pierluigi Collina (Italy)

Silver Medal

== Gymnastics ==
=== Artistic ===
Athlete	Event	Apparatus								Qualification		Final	
Athlete	Event	Floor	Pommel Horse	Rings	Vault	Parallel Bars	Horizontal Bar	Uneven bars	Balance beam	Total	Rank	Total	Rank
Marcelo Palacio	Men's all-around	17.450	16.875	17.325	17.875	17.100	17.400	N/A		104.025	70	did not advance	
Marcelo Palacio	Floor	17.450	N/A							17.450	89	did not advance	
Marcelo Palacio	Pommel horse	N/A	16.875	N/A						16.875	86	did not advance	
Marcelo Palacio	Rings	N/A		17.325	N/A					17.325	90	did not advance	
Marcelo Palacio	Vault	N/A			17.785	N/A				17.785	94	did not advance	
Marcelo Palacio	Parallel bars	N/A				17.100	N/A			17.100	90	did not advance	
Marcelo Palacio	Horizontal bar	N/A					17.400	N/A		17.400	86	did not advance	
Ana Destéfano	Women's all-around	18.537	N/A		18.724	N/A		18.737	16.774	72.772	65	did not advance	
Ana Destéfano	Floor	18.537	N/A							18.537	71	did not advance	
Ana Destéfano	Vault	N/A			18.724	N/A				18.724	61	did not advance	
Ana Destéfano	Uneven bars	N/A						18.737	N/A	18.737	57	did not advance	
Ana Destéfano	Balance beam	N/A							16.774	16.774	86	did not advance	

== Judo ==
Men

Athlete	Event	Round of 32	Round of 16	Quarterfinals	Semifinals	Final	Repechage 1	Repechage 2	Repechage 3	Bronze
Athlete	Event	Opposition Result	Opposition Result	Opposition Result	Opposition Result	Opposition Result	Opposition Result	Opposition Result	Opposition Result	Opposition Result
Jorge Lencina	-60 kg	Huseynov (AZE); L	did not advance							
Francisco Morales	-65 kg	Revazishvili (GEO)	did not advance							
Sebastián Alquati	-71 kg	Boldbataar (MGL); L	did not advance				Pedro (USA); L	did not advance		
Dario García	-78 kg	Belgaïd (MAR); W	Klas (NED); W	Bouras (FRA); L	did not advance		Bye		Savchishkin (RUS); W	Uznadze (TUR); L
Pablo Elisii	-86 kg	Kaaba (MAR); L	Despaigne (CUB); L	did not advance						
Alejandro Bender	-95 kg	Miguel (BRA); L	did not advance				Shakimov (KAZ); W	Felicite (MRI); W	Kovács (HUN); L	did not advance
Orlando Baccino	+95 kg	Rakhimov (TJK); L	did not advance							

Women

Athlete	Event	Round of 32	Round of 16	Quarterfinals	Semifinals	Final	Repechage 1	Repechage 2	Repechage 3	Bronze
Athlete	Event	Opposition Result	Opposition Result	Opposition Result	Opposition Result	Opposition Result	Opposition Result	Opposition Result	Opposition Result	Opposition Result
Carolina Mariani	-52 kg	Bye	Gosselin (CAN); L	Hyun (KOR); L	did not advance		Bye	Giungi (ITA); W	Sugawara (JPN); L	did not advance

== Rowing ==
Men

Athlete(s)	Event	Heats		Repechage		Semifinals		Final	
Athlete(s)	Event	Time	Rank	Time	Rank	Time	Rank	Time	Rank
Sergio Fernández González	Single sculls	7:37.53	2	7:42.63	1 Q	7:23.70	5	did not advance	
Fernando Zapata, Agustín Rocha	Lightweight double sculls	7:07.50	4	6:28.08	3	did not advance			
Walter Balunek, Carlos Palavecino	Coxless pair	6:56.03	3	7:10.57	3 Q	7:14.59	6	did not advance	
Santiago Fernández, Rubén Knulst, Carlos Pages, Guillermo Pfaab	Quadruple sculls	6:16.16	4	5:52.89	4	did not advance			
Mariano Kowalczyk, Daniel Scuri, Horacio Sicilia, Mariano Sosa	Coxless four	6:33.29	5	6:37.85	5	did not advance			
Jorge Enríquez, Hernán Legizamón, Gabriel Scortiguini, Federico Querín	Lightweight coxless four	6:43.58	6	6:09.86	5	did not advance			

Women

Athlete(s)	Event	Heats		Repechage		Semifinals		Final	
Athlete(s)	Event	Time	Rank	Time	Rank	Time	Rank	Time	Rank
Ana Urbano	Single sculls	8:42.59	5	9:04.66	5	did not advance			
Dolores Amaya, María Garisoain	Double sculls	7:57.05	4	8:09.24	4	did not advance			
Lorena Corengia, Julieta Ramírez	Coxless pair	8:12.58	5	8:35.53	4	did not advance			

== Sailing ==
Men

Athlete	Event	Race											Score	Rank
Athlete	Event	1	2	3	4	5	6	7	8	9	10	11	Score	Rank
Carlos Espínola	Mistral	2	4	4	2	3	(6)	(47); PMS	2	2	N/A		19	Silver
Santiago Lange	Laser	4	1	5	14	23	11	19	(57); DSQ	2	19	4	79	9
Martín Billoch, Martín Rodríguez	470	12	(23)	1	(22)	20	3	4	12	1	8	12	73	7
Guillermo Calegari, Mauro Maiola	Star	17	17	(23)	(22)	19	22	18	17	19	17	N/A	146	22

Women

Athlete	Event	Race											Score	Rank
Athlete	Event	1	2	3	4	5	6	7	8	9	10	11	Score	Rank
Serena Amato	Europe	8	(17)	8	8	(16)	15	6	5	1	16	14	81	8
Mónica Fechino	Mistral	17	18	10	18	(25)	16	(20)	15	14	N/A		108	17
Paula Reinoso, Sofía Usandizaga	470	(23); PMS	16	16	(22)	22	20	17	20	22	17	20.50	170.50	22

Key

- DSQ – Disqualified
- PMS – Premature start

== Shooting ==
Men

Athlete	Event	Qualification		Final		Rank
Athlete	Event	Score	Rank	Score	Total	Rank
Ricardo Rusticucci	10 m air rifle	585	=26	did not advance		=26
Ricardo Rusticucci	50 m rifle three positions	1139	45	did not advance		45
Angel Velarte	10 m air rifle	577	=38	did not advance		=38
Angel Velarte	50 m rifle three positions	1142	44	did not advance		44
Marcelo Gil	Skeet	113	=45	did not advance		=45

Women

Athlete	Event	Qualification		Final		Rank
Athlete	Event	Score	Rank	Score	Total	Rank
Amelia Fournel	10 m air rifle	392	=13	did not advance		=13
Cristina Gallo	10 m air pistol	374	29	did not advance		29
Cristina Gallo	25 m pistol	565	33	did not advance		33
Lorena Guado	10 m air pistol	371	=32	did not advance		=32
Lorena Guado	25 m pistol	569	29	did not advance		29

== Swimming ==
Men

Athlete	Events	Heat		Final	
Athlete	Events	Time	Rank	Time	Rank
Agustín Fiorilli	400 m freestyle	4:02.53	28	did not advance	
Agustín Fiorilli	1500 m freestyle	15:51.85	26	did not advance	
José Meolans	50 m freestyle	23.21	23	did not advance	
José Meolans	100 m freestyle	52.02	45	did not advance	
José Meolans	100 m butterfly	56.02	38	did not advance	

Women

Athlete	Events	Heat		Final	
Athlete	Events	Time	Rank	Time	Rank
Valeria Alvarez	50 m freestyle	27.12	39	did not advance	
Valeria Alvarez	100 m freestyle	59.26	43	did not advance	
Valeria Alvarez	100 m backstroke	1:06.38	30	did not advance	
Alicia Barrancos	400 m freestyle	4:22.11	28	did not advance	
Alicia Barrancos	800 m freestyle	8:48.54	17	did not advance	
María del Pilar Pereyra	100 m butterfly	1:03.98	33	did not advance	
María del Pilar Pereyra	200 m butterfly	2:19.57	28	did not advance	
María Carolina Santa Cruz	100 m breaststroke	1:16.19	42	did not advance	
María Carolina Santa Cruz	200 m breaststroke	2:37.85	32	did not advance	
Valeria Álvarez, Alicia Barrancos, María Bertelloti, María del Pilar Pereyra	4 × 200 m freestyle relay	8:46.36	21	did not advance	
Valeria Álvarez, María Bertelloti, María del Pilar Pereyra, María Santa Cruz	4 × 100 m medley relay	4:27.99	23	did not advance	

== Tennis ==
Men

Athlete	Event	Round of 64	Round of 32	Round of 16	Quarterfinals	Semifinals	Final	
Athlete	Event	Opposition Score	Opposition Score	Opposition Score	Opposition Score	Opposition Score	Opposition Score	Rank
Gastón Etlis	Singles	Ferreira (RSA); L 4–6, 3–6	did not advance					=33
Javier Frana	Singles	Rusedski (GBR); L 6–4, 5–7, 3–6	did not advance					=33
Hernán Gumy	Singles	Pereira (VEN); L 4–6, 0–6	did not advance					=33
Javier Frana, Luis Lobo	Doubles	N/A	Bruguera (ESP); Carbonell (ESP); L 3–6, 6–7^{(6–8)}	did not advance				=17

Women

Athlete	Event	Round of 64	Round of 32	Round of 16	Quarterfinals	Semifinals	Final	
Athlete	Event	Opposition Score	Opposition Score	Opposition Score	Opposition Score	Opposition Score	Opposition Score	Rank
Inés Gorrochategui	Singles	Yi (CHN); W 6–2, 1–6, 6–1	Pierce (FRA); W 6–4, 1–6, 7–5	Fernández (USA); L 0–6, 3–6	did not advance			=9
Florencia Labat	Singles	Makarova (RUS); W 6–2, 7–5	Maleeva (BUL); L 6–7^{(7–9)}, 1–6	did not advance				=17
Gabriela Sabatini	Singles	Tauziat (FRA); W 7–5, 6–2	Gavaldón (MEX); W 6–4, 6–0	Seles (USA); L 3–6, 3–6	did not advance			=9
Gabriela Sabatini, Patricia Tarabini	Doubles	N/A	Appelmans (BEL); Courtois (BEL); L 7–5, 3–6, 4–6	did not advance				=17

== Volleyball ==
=== Beach ===
Athlete	Event	Round 1	Round 2	Round 3	Quarterfinals	Semifinals	Final	Standing
Athlete	Event	Opposition Score	Opposition Score	Opposition Score	Opposition Score	Opposition Score	Opposition Score	Standing
Martín Conde; Esteban Martínez	Men's	Bye	Álvarez – Rossell (CUB); L 11 – 15	did not advance				=13

=== Indoor ===
Roster

Coach: Alberto Armoa

Name	Date of birth
Marcos Milinkovic	December 22, 1971
Jorge Elgueta	November 21, 1969
Sebastián Jabif	January 24, 1973
Leandro Maly	January 29, 1976
Javier Weber	January 6, 1971
Fernando Borrero	December 15, 1968
Alejandro Romano	May 4, 1974
Sebastián Firpo	October 27, 1976
Pablo Pereira	January 18, 1974
Guillermo Martínez	January 18, 1969
Eduardo Rodríguez	December 15, 1971

Group play

Pos	Team	Pld	W	L	Pts	SW	SL	SR	SPW	SPL	SPR	Qualification
1	Cuba	5	4	1	9	12	5	2.400	233	191	1.220	Quarterfinals
2	Brazil	5	3	2	8	10	6	1.667	210	187	1.123	Quarterfinals
3	Bulgaria	5	3	2	8	10	8	1.250	225	212	1.061	Quarterfinals
4	Argentina	5	3	2	8	9	9	1.000	222	225	0.987	Quarterfinals
5	United States	5	2	3	7	10	9	1.111	241	233	1.034	
6	Poland	5	0	5	5	1	15	0.067	151	234	0.645	

July 21, 1996	Brazil	1–3	Argentina	Referees: Jarmo Salonen (Finland), Peter Henry (Canada)
July 21, 1996	(15–9, 8–15, 14–16, 6–15)			Referees: Jarmo Salonen (Finland), Peter Henry (Canada)

July 23, 1996	Argentina	0–3	United States	Referees: Patrick Rachard (France), Guennadi Zharikov (Russia)
July 23, 1996	(7–15, 8–15, 11–15)			Referees: Patrick Rachard (France), Guennadi Zharikov (Russia)

July 25, 1996; 12:30	Bulgaria	1–3	Argentina	Referees: Dean Turner (Australia), Petrus Scheffer (Netherlands)
July 25, 1996; 12:30	(10–15, 8–15, 15–11, 10–15)			Referees: Dean Turner (Australia), Petrus Scheffer (Netherlands)

July 27, 1996	Argentina	0–3	Cuba	Referees: Guennadi Zharikov (Russia), Patrick Rachard (France)
July 27, 1996	(10–15, 12–15, 9–15)			Referees: Guennadi Zharikov (Russia), Patrick Rachard (France)

July 29, 1996	Poland	1–3	Argentina	Referees: Abdullah Al-Khlaifi (Saudi Arabia), Petrus Scheffer (Netherlands)
July 29, 1996	(15–7, 15–17, 10–15, 9–15)			Referees: Abdullah Al-Khlaifi (Saudi Arabia), Petrus Scheffer (Netherlands)

Quarterfinal

July 31, 1996	Argentina	1–3	Italy	Referees: Barry Dragon (United States), Patrick Rachard (France)
July 31, 1996	(15–12, 9–15, 7–15, 4–15)			Referees: Barry Dragon (United States), Patrick Rachard (France)

5th to 8th place classification

August 1, 1996	Brazil	3–1	Argentina	Referees: Konstantinos Margaritis (Greece), Jarmo Salonen (Finland)
August 1, 1996	(15–10, 15–3, 13–15, 15–9)			Referees: Konstantinos Margaritis (Greece), Jarmo Salonen (Finland)

8th place match

August 2, 1996	Bulgaria	3–2	Argentina	Referees: Neill Luebke (United States), Peter Henry (Canada)
August 2, 1996	(10–15, 10–15, 15–7, 15–7, 18–20)			Referees: Neill Luebke (United States), Peter Henry (Canada)

== Weightlifting ==
Women

Athlete	Event	Snatch	Clean & Jerk	Total	Rank
Gustavo Majauskas	Men's –64 kg	125.0	160.0	285.0	20
Marcelo Gandolfo	Men's –70 kg	120.0	140.0	160.0	24
Gabriel Lemme	Men's –70 kg	0.0	0.0	0.0	DNQ

Key

- DNQ – Did not qualify

== Wrestling ==
Athlete	Event	1/8 final	Quarterfinals	Semifinals	Final
Athlete	Event	Opposition Result	Opposition Result	Opposition Result	Opposition Result
Paulo Ibire	Men's freestyle 68 kg	Hwang Sang-Ho (KOR); L 0 – 7	did not advance		

== See also ==
- Argentina at the 1995 Pan American Games
