= Fencing at the 1996 Summer Olympics – Women's team foil =

Fencing at the Olympics

Women's team foil at the Games of the XXVI Olympiad
- Venue: Georgia World Congress Center
- Dates: 25 July 1996
- Competitors: 33 from 11 nations

Medalists
1st place, gold medalist(s)		Francesca Bortolozzi-Borella, Giovanna Trillini, Valentina Vezzali	Italy
2nd place, silver medalist(s)		Laura Cârlescu-Badea, Reka Zsofia Lazăr-Szabo, Roxana Scarlat	Romania
3rd place, bronze medalist(s)		Anja Fichtel-Mauritz, Monika Weber-Koszto, Sabine Bau	Germany

The women's team foil was one of ten fencing events on the fencing at the 1996 Summer Olympics programme. It was the tenth appearance of the event. The competition was held on 25 July 1996. 33 fencers from 11 nations competed.

== Brackets ==
1/16
08:30
Italy
bye
08:30
China	45
Israel	29
08:30
Hungary
bye
08:30
France
bye
08:30
Romania
bye
08:30
Russia	45
Argentina	20
08:30
Germany
bye
08:30
Poland	45
United States	44

Quarterfinals
10:00
Italy	45
China	26
10:00
Hungary	45
France	26
10:00
Romania	45
Russia	41
10:00
Germany	45
Poland	35

Semifinals
11:25
Italy	45
Hungary	42
11:25
Romania	45
Germany	33

Gold medal final
19:50
Italy	45
Romania	33
Bronze medal final
18:30
Hungary	42
Germany	45

== Rosters ==
Argentina - 11th place

- Alejandra Carbone
- Yanina Iannuzzi
- Dolores Pampin

China - 7th place

- Liang Jun
- Wang Huifeng
- Xiao Aihua

France - 5th place

- Adeline Wuillème
- Clothilde Magnan
- Laurence Modaine-Cessac

Germany

- Anja Fichtel-Mauritz
- Monika Weber-Koszto
- Sabine Bau

Hungary - 4th place

- Aida Mohamed
- Gabriella Lantos
- Zsuzsa Némethné Jánosi

Israel - 9th place

- Ayelet Ohayon
- Lilach Parisky
- Lydia Czuckermann-Hatuel

Italy

- Francesca Bortolozzi-Borella
- Giovanna Trillini
- Valentina Vezzali

Poland - 8th place

- Anna Rybicka
- Barbara Wolnicka-Szewczyk
- Katarzyna Felusiak

Romania

- Laura Cârlescu-Badea
- Reka Zsofia Lazăr-Szabo
- Roxana Scarlat

Russia - 6th place

- Olga Sharkova-Sidorova
- Olga Velichko
- Svetlana Boyko

United States - 10th place

- Ann Marsh
- Felicia Zimmermann
- Suzanne Paxton
