= Fencing at the 2000 Summer Olympics – Women's team foil =

Fencing at the Olympics

Women's team foil at the Games of the XXVII Olympiad
- Venue: Sydney Exhibition Centre
- Dates: 23 September
- Competitors: 29 from 9 nations

Medalists
1st place, gold medalist(s)		Diana Bianchedi, Giovanna Trillini, Valentina Vezzali	Italy
2nd place, silver medalist(s)		Sylwia Gruchała, Magdalena Mroczkiewicz, Anna Rybicka, Barbara Wolnicka-Szewczyk	Poland
3rd place, bronze medalist(s)		Sabine Bau, Rita König, Monika Weber-Koszto	Germany

The women's team foil was one of ten fencing events on the fencing at the 2000 Summer Olympics programme. It was the eleventh appearance of the event. The competition was held on 23 September 2000. 29 fencers from 9 nations competed.

== Medalists ==
Gold:	Silver:	Bronze:
Italy; Diana Bianchedi; Giovanna Trillini; Valentina Vezzali	Poland; Sylwia Gruchała; Magdalena Mroczkiewicz; Anna Rybicka; Barbara Wolnicka-Szewczyk	Germany; Sabine Bau; Rita König; Monika Weber-Koszto

=== Main tournament bracket ===
The field of 9 teams competed in a single-elimination tournament to determine the medal winners. Semifinal losers proceeded to a bronze medal match. Matches were also conducted to determine the final team placements.

Round of 16
Italy; Diana Bianchedi; Giovanna Trillini; Valentina Vezzali	-
Bye	-
Canada; Sherraine Schalm-MacKay; Julie Mahoney; Jujie Luan	35
Ukraine; Liudmyla Vasylieva; Olena Koltsova; Olha Leleiko	45
United States; Ann Marsh; Iris Zimmermann; Felicia Zimmermann	-
Bye	-
Bye	-
Hungary; Edina Knapek; Gabriella Lantos; Aida Mohamed	-
China; Xiao Aihua; Meng Jie; Yuan Li; Zhang Lei	-
Bye	-
Bye	-
Poland; Sylwia Gruchała; Magdalena Mroczkiewicz; Anna Rybicka; Barbara Wolnicka-Szewczyk	-
Russia; Svetlana Boyko; Yekaterina Yusheva; Olga Sharkova-Sidorova	-
Bye	-
Bye	-
Germany; Sabine Bau; Rita König; Monika Weber-Koszto	-

Quarterfinals
Italy; Diana Bianchedi; Giovanna Trillini; Valentina Vezzali	45
Ukraine; Liudmyla Vasylieva; Olena Koltsova; Olha Leleiko	39
United States; Ann Marsh; Iris Zimmermann; Felicia Zimmermann	45
Hungary; Edina Knapek; Gabriella Lantos; Aida Mohamed	41
China; Xiao Aihua; Meng Jie; Yuan Li	43
Poland; Sylwia Gruchała; Magdalena Mroczkiewicz; Anna Rybicka	45
Russia; Svetlana Boyko; Yekaterina Yusheva; Olga Sharkova-Sidorova	35
Germany; Sabine Bau; Rita König; Monika Weber-Koszto	45

Semifinals
Italy; Diana Bianchedi; Giovanna Trillini; Valentina Vezzali	45
United States; Ann Marsh; Iris Zimmermann; Felicia Zimmermann	38
Poland; Sylwia Gruchała; Magdalena Mroczkiewicz; Anna Rybicka	45
Germany; Sabine Bau; Rita König; Monika Weber-Koszto	34

Gold medal final
Italy; Diana Bianchedi; Giovanna Trillini; Valentina Vezzali	45
Poland; Sylwia Gruchała; Magdalena Mroczkiewicz; Barbara Wolnicka-Szewczyk	36
Bronze medal final
Germany; Sabine Bau; Rita König; Monika Weber-Koszto	45
United States; Ann Marsh; Iris Zimmermann; Felicia Zimmermann	42

=== Classification 5-8 ===
Placement 5-6
Ukraine; Liudmyla Vasylieva; Olena Koltsova; Olha Leleiko	39
Hungary; Edina Knapek; Gabriella Lantos; Aida Mohamed	45
China; Xiao Aihua; Meng Jie; Yuan Li	33
Russia; Svetlana Boyko; Yekaterina Yusheva; Olga Sharkova-Sidorova	45

Fifth place match
Russia; Svetlana Boyko; Yekaterina Yusheva; Olga Sharkova-Sidorova	45
Hungary; Edina Knapek; Gabriella Lantos; Aida Mohamed	38
Third place
Ukraine; Liudmyla Vasylieva; Olena Koltsova; Olha Leleiko	40
China; Xiao Aihua; Zhang Lei; Yuan Li	45

=== Classification 9-11 ===
Placement 9-11
Canada; Sherraine Schalm-MacKay; Julie Mahoney; Jujie Luan	Bye
-	-
-
-

Ninth place match
-
-
Canada; Sherraine Schalm-MacKay; Julie Mahoney; Jujie Luan	Bye
Third place
-	-
-
