= Fencing at the 2004 Summer Olympics – Women's foil =

Women's foil at the Games of the XXVIII Olympiad
- Venue: Helliniko Olympic Complex
- Date: 18 August 2004
- Competitors: 25 from 20 nations

Medalists
1st place, gold medalist(s)		Valentina Vezzali	Italy
2nd place, silver medalist(s)		Giovanna Trillini	Italy
3rd place, bronze medalist(s)		Sylwia Gruchała	Poland

These are the results of the women's foil competition in fencing at the 2004 Summer Olympics in Athens. A total of 25 women competed in this event. Competition took place in the Fencing Hall at the Helliniko Olympic Complex on August 18.

== Tournament results ==
The field of 25 fencers competed in a single-elimination tournament to determine the medal winners. Semifinal losers proceeded to a bronze medal match. As there were less than 32 entrants in this event, seven fencers had byes in the first round.

Round of 32
Mariana González (VEN)	14
Erinn Smart (USA)	12
Adeline Wuillème (FRA)	15
Vita Siltchenko (BLR)	4
Simone Bauer (GER)	15
Ayelet Ohayon (ISR)	10
Meng Jie (CHN)	15
Wassila Redouane Saïd-Guerni (ALG)	12
Chieko Sugawara (JPN)	15
Alejandra Carbone (ARG)	6
Gabriella Varga (HUN)	15
Chang Ying Man (HKG)	3
Svetlana Boyko (RUS)	13
Shaimaa El Gammal (EGY)	7
Ekaterina Youcveva (RUS)	15
Maria Rentoumi (GRE)	4
Nam Hyun-Hee (KOR)	15
Maria de Castro Herklotz (BRA)	6

Round of 16
Valentina Vezzali (ITA)	15
Mariana González (VEN)	4
Adeline Wuillème (FRA)	15
Margherita Granbassi (ITA)	9
Sylwia Gruchała (POL)	15
Simone Bauer (GER)	9
Laura Badea (ROU)	15
Meng Jie (CHN)	11
Giovanna Trillini (ITA)	15
Chieko Sugawara (JPN)	2
Gabriella Varga (HUN)	15
Svetlana Boiko (RUS)	9
Aida Mohamed (HUN)	14
Ekaterina Youcveva (RUS)	9
Nam Hyun-Hee (KOR)	15
Roxana Scarlat (ROU)	7

Quarterfinals
Valentina Vezzali (ITA)	15
Adeline Wuillème (FRA)	8
Sylwia Gruchała (POL)	15
Laura Badea (ROU)	7
Giovanna Trillini (ITA)	15
Gabriella Varga (HUN)	11
Aida Mohamed (HUN)	15
Nam Hyun-Hee (KOR)	5

Semifinals
Valentina Vezzali (ITA)	15
Sylwia Gruchała (POL)	13
Giovanna Trillini (ITA)	15
Aida Mohamed (HUN)	7

Gold medal final
Valentina Vezzali (ITA)	15
Giovanna Trillini (ITA)	11
Bronze medal final
Sylwia Gruchała (POL)	15
Aida Mohamed (HUN)	9

== Results ==
Rank	Fencer	Country
1st place, gold medalist(s)	Valentina Vezzali	Italy
2nd place, silver medalist(s)	Giovanna Trillini	Italy
3rd place, bronze medalist(s)	Sylwia Gruchała	Poland
4	Aida Mohamed	Hungary
5	Laura Cârlescu-Badea	Romania
6	Gabriella Varga	Hungary
7	Adeline Wuillème	France
8	Nam Hyeon-Hui	South Korea
9	Roxana Scarlat	Romania
10	Margherita Granbassi	Italy
11	Svetlana Boiko	Russia
12	Yekaterina Yusheva	Russia
13	Meng Jie	China
14	Simone Bauer	Germany
15	Chieko Sugawara	Japan
16	Mariana González	Venezuela
17	Erinn Smart	United States
18	Alejandra Carbone	Argentina
19	Ayelet Ohayon	Israel
20	Maju Herklotz	Brazil
21	Wassila Rédouane-Saïd-Guerni	Algeria
22	Maria Rentoumi	Greece
23	Shaimaa El-Gammal	Egypt
24	Vita Silchenko	Belarus
25	Chan Ying Man	Hong Kong
