= Ayelet Ohayon =

Israeli fencer (born 1974)

Personal information
- Born: איילת אוחיון; October 20, 1974 (age 51) Acre, Israel
- Height: 5 ft 3 in (160 cm)
- Weight: 108 lb (49 kg)

Sport
- Country: Israel
- Sport: Fencing
- Event: Foil
- Club: Hapoel Acre
- Coached by: Haim Hatuel

Ayelet Ohayon (Hebrew: איילת אוחיון; born October 20, 1974) is a three-time Olympian Israeli foil fencer. She also won the silver medal at the 1993 Junior World Cup Championships, the gold medal at the 2000 European Championships, and a gold medal at the 2009 Maccabiah Games in women's team foil, as part of Team Israel.

== Early life ==
Ohayon was born in Acre, Israel, and is Jewish. She started fencing because her brother was active in the sport. She completed her service in the Israel Defense Forces in 1996, and attended West Galilee College in Acre.

== Fencing career ==
Ohayon was coached by Haim Hatuel. She won the silver medal at the 1993 Junior World Cup Championships.

She finished 8th in the 1995 European Championships, and 7th in the individual foil at the 1996 and 1997 European Championships.

She finished 7th at the 1997 World Cup Championships. At the 1999 World Championships, she finished 20th in foil.

Ohayon won the gold medal at the 2000 European Championships. At the 2002 World Championships, she finished 15th in women's foil.

=== Olympics ===
She competed in foil for Israel at the 1996 Summer Olympics in Atlanta at 21 years of age, defeating Carmen Rodríguez of Guatemala in Round One, but losing in Round Two. In women's team foil, she fenced against China and the United States, defeating Suzanne Paxton of the US, as Israel came in 9th.

She competed in foil again for Israel at the 2000 Summer Olympics in Sydney, ranked 40th in the world. There, she received a bye in the First Round, defeated Adeline Wuillème of France in the Second Round, and was eliminated in the Third Round.

She competed in foil also for Israel at the 2004 Summer Olympics in Athens, where she was ranked 19th. There, she lost in the First Round. She said: "my preparations have gone down the drain. Everything I invested in my whole childhood has gone down the drain. My entire life from age 5 ends here."

=== Maccabiah Games ===
She won a gold medal at the 2009 Maccabiah Games in women's team foil, as part of Team Israel.

== See also ==
- List of select Jewish fencers
