= Herklotz =

Herklotz is a surname. Notable people with the surname include:

- Silvio Herklotz (born 1994), German cyclist
- Maju Herklotz (born 1975), Brazilian fencer

== See also ==
- Herklots
