= Lilach Parisky =

Israeli fencer

Personal information
- Native name: לילך פריזקי
- Born: 21 July 1972 (age 53) Israel

Sport
- Country: Israel
- Sport: Fencing

Lilach Parisky (Hebrew: לילך פריזקי; born 21 July 1972) is an Israeli Olympic fencer.

== Fencing career ==
Parisky came in 17th in foil at the 1993 World Fencing Championships.

She competed in the women's individual and team foil events for Israel at the 1996 Summer Olympics in Atlanta, at 24 years of age.

In the individual women's foil event, Parisky won in the first round, defeating Yanina Iannuzzi of Argentina, but lost in the second round. In the first round of the team foil event, against China she went 1-1-1 (defeating Liang Jun and tying with Xiao Aihua). In the second round against the United States she went 1–2 (defeating Felicia Zimmermann), as Israel came in 9th.

Parisky came in 20th in foil at the 1998 World Fencing Championships. She then came in 41st in foil at the 1999 World Fencing Championships.
