= Frida Scarpa =

Italian fencer

Personal information
- Born: 9 September 1976 (age 49) Genoa, Italy

Fencing career
- Sport: Fencing
- Country: Italy
- Weapon: Foil
- Hand: Right-handed
- Club: G.S. Forestale
Medal record
Women's fencing
Representing Italy
International podiums
Event	1st	2nd	3rd
World Championships	1	0	0
European Championships	0	1	1
Universiade	1	2	0
Mediterranean Games	0	1	0
Total	2	4	1

Frida Scarpa (born 6 September 1976) is a former Italian fencer who won the World Championships with the national foil team in 2001, and two medals (a bronze individual in 1996 and silver with the team in 2003) at the European Championships.

== Biography ==
Genoese by birth but Venetian by adoption, world champion in Nimes 2001 with the azzurro dream foil team: Valentina Vezzali, Giovanna Trillini and Diana Bianchedi (in that circumstance she replaced the injured Margherita Granbassi), after her sports career she got married with the teammate and Olympic champion with the team foil at Athens 2004 Salvatore Sanzo, the couple had two children, Virginia (born 2005) and Alessandro (born 2007).

She embarked on a career as attorney in law and then, once separated from her husband, she continued to live in Pisa, city of Salvatore Sanzo and where her children lives. In her city of residence, Pisa, in 2021 she was the protagonist of the TV show of the Italian television Real Time Cortesie per gli ospiti, winning the episode's competition.

== Achievements ==
Year	Competition	Venue	Rank	Event	Notes
1995	Universiade	(Japan) Fukuoka	2nd	Team foil	
1996	European Championships	(France) Limoges	3rd	Foil	
1997	Universiade	(Italy) Catania	2nd	Team foil	
1999	Universiade	(Spain) Palma de Mallorca	1st	Team foil	
2001	World Championships	(France) Nimes	1st	Team foil	
2001	Mediterranean Games	(Tunisia) Tunis	2nd	Foil	
2003	European Championships	(Belgium) Bruges	2nd	Team foil	
