= 2001 World Fencing Championships =

International fencing competition

2001 World Championships in Fencing
- Dates: October 26 – November 1
- Host city: Nîmes, France

The 2001 World Fencing Championships were held in Nîmes, France. The event took place from October 26 to November 1, 2001.

== Medal table ==
* Host nation (France)

Rank	Nation	Gold	Silver	Bronze	Total
1	Italy (ITA)	4	1	1	6
1	Russia (RUS)	4	1	1	6
3	France (FRA)*	2	3	5	10
4	Germany (GER)	1	1	2	4
5	Hungary (HUN)	1	1	1	3
6	Switzerland (SUI)	0	2	1	3
7	Romania (ROU)	0	1	2	3
8	Poland (POL)	0	1	1	2
9	Estonia (EST)	0	1	0	1
10	Azerbaijan (AZE)	0	0	1	1
10	Cuba (CUB)	0	0	1	1
10	Sweden (SWE)	0	0	1	1
10	United States (USA)	0	0	1	1
Totals (13 entries)		12	12	18	42

== Medal summary ==
=== Men's events ===
Event	Gold	Silver	Bronze
Épée	(Italy) Paolo Milanoli	(Switzerland) Basil Hoffmann	(France) Fabrice Jeannet (Germany) Oliver Lücke
Foil	(Italy) Salvatore Sanzo	(France) Loïc Attely	(France) Brice Guyart (France) Franck Boidin
Sabre	(Russia) Stanislav Pozdnyakov	(France) Julien Pillet	(France) Mathieu Gourdain (Poland) Rafal Sznajder
Team Épée	Hungary; Krisztián Kulcsár; Iván Kovács; Géza Imre; Attila Fekete	Estonia; Kaido Kaaberma; Nikolai Novosjolov; Sergei Vaht; Meelis Loit	France; Fabrice Jeannet; Hugues Obry; Rémy Delhomme; Jérôme Jeannet
Team Foil	France; Loïc Attely; Jean-Noël Ferrari; Brice Guyart; Franck Boidin	Poland; Adam Krzesiński; Sławomir Mocek; Tomasz Ciepły; Piotr Kielpikowski	Cuba; Elvis Gregory; Oscar García; Raúl Perojo; Eddy Patterson
Team Sabre	Russia; Stanislav Pozdnyakov; Sergey Sharikov; Aleksey Frosin; Aleksey Dyachenko	Hungary; Domonkos Ferjancsik; Kende Fodor; Balázs Lengyel; Zsolt Nemcsik	Romania; Mihai Covaliu; Florin Zalomir; Florin Lupeică; Victor Găureanu

=== Women's events ===
Event	Gold	Silver	Bronze
Épée	(Germany) Claudia Bokel	(France) Laura Flessel-Colovic	(Sweden) Maria Isaksson (Switzerland) Gianna Hablützel-Bürki
Foil	(Italy) Valentina Vezzali	(Germany) Sabine Bau	(Romania) Roxana Scarlat (Russia) Ekaterina Youcheva
Sabre	(France) Anne-Lise Touya	(Italy) Ilaria Bianco	(Azerbaijan) Yelena Jemayeva (Italy) Gioia Marzocca
Team Épée	Russia; Tatyana Logunova; Anna Sivkova; Maria Mazina; Tatyana Fakhrutdinova	Switzerland; Gianna Hablützel-Bürki; Sophie Lamon; Diana Romagnoli; Tabea Steffen	Hungary; Ildikó Mincza; Tímea Nagy; Hajnalka Tóth; Adrienn Hormay
Team Foil	Italy; Diana Bianchedi; Giovanna Trillini; Valentina Vezzali; Frida Scarpa	Russia; Yekaterina Yusheva; Svetlana Boyko; Olga Lobyntseva; Julia Khakimova	United States; Erinn Smart; Ann Marsh; Iris Zimmermann; Felicia Zimmermann
Team Sabre	Russia; Yelena Nechayeva; Natalya Makeyeva; Irina Bazhenova; Elisaveta Gorst	Romania; Andreea Pelei; Cătălina Gheorghițoaia; Irina Drăghici	Germany; Sandra Benad; Sabine Thieltges; Doreen Häntzsch; Stefanie Kubissa
