= Ivan Georgiev =

Ivan Georgiev may refer to:

- Ivan Georgiev (musician)
- Ivan Georgiev, Bulgarian trap shooter; see Selin Ali

== See also ==
- Ivana Georgieva (born 1971), Bulgarian fencer
