= School of the Arts (Rochester, New York) =

Middle-high school in Rochester, New York

School of the Arts (SOTA)
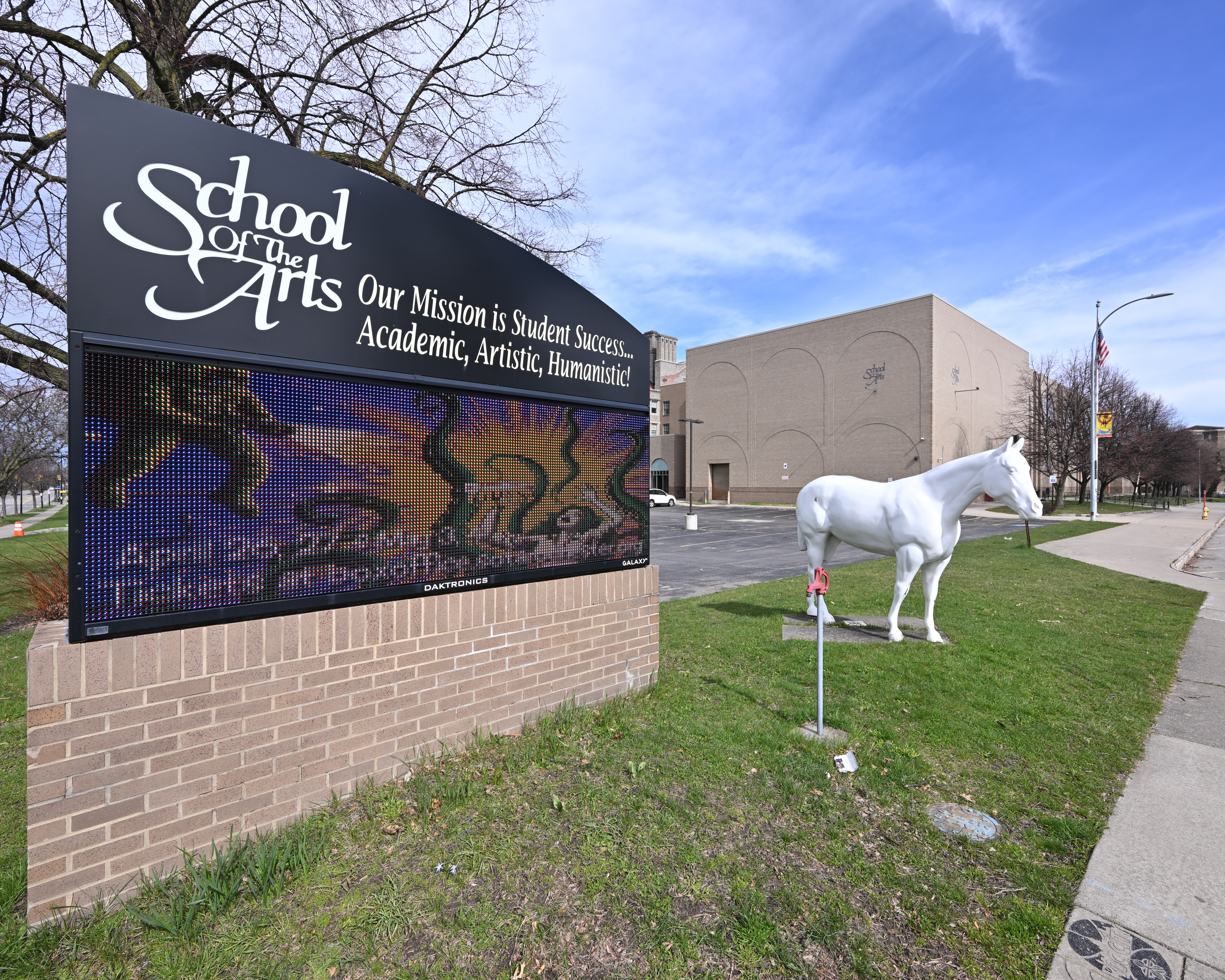

Location
- Rochester, New York
- Coordinates: 43.15843°N 77.590457°W

Information
- Type: Public,
- Motto: Academic, Artistic, and Humanistic
- School district: Rochester City School District
- Principal: Alan Tirre
- Staff: 166
- Grades: 7-12
- Enrollment: 1,058 (2023-2024)
- Colors: Black and silver
- Athletics: Basketball, Swimming, Soccer, Tennis, Baseball, Softball, Football, Cheerleading, Bowling, Track and Field, Cross Country, Volleyball, Lacrosse.
- Athletics conference: Section V City Catholic League
- Mascot: Silver Hawk
- Website: www.sotarochester.org

School of the Arts (SOTA) is a progressive alternative public middle school and high school in Rochester, New York. Administered by the Rochester City School District, SOTA is located on the corner of Prince Street and University Avenue, within walking distance of the Memorial Art Gallery, Eastman Theatre, Writers & Books, Visual Studies Workshop, and other cultural organizations.

== History ==
The School of the Arts was founded in 1980 as an experimental High School. In 1981, the school transferred to Monroe High School as was known as the School of the Arts at Monroe. Only grades 7-9 were represented that year. The school stayed at Monroe for many years, eventually becoming a full Jr-Sr. High School, while retaining the name "School of the Arts at Monroe." It eventually moved into its current space (the old Eastman School of Music dormitories at 45 Prince St.), in 1994, when it became "The School of the Arts".

== Academics ==
As in other schools, School Of The Arts has academic classes and arts classes. SOTA offers Honors and Advanced Placement(AP) classes, (Special) Education, Spanish 1,2,3 and 4-Honors. Students carry a full academic course load as well as a fine arts sequence. SOTA offers arts courses within several fine arts concentrations:

- Creative Writing
- Dance
- Drama
- Instrumental (Strings, Wind, Brass, and Percussion)
- Piano
- Theatre Technology
- Visual Arts
- Vocal

== Film and television ==
- SOTA was featured in the major motion picture Cherry Crush, where they used the lunch room, theatres, hallways and classroom as the "public school" setting for the main characters Jordan Wells played by Jonathan Tucker and Shay Bettencourt played by Nikki Reed.
- On June 4, 2009, SOTA received the Signature Schools Enterprise Award. They were one out of six schools that won the award, which comes with a $5,000 grant. During this award ceremony, students held a silent protest against planned budget cuts affecting the arts by standing in the lobby with their mouths covered with black duct tape.
- On June 9, 2009, SOTA students held another protest against the budget plan proposed by former Superintendent Brizard that slashed teaching positions. The students marched from school to RCSD headquarters and back to City Hall, where they performed things including tap dance, poetry reading, Jazz band, and choir outside of the entrance.

== Performances ==
SOTA puts on two musicals, two plays and a middle school play or musical each year, as well as an annual dance concert, music recitals, poetry readings/coffee houses, and other various art performances. The school has also begun celebrating Black History Month with a whole day full of performances dedicated to it.

== Notable alumni ==
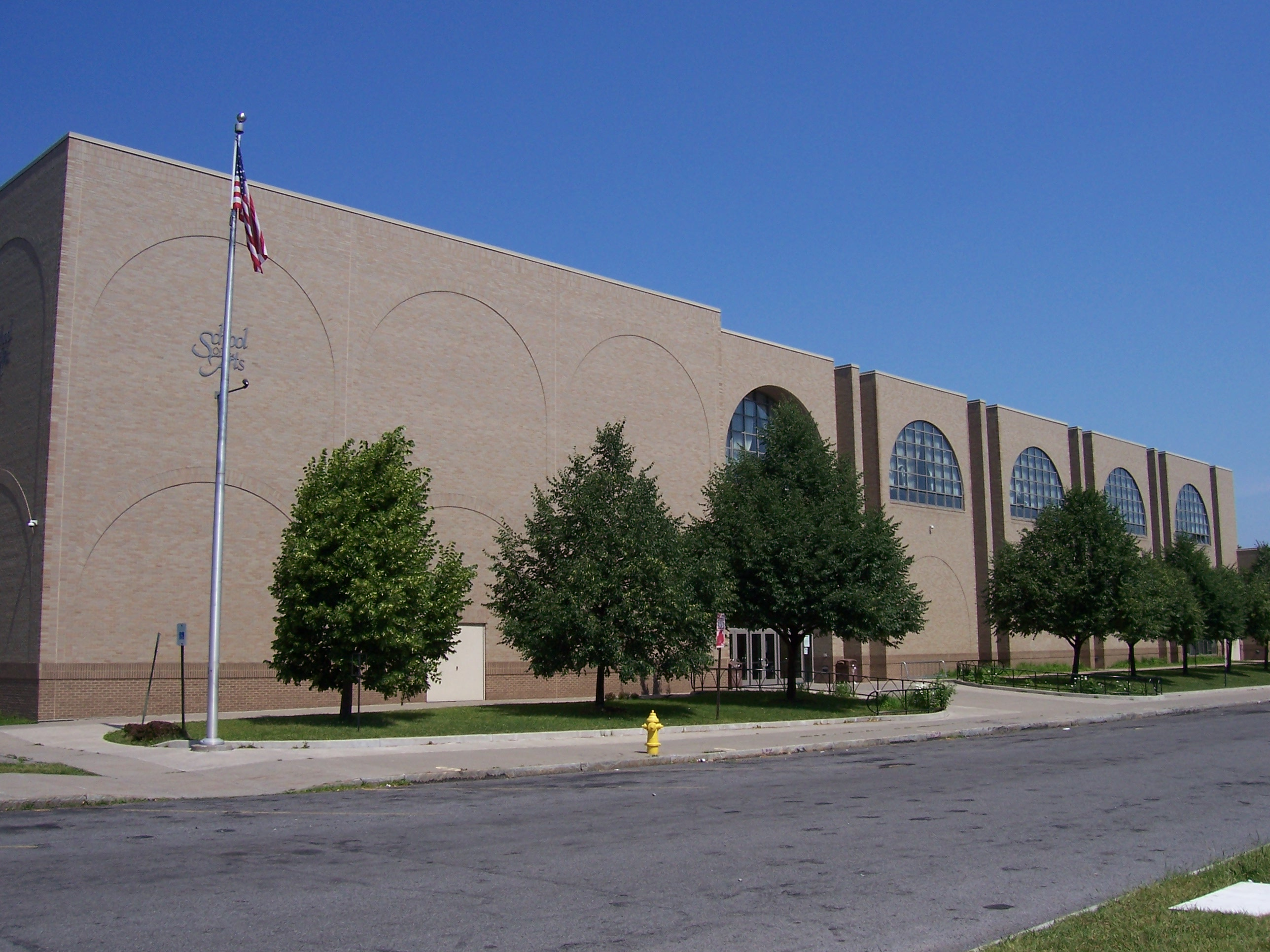
The school building

- Jeremy Cooney, New York State Senator
- Taye Diggs, actor
- Emma Cannon (born 1989), basketball player for the Israeli team Elitzur Ramla
- Charlene L. Keys, singer
- Peter Shukoff, comedian, musician, and Internet personality
- Iris Zimmermann Olympic fencer
- Felicia Zimmermann, Olympic fencer
- Qwanell “Que” Mosley - member of the R&B group Day26
- Timothy Mitchum, actor
