= 1996 European Fencing Championships =

Sports events

The 1996 European Fencing Championships were held in Limoges, France. The competition consisted of individual events only.

== Medal summary ==
=== Men's events ===
Event	Gold	Silver	Bronze
Foil	Lionel Plumenail (FRA)	Uwe Römer (GER)	Franck Boidin (FRA); João Gomes (POR)
Épée	Pavel Kolobkov (RUS)	Elmar Borrmann (GER)	Jean-François Di Martino (FRA); Viktor Zuikov (EST)
Sabre	Damien Touya (FRA)	Matthieu Gourdain (FRA)	Luigi Tarantino (ITA); Marcin Sobala (POL)

=== Women's events ===
Event	Gold	Silver	Bronze
Foil	Laura Badea (ROU)	Gabriella Lantos (HUN)	Anja Fichtel (GER); Frida Scarpa (ITA)
Épée	Magdalena Jeziorowska (POL)	Gianna Bürki (SUI)	Sangita Tripathi (FRA); Hajnalka Kiraly (HUN)

=== Medal table ===
Rank	Nation	Gold	Silver	Bronze	Total
1	France	2	1	3	6
2	Poland	1	0	1	2
3	Romania	1	0	0	1
3	Russia	1	0	0	1
5	Germany	0	2	1	3
6	Hungary	0	1	1	2
7	Switzerland	0	1	0	1
8	Italy	0	0	2	2
9	Estonia	0	0	1	1
9	Portugal	0	0	1	1
Totals (10 entries)		5	5	10	20
