= 1997 European Fencing Championships =

The 1997 European Fencing Championships were held in Gdańsk, Poland. The competition consisted of individual events only.

== Medal summary ==
=== Men's events ===
Event	Gold	Silver	Bronze
Épée	Gábor Boczkó (HUN)	Kaido Kaaberma (EST)	Bartłomiej Kurowski (POL); Peter Vanky (SWE)
Foil	Adam Krzesiński (POL)	Sergei Golubitsky (UKR)	Michael Ludwig (AUT); Jean-Noël Ferrari (FRA)
Sabre	Aleksey Frosin (RUS)	András Décsi (HUN)	Julien Pillet (FRA); Steffen Wiesinger (GER)

=== Women's events ===
Event	Gold	Silver	Bronze
Foil	Laura Badea (ROU)	Roxana Scarlat (ROU)	Monika Weber (GER); Anna Rybicka (POL)
Épée	Ildikó Mincza (HUN)	Katja Nass (GER)	Anna Femi (ITA); Monika Maciejewska (POL)

=== Medal table ===
Rank	Nation	Gold	Silver	Bronze	Total
1	Hungary	2	1	0	3
2	Romania	1	1	0	2
3	Poland	1	0	3	4
4	Russia	1	0	0	1
5	Germany	0	1	2	3
6	Estonia	0	1	0	1
6	Ukraine	0	1	0	1
8	France	0	0	2	2
9	Austria	0	0	1	1
9	Italy	0	0	1	1
9	Sweden	0	0	1	1
Totals (11 entries)		5	5	10	20
