= Uwe Römer =

German fencer

Personal information
- Full name: Uwe Römer
- Nationality: German
- Born: 4 April 1969 (age 57) Frankfurt, West Germany
- Website: Fahrschule Uwe Römer

Sport
- Country: Germany
- Sport: Fencing (Foil)
- Club: FC Tauberbischofsheim, SC Berlin
- Retired: yes
Medal record
World Championships
Silver medal – second place	1991 Budapest	Team foil
Gold medal – first place	1993 Essen	Team foil
Bronze medal – third place	1993 Essen	Individual foil
Silver medal – second place	1994 Athens	Team foil
European Championships
Silver medal – second place	1993 Linz	Individual foil
Silver medal – second place	1994 Kraków	Individual foil
Bronze medal – third place	1995 Keszthely	Individual foil
Silver medal – second place	1996 Limoges	Individual foil
Gold medal – first place	1998 Plovdiv	Team foil
German Championships
Gold medal – first place	1994	Individual foil
Gold medal – first place	1997	Individual foil

Uwe Römer (born 4 April 1969) is a German fencer. He competed in the individual and team foil events at the 1996 Summer Olympics.

Römer formerly competed for SC Berlin and FC Tauberbischofsheim. After retiring from his sports career, he established his own driving school in Tauberbischofsheim.
