= Sergei Vaht =

Estonian fencer

Sergei Vaht (born 25 February 1979) is an Estonian fencer. He was born in Belarus.

He began his fencing career in 1988, coached by Viktor Kirpu. He won a silver medal at 2001 World Fencing Championships in team épée. He has also won medals at the Estonian championships. From 2001 to 2008 he was a member of the Estonian national fencing team.
