= Boris Polak =

Israeli sport shooter

Boris Polak (Hebrew: בוריס פולק; born July 15, 1954) is an Israeli former world champion and Olympic sport shooter.

== Personal life ==
Polak is Jewish and was born in Moldova, in 1954. He made aliyah (immigrated to Israel) with his family from Alma Ata, Kazakhstan in 1992. He lives in Ashkelon, Israel, and is married with two children. He has worked, as a machinist and as a shooting coach.

== Shooting career ==
Polak started practicing shooting, and competing, in 1968, when he was 14 years old.

In 1980, after Polak came in 6th in the European Shooting Championships in Oslo in the AR (air rifle) 40M, the Soviet Union dropped him from its Olympic shooting team because some officials thought that at 26 years of age he was too old. He stopped shooting, and for the next seven years served as a border guard in the Red Army on a mountain top near China, attaining the rank of Colonel.

After moving to Israel, while he had not shot competitively for several years, in 1993 Polak won the bronze medal for Israel in the European Shooting Championships.

In 1994, he became a world champion, as he won gold medals at both the ISSF World Shooting Championships in Milan, Italy (in the AR 60, with a total score of 691.1, ahead of Anatoli Klimenko of Belarus) and the European Shooting Championships, set two world records, and won the gold medal in the Milan World Cup with a score of 695.2 in the AR60. Polak scored 591 in the standing and kneeling position, and 280 in the kneeling position.

Polak competed for Israel at the 1996 Summer Olympics, in Atlanta, at the age of 42 the oldest member of the Israeli Olympic team, in Shooting. In the Men's Small-Bore Rifle, Prone, 50 metres, he came in tied for 20th with 594 total points. In the Men's Small-Bore Rifle, Three Positions, 50 metres, he came in tied for 22nd with 1,162 total points. And in the Men's Air Rifle, 10 metres, he came in tied for 33rd with a score of 581. When he competed in the Olympics, he was 5 feet 8 inches (173 cm) tall, and weighed 174 pounds (79 kg).

In 1999, Polak won the Milan World Cup in the FR60PR, with a score of 701.7.
