= Fencing at the 2001 Mediterranean Games =

Fencing at the 2005 Mediterranean Games

== Medallists ==
=== Individual Foil ===
Rank	Final
1st place, gold medalist(s)	Salvatore Sanzo (ITA)
2nd place, silver medalist(s)	Marco Ramacci (ITA)
3rd place, bronze medalist(s)	Maher Ben Aziza (TUN)
3rd place, bronze medalist(s)	Jean Noel Ferrari (FRA)

=== Individual Epée ===
Rank	Final
1st place, gold medalist(s)	Paolo Milanoli (ITA)
2nd place, silver medalist(s)	Jose Luis Abajo (ESP)
3rd place, bronze medalist(s)	Stephane Leroy (FRA)
3rd place, bronze medalist(s)	Eduardo Sepulveda Puerto (ESP)

== Women's competition ==
=== Individual Foil ===
Rank	Final
1st place, gold medalist(s)	Valentina Vezzali (ITA)
2nd place, silver medalist(s)	Frida Scarpa (ITA)
3rd place, bronze medalist(s)	Maria Rentoumi (GRE)
3rd place, bronze medalist(s)	Adeline Wuilleme (FRA)

=== Individual Epée ===
Rank	Final
1st place, gold medalist(s)	Cristiana Cascioli (ITA)
2nd place, silver medalist(s)	Rosa Castillejo (ESP)
3rd place, bronze medalist(s)	Zahra Gamir (ALG)
3rd place, bronze medalist(s)	Elena Torrecilla (ESP)

== Medal table ==
Place	Nation	1st place, gold medalist(s)	2nd place, silver medalist(s)	3rd place, bronze medalist(s)	Total
1	Italy	4	2	0	6
2	Spain	0	2	2	4
3	France	0	0	3	3
4	Tunisia	0	0	1	1
-	Greece	0	0	1	1
-	Algeria	0	0	1	1
Total		4	4	8	20
