= Rita König =

German fencer (born 1977)

Personal information
- Born: 12 March 1977 (age 49) Satu Mare, Romania

Sport
- Sport: Fencing
- Club: FC Tauberbischofsheim
Medal record
Women's fencing
Representing Germany
Olympic Games
Silver medal – second place	2000 Sydney	Foil, individual
Bronze medal – third place	2000 Sydney	Foil, team

Rita König (born 12 March 1977) is a German fencer. She won a silver medal in the women's individual foil and a bronze in the team foil events at the 2000 Summer Olympics.

König attended the Kaufmännische Schule Tauberbischofsheim and fought for the Fencing-Club Tauberbischofsheim.
