= 1999 European Fencing Championships =

The 1999 European Fencing Championships were held in Bolzano, Italy. The event took place from 22 to 27 June 1999 at the PalaOnda. 250 fencers participated in eleven events, amongst which women's individual sabre was for the first time featured.

== Medal summary ==
=== Men's events ===
Event	Gold	Silver	Bronze
Foil	Salvatore Sanzo (ITA)	Sławomir Mocek (POL)	Javier Menéndez (ESP); Márk Marsi (HUN)
Épée	Remy Delhomme (FRA)	Alfredo Rota (ITA)	Pavel Kolobkov (RUS); Bartłomiej Kurowski (POL)
Sabre	Wiradech Kothny (GER)	Luigi Tarantino (ITA)	Victor Găureanu (ROU); Julien Pillet (FRA)
Team Foil	Italy	France	Poland
Team Épée	Italy	France	Germany
Team Sabre	France	Romania	Italy

=== Women's events ===
Event	Gold	Silver	Bronze
Foil	Valentina Vezzali (ITA)	Monika Weber (GER)	Laura Badea (ROU); Annamaria Giacometti (ITA)
Épée	Imke Duplitzer (GER)	Elisa Uga (ITA)	Claudia Bokel (GER); Deniss Holzkamp (GER)
Sabre	Yelena Jemayeva (AZE)	Cécile Argiolas (FRA)	Edina Csaba (HUN); Natalya Makeyeva (RUS)
Team Foil	Italy	Romania	Hungary
Team Épée	Italy	Russia	Hungary

=== Medal table ===
Rank	Nation	Gold	Silver	Bronze	Total
1	Italy	6	3	2	11
2	France	2	3	1	6
3	Germany	2	1	3	6
4	Azerbaijan	1	0	0	1
5	Romania	0	2	2	4
6	Poland	0	1	2	3
6	Russia	0	1	2	3
8	Hungary	0	0	4	4
9	Spain	0	0	1	1
Totals (9 entries)		11	11	17	39
