= 1993 European Fencing Championships =

Fencing competition in Vienna, Austria

The 1993 European Fencing Championships were held in Vienna, Austria. The competition consisted of individual events only.

== Medal summary ==
=== Men's events ===
Event	Gold	Silver	Bronze
Foil	Joachim Wendt (AUT)	Uwe Römer (GER)	Thorsten Weidner (GER); Ingo Weißenborn (GER)
Épée	Patric Draenert (GER)	Mariusz Strzalka (GER)	Jean-François Di Martino (FRA); Gábor Totola (HUN)
Sabre	Felix Becker (GER)	Csaba Köves (HUN)	Florin Lupeică (ROU); Steffen Wiesinger (GER)

=== Women's events ===
Event	Gold	Silver	Bronze
Foil	Anja Fichtel (GER)	Zsuzsa Jánosi (HUN)	Laura Badea (ROU); Valentina Vezzali (ITA)
Épée	Roberta Giussani (ITA)	Gianna Bürki (SUI)	Elisa Uga (ITA); Eva-Maria Ittner (GER)

=== Medal table ===
Rank	Nation	Gold	Silver	Bronze	Total
1	Germany	3	2	4	9
2	Italy	1	0	2	3
3	Austria	1	0	0	1
4	Hungary	0	2	1	3
5	Switzerland	0	1	0	1
6	Romania	0	0	2	2
7	France	0	0	1	1
Totals (7 entries)		5	5	10	20
