= 1994 European Fencing Championships =

The 1994 European Fencing Championships were held in Kraków, Poland. The competition consisted of individual events only.

== Medal summary ==
=== Men's events ===
Event	Gold	Silver	Bronze
Foil	Dmitriy Shevchenko (RUS)	Uwe Römer (GER)	Patrice Lhotellier (FRA); Joachim Wendt (AUT)
Épée	Vitaliy Aheyev (UKR)	Arnd Schmitt (GER)	Michael Flegler (GER); Paolo Milanoli (ITA)
Sabre	Stanislav Pozdnyakov (RUS)	Raffaello Caserta (ITA)	Vilmoș Szabo (ROU); Luigi Tarantino (ITA)

=== Women's events ===
Event	Gold	Silver	Bronze
Foil	Sabine Bau (GER)	Laura Badea (ROU)	Anja Fichtel (GER); Giovanna Trillini (ITA)
Épée	Sangita Tripathi (FRA)	Karin Mayer (GER)	Katja Nass (GER); Gianna Bürki (SUI)

=== Medal table ===
Rank	Nation	Gold	Silver	Bronze	Total
1	Russia	2	0	0	2
2	Germany	1	3	3	7
3	France	1	0	1	2
4	Ukraine	1	0	0	1
5	Italy	0	1	3	4
6	Romania	0	1	1	2
7	Austria	0	0	1	1
7	Switzerland	0	0	1	1
Totals (8 entries)		5	5	10	20
