= Lubiana =

Lubiana may refer to:

- Ljubljana (Italian: Lubiana)
- Lubiana, West Pomeranian Voivodeship
- Łubiana
