= Valeria Álvarez =

Argentine swimmer

Personal information
- Born: January 7, 1978 (age 48)

Sport
- Sport: Swimming
- Strokes: Backstroke

Valeria Álvarez (born 7 January 1978) is an Argentinean former swimmer.

== Career ==
At the 1996 Summer Olympic Games she competed in five events. She finished 39th in the women's 50 metre freestyle, 43rd in the women's 100 metre freestyle, 30th in the women's 100 metre backstroke, 23rd in the women's 4 × 100 m medley relay and 21st in the women's 4 × 200 m freestyle relay.
