= Cristina Gallo =

Argentine sports shooter

Personal information
- Nationality: Argentine
- Born: 4 January 1976 (age 49)

Sport
- Sport: Sports shooting

Cristina Gallo (born 4 January 1976) is an Argentine sports shooter. She competed in two events at the 1996 Summer Olympics.
