= Israel at the 1996 Summer Olympics =

- IOC code: ISR
- NOC: Olympic Committee of Israel
- Website: www.olympicsil.co.il (in Hebrew and English)

in Atlanta
- Competitors: 25 (18 men and 7 women) in 10 sports
- Flag bearer: Lydia Hatuel-Zuckerman
- Medals Ranked 71st: Gold 0 Silver 0 Bronze 1 Total 1

Summer Olympics appearances (overview)
- 1952; 1956; 1960; 1964; 1968; 1972; 1976; 1980; 1984; 1988; 1992; 1996; 2000; 2004; 2008; 2012; 2016; 2020; 2024

Israel competed at the 1996 Summer Olympics in Atlanta, United States. 25 competitors, 18 men and 7 women, took part in 26 events in 10 sports. Gal Fridman won a bronze medal in Sailing, the only medal won by an Israeli at these games.

== Medalists ==
=== Bronze ===
- Gal Fridman — Sailing, Men's Mistral Individual Competition

== Results by event ==
=== Athletics ===
Gender	Event	Participant	Round	Result	Place	Ref
Men's	Triple Jump	Rogel Nachum	Qualification	16.67m	17th place	
Men's	High Jump	Konstantin Matusevich	Qualification	2.26m	17th place	
Men's	Pole Vault	Danny Krasnov	Qualification	5.60m	12th place	
Men's	Pole Vault	Danny Krasnov	Final	5.60m	11th place	
Men's	Pole Vault	Konstantin Semyonov	Qualification	5.40m	20th place	

=== Boxing ===
Event	Participant	Round	Result	Ref
Flyweight (– 51 kg)	Vladislav Neiman	First round	Lost to Bolat Dzhumadilov Kazakhstan 7:18	

=== Canoeing ===
Gender	Event	Participant	Round	Time	Place	Ref
Women's	K-1 500m	Lior Carmi	Heat	1:57.675	6th place	
Women's	K-1 500m	Lior Carmi	Repechage	2:05.737	4th place	
Women's	K-1 500m	Lior Carmi	Semi-final	1:54.899	7th place	

=== Fencing ===
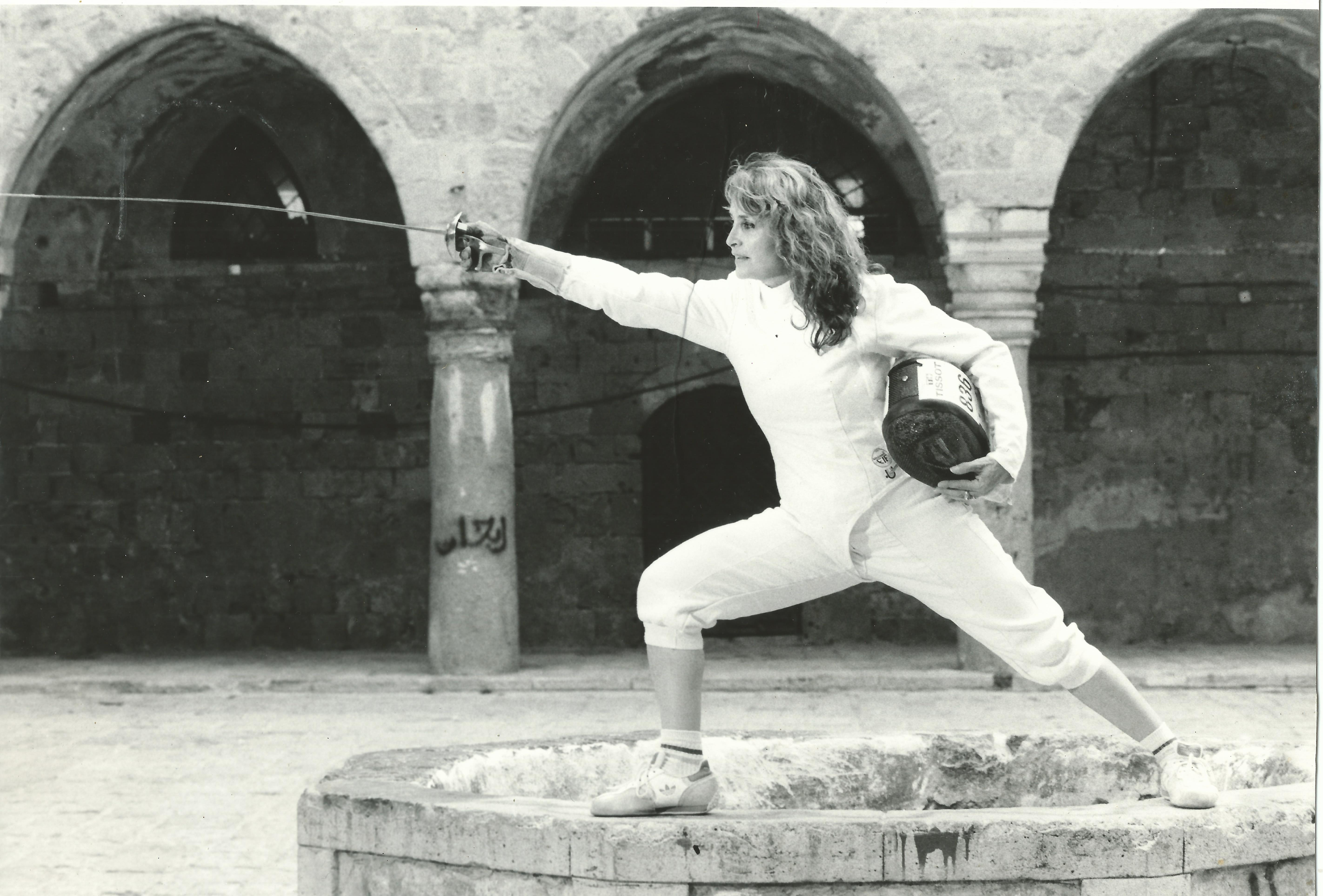
Lydia Hatuel-Zuckerman

Gender	Event	Participant	Result	Ref
Women's	Foil	Lydia Hatuel-Zuckerman		
Women's	Foil	Ayelet Ohayon		
Women's	Foil	Lilach Parisky		
Women's	Team foil	Lydia Hatuel-Zuckerman; Ayelet Ohayon; Lilach Parisky	9th place	

=== Judo ===
Event	Participant	Result	Ref
Men's Under-78 kg	Oren Smadja		
Women's Under-61 kg	Yael Arad	5th place	

=== Sailing ===
Gender	Event	Participant	Result	Ref
Men's	Mistral	Gal Fridman	Bronze	
Men's	470	Nir Shantal & Ran Shantal	19th place	
Women's	470	Shani Kedmi & Anat Fabrikant	12th place	

=== Shooting ===
Gender	Event	Participant	Result	Ref
Men's	10 m Air Rifle	Boris Polak	33rd place	
Men's	10 m Air Pistol	Alex Tripolski	39th place	
Men's	50 m Free Rifle 3 Position	Boris Polak	22nd place	
Men's	50 m Free Rifle 3 Position	Guy Starik	13th place	
Men's	50 m Free Rifle Prone	Boris Polak	20th place	
Men's	50 m Free Rifle Prone	Guy Starik	26th place	
Men's	50 m Free Pistol	Alex Tripolski	16th place	
Men's	10 m Air Pistol	Alex Tripolski	39th place	

=== Swimming ===
Gender	Event	Participant	Round	Time	Result	Place	Ref
Men's	50m Freestyle	Yoav Bruck	Heat	23.22	Did not advance	24th place	
Men's	100m Freestyle	Yoav Bruck	Heat	50.61	Did not advance	22nd place	
Men's	100m Backstroke	Eithan Urbach	Heat	56.74	Did not advance	22nd place	
Men's	100m Breaststroke	Vadim Alexeev	Heat	1:02.92	Did not advance	18th place	
Men's	200m Breaststroke	Vadim Alexeev	Heat	2:20.47	Did not advance	26th place	
Men's	100m Butterfly	Dan Kutler	Heat	55.11	Did not advance	31st place	
Men's	4 × 100 m Medley Relay	Eithan Urbach; Vadim Alexeev; Dan Kutler; Yoav Bruck	Heat	3:42.24		8th place	
Men's	4 × 100 m Medley Relay	Eithan Urbach; Vadim Alexeev; Dan Kutler; Yoav Bruck	Final	3:42.90		8th place	

=== Weightlifting ===
Event	Participant	Result	Ref
Men's Under 99 kg	Viacheslav Ivanovski	Did not finish	

=== Wrestling ===
Style	Event	Participant	Round	Result	Place	Ref
Greco-Roman	Under-82 kg	Gotsha Tsitsiashvili	1st round	Beat Tuomo Karila (FIN) 2:0	5th Place	
Greco-Roman	Under-82 kg	Gotsha Tsitsiashvili	2nd round	Beat Park Myung-Suk (KOR) 4:1	5th Place	
Greco-Roman	Under-82 kg	Gotsha Tsitsiashvili	Quarterfinals	Bye	5th Place	
Greco-Roman	Under-82 kg	Gotsha Tsitsiashvili	Semifinals	Lost to Thomas Zander (GER) 1:3	5th Place	
Greco-Roman	Under-82 kg	Gotsha Tsitsiashvili	Repechage, 6th round	Lost to Daulet Turlykhanov (KAZ) 0:4	5th Place	
Greco-Roman	Under-82 kg	Gotsha Tsitsiashvili	5th-6th place	Beat Martin Lidberg (SWE) by walk-over	5th Place	
