= Guillermo Martínez (volleyball) =

Argentine volleyball player (born 1969)

Personal information
- Full name: Guillermo Jorge Martínez
- Nationality: Argentine
- Born: 18 January 1969 (age 56)

Sport
- Sport: Volleyball

Guillermo Martínez (born 18 January 1969) is an Argentine volleyball player. He competed in the men's tournament at the 1996 Summer Olympics.
