= María Bertelloti =

Argentine swimmer

Personal information
- Born: 31 May 1980 (age 46)

Sport
- Sport: Swimming

María Bertelloti (born 31 May 1980) is an Argentine swimmer. She competed in the women's 4 × 200 metre freestyle relay and women's 4 × 100 metre medley relay events at the 1996 Summer Olympics.
