= Vita Silchenko =

Belarusian fencer (born 1967)

Personal information
- Born: 19 February 1967 (age 59) Minsk, Belarus

Sport
- Sport: Fencing

Vita Silchenko (born 19 February 1967) is a Belarusian fencer. She competed in the women's individual foil event at the 2004 Summer Olympics.
