= Anna Angelova =

Bulgarian fencer (born 1971)

Personal information
- Born: 9 January 1971 (age 55) Plovdiv, Bulgaria

Sport
- Sport: Fencing

Anna Angelova (born 9 January 1971) is a Bulgarian fencer. She competed in the women's individual foil event at the 1996 Summer Olympics.
