= Fencing at the Mediterranean Games =

Fencing is one of the sports at the quadrennial Mediterranean Games competition. It has been one of the sports competed at the event since the inaugural edition in 1951.

== Summary ==
Games	Year	Host city	Host country	Fencing events			Best nation
Games	Year	Host city	Host country	Men	Women	Total	Best nation
I	1951	Alexandria	Egypt	6	—	6	Italy (ITA)
II	1955	Barcelona	Spain	6	—	6	France (FRA)
III	1959	Beirut	Lebanon	6	—	6	France (FRA)
IV	1963	Naples	Italy	3	—	3	France (FRA)
V	1967	Tunis	Tunisia	3	—	3	France (FRA)
VI	1971	İzmir	Turkey	3	1	4	Italy (ITA)
VII	1975	Algiers	Algeria	3	1	4	Italy (ITA)
VIII	1979	Split	Yugoslavia	3	1	4	France (FRA)
IX	1983	Casablanca	Morocco	3	1	4	Italy (ITA)
X	1987	Latakia	Syria	Not included in program			
XI	1991	Athens	Greece	3	1	4	
XII	1993	Languedoc-Roussillon	France	3	1	4	
XIII	1997	Bari	Italy	3	1	4	
XIV	2001	Tunis	Tunisia	2	2	4	Italy (ITA)
XV	2005	Almería	Spain	3	2	5	France (FRA)
XVI	2009	Pescara	Italy	1	3	4	Italy (ITA)
XVII	2013	Mersin	Turkey	3	3	6	Italy (ITA)
XVIII	2018	Tarragona	Spain	1	3	4	Tunisia (TUN)
XIX	2022	Oran	Algeria	3	3	6	Italy (ITA)
XX	2026	Taranto	Italy	3	3	6	Egypt (EGY)

== Events ==
=== Men's ===
Event	51	55	59	63	67	71	75	79	83	87	91	93	97	01	05	09	13	18	22	26	Years
Épée, individual	X	X	X	X	X	X	X	X	X		X	X	X	X	X	X	X	X	X	X	19
Épée, team	X	X	X																		3
Foil, individual	X	X	X	X	X	X	X	X	X		X	X	X	X	X		X		X	X	16
Foil, team	X	X	X																		3
Sabre, individual	X	X	X	X	X	X	X	X	X		X	X	X		X		X		X	X	16
Sabre, team	X	X	X																		3
Total	6	6	6	3	3	3	3	3	3	0	3	3	3	2	3	1	3	1	3	3	

=== Women's ===
Event	51	55	59	63	67	71	75	79	83	87	91	93	97	01	05	09	13	18	22	26	Years
Épée, individual														X	X	X	X	X	X	X	7
Foil, individual						X	X	X	X		X	X	X	X	X	X	X	X	X	X	14
Sabre, individual																X	X	X	X	X	5
Total	0	0	0	0	0	1	1	1	1	0	1	1	1	2	2	3	3	3	3	3	

== All-time medal table ==
Updated after the 2026 Mediterranean Games. Italics represent teams that no longer exist.

Rank	Nation	Gold	Silver	Bronze	Total
1	Italy (ITA)	40	40	37	117
2	France (FRA)	33	25	33	91
3	Egypt (EGY)	4	5	8	17
4	Spain (ESP)	2	8	19	29
5	Tunisia (TUN)	2	3	6	11
6	Turkey (TUR)	2	3	4	9
7	Algeria (ALG)	1	1	1	3
7	United Arab Republic	1	1	1	3
9	Greece (GRE)	1	0	3	4
10	Serbia (SRB)	1	0	1	2
11	Lebanon (LBN)	0	1	2	3
12	Portugal (POR)	0	0	2	2
13	Morocco (MAR)	0	0	1	1
13	Yugoslavia	0	0	1	1
Totals (14 entries)		87	87	119	293

== Mediterranean Fencing Championship ==
Mediterranean Fencing Championship organised by Confédération Méditerranéenne d'Escrime (COMES).

Edizione	Anno	Città	Nazione
I	2004	Istanbul	Turkey
II	2005	Il Cairo	Egypt
III	2006	Hammamet	Tunisia
IV	2007	Siracusa	Italy
V	2008	Tunisi	Tunisia
VI	2009	Loures	France
VII	2010	Zrenjanin	Serbia
VIII	2011	Beirut	Lebanon
IX	2012	Parenzo	Croatia
X	2013	Algeri	Algeria
XI	2014	Chiavari	Italy
XII	2015	Guadalajara	Spain
XIII	2016	Orano	Algeria
XIV	2017	Marsiglia	France
XV	2018	Il Cairo	Egypt
XVI	2019	Cagliari	Italy
XVII	2020	Tunisi	Tunisia
XVIII	2022	al-Salt	Jordan
XIX	2023	Zagabria	Croatia
XX	2024	La Nucia	Spain
XXI	2025	Orsera	Croatia
XXII	2026	Lubiana	Slovenia

== See also ==
- Fencing at the Summer Olympics
