= Magdalena Mroczkiewicz =

Polish fencer (born 1979)

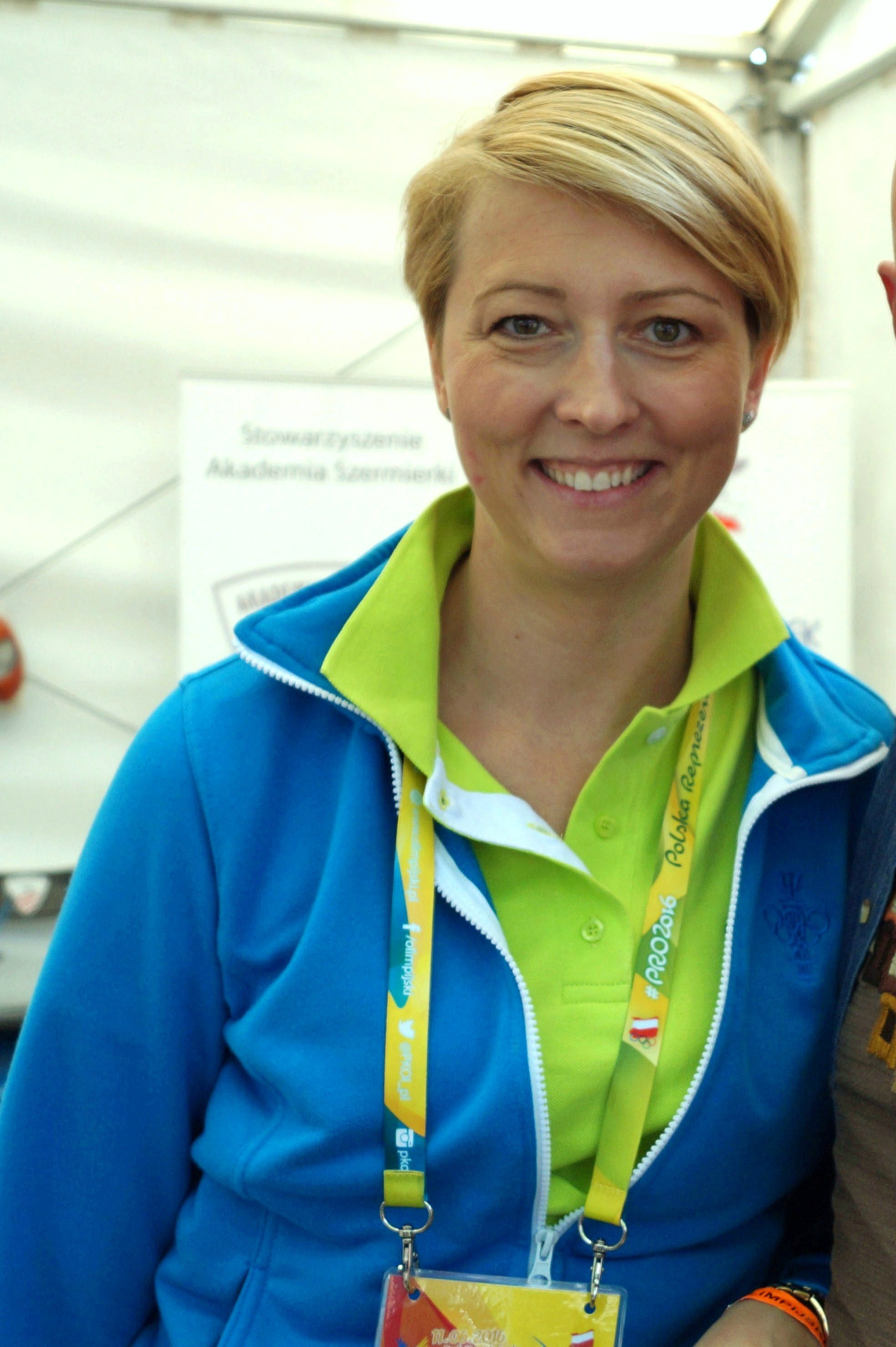
- Magdalena Mroczkiewicz in 2016

Personal information
- Born: 28 August 1979 (age 46) Gdańsk, Poland

Sport
- Sport: Fencing
Medal record
Women's fencing
Representing Poland
Olympic Games
Silver medal – second place	2000 Sydney	Foil, team

Magdalena Mroczkiewicz (born 28 August 1979) is a Polish fencer. She won a silver medal in the women's team foil event at the 2000 Summer Olympics.
