= Herklots =

Herklots is a surname. Notable people with the surname include:

- Geoffrey Herklots (1902–1986), British botanist and ornithologist
- Jan Adrianus Herklots (1820–1872), Dutch zoologist
- Karl Alexander Herklots (1759–1830), German lawyer, chiefly remembered since his death as a theatre librettist and translator
