= Paula Reinoso =

Argentine sailor

Personal information
- Born: 19 March 1973 (age 52) Buenos Aires, Argentina

Sport
- Sport: Sailing

Paula Reinoso (born 19 March 1973) is an Argentine sailor. She competed at the 1996 Summer Olympics, the 2000 Summer Olympics, and the 2004 Summer Olympics.
