= Chan Ying Man =

Hong Kong fencer

Personal information
- Born: 8 June 1983 (age 43)

Sport
- Sport: Fencing

Chan Ying Man (Chinese: 陳盈敏; born 8 June 1983) is a Hong Kong fencer. She competed in the women's individual foil event at the 2004 Summer Olympics.
