= Clothilde Magnan =

French fencer

Personal information
- Born: 5 March 1973 (age 53) Boulogne-sur-Mer, Pas-de-Calais, France

Sport
- Sport: Fencing
Medal record
Mediterranean Games
Bronze medal – third place	1993 Languedoc-Roussillon	Individual foil

Clothilde Magnan (born 5 March 1973) is a French fencer. She competed in the women's individual and team foil events at the 1996 Summer Olympics. She won a bronze medal in the individual foil event at the 1993 Mediterranean Games.
