= Leandro Baccaro =

Argentine field hockey player

Leandro Martín Baccaro Coll (born April 17, 1973) is a former field hockey player from Argentina. He competed for his native country at the 1996 Summer Olympics, where he finished in ninth place with the national squad.
