= Esteban Pérez =

Argentine basketball player

Esteban Daniel Pérez Spatazza (born March 26, 1966, in Rosario, Santa Fe) is a retired male basketball player (2.00 metres) from Argentina, who competed for his native country at the 1996 Summer Olympics in Atlanta, Georgia, finishing in ninth place in the overall-rankings. He was nicknamed "Gallo" during his career.
