= Ivana Georgieva =

Bulgarian fencer

Personal information
- Born: 30 October 1971 (age 54) Sofia, Bulgaria

Sport
- Sport: Fencing

Ivana Georgieva (Bulgarian: Ивана Георгиева, born 30 October 1971) is a Bulgarian fencer. She competed in the women's individual foil event at the 1996 Summer Olympics.
