= Laura Badea-Cârlescu =

Romanian fencer (born 1970)

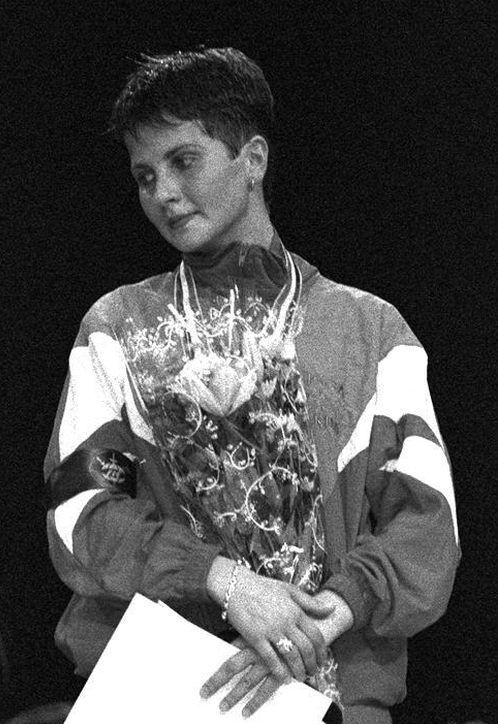
- Badea-Cârlescu at the 1995 World Championships

Personal information
- Born: Laura Badea; 28 March 1970 (age 56) Bucharest, Romania
- Height: 1.68 m (5 ft 6 in)
- Weight: 56 kg (123 lb; 8.8 st)

Fencing career
- Sport: Fencing
- Weapon: foil
- Hand: left-handed
- Club: CSA Steaua București
Medal record
Women's fencing
Representing Romania
Event	1st	2nd	3rd
Olympic Games	1	1	1
World Championships	2	5	2
European Championships	4	4	2
Universiade	0	0	1
Total	7	10	6
Olympic Games
Gold medal – first place	1996 Atlanta	Foil Individual
Silver medal – second place	1996 Atlanta	Foil Team
Bronze medal – third place	1992 Barcelona	Foil Team
World Championships
Gold medal – first place	1994 Athens	Team foil
Gold medal – first place	1995 The Hague	Foil
Silver medal – second place	1993 Essen	Team foil
Silver medal – second place	1995 The Hague	Team foil
Silver medal – second place	1997 Cape Town	Team foil
Silver medal – second place	1998 La Chaux-de-Fonds	Team foil
Silver medal – second place	2004 New York	Team foil
Bronze medal – third place	2002 Lisbon	Team foil
Bronze medal – third place	2003 Havana	Team foil
European Championships
Gold medal – first place	1996 Limoges	Foil
Gold medal – first place	1997 Gdansk	Foil
Gold medal – first place	2004 Copenhagen	Foil
Gold medal – first place	2004 Copenhagen	Team foil
Silver medal – second place	1994 Krakow	Foil
Silver medal – second place	1999 Bolzano	Team foil
Silver medal – second place	2000 Madeira	Team foil
Silver medal – second place	2002 Moscow	Foil
Bronze medal – third place	1993 Linz	Foil
Bronze medal – third place	1999 Bolzano	Foil
Summer Universiade
Bronze medal – third place	1997 Sicily	Foil Team

Laura Gabriela Badea-Cârlescu (née Badea on 28 March 1970) is a retired Romanian foil fencer, world champion in 1995, olympic champion in 1996 and European champion in 1996,1997, 2004. After her retirement (23-year career at top-level fencing, winning 23 medals at the Olympics, World Championships, European Championships and Universiade) she became a fencing coach, then a sport administrator with numerous roles. She served as President of the Athletes Commission (2001–2005) for the Romanian Olympic and Sports Committee, Member of the Rules Commission of the International Fencing Federation, Director of Olympic Education of the Romanian Olympic and Sports Committee (2005–2012), Director of Romanian Olympic Academy(2011–2017), Romanian Ambassador for Sports, Tolerance and Fair-Play at the Council of Europe (2004–2011), Member of the Science and Sports Council in Romania (2006–2009), Member of the Romanian Anti-Doping Agency, vice-president of the Romanian Fencing Federation (2005–2011), President of the Romanian Fencing Federation (2017–2018), Member of the Culture and Olympic Heritage Commission at the European Olympic Committee, Member of the executive committee at the Romanian Olympic and Sports Committee.

== Personal life ==
Badea was born in Bucharest in 1970, the youngest of four children. She first played handball and track and field before turning to fencing at age 13 under Rodica Popescu, a coach at CSS 1 Bucharest, then Maria Vicol. A fan of Alexandre Dumas' The Three Musketeers, she immediately took to the sport. She later joined CSA Steaua București.

She graduated from the National Academy of Physical Education and Sport in 1995. She obtained in 2003 a master in communication and human resources management from the University of Bucharest and in 2007 a master in sport management and marketing from the Alexandru Ioan Cuza University in Iași. She also holds a PhD in sport science on the subject of "Contributions to clarifying the relationship between motor intelligence and capacity for effort in high-level fencing" (“Contribuții la clarificarea raportului dintre inteligența motrică și capacitatea de efort în scrima de performanță”).

During her career Carlescu-Badea was a superior officer in the Romanian Army (1988–2004), rising to the rank of colonel. Badea married sabre fencer Adrian Cârlescu in 1999. The couple have a daughter, Maria.

== Career ==
Badea took part in her first Olympic Games in Barcelona in 1992, where she took the team bronze medal along with Reka Szabo, Elisabeta Tufan, Claudia Grigorescu, and Ozana Dumitrescu. Romania went to earn the silver medal in the 1993 World Championships in Essen, then the gold medal in the 1994 World Championships in Athens. A year later, Badea won her first major individual title with a gold medal in the World Championships in The Hague; she also won a silver medal in the team event. At the 1996 Summer Olympics in Atlanta Badea won the gold medal after defeating Valentina Vezzali of Italy and became the first and only Romanian woman fencer Olympic champion. In the team event, Romania was defeated by Italy in the final and took the silver medal.

She won gold medal in the European Championships in 1996, 1997 and 2004 individual and also, in 2004 in the team event.

Badea retired from competition in 2004. In 2013, she was inducted into the Hall of Fame of the International Fencing Federation.
