= Carmen Rodríguez (fencer) =

Guatemalan fencer (born 1972)

Personal information
- Born: 15 July 1972 (age 53)

Sport
- Sport: Fencing

Carmen Rodríguez (born 15 July 1972) is a Guatemalan fencer. She competed in the women's individual foil event at the 1996 Summer Olympics.
