= Julie Mahoney =

Canadian fencer (born 1978)

Personal information
- Born: 31 May 1978 (age 48) Montreal, Quebec, Canada

Sport
- Sport: Fencing
Medal record
Representing Canada
Pan American Games
Bronze medal – third place	1999 Winnipeg	Individual foil

Julie Mahoney (born 31 May 1978) is a Canadian fencer. She competed in the women's individual and team foil events at the 2000 Summer Olympics.
