= Maju Herklotz =

Brazilian fencer (born 1975)

Personal information
- Born: 4 November 1975 (age 50) Rio de Janeiro, Rio de Janeiro, Brazil

Sport
- Sport: Fencing

Maju Herklotz (born 4 November 1975) is a Brazilian fencer. She competed in the women's individual foil event at the 2004 Summer Olympics.
