= Maria Rentoumi =

Greek fencer

Personal information
- Born: 9 December 1981 (age 44)

Sport
- Sport: Fencing

Maria Rentoumi (born 9 December 1981) is a Greek fencer. She competed in the women's individual foil event at the 2004 Summer Olympics.
