= Olena Koltsova =

Ukrainian fencer

Personal information
- Born: 11 June 1972 (age 54)

Sport
- Sport: Fencing

Olena Ihorivna Koltsova (Ukrainian: Олена Ігорівна Кольцова; born 11 June 1972) is a Ukrainian former fencer. She competed in the individual and team foil events at the 2000 Summer Olympics.
