= Liudmyla Vasylieva =

Ukrainian fencer

Personal information
- Born: 22 June 1969 (age 57)

Sport
- Sport: Fencing

Liudmyla Vasylieva (born 22 June 1969) is a Ukrainian former fencer. She competed in the individual and team foil events at the 2000 Summer Olympics.
