= Roxana Scarlat =

Romanian fencer (born 1975)

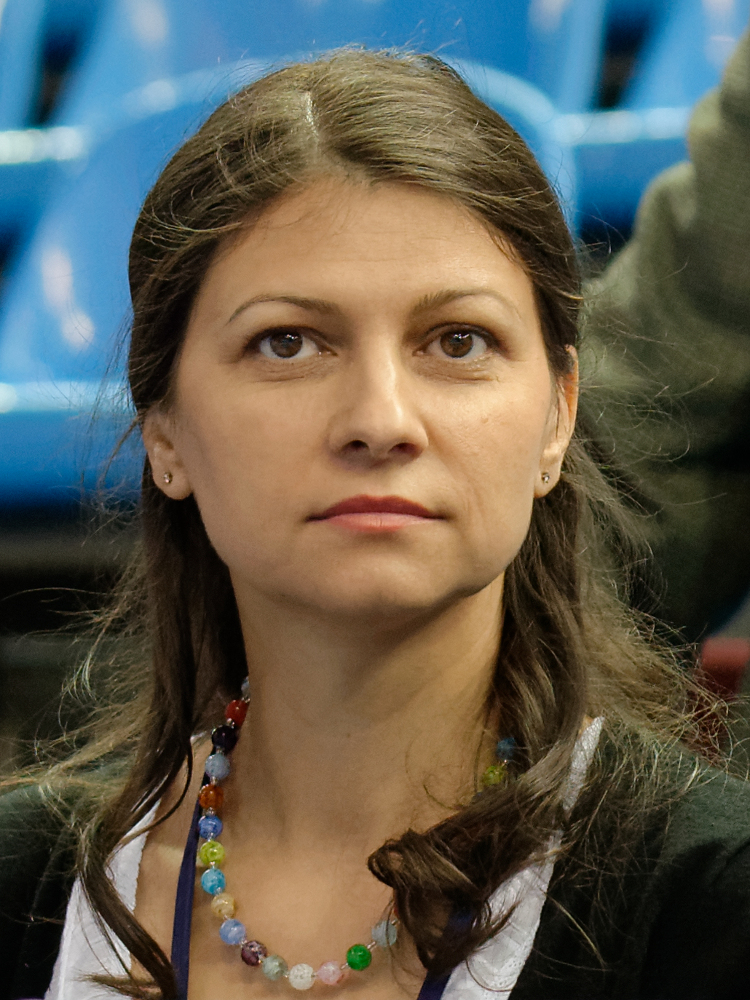
- Scarlat in 2015

Personal information
- Full name: Roxana Mariana Scarlat-Bârlădeanu
- Born: 3 January 1975 (age 51) Bucharest, Romania

Fencing career
- Sport: Fencing
- Weapon: Foil
- Hand: Right-handed
- Club: CSA Steaua București
- Head coach: Petre Ducu
- Retired: 2008
- FIE ranking: archive
Medal record
Women's Foil
Representing Romania
Olympic Games
| Silver medal – second place | 1996 Atlanta | Foil, team |
World Championships
| Silver medal – second place | 1997 Cape Town | Team foil |
| Silver medal – second place | 1998 La Chaux-de-Fonds | Team foil |
| Silver medal – second place | 2004 New York | Team foil |
| Silver medal – second place | 2005 Leipzig | Team foil |
| Bronze medal – third place | 2001 Nîmes | Foil |
| Bronze medal – third place | 2002 Lisbon | Team Foil |
| Bronze medal – third place | 2003 Havana | Foil |
| Bronze medal – third place | 2003 Havana | Team Foil |
European Championships
| Silver medal – second place | 1997 Gdańsk | Foil |
| Silver medal – second place | 2006 Izmir | Team foil |
| Bronze medal – third place | 2001 Coblenz | Team foil |
| Bronze medal – third place | 2002 Moscow | Foil |

Roxana Scarlat-Bârlădeanu (born 3 January 1975) is a Romanian fencer. She won a silver medal in the women's team foil event at the 1996 Summer Olympics.

Scarlat retired from competition after missing the qualification for the 2008 Summer Olympics. She is now an official of the Romanian Fencing Federation.

She married Marius Bârlădeanu. The couple have two sons, Tudor-Ioan and Vlad-Iustin.
