= Yuan Li (fencer) =

Chinese fencer

Personal information
- Born: 19 September 1978 (age 47)

Sport
- Sport: Fencing

Yuan Li (Chinese: 袁力; pinyin: Yuán Lì; born 19 September 1978) is a Chinese fencer. She competed in the women's individual and team foil events at the 2000 Summer Olympics.
