= Katarzyna Felusiak =

Polish fencer

Personal information
- Born: 12 December 1973 (age 52) Gdańsk, Poland

Sport
- Sport: Fencing

Katarzyna Felusiak (born 12 December 1973) is a Polish fencer. She competed in the women's foil events at the 1992 and 1996 Summer Olympics.
