= Olha Leleiko =

Ukrainian fencer (born 1977)

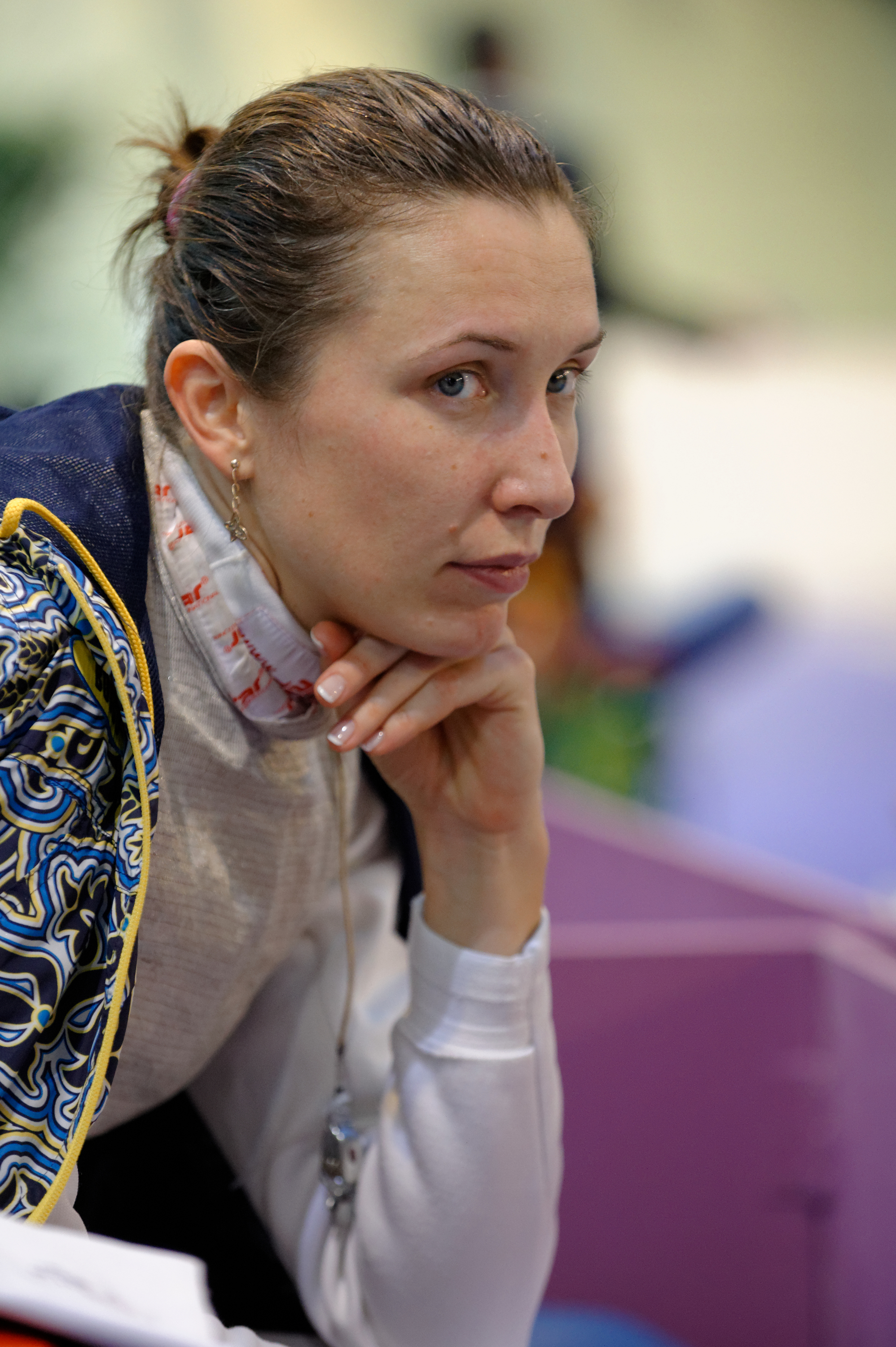

Personal information
- Full name: Olha Oleksandrivna Leleiko
- Born: 21 July 1977 (age 48) Kyiv, Ukrainian SSR, Soviet Union
- Height: 1.76 m (5 ft 9 in)
- Weight: 65 kg (143 lb)

Fencing career
- Sport: Fencing
- Weapon: foil
- Hand: right-handed
- FIE ranking: current ranking
Medal record
Women's foil
Representing Ukraine
European Championships
Bronze medal – third place	2007 Ghent	Individual

Olha Oleksandrivna Leleiko (Ukrainian: Ольга Олександрівна Лелейко; born 21 July 1977) is a Ukrainian fencer. She competed in the women's foil events at the 2000, 2008, 2012, and 2016 Summer Olympics.
