= Wassila Rédouane-Saïd-Guerni =

Algerian fencer

Personal information
- Born: 28 September 1980 (age 45)

Sport
- Sport: Fencing
- Club: AEC

Wassila Rédouane-Saïd-Guerni (born 28 April 1980) is an Algerian foil fencer.

She participated in the 2000 and 2004 Olympic Games, but lost her first match on both occasions.

In March 2001 she married retired middle-distance runner Djabir Saïd-Guerni. The couple met at the 2000 Olympic Games and live in Aubervilliers, France. They have divorced since, and Wassila Redouane is currently training and competing for France.

- 2 Olympic Fencer
- 9 African Champion
- 6 French Champion
- Fonder and Coach at A.E.C Aubervilliers Escrime Club
