= Suzanne Paxton =

American fencer

Personal information
- Born: December 27, 1969 (age 56) Baltimore, Maryland, United States

Sport
- Sport: Fencing

Suzanne Paxton (born December 27, 1969) is an American fencer. She competed in the women's individual and team foil events at the 1996 Summer Olympics.

== See also ==
- List of Pennsylvania State University Olympians
