= Dolores Pampin =

Argentine fencer (born 1973)

Personal information
- Born: 20 December 1973 (age 52) Buenos Aires, Argentina

Sport
- Sport: Fencing
Medal record
Representing Argentina
Pan American Games
Bronze medal – third place	1995 Mar del Plata	Team foil

Dolores Jimena Pampin (born 20 December 1973) is an Argentine former fencer. She won a bronze medal in the team foil event at the 1995 Pan American Games. She also competed in the women's individual and team foil events at the 1996 Summer Olympics.
