= Diana Bianchedi =

Italian fencer (born 1969)

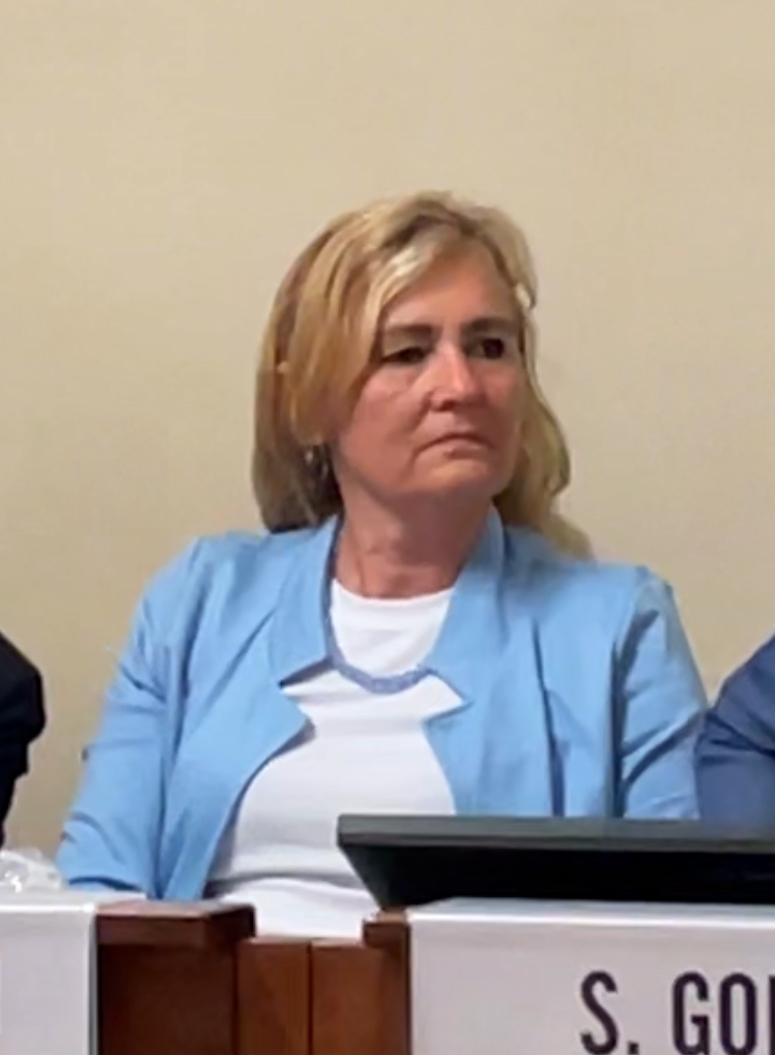

Personal information
- Born: 4 November 1969 (age 56) Milan, Italy

Sport
- Sport: Fencing
Medal record
Women's fencing
Representing Italy
Olympic Games
Gold medal – first place	1992 Barcelona	Team foil
Gold medal – first place	2000 Sydney	Team foil
World Championships
Gold medal – first place	1991 Budapest	Team foil
Gold medal – first place	1995 The Hague	Team foil
Gold medal – first place	1997 Cape Town	Team foil
Gold medal – first place	1998 La Chaux-de-Fonds	Team foil
Gold medal – first place	2001 Nîmes	Team foil
Silver medal – second place	1994 Athens	Team foil
Bronze medal – third place	1989 Denver	Team foil
Bronze medal – third place	1993 Essen	Team foil
Bronze medal – third place	1995 The Hague	Individual foil
Bronze medal – third place	1997 Cape Town	Individual foil
Summer Universiade
Gold medal – first place	1989 Duisburg	Individual foil
Gold medal – first place	1989 Duisburg	Team foil
Gold medal – first place	1991 Sheffield	Team foil
Gold medal – first place	1993 Buffalo	Team foil
Bronze medal – third place	1993 Buffalo	Individual foil

Diana Bianchedi (born 4 November 1969) is an Italian former fencer. She won a gold medal in the women's team foil event at the 1992 Summer Olympics and another gold in the same event at the 2000 Summer Olympics.
