= Iris Zimmermann =

American fencer (born 1981)

Personal information
- Born: January 6, 1981 (age 45) Rochester, New York, United States

Sport
- Sport: Fencing
- College team: Stanford University
- Club: Rochester Fencing Club
Medal record
Representing United States
World Fencing Championships
Bronze medal – third place	1999 Seoul	Team foil
Bronze medal – third place	2001 Nîmes	Team foil
Summer Universiade
Silver medal – second place	1999 Palma de Mallorca	Team foil
Pan American Games
Bronze medal – third place	1999 Winnipeg	Team foil

Iris Tien Zimmermann (born January 6, 1981) is an American fencer. She competed in the women's individual and team foil events at the 2000 Summer Olympics, and won a bronze medal at the 1999 World Fencing Championships. She has also been on the Stanford University fencing team.

Her sister is Felicia Zimmermann, an Olympic fencer for the United States in 1996 and 2000. In 2009, the sisters purchased the Rochester Fencing Club in Rochester, New York.

== See also ==
- List of NCAA fencing champions
- List of USFA Division I National Champions
- List of USFA Hall of Fame members
