= Liang Jun (fencer) =

Chinese fencer (born 1969)

Personal information
- Born: 12 March 1969 (age 57)

Sport
- Sport: Fencing

Liang Jun (Chinese: 梁 軍; born 12 March 1969) is a Chinese fencer. She competed at the 1992 and 1996 Summer Olympics.
