= Anna Rybicka =

Polish fencer (born 1977)

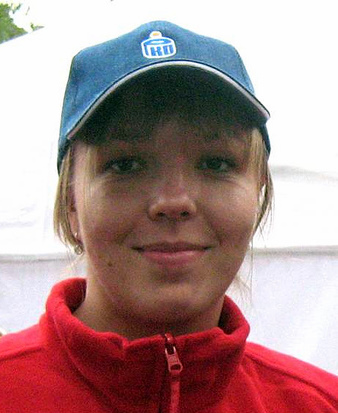
- Anna Rybicka (2007)

Personal information
- Born: 28 March 1977 (age 49) Gdynia, Poland

Sport
- Sport: Fencing
Medal record
Women's fencing
Representing Poland
Olympic Games
Silver medal – second place	2000 Sydney	Foil, team

Anna Rybicka (born 28 March 1977) is a Polish fencer. She won a silver medal in the women's team foil event at the 2000 Summer Olympics.
