= Adeline Wuillème =

French fencer

Personal information
- Born: 8 December 1975 (age 50) Reims, France

Sport
- Sport: Fencing
Medal record
Mediterranean Games
Bronze medal – third place	1997 Bari	Individual sabre
Bronze medal – third place	2001 Tunis	Individual sabre

Adeline Wuillème (born 8 December 1975 in Reims, Champagne-Ardenne), is a French foil fencer. She competed in three Olympic Games. She also competed in the individual sabre event at the Mediterranean Games, winning bronze medals in 1997 and 2001.
