= Yanina Iannuzzi =

Argentine fencer (born 1973)

Personal information
- Born: 22 July 1973 (age 52) Buenos Aires, Argentina

Sport
- Sport: Fencing
Medal record
Representing Argentina
Pan American Games
Bronze medal – third place	1991 Havana	Team foil
Bronze medal – third place	1995 Mar del Plata	Team foil

Yanina María Iannuzzi San Martín (born 22 July 1973) is an Argentine foil fencer. She competed at the 1992 and 1996 Summer Olympics.
