= Yekaterina Yusheva =

Russian fencer

Personal information
- Born: 30 April 1973 (age 53) Rostov-na-Donu, Russia

Sport
- Sport: Fencing

Yekaterina Yusheva (born 30 April 1973) is a Russian fencer. She competed in the women's foil events at the 2000 and 2004 Summer Olympics.
