= Ann Marsh =

American fencer

Personal information
- Born: June 30, 1971 (age 54) Royal Oak, Michigan, United States

Sport
- Sport: Fencing
- College team: Columbia University
Medal record
Representing United States
World Fencing Championships
Bronze medal – third place	2001 Nîmes	Team foil
Summer Universiade
Silver medal – second place	1999 Palma de Mallorca	Team foil
Pan American Games
Gold medal – first place	1991 Havana	Team foil
Gold medal – first place	1995 Mar del Plata	Individual foil
Silver medal – second place	1995 Mar del Plata	Team foil

Ann Elizabeth Marsh (born June 30, 1971) is an American fencer. She competed at the 1992, 1996 and 2000 Summer Olympics. She won a bronze medal in the team foil event at the 2001 World Fencing Championships.

She fenced for the Columbia Lions fencing team. She graduated from Columbia University in 1994 and works as a physician in private practice.

== See also ==
- List of USFA Hall of Fame members
