= Olga Sharkova-Sidorova =

Russian fencer

Personal information
- Born: 3 June 1968 (age 58) Samara, Russia

Sport
- Sport: Fencing

Olga Sharkova-Sidorova (born 5 May 1968) is a Russian fencer. She competed in the women's individual and team foil events at the 1996 and 2000 Summer Olympics. She also won a silver medal at the 1990 World Fencing Championships and the 1991 World Fencing Championships, and a bronze medal at the 1987 Summer Universiade.
