= Gabriella Lantos =

Hungarian fencer

Personal information
- Born: 24 September 1970 (age 55) Budapest, Hungary

Sport
- Sport: Fencing

Gabriella Lantos (born 24 September 1970) is a Hungarian fencer. She competed in the foil events at the 1992, 1996 and 2000 Summer Olympics.
