= Alejandra Carbone =

Argentine fencer (born 1975)

Personal information
- Born: 9 December 1975 (age 50) Buenos Aires, Argentina

Sport
- Sport: Fencing
- Club: GEBA
Medal record
Representing Argentina
Pan American Games
Bronze medal – third place	1995 Mar del Plata	Team foil

Alejandra Carbone (born 9 December 1975) is an Argentine foil fencer. She competed at the 1996, 2000 and 2004 Summer Olympics, was many times South American champion and also several times Pan American champion representing Argentina.

She has 3 children, their names are Mateo (2009), Francesca (2012) and Renzo (2019).
