= Felicia Zimmermann =

American fencer (born 1975)

Personal information
- Born: August 16, 1975 (age 50) Rochester, New York, U.S.
- Home town: Rush, New York, U.S.

Sport
- Sport: Fencing
Medal record
Representing United States
World Fencing Championships
| Bronze medal – third place | 2001 Nîmes | Team foil |
Summer Universiade
| Silver medal – second place | 1999 Palma de Mallorca | Team foil |
Pan American Games
| Silver medal – second place | 1995 Mar del Plata | Team foil |
| Bronze medal – third place | 1995 Mar del Plata | Individual foil |

Felicia Zimmermann (born August 16, 1975) is an American fencer. She competed in the women's individual and team foil events at the 1996 and 2000 Summer Olympics.

Zimmermann and her sister, Iris Zimmermann, began training as children at the Rochester Fencing Club. She attended School of the Arts in Rochester, New York and Stanford University where she became the first woman to win NCAA titles in both foil and epee. In 2001, she won a bronze medal in the team foil event at the World Fencing Championships.

== See also ==
- List of NCAA fencing champions
- List of USFA Division I National Champions
- List of USFA Hall of Fame members
