= Fencing at the 1992 Summer Olympics – Women's foil =

Fencing at the Olympics

Women's foil at the Games of the XXV Olympiad
- Venue: Palace of Metallurgy
- Dates: 30 July 1992
- Competitors: 46 from 19 nations

Medalists
1st place, gold medalist(s)		Giovanna Trillini	Italy
2nd place, silver medalist(s)		Wang Huifeng	China
3rd place, bronze medalist(s)		Tatyana Sadovskaya	Unified Team

The women's foil was one of eight fencing events on the fencing at the 1992 Summer Olympics programme. It was the fourteenth appearance of the event. The competition was held on 30 July 1992. 46 fencers from 19 nations competed.

== Competition format ==
The 1992 tournament used a three-phase format roughly similar to prior years in consisting of a group phase, a double-elimination phase, and a single-elimination phase, but each phase was very different from previous formats.

The first phase was a single round (vs. 3 rounds in 1988) round-robin pool play format; each fencer in a pool faced each other fencer in that pool once. There were 7 pools with 6 or 7 fencers each. The fencers' ranks within the pool were ignored; the overall winning percentage (with touch differential and then touches against used as tie-breakers) were used to rank the fencers. The top 36 advanced to the second phase, while the other fencers were eliminated.

The second phase was a modified, truncated double-elimination tournament. 28 fencers received a bye to the second round (round of 32), while the 8 fencers ranked 29–36 played in the round of 64. Fencers losing in the round of 64 were eliminated, while the remaining rounds were double elimination via repechages. The repechages (but not the main brackets) used a complicated reseeding mechanism. Ultimately, the 4 fencers remaining undefeated after the round of 8 advanced to the quarterfinals along with 4 fencers who advanced through the repechages after one loss.

The final phase was a single elimination tournament with quarterfinals, semifinals, and a final and bronze medal match.

All bouts were to 5 touches. In the second and third phases, matches were best-of-three bouts.

== Results ==
=== Group round ===
Fencers were ranked by win percent, then touch differential, then touches against. This ranking, with adjustments to ensure that no two fencers of the same nation were in the same bracket (noted in parentheses), was used to seed the elimination round brackets.

Rank	Fencer	Nation	Pool	Rank	Wins	Losses	Win %	TF	TA	TF - TA	Qual.
1	Gertrúd Stefanek	Hungary	5	1	6	0	1.000	30	13	17	Q
2	Sin Seong-Ja	South Korea	2	1	5	1	.833	26	12	14	Q
3	Francesca Bortolozzi-Borella	Italy	2	2	5	1	.833	25	15	10	Q
4	Zsuzsa Némethné Jánosi	Hungary	6	1	5	1	.833	29	21	8	Q
5	Olga Velichko	Unified Team	4	1	4	1	.800	23	7	16	Q
6	Yelena Glikina	Unified Team	3	1	4	1	.800	24	14	10	Q
7	Barbara Wolnicka-Szewczyk	Poland	3	2	4	1	.800	22	14	8	Q
8 (10)	Ildikó Nébaldné Mincza	Hungary	7	1	4	1	.800	23	15	8	Q
9 (8)	Zita-Eva Funkenhauser	Germany	4	2	4	1	.800	24	18	6	Q
10 (9)	Wang Huifeng	China	4	3	4	1	.800	22	17	5	Q
11	Elisabeta Guzganu-Tufan	Romania	6	2	4	2	.667	26	13	13	Q
12	Isabelle Spennato	France	2	3	4	2	.667	25	15	10	Q
13	Margherita Zalaffi	Italy	1	1	4	2	.667	26	17	9	Q
14	Anna Sobczak	Poland	6	3	4	2	.667	25	17	8	Q
15 (16)	Monika Maciejewska	Poland	1	2	4	2	.667	25	17	8	Q
16 (15)	Reka Zsofia Lazăr-Szabo	Romania	5	2	4	2	.667	24	17	7	Q
17 (18)	E Jie	China	5	3	4	2	.667	25	18	7	Q
18 (17)	Thalie Tremblay	Canada	1	3	4	2	.667	22	21	1	Q
19	Caitlin Bilodeaux	United States	6	4	4	2	.667	23	23	0	Q
20	Claudia Grigorescu	Romania	3	3	3	2	.600	20	13	7	Q
21	Xiao Aihua	China	7	2	3	2	.600	19	16	3	Q
22	Lydia Czuckermann-Hatuel	Israel	7	3	3	2	.600	22	20	2	Q
23	Giovanna Trillini	Italy	5	4	3	3	.500	25	17	8	Q
24	I Jeong-Suk	South Korea	1	4	3	3	.500	24	19	5	Q
25	Rosa María Castillejo	Spain	5	5	3	3	.500	22	18	4	Q
26	Tatyana Sadovskaya	Unified Team	2	4	3	3	.500	23	19	4	Q
27	Laurence Modaine-Cessac	France	6	5	3	3	.500	21	18	3	Q
28 (31)	Gisèle Meygret	France	1	5	3	3	.500	21	21	0	Q
29 (28)	Tamara Savić-Šotra	Independent Olympic Participants	2	5	3	3	.500	22	23	-1	Q
30 (29)	Yuko Takayanagi	Japan	1	6	3	3	.500	24	25	-1	Q
31 (30)	Sabine Bau	Germany	3	4	2	3	.400	19	17	2	Q
32 (34)	Annette Dobmeier	Germany	7	4	2	3	.400	20	18	2	Q
33 (32)	Fiona McIntosh	Great Britain	7	5	2	3	.400	15	20	-5	Q
34 (35)	Montserat Esquerdo	Spain	4	4	1	4	.200	17	21	-4	Q
35 (33)	Mary O'Neill	United States	4	5	1	4	.200	11	21	-10	Q
36	Renée Aubin	Canada	7	6	1	4	.200	14	24	-10	Q
37	Linda Strachan	Great Britain	4	6	1	4	.200	11	24	-13	
37	Kim Jin-sun	South Korea	3	5	1	4	.200	11	24	-13	
39	Molly Sullivan	United States	3	6	1	4	.200	7	21	-14	
40	Andrea Chiuchich	Argentina	2	6	1	5	.167	15	25	-10	
41	Julia Bracewell	Great Britain	6	6	1	5	.167	16	29	-13	
42	Sandra Giancola	Argentina	5	6	1	5	.167	9	27	-18	
43	Yanina Iannuzzi	Argentina	6	7	0	6	.000	11	30	-19	
44	Heidi Botha	South Africa	1	7	0	6	.000	8	30	-22	
45	Elvia Reyes	Honduras	5	7	0	6	.000	5	30	-25	
46	Rencia Nasson	South Africa	2	7	0	6	.000	3	30	-27	

=== Elimination rounds ===
==== Main brackets ====
===== Main bracket 1 =====
O'Neill was eliminated after the round of 64. The losers in the round of 32 faced off, with Stefanek beating Maciejewska and I beating Castillejo to advance to the repechage. The losers of the round of 16, Tremblay and Funkenhauser, advanced directly to the first round of the repechage. Wang, having lost in the round of 8, went to the third round of the repechage. McIntosh won the bracket, advancing to the quarterfinals.

Round of 64
33	Mary O'Neill (USA)	3	0
32	Fiona McIntosh (GBR)	5	5

Round of 32
1	Gertrúd Stefanek (HUN)	4	4
32	Fiona McIntosh (GBR)	6	6
17	Thalie Tremblay (CAN)	6	6
16	Monika Maciejewska (POL)	4	4
9	Wang Huifeng (CHN)	3	5	5
24	I Jeong-Suk (KOR)	5	2	1
25	Rosa María Castillejo (ESP)	1	2
8	Zita-Eva Funkenhauser (GER)	5	5

Round of 16
32	Fiona McIntosh (GBR)	6	5
17	Thalie Tremblay (CAN)	5	0
9	Wang Huifeng (CHN)	0	6	6
8	Zita-Eva Funkenhauser (GER)	5	5	4

Round of 8
32	Fiona McIntosh (GBR)	5	6
9	Wang Huifeng (CHN)	2	5

====== Repechage qualifiers 1 ======
Repechage qualifier
1	Gertrúd Stefanek (HUN)	5	5
16	Monika Maciejewska (POL)	3	3

Repechage qualifier
24	I Jeong-Suk (KOR)	5	3	6
25	Rosa María Castillejo (ESP)	2	5	5

===== Main bracket 2 =====
Takayanagi was eliminated after the round of 64. The losers in the round of 32 faced off, with Spennato beating Savić-Šotra and Grigorescu beating Aubin to advance to the repechage. The losers of the round of 16, Xiao and Némethné Jánosi, advanced directly to the first round of the repechage. Velichko, having lost in the round of 8, went to the third round of the repechage. Zalaffi won the bracket, advancing to the quarterfinals.

Round of 64
29	Yuko Takayanagi (JPN)	0	5	5
36	Renée Aubin (CAN)	5	2	6

Round of 32
5	Olga Velichko (EUN)	5	3	5
28	Tamara Savić-Šotra (IOP)	3	5	1
21	Xiao Aihua (CHN)	5	5
12	Isabelle Spennato (FRA)	2	2
13	Margherita Zalaffi (ITA)	5	6
20	Claudia Grigorescu (ROU)	3	4
36	Renée Aubin (CAN)	2	3
4	Zsuzsa Némethné Jánosi (HUN)	5	5

Round of 16
5	Olga Velichko (EUN)	5	1	5
21	Xiao Aihua (CHN)	3	5	1
13	Margherita Zalaffi (ITA)	3	5	5
4	Zsuzsa Némethné Jánosi (HUN)	5	3	3

Round of 8
5	Olga Velichko (EUN)	2	5	3
13	Margherita Zalaffi (ITA)	5	3	5

====== Repechage qualifiers 2 ======
Repechage qualifier
28	Tamara Savić-Šotra (IOP)	2	3
12	Isabelle Spennato (FRA)	5	5

Repechage qualifier
20	Claudia Grigorescu (ROU)	2	5	6
36	Renée Aubin (CAN)	5	3	4

===== Main bracket 3 =====
Esquerdo was eliminated after the round of 64. The losers in the round of 32 faced off, with Bortolozzi-Borella beating Bilodeaux and Czuckermann-Hatuel beating Aubin to advance to the repechage. The losers of the round of 16, Sobczak and Guzganu-Tufan, advanced directly to the first round of the repechage. Modaine-Cessac, having lost in the round of 8, went to the third round of the repechage. Bau won the bracket, advancing to the quarterfinals.

Round of 64
35	Montserat Esquerdo (ESP)	1	3
30	Sabine Bau (GER)	5	5

Round of 32
3	Francesca Bortolozzi-Borella (ITA)	2	3
30	Sabine Bau (GER)	5	5
19	Caitlin Bilodeaux (USA)	5	1
14	Anna Sobczak (POL)	6	5
11	Elisabeta Guzganu-Tufan (ROU)	5	5
22	Lydia Czuckermann-Hatuel (ISR)	0	2
27	Laurence Modaine-Cessac (FRA)	6	5
6	Yelena Glikina (EUN)	4	2

Round of 16
30	Sabine Bau (GER)	5	5
14	Anna Sobczak (POL)	2	2
11	Elisabeta Guzganu-Tufan (ROU)	4	5	2
27	Laurence Modaine-Cessac (FRA)	6	2	5

Round of 8
30	Sabine Bau (GER)	5	4	5
27	Laurence Modaine-Cessac (FRA)	3	6	3

====== Repechage qualifiers 3 ======
Repechage qualifier
3	Francesca Bortolozzi-Borella (ITA)	5	4	5
19	Caitlin Bilodeaux (USA)	1	6	2

Repechage qualifier
22	Lydia Czuckermann-Hatuel (ISR)	6	1	5
6	Yelena Glikina (EUN)	5	5	3

===== Main bracket 4 =====
Esquerdo was eliminated after the round of 64. The losers in the round of 32 faced off, with Sadovskaya beating Mincza and Meygret beating E to advance to the repechage. The losers of the round of 16, Wolnicka-Szewczyk and Guzganu-Tufan, advanced directly to the first round of the repechage. Sin, having lost in the round of 8, went to the third round of the repechage. Lazăr-Szabo won the bracket, advancing to the quarterfinals.

Round of 64
31	Gisèle Meygret (FRA)	2	5	5
30	Sabine Bau (GER)	5	3	2

Round of 32
7	Barbara Wolnicka-Szewczyk (POL)	4	5	5
26	Tatyana Sadovskaya (EUN)	6	2	3
23	Giovanna Trillini (ITA)	5	1	5
10	Ildikó Nébaldné Mincza (HUN)	3	5	1
15	Reka Zsofia Lazăr-Szabo (ROU)	5	5
18	E Jie (CHN)	3	3
31	Gisèle Meygret (FRA)	3	5	4
2	Sin Seong-Ja (KOR)	5	3	6

Round of 16
7	Barbara Wolnicka-Szewczyk (POL)	0	2
23	Giovanna Trillini (ITA)	5	5
15	Reka Zsofia Lazăr-Szabo (ROU)	6	6
2	Sin Seong-Ja (KOR)	4	4

Round of 8
23	Giovanna Trillini (ITA)	1	2
15	Reka Zsofia Lazăr-Szabo (ROU)	5	5

====== Repechage qualifiers 4 ======
Repechage qualifier
26	Tatyana Sadovskaya (EUN)	2	5	6
10	Ildikó Nébaldné Mincza (HUN)	5	2	4

Repechage qualifier
18	E Jie (CHN)	5	3	1
31	Gisèle Meygret (FRA)	3	5	5

==== Repechage rounds 1 and 2 ====
The fencers were reseeded: the eight fencers who had lost in the round of 16 were reseeded as 1–8 while the eight fencers who had lost in the round of 32 but won the repechage qualifiers were reseeded as 9–16. For example, original seed #1 Stefanek was reseeded as #9 because she was the top-seeded fencer who had advanced through the repechage qualifiers. Seeds were adjusted to avoid rematches from the main bracket—Meygret and Sadovskaya were swapped to avoid a Meygret–Sin rematch. Original seeds are shown in parentheses in the brackets.

R1 seed	O seed	Fencer	Nation
From round of 16
1	2	Sin Seong-Ja	South Korea
2	4	Zsuzsa Némethné Jánosi	Hungary
3	7	Barbara Wolnicka-Szewczyk	Poland
4	8	Zita-Eva Funkenhauser	Germany
5	11	Elisabeta Guzganu-Tufan	Romania
6	14	Anna Sobczak	Poland
7	17	Thalie Tremblay	Canada
8	21	Xiao Aihua	China
From round of 32 and qualifiers
9	1	Gertrúd Stefanek	Hungary
10	3	Francesca Bortolozzi-Borella	Italy
11	12	Isabelle Spennato	France
12	20	Claudia Grigorescu	Romania
13	22	Lydia Czuckermann-Hatuel	Israel
14	24	I Jeong-Suk	South Korea
15	31	Gisèle Meygret	France
16	26	Tatyana Sadovskaya	Unified Team

===== Repechage rounds 1 and 2 bracket 1 =====
Repechage round 1				Repechage round 2
1 (2)	Sin Seong-Ja (KOR)	3	2
16 (26)	Tatyana Sadovskaya (EUN)	5	5	16 (26)	Tatyana Sadovskaya (EUN)	6	6
9 (1)	Gertrúd Stefanek (HUN)	4	2	8 (21)	Xiao Aihua (CHN)	5	5
8 (21)	Xiao Aihua (CHN)	6	5

===== Repechage rounds 1 and 2 bracket 2 =====
Repechage round 1					Repechage round 2
5 (11)	Elisabeta Guzganu-Tufan (ROU)	6	3	2
12 (22)	Claudia Grigorescu (ROU)	5	5	5	12 (22)	Claudia Grigorescu (ROU)	5	5	5
13 (22)	Lydia Czuckermann-Hatuel (ISR)	1	3		4 (8)	Zita-Eva Funkenhauser (GER)	6	2	1
4 (8)	Zita-Eva Funkenhauser (GER)	5	5

===== Repechage rounds 1 and 2 bracket 3 =====
Repechage round 1				Repechage round 2
3 (7)	Barbara Wolnicka-Szewczyk (POL)	2	3
14 (24)	I Jeong-Suk (KOR)	5	5	14 (24)	I Jeong-Suk (KOR)	6	5	5
11 (12)	Isabelle Spennato (FRA)	4	5	6 (14)	Anna Sobczak (POL)	4	6	6
6 (14)	Anna Sobczak (POL)	6	6

===== Repechage rounds 1 and 2 bracket 4 =====
Repechage round 1					Repechage round 2
7 (17)	Thalie Tremblay (CAN)	3	5	5
10 (3)	Francesca Bortolozzi-Borella (ITA)	5	2	2	7 (17)	Thalie Tremblay (CAN)	1	3
15 (31)	Gisèle Meygret (FRA)	4	4		2 (4)	Zsuzsa Némethné Jánosi (HUN)	5	5
2 (4)	Zsuzsa Némethné Jánosi (HUN)	6	6

==== Repechage round 3 ====
The fencers were reseeded again. Seeds 1–4 were given to round 8 losers, based on their original seeds (excluding adjustments to avoid having multiple fencers from the same nation in a bracket, which affected Köves and Nolte). Seeds 5–8 were given to the winners of the second round of the repechage, based on their original seeds.

R3 seed	R1 seed	O seed	Fencer	Nation
From round of 8
1	–	5	Olga Velichko	Unified Team
2	–	9	Wang Huifeng	China
3	–	23	Giovanna Trillini	Italy
4	–	27	Laurence Modaine-Cessac	France
From repechage round 2
5	2	4	Zsuzsa Némethné Jánosi	Hungary
6	6	14	Anna Sobczak	Poland
7	12	20	Claudia Grigorescu	Romania
8	16	26	Tatyana Sadovskaya	Unified Team

===== Repechage round 3 bracket 1 =====
Repechage round 3
1 (5)	Olga Velichko (EUN)	6	2	2
8 (26)	Tatyana Sadovskaya (EUN)	4	5	5

===== Repechage round 3 bracket 2 =====
Repechage round 3
5 (4)	Zsuzsa Némethné Jánosi (HUN)	3	4
4 (27)	Laurence Modaine-Cessac (FRA)	5	6

===== Repechage round 3 bracket 3 =====
Repechage round 3
3 (23)	Giovanna Trillini (ITA)	6	5
6 (14)	Anna Sobczak (POL)	4	2

===== Repechage round 3 bracket 4 =====
Repechage round 3
7 (20)	Claudia Grigorescu (ROU)	1	2
2 (9)	Wang Huifeng (CHN)	5	5

=== Final rounds ===
The fencers were reseeded a final time. Seeds 1–4 were given to the round of 8 winners, based on their original seeds. Seeds 5–8 were given to the winners of the third round of the repechage, based on their original seeds.

F seed	R3 seed	R1 seed	O seed	Fencer	Nation
From round of 8
1	–	–	13	Margherita Zalaffi	Italy
2	–	–	15	Reka Zsofia Lazăr-Szabo	Romania
3	–	–	30	Sabine Bau	Germany
4	–	–	32	Fiona McIntosh	Great Britain
From repechage round 3
5	2	–	9	Wang Huifeng	China
6	3	–	23	Giovanna Trillini	Italy
7	8	16	26	Tatyana Sadovskaya	Unified Team
8	4	–	27	Laurence Modaine-Cessac	France

Quarterfinals
1 (13)	Margherita Zalaffi (ITA)	3	1
8 (27)	Laurence Modaine-Cessac (FRA)	5	5
5 (9)	Wang Huifeng (CHN)	6	5
4 (32)	Fiona McIntosh (GBR)	5	1
3 (30)	Sabine Bau (GER)	3	4	2
6 (23)	Giovanna Trillini (ITA)	5	6
7 (26)	Tatyana Sadovskaya (EUN)	0	5	5
2 (15)	Reka Zsofia Lazăr-Szabo (ROU)	5	2	2

Semifinals
8 (27)	Laurence Modaine-Cessac (FRA)	0	5	3
5 (9)	Wang Huifeng (CHN)	5	2	5
6 (23)	Giovanna Trillini (ITA)	5	3	5
7 (26)	Tatyana Sadovskaya (EUN)	2	5	3

Final
5 (9)	Wang Huifeng (CHN)	6	3	5
6 (23)	Giovanna Trillini (ITA)	5	5	6
Bronze match
8 (27)	Laurence Modaine-Cessac (FRA)	1	5	3
7 (26)	Tatyana Sadovskaya (EUN)	5	1	5

== Final classification ==
Fencer	Country
Giovanna Trillini	Italy
Wang Huifeng	China
Tatyana Sadovskaya	Unified Team
Laurence Modaine-Cessac	France
Margherita Zalaffi	Italy
Reka Zsofia Lazăr-Szabo	Romania
Sabine Bau	Germany
Fiona McIntosh	Great Britain
Zsuzsa Némethné Jánosi	Hungary
Olga Velichko	Unified Team
Anna Sobczak	Poland
Claudia Grigorescu	Romania
Zita-Eva Funkenhauser	Germany
Thalie Tremblay	Canada
Xiao Aihua	China
I Jeong-Suk	South Korea
Gertrúd Stefanek	Hungary
Sin Seong-Ja	South Korea
Francesca Bortolozzi-Borella	Italy
Barbara Wolnicka-Szewczyk	Poland
Elisabeta Guzganu-Tufan	Romania
Isabelle Spennato	France
Lydia Czuckermann-Hatuel	Israel
Gisèle Meygret	France
Yelena Glikina	Unified Team
Ildikó Nébaldné Mincza	Hungary
Monika Maciejewska	Poland
E Jie	China
Caitlin Bilodeaux	United States
Rosa María Castillejo	Spain
Tamara Savić-Šotra	Independent Olympic Participants
Renée Aubin	Canada
Yuko Takayanagi	Japan
Annette Dobmeier	Germany
Montserat Esquerdo	Spain
Mary O'Neill	United States
Linda Strachan	Great Britain
Kim Jin-sun	South Korea
Molly Sullivan	United States
Andrea Chiuchich	Argentina
Julia Bracewell	Great Britain
Sandra Giancola	Argentina
Yanina Iannuzzi	Argentina
Heidi Botha	South Africa
Elvia Reyes	Honduras
Rencia Nasson	South Africa
