= Fencing at the 1992 Summer Olympics – Women's team foil =

Fencing at the Olympics

Women's team foil at the Games of the XXV Olympiad
- Venue: Palace of Metallurgy
- Dates: 3 – 4 August 1992
- Competitors: 60 from 12 nations

Medalists
1st place, gold medalist(s)		Giovanna Trillini, Margherita Zalaffi, Francesca Bortolozzi-Borella, Diana Bianchedi, Dorina Vaccaroni	Italy
2nd place, silver medalist(s)		Zita-Eva Funkenhauser, Sabine Bau, Anja Fichtel-Mauritz, Monika Weber-Koszto, Annette Dobmeier	Germany
3rd place, bronze medalist(s)		Reka Zsofia Lazăr-Szabo, Claudia Grigorescu, Elisabeta Guzganu-Tufan, Laura Cârlescu-Badea, Roxana Dumitrescu	Romania

The women's team foil was one of eight fencing events on the fencing at the 1992 Summer Olympics programme. It was the ninth appearance of the event. The competition was held from 3 to 4 August 1992. 60 fencers from 12 nations competed.

== Rosters ==
Canada

- Thalie Tremblay
- Renée Aubin
- Hélène Bourdages
- Shelley Wetterberg
- Marie-Françoise Hervieu

China

- E Jie
- Liang Jun
- Wang Huifeng
- Xiao Aihua
- Ye Lin

France

- Camille Couzi
- Gisèle Meygret
- Laurence Modaine-Cessac
- Julie-Anne Gross
- Isabelle Spennato

Germany

- Zita-Eva Funkenhauser
- Sabine Bau
- Anja Fichtel-Mauritz
- Monika Weber-Koszto
- Annette Dobmeier

Great Britain

- Fiona McIntosh
- Linda Strachan
- Julia Bracewell
- Amanda Ferguson
- Sarah Mawby

Hungary

- Gabriella Lantos
- Ildikó Nébaldné Mincza
- Zsuzsa Némethné Jánosi
- Ildikó Pusztai
- Gertrúd Stefanek

Italy

- Giovanna Trillini
- Margherita Zalaffi
- Francesca Bortolozzi-Borella
- Diana Bianchedi
- Dorina Vaccaroni

Poland

- Katarzyna Felusiak
- Monika Maciejewska
- Anna Sobczak
- Barbara Wolnicka-Szewczyk
- Agnieszka Szuchnicka

Romania

- Reka Zsofia Lazăr-Szabo
- Claudia Grigorescu
- Elisabeta Guzganu-Tufan
- Laura Cârlescu-Badea
- Roxana Dumitrescu

South Korea

- I Jeong-Suk
- Sin Seong-Ja
- Kim Jin-sun
- Jang Mi-Gyeong
- Jeon Mi-Gyeong

Unified Team

- Yelena Glikina
- Yelena Grishina
- Tatyana Sadovskaya
- Olga Velichko
- Olga Voshchakina

United States

- Caitlin Bilodeaux
- Mary O'Neill
- Molly Sullivan
- Ann Marsh
- Sharon Monplaisir

== Results ==
=== Round 1 ===
==== Round 1 Pool A ====
Pos	Team	W	L	BW	BL	Qual.
1	Italy	2	0	18	2	QQ
2	Poland	1	1	10	13	QQ
3	South Korea	0	2	5	18	

Source: Official Report, vol. 2, p. 209

==== Round 1 Pool B ====
Pos	Team	W	L	BW	BL	Qual.
1	Unified Team	2	0	18	5	QQ
2	Hungary	1	1	13	10	QQ
3	Great Britain	0	2	2	18	

Source: Official Report, vol. 2, p. 209

==== Round 1 Pool C ====
Pos	Team	W	L	BW	BL	Qual.
1	Germany	2	0	18	5	QQ
2	Romania	1	1	14	9	QQ
3	Canada	0	2	0	18	

Source: Official Report, vol. 2, p. 209

==== Round 1 Pool D ====
Pos	Team	W	L	BW	BL	Qual.
1	China	2	0	17	10	QQ
2	France	1	1	15	13	QQ
3	United States	0	2	9	18	

Source: Official Report, vol. 2, p. 209

=== Elimination rounds ===
Fifth place
D1	China	5
D2	France	9
Seventh place
B2	Hungary	9
A2	Poland	7

Consolation semifinals
B2	Hungary	8
D1	China	8
D2	France	9
A2	Poland	4

Quarterfinals
A1	Italy	9
B2	Hungary	2
C2	Romania	8
D1	China	7
D2	France	8
C1	Germany	8
B1	Unified Team	9
A2	Poland	7

Semifinals
A1	Italy	9
C2	Romania	3
C1	Germany	9
B1	Unified Team	4

Final
A1	Italy	9
C1	Germany	6
Third place
C2	Romania	8
B1	Unified Team	8
