= Fencing at the 1988 Summer Olympics – Women's foil =

Fencing at the Olympics

Women's foil at the Games of the XXIV Olympiad
- Venue: Olympic Fencing Gymnasium
- Dates: 21–22 September 1988
- Competitors: 45 from 19 nations

Medalists
1st place, gold medalist(s)		Anja Fichtel-Mauritz	West Germany
2nd place, silver medalist(s)		Sabine Bau	West Germany
3rd place, bronze medalist(s)		Zita-Eva Funkenhauser	West Germany

The women's foil was one of eight fencing events on the fencing at the 1988 Summer Olympics programme. It was the thirteenth appearance of the event. The competition was held from 21 to 22 September 1988. 45 fencers from 19 nations competed.

== Competition format ==
The 1988 tournament used a three-phase format very similar to that of 1984. Unlike the men's foil and épée competitions (but like the men's sabre), the women's foil tournament kept the size of the second phase (double elimination) round at 16 fencers (compared to expanding to 32 for men's foil and épée).

The first phase was a multi-round round-robin pool play format; each fencer in a pool faced each other fencer in that pool once. There were three pool rounds:

- The first round had 9 pools of 5 fencers each, with the top 4 in each pool advancing.
- The second round had 6 pools of 6 fencers each, with the top 4 in each pool advancing.
- The third round had 4 pools of 6 fencers each, with the top 4 in each pool advancing.

The second phase was a truncated double-elimination tournament. Four fencers advanced to the final round through the winners brackets and four more advanced via the repechage.

The final phase was a single elimination tournament with a bronze medal match.

Bouts in the round-robin pools were to 5 touches; bouts in the double-elimination and final rounds were to 8 touches (unlike men's fencing, which had bouts to 10 touches).

== Results ==
=== Round 1 ===
==== Round 1 Pool A ====
Pos	Fencer	W	L	TF	TA	Qual.	ZEF	BLG	TO	EK	SK
1	Zita-Eva Funkenhauser (FRG)	4	0	20	6	Q		5–1	5–1	5–0	5–4
2	Brigitte Latrille-Gaudin (FRA)	2	2	15	12	Q	1–5		5–2	4–5	5–0
3	Tomoko Oka (JPN)	2	2	13	13	Q	1–5	2–5		5–2	5–1
4	Edit Kovács (HUN)	2	2	12	14	Q	0–5	5–4	2–5		5–0
5	Silvia Koeswandi (INA)	0	4	5	20		4–5	0–5	1–5	0–5	

Source: Official Report, vol. 2, p. 401

==== Round 1 Pool B ====
Pos	Fencer	W	L	TF	TA	Qual.	LMC	ZNJ	SM	LAM	AC
1	Laurence Modaine-Cessac (FRA)	4	0	20	16	Q		5–4	5–4	5–4	5–4
2	Zsuzsa Némethné Jánosi (HUN)	3	1	19	11	Q	4–5		5–3	5–2	5–1
3	Sharon Monplaisir (USA)	2	2	17	15	Q	4–5	3–5		5–4	5–1
4	Linda Ann Martin (GBR)	1	3	15	17	Q	4–5	2–5	4–5		5–2
5	Andrea Chaplin (AUS)	0	4	8	20		4–5	1–5	1–5	2–5	

Source: Official Report, vol. 2, p. 401

==== Round 1 Pool C ====
Pos	Fencer	W	L	TF	TA	Qual.	CB	AS	JL	SSJ	YYK
1	Caitlin Bilodeaux (USA)	3	1	18	10	Q		5–3	3–5	5–2	5–0
2	Anna Sobczak (POL)	3	1	18	11	Q	3–5		5–2	5–4	5–0
3	Jujie Luan (CHN)	2	2	16	13	Q	5–3	2–5		4–5	5–0
4	Sin Seong-Ja (KOR)	2	2	16	16	Q	2–5	4–5	5–4		5–2
5	Yung Yim King (HKG)	0	4	2	20		0–5	0–5	0–5	2–5	

Source: Official Report, vol. 2, p. 401

==== Round 1 Pool D ====
Pos	Fencer	W	L	TF	TA	Qual.	DV	TS	ZQ	MO	MM
1	Dorina Vaccaroni (ITA)	4	0	20	11	Q		5–3	5–4	5–0	5–4
2	Tatyana Sadovskaya (URS)	3	1	18	14	Q	3–5		5–2	5–4	5–3
3	Zhu Qingyuan (CHN)	2	2	16	14	Q	4–5	2–5		5–1	5–3
4	Mary O'Neill (USA)	1	3	10	18	Q	0–5	4–5	1–5		5–3
5	Mieko Miyahara (JPN)	0	4	13	20		4–5	3–5	3–5	3–5	

Source: Official Report, vol. 2, p. 401

==== Round 1 Pool E ====
Pos	Fencer	W	L	TF	TA	Qual.	AF	SH	AD	FM	PEH
1	Anja Fichtel (FRG)	4	0	20	6	Q		5–0	5–4	5–1	5–1
2	Sun Hongyun (CHN)	3	1	15	10	Q	0–5		5–4	5–1	5–0
3	Agnieszka Dubrawska (POL)	2	2	18	15	Q	4–5	4–5		5–4	5–1
4	Fiona McIntosh (GBR)	1	3	11	18	Q	1–5	1–5	4–5		5–3
5	Park Eun-Hui (KOR)	0	4	5	20		1–5	0–5	1–5	3–5	

Source: Official Report, vol. 2, p. 401

==== Round 1 Pool F ====
Pos	Fencer	W	L	TF	TA	Qual.	LT	EGT	IS	TT	AP
1	Liz Thurley (GBR)	4	0	20	13	Q		5–4	5–1	5–4	5–4
2	Elisabeta Guzganu-Tufan (ROU)	3	1	19	9	Q	4–5		5–3	5–0	5–1
3	Isabelle Spennato (FRA)	2	2	14	14	Q	1–5	3–5		5–3	5–1
4	Thalie Tremblay (CAN)	1	3	12	18	Q	4–5	0–5	3–5		5–3
5	Andrea Piros (SUI)	0	4	9	20		4–5	1–5	1–5	3–5	

Source: Official Report, vol. 2, p. 401

==== Round 1 Pool G ====
Pos	Fencer	W	L	TF	TA	Qual.	MZ	GS	MP	JK	AM
1	Margherita Zalaffi (ITA)	3	1	17	8	Q		2–5	5–1	5–1	5–1
2	Gertrúd Stefanek (HUN)	2	2	18	14	Q	5–2		4–5	4–5	5–2
3	Madeleine Philion (CAN)	2	2	12	16	Q	1–5	5–4		5–2	1–5
4	Jolanta Królikowska (POL)	2	2	13	17	Q	1–5	5–4	2–5		5–3
5	Akemi Morikawa (JPN)	1	3	11	16		1–5	2–5	5–1	3–5	

Source: Official Report, vol. 2, p. 401

==== Round 1 Pool H ====
Pos	Fencer	W	L	TF	TA	Qual.	SB	YG	KP	RZLS	FL
1	Sabine Bau (FRG)	4	3	20	14	Q		5–2	5–4	5–4	5–4
2	Yelena Glikina (URS)	3	1	17	11	Q	2–5		5–2	5–3	5–1
3	Kerstin Palm (SWE)	2	2	16	15	Q	4–5	2–5		5–1	5–4
4	Reka Zsofia Lazăr-Szabo (ROU)	1	3	13	15	Q	4–5	3–5	1–5		5–0
5	Fabiana López (MEX)	0	4	9	20		4–5	1–5	4–5	0–5	

Source: Official Report, vol. 2, p. 401

==== Round 1 Pool I ====
Pos	Fencer	W	L	TF	TA	Qual.	TJI	OV	AG	JP	AM
1	Tak Jeong-Im (KOR)	3	1	17	13	Q		5–4	5–3	2–5	5–1
2	Olga Voshchakina (URS)	2	2	17	14	Q	4–5		5–3	3–5	5–1
3	Annapia Gandolfi (ITA)	2	2	16	14	Q	3–5	3–5		5–1	5–3
4	Jacynthe Poirier (CAN)	2	2	11	15	Q	5–2	5–3	1–5		0–5
5	Alessandra Mariéthoz (SUI)	1	3	10	15		1–5	1–5	3–5	5–0	

Source: Official Report, vol. 2, p. 401

=== Round 2 ===
==== Round 2 Pool A ====
Pos	Fencer	W	L	TF	TA	Qual.	YG	SH	ZEF	TO	KP	MO
1	Yelena Glikina (URS)	4	1	24	11	Q		4–5	5–2	5–0	5–2	5–2
2	Sun Hongyun (CHN)	4	1	20	19	Q	5–4		0–5	5–3	5–3	5–4
3	Zita-Eva Funkenhauser (FRG)	3	2	19	13	Q	2–5	5–0		2–5	5–3	5–0
4	Tomoko Oka (JPN)	3	2	18	17	Q	0–5	3–5	5–2		5–2	5–3
5	Kerstin Palm (SWE)	2	3	15	21		2–5	3–5	3–5	2–5		5–1
6	Mary O'Neill (USA)	0	5	10	25		2–5	4–5	0–5	3–5	1–5	

Source: Official Report, vol. 2, p. 401

==== Round 2 Pool B ====
Pos	Fencer	W	L	TF	TA	Qual.	TJI	AF	IS	AS	AG	TT
1	Tak Jeong-Im (KOR)	5	0	25	17	Q		5–4	5–4	5–3	5–2	5–4
2	Anja Fichtel (FRG)	3	2	22	14	Q	4–5		3–5	5–3	5–1	5–0
3	Isabelle Spennato (FRA)	2	3	19	19	Q	4–5	5–3		1–5	4–5	5–1
4	Anna Sobczak (POL)	2	3	20	20	Q	3–5	3–5	5–1		4–5	5–4
5	Annapia Gandolfi (ITA)	2	3	15	23		2–5	1–5	5–4	5–4		2–5
6	Thalie Tremblay (CAN)	1	4	14	22		4–5	0–5	1–5	4–5	5–2	

Source: Official Report, vol. 2, p. 401

==== Round 2 Pool C ====
Pos	Fencer	W	L	TF	TA	Qual.	TS	DV	ZNJ	SSJ	LAM	SM
1	Tatyana Sadovskaya (URS)	4	1	22	12	Q		2–5	5–3	5–1	5–3	5–0
2	Dorina Vaccaroni (ITA)	3	2	20	15	Q	5–2		2–5	3–5	5–3	5–0
3	Zsuzsa Némethné Jánosi (HUN)	3	2	22	18	Q	3–5	5–2		5–4	5–2	4–5
4	Sin Seong-Ja (KOR)	3	2	20	21	Q	1–5	5–3	4–5		5–4	5–4
5	Linda Ann Martin (GBR)	1	4	17	22		3–5	3–5	2–5	4–5		5–2
6	Sharon Monplaisir (USA)	1	4	11	24		0–5	0–5	5–4	4–5	2–5	

Source: Official Report, vol. 2, p. 401

==== Round 2 Pool D ====
Pos	Fencer	W	L	TF	TA	Qual.	CB	GS	LT	FM	JP	ZQ
1	Caitlin Bilodeaux (USA)	4	1	22	14	Q		2–5	5–2	5–1	5–4	5–2
2	Gertrúd Stefanek (HUN)	4	1	20	14	Q	5–2		0–5	5–4	5–0	5–3
3	Liz Thurley (GBR)	3	2	19	17	Q	2–5	5–0		5–3	2–5	5–4
4	Fiona McIntosh (GBR)	2	3	18	20	Q	1–5	4–5	3–5		5–3	5–2
5	Jacynthe Poirier (CAN)	1	4	15	22		4–5	0–5	5–2	3–5		3–5
6	Zhu Qingyuan (CHN)	1	4	16	23		2–5	3–5	4–5	2–5	5–3	

Source: Official Report, vol. 2, p. 401

==== Round 2 Pool E ====
Pos	Fencer	W	L	TF	TA	Qual.	MZ	SB	RZLS	EK	BLG	AD
1	Margherita Zalaffi (ITA)	4	1	22	16	Q		2–5	5–3	5–4	5–2	5–2
2	Sabine Bau (FRG)	4	1	20	15	Q	5–2		0–5	5–1	5–3	5–4
3	Reka Zsofia Lazăr-Szabo (ROU)	2	3	16	16	Q	3–5	5–0		2–5	1–5	5–1
4	Edit Kovács (HUN)	2	3	19	21	Q	4–5	1–5	5–2		4–5	5–4
5	Brigitte Latrille-Gaudin (FRA)	2	3	17	20		2–5	3–5	5–1	5–4		2–5
6	Agnieszka Dubrawska (POL)	1	4	16	22		2–5	4–5	1–5	4–5	5–2	

Source: Official Report, vol. 2, p. 402

==== Round 2 Pool F ====
Pos	Fencer	W	L	TF	TA	Qual.	EGT	OV	MP	JK	JL	LMC
1	Elisabeta Guzganu-Tufan (ROU)	4	1	21	18	Q		5–2	5–4	1–5	5–4	5–3
2	Olga Voshchakina (URS)	3	2	21	19	Q	2–5		4–5	5–3	5–4	5–2
3	Madeleine Philion (CAN)	3	2	23	21	Q	4–5	5–4		5–3	4–5	5–4
4	Jolanta Królikowska (POL)	2	3	18	18	Q	5–1	3–5	3–5		2–5	5–2
5	Jujie Luan (CHN)	2	3	21	21		4–5	4–5	5–4	5–2		3–5
6	Laurence Modaine-Cessac (FRA)	1	4	16	23		3–5	2–5	4–5	2–5	5–3	

Source: Official Report, vol. 2, p. 402

=== Round 3 ===
==== Round 3 Pool A ====
Pos	Fencer	W	L	TF	TA	Qual.	SH	OV	EK	TJI	EGT	TO
1	Sun Hongyun (CHN)	4	1	23	16	Q		3–5	5–4	5–0	5–3	5–4
2	Olga Voshchakina (URS)	3	2	20	17	Q	5–3		5–4	1–5	4–5	5–0
3	Edit Kovács (HUN)	2	3	21	21	Q	4–5	4–5		5–3	5–3	3–5
4	Tak Jeong-Im (KOR)	2	3	16	17	Q	0–5	5–1	3–5		3–5	5–1
5	Elisabeta Guzganu-Tufan (ROU)	2	3	20	22		3–5	5–4	3–5	5–3		4–5
6	Tomoko Oka (JPN)	2	3	15	22		4–5	0–5	5–3	1–5	5–4	

Source: Official Report, vol. 2, p. 402

==== Round 3 Pool B ====
Pos	Fencer	W	L	TF	TA	Qual.	SSJ	DV	YG	SB	MP	FM
1	Sin Seong-Ja (KOR)	5	0	25	10	Q		5–2	5–4	5–2	5–1	5–1
2	Dorina Vaccaroni (ITA)	4	1	22	15	Q	2–5		5–0	5–4	5–4	5–2
3	Yelena Glikina (URS)	2	3	16	16	Q	4–5	0–5		2–5	5–1	5–0
4	Sabine Bau (FRG)	2	3	19	20	Q	2–5	4–5	5–2		3–5	5–3
5	Madeleine Philion (CAN)	2	3	16	21		1–5	4–5	1–5	5–3		5–3
6	Fiona McIntosh (GBR)	0	5	9	25		1–5	2–5	0–5	3–5	3–5	

Source: Official Report, vol. 2, p. 402

==== Round 3 Pool C ====
Pos	Fencer	W	L	TF	TA	Qual.	MZ	TS	AF	ZNJ	RZLS	AS
1	Margherita Zalaffi (ITA)	4	1	24	10	Q		4–5	5–1	5–1	5–2	5–1
2	Tatyana Sadovskaya (URS)	4	1	22	18	Q	5–4		5–3	2–5	5–4	5–2
3	Anja Fichtel (FRG)	3	2	19	17	Q	1–5	3–5		5–1	5–3	5–3
4	Zsuzsa Némethné Jánosi (HUN)	3	2	17	17	Q	1–5	5–2	1–5		5–1	5–4
5	Reka Zsofia Lazăr-Szabo (ROU)	1	4	15	22		2–5	4–5	3–5	1–5		5–2
6	Anna Sobczak (POL)	0	5	12	25		1–5	2–5	3–5	4–5	2–5	

Source: Official Report, vol. 2, p. 402

==== Round 3 Pool D ====
Pos	Fencer	W	L	TF	TA	Qual.	GS	CB	ZEF	JK	LT	IS
1	Gertrúd Stefanek (HUN)	4	1	23	19	Q		5–4	5–3	5–4	3–5	5–3
2	Caitlin Bilodeaux (USA)	3	2	20	17	Q	4–5		5–1	1–5	5–4	5–2
3	Zita-Eva Funkenhauser (FRG)	3	2	19	18	Q	3–5	1–5		5–4	5–3	5–1
4	Jolanta Królikowska (POL)	2	3	20	17	Q	4–5	5–1	4–5		2–5	5–1
5	Liz Thurley (GBR)	2	3	18	20		5–3	4–5	3–5	5–2		1–5
6	Isabelle Spennato (FRA)	1	4	12	21		3–5	2–5	1–5	1–5	5–1	

Source: Official Report, vol. 2, p. 402

=== Double elimination rounds ===
==== Winners brackets ====
===== Winners group 1 =====
Round of 16		Round of 8
Margherita Zalaffi (ITA)	8
Edit Kovács (HUN)	5	Margherita Zalaffi (ITA)	7
Yelena Glikina (URS)	8	Yelena Glikina (URS)	8
Tak Jeong-Im (KOR)	7

===== Winners group 2 =====
Round of 16		Round of 8
Sun Hongyun (CHN)	8
Olga Voshchakina (URS)	6	Sun Hongyun (CHN)	5
Sabine Bau (FRG)	7	Gertrúd Stefanek (HUN)	8
Gertrúd Stefanek (HUN)	8

===== Winners group 3 =====
Round of 16		Round of 8
Sin Seong-Ja (KOR)	3
Zsuzsa Némethné Jánosi (HUN)	8	Zsuzsa Némethné Jánosi (HUN)	4
Zita-Eva Funkenhauser (FRG)	8	Zita-Eva Funkenhauser (FRG)	8
Dorina Vaccaroni (ITA)	7

===== Winners group 4 =====
Round of 16		Round of 8
Caitlin Bilodeaux (USA)	1
Anja Fichtel (FRG)	8	Anja Fichtel (FRG)	8
Jolanta Królikowska (POL)	6	Tatyana Sadovskaya (URS)	4
Tatyana Sadovskaya (URS)	8

==== Repechages ====
===== Repechage 1 =====
Round of 4		Round of 2
Edit Kovács (HUN)	7
Tak Jeong-Im (KOR)	8	Tak Jeong-Im (KOR)	4
		Tatyana Sadovskaya (URS)	8

===== Repechage 2 =====
Round of 4		Round of 2
Olga Voshchakina (URS)	2
Sabine Bau (FRG)	8	Sabine Bau (FRG)	8
		Margherita Zalaffi (ITA)	7

===== Repechage 3 =====
Round of 4		Round of 2
Sin Seong-Ja (KOR)	1
Dorina Vaccaroni (ITA)	8	Dorina Vaccaroni (ITA)	3
		Zsuzsa Némethné Jánosi (HUN)	8

===== Repechage 4 =====
Round of 4		Round of 2
Caitlin Bilodeaux (USA)	8
Jolanta Królikowska (POL)	6	Caitlin Bilodeaux (USA)	5
		Sun Hongyun (CHN)	8

=== Final round ===
Quarterfinals
Gertrúd Stefanek (HUN)	6
Sabine Bau (FRG)	8
Tatyana Sadovskaya (URS)	5
Zita-Eva Funkenhauser (FRG)	8
Anja Fichtel (FRG)	8
Sun Hongyun (CHN)	4
Zsuzsa Némethné Jánosi (HUN)	8
Yelena Glikina (URS)	4

Semifinals
Sabine Bau (FRG)	8
Zita-Eva Funkenhauser (FRG)	3
Anja Fichtel (FRG)	8
Zsuzsa Némethné Jánosi (HUN)	5

Finals
Sabine Bau (FRG)	5
Anja Fichtel (FRG)	8
Third place
Zita-Eva Funkenhauser (FRG)	8
Zsuzsa Némethné Jánosi (HUN)	7

== Final classification ==
Fencer	Country
Anja Fichtel-Mauritz	West Germany
Sabine Bau	West Germany
Zita-Eva Funkenhauser	West Germany
Zsuzsa Némethné Jánosi	Hungary
Tatyana Sadovskaya	Soviet Union
Gertrúd Stefanek	Hungary
Sun Hongyun	China
Yelena Glikina	Soviet Union
Margherita Zalaffi	Italy
Dorina Vaccaroni	Italy
Caitlin Bilodeaux	United States
Tak Jeong-Im	South Korea
Sin Seong-Ja	South Korea
Olga Voshchakina	Soviet Union
Jolanta Królikowska	Poland
Edit Kovács	Hungary
Liz Thurley	Great Britain
Elisabeta Guzganu-Tufan	Romania
Madeleine Philion	Canada
Tomoko Oka	Japan
Reka Zsofia Lazăr-Szabo	Romania
Isabelle Spennato	France
Anna Sobczak	Poland
Fiona McIntosh	Great Britain
Jujie Luan	China
Brigitte Latrille-Gaudin	France
Annapia Gandolfi	Italy
Linda Ann Martin	Great Britain
Kerstin Palm	Sweden
Agnieszka Dubrawska	Poland
Jacynthe Poirier	Canada
Zhu Qingyuan	China
Laurence Modaine-Cessac	France
Thalie Tremblay	Canada
Sharon Monplaisir	United States
Mary O'Neill	United States
Alessandra Mariéthoz	Switzerland
Akemi Morikawa	Japan
Mieko Miyahara	Japan
Andrea Piros	Switzerland
Fabiana López	Mexico
Andrea Chaplin	Australia
Silvia Koeswandi	Indonesia
Park Eun-Hui	South Korea
Yung Yim King	Hong Kong
