= Poland at the 1992 Summer Olympics =

- IOC code: POL
- NOC: Polish Olympic Committee

in Barcelona, Spain July 25, 1992 – August 9, 1992
- Competitors: 201 (149 men and 52 women) in 21 sports
- Flag bearer: Waldemar Legień
- Medals Ranked 19th: Gold 3 Silver 6 Bronze 10 Total 19

Summer Olympics appearances (overview)
- 1924; 1928; 1932; 1936; 1948; 1952; 1956; 1960; 1964; 1968; 1972; 1976; 1980; 1984; 1988; 1992; 1996; 2000; 2004; 2008; 2012; 2016; 2020; 2024; 2028

Other related appearances
- Russian Empire (1900, 1912); Austria (1908–1912)

Poland competed at the 1992 Summer Olympics in Barcelona, Spain. 201 competitors, 149 men and 52 women, took part in 136 events in 21 sports.

== Medalists ==
Medal	Name	Sport	Event	Date
Gold	Arkadiusz Skrzypaszek	Modern pentathlon	Men's individual	29 July
Gold	Maciej Czyżowicz; Dariusz Goździak; Arkadiusz Skrzypaszek	Modern pentathlon	Men's team	29 July
Gold	Waldemar Legień	Judo	Men's 86 kg	29 July
Silver	Rafał Szukała	Swimming	Men's 100 metre butterfly	27 July
Silver	Józef Tracz	Wrestling	Men's Greco-Roman 74 kg	29 July
Silver	Piotr Stępień	Wrestling	Men's Greco-Roman 82 kg	30 July
Silver	Krzysztof Siemion	Weightlifting	Men's 82.5 kg	31 July
Silver	Maciej Freimut; Wojciech Kurpiewski	Canoeing	Men's K-2 500 metres	7 August
Silver	Poland Olympic football team: Dariusz Adamczuk; Marek Bajor; Jerzy Brzęczek; Dariusz Gęsior; Marcin Jałocha; Andrzej Juskowiak; Aleksander Kłak; Andrzej Kobylański; Dariusz Koseła; Wojciech Kowalczyk; Marek Koźmiński; Tomasz Łapiński; Grzegorz Mielcarski; Arkadiusz Onyszko; Ryszard Staniek; Dariusz Szubert; Piotr Świerczewski; Mirosław Waligóra; Tomasz Wałdoch; Tomasz Wieszczycki	Football	Men's tournament	8 August
Bronze	Małgorzata Książkiewicz	Shooting	Women's 50 metre rifle three positions	30 July
Bronze	Kajetan Broniewski	Rowing	Men's single sculls	1 August
Bronze	Michał Cieślak; Wojciech Jankowski; Maciej Łasicki; Jacek Streich; Tomasz Tomiak	Rowing	Men's coxed four	1 August
Bronze	Sergiusz Wołczaniecki	Weightlifting	Men's 90 kg	1 August
Bronze	Artur Partyka	Athletics	Men's high jump	2 August
Bronze	Waldemar Malak	Weightlifting	Men's 100 kg	2 August
Bronze	Piotr Kiełpikowski; Adam Krzesiński; Cezary Siess; Ryszard Sobczak; Marian Sypniewski	Fencing	Men's team foil	5 August
Bronze	Izabela Dylewska-Światowiak	Canoeing	Women's K-1 500 metres	7 August
Bronze	Wojciech Bartnik	Boxing	Light heavyweight	7 August
Bronze	Dariusz Białkowski; Grzegorz Kotowicz	Canoeing	Men's K-2 1000 metres	8 August

== Competitors ==
The following is the list of number of competitors in the Games.

Sport	Men	Women	Total
Archery	3	3	6
Athletics	10	14	24
Badminton	1	5	6
Boxing	8	–	8
Canoeing	15	3	18
Cycling	9	0	9
Diving	1	0	1
Equestrian	4	0	4
Fencing	15	5	20
Football	16	–	16
Gymnastics	0	2	2
Judo	6	5	11
Modern pentathlon	3	–	3
Rowing	15	0	15
Sailing	3	1	4
Shooting	7	5	12
Swimming	8	6	14
Table tennis	3	0	3
Tennis	0	3	3
Weightlifting	9	–	9
Wrestling	13	–	13
Total	149	52	201

== Archery ==
Poland entered three women and three men in its fifth appearance in Olympic archery. Poland's women's archery program was much stronger, qualifying two archers for the elimination round and even winning a match while the men all fell short of the cutoff for advancing. The men's team scored better in the team round, however, placing 10th as opposed to the women's team's 16th.

Men

Athlete	Event	Ranking round		Round of 32	Round of 16	Quarterfinals	Semifinals	Final	
Athlete	Event	Score	Seed	Score	Score	Score	Score	Score	Rank
Jacek Gilewski	Individual	1261	36	Did not advance					
Konrad Kwiecień	Individual	1255	44	Did not advance					
Sławomir Napłoszek	Individual	1243	54	Did not advance					
Jacek Gilewski; Konrad Kwiecień; Sławomir Napłoszek	Team	3759	10	—N/a	South Korea; L 230-240	Did not advance			

Women

Athlete	Event	Ranking round		Round of 32	Round of 16	Quarterfinals	Semifinals	Final	
Athlete	Event	Score	Seed	Score	Score	Score	Score	Score	Rank
Edyta Korotkin	Individual	1270	32	Kim Soo-Nyung (KOR); L 92-106	Did not advance				
Iwona Okrzesik	Individual	1223	50	Did not advance					
Joanna Nowicka	Individual	1315	10	Nathalie Hibon (FRA); W 102-100	Lai Fang-Mei (TPE); L 107-109	Did not advance			
Edyta Korotkin; Iwona Okrzesik; Joanna Nowicka	Team	3808	16	—N/a	Turkey; L 213-235	Did not advance			

== Athletics ==
Men
Track & road events

Athlete	Event	Heat		Quarterfinal		Semifinal		Final	
Athlete	Event	Result	Rank	Result	Rank	Result	Rank	Result	Rank
Leszek Bebło	Marathon	—N/a						2:16.38	20
Jan Huruk	Marathon	—N/a						2:14.32	7
Robert Korzeniowski	20 km walk	—N/a						DNF	
Robert Korzeniowski	50 km walk	—N/a						DSQ	
Wiesław Perszke	Marathon	—N/a						2:16.38	21
Piotr Piekarski	800 m	1:48.51	1 Q	DSQ		Did not advance			
Paweł Woźniak	400 m hurdles	50.30	5	Did not advance					

Field events

Athlete	Event	Qualification		Final	
Athlete	Event	Distance	Position	Distance	Position
Eugeniusz Bedeniczuk	Triple jump	16.92	11 q	16.23	12
Roman Golanowski	Long jump	7.61	29	Did not advance	
Andrzej Grabarczyk	Triple jump	15.79	34	Did not advance	
Artur Partyka	High jump	2.26	13 q	2.34	Bronze medal

Women
Track & road events

Athlete	Event	Heat		Quarterfinal		Semifinal		Final	
Athlete	Event	Result	Rank	Result	Rank	Result	Rank	Result	Rank
Małgorzata Birbach	Marathon	—N/a						2:54.33	26
Anna Brzezińska	1500 m	4:08.35	9 q	—N/a		4:15.53	11	Did not advance	
Beata Kaczmarska	10 km walk	—N/a						46:34	17
Wanda Panfil	Marathon	—N/a						2:47.27	22
Katarzyna Radtke	10 km walk	—N/a						45:45	11
Małgorzata Rydz	1500 m	4:09.47	3 Q	—N/a		4:03.83	2 Q	4:01.91	7

Field events

Athlete	Event	Qualification		Final	
Athlete	Event	Distance	Position	Distance	Position
Krystyna Danilczyk-Zabawska	Shot Put	18.30	19 q	18.29	10
Beata Holub	High jump	1.90	17	Did not advance	
Donata Jancewicz	High jump	1.92	12 Q	1.88	10
Agata Karczmarek	Long jump	6.55	11 q	6.41	10
Katarzyna Majchrzak	High jump	1.88	23	Did not advance	
Genowefa Patla	Javelin throw	58.18	19	Did not advance	

Combined events – Heptathlon

Athlete	Event	100H	HJ	SP	200 m	LJ	JT	800 m	Final	Rank
Maria Kamrowska	Result	13.48	1.70	14.49	24.40	6.12	44.12	2:10.96	6263	10
Maria Kamrowska	Points	1053	855	827	943	887	747	951	6263	10
Urszula Włodarczyk	Result	13.57	1.82	13.91	24.18	6.20	43.46	2:14.96	6333	8
Urszula Włodarczyk	Points	1040	1003	788	963	912	734	893	6333	8

== Badminton ==
Athlete	Event	First round	Second round	Third round	Quarterfinal	Semifinal	Final / BM	
Athlete	Event	Opposition Score	Opposition Score	Opposition Score	Opposition Score	Opposition Score	Opposition Score	Rank
Jacek Hankiewicz	Men's singles	Fumihiko Machida (JPN); L 15–9, 13–15, 3–15	Did not advance					
Katarzyna Krasowska	Women's singles	Andrea Harsagi (HUN); W 5–11, 11–0, 11–6	Pernille Nedergaard (DEN); L 0–11, 3–11	Did not advance				
Bożena Bąk; Wioletta Wilk	Women's doubles	—N/a	Emilia Dimitrova; Nely Nedjalkova (BUL); W 17–16, 15–8	Anna Lao; Rhonda Cator (AUS); L 3–15, 12–15	Did not advance			
Bożena Haracz; Beata Syta	Women's doubles	—N/a	Finarsih; Lili Tampi (INA); W 1–15, 9–15	Did not advance				

== Boxing ==
Men

Athlete	Event	1 Round	2 Round	3 Round	Quarterfinals	Semifinals	Final
Athlete	Event	Opposition Result	Opposition Result	Opposition Result	Opposition Result	Opposition Result	Rank
Andrzej Rżany	Light Flyweight	Rajendra Prasad (IND); L 6-12	Did not advance				
Leszek Olszewski	Flyweight	Raúl González (CUB); L 7-15	Did not advance				
Robert Ciba	Bantamweight	Mohammed Sabo (NGR); L RSC-3	Did not advance				
Dariusz Snarski	Lightweight	Justin Rowsell (AUS); W RSC-3	Marco Rudolph (GER); L 1-10	Did not advance			
Wieslaw Malyszko	Welterweight	César Ramos (DOM); L 1-6	Did not advance				
Robert Buda	Middleweight	Albert Papilaya (INA); L 5-11	Did not advance				
Wojciech Bartnik	Light Heavyweight	Alex González (PUR); W 6-3	Mohamed Ben Guesmia (ALG); W 14-3	—N/a	Angel Espinosa (CUB); W 9-3	Torsten May (GER); L 6-8	Bronze medal
Krysztof Rojek	Heavyweight	Félix Savón (CUB); L RSC-2	Did not advance				

== Canoeing ==
=== Slalom ===
Athlete	Event	Preliminary				Final	
Athlete	Event	Run 1	Rank	Run 2	Rank	Best	Rank
Krzysztof Bieryt	Men's C-1	142.61	21	169.01	29	142.61	27
Zbigniew Miązek	Men's C-1	128.03	12	122.37	12	122.37	15
Grzegorz Sarata	Men's C-1	161.88	30	122.12	11	122.12	13
Krzysztof Kołomański; Michał Staniszewski	Men's C-2	142.76	9	133.75	8	133.75	10
Bogusława Knapczyk	Women's K-1	160.78	21	149.59	14	149.59	19

=== Sprint ===
Men

Athlete	Event	Heats		Repechages		Semifinals		Final	
Athlete	Event	Time	Rank	Time	Rank	Time	Rank	Time	Rank
Mariusz Walkowiak	C-1 500 m	1:58.14	5 Q	1:58.24	4 Q	2:00.28	9	Did not advance	
Tomasz Darski	C-1 1000 m	4:23.31	6 Q	4:11.11	5	Did not advance			
Grzegorz Kotowicz	K-1 500 m	1:44.58	4 Q	1:41.68	3 Q	1:43.70	8	Did not advance	
Tomasz Darski; Andrzej Sołoducha	C-2 500 m	1:46.93	7 Q	1:42.72	3	—N/a		Did not advance	
Dariusz Koszykowski; Mariusz Walkowiak	C-2 1000 m	3:38.72	4 Q	3:48.88	4	—N/a		Did not advance	
Maciej Freimut; Wojciech Kurpiewski	K-2 500 m	1:34.76	1 Q	BYE		1:29.66	2 Q	1:29.84	Silver medal
Grzegorz Kotowicz; Dariusz Białkowski	K-2 1000 m	3:30.92	4 Q	3:15.58	1 Q	3:18.55	2 Q	3:18.86	Bronze medal
Maciej Freimut; Wojciech Kurpiewski; Grzegorz Kaleta; Grzegorz Krawców	K-4 1000 m	2:55.28	2 Q	—N/a		2:59.20	4 Q	3:01.43	6

Women

Athlete	Event	Heats		Repechages		Semifinals		Final	
Athlete	Event	Time	Rank	Time	Rank	Time	Rank	Time	Rank
Izabela Dylewska	K-1 500 m	1:55.72	4 Q	—N/a		1:51.61	2 Q	1:52.36	Bronze medal
Izabela Dylewska; Elżbieta Urbańczyk	K-2 500 m	1:44.43	2 Q	—N/a		1:43.50	3 Q	1:42.44	6

== Cycling ==
Nine cyclists, all men, represented Poland in 1992.

=== Road ===
Athlete	Event	Time	Rank
Jacek Mickiewicz	Men's road race	4:35:56	22
Zbigniew Piątek	Men's road race	4:35:56	55
Andrzej Sypytkowski	Men's road race	4:35:56	6
Andrzej Sypytkowski; Grzegorz Piwowarski; Dariusz Baranowski; Marek Leśniewski	Team time trial	2:06:34	6

=== Track ===
Time trial

Athlete	Event	Time	Rank
Grzegorz Krejner	Men's time trial	1:07.235	20

Pursuit

Athlete	Event	Qualification		Quarterfinals	Semifinals	Final	
Athlete	Event	Time	Rank	Opposition Time	Opposition Time	Opposition Time	Rank
Robert Karśnicki	Men's individual pursuit	4:39.836	11 Q	Adolfo Alperi (ESP); L 4:35.184	Did not advance		13

Points race

Athlete	Event	Qualification			Final		
Athlete	Event	Points	Laps	Rank	Points	Laps	Rank
Wojciech Pawlak	Men's points race	7	1	12 Q	12	0	12

== Diving ==
Men

Athlete	Event	Preliminaries		Final	
Athlete	Event	Points	Rank	Points	Rank
Grzegorz Kozdrański	3 m springboard	228.06	32	Did not advance	
Grzegorz Kozdrański	10m platform	322.83	22	Did not advance	

== Equestrian ==
=== Eventing ===
Athlete	Horse	Event	Dressage		Cross-country			Jumping			Total	
Athlete	Horse	Event	Dressage		Cross-country			Final			Total	
Athlete	Horse	Event	Penalties	Rank	Penalties	Total	Rank	Penalties	Total	Rank	Penalties	Rank
Arkadiusz Bachur	Chutor	Individual	66,00	47	107,60	173,00	51	25,00	198,60	50	198,60	50
Bogusław Jarecki	Fant	Individual	65,20	44	73,20	138,40	36	40	178,40	42	178,40	42
Jacek Krukowski	Ibis	Individual	73,40	65	74,00	147,40	42	10,00	157,40	33	157,40	33
Piotr Piasecki	Igrek	Individual	92,00	80	51,60	143,60	38	15,00	158,60	35	158,60	35
Bogusław Jarecki; Arkadiusz Bachur; Jacek Krukowski; Piotr Piasecki	See above	Team	204.60	15	198.80	429.40	11	50	494.40	9	494.40	9

== Fencing ==
20 fencers, 15 men and 5 women represented Poland in 1992.

Men

=== Individual ===
Athlete	Event	Elimination round	Round I	Repechage Round I	Round II	Repechage Round II	Round III	Repechage Round III	Round IV	Quarterfinal	Semifinal	Final / BM	
Athlete	Event	Opposition Score	Opposition Score	Opposition Score	Opposition Score	Opposition Score	Opposition Score	Opposition Score	Opposition Score	Opposition Score	Opposition Score	Opposition Score	Rank
Piotr Kiełpikowski	Individual foil	7 Q	BYE	Yoshihide Nagano (JPN); W 5:2;5:3	BYE	Guillermo Betancourt Scull (CUB); L 1:5;4:6	Patrick Groc (FRA); W 5:1;2:5;5:3	Serhiy Holubytskiy (EUN); L 3:5;2:5	Did not advance				15
Adam Krzesiński	Individual foil	43 Q	Patrick Groc (FRA); L 3–5, 1–5	Did not advance									44
Marian Sypniewski	Individual foil	8 Q	BYE	William Gosbee (GBR); W 3:5;6:4;5:2	BYE	Serhiy Holubytskiy (EUN); W 5:3;2:5;5:3	BYE		Elvis Gregory (CUB); W 3:5;5:3;5:1	BYE	Elvis Gregory (CUB); L 0:5;5:6	Did not advance	6
Maciej Ciszewski	Individual épée	34 Q	Jang Tae-Seok (KOR); L 4:6;5:6	Did not advance									37
Witold Gadomski	Individual épée	56	Did not advance										56
Sławomir Nawrocki	Individual épée	49 Q	Kim Jeong-Gwan (KOR); W 5:1:5:2	Pavel Kolobkov (EUN); L 6:4;2:5;2:5	Angelo Mazzoni (ITA); L 2:5;3:5	Did not advance							32
Robert Kościelniakowski	Individual sabre	16Q	BYE	Jürgen Nolte (GER); L5:6;5:2;2:5	György Nebald (HUN); W 5:3;5:1	Michael Lofton (USA); W 1:5;6:4;6:5	Daniel Grigore (ROU); W 6:5;5:6;6:5	BYE	Grigory Kiriyenko (EUN); W 3:5;6:5;5:2	Jean-François Lamour (FRA); L2:5;5:1;4:6	Did not advance		7
Marek Gniewkowski	Individual sabre	21 Q	BYE	Jean-Philippe Daurelle (FRA); W 6:5;6:4	Antonio García (ESP); W 6:5;5:3	Janusz Olech (POL); L 2:5;2:5	Did not advance						19
Janusz Olech	Individual sabre	20 Q	BYE	Grigory Kiriyenko (EUN); L 6:4;2:5;4:6	Ian Williams (GBR); W 3:5;5:2;5:1	Marek Gniewkowski (POL); W 5:2;5:2	Felix Becker (GER); W 5:1;4:6;5:2	BYE	Bence Szabó (HUN); L 1:5;4:6	—N/a			12

=== Team ===
Athlete	Event	Elimination round	Quarterfinal	Semifinal	Final / BM	
Athlete	Event	Opposition Score	Opposition Score	Opposition Score	Opposition Score	Rank
Adam Krzesiński; Piotr Kiełpikowski; Marian Sypniewski; Cezary Siess; Ryszard Sobczak	Team foil	Italy; L 8-8; China; W 9-7	Unified Team; W 8-8	Cuba; L 7-9	Hungary; W 40–45	Bronze medal
Sławomir Nawrocki; Maciej Ciszewski; Witold Gadomski; Marek Stępień; Sławomir Zwierzyński	Team épée	Italy; L 2-8; Canada; L 4-9	—N/a			12
Janusz Olech; Robert Kościelniakowski; Andrzej Kostrzewa; Tadeusz Piguła; Marek Gniewkowski	Team sabre	Germany; W 3-9; Great Britain; W 9-4	Unified Team; L 2-9	Italy; W 8-8	5th place final Germany; L 6-9	6

Women

=== Individual ===
Athlete	Event	Elimination round	Round I	Repechage Round I	Round II	Repechage Round II	Round III	Repechage Round III	Round IV	Quarterfinal	Semifinal	Final / BM	
Athlete	Event	Opposition Score	Opposition Score	Opposition Score	Opposition Score	Opposition Score	Opposition Score	Opposition Score	Opposition Score	Opposition Score	Opposition Score	Opposition Score	Rank
Monika Maciejewska	Individual foil	15 Q	BYE	Thalie Tremblay (CAN); L 4:6;4:6	Gertrúd Stefanek (HUN); L 3:5;3:5	Did not advance							27
Anna Sobczak	Individual foil	14 Q	BYE	Caitlin Bilodeaux (USA); W 6:5;5:1	BYE	Sabine Bau (GER); L 2:5;2:5	Isabelle Spennato (FRA); W 6:4;6:5	I Jeong-Suk (KOR); W 4:6;6:5;6:5	BYE	Giovanna Trillini (ITA); L 4:6;2:5	Did not advance		11
Barbara Wolnicka-Szewczyk	Individual foil	7 Q	BYE	Tatyana Sadovskaya (EUN); W 4:6;5:2;5:3	BYE	Giovanna Trillini (ITA); L 0:5;2:5	I Jeong-Suk (KOR); L 2:5;3:5	Did not advance					20

=== Team ===
Athlete	Event	Elimination round	Quarterfinal	Semifinal	Final / BM	
Athlete	Event	Opposition Score	Opposition Score	Opposition Score	Opposition Score	Rank
Katarzyna Felusiak; Monika Maciejewska; Anna Sobczak; Barbara Wolnicka-Szewczyk; Agnieszka Szuchnicka	Team foil	Italy; L 1-9; South Korea; W 9-4	Unified Team; L 7-9	France; L 4-9	7th place final Hungary; L 7-9	8

== Football ==
=== Roster ===
Silver medal – Poland

Coach: Janusz Wójcik

- Dariusz Adamczuk
- Marek Bajor
- Jerzy Brzęczek
- Dariusz Gęsior
- Marcin Jałocha
- Andrzej Juskowiak
- Aleksander Kłak
- Andrzej Kobylański
- Dariusz Koseła
- Wojciech Kowalczyk
- Marek Koźmiński
- Tomasz Łapiński
- Grzegorz Mielcarski
- Arkadiusz Onyszko
- Ryszard Staniek
- Dariusz Szubert
- Piotr Świerczewski
- Mirosław Waligóra
- Tomasz Wieszczycki
- Tomasz Wałdoch

Group play

==== Group A ====
Team	Pld	W	D	L	GF	GA	GD	Pts
Poland	3	2	1	0	7	2	+5	5
Italy	3	2	0	1	3	4	−1	4
United States	3	1	1	1	6	5	+1	3
Kuwait	3	0	0	3	1	6	−5	0

July 24, 1992
20:00

Poland	2 – 0	Kuwait
Juskowiak 7', 80'	Report

Estadio La Romareda, Zaragoza
Attendance: 2.000
Referee: Escobar (PAR)

July 27, 1992
21:00

Italy	0 – 3	Poland
	Report	Juskowiak 5'; Staniek 48'; Mielcarski 90'

Estadi de Sarrià, Barcelona
Attendance: 15.000
Referee: Don (GBR)

July 29, 1992
19:00

United States	2 – 2	Poland
Imler 20'; Snow 85'	Report	Koźmiński 31'; Juskowiak 40'

Estadio La Romareda, Zaragoza
Attendance: 3.000
Referee: Kee Chong (MRI)

==== Quarter-finals ====
August 1, 1992
21:30

Poland	2 – 0	Qatar
Kowalczyk 42'; Jałocha 74'	Report

Camp Nou, Barcelona
Attendance: 25.000
Referee: Sendid (ALG)

==== Semi-finals ====
August 5, 1992
21:30

Poland	6 – 1	Australia
Kowalczyk 27', 88'; Juskowiak 43', 52', 78'; Murphy 67' (o.g.)	Report	Veart 35'

Camp Nou, Barcelona
Attendance: 45.000
Referee: Rezende de Freitas (BRA)

==== Gold medal match ====
August 8, 1992
20:00

Poland	2 – 3	Spain
Kowalczyk 44'; Staniek 76'	Report	Abelardo 65'; Kiko 72', 90'

Camp Nou, Barcelona
Attendance: 95.000
Referee: Torres Cadena (COL)

== Gymnastics ==
=== Rhythmic Gymnastics ===
Athlete	Event	Preliminary Round						Final		
Athlete	Event	Rope	Hoop	Ball	Clubs	Total	Prelim Total	Total	Final Total	Rank
Eliza Bialkowska	Individual	9.250 \	9.350; 9.400	9.200 \	8.925 \	36,725	14 Q	9.400	27.762	15
Joanna Bodak	Individual	9.400; 9.300	9.325; 9.450	9.325; 9.450	9.400; 9.550	37.450	9 Q	18.725	56.475	7

== Judo ==
Men

Athlete	Event	Preliminary	Round of 32	Round of 16	Quarterfinals	Semifinals	Repechage 1	Repechage 2	Repechage 3	Repechage Final	Final / BM	
Athlete	Event	Opposition Result	Opposition Result	Opposition Result	Opposition Result	Opposition Result	Opposition Result	Opposition Result	Opposition Result	Opposition Result	Opposition Result	Rank
Piotr Kamrowski	−60 kg	Charbel Chrabie (LIB); W 1000-0000	Youssef Omar Isahak (DJI); W 1000-0000	Shigueto Yamasaki (BRA); W 1000-0000	Yoon Hyun (KOR); L 0000–0001	Did not advance	BYE		Willis García (VEN); L 0000–0010	Did not advance		
Wieslaw Blach	−71 kg	BYE	Ignacio Sayu (CUB); W 1000–0000	Yong I Park (PRK); W 1000–0001	Toshihiko Koga (JPN); L 0000–0001	Did not advance	BYE	Chengsheng Shi (CHN); W 0001–0000	BYE	Toshihiko Koga (FRA); L 0000–0101	Did not advance	7
Krzysztof Kamiński	−78 kg	BYE	John Baylon (PHI); W 1000–0000	Alexandru Ciupe (ROM); L 0000–1000	Did not advance							
Waldemar Legień	−86 kg	BYE	Michael Oduor (KEN); W 1000–0000	Nikola Ivanov (BUL); W 1000–0000	Yang Jong-Ok (KOR); W 0001–0000	Nicolas Gill (CAN); W 0001–0000	BYE		—N/a	BYE	Pascal Tayot (FRA); W 0001–0000	Gold medal
Paweł Nastula	−95 kg	BYE	Yun Sang-Sik (KOR); W 1o00–0000	Robert Van De Walle (BEL); W 1000–0000	Baljinnyam Odvogiin (MGL); W 1000–0000	Raymond Stevens (GBR); L 0001–0000	BYE		—N/a	BYE	Dmitri Sergeyev (EUN); L 0100–0000	5
Rafał Kubacki	+95 kg	—N/a	Orlando Baccino Granja (ARG); W 1000–0000	Cornelis Raven (NED); W 1000–0000	David Khakhaleishvili (EUN); L 0010–0000	Did not advance	BYE	Frank Esteban Moreno Garcia (CUB); L 1000–0000	Did not advance			

Women

Athlete	Event	Round of 32	Round of 16	Quarterfinals	Semifinals	Repechage 1	Repechage 2	Repechage Final	Final / BM	
Athlete	Event	Opposition Result	Opposition Result	Opposition Result	Opposition Result	Opposition Result	Opposition Result	Opposition Result	Opposition Result	Rank
Malgorzata Roszkowska	−48 kg	BYE	Yolanda Soler (ESP); L 0000-0010	Did not advance						
Maria Gontowicz-Szalas	−56 kg	BYE	Driulys González (CUB); L 0000–0001	Did not advance		Jemina Alves (BRA); W 1000–0000	Ursula Myren (SWE); W 0010–0000	Chiyori Tateno (JPN); L 0000–0010	Did not advance	7
Boguslawa Olechnowicz	−61 kg	Diane Bell (GBR); W 0010–0000	Did not advance							
Katarzyna Juszczak	−72 kg	BYE	María Cangá (ECU); W 1000–0000	Kim Mi-Jeon (KOR); L 0000–1000	Did not advance	BYE	Alison Webb (CAN); W 0101–0000	Regina Schuttenhelm (GER); L 0001–0000	Did not advance	7
Beata Maksymow	+72 kg	Anne Akerblom (FIN); W 0001–0000	Estela Rodriguez Villanueva (CUB); L 0000–0001	Did not advance		BYE	Supatra Yompakdee (THA); W 1000–0000	Swietlana Gundarenko (EUN); W 0010–0001	Yoko Sakaue (JPN); L 0000–1000	5

== Modern pentathlon ==
Three male pentathletes represented Poland in 1992. They won gold in the team event and Arkadiusz Skrzypaszek won an individual gold too.

Athlete	Event	Shooting (10 m air pistol)	Fencing (épée one touch)	Swimming (200 m freestyle)	Riding (show jumping)	Running (3000 m)	Total points	Final rank
Athlete	Event	Points	Points	Points	Points	Points	Total points	Final rank
Maciej Czyżowicz	Men's	779	1272	1105	1087	962	5205	19
Dariusz Goździak	Men's	796	1108	1195	1135	1020	5254	10
Arkadiusz Skrzypaszek	Men's	1000	1252	1120	1147	1040	5559	Gold medal
Dariusz Goździak; Maciej Czyżowicz; Arkadiusz Skrzypaszek	Team	2575	3632	3420	3369	3022	16018	Gold medal

== Rowing ==
Men

Athlete	Event	Heats		Repechage		Semifinals C-D		Semifinals		Final	
Athlete	Event	Time	Rank	Time	Rank	Time	Rank	Time	Rank	Time	Rank
Kajetan Broniewski	Single sculls	7:11.01	2 R	7:01.64	1 Q	—N/a		7:02.65	3 Q	6:56.82	Bronze medal
Andrzej Marszałek; Andrzej Krzepińśki	Coxless pair	6:33.51	3 R	6:41.27	1 Q	—N/a		6:19.98	3 Q	6:24.32	5
Piotr Basta; Tomasz Mruczkowski; Bartosz Sroga	Coxed pair	7:02.12	1 Q	BYE		—N/a		6:53.97	4 FB	7:04.37	7
Marek Gawkowski; Piotr Bujnarowski; Cezary Jędrzycki; Jarosław Janowski	Quadruple sculls	5:54.13	4 R	5:59.03	3 Q	—N/a		6:05.31	5 FB	6:01.18	11
Jacek Streich; Wojciech Jankowski; Tomasz Tomiak; Maciej Łasicki; Michał Cieślak	Coxed four	6:27.24	5 R	6:16.93	2 Q	—N/a				6:03.27	Bronze medal

== Sailing ==
Men

Athlete	Event	Race										Net points	Final rank
Athlete	Event	1	2	3	4	5	6	7	8	9	10	Net points	Final rank
Piotr Olewiński	Lechner A-390	30	28	23	~~PMS~~	25	PMS	23	21	15	12	276.0	28
Marek Chocian; Zdzislaw Staniul	470	17	15	15	24	20	~~PMS~~	17	—N/a			144.0	21

Women

Athlete	Event	Race										Net points	Final rank
Athlete	Event	1	2	3	4	5	6	7	8	9	10	Net points	Final rank
Joanna Burzynska	Lechner A-390	10	8	9	~~DSQ~~	10	6	11	11	7	2	122.7	9

== Shooting ==
Men

Athlete	Event	Qualification		Semifinal		Final	
Athlete	Event	Score	Rank	Score	Rank	Score	Rank
Tadeusz Czerwiński	Men's 50 metre rifle three positions	1160	14	—N/a		Did not advance	
Tadeusz Czerwiński	Men's 50 metre rifle prone	594	14	—N/a		Did not advance	
Pawel Hadrych	10 m air pistol	573	29	—N/a		Did not advance	
Jacek Kubka	Men's 50 metre rifle three positions	1145	35	—N/a		Did not advance	
Jacek Kubka	Men's 50 metre rifle prone	588	43	—N/a		Did not advance	
Adam Kaczmarek	25 m rapid fire pistol	591	2 Q	778	7	Did not advance	
Robert Kraskowski	10 m air rifle	588	13	—N/a		Did not advance	
Krzysztof Kucharczyk	25 m rapid fire pistol	591	3 Q	783	4	880	4
Jerzy Pietrzak	50 m pistol	560	9	—N/a		Did not advance	
Jerzy Pietrzak	10 m air pistol	582	7	—N/a		680.1	6

Women

Athlete	Event	Qualification		Final	
Athlete	Event	Score	Rank	Score	Rank
Malgorzata Książkiewicz	Women's 50 metre rifle three positions	585	2 Q	681.5	Bronze medal
Malgorzata Książkiewicz	Women's 10 metre air rifle	388	23	Did not advance	
Julita Macur	25 m pistol	578	7 Q	674	8
Julita Macur	10 m air pistol	371	39	Did not advance	
Renata Mauer	Women's 50 metre rifle three positions	577	14	Did not advance	
Renata Mauer	Women's 10 metre air rifle	389	17	Did not advance	
Mirosława Sagun	10 m air pistol	381	7 Q	477.8	8

Open

Athlete	Event	Qualification		Semifinal		Final	
Athlete	Event	Score	Rank	Score	Rank	Score	Rank
Dorota Chytrowska-Mika	Skeet	145	25	Did not advance			

== Swimming ==
Men

Athlete	Event	Heat		Final B		Final	
Athlete	Event	Time	Rank	Time	Rank	Time	Rank
Piotr Albiński	1500 m freestyle	15:23.01	9	—N/a		Did not advance	
Krzysztof Cwalina	50 m freestyle	23.20	18	Did not advance			
Krzysztof Cwalina	100 m freestyle	51.70	35	Did not advance			
Konrad Gałka	100 m butterfly	58.86	55	Did not advance			
Konrad Gałka	200 m butterfly	2:01.33	18	Did not advance			
Igor Łuczak	200 m medley	2:07.08	29	Did not advance			
Igor Łuczak	400 m medley	2:05.32	20	Did not advance			
Marcin Maliński	200 m medley	4:28.60	20	Did not advance			
Marcin Maliński	400 m medley	4:24.72	15 q	4:22.59	14	Did not advance	
Mariusz Podkościelny	400 m freestyle	3:52.07	11 q	3:54.56	15	Did not advance	
Mariusz Podkościelny	1500 m freestyle	15:25.42	10	—N/a		Did not advance	
Rafał Szukała	100 m butterfly	53.60	1 Q	Did not advance		53.35	Silver medal
Rafał Szukała	200 m butterfly	1:59.51	3 Q	Did not advance		1:58.89	4
Artur Wojdat	200 m freestyle	1:48.60	7 Q	Did not advance		1:48.24	4
Artur Wojdat	400 m freestyle	3:51.66	8 Q	Did not advance		3:48.10	4
Mariusz Podkościelny; Artur Wojdat; Piotr Albiński; Krzysztof Cwalina	4 × 200 m freestyle	7:29.59	13	—N/a		Did not advance	

Women

Athlete	Event	Heat		Final B		Final	
Athlete	Event	Time	Rank	Time	Rank	Time	Rank
Małgorzata Galwas	100 m backstroke	1:05.36	29	Did not advance			
Małgorzata Galwas	200 m backstroke	2:17.73	26	Did not advance			
Magdalena Kupiec	100 m breaststroke	1:10.90	11 q	1:10.32	10	Did not advance	
Magdalena Kupiec	200 m breaststroke	2:33.92	16 q	2:35.74	15	Did not advance	
Alicja Pęczak	100 m breaststroke	1:10.60	9 q	1:10.73	11	Did not advance	
Alicja Pęczak	200 m breaststroke	2:30.78	8 Q	Did not advance		2:31.76	8
Ewa Synowska	200 m butterfly	2:14.58	11 q	2:13.61	11	Did not advance	
Ewa Synowska	200 m medley	2:16.88	6 Q	Did not advance		2:18.85	8
Ewa Synowska	400 m medley	4:46.00	4 Q	Did not advance		4:53.32	8
Anna Uryniuk	100 m butterfly	1:02.50	22	Did not advance			
Anna Uryniuk	200 m butterfly	2:14.91	12 q	2:14.44	12	Did not advance	
Marta Włodkowska	200 m backstroke	2:22.86	38	Did not advance			
Marta Włodkowska	400 m medley	4:58.30	24	Did not advance			

== Table tennis ==
Athlete	Event	Group stage				Round of 16	Quarterfinals	Semifinals	Final	
Athlete	Event	Opposition Result	Opposition Result	Opposition Result	Rank	Opposition Result	Opposition Result	Opposition Result	Opposition Result	Rank
Andrzej Grubba	Men's singles	Louis Botha (RSA); W 2-0	Roland Vími (TCH); W 2-0	Cláudio Kano (BRA); W 2-1	1 Q	Wang Tao (CHN); L 0-3	Did not advance			
Piotr Skierski	Men's singles	Petr Korbel (TCH); L 1-2	Ma Wenge (CHN); L 0-2	Augusto Morales (CHI); W 2-0	3	Did not advance				
Andrzej Grubba; Leszek Kucharski	Men's doubles	Atanda Ganiyu; Sule Olaleye (NGR); W 2-0	Hagen John Bower; Peter Jackson (NZL); W 2-0	Damien Éloi; Jean-Philippe Gatien (FRA); L 1-2	2	—N/a	Did not advance			

== Tennis ==
Women

Athlete	Event	Round of 64	Round of 32	Round of 16	Quarterfinals	Semifinals	Final / BM	
Athlete	Event	Opposition Score	Opposition Score	Opposition Score	Opposition Score	Opposition Score	Opposition Score	Rank
Katarzyna Nowak	Singles	Julie Halard (FRA); L 4–6, 6–7	Did not advance					
Magdalena Mróz; Katarzyna Teodorowicz	Doubles	Mercedes Paz; Patricia Tarabini (ARG); L 6–4, 4–6, 3–6	Did not advance					

== Weightlifting ==
Men

Athlete	Event	Snatch		Clean & jerk		Total	Rank
Athlete	Event	Result	Rank	Result	Rank	Total	Rank
Marek Gorzelniak	56 kg	115,0	5	140	6	255,0	8
Andrzej Kozłowski	75 kg	160	2	192,5	4	352,5	4
Włodzimierz Chlebosz	75 kg	155	3	185	8	340	7
Krzysztof Siemion	82.5 kg	165	3	205	1	370	Silver medal
Andrzej Cofalik	82.5 kg	160	6	190	11	350	10
Sergiusz Wolczaniecki	90 kg	172,5	3	220	3	392,5	Bronze medal
Waldemar Malak	100 kg	185	2	215	4	400	Bronze medal
Dariusz Osuch	110 kg	175	6	225,5	4	397,5	5
Piotr Banaszak	110 kg	185	5	0	DNF	185	AC

== Wrestling ==
Men's freestyle

Athlete	Event	Elimination Pool							Final round	
Athlete	Event	Round 1 Result	Round 2 Result	Round 3 Result	Round 4 Result	Round 5 Result	Round 6 Result	Rank	Final round Result	Rank
Stanisław Szostecki	−48 kg	Fariborz Besarati (SWE); W 7-3	Reiner Heugabel (GER); L 0-9	Vugar Orujov (EUN); L 0-12	—N/a			7	Did not advance	
Dariusz Grzywiński	−62 kg	Anibál Nieves (PUR); L 2-3	Eduards Žukovs (LAT); W 4-2	Rosen Vasilev (BUL); L 4-5	—N/a			7	Did not advance	
Krzysztof Walencik	−74 kg	Constantinos Eliadis (CYP); W 8-0	Magomedsalam Gadzhiev (EUN); L 3-4	Milan Revický (TCH); W 1-0	Lodoin Enkhbayar (MGL); W 8-3	Kenny Monday (USA); L 0-2	—N/a	3	Gary Holmes (CAN); W	5
Robert Kostecki	−82 kg	Rasoul Khadem (IRI); L 0-9	Kevin Jackson (USA); L 3-4	—N/a				8	Did not advance	
Marek Garmulewicz	−90 kg	Daniel Sánchez (PUR); W 16-1	Gábor Tóth (HUN); L 4-5	Kenan Şimşek (TUR); L 1-4	—N/a			4	Renato Lombardo (ITA); W 0-0	7
Andrzej Radomski	−100 kg	Boldyn Javkhlantögs (MGL); W 8-0	Alioune Diouf (SEN); W 6-3	Magdiel Gutiérrez (NCA); W 7-0	Ali Kayalı (TUR); L 3-5	Leri Khabelov (EUN); L 0-5	—N/a	3	Subhash Verma (IND); W 2-0	5
Tomasz Kupis	−130 kg	Mahmut Demir (TUR); L 1-4	Jeffrey Thue (CAN); L 0-6	—N/a				7	Did not advance	

Men's Greco-Roman

Athlete	Event	Elimination Pool							Final round	
Athlete	Event	Round 1 Result	Round 2 Result	Round 3 Result	Round 4 Result	Round 5 Result	Round 6 Result	Rank	Final round Result	Rank
Włodzimierz Zawadzki	−62 kg	Shigeki Nishiguchi (JPN); W 3-1	Hu Guohong (CHN); W 4-0	Sergey Martynov (EUN); L 8-9	BYE	—N/a	Hugo Dietsche (SUI); W 7-0	2	Juan Marén (CUB); L 0-5	4
Ryszard Wolny	−68 kg	Takumi Mori (JPN); W 1-0	Martin Kornbakk (SWE); W 3-1	Cecilio Rodríguez (CUB); L 1-6	Islam Dugushiev (EUN); L 1-5	—N/a		4	Doug Yeats (CAN); W 1-0	7
Józef Tracz	−74 kg	Željko Trajković (IOP); W 2-0	Tuomo Karila (FIN); W 2-1	Jaroslav Zeman (TCH); W 5-4	Erhan Balcı (TUR); W 5-1	Anton Marchl (AUT); W 5-0	Torbjörn Kornbakk (SWE); W 3-0	1	Mnatsakan Iskandaryan (EUN); L 3-6	Silver medal
Piotr Stępień	−82 kg	Ernesto Razzino (ITA); W 6-0	Daulet Turlykhanov (EUN); W 3-2	David Martinetti (SUI); W 7-1	BYE	Timo Niemi (FIN); W 3-0	—N/a	1	Péter Farkas (HUN); L 1-6	Silver medal
Andrzej Wroński	−100 kg	Dennis Koslowski (USA); L 0-2	Stipe Damjanović (CRO); W 6-0	Helger Hallik (EST); W 2-0	Song Sung-il (KOR); W 4-3	Ion Ieremciuc (ROU); W 0-0	—N/a	2	Sergey Demyashkevich (EUN); L 0-1	4
Jerzy Choromański	−130 kg	Panagiotis Poikilidis (GRE); L 0-2	Tian Lei (CHN); L 2-6	—N/a				5	Milan Radaković (IOP); W 4-2	9
