= Štěch =

Štěch and Štech (feminines: Štěchová, Štechová) are Czech and Slovak surnames, which were derived from the Czech given name Štěpán and Slovak given name Štefan, both variants of Stephen. Notable people with the surname include:

- Andrzej Stech (1635–1697), Polish painter
- Juraj Štěch (born 1968), Slovak wrestler
- Karel Štěch (1908–1982), Czech artist
- Marek Štěch (born 1990), Czech footballer
- Milan Štěch (born 1953), Czech politician
- Stanislav Štech (born 1954), Czech politician
