= Elvia Reyes =

Honduran fencer

Personal information
- Full name: Elvia Obdulia Reyes Zúñiga
- Born: 12 June 1956 (age 70)

Sport
- Sport: Fencing

Elvia Obdulia Reyes Zúñiga (born 12 June 1956) is a Honduran fencer. She was selected to compete for Honduras at the 1992 Summer Olympics in the women's foil event. During the first round, she lost all of her bouts against six other competitors and was eliminated from contention to win a medal. In the same year, she was awarded a Diploma for Action by the International Fair Play Committee.

== Biography ==
Elvia Obdulia Reyes Zúñiga was born on 12 June 1956. As a fencer, she represented Honduras in international competition.

Before she competed at the 1992 Summer Games, Reyes married sports teacher Maylo Núñez, who focuses teaching sports to disabled children with the Love in Action foundation. Reyes had two children with him, Sofía Alejandra and Elvia María.

Reyes was selected to compete for Honduras at the 1992 Summer Olympics held in Barcelona, Spain. At the 1992 Summer Games, she was entered in one event, the women's foil held at the Palau de la Metal·lúrgia. She competed in the first round on 30 July 1992 in Pool Five against six other competitors, namely: Rosa María Castillejo, E Jie, Sandra Giancola, Reka Zsofia Lazăr-Szabo, Gertrúd Stefanek, and Giovanna Trillini. There, Reyes lost all of her bouts and placed last in her pool, failing to advance to the elimination rounds of the event.

After the Summer Games, she worked as a fencing coach at the Gimnasio Rubén C. Valentine in Tegucigalpa. In 1992, during an Olympic Day race held in Honduras, she had been leading the race but decided to assist a half-blind participant who had lost his escort in order for him to complete the race. Due to her actions, she was awarded a Diploma for Action by the International Fair Play Committee.
