= Mawby =

Mawby is a surname. Notable people with the surname include:

- Colin Mawby (1936–2019), English organist, choral conductor and composer
- Maurice Mawby (1904–1977), Australian mining industry leader
- Ray Mawby (1922–1990), British politician
- Russell Mawby (1928–2017), American academic and philanthropist
- Sarah Mawby (born 1965), British fencer

== See also ==
- Mawbyite, a mineral
- The Mawby Triplets, three English sisters who were child actors
- Demi Rose (born 1995), British model
