= Wang Chunguang =

Chinese wrestler

Personal information
- Nationality: Chinese
- Born: 15 January 1967 (age 59)

Sport
- Sport: Wrestling

Wang Chunguang (born 15 January 1967, Chinese: 王春光; pinyin: Wáng Chūnguāng) is a Chinese wrestler. He competed in the men's freestyle 130 kg at the 1992 Summer Olympics.
