= Kiril Barbutov =

Bulgarian wrestler

Personal information
- Nationality: Bulgarian
- Born: 13 June 1967 (age 59) Petrich, Bulgaria

Sport
- Sport: freestyle wrestling, sambo
Medal record
Men's Sambo
World Sambo Championships
Bronze medal – third place	1992 Herne Bay	+100 kg
Men's freestyle wrestling
Goodwill Games
Bronze medal – third place	1990 Seattle	+100 kg
European Wrestling Championships
Bronze medal – third place	1989 Ankara	+100 kg
Silver medal – second place	1990 Poznan	+100 kg
Bronze medal – third place	1992 Kaposvár	+100 kg

Kiril Georgiev Barbutov (born 13 June 1967) is a Bulgarian wrestler. He competed in the men's freestyle 130 kg at the 1992 Summer Olympics.
