= Wrestling at the 1992 Summer Olympics – Men's freestyle 130 kg =

Men's freestyle 130 kg at the Games of the XXV Olympiad
- Venue: Institut Nacional d'Educació Física de Catalunya
- Dates: 4–6 August 1992
- Competitors: 15 from 15 nations

Medalists
1st place, gold medalist(s)		Bruce Baumgartner	United States
2nd place, silver medalist(s)		Jeff Thue	Canada
3rd place, bronze medalist(s)		David Gobejishvili	Unified Team

The men's freestyle 130 kilograms at the 1992 Summer Olympics as part of the wrestling program were held at the Institut Nacional d'Educació Física de Catalunya from August 4 to August 6. The wrestlers were divided into two groups, with the winner of each group decided by a double-elimination system.

== Results ==
Legend

- WO — Won by walkover

=== Elimination A ===
==== Round 1 ====
	Score		CP
Rodney Figueroa (PUR)	0–3	Park Sung-ha (KOR)	0–3 PO
Tamon Honda (JPN)	0–3 Fall	Alireza Soleimani (IRI)	0–4 TO
Mor Wade (SEN)	0–4 Fall	Jeff Thue (CAN)	0–4 TO
Mahmut Demir (TUR)	4–1	Tomasz Kupis (POL)	3–1 PP

==== Round 2 ====
	Score		CP
Rodney Figueroa (PUR)	3–2	Tamon Honda (JPN)	3–1 PP
Park Sung-ha (KOR)	0–5 Fall	Alireza Soleimani (IRI)	0–4 TO
Mor Wade (SEN)	0–3 Fall	Mahmut Demir (TUR)	0–4 TO
Jeff Thue (CAN)	6–0	Tomasz Kupis (POL)	3–0 PO

==== Round 3 ====
	Score		CP
Rodney Figueroa (PUR)	0–3 Fall	Alireza Soleimani (IRI)	0–4 TO
Park Sung-ha (KOR)	0–5	Jeff Thue (CAN)	0–3 PO
Mahmut Demir (TUR)		Bye	

==== Round 4 ====
	Score		CP
Mahmut Demir (TUR)	2–1	Alireza Soleimani (IRI)	3–1 PP
Jeff Thue (CAN)		Bye	

==== Round 5 ====
	Score		CP
Jeff Thue (CAN)	1–0	Mahmut Demir (TUR)	3–0 PO
Alireza Soleimani (IRI)		Bye	

==== Round 6 ====
	Score		CP
Alireza Soleimani (IRI)	0–0	Jeff Thue (CAN)	0–0 D2
Mahmut Demir (TUR)		Bye	

==== Summary ====
Pos	Athlete	Pld	W	L	R	CP	TP
1	Jeff Thue (CAN)	5	4	1	X (Note: Classification points: CAN 3, TUR 3, IRI 1; CAN 3–0 TUR)	13	16
2	Mahmut Demir (TUR)	4	3	1	X	10	9
3	Alireza Soleimani (IRI)	5	3	2	X	13	12
4	Park Sung-ha (KOR)	3	1	2	3	3	3
5	Rodney Figueroa (PUR)	3	1	2	3	3	3
—	Tamon Honda (JPN)	2	0	2	2	1	2
—	Tomasz Kupis (POL)	2	0	2	2	1	1
—	Mor Wade (SEN)	2	0	2	2	0	0

Source: Official Report

=== Elimination B ===
==== Round 1 ====
	Score		CP
Juraj Štěch (TCH)	3–6	David Gobejishvili (EUN)	1–3 PP
Kiril Barbutov (BUL)	1–9	Bruce Baumgartner (USA)	1–3 PP
Zsolt Gombos (HUN)	0–4	Andreas Schröder (GER)	0–3 PO
Wang Chunguang (CHN)		Bye	

==== Round 2 ====
	Score		CP
Wang Chunguang (CHN)	9–1 Fall	Juraj Štěch (TCH)	4–0 TO
David Gobejishvili (EUN)	7–1	Kiril Barbutov (BUL)	3–1 PP
Bruce Baumgartner (USA)	8–0	Zsolt Gombos (HUN)	3–0 PO
Andreas Schröder (GER)		Bye	

==== Round 3 ====
	Score		CP
Andreas Schröder (GER)	3–0 Fall	Wang Chunguang (CHN)	4–0 TO
David Gobejishvili (EUN)	0–3	Bruce Baumgartner (USA)	0–3 PO

==== Round 4 ====
	Score		CP
Andreas Schröder (GER)	3–4	David Gobejishvili (EUN)	1–3 PP
Wang Chunguang (CHN)	0–5 Fall	Bruce Baumgartner (USA)	0–4 TO

==== Round 5 ====
	Score		CP
Andreas Schröder (GER)	0–7	Bruce Baumgartner (USA)	0–3 PO
David Gobejishvili (EUN)		Bye	

==== Summary ====
Pos	Athlete	Pld	W	L	R	CP	TP
1	Bruce Baumgartner (USA)	5	5	0	X (Note: Classification points: USA 6, EUN 3, GER 1)	16	32
2	David Gobejishvili (EUN)	4	3	1	X	9	17
3	Andreas Schröder (GER)	4	2	2	X	8	10
4	Wang Chunguang (CHN)	3	1	2	4	4	9
5	Kiril Barbutov (BUL)	2	0	2	2	2	2
—	Juraj Štěch (TCH)	2	0	2	2	1	4
—	Zsolt Gombos (HUN)	2	0	2	2	0	0

Source: Official Report

=== Finals ===
	Score		CP
9th place match
Rodney Figueroa (PUR)	0–11	Kiril Barbutov (BUL)	0–3 PO
7th place match
Park Sung-ha (KOR)	0–9	Wang Chunguang (CHN)	0–3 PO
5th place match
Alireza Soleimani (IRI)	WO	Andreas Schröder (GER)	
Bronze medal match
Mahmut Demir (TUR)	0–4	David Gobejishvili (EUN)	0–3 PO
Gold medal match
Jeff Thue (CAN)	0–8	Bruce Baumgartner (USA)	0–3 PO

== Final standing ==
Rank	Athlete
1st place, gold medalist(s)	Bruce Baumgartner (USA)
2nd place, silver medalist(s)	Jeff Thue (CAN)
3rd place, bronze medalist(s)	David Gobejishvili (EUN)
4	Mahmut Demir (TUR)
5	Andreas Schröder (GER)
6	Alireza Soleimani (IRI)
7	Wang Chunguang (CHN)
8	Park Sung-ha (KOR)
9	Kiril Barbutov (BUL)
10	Rodney Figueroa (PUR)
