= Park Seong-ha =

South Korean wrestler

Personal information
- Nationality: South Korean
- Born: 17 April 1966 (age 60)

Sport
- Sport: Wrestling

Park Seong-ha (born 17 April 1966) is a South Korean wrestler. He competed in the men's freestyle 130 kg at the 1992 Summer Olympics.
