= Mor Wade =

Senegalese wrestler

Personal information
- Nationality: Senegalese
- Born: 15 March 1957
- Died: 18 June 2019 (aged 62)

Sport
- Sport: Wrestling

Mor Wade (15 March 1957 – 18 June 2019) was a Senegalese wrestler. He competed in the men's freestyle 130 kg at the 1992 Summer Olympics.
