= Rodney Figueroa =

Puerto Rican wrestler

- Weight: 63 kg (139 lb)
- Born: 13 July 1966 (age 60)
- Olympic team: PUR

Rodney Figueroa (born 13 July 1966) is a Puerto Rican wrestler. He competed in the men's freestyle 130 kg at the 1992 Summer Olympics.

He currently serves as the District Administrator for the School District of Monroe, in Monroe, Wisconsin.
