= Roxana Dumitrescu =

Romanian fencer (born 1967)

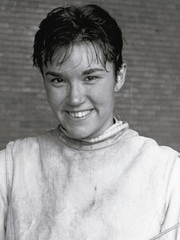

Personal information
- Born: 27 June 1967 (age 59) Urziceni, Romania

Sport
- Sport: Fencing
- Event: Foil
- Club: CSA Steaua București
Medal record
Representing Romania
Olympic Games
Bronze medal – third place	1992 Barcelona	Foil, team

Roxana Daniela Dumitrescu (later Toader, born 27 June 1967) is a retired Romanian foil fencer who won a team bronze medal at the 1992 Olympics.
