= Heidi Botha =

South African fencer

Personal information
- Born: 7 November 1968 (age 57)

Sport
- Sport: Fencing

Heidi Botha (born 7 November 1968) is a South African fencer. She competed in the women's individual foil event at the 1992 Summer Olympics.
