= Rencia Nasson =

South African fencer

Personal information
- Born: 7 August 1965 (age 60)

Sport
- Sport: Fencing

Rencia Nasson (born 7 August 1965) is a South African fencer. She competed in the women's individual foil event at the 1992 Summer Olympics.
