= Andrzej Stech =

German painter

Andreas Stech
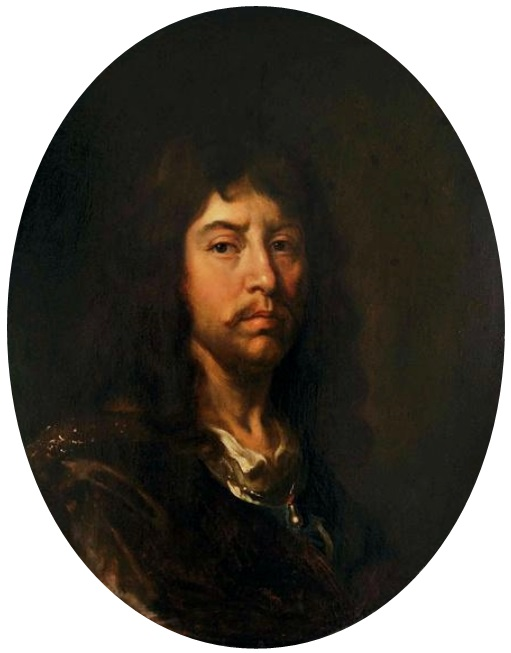
- Self-portrait. circa 1675
- Born: Andreas Stech; 9 September 1635; Stolp, Duchy of Pomerania, Holy Roman Empire (modern Słupsk, Poland)
- Died: 12 January 1697 (aged 61); Danzig, (Gdańsk)
- Known for: Painting
- Movement: Baroque
- Spouse: Adelgunde Wulf

Andreas Stech (9 September 1635 – 12 January 1697) was a Baroque painter.

Stech was born in Stolp (Słupsk), the son of Heinrich Stech a painter from Lübeck. He was of Lutheran faith. In 1636, together with his family he moved to Danzig (Gdańsk). It is most likely that he was taught by his father; from 1653, by his father-in-law Adolf Boy (1612–1683). In 1658, he married the widow of the painter August Ranisch. After the death of his first wife, he married Adelgunde, the daughter of Nicias Wulf. He had five children from his first marriage, and four from his second. In 1662, he became the Master Artisan on the basis of his artwork: The Calling of St. Andrew and Croesus throwing himself in the fire. In 1667, he received Danzig citizenship. In 1673, he became a juror. From 1677, he worked for King John III Sobieski of the Polish–Lithuanian Commonwealth. His brother was also a painter.

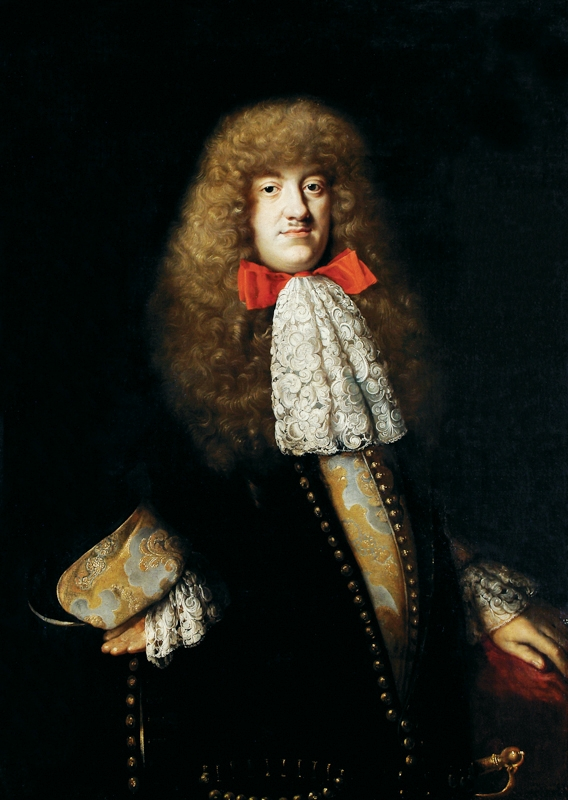
Portrait of Heinrich Schwarzwaldt
(1682)

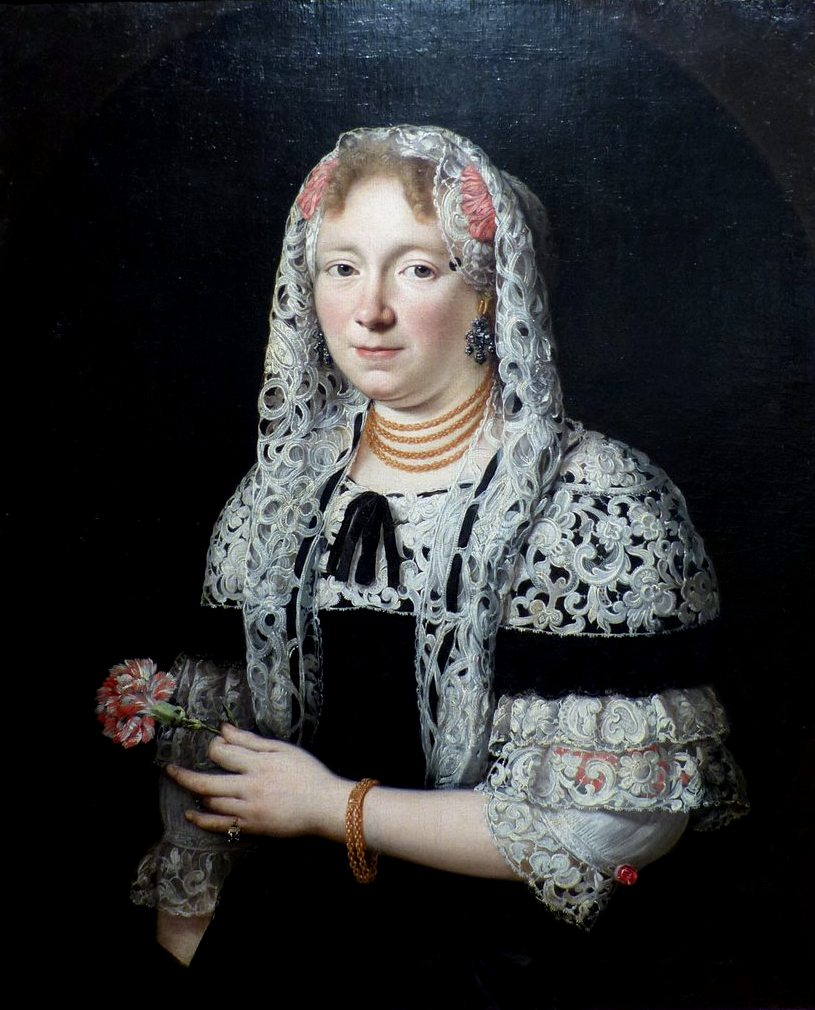
Portrait of a Patrician Lady from Danzig
(1685)

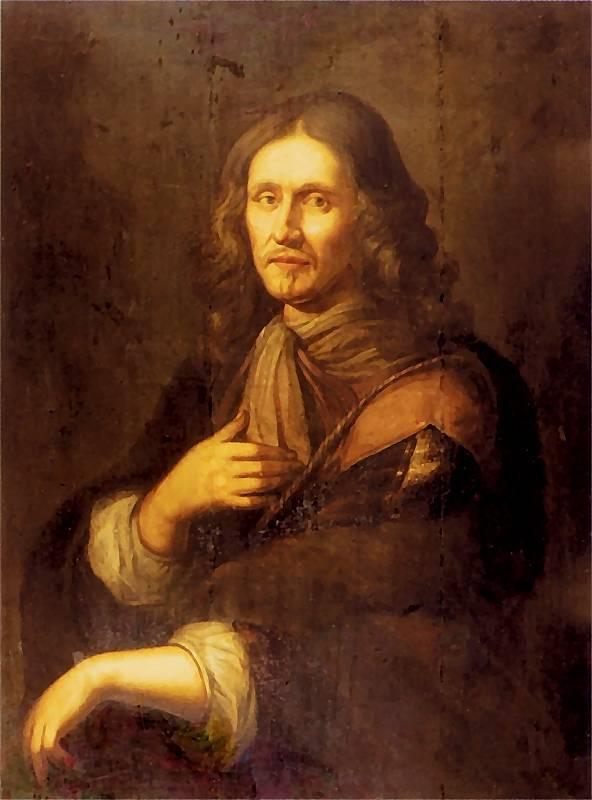
Portrait of a townsman from Danzig
(1675)

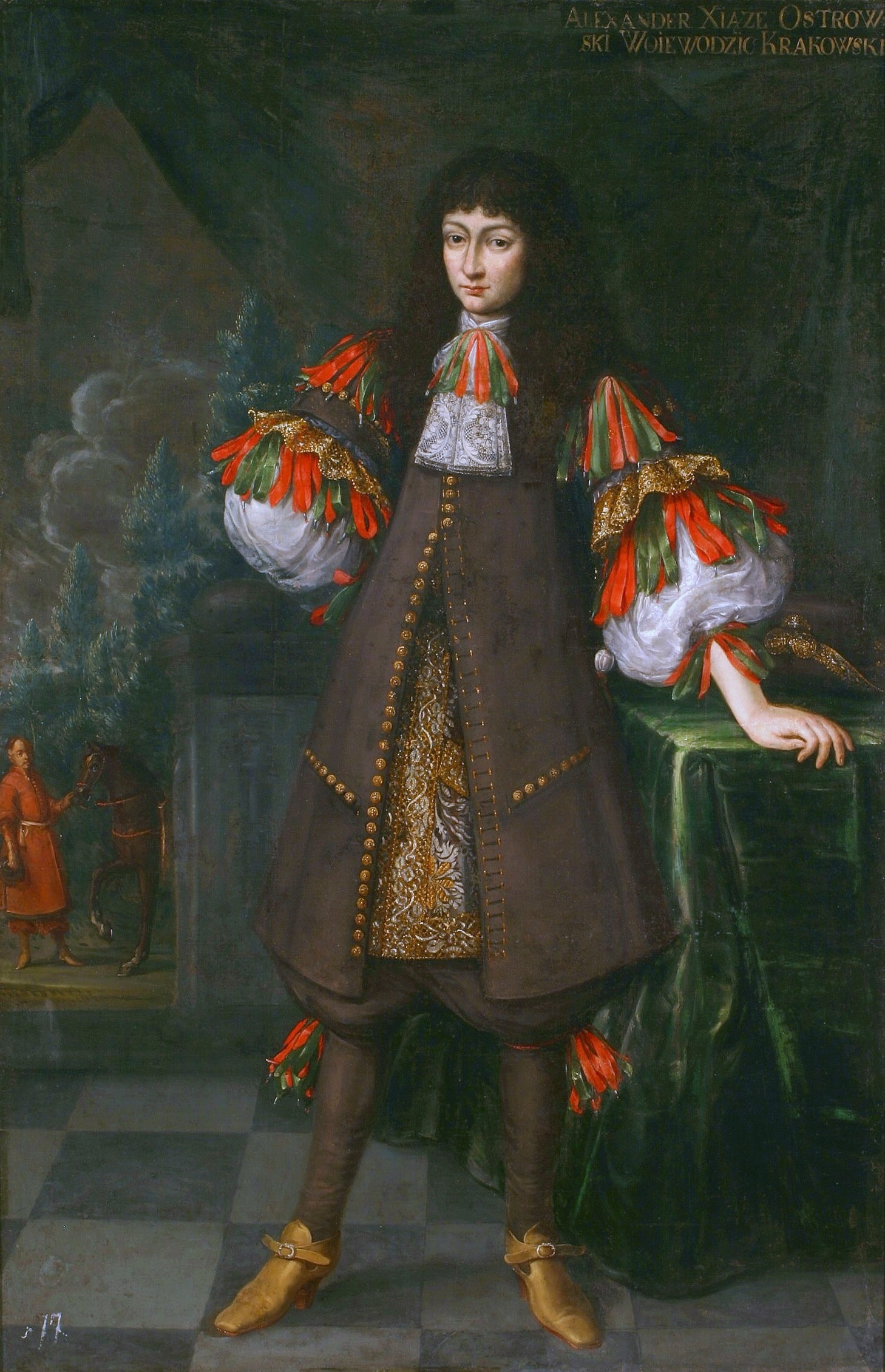
Portrait of Zasławski-Ostrogski
(1670)
