= Tomoko Oka =

Japanese fencer (born 1964)

Personal information
- Born: 27 October 1964 (age 61)

Sport
- Sport: Fencing

Tomoko Oka (岡 智子, Oka Tomoko) (born 27 October 1964) is a Japanese fencer. She competed in the women's foil events at the 1984 and 1988 Summer Olympics.
