= Marek Chocian =

Polish sailor (born 1965)

Personal information
- Nationality: Polish
- Born: 24 November 1965 (age 59); Giżycko, Poland

Sport
- Sport: Sailing

Marek Chocian (born 24 November 1965) is a Polish sailor. He competed at the 1992 Summer Olympics and the 1996 Summer Olympics.
