= Camille Couzi =

French fencer

Personal information
- Born: 21 August 1971 (age 54) Gradignan, France

Sport
- Sport: Fencing

Camille Couzi (born 21 August 1971) is a French fencer. She competed in the women's team foil event at the 1992 Summer Olympics.
