= Sun Hongyun =

Chinese fencer (born 1962)

Personal information
- Born: 5 March 1962 (age 64)

Sport
- Sport: Fencing

Sun Hongyun (born 5 March 1962) is a Chinese fencer. She competed in the women's individual and team foil events at the 1988 Summer Olympics.
