= Park Eun-hui =

South Korean fencer

Personal information
- Born: 1 June 1970 (age 56) South Korea

Sport
- Sport: Fencing

- Park Eun-hui
- Hangul: 박은희
- RR: Bak Eunhui
- MR: Pak Ŭnhŭi

Park Eun-hui (born 1 June 1970) is a South Korean fencer. She competed in the women's individual and team foil events at the 1988 Summer Olympics.
