= Alessandra Mariéthoz =

Swiss fencer

Personal information
- Born: 6 April 1967 (age 59)

Sport
- Sport: Fencing

Alessandra Mariéthoz (born 6 April 1967) is a Swiss fencer. She competed in the women's individual foil event at the 1988 Summer Olympics.
