= Jeff Thue =

Canadian wrestler (born 1969)

Personal information
- Born: January 25, 1969 (age 57) Regina, Saskatchewan, Canada

Professional wrestling career
- Sport: Amateur wrestling
- Event: Freestyle
Medal record
Men's freestyle wrestling
Representing Canada
Olympic Games
Silver medal – second place	1992 Barcelona	130 kg
World Championships
Bronze medal – third place	1991 Varna	130 kg
Men's collegiate wrestling
Representing Simon Fraser
NAIA Championships
Gold medal – first place	1991 Butte	275 lb
Gold medal – first place	1992 Hays	275 lb
Gold medal – first place	1993 Butte	275 lb

Jeffrey “Jeff” Thue (born January 25, 1969) is a former Canadian freestyle wrestler. He won a silver medal in the men's freestyle 130 kg category at the 1992 Summer Olympics. Thue is a member of the Saskatchewan Sports (1997), Canadian Amateur Wrestling Association (2003), and Simon Fraser University (2012) Halls of Fame.
