= Igor Łuczak =

Polish swimmer

Personal information
- Born: 27 August 1972 (age 53) Łódź, Poland

Sport
- Sport: Swimming

Igor Łuczak (born 27 August 1972) is a Polish swimmer. He competed in two events at the 1992 Summer Olympics.
