= Jolanta Królikowska =

Polish fencer (born 1960)

Personal information
- Full name: Jolanta Hanna Królikowska
- Born: 21 May 1960 (age 66) Warsaw, Poland

Sport
- Sport: Fencing

Jolanta Hanna Królikowska (born 21 May 1960) is a Polish fencer. She competed in the women's individual and team foil events at the 1980 and 1988 Summer Olympics.
