= Agnieszka Dubrawska =

Polish fencer

Personal information
- Full name: Agnieszka Tamara Dubrawska-Żalińska
- Born: 12 December 1958 (age 67) Gdańsk, Poland
- Height: 172 cm (5 ft 8 in)

Sport
- Sport: Fencing

Agnieszka Tamara Dubrawska (née Żalińska, born 12 December 1958) is a Polish fencer. She competed at the 1980 and 1988 Summer Olympics.
