= Tomasz Kupis =

Polish wrestler

Personal information
- Nationality: Polish
- Born: 4 April 1964 (age 62) Łęczyca, Poland

Sport
- Sport: Wrestling

Tomasz Kupis (born 4 April 1964) is a Polish wrestler. He competed in the men's freestyle 130 kg at the 1992 Summer Olympics.
