= Julie-Anne Gross =

French fencer

Personal information
- Born: 27 September 1967 (age 58) Neuilly-sur-Seine, France

Sport
- Sport: Fencing

Julie-Anne Gross (born 27 September 1967) is a French fencer. She competed in the women's team foil event at the 1992 Summer Olympics.
