= Marta Włodkowska =

Polish swimmer

Personal information
- Born: 9 August 1973 (age 52) Szczecin, Poland

Sport
- Sport: Swimming

Marta Włodkowska (born 9 August 1973) is a Polish backstroke and medley swimmer. She competed in two events at the 1992 Summer Olympics.
