= Akemi Morikawa =

Japanese fencer

Personal information
- Born: 11 December 1967 (age 58)

Sport
- Sport: Fencing

Akemi Morikawa (森川 明美, Morikawa Akemi) (born 11 December 1967) is a Japanese fencer. She competed in the women's individual and team foil events at the 1988 Summer Olympics.
