= Juraj Štěch =

Slovak wrestler

Personal information
- Nationality: Slovak
- Born: 25 April 1968 (age 58) Liptovský Mikuláš, Czechoslovakia

Sport
- Sport: Wrestling

Juraj Štěch (born 25 April 1968) is a Slovak wrestler. He competed in the men's freestyle 130 kg at the 1992 Summer Olympics.
