= Madeleine Philion =

Canadian fencer (born 1963)

Personal information
- Born: February 21, 1963 (age 63) Gatineau, Quebec, Canada

Sport
- Sport: Fencing
Medal record
Representing Canada
Pan American Games
Silver medal – second place	1987 Indianapolis	Individual foil
Summer Universiade
Bronze medal – third place	1983 Edmonton	Individual foil

Madeleine Philion (born February 21, 1963) is a Canadian fencer. She competed in the women's individual and team foil events at the 1984 and 1988 Summer Olympics.
