= Dariusz Koseła =

Polish footballer

Personal information
- Full name: Dariusz Marek Koseła
- Date of birth: 12 February 1970 (age 56)
- Place of birth: Zabrze, Poland
- Height: 1.71 m (5 ft 7 1/2 in)
- Position: Midfielder

Youth career
- Pogoń Zabrze

Senior career*
Years	Team	Apps	(Gls)
1988–1998	Górnik Zabrze	241	(26)
1998–1999	Ruch Radzionków	10	(0)
2000	Rot-Weiß Fredersdorf-Vogelsdorf		
2001–2003	Ruch Radzionków	33	(2)
2004	Ruch Zdzieszowice		
2004–2006	ŁTS Łabędy		
2006–2007	Tęcza Wielowieś		

International career
- Poland Olympic
Medal record
Men's football
Representing Poland
Olympic Games
Silver medal – second place	1992 Barcelona	Team
- * Club domestic league appearances and goals

Dariusz Marek Koseła (born 12 February 1970) is a Polish former professional footballer who played as a midfielder.

== Career ==
=== National team ===
Koseła was a participant at the 1992 Summer Olympics, where Poland won the silver medal.

== Honours ==
Górnik Zabrze

- Ekstraklasa: 1987–88

Poland Olympic

- Olympic silver medal: 1992
