= Andrea Piros =

Swiss fencer

Personal information
- Born: 22 January 1966 (age 60)

Sport
- Sport: Fencing

Andrea Piros (born 22 January 1966) is a Swiss fencer. She competed in women's individual foil event at the 1988 Summer Olympics.
