= Tamara Savić-Šotra =

Serbian fencer

Personal information
- Born: 24 July 1971 (age 53)

Sport
- Sport: Fencing

Tamara Savić-Šotra (Serbian Cyrillic: Тамара Савић-Шотра; born 24 July 1971) is a Serbian fencer. She competed as an Independent Olympic Participant at the 1992 Summer Olympics and for FR Yugoslavia at the 1996 and 2000 Summer Olympics, winning one of her five bouts.

Later, she taught fencing to military officers in Serbia.
