= Karel Štěch =

Czech landscape painter, graphic designer, woodcutter, and illustrator

Karel Štěch (31 October 1908 in České Budějovice – 29 July 1982 in České Budějovice) was a Czech landscape painter, graphic designer, woodcutter and illustrator. He was popular during the Communist era of Czechoslovakia.
