= Sharon Monplaisir =

American fencer

Personal information
- Born: November 3, 1960 (age 65) New York City, New York, U.S.

Sport
- Sport: Fencing
Medal record
Representing United States
Pan American Games
Gold medal – first place	1987 Indianapolis	Team foil
Gold medal – first place	1991 Havana	Team foil

Sharon Mary Monplaisir (born November 3, 1960) is an American foil fencer. She competed at the 1984, 1988 and 1992 Summer Olympics. She was also on the gold-winning United States fencing team at the 1987 and 1991 Pan American Games, and was a four-time NCAA All-American fencer.

Monplaisir is the subject of children's non-fiction chapter book, Sword of a Champion by Doreen and Michael Greenberg, in the Anything You Can Do... series from Wish Publishing. She is also the model/subject for the exercise book, Get a Gold Medal Butt by Gary Guerriero and Mary Leonard.

== See also ==
- List of USFA Hall of Fame members
