= Montserat Esquerdo =

Spanish fencer

Personal information
- Born: 4 December 1960 (age 65) Barcelona, Spain

Sport
- Sport: Fencing

Montserat Esquerdo (born 4 December 1960) is a Spanish fencer. She competed in the women's individual foil event at the 1992 Summer Olympics.
