= Yung Yim King =

Hong Kong fencer

Personal information
- Born: 12 July 1959 (age 66)

Sport
- Sport: Fencing

Yung Yim King (born 12 July 1959) is a Hong Kong fencer. She competed in the women's individual foil event at the 1988 Summer Olympics.
