= Fabiana López =

Mexican fencer (born 1966)

Personal information
- Born: 20 January 1966 (age 60)

Sport
- Sport: Fencing

Fabiana López (born 20 January 1966) is a Mexican fencer. She competed in the women's individual foil event at the 1988 Summer Olympics.
