= Annette Dobmeier =

German fencer (born 1968)

Personal information
- Born: 10 February 1968 (age 58) Tauberbischofsheim, West Germany

Sport
- Sport: Fencing
Medal record
Women's fencing
Olympic Games
Representing Germany
Silver medal – second place	1992 Barcelona	Foil, team

Annette Dobmeier (born 10 February 1968) is a German former fencer. She won a silver medal in the women's team foil event at the 1992 Summer Olympics.
