= Wang Huifeng =

Chinese fencer (born 1968)

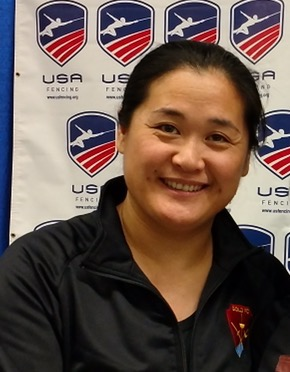
- Wang at the 2017 March North American Cup

Personal information
- Nationality: Chinese
- Born: January 24, 1968 (age 58) Tianjin, China
- Height: 1.68 m (5 ft 6 in)
- Weight: 72 kg (159 lb)

Fencing career
- Sport: Fencing
- Country: China
- Weapon: Foil
- Hand: Left-handed
- Head coach: Guogang Wen
Medal record
Women's fencing
Representing China
Olympic Games
| Silver medal – second place | 1992 Barcelona | Individual |
World Championships
| Bronze medal – third place | 1990 Lyon | Team |
Asian Games
| Gold medal – first place | 1990 Beijing | Team |
| Silver medal – second place | 1998 Bangkok | Team |
World University Games
| Silver medal – second place | 1987 Zagreb | Team |

Wang Huifeng (Chinese: 王会凤, born 24 January 1968) is a female Chinese fencer. She competed at the 1992 Barcelona Olympic Games, and won a silver medal in women's individual foil event.

Wang is currently coaching at the Gold Fencing Club in Waltham, Massachusetts. Many of her students are national finalists.

== Career ==
Wang started relatively late in her fencing career. She was fourteen years old when she started fencing. Wang competed at the 1987 World University Games and placed 2nd in the women's foil team event. She also represented China at the 1989, 1990, and 1991 World Championships, placing 6th, 3rd, and 6th respectively in women's foil team. At the 1990 Asian Games, she won gold in the women's foil team event. She went on the represent China at the 1992 Summer Olympics in Barcelona and won silver in individual women's foil. She also represented China at the 1996 Summer Olympics in Atlanta and finished 29th. She competed at the 1998 Asian Games and finished 2nd in women's foil team and 5th in individual women's foil. After competing in several national and international events for China, she moved to the U.S. and became a coach. The first club she taught at was in Las Vegas, NV at Red Rock Fencing Center. She currently coaches at Gold Fencing Club in Waltham, Massachusetts which she founded in 2013.

== Coaching career ==
Huifeng Wang has taught at Red Rock Fencing Center in Las Vegas, NV and Moe Wen Fencing Club in Somerville, MA and she currently coaches at the Gold Fencing Club in Waltham, MA (formerly known as Huifeng Wang Fencing Club) which she founded in 2013.

Wang's students have won a total of at least a dozen medals in National Championships and North American Cups in both men's and women's foil. Her students have received countless medals in local and regional tournaments, and many are national finalists and/or nationally ranked in youth, cadet, junior, and senior US national point standings.
