= Zdzisław Staniul =

Polish sailor

Personal information
- Nationality: Polish
- Born: 3 February 1965 (age 60); Węgorzewo, Poland

Sport
- Sport: Sailing

Zdzisław Staniul (born 3 February 1965) is a Polish sailor. He competed at the 1992 Summer Olympics and the 1996 Summer Olympics.
