= Claudia Grigorescu =

Romanian fencer (born 1968)

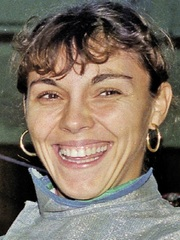

Personal information
- Born: 6 January 1968 (age 58) Bucharest, Romania

Sport
- Sport: Fencing
- Event: Foil
- Club: CSA Steaua București
Medal record
Representing Romania
Olympic Games
Bronze medal – third place	1992 Barcelona	Foil, team
World Fencing Championships
Silver medal – second place	1987 Lousanne	Foil, team
Silver medal – second place	1991 Budapest	Foil, ind.
Silver medal – second place	1993 Essen	Foil, team
Gold medal – first place	1994 Athens	Foil, team
Silver medal – second place	1995 The Hague	Foil, team
Silver medal – second place	1998 La Chaux-de-Fonds	Foil, team

Claudia Laura Grigorescu (later Vanţă, born 6 January 1968) is a retired Romanian foil fencer who won a team bronze medal at the 1992 Olympics. She also won six medals at the world championships between 1987 and 1998, including a team gold in 1994 and an individual silver in 1991.
