= Agnieszka Szuchnicka =

Polish fencer

Personal information
- Born: 11 February 1968 (age 58) Gdańsk, Poland

Sport
- Sport: Fencing

Agnieszka Szuchnicka (born 11 February 1968) is a Polish fencer. She competed in the women's team foil event at the 1992 Summer Olympics.
