= Sarah Mawby =

British fencer

Personal information
- Born: 9 April 1965 (age 61) Evanston, Illinois, United States

Sport
- Sport: Fencing

Sarah Jane Mawby (born 9 April 1965) is a British fencer. She competed in the women's team foil event at the 1992 Summer Olympics.
