= Julia Bracewell =

British fencer (born 1964)

Julia Helen Bracewell
Personal information
- Nationality: British
- Born: 26 April 1964 (age 62) Rochford, Essex, England

Sport
- Sport: Fencing

Julia Bracewell OBE (born 26 April 1964) is a British lawyer and fencer. She competed in the women's foil events at the 1992 Summer Olympics.

== Biography ==
Bracewell was born in Essex in 1964. Her family were keen on fencing so she had started by the age of five. Her father, Bert Bracewell, was the British fencing coach for sixteen years. He taught fencing from a stable in Kirkliston. She qualified as a lawyer gaining two prizes in her bar exams whilst working on the trading floors in London. She competed in the women's foil events at the 1990 European and World championships and the 1992 Summer Olympics in Barcelona. Bracewell was appointed an OBE in the 1999 Birthday Honours.

In 2005 she was named as the chair of Sportscotland replacing Alistair Dempster. She was the last permanent chair as after she stood down in February 2008, SportsScotland was merged to create a new body.

In 2017 she was working as a lawyer in the finance field.
