= Mary O'Neill (fencer) =

American fencer

Personal information
- Born: February 11, 1965 (age 61) Concord, Massachusetts

Sport
- Sport: Fencing
Medal record
Fencing
Pan American Games
| Gold medal – first place | 1987 Indianapolis | Team |

Mary O'Neill (born February 11, 1965) is an American former fencer. She graduated from University of Pennsylvania and Harvard Medical School. She competed in the women's individual and team foil events at the 1988 and 1992 Summer Olympics and won a gold medal at the 1987 Pan American Games in the team foil event.

== See also ==
- List of NCAA fencing champions
