= Rosa María Castillejo =

Spanish fencer

Personal information
- Born: 28 January 1969 (age 57) Madrid, Spain

Sport
- Sport: Fencing

Rosa María Castillejo (born 28 January 1969) is a Spanish épée and foil fencer. She competed at the 1992 and 1996 Summer Olympics.
