= Kim Jin-soon =

South Korean fencer (born 1968)

Personal information
- Born: 5 September 1968 (age 57)

Sport
- Sport: Fencing

- Kim Jin-soon
- Hangul: 김진순
- RR: Gim Jinsun
- MR: Kim Chinsun

Kim Jin-soon (born 5 September 1968) is a South Korean fencer. She competed in the women's foil events at the 1988 and 1992 Summer Olympics.
