= Gisèle Meygret =

French fencer (1963–1999)

Personal information
- Born: 30 July 1963 Nice, France
- Died: 25 July 1999 (aged 35)

Sport
- Sport: Fencing

Gisèle Meygret (30 July 1963 – 25 July 1999) was a French fencer. She competed in the women's foil events at the 1988 and 1992 Summer Olympics. He won a bronze medal in the individual sabre event at the 1991 Mediterranean Games.
