= Molly Sullivan Sliney =

American fencer

Personal information
- Born: 13 August 1966 (age 59) Methuen, Massachusetts, United States

Sport
- Sport: Fencing
Medal record
Women's fencing
Representing United States
Pan American Games
| Gold medal – first place | 1987 Indianapolis | Team Foil |
| Gold medal – first place | 1991 Havana | Team Foil |
USFA National Championships
| Gold medal – first place | 1985 | Under 20 Individual Foil |
| Gold medal – first place | 1985 | Individual Foil |
| Gold medal – first place | 1985 | Team Foil |

Molly Sullivan Sliney (born August 13, 1966) is a former American foil fencer, now working as a partner and fencing coach at Vivo Fencing Club in Haverhill, Massachusetts. Sliney also is a motivational speaker and speaks to students of all ages about her experiences.

== Biography ==
Sliney was a member of the 1988 and 1992 United States Olympic fencing teams. She also won two gold medals in The women's team foil event at the 1987 and 1991 Pan American Games. While fencing for the University of Notre Dame, she was the NCAA Women's Foil Individual Champion in 1986 and 1988. At the time she was listed in the Guinness Book of World Records for winning two individual NCAA titles. Sliney also was U.S. National Champion in 1985. In 1987, she led the Notre Dame Women's Foil Team to an NCAA championship by posting a 10–0 record in the tournament. This was the first time the Fighting Irish had ever won an NCAA Women's title in any sport. She graduated with a 160–14 record, and Notre Dame named her 1980s Female Athlete of the Decade.

Since retiring from competition in 1992, Sliney has been an active motivational speaker and fencing instructor. She primarily speaks to students, sharing her many experiences, including her experience with the learning disability dyslexia. Her presentations focus on the importance of reading, goal-setting and improving self-esteem.

In July, 2017, Sliney was inducted into the United States Fencing Hall of Fame.

In September, 2017, Sliney started Vivo Fencing Club along with Arpad Horvath in Haverhill, Massachusetts as a partner and fencing coach.

== See also ==
- List of NCAA fencing champions
- List of USFA Hall of Fame members
