= Fencing at the 1987 Pan American Games =

Fencing at the 1987 Pan American Games lists the results of all fencing-shooting events held at the 1987 Pan American Games in Indianapolis, Indiana, United States. Events for both men and women were held.

== Men's events ==
Event	Gold	Silver	Bronze
Individual épée	Carlos Alberto Pedroso; Cuba	Wilfredo Loyola; Cuba	Jean-Marc Chouinard; Canada}
Team épée	Cuba	United States	Colombia
Individual foil	Guillermo Betancourt; Cuba	Tulio Díaz Babier; Cuba	Michael Marx; United States
Team foil	Cuba	Canada	United States
Individual sabre	Jean-Paul Banos; Canada	Peter Westbrook; United States	Jean-Marie Banos; Canada
Team sabre	Cuba	United States	Canada

== Women's events ==
Event	Gold	Silver	Bronze
Individual épée	Tamara Esteri; Cuba	Yamila Figueroa; Cuba	Vincent Bradford; United States
Individual foil	Caitlin Bilodeaux; United States	Madeleine Philion; Canada	Caridad Estrada; Cuba
Team foil	United States	Cuba	Mexico

== Medal table ==
Place	Nation	Gold medal	Silver medal	Bronze medal	Total
1	Cuba	6	4	1	11
2	United States	2	3	3	8
3	Canada	1	2	3	6
4	Mexico	0	0	1	1
4	Colombia	0	0	1	1
Total		9	9	9	27
