= Renée Aubin =

Canadian fencer (born 1963)

Personal information
- Born: 17 October 1963 (age 62) Beauharnois, Quebec, Canada

Sport
- Sport: Fencing

Renée Aubin (born 17 October 1963) is a Canadian fencer. She competed in the women's individual and team foil events at the 1992 Summer Olympics. She participated in both the individual and team foil events, finishing 32nd in the individual and 12th with her team.
