= E Jie =

Chinese fencer

Personal information
- Born: 24 June 1967 (age 59)

Sport
- Sport: Fencing

E Jie (Chinese: 鄂傑; born 24 June 1967) is a Chinese fencer. She competed in the women's individual and team foil events at the 1992 Summer Olympics.
