= Lee Jeong-sook =

South Korean fencer

Personal information
- Born: 15 December 1971 (age 54)

Sport
- Sport: Fencing

- Lee Jeong-sook
- Hangul: 이정숙
- RR: I Jeongsuk
- MR: I Chŏngsuk

Lee Jeong-sook (born 15 December 1971) is a South Korean fencer. She competed in the women's individual and team foil events at the 1992 Summer Olympics.
