= Shin Seong-ja =

South Korean fencer

Personal information
- Born: 10 November 1968 (age 57)

Sport
- Sport: Fencing

Korean name
- Hangul: 신성자
- Hanja: 申成子
- RR: Sin Seongja
- MR: Sin Sŏngja

Shin Seong-ja (born 10 November 1968) is a South Korean fencer. She competed in the women's individual and team foil events at the 1988 and 1992 Summer Olympics. She married fellow fencer Kim Seung-pyo in 1993.
