= Fiona McIntosh (fencer) =

Scottish fencer

Personal information
- Born: 24 June 1960 (age 64); Edinburgh, Scotland

Sport
- Sport: Fencing

Fiona McIntosh (born 24 June 1960) is a Scottish writer and retired fencer.

== Biography ==
McIntosh was born in Edinburgh, Scotland and educated at Fitzwilliam College, Cambridge. During her fencing career, she was British champion four times, she won the Commonwealth Fencing Championships in 1990, collected a total of 12 Commonwealth medals and competed in the 1984, 1988, 1992 and 1996 Summer Olympics, reaching the finals in Barcelona 1992.

She has written articles for magazines, and worked with photographer Shaen Adey to produce books including Seven Days in Mauritius and Table Mountain Activity Guide, both published by Random House imprint Struik in 2004. McIntosh also worked as the editor of Divestyle Magazine.
