= Monika Maciejewska =

Polish fencer

Personal information
- Born: 22 May 1970 (age 56) Warsaw, Poland

Sport
- Sport: Fencing

Monika Katarzyna Maciejewska-Banit (born 22 May 1970) is a Polish fencer. She competed in the women's individual and team foil events at the 1992 Summer Olympics.
