= Barbara Wolnicka-Szewczyk =

Polish fencer (born 1970)

Personal information
- Born: 21 March 1970 (age 56) Katowice, Poland

Sport
- Sport: Fencing
Medal record
Women's fencing
Representing Poland
Olympic Games
Silver medal – second place	2000 Sydney	Foil, team

Barbara Mirosława Wolnicka-Szewczyk (born 21 March 1970) is a Polish fencer. She won a silver medal in the women's team foil event at the 2000 Summer Olympics.
