= Yelena Glikina =

Soviet fencer

Personal information
- Born: 11 March 1968 (age 58)

Sport
- Sport: Fencing

Yelena Glikina (born 11 March 1968) is a Soviet and Russian fencer. She competed in the women's individual and team foil events at the 1988 and 1992 Summer Olympics.
