= Tatyana Sadovskaya =

Soviet fencer

Personal information
- Born: 3 April 1966 (age 60)

Sport
- Sport: Fencing
Medal record
Women's fencing
Representing Unified Team
Olympic Games
Bronze medal – third place	1992 Barcelona	Foil, team

Tatyana Sadovskaya (born 3 April 1966) is a Soviet fencer. She won a bronze medal in the women's team foil event at the 1992 Summer Olympics.
