= Isabelle Spennato =

French fencer

Isabelle Spennato-Lamour
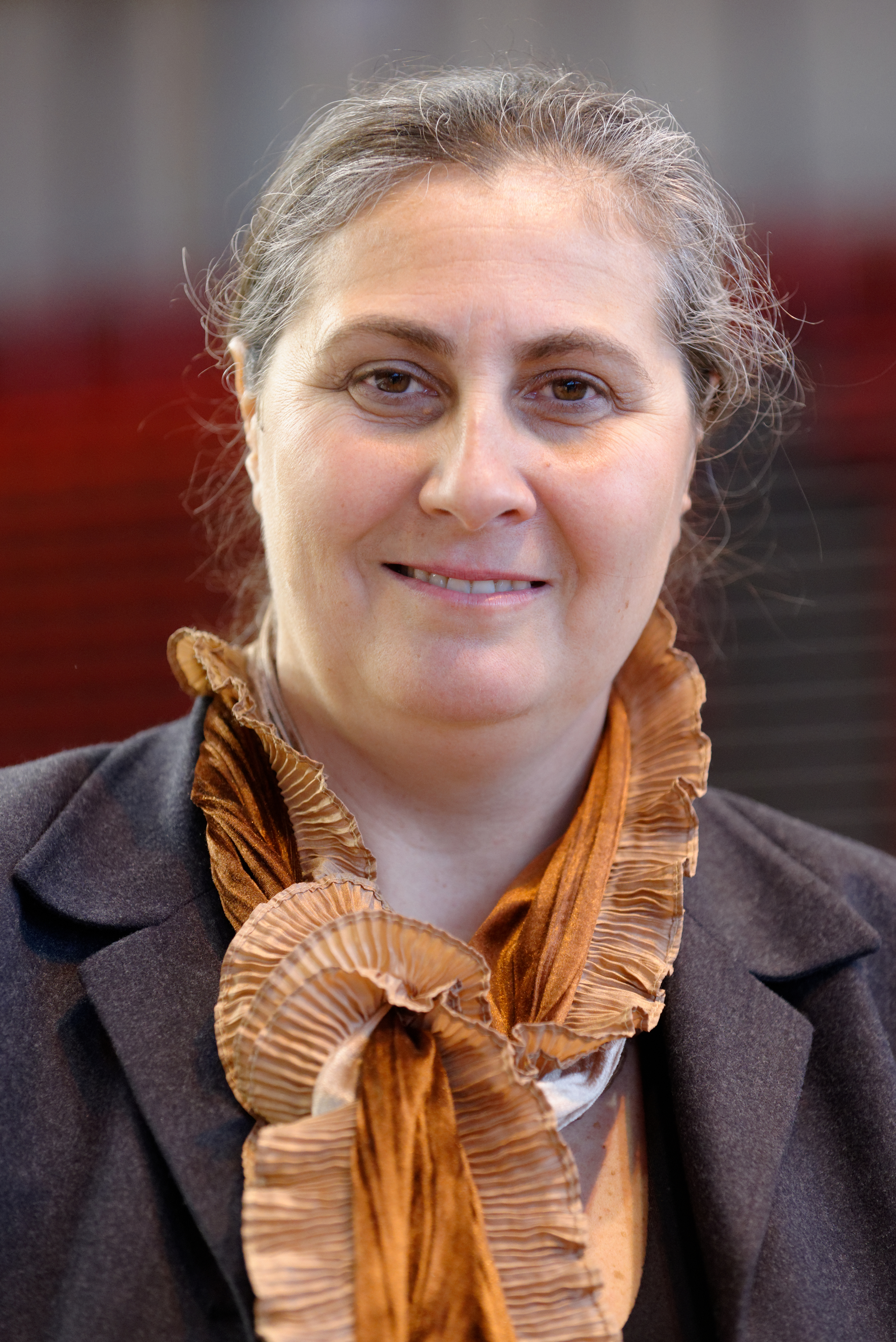
- Isabelle Spennato-Lamour in March 2013

Personal information
- Born: Isabelle Spennato; 17 March 1965 (age 61) Lyon, France
- Spouse: Jean-François Lamour

Sport
- Sport: Fencing

Isabelle Spennato-Lamour (born 17 March 1965) is a French fencer. She competed in the women's individual and team foil events at the 1988 and 1992 Summer Olympics. She is married to sabre Olympic champion Jean-François Lamour. In March 2013 she was elected president of the French Fencing Federation.
