= Anna Sobczak =

Polish fencer

Personal information
- Born: 2 November 1967 (age 58) Gdynia, Poland

Sport
- Sport: Fencing

Anna Sobczak (born 2 November 1967) is a Polish fencer. She competed in the women's individual and team foil events at the 1988 and 1992 Summer Olympics.
