= Thalie Tremblay =

Canadian fencer

Personal information
- Born: 6 June 1967 (age 59) Montreal, Quebec, Canada

Sport
- Sport: Fencing

Thalie Tremblay (born 6 June 1967) is a Canadian fencer. She competed in the women's individual and team foil events at the 1988 and 1992 Summer Olympics.
