= Caitlin Bilodeaux =

American fencer

Personal information
- Born: 17 March 1965 (age 61) Boston, Massachusetts, United States

Sport
- Sport: Fencing
Medal record
Representing United States
Pan American Games
Gold medal – first place	1987 Indianapolis	Individual foil
Gold medal – first place	1987 Indianapolis	Team foil
Gold medal – first place	1991 Havana	Team foil
Bronze medal – third place	1991 Havana	Individual foil

Caitlin Kelly Bilodeaux-Banos (born March 17, 1965) is an American fencer. She competed in the women's individual and team foil events at the 1988 and 1992 Summer Olympics. She is married to Jean-Marie Banos, who represented Canada at the Olympics in fencing.

She fenced for the Columbia Lions fencing team. She graduated from Columbia University in 1987, and was the first woman fencer to win multiple NCAA titles. In her freshman bio, she was described as "one of the most significant athletes ever to enter Columbia."

== See also ==
- List of NCAA fencing champions
- List of USFA Hall of Fame members
