= Gertrúd Stefanek =

Hungarian fencer (born 1959)

Personal information
- Born: 5 July 1959 (age 66) Ózd, Hungary

Sport
- Sport: Fencing
Medal record
Women's fencing
Representing Hungary
Olympic Games
Bronze medal – third place	1980 Moscow	Foil Team
Bronze medal – third place	1988 Seoul	Foil Team

Gertrúd Stefanek (born 5 July 1959, Ózd, Hungary) is a Hungarian fencer, who won two Olympic medals in the foil team competitions, in 1980 in Moscow and 1988 in Seoul.
