= List of flag bearers for Mauritius at the Olympics =

Mauritius at the Olympics
- IOC code: MRI
- NOC: Mauritius Olympic Committee
- Website: mauritiusolympic.org/en
- Medals: Gold 0 Silver 0 Bronze 1 Total 1

Summer appearances
- 1984; 1988; 1992; 1996; 2000; 2004; 2008; 2012; 2016; 2020; 2024

This is a list of flag bearers who have represented Mauritius at the Olympics.

Flag bearers carry the national flag of their country at the opening ceremony of the Olympic Games.

#	Event year	Season	Flag bearer	Sport
1	1984	Summer		
2	1988	Summer	Navind Ramsaran	Wrestling
3	1992	Summer		
4	1996	Summer	Khemraj Naïko	Athletics
5	2000	Summer	Michael Macaque	Boxing
6	2004	Summer	Michael Medor	Boxing
7	2008	Summer	Stéphane Buckland	Athletics
8	2012	Summer	Natacha Rigobert	Beach volleyball
9	2016	Summer	Kate Foo Kune	Badminton
10	2020	Summer	Richarno Colin	Boxing
10	2020	Summer	Roilya Ranaivosoa	Weightlifting
11	2024	Summer	Jean Gaël Laurent L'Entete	Triathlon
11	2024	Summer	Aurelie Halbwachs	Cycling

== See also ==
- Mauritius at the Olympics
