= Mauritius at the 1992 Summer Olympics =

- IOC code: MRI
- NOC: Mauritius Olympic Committee

in Barcelona
- Competitors: 13 (6 men and 7 women) in 4 sports
- Medals: Gold 0 Silver 0 Bronze 0 Total 0

Summer Olympics appearances (overview)
- 1984; 1988; 1992; 1996; 2000; 2004; 2008; 2012; 2016; 2020; 2024

Mauritius competed at the 1992 Summer Olympics in Barcelona, Spain.

== Competitors ==
The following is the list of number of competitors in the Games.

| Sport | Men | Women | Total |
|---|---|---|---|
| Athletics | 3 | 0 | 3 |
| Badminton | 1 | 2 | 3 |
| Sailing | 0 | 1 | 1 |
| Swimming | 2 | 4 | 6 |
| Total | 6 | 7 | 13 |

== Athletics ==
Men
Track and road events

| Athlete | Event | Heats | | Quarterfinal | | Semifinal | | Final | |
| Athlete | Event | Result | Rank | Result | Rank | Result | Rank | Result | Rank |
|---|---|---|---|---|---|---|---|---|---|
| Judex Lefou | 110 metres hurdles | 14.45 | 34 | Did not advance | | | | | |

Field events

| Athlete | Event | Qualification | | Final | |
| Athlete | Event | Distance | Position | Distance | Position |
|---|---|---|---|---|---|
| Khemraj Naïko | High jump | 2.10 | 33 | Did not advance | |
| Kersley Gardenne | Pole vault | 5.20 | 24 | Did not advance | |

== Badminton ==
Men

| Athlete | Event | Round of 64 | Round of 32 | Round of 16 | Quarterfinals | Semifinals | Final | |
| Athlete | Event | Opposition Result | Opposition Result | Opposition Result | Opposition Result | Opposition Result | Opposition Result | Rank |
|---|---|---|---|---|---|---|---|---|
| Édouard Clarisse | Singles | Wong (HKG); L 1–15, 2–15 | Did not advance | | | | | |

Women

| Athlete | Event | Round of 64 | Round of 32 | Round of 16 | Quarterfinals | Semifinals | Final | |
| Athlete | Event | Opposition Result | Opposition Result | Opposition Result | Opposition Result | Opposition Result | Opposition Result | Rank |
|---|---|---|---|---|---|---|---|---|
| Martine de Souza | Singles | Magnusson (SWE); L 1–11, 0–11 | Did not advance | | | | | |
| Vandanah Seesurun | Singles | Martin (DEN); L 1–11, 0–11 | Did not advance | | | | | |
| Martine de Souza; Vandanah Seesurun | Doubles | — | Mulasartsatorn / Sansaniyakulvilai (THA); L 2–15, 1–15 | Did not advance | | | | |

== Sailing ==
Women

| Athlete | Event | Race | | | | | | | | | | Net points | Final rank |
| Athlete | Event | 1 | 2 | 3 | 4 | 5 | 6 | 7 | 8 | 9 | 10 | Net points | Final rank |
|---|---|---|---|---|---|---|---|---|---|---|---|---|---|
| Marie Menage | Lechner A-390 | 29 | 29 | ~~31~~ | 28 | 29 | 29 | 31 | 29 | 26 | 31 | 261 | 23 |

== Swimming ==
Men

| Athlete | Event | Heats | | Final A/B | |
| Athlete | Event | Time | Rank | Time | Rank |
|---|---|---|---|---|---|
| Bernard Desmarais | 100 metre breaststroke | 1:07.75 | 45 | Did not advance | |
| Bernard Desmarais | 200 metre breaststroke | 2:31.52 | 45 | Did not advance | |
| Benoît Fleurot | 200 metre freestyle | 1:59.73 | 42 | Did not advance | |
| Benoît Fleurot | 400 metre freestyle | 4:12.05 | 42 | Did not advance | |
| Benoît Fleurot | 1500 metre freestyle | 16:43.46 | 28 | Did not advance | |
| Benoît Fleurot | 200 metre butterfly | 2:13.09 | 43 | Did not advance | |

Women

| Athlete | Event | Heats | | Final A/B | |
| Athlete | Event | Time | Rank | Time | Rank |
|---|---|---|---|---|---|
| Corinne Leclair | 100 metre freestyle | 1:00.95 | 44 | Did not advance | |
| Corinne Leclair | 200 metre freestyle | 2:12.55 | 35 | Did not advance | |
| Corinne Leclair | 400 metre freestyle | 4:43.53 | 33 | Did not advance | |
| Corinne Leclair; Luanne Maurice; Annabelle Mariejeanne; Nathalie Lam | 4 × 100 metre freestyle relay | 4:09.96 | 13 | Did not advance | |

== Sources ==
- Official Olympic Reports
- sports-reference
