= List of Mauritian records in athletics =

The following are the national records in athletics in Mauritius maintained by its national athletics federation: Mauritius Athletics Association (MAA).

== Outdoor ==
Key to tables: Awaiting ratification Record not kept by MAA Not ratified or later rescinded by MAA

=== Men ===
Event	Record	Athlete	Date	Meet	Place	Ref.
100 m	10.11 (+0.8 m/s)	Noa Bibi	7 June 2024	Meeting National à thème de Colmar	Colmar, France	
200 m	19.89 (+1.3 m/s)	Noa Bibi	10 July 2022	French U23 Championships	Albi, France	
300 m	32.57	Eric Milazar	12 June 2005	Meeting Lille-Métropole	Villeneuve-d'Ascq, France	
400 m	44.69	Eric Milazar	7 July 2001		Madrid, Spain	
800 m	1:48.24	Désiré Pierre-Louis	1 May 1994		Gainesville, United States	
1500 m	3:46.22	Mohammed Dookun	2 April 2016	Mauritius International Meet	Réduit, Mauritius	
3000 m	8:13.40	Mike Félicité	28 October 1994		Saint-Paul, Réunion	
5000 m	14:08.90	Mike Félicité	15 June 1994		Saint-Maur, France	
10,000 m	30:26.42	Menon Ramsamy	4 September 2003		Réduit, Mauritius	
10,000 m	29:50.6 h (Note: recognised by World Athletics but not ratified by MAA)	Menon Ramsamy	10 August 1998		St. Paul, Réunion	
10 km (road)	31:54+	David Carver	17 April 2016	Hamburg Marathon	Hamburg, Germany	
15 km (road)	47:41+	David Carver	17 April 2016	Hamburg Marathon	Hamburg, Germany	
20 km (road)	1:03:45+	David Carver	17 April 2016	Hamburg Marathon	Hamburg, Germany	
Half marathon	1:06:29	Menon Ramsamy	16 June 2001		Réduit, Mauritius	
25 km (road)	1:19:58+	David Carver	17 April 2016	Hamburg Marathon	Hamburg, Germany	
30 km (road)	1:36:27+	David Carver	17 April 2016	Hamburg Marathon	Hamburg, Germany	
Marathon	2:18:20	David Carver	17 April 2016 (Note: also by World Athletics source; MAA lists Paris Marathon on April 12, 2015, but Carver ran 2:21:57 at that competition)	Hamburg Marathon	Hamburg, Germany	
110 m hurdles	13.31 (+1.5 m/s)	Jérémie Lararaudeuse	10 June 2025	Meeting International de Montreuil	Montreuil, France	
400 m hurdles	49.94	Gilbert Hashan	29 July 1996	Olympic Games	Atlanta, United States	
3000 m steeplechase	8:55.66	Patrick Moonsamy	15 June 1994		Saint-Maur, France	
High jump	2.28 m	Khemraj Naiko	19 September 1998	Commonwealth Games	Kuala Lumpur, Malaysia	
High jump	2.28 m	Khemraj Naiko	27 May 1996		Dakar, Senegal	
Pole vault	5.50 m (Note: Outdoor best; indoor mark ratified as absolute record.)	Jean-Kersley Gardenne	12 June 1996		Dreux, France	
Pole vault	5.50 m	Jean-Kersley Gardenne	24 May 1998		Bonneuil-sur-Marne, France	
Pole vault	5.50 m	Jean-Kersley Gardenne	8 July 1998		Paris, France	
Long jump	8.28 m (±0.0 m/s)	Jonathan Chimier	24 August 2004	Olympic Games	Athens, Greece	
Triple jump	16.96 m (+1.5 m/s)	Jonathan Drack	29 July 2015	Meeting National	Castres, France	
Shot put	18.87 m A	Bernard Baptiste	14 March 2024	ASA Athletics Grand Prix 1	Potchefstroom, South Africa	
Discus throw	55.88 m	Christopher Sophie	26 August 2019	African Games	Rabat, Morocco	
Discus throw	59.78 m	Christopher Sophie	1 August 2023	Jeux de la Francophonie	Kinshasa, Democratic Republic of the Congo	
Hammer throw	64.20 m (Note: ratified by MAA but not recognized by World Athletics)	Jean Ian Carre	30 August 2023		Madagascar	
Hammer throw	63.64 m (Note: recognized by World Athletics)	Nicolas Li Yun Fong	3 July 2003		Réduit, Mauritius	
Javelin throw	69.70 m	Fabio Ramsamy	15 May 2005		Réduit, Mauritius	
Decathlon	7591 pts	Guillaume Thierry	13–14 September 2015	All-Africa Games	Brazzaville, Republic of the Congo	
Decathlon	100m (wind) / Long jump (wind) / Shot put / High jump / 400m / 110m H (wind) / Discus / Pole vault / Javelin / 1500m; 11.57 (−0.1 m/s) / 7.15 m (+0.2) / 14.36 m / 1.91 m / 52.57 / 15.04 (+0.1 m/s) / 43.13 m / 4.60 m / 63.26 m / 4:39.97					
3000 m walk (track)	11:46.92	Jérome Caprice	8 July 2018		Athlone, Ireland	
5000 m walk (track)	20:09.63	Jérome Caprice	7 May 2017		Blois, France	
5 km walk (road)	21:46	Jérome Caprice	9 December 2017		Dublin, Ireland	
10,000 m walk (track)	44:12.43	Jérome Caprice	29 July 2018	GloHealth Senior Championships	Dublin, Ireland	
20,000 m walk (track)	1:37:38.10	Jérome Caprice	4 September 2016		Drunen, Netherlands	
20 km walk (road)	1:28:49	Jérôme Caprice	12 March 2017		La Roche-sur-Yon, France	
30 km walk (road)	2:26:28	Jérôme Caprice	7 December 2019	National Race Walking 30K/20K Championships	Dublin, Ireland	
35 km walk (road)	2:53:47	Jérôme Caprice	23 April 2022		Dublin, Ireland	
50 km walk (road)	4:13:41	Jérôme Caprice	23 March 2019 (Note: 25 March 2019 by MAA source, probably a mistake)	Dudinská Päťdesiatka	Dudince, Slovakia	
4 × 100 m relay	38.99	Mauritius; Arnaud Casquette; Eric Milazar; Fernando Augustin; Stéphane Buckland	11 August 2001	World Championships	Edmonton, Canada	
4 × 400 m relay	3:06.21	Mauritius; Eric Milazar; Dominique Méyépa; Désiré Pierre-Louis; Dario Clément	18 September 1995	All-Africa Games	Harare, Zimbabwe	

=== Women ===
Event	Record	Athlete	Date	Meet	Place	Ref.
100 m	11.64 (+1.6 m/s)	Oceanne Moirt	7 June 2024	Meeting National à thème de Colmar	Colmar, France	
200 m	23.83 NWI	Jane Thondojee	14 April 1994		Chapel Hill, United States	
400 m	54.62	Sandra Govinden	25 June 1992		Belle Vue Maurel, Mauritius	
800 m	2:03.62	Sheila Seebaluck	2 July 1988		Sarreguemines, France	
800 m	1:58.73	Rachel Klopfenstein	16 June 2026	Golden Spike Ostrava	Ostrava, Czech Republic	
1500 m	4:19.59	Josiane Nairac-Boullé	30 August 1988	African Championships	Annaba, Algeria	
3000 m	9:14.37	Josiane Nairac-Boullé	1 September 1988		Annaba, Algeria	
5000 m	16:54.62	Marie Perrier	14 August 2020		Balma, France	
5000 m	16:52.76 (Note: not ratified by MAA but recognized by World Athletics)	Marie Perrier	22 May 2021	Secteur individuel Zone Ouest	Albi, France	
5 km (road)	16:56+	Marie Perrier	22 October 2023	Valencia Half Marathon	Valencia, Spain	
10,000 m	34:43.31	Marie Perrier	13 April 2019	French 10000m Championships	Pacé, France	
10 km (road)	33:49+	Marie Perrier	22 October 2023	Valencia Half Marathon	Valencia, Spain	
15 km (road)	50:45+	Marie Perrier	22 October 2023	Valencia Half Marathon	Valencia, Spain	
20 km (road)	1:07:36+	Marie Perrier	22 October 2023	Valencia Half Marathon	Valencia, Spain	
Half marathon	1:11:13 Mx	Marie Perrier	22 October 2023	Valencia Half Marathon	Valencia, Spain	
Half marathon	1:13:21 Wo	Marie Perrier	20 September 2026	World Road Running Championships	Copenhagen, Denmark	
25 km (road)	1:26:41+	Marie Perrier	3 December 2023	Valencia Marathon	Valencia, Spain	
30 km (road)	1:44:10+	Marie Perrier	3 December 2023	Valencia Marathon	Valencia, Spain	
Marathon	2:26:19	Marie Perrier	3 December 2023	Valencia Marathon	Valencia, Spain	
100 m hurdles	14.10 (+1.3 m/s)	Stéphanie Domaingue	23 June 2001		Val-de-Reuil, France	
400 m hurdles	1:00.08	Sandra Govinden	27 June 1992		Belle Vue Maurel, Mauritius	
3000 m steeplechase	11:57.32	Rachel Michel	4 August 2015	Indian Ocean Island Games	St. Paul, Réunion	
High jump	1.79 m	Christine Béchard	11 May 1986		Réduit, Mauritius	
High jump	1.79 m	Arielle Brette	25 July 2004		Réduit, Mauritius	
Pole vault	3.71 m	Nancy Cheekoussen	25 July 2004		Réduit, Mauritius	
Long jump	6.03 m NWI	Machella Février	31 May 2025		Réduit, Mauritius	
Triple jump	13.80 m (−0.6 m/s)	Liliane Potiron	4 August 2023	Jeux de la Francophonie	Kinshasa, Democratic Republic of Congo	
Shot put	13.79 m	Bernadette Perrine	10 August 1997		Réduit, Mauritius	
Discus throw	51.54 m	Caroline Fournier	26 June 1996		Montreuil-sous-Bois, France	
Hammer throw	62.06 m	Caroline Fournier	30 June 1996		Montgeron, France	
Javelin throw	54.57 m	Bernadette Ravina	30 June 2002		Réduit, Mauritius	
Heptathlon	5241 pts	Stéphanie Domaingue	23–24 June 2001		Val-de-Reuil, France	
Heptathlon	100m H (wind) / High jump / Shot put / 200m (wind) / Long jump (wind) / Javelin / 800m; 14.10 (+1.3 m/s) / 1.63 m / 10.28 m / 26.26 / 5.83 m / 37.21 m / 2:23.95					
5000 m walk (track)	24:44.49	Yolène Raffin	23 March 2003		Réduit, Mauritius	
10,000 m walk (track)	53:06.92	Yolène Raffin	22 May 2004		Réduit, Mauritius	
20 km walk (road)	1:44:15	Yolene Raffin	2 May 2004		Naumburg, Germany	
50 km walk (road)						
4 × 100 m relay	45.89	Mauritius; Joanilla Janvier; Aurélie Alcindor; Stéphanie Guillaume; Amélie Anthony	5 August 2015	Indian Ocean Island Games	St. Paul, Réunion	
4 × 400 m relay	3:39.92	Mauritius; Sandra Govinden; Gilliane Quirin; Christine Duvergé; Sheila Seebaluck	30 August 1990	Indian Ocean Island Games	Antananarivo, Madagascar	

== Indoor ==
=== Men ===
Event	Record	Athlete	Date	Meet	Place	Ref.
60 m	6.68	Jonathan Chimier	23 February 2003		Moscow, Russia	
200 m	20.95	Jean-Yann de Grace	4 February 2018		Aubière, France	
400 m	46.28	Eric Milazar	26 February 2006		Aubière, France	
600 m	1:17.92	Désiré Pierre-Louis	4 March 1998	NAIA Championships	Nebraska, United States	
800 m	1:50.60 OT	Désiré Pierre-Louis	15 February 1992	Texas Tech Invitational	Lubbock, United States	
1500 m						
3000 m						
60 m hurdles	7.60	Jérémie Lararaudeuse	23 January 2026	Meeting de Nantes	Nantes, France	
High jump	2.21 m	Khemraj Naiko	23 January 1999		Hirson, France	
Pole vault	5.60 m	Jean-Kersley Gardenne	15 January 1998	Meeting Pas de Calais	Liévin, France	
Long jump	8.05 m	Jonathan Chimier	22 February 2004		Aubière, France	
Triple jump	16.67 m	Jonathan Drack	6 February 2016	Weltklasse in Karlsruhe	Karlsruhe, Germany	
Shot put	18.20 m	Henry-Bernard Baptiste	2 February 2019		Kirchberg, Luxembourg	
Heptathlon	5061 pts	Gino Antoine	5 February 1995		Nogent-sur-Oise, France	
Heptathlon	60m / Long jump / Shot put / High jump / 60m H / Pole vault / 1000m; 7.37 / 6.70 m / 10.48 m / 1.98 m / 8.76 / 4.50 m / 2:56.05					
5000 m walk	20:39.24	Jérome Caprice	17 February 2018		Abbotstown, Ireland	
4 × 400 m relay						

=== Women ===
Event	Record	Athlete	Date	Meet	Place	Ref.
60 m	7.84	Marie Jane Vincent	10 March 2012	World Championships	Istanbul, Turkey	
200 m	26.79	Stéphanie Domaingue	18 January 2002		Eaubonne, France	
400 m	1:06.50	Elsa Lepoigneur	19 December 2009		Liévin, France	
400 m	1:01.20	Ananxya Lebrasse	15 January 2023		Metz, France	
400 m	1:00.29	Ananxya Lebrasse	11 February 2024	French U23/U20/U18 Championships	Metz, France	
800 m	2:06.91	Sheila Seebaluck	21 February 1988	French Championships	Liévin, France	
1500 m	4:25.85	Sheila Seebaluck	27 February 1994		Bordeaux, France	
3000 m						
60 m hurdles	8.77	Stéphanie Domaingue	18 February 2001	Meeting Pas de Calais	Liévin, France	
High jump	1.63 m	Julie Sheik-Cassim	11 December 2004		Salon-de-Provence, France	
Pole vault						
Long jump	5.72 m	Stéphanie Domaingue	26 January 2002		Bordeaux, France	
Triple jump						
Shot put	13.38 m	Christine Béchard	14 December 1986		Paris, France	
Pentathlon	3598 pts	Stéphanie Domaingue	13 February 2000		Nogent-sur-Oise, France	
Pentathlon	60m H / High jump / Shot put / Long jump / 800m; 8.85 / 1.57 m / 10.09 m / 5.44 m / 2:26.45					
3000 m walk						
4 × 400 m relay						
