= Mauritius at the 2004 Summer Olympics =

- IOC code: MRI
- NOC: Mauritius Olympic Committee

in Athens
- Competitors: 9 in 5 sports
- Flag bearer: Michael Medor
- Medals: Gold 0 Silver 0 Bronze 0 Total 0

Summer Olympics appearances (overview)
- 1984; 1988; 1992; 1996; 2000; 2004; 2008; 2012; 2016; 2020; 2024; 2028

Mauritius competed at the 2004 Summer Olympics in Athens, Greece, from 13 to 29 August 2004. This was the nation's sixth consecutive appearance at the Olympics.

Mauritius Olympic Committee sent the nation's smallest delegation to the Games since the 1988 Summer Olympics in Seoul. A total of nine athletes, six men and three women, competed only five different sports. Boxer Michael Medor was the nation's flag bearer in the opening ceremony. There was only a single competitor in archery, boxing, and weightlifting.

Mauritius, however, has yet to win its first ever Olympic medal. Sprinter Stephane Buckland set the nation's historical milestone as the first Mauritian athlete to reach an Olympic final with a prospect of bringing home a medal for the team, but managed only to finish strongly in sixth place.

== Archery ==
One Mauritian archer qualified for the men's individual archery through a tripartite invitation.

Men

Athlete	Event	Ranking round		Round of 64	Round of 32	Round of 16	Quarterfinals	Semifinals	Final / BM	
Athlete	Event	Score	Seed	Opposition Score	Opposition Score	Opposition Score	Opposition Score	Opposition Score	Opposition Score	Rank
Yehya Bundhun	Men's individual	494	64	Im D-H (KOR); L 109–162	did not advance					

== Athletics ==
Mauritian athletes have so far achieved qualifying standards in the following athletics events (up to a maximum of 3 athletes in each event at the 'A' Standard, and 1 at the 'B' Standard).

Men
Track & road events

Athlete	Event	Heat		Quarterfinal		Semifinal		Final	
Athlete	Event	Result	Rank	Result	Rank	Result	Rank	Result	Rank
Stéphan Buckland	200 m	20.29	1 Q	20.36	2 Q	20.37	3 Q	20.24	6
Eric Milazar	400 m	45.34	3 q	—N/a		45.23	5	did not advance	

Field events

Athlete	Event	Qualification		Final	
Athlete	Event	Distance	Position	Distance	Position
Jonathan Chimier	Long jump	8.28 NR	2 Q	8.03	10

Women
Track & road events

Athlete	Event	Final	
Athlete	Event	Result	Rank
Yolene Raffin	20 km walk	1:49:28	51

Key

- Note–Ranks given for track events are within the athlete's heat only
- Q = Qualified for the next round
- q = Qualified for the next round as a fastest loser or, in field events, by position without achieving the qualifying target
- NR = National record
- N/A = Round not applicable for the event
- Bye = Athlete not required to compete in round

== Boxing ==
Mauritius sent a single boxer to Athens.

Athlete	Event	Round of 32	Round of 16	Quarterfinals	Semifinals	Final	
Athlete	Event	Opposition Result	Opposition Result	Opposition Result	Opposition Result	Opposition Result	Rank
Michael Medor	Lightweight	Mönkh-Erdene (MGL); L 23–29	did not advance				

== Swimming ==
Men

Athlete	Event	Heat		Semifinal		Final	
Athlete	Event	Time	Rank	Time	Rank	Time	Rank
Chris Hackel	50 m freestyle	25.33	62	did not advance			

Women

Athlete	Event	Heat		Semifinal		Final	
Athlete	Event	Time	Rank	Time	Rank	Time	Rank
Diane Etiennette	50 m freestyle	30.00	58	did not advance			

== Weightlifting ==
Mauritius has qualified a single weightlifter.

Athlete	Event	Snatch		Clean & Jerk		Total	Rank
Athlete	Event	Result	Rank	Result	Rank	Total	Rank
Marie Jesika Dalou	Women's −75 kg	57.5	15	72.5	14	130	14

== See also ==
- Mauritius at the 2004 Summer Paralympics
