= 2nd AIBA African 2004 Olympic Qualifying Tournament =

The 2nd AIBA African 2004 Olympic Boxing Qualifying Tournament was held in Gaborone, Botswana from March 15 to March 22, 2004. It was the second and last chance for amateur boxers from Africa to qualify for the 2004 Summer Olympics after the 2003 All-Africa Games in Abuja, Nigeria. The number one and two earned a ticket for the Olympic Tournament in Athens, Greece, except for the heavyweight and super heavyweight division (no berths at stake).

== Medal winners ==
| Event | Gold | Silver | Bronze |
|---|---|---|---|
| Light Flyweight (– 48 kilograms) | Lalaina Rabenarivo (MAD) | Effiong Okon (NGR) | Romeo Lemboumba (GAB) Joseph Jermia (NAM) |
| Flyweight (– 51 kilograms) | Lechedzani Luza (BOT) | Georges Rakotoarimbelo (MAD) | Okudu Nicodemus (KEN) Martin Mubiru (UGA) |
| Bantamweight (– 54 kilograms) | Hamid Ait Bighrade (MAR) | Abel Aferalign (ETH) | Emmanuel Kayabwe (ZAM) Mzimeni Msutu (RSA) |
| Featherweight (– 57 kilograms) | Khumiso Ikgopoleng (BOT) | Ludumo Galada (RSA) | Johnson Molle (SEY) Eric Anamba (CMR) |
| Lightweight (– 60 kilograms) | Michael Medor (MRI) | Sam Rukundo (UGA) | Yakubu Andu (GHA) Gilbert Khunwane (BOT) |
| Light Welterweight (– 64 kilograms) | Kitson Julie (SEY) | Mohamed Hekal (EGY) | Lartei Lartey (GHA) Bongani Mwelase (RSA) |
| Welterweight (– 69 kilograms) | Sadat Tebazaalwa (UGA) | Ellis Chibuye (ZAM) | Leonard Bundu (SLE) Willy Bertrand Tankeu (CMR) |
| Middleweight (– 75 kilograms) | Nabil Kassel (ALG) | Mohamed Sahraoui (TUN) | Eric Ngoma (GAB) Malehim Adura (NGR) |
| Light Heavyweight (– 81 kilograms) | Taylor Mabika (GAB) | Pierre Yana (CMR) | Mourad Sahraoui (TUN) Dirang Thipe (BOT) |

== Qualified ==
=== Light Flyweight (– 48 kg) ===
- Lalaina Rabenarivo (MAD)
- Effiong Okon (NGR)

=== Flyweight (– 51 kg) ===
- Lechedzani Luza (BOT)
- Georges Rakotoarimbelo (MAD)

=== Bantamweight (– 54 kg) ===
- Hamid Ait Bighrade (MAR)
- Abel Aferalign (ETH)

=== Featherweight (– 57 kg) ===
- Khumiso Ikgopoleng (BOT)
- Ludumo Galada (RSA)

=== Lightweight (– 60 kg) ===
- Michael Medor (MRI)
- Sam Rukundo (UGA)

=== Light Welterweight (– 64 kg) ===
- Kitson Julie (SEY)
- Mohamed Hekal (EGY)

=== Welterweight (– 69 kg) ===
- Sadat Tebazaalwa (UGA)
- Ellis Chibuye (ZAM)

=== Middleweight (– 75 kg) ===
- Nabil Kassel (ALG)
- Mohamed Sahraoui (TUN)

=== Light Heavyweight (– 81 kg) ===
- Taylor Mabika (GAB)
- Pierre Yana (CMR)

== See also ==
- Boxing at the 2003 All-Africa Games
- 1st AIBA African 2004 Olympic Qualifying Tournament
