= Mauritius at the 1984 Summer Olympics =

- IOC code: MRI
- NOC: Mauritius Olympic Committee

in Los Angeles
- Competitors: 4 (3 men and 1 woman) in 1 sport
- Medals: Gold 0 Silver 0 Bronze 0 Total 0

Summer Olympics appearances (overview)
- 1984; 1988; 1992; 1996; 2000; 2004; 2008; 2012; 2016; 2020; 2024

Mauritius competed in the Olympic Games for the first time at the 1984 Summer Olympics in Los Angeles, United States.

== Results by event ==
=== Athletics ===
Men's 100 metres

- Daniel André

- Heat — 11.19 (→ did not advance)

Men's 200 metres

- Daniel André

- Heat — 22.16 (→ did not advance)

Men's 400 metres

- Daniel André

- Heat — 49.09 (→ did not advance)

Men's Decathlon

- Vivian Coralie

- Final Result — 6084 points (→ 25th place)

Men's Discus Throw

- Dominique Bechard

- Qualification — 41.10 (→ did not advance, 18th place)

Men's Hammer Throw

- Dominique Bechard

- Qualification — no mark (→ did not advance, no ranking)

Women's Discus Throw

- Christine Béchard

- Qualification — 37.94m (→ did not advance, 17th place)
