= Effiong Okon =

Nigerian boxer

Personal information
- Full name: Effiong Okon
- Nationality: Nigeria
- Born: 22 May 1985 (age 41)
- Weight: 48 kg (106 lb)

Sport
- Sport: Boxing
- Weight class: Light Flyweight

Effiong Okon (born 22 May 1985) is a boxer from Nigeria, who participated in the 2004 Summer Olympics for his country. There he was outscored in the first round of the men's light flyweight (– 48 kg) division by Italy's Alfonso Pinto.

Okon qualified for the 2004 Athens Games by ending up in second place at the 2nd AIBA African 2004 Olympic Qualifying Tournament in Gaborone, Botswana. In the final he was defeated by Madagascar's Lalaina Rabenarivo.
