= Mauritius at the 2016 Summer Olympics =

- IOC code: MRI
- NOC: Mauritius Olympic Committee

in Rio de Janeiro
- Competitors: 12 in 8 sports
- Flag bearer: Kate Foo Kune
- Medals: Gold 0 Silver 0 Bronze 0 Total 0

Summer Olympics appearances (overview)
- 1984; 1988; 1992; 1996; 2000; 2004; 2008; 2012; 2016; 2020; 2024

Mauritius competed at the 2016 Summer Olympics in Rio de Janeiro, Brazil, from 5 to 21 August 2016. This was the nation's ninth consecutive appearance at the Summer Olympics.

Mauritius Olympic Committee confirmed a team of 11 athletes, five men and six women, to compete in eight sports at the Games. The nation's roster in Rio de Janeiro was relatively larger than those sent to both Beijing 2008 and London 2012 by a single athlete. Among the sports represented by the athletes, Mauritius marked its Olympic comeback in badminton and weightlifting after an eight-year absence.

Three Mauritian athletes returned from the previous Games, including judoka Christianne Legentil (women's 52 kg), freestyle swimmer Heather Arseth, and triathlete Fabienne St. Louis, who was able to compete despite being diagnosed with salivary gland cancer eight months earlier. Meanwhile, Africa's top-ranked badminton player and 2010 Youth Olympian Kate Foo Kune was selected by the committee to carry the Mauritian flag at the opening ceremony.

For the second consecutive time, Mauritius left Rio de Janeiro without a single Olympic medal. Unable to reach the final, Legentil managed to reproduce her seventh-place feat from London 2012 as the most successful finish for the Mauritians at these Games, losing the match to Russia's Natalia Kuziutina in the repechage round.

== Athletics (track and field) ==
Mauritian athletes have so far achieved qualifying standards in the following athletics events (up to a maximum of 3 athletes in each event):

Key

- Note–Ranks given for track events are within the athlete's heat only
- Q = Qualified for the next round
- q = Qualified for the next round as a fastest loser or, in field events, by position without achieving the qualifying target
- NR = National record
- N/A = Round not applicable for the event
- Bye = Athlete not required to compete in round

Track & road events

Athlete	Event	Heat		Semifinal		Final	
Athlete	Event	Time	Rank	Time	Rank	Time	Rank
David Carver	Men's marathon	—N/a				2:26:16	102
Aurelie Alcindor	Women's 200 m	24.55	7	Did not advance			

Field events

Athlete	Event	Qualification		Final	
Athlete	Event	Distance	Position	Distance	Position
Jonathan Drack	Men's triple jump	16.21	28	Did not advance	

== Badminton ==
Mauritius has qualified one badminton player for the women's singles into the Olympic tournament. Kate Foo Kune picked up a continental berth as Africa's top shuttler based on her performance in the BWF World Rankings as of 5 May 2016, signifying the country's return to the sport after a 16-year hiatus.

Athlete	Event	Group Stage			Elimination	Quarterfinal	Semifinal	Final / BM	
Athlete	Event	Opposition Score	Opposition Score	Rank	Opposition Score	Opposition Score	Opposition Score	Opposition Score	Rank
Kate Foo Kune	Women's singles	Buranaprasertsuk (THA); L (7–21, 18–21)	Chen H-y (AUS); W (21–16, 21–19)	2	Did not advance				

== Boxing ==
Mauritius has entered two boxers to compete in the following weight classes into the Olympic boxing tournament. Merven Clair and top seeded boxer Kennedy St-Pierre had claimed their Olympic spots at the 2016 African Qualification Tournament in Yaoundé, Cameroon.

Athlete	Event	Round of 32	Round of 16	Quarterfinals	Semifinals	Final	
Athlete	Event	Opposition Result	Opposition Result	Opposition Result	Opposition Result	Opposition Result	Rank
Merven Clair	Men's middleweight	Abdin (EGY); L 0–3	Did not advance				
Kennedy St-Pierre	Men's heavyweight	Bye	Bouloudinat (ALG); W 2–1	Levit (KAZ); L 0–3	Did not advance		

== Judo ==
Mauritius has qualified one judoka for the women's half-lightweight category (52 kg) at the Games. London 2012 quarterfinalist Christianne Legentil earned a continental quota spot from the African region as Mauritius' top-ranked judoka based on points in the IJF World Ranking List of May 30, 2016.

Athlete	Event	Round of 32	Round of 16	Quarterfinals	Semifinals	Repechage	Final / BM	
Athlete	Event	Opposition Result	Opposition Result	Opposition Result	Opposition Result	Opposition Result	Opposition Result	Rank
Christianne Legentil	Women's −52 kg	Fahmy (KSA); W 100–000	Cohen (ISR); W 001–000	Kelmendi (KOS); L 000–000 S	Did not advance	Kuziutina (RUS); L 000–100	Did not advance	7

== Swimming ==
Mauritius has received a Universality invitation from FINA to send two swimmers (one male and one female) to the Olympics.

Athlete	Event	Heat		Semifinal		Final	
Athlete	Event	Time	Rank	Time	Rank	Time	Rank
Bradley Vincent	Men's 100 m freestyle	50.89	49	Did not advance			
Heather Arseth	Women's 100 m freestyle	58.89	37	Did not advance			

== Triathlon ==
Mauritius has entered one triathlete to compete at the Games. London 2012 Olympian Fabienne St Louis was selected as the highest-ranked triathlete from Africa in the women's event based on the ITU Points List.

Athlete	Event	Swim (1.5 km)	Trans 1	Bike (40 km)	Trans 2	Run (10 km)	Total Time	Rank
Fabienne St. Louis	Women's	25:30	Did not finish					

== Weightlifting ==
Mauritius has received an unused quota place from IWF to send a female weightlifter to the Olympics, signifying the nation's return to the sport after an eight-year hiatus.

Athlete	Event	Snatch		Clean & Jerk		Total	Rank
Athlete	Event	Result	Rank	Result	Rank	Total	Rank
Roilya Ranaivosoa	Women's −48 kg	80	8	93	10	173	9
