= Mauritius at the 2000 Summer Olympics =

- IOC code: MRI
- NOC: Mauritius Olympic Committee

in Sydney
- Competitors: 20 (16 men and 4 women) in 8 sports
- Flag bearer: Michael Macaque
- Medals: Gold 0 Silver 0 Bronze 0 Total 0

Summer Olympics appearances (overview)
- 1984; 1988; 1992; 1996; 2000; 2004; 2008; 2012; 2016; 2020; 2024

Mauritius competed at the 2000 Summer Olympics in Sydney, Australia.

== Competitors ==
The following is the list of number of competitors in the Games.

Sport	Men	Women	Total
Archery	1	0	1
Athletics	5	1	6
Badminton	3	2	5
Boxing	3	–	3
Judo	1	0	1
Swimming	1	1	2
Table tennis	1	0	1
Weightlifting	1	0	1
Total	16	4	20

== Archery ==
Athlete	Event	Ranking round		Round of 64	Round of 32	Round of 16	Quarterfinals	Semifinals	Final / BM	
Athlete	Event	Score	Seed	Opposition Score	Opposition Score	Opposition Score	Opposition Score	Opposition Score	Opposition Score	Rank
Yehya Bundhun	Men's individual	537	62	Kim (KOR); L 141–169	did not advance					

== Athletics ==
Key

- Note–Ranks given for track events are within the athlete's heat only
- Q = Qualified for the next round
- q = Qualified for the next round as a fastest loser or, in field events, by position without achieving the qualifying target
- NR = National record
- N/A = Round not applicable for the event
- Bye = Athlete not required to compete in round

Men
Track and road events

Athletes	Events	Heat Round 1		Heat Round 2		Semifinal		Final	
Athletes	Events	Time	Rank	Time	Rank	Time	Rank	Time	Rank
Stéphane Buckland	100 metres	10.35	19 Q	10.26	17	did not advance			
Stéphane Buckland	200 metres	20.81	20 Q	20.53	15 Q	20.56	10	did not advance	
Éric Milazar	400 metres	45.66	17 q	45.52	17	did not advance			
Jonathan Chimier; Éric Milazar; Stéphane Buckland; Fernando Augustin	4 × 100 metres relay	39.55	22	—N/a		did not advance			

Field events

Athlete	Event	Qualification		Final	
Athlete	Event	Distance	Position	Distance	Position
Arnaud Casquette	Long jump	7.57	35	did not advance	

Women
Field events

Athlete	Event	Qualification		Final	
Athlete	Event	Distance	Position	Distance	Position
Caroline Fournier	Hammer throw	56.18	25	did not advance	

== Badminton ==
Athlete	Event	Round of 64	Round of 32	Round of 16	Quarterfinals	Semifinals	Final / BM	
Athlete	Event	Opposition Result	Opposition Result	Opposition Result	Opposition Result	Opposition Result	Opposition Result	Rank
Denis Constantin	Men's singles	Bye	Gade (DEN); L 3–15, 9–15	did not advance				
Denis Constantin; Édouard Clarisse	Men's doubles	—N/a	Knowles / Robertson (GBR); L 6–15, 10–15	did not advance				
Amrita Sawaram	Women's singles	Mann (GBR); L 0–11, 0–11	did not advance					
Amrita Sawaram; Marie-Hélène Pierre	Women's doubles	—N/a	Iwata / Matsuda (JPN); L 2–15, 2–15	did not advance				
Marie-Hélène Pierre; Stephan Beeharry	Mixed doubles	—N/a	Solmundson / Beres (CAN); L 2–15, 6–15	did not advance				

== Boxing ==
Men

Athlete	Event	Round of 32	Round of 16	Quarterfinals	Semifinals	Final	
Athlete	Event	Opposition Result	Opposition Result	Opposition Result	Opposition Result	Opposition Result	Rank
Riaz Durgahed	Bantamweight	Cermeño (VEN); L 4–16	did not advance				
Giovanni Frontin	Lightweight	Cruz (COL); L 9–10	did not advance				
Michael Macaque	Super heavyweight	—N/a	Binkowski (CAN); L 14–21	did not advance			

== Judo ==
Men

Athlete	Event	Round of 32	Round of 16	Quarterfinals	Semifinals	Repechage 1	Repechage 2	Repechage 3	Final / BM	
Athlete	Event	Opposition Result	Opposition Result	Opposition Result	Opposition Result	Opposition Result	Opposition Result	Opposition Result	Opposition Result	Rank
Jean-Claude Raphael	−90 kg	Florescu (MDA); W	Xu (CHN); W	Morgan (CAN); L	Did not advance	Bye	Salimov (AZE); L	did not advance		

== Swimming ==
Men

Athlete	Event	Heat		Semifinal		Final	
Athlete	Event	Time	Rank	Time	Rank	Time	Rank
Christophe Lim	100 m freestyle	54.33	66	did not advance			

Women

Athlete	Event	Heat		Semifinal		Final	
Athlete	Event	Time	Rank	Time	Rank	Time	Rank
Nathalie Lee Baw	100 m freestyle	1:06.67	50	did not advance			

== Table tennis ==
Athlete	Event	Group stage		Round of 16	Quarterfinals	Semifinals	Final / BM	
Athlete	Event	Opposition Result	Opposition Result	Opposition Result	Opposition Result	Opposition Result	Opposition Result	Rank
Patrick Sahajasein	Men's singles	Franz (GER); L 0–3	Syed (GBR); L 0–3	did not advance				

== Weightlifting ==
Men

Athlete	Event	Snatch		Clean & Jerk		Total	Rank
Athlete	Event	Result	Rank	Result	Rank	Total	Rank
Gino Soupprayen Padiatty	-56 kg	95	19	115	19	210	19

== Sources ==
- sports-reference
- Wallechinsky, David (2004). The Complete Book of the Summer Olympics (Athens 2004 Edition). Toronto, Canada. ISBN 1-894963-32-6.
- International Olympic Committee (2001). The Results. Retrieved 12 November 2005.
- Sydney Organising Committee for the Olympic Games (2001). Official Report of the XXVII Olympiad Volume 1: Preparing for the Games. Retrieved 20 November 2005.
- Sydney Organising Committee for the Olympic Games (2001). Official Report of the XXVII Olympiad Volume 2: Celebrating the Games. Retrieved 20 November 2005.
- Sydney Organising Committee for the Olympic Games (2001). The Results. Retrieved 20 November 2005.
- International Olympic Committee Web Site
