= Mauritius at the 2024 Summer Olympics =

- IOC code: MRI
- NOC: Mauritius Olympic Committee

in Paris, France 26 July 2024 – 11 August 2024
- Competitors: 13 (7 men and 6 women) in 7 sports
- Flag bearers (opening): Jean Gael Laurent L'Entete & Aurelie Halbwachs
- Flag bearer (closing): Jean de Falbaire
- Medals: Gold 0 Silver 0 Bronze 0 Total 0

Summer Olympics appearances (overview)
- 1984; 1988; 1992; 1996; 2000; 2004; 2008; 2012; 2016; 2020; 2024

Mauritius competed at the 2024 Summer Olympics in Paris from 26 July to 11 August 2024. It was the nation's eleventh consecutive appearance at the Summer Olympics, having appeared in every Summer Games since its official debut in 1984.

== Competitors ==
The following is the list of number of competitors in the Games.

| Sport | Men | Women | Total |
|---|---|---|---|
| Athletics | 1 | 1 | 2 |
| Badminton | 1 | 1 | 2 |
| Cycling | 1 | 2 | 3 |
| Judo | 1 | 0 | 1 |
| Sailing | 1 | 1 | 2 |
| Swimming | 1 | 1 | 2 |
| Triathlon | 1 | 0 | 1 |
| Total | 7 | 6 | 13 |

== Athletics ==
Mauritian track and field athletes achieved the entry standards for Paris 2024, either by passing the direct qualifying mark (or time for track and road races) or by world ranking, in the following events (a maximum of 3 athletes each):

Key

- Note–Ranks given for track events are within the athlete's heat only
- Q = Qualified for the next round
- q = Qualified for the next round as a fastest loser or, in field events, by position without achieving the qualifying target
- NR = National record
- N/A = Round not applicable for the event
- Bye = Athlete not required to compete in round

Track and road events

| Athlete | Event | Preliminary | | Heat | | Repechage | | Semifinal | | Final | |
| Athlete | Event | Result | Rank | Result | Rank | Result | Rank | Result | Rank | Result | Rank |
|---|---|---|---|---|---|---|---|---|---|---|---|
| Noa Bibi | Men's 100 m | 10.27 | 1 Q | 10.19 | 6 | — | | Did not advance | | | |
| Marie Perrier | Women's marathon | — | | | | | | | | 2:34:56 SB | 54 |

== Badminton ==
Mauritius entered two badminton players into the Olympic tournament based on the BWF Race to Paris Rankings.

| Athlete | Event | Group stage | | | Elimination | Quarter-final | Semi-final | Final / BM | |
| Athlete | Event | Opposition Score | Opposition Score | Rank | Opposition Score | Opposition Score | Opposition Score | Opposition Score | Rank |
|---|---|---|---|---|---|---|---|---|---|
| Julien Paul | Men's singles | Vitidsarn (THA); L (9–21, 12–21) | Koljonen (FIN); L (5–21, 11–21) | 3 | Did not advance | | | | |
| Kate Foo Kune | Women's singles | Yavarivafa (EOR); W (21–5, 21–11) | Yeo (SGP); L (12–21, 6–21) | 2 | Did not advance | | | | |

== Cycling ==
=== Road ===
For the first time since 2012, Mauritius entered one male and one female rider to compete in the road race events at the Olympic, through the establishment of UCI Nation Ranking and 2023 African Championships in Accra, Ghana.

| Athlete | Event | Time | Rank |
|---|---|---|---|
| Christopher Lagane | Men's road race | DNF | |
| Kimberley Le Court | Women's road race | DNF | |

=== Mountain biking ===
Mauritian mountain bikers secured one female quota place for the Olympic through the 2023 African Championships in Johannesburg, South Africa.

| Athlete | Event | Time | Rank |
|---|---|---|---|
| Aurelie Halbwachs | Women's cross-country | DNF | |

== Judo ==
Mauritius qualified one judoka for the following weight class at the Games. Rémi Feuillet (men's middleweight, 90 kg) got qualified via continental quota based on Olympic point rankings.

| Athlete | Event | Round of 64 | Round of 32 | Round of 16 | Quarterfinals | Semifinals | Repechage | Final / BM | |
| Athlete | Event | Opposition Result | Opposition Result | Opposition Result | Opposition Result | Opposition Result | Opposition Result | Opposition Result | Rank |
|---|---|---|---|---|---|---|---|---|---|
| Rémi Feuillet | Men's −90 kg | — | Kaljulaid (EST); L 00–10 | Did not advance | | | | | |

== Sailing ==
For the first time since 1992, Mauritian sailors qualified two boats each in the following classes through the 2023 African Qualification Regatta in Soma Bay, Egypt.

Elimination events

| Athlete | Event | Race | | | | | | | | | | | | | | | | | | | | Final rank |
| Athlete | Event | 1 | 2 | 3 | 4 | 5 | 6 | 7 | QF | SF1 | SF2 | SF3 | SF4 | SF5 | SF6 | F1 | F2 | F3 | F4 | F5 | F6 | Final rank |
|---|---|---|---|---|---|---|---|---|---|---|---|---|---|---|---|---|---|---|---|---|---|---|
| Jean de Falbaire | Men's Formula Kite | 17 | 15 | 15 | ~~21~~ | ~~21~~ | 15 | 16 | — | Did not advance | | | | | | | | | | | | 19 |
| Julie Paturau | Women's Formula Kite | 18 | 17 | 17 | ~~21~~ | DNC | DNS | — | — | Did not advance | | | | | | | | | | | | 20 |

M = Medal race; EL = Eliminated – did not advance into the medal race

== Swimming ==
Mauritius sent two swimmers to compete at the 2024 Paris Olympics.

| Athlete | Event | Heat | | Semifinal | | Final | |
| Athlete | Event | Time | Rank | Time | Rank | Time | Rank |
|---|---|---|---|---|---|---|---|
| Ovesh Purahoo | Men's 100 m freestyle | 52.22 | 60 | Did not advance | | | |
| Anishta Teeluck | Women's 200 m backstroke | 2:18.67 | 27 | Did not advance | | | |

== Triathlon ==
For the first time since 2016, Mauritius sent only one athlete, Jean Gaël Laurent L'Entete received a quota based on African individual Olympic ranking.

Individual

| Athlete | Event | Time | | | | | | Rank |
| Athlete | Event | Swim (1.5 km) | Trans 1 | Bike (40 km) | Trans 2 | Run (10 km) | Total | Rank |
|---|---|---|---|---|---|---|---|---|
| Jean Gaël Laurent L'Entete | Men's | 25.10 | Lapped | | | | | |
