= Mauritius at the 1996 Summer Olympics =

- IOC code: MRI
- NOC: Mauritius Olympic Committee

in Atlanta
- Competitors: 26 (21 men and 5 women) in 6 sports
- Flag bearer: Khemraj Naïko
- Medals: Gold 0 Silver 0 Bronze 0 Total 0

Summer Olympics appearances (overview)
- 1984; 1988; 1992; 1996; 2000; 2004; 2008; 2012; 2016; 2020; 2024

Mauritius competed at the 1996 Summer Olympics in Atlanta, United States.

== Competitors ==
The following is the list of number of competitors in the Games.

Sport	Men	Women	Total
Athletics	12	0	12
Badminton	2	2	4
Boxing	3	–	3
Judo	1	2	3
Swimming	1	1	2
Weightlifting	2	–	2
Total	21	5	26

== Results and competitors by event ==
=== Athletics ===
==== Men ====
Track and road events

Athletes	Events	Heat Round 1		Heat Round 2		Semifinal		Final	
Athletes	Events	Time	Rank	Time	Rank	Time	Rank	Time	Rank
Barnabé Jolicoeur	100 metres	10.57	64	Did not advance					
Ajay Chuttoo	Marathon	N/A						2:42:07	103
Judex Lefou	110 metres hurdles	14.69	60	Did not advance					
Gilbert Hashan	400 metres hurdles	49.94	31	N/A		Did not advance			
Arnaud Casquette; Dominique Méyépa; Bruno Potanah; Barnabé Joliceour	4 x 100 metres relay	40.92	28	N/A		Did not advance			
Gilbert Hashan; Désiré Pierre-Louis; Rudy Tirvengadum; Eric Milazar	4 x 400 metres relay	3:08.17	22	N/A		Did not advance			

Field events

Athlete	Event	Qualification		Final	
Athlete	Event	Result	Rank	Result	Rank
Khemraj Naïko	High jump	2.20	24	Did not advance	
Kersley Gardenne	Pole vault	NM		Did not advance	

=== Badminton ===
Men

Athlete	Event	Round of 64		Round of 32		Round of 16		Quarterfinals		Semifinals		Final		
Athlete	Event	Opposition	Score	Opposition	Score	Opposition	Score	Opposition	Score	Opposition	Score	Opposition	Score	Rank
Stephan Beeharry	Singles	Machida (JPN)	L 11-15 5-15	Did not advance										
Édouard Clarisse	Singles	Liu (TPE)	L 10-15 2-15	Did not advance										
Stephan Beehary; Édouard Clarisse	Doubles	N/A		(Australia) Blackburn, Staight (AUS)	L 3-15 8-15	Did not advance								

Women

Athlete	Event	Round of 64		Round of 32		Round of 16		Quarterfinals		Semifinals		Final		
Athlete	Event	Opposition	Score	Opposition	Score	Opposition	Score	Opposition	Score	Opposition	Score	Opposition	Score	Rank
Martine de Souza	Singles	Wibowo (SUI)	L 7-11 11-7 3-11	Did not advance										
Marie-Josephe Jean-Pierre	Singles	Mizui (JPN)	L 2-11 1-11	Did not advance										
Martine de Souza; Marie-Josephe Jean-Pierre	Doubles	N/A		(Germany) Schmidt, Ubben (GER)	L 1-15 2-15	Did not advance								

Mixed

Athlete	Event	Round of 64		Round of 32		Round of 16		Quarterfinals		Semifinals		Final		
Athlete	Event	Opposition	Score	Opposition	Score	Opposition	Score	Opposition	Score	Opposition	Score	Opposition	Score	Rank
Martine de Souza; Stephan Beeharry	Doubles	N/A		(Denmark) Kirkegaard, Eriksen (DEN)	L 6-15 8-15	Did not advance								
Marie-Josephe Jean-Pierre; Édouard Clarisse	Doubles	N/A		(Sweden) Crabo, Antonsson (SWE)	L 4-15 12-15	Did not advance								

=== Boxing ===
Athlete	Event	Round of 32	Round of 16	Quarterfinal	Semifinal	Final
Athlete	Event	Opposition Result	Opposition Result	Opposition Result	Opposition Result	Opposition Result
Richard Sunee	Flyweight	Pakeyev (RUS); L 8-1	Did not advance			
Steve Nariana	Bantamweight	Nolasco (DOM); L 18-14	Did not advance			
Josian Lebon	Featherweight	Yağlı (TUR); W 9-8	Chacón (ARG); L 14-9	Did not advance		

=== Judo ===
Men

Athlete	Event	Result
Antonio Felicité	Half-Heavyweight	9

Women

Athlete	Event	Result
Priscilla Cherry	Middleweight	14
Marie Michele St. Louis	Half-Heavyweight	13

=== Swimming ===
Men

Athletes	Events	Heat		Finals	
Athletes	Events	Time	Rank	Time	Rank
Bernard Desmarais	100 m breaststroke	1:09.05	43	Did not advance	

Women

Athletes	Events	Heat		Finals	
Athletes	Events	Time	Rank	Time	Rank
Ingrid Louis	50 m freestyle	29.56	53	Did not advance	

=== Weightlifting ===
Athletes	Events	Snatch		Clean & jerk		Total	Rank
Athletes	Events	Result	Rank	Result	Rank	Total	Rank
Gino Soupprayen Padiatty	-54 kg	95.0	21	105.0	21	200.0	21
Shirish Rummun	-108 kg	132.5	20	155.0	18	287.5	18
