= Zhao Kun =

Chinese swimmer

Personal information
- Born: 10 January 1973 (age 53) Hebei, China

Sport
- Sport: Swimming
Medal record
Women's Swimming
Representing China
Silver medal – second place	1992 Barcelona	4x100 m freestyle relay

Zhao Kun (simplified Chinese: 赵坤; traditional Chinese: 趙坤; pinyin: Zhào Kūn; born 10 January 1973 in Hebei) is a Chinese former swimmer who competed in the 1992 Summer Olympics. She swam in the heats of the 4x100 m freestyle relay.
