= Abel Aferalign =

Ethiopian boxer (born 1983)

Abel Aferalign (born 24 August 1983) is an Ethiopian bantamweight boxer. Competing at the 2004 Summer Olympics in Athens, Greece, Aferalign lost to Bulgarian Detelin Dalakliev in the round of 32.

Aferalign qualified for the 2004 Athens Games by ending up in second place at the 2nd AIBA African 2004 Olympic Qualifying Tournament in Gaborone, Botswana. In the final, he was defeated by Morocco's Hamid Ait Bighrade.

Olympic Games
Preceded by Derartu Tulu	Flagbearer for Ethiopia; Athens 2004	Succeeded by Robel Teklemariam
