= Ellis Chibuye =

Zambian boxer (born 1980)

Medal record

Representing Zambia

Men's Boxing

All-Africa Games
Bronze medal – third place	2003 Abuja	Welterweight

Ellis Chibuye (born January 14, 1980) is a Zambian boxer.

He was born in Ndola. He participated in the 2004 Summer Olympics for his native African country. There he was stopped in the first round of the Welterweight (69 kg) division by Turkey's Bülent Ulusoy.

Chibuye qualified for the 2004 Athens Games by ending up in second place at the 2nd AIBA African 2004 Olympic Qualifying Tournament in Gaborone, Botswana. In the final he was defeated by Uganda's Sadat Tebazaalwa.

Chibuye won the bronze medal in the same division one year earlier, at the All-Africa Games in Abuja, Nigeria.
