= Mauritius at the 2008 Summer Olympics =

- IOC code: MRI
- NOC: Mauritius Olympic Committee

in Beijing
- Competitors: 12 in 7 sports
- Flag bearer: Stephan Buckland
- Medals Ranked 80th: Gold 0 Silver 0 Bronze 1 Total 1

Summer Olympics appearances (overview)
- 1984; 1988; 1992; 1996; 2000; 2004; 2008; 2012; 2016; 2020; 2024

Mauritius competed in the 2008 Summer Olympics held in Beijing, People's Republic of China from August 8 to August 24, 2008. Bruno Julie won Mauritius's first ever medal (bronze) in boxing.

== Medalists ==
Medal	Name	Sport	Event	Date
Bronze	Bruno Julie	Boxing	Bantamweight	August 22

== Archery ==
Mauritius sent archers to the Olympics for the third time, seeking the nation's first Olympic medal in the sport. The country was given one spot in the women's individual competition via Tripartite Commission invitation; Veronique D'Unienville will be Mauritius's representative.

Athlete	Event	Ranking round		Round of 64	Round of 32	Round of 16	Quarterfinals	Semifinals	Final / BM	
Athlete	Event	Score	Seed	Opposition Score	Opposition Score	Opposition Score	Opposition Score	Opposition Score	Opposition Score	Rank
Veronique D'Unienville	Women's individual	605	53	Román (MEX) (12); L 97–108	Did not advance					

== Athletics ==
Key

- Note–Ranks given for track events are within the athlete's heat only
- Q = Qualified for the next round
- q = Qualified for the next round as a fastest loser or, in field events, by position without achieving the qualifying target
- NR = National record
- N/A = Round not applicable for the event
- Bye = Athlete not required to compete in round

Men
Track & road events

Athlete	Event	Heat		Quarterfinal		Semifinal		Final	
Athlete	Event	Result	Rank	Result	Rank	Result	Rank	Result	Rank
Stephan Buckland	200 m	20.98	3 Q	20.37 SB	5 q	20.48	6	Did not advance	
Eric Milazar	400 m	46.06	7	—		Did not advance			

Field events

Athlete	Event	Qualification		Final	
Athlete	Event	Distance	Position	Distance	Position
Arnaud Casquette	Long jump	DNS		Did not advance	

Women
Track & road events

Athlete	Event	Heat		Semifinal		Final	
Athlete	Event	Result	Rank	Result	Rank	Result	Rank
Annabelle Lascar	400 m	2:06.11	5	Did not advance			

== Badminton ==
Athlete	Event	Round of 64	Round of 32	Round of 16	Quarterfinal	Semifinal	Final / BM	
Athlete	Event	Opposition Score	Opposition Score	Opposition Score	Opposition Score	Opposition Score	Opposition Score	Rank
Karen Foo Kune	Women's singles	Bye	Lu L (CHN); L 3–21, 1–7^{ret}	Did not advance				

== Boxing ==
Mauritius qualified two boxers for the Olympic boxing tournament. Julie and Colin both earned spots at the second African qualifying tournament. Bruno Julie is the first Olympic medalist for Mauritius since the nation began competing at the 1984 Summer Olympics. Julie secured a bronze medal with the quarterfinal victory over Venezuela's Héctor Manzanilla on August 18, 2008.

Athlete	Event	Round of 32	Round of 16	Quarterfinals	Semifinals	Final	
Athlete	Event	Opposition Result	Opposition Result	Opposition Result	Opposition Result	Opposition Result	Rank
Bruno Julie	Bantamweight	Nketu (LES); W 17–8	Tadjibayev (UZB); W 16–4	Manzanilla (VEN); W 13–9	León (CUB); L 5–7	Did not advance	3rd place, bronze medalist(s)
Richarno Colin	Light welterweight	Carvalho (BRA); W 15–11	Kovalev (RUS); L 2–11	Did not advance			

== Cycling ==
=== Road ===
Athlete	Event	Time	Rank
Aurelie Halbwachs	Women's road race	3:52:11	62

== Swimming ==
Men

Athlete	Event	Heat		Semifinal		Final	
Athlete	Event	Time	Rank	Time	Rank	Time	Rank
Gael Adam	100 m freestyle	52.35	57	Did not advance			

Women

Athlete	Event	Heat		Semifinal		Final	
Athlete	Event	Time	Rank	Time	Rank	Time	Rank
Diane Etiennette	50 m freestyle	28.83	63	Did not advance			

== Weightlifting ==
Athlete	Event	Snatch		Clean & Jerk		Total	Rank
Athlete	Event	Result	Rank	Result	Rank	Total	Rank
Ravi Bhollah	Men's −94 kg	125	18	150	16	275	16
