= Swimming at the 1992 Summer Olympics – Women's 4 × 100 metre freestyle relay =

Women's 4 × 100 metre freestyle relay at the Games of the XXV Olympiad
- Venue: Piscines Bernat Picornell
- Date: 28 July 1992 (heats & final)
- Competitors: 60 from 13 nations
- Teams: 13
- Winning time: 3:39.46 WR

Medalists
1st place, gold medalist(s)		Nicole Haislett, Angel Martino, Jenny Thompson, Dara Torres, Ashley Tappin*, Crissy Ahmann-Leighton*	United States
2nd place, silver medalist(s)		China; Le Jingyi, Lü Bin, Zhuang Yong, Yang Wenyi, Zhao Kun*	China
3rd place, bronze medalist(s)		Franziska van Almsick, Daniela Hunger, Simone Osygus, Manuela Stellmach, Kerstin Kielgaß*, Annette Hadding*; *Indicates the swimmer only competed in the preliminary heats.	Germany

The women's 4 × 100 metre freestyle relay event at the 1992 Summer Olympics took place on 28 July at the Piscines Bernat Picornell in Barcelona, Spain.

== Records ==
Prior to this competition, the existing world and Olympic records were as follows.

World record	East Germany (GDR); Kristin Otto (54.73); Manuela Stellmach (54.96); Sabina Schulze (55.52); Heike Friedrich (55.36)	3:40.57	Madrid, Spain	19 August 1986
Olympic record	East Germany; Kristin Otto (55.11); Katrin Meissner (54.73); Daniela Hunger (55.69); Manuela Stellmach (55.10)	3:40.63	Seoul, South Korea	22 September 1988

The following new world and Olympic records were set during this competition.

Date	Event	Name	Nationality	Time	Record
28 July	Final	Nicole Haislett (55.33); Dara Torres (55.33); Angel Martino (54.79); Jenny Thompson (54.01)	United States	3:39.46	WR

== Results ==
=== Heats ===
Rule: The eight fastest teams advance to the final (Q).

Rank	Heat	Lane	Nation	Swimmers	Time	Notes
1	2	4	United States	Angel Martino (54.83); Ashley Tappin (55.68); Crissy Ahmann-Leighton (55.55); Dara Torres (55.51)	3:41.57	Q
2	1	3	China	Zhao Kun (56.95); Lü Bin (55.61); Yang Wenyi (55.51); Le Jingyi (55.34)	3:43.41	Q
3	2	5	Germany	Manuela Stellmach (56.10); Kerstin Kielgaß (55.85); Annette Hadding (56.35); Daniela Hunger (55.28)	3:43.58	Q
4	1	5	Netherlands	Mildred Muis (56.71); Diana van der Plaats (55.75); Inge de Bruijn (56.03); Marianne Muis (55.51)	3:44.00	Q
5	2	7	Unified Team	Natalya Meshcheryakova (56.05); Svetlana Leshukova (56.38); Yevgeniya Yermakova (56.43); Yelena Dendeberova (56.20)	3:45.06	Q
6	1	2	Sweden	Eva Nyberg (57.12); Linda Olofsson (57.38); Louise Karlsson (56.79); Ellenor Svensson (56.86)	3:48.15	Q
7	2	3	Denmark	Berit Puggaard (58.38); Gitta Jensen (55.66); Annette Poulsen (58.16); Mette Jacobsen (56.58)	3:48.78	Q
8	2	6	Canada	Marianne Limpert (57.11); Allison Higson (57.80); Nikki Dryden (58.26); Andrea Nugent (56.11)	3:49.28	Q
9	1	4	Australia	Angela Mullens (57.78); Lise Mackie (57.88); Nicole Stevenson (58.25); Lisa Curry (55.73)	3:49.64	
10	1	6	Japan	Ayako Nakano (57.36); Yoko Koikawa (57.45); Shina Matsudo (58.05); Suzu Chiba (57.05)	3:49.91	
11	2	2	France	Julie Blaise (57.54); Julia Reggiani (57.62); Marie-Laure Giraudon (57.78); Véronique Jardin (57.28)	3:50.22	
12	1	7	Romania	Diana Ureche (58.43); Carla Negrea (1:00.26); Beatrice Câșlaru (59.34); Luminița Dobrescu (57.49)	3:55.52	
13	2	8	Mauritius	Corinne Leclair (1:00.99); Luanne Maurice (1:02.94); Annabelle Mariejeanne (1:03.66); Nathalie Lam (1:02.37)	4:09.96	

=== Final ===
Rank	Lane	Nation	Swimmers	Time	Notes
1st place, gold medalist(s)	4	United States	Nicole Haislett (55.33); Dara Torres (55.33); Angel Martino (54.79); Jenny Thompson (54.01)	3:39.46	WR
2nd place, silver medalist(s)	5	China	Zhuang Yong (54.51) OR; Lü Bin (55.90); Yang Wenyi (54.90); Le Jingyi (54.81)	3:40.12	AS
3rd place, bronze medalist(s)	3	Germany	Franziska van Almsick (54.99); Simone Osygus (55.74); Daniela Hunger (55.12); Manuela Stellmach (55.75)	3:41.60	
4	2	Unified Team	Natalya Meshcheryakova (55.69); Svetlana Leshukova (56.56); Yelena Dendeberova (55.79); Yelena Shubina (55.64)	3:43.68	
5	6	Netherlands	Diana van der Plaats (56.68); Mildred Muis (55.75); Marianne Muis (55.53); Karin Brienesse (55.78)	3:43.74	
6	1	Denmark	Gitta Jensen (56.13); Mette Jacobsen (56.26); Berit Puggaard (57.67); Mette Nielsen (57.75)	3:47.81	NR
7	7	Sweden	Eva Nyberg (57.37); Louise Karlsson (56.50); Ellenor Svensson (57.66); Malin Nilsson (56.94)	3:48.47	
8	8	Canada	Marianne Limpert (57.06); Nikki Dryden (57.65); Andrea Nugent (56.79); Allison Higson (57.87)	3:49.37	
