= Sadat Tebazaalwa =

Ugandan boxer (born 1985)

Personal information
- Born: October 23, 1985 (age 40)
Medal record
Men's Boxing
Representing Uganda
All-Africa Games
| Bronze medal – third place | 2003 Abuja | Light Welterweight |

Sadat Tebazaalwa (born October 23, 1985) is a Ugandan amateur boxer who participated in the 2004 Summer Olympics. There he was defeated in the first round of the welterweight (-69 kg) division by China's Kanat Islam.

He qualified for the Athens Games by winning the gold medal at the 2nd AIBA African 2004 Olympic Qualifying Tournament in Gaborone, Botswana. In the final he defeated Zambia's Ellis Chibuye. In 2003, Tebazaalwa won the bronze medal in his weight division at the All-Africa Games in Abuja, Nigeria.
