= Kitson Julie =

Seychellois boxer (born 1983)

Personal information
- Nationality: Seychellois
- Born: 28 July 1983 (age 42)
- Height: 1.79 m (5 ft 10 1/2 in)
- Weight: 64 kg (141 lb)

Sport
- Sport: Boxing
- Weight class: Light welterweight

Kitson Julie (born 28 July 1983) is a Seychellois former boxer.

Kitson qualified for the 2004 Summer Olympics by winning that year's African Championship gold medal in Gaborone. He competed in the light welterweight event at the Games in Athens and was defeated in the first round by his Australian opponent Anoushiravan Nourian.

As of 2014, Julie was still boxing and had moved up to heavyweight level.
