= Badminton at the 2024 Summer Olympics – Women's singles =

Women's singles at the Games of the XXXIII Olympiad
- Venue: Porte de La Chapelle Arena
- Dates: 27 July – 5 August 2024
- Competitors: 39 from 34 nations

Medalists
1st place, gold medalist(s)		An Se-young	South Korea
2nd place, silver medalist(s)		He Bingjiao	China
3rd place, bronze medalist(s)		Gregoria Mariska Tunjung	Indonesia

The women's singles badminton tournament at the 2024 Summer Olympics took place from 27 July to 5 August 2024 at the Porte de La Chapelle Arena in Paris. A total of 39 players from 34 nations competed at the tournament.

South Korea's An Se-young defeated China's He Bingjiao in the final, 21–13, 21–16, to win the gold medal in women's singles badminton at the 2024 Summer Olympics. An subsequently became the first women's singles gold medalist from South Korea since Bang Soo-hyun, who achieved the feat in 1996. Gregoria Mariska Tunjung of Indonesia won the bronze medal after Spain's Carolina Marín was forced to withdraw from the match due to a knee injury.

China's Chen Yufei was the defending Olympic champion, but failed to retain the title after losing to compatriot He Bingjiao in the quarter-finals.

== Format ==
The 39 players were split into 13 groups of three players each. They played a round-robin tournament with the top-placed player advancing to the knockout stage. Each match was played in a best-of-3.

== Schedule ==
The schedule was as follows.

Legend

P	Preliminaries	R	Round of 16	QF	Quarter-finals	SF	Semi-finals	M	Medal matches

27 Jul	28 Jul	29 Jul	30 Jul	31 Jul	1 Aug	2 Aug	3 Aug	4 Aug	5 Aug
P					R		QF	SF	M

== Draw ==
The draw was held on 12 July 2024.

== Seeds ==
The top 13 players of the BWF World Ranking were seeded.

1. An Se-young (KOR) (gold medalist)
2. Chen Yufei (CHN) (quarter-finals)
3. Tai Tzu-ying (TPE) (group stage)
4. Carolina Marín (ESP) (fourth place)
5. Akane Yamaguchi (JPN) (quarter-finals)
6. He Bingjiao (CHN) (silver medalist)
7. Gregoria Mariska Tunjung (INA) (bronze medalist)
8. Aya Ohori (JPN) (quarter-finals)
9. Beiwen Zhang (USA) (round of 16)
10. P. V. Sindhu (IND) (round of 16)
11. Supanida Katethong (THA) (round of 16)
12. Kim Ga-eun (KOR) (round of 16)
13. Yeo Jia Min (SGP) (round of 16)

== Group stage ==
All times are local (UTC+2).

=== Group A ===
Pos	Team	Pld	W	L	GF	GA	GD	PF	PA	PD	Pts	Qualification
1	An Se-young (KOR)	2	2	0	4	0	+4	84	38	+46	2	Quarter-finals
2	Kaloyana Nalbantova (BUL)	2	1	1	2	2	0	68	78	−10	1	
3	Qi Xuefei (FRA) (H)	2	0	2	0	4	−4	48	84	−36	0	

Source: Olympics
(H) Host

Date	Time	Player 1	Score	Player 2	Set 1	Set 2	Set 3	Report
28 July	15:40	An Se-young (South Korea)	2–0	(Bulgaria) Kaloyana Nalbantova	21–15	21–11		Report
30 July	14:00	Qi Xuefei (France)	0–2	(Bulgaria) Kaloyana Nalbantova	18–21	18–21		Report
31 July	19:30	An Se-young (South Korea)	2–0	(France) Qi Xuefei	21–5	21–7		Report

=== Group C ===
Pos	Team	Pld	W	L	GF	GA	GD	PF	PA	PD	Pts	Qualification
1	Akane Yamaguchi (JPN)	2	2	0	4	1	+3	106	75	+31	2	Round of 16
2	Michelle Li (CAN)	2	1	1	3	2	+1	99	103	−4	1	
3	Thet Htar Thuzar (MYA)	2	0	2	0	4	−4	61	88	−27	0	

Source: Olympics

Date	Time	Player 1	Score	Player 2	Set 1	Set 2	Set 3	Report
27 July	19:30	Akane Yamaguchi (Japan)	2–0	(Myanmar) Thet Htar Thuzar	21–12	21–10		Report
29 July	19:30	Michelle Li (Canada)	2–0	(Myanmar) Thet Htar Thuzar	21–16	25–23		Report
31 July	08:30	Akane Yamaguchi (Japan)	2–1	(Canada) Michelle Li	22–24	21–17	21–12	Report

=== Group D ===
Pos	Team	Pld	W	L	GF	GA	GD	PF	PA	PD	Pts	Qualification
1	Supanida Katethong (THA)	2	2	0	4	0	+4	84	58	+26	2	Round of 16
2	Juliana Viana Vieira (BRA)	2	1	1	2	2	0	77	75	+2	1	
3	Lo Sin Yan (HKG)	2	0	2	0	4	−4	56	84	−28	0	

Source: Olympics

Date	Time	Player 1	Score	Player 2	Set 1	Set 2	Set 3	Report
27 July	14:50	Supanida Katethong (Thailand)	2–0	(Brazil) Juliana Viana Vieira	21–16	21–19		Report
29 July	14:50	Lo Sin Yan (Hong Kong)	0–2	(Brazil) Juliana Viana Vieira	19–21	14–21		Report
30 July	20:20	Supanida Katethong (Thailand)	2–0	(Hong Kong) Lo Sin Yan	21–14	21–9		Report

=== Group E ===
Pos	Team	Pld	W	L	GF	GA	GD	PF	PA	PD	Pts	Qualification
1	Ratchanok Intanon (THA)	2	2	0	4	0	+4	84	50	+34	2	Quarter-finals
2	Tai Tzu-ying (TPE)	2	1	1	2	2	0	76	71	+5	1	
3	Lianne Tan (BEL)	2	0	2	0	4	−4	45	84	−39	0	

Source: Olympics

Date	Time	Player 1	Score	Player 2	Set 1	Set 2	Set 3	Report
28 July	09:20	Tai Tzu-ying (Chinese Taipei)	2–0	(Belgium) Lianne Tan	21–15	21–14		Report
30 July	08:30	Ratchanok Intanon (Thailand)	2–0	(Belgium) Lianne Tan	21–8	21–8		Report
31 July	14:50	Tai Tzu-ying (Chinese Taipei)	0–2	(Thailand) Ratchanok Intanon	19–21	15–21		Report

=== Group G ===
Pos	Team	Pld	W	L	GF	GA	GD	PF	PA	PD	Pts	Qualification
1	Gregoria Mariska Tunjung (INA)	2	2	0	4	0	+4	84	55	+29	2	Round of 16
2	Polina Buhrova (UKR)	2	1	1	2	3	−1	86	100	−14	1	
3	Tereza Švábíková (CZE)	2	0	2	1	4	−3	88	103	−15	0	

Source: Olympics

Date	Time	Player 1	Score	Player 2	Set 1	Set 2	Set 3	Report
28 July	14:50	Gregoria Mariska Tunjung (Indonesia)	2–0	(Ukraine) Polina Buhrova	21–10	21–15		Report
30 July	11:00	Tereza Švábíková (Czech Republic)	1–2	(Ukraine) Polina Buhrova	19–21	21–19	18–21	Report
31 July	15:40	Gregoria Mariska Tunjung (Indonesia)	2–0	(Czech Republic) Tereza Švábíková	21–12	21–18		Report

=== Group H ===
Pos	Team	Pld	W	L	GF	GA	GD	PF	PA	PD	Pts	Qualification
1	Kim Ga-eun (KOR)	2	2	0	4	1	+3	106	78	+28	2	Round of 16
2	Goh Jin Wei (MAS)	2	1	1	3	2	+1	104	96	+8	1	
3	Johanita Scholtz (RSA)	2	0	2	0	4	−4	50	86	−36	0	

Source: Olympics

Date	Time	Player 1	Score	Player 2	Set 1	Set 2	Set 3	Report
27 July	14:50	Kim Ga-eun (South Korea)	2–0	(South Africa) Johanita Scholtz	21–12	21–6		Report
29 July	14:50	Goh Jin Wei (Malaysia)	2–0	(South Africa) Johanita Scholtz	23–21	21–11		Report
31 July	08:30	Kim Ga-eun (South Korea)	2–1	(Malaysia) Goh Jin Wei	21–17	20–22	23–21	Report

=== Group I ===
Pos	Team	Pld	W	L	GF	GA	GD	PF	PA	PD	Pts	Qualification
1	Yeo Jia Min (SGP)	2	2	0	4	0	+4	84	33	+51	2	Round of 16
2	Kate Foo Kune (MRI)	2	1	1	2	2	0	60	58	+2	1	
3	Dorsa Yavarivafa (EOR)	2	0	2	0	4	−4	31	84	−53	0	

Source: Olympics

Date	Time	Player 1	Score	Player 2	Set 1	Set 2	Set 3	Report
27 July	09:20	Yeo Jia Min (Singapore)	2–0	Dorsa Yavarivafa	21–7	21–8		Report
29 July	11:00	Kate Foo Kune (Mauritius)	2–0	Dorsa Yavarivafa	21–5	21–11		Report
30 July	20:20	Yeo Jia Min (Singapore)	2–0	(Mauritius) Kate Foo Kune	21–12	21–6		Report

=== Group J ===
Pos	Team	Pld	W	L	GF	GA	GD	PF	PA	PD	Pts	Qualification
1	Aya Ohori (JPN)	2	2	0	4	0	+4	84	36	+48	2	Round of 16
2	Neslihan Arın (TUR)	2	1	1	2	2	0	58	75	−17	1	
3	Inés Castillo (PER)	2	0	2	0	4	−4	53	84	−31	0	

Source: Olympics

Date	Time	Player 1	Score	Player 2	Set 1	Set 2	Set 3	Report
28 July	11:00	Aya Ohori (Japan)	2–0	(Turkey) Neslihan Arın	21–9	21–7		Report
30 July	9:20	Inés Castillo (Peru)	0–2	(Turkey) Neslihan Arın	16–21	17–21		Report
31 July	15:40	Aya Ohori (Japan)	2–0	(Peru) Inés Castillo	21–12	21–8		Report

=== Group K ===
Pos	Team	Pld	W	L	GF	GA	GD	PF	PA	PD	Pts	Qualification
1	Beiwen Zhang (USA)	2	2	0	4	0	+4	86	53	+33	2	Round of 16
2	Nguyễn Thùy Linh (VIE)	2	1	1	2	2	0	82	53	+29	1	
3	Tiffany Ho (AUS)	2	0	2	0	4	−4	22	84	−62	0	

Source: Olympics

Date	Time	Player 1	Score	Player 2	Set 1	Set 2	Set 3	Report
27 July	19:30	Beiwen Zhang (United States)	2–0	(Australia) Tiffany Ho	21–9	21–4		Report
29 July	21:10	Nguyễn Thùy Linh (Vietnam)	2–0	(Australia) Tiffany Ho	21–6	21–3		Report
31 July	08:30	Beiwen Zhang (United States)	2–0	(Vietnam) Nguyễn Thùy Linh	22–20	22–20		Report

=== Group L ===
Pos	Team	Pld	W	L	GF	GA	GD	PF	PA	PD	Pts	Qualification
1	Carolina Marín (ESP)	2	2	0	4	0	+4	84	40	+44	2	Round of 16
2	Jenjira Stadelmann (SUI)	2	1	1	2	3	−1	88	100	−12	1	
3	Rachael Darragh (IRL)	2	0	2	1	4	−3	68	100	−32	0	

Source: Olympics

Date	Time	Player 1	Score	Player 2	Set 1	Set 2	Set 3	Report
28 July	19:30	Carolina Marín (Spain)	2–0	(Switzerland) Jenjira Stadelmann	21–11	21–19		Report
30 July	16:30	Rachael Darragh (Republic of Ireland)	1–2	(Switzerland) Jenjira Stadelmann	21–13	22–24	15–21	Report
31 July	14:00	Carolina Marín (Spain)	2–0	(Republic of Ireland) Rachael Darragh	21–5	21–5		Report

=== Group M ===
Pos	Team	Pld	W	L	GF	GA	GD	PF	PA	PD	Pts	Qualification
1	P. V. Sindhu (IND)	2	2	0	4	0	+4	84	30	+54	2	Round of 16
2	Kristin Kuuba (EST)	2	1	1	2	2	0	57	58	−1	1	
3	Fathimath Nabaaha Abdul Razzaq (MDV)	2	0	2	0	4	−4	31	84	−53	0	

Source: Olympics

Date	Time	Player 1	Score	Player 2	Set 1	Set 2	Set 3	Report
28 July	09:20	P. V. Sindhu (India)	2–0	(Maldives) Fathimath Nabaaha Abdul Razzaq	21–9	21–6		Report
30 July	08:30	Kristin Kuuba (Estonia)	2–0	(Maldives) Fathimath Nabaaha Abdul Razzaq	21–7	21–9		Report
31 July	09:20	P. V. Sindhu (India)	2–0	(Estonia) Kristin Kuuba	21–5	21–10		Report

=== Group N ===
Pos	Team	Pld	W	L	GF	GA	GD	PF	PA	PD	Pts	Qualification
1	He Bingjiao (CHN)	2	2	0	4	0	+4	87	45	+42	2	Round of 16
2	Kirsty Gilmour (GBR)	2	1	1	2	2	0	72	69	+3	1	
3	Keisha Fatimah Azzahra (AZE)	2	0	2	0	4	−4	39	84	−45	0	

Source: Olympics

Date	Time	Player 1	Score	Player 2	Set 1	Set 2	Set 3	Report
27 July	08:30	He Bingjiao (China)	2–0	(Azerbaijan) Keisha Fatimah Azzahra	21–8	21–7		Report
29 July	08:30	Kirsty Gilmour (United Kingdom)	2–0	(Azerbaijan) Keisha Fatimah Azzahra	21–13	21–11		Report
30 July	19:30	He Bingjiao (China)	2–0	(United Kingdom) Kirsty Gilmour	24–22	21–8		Report

=== Group P ===
Pos	Team	Pld	W	L	GF	GA	GD	PF	PA	PD	Pts	Qualification
1	Chen Yufei (CHN)	2	2	0	4	2	+2	120	84	+36	2	Quarter-finals
2	Mia Blichfeldt (DEN)	2	1	1	3	3	0	96	108	−12	1	
3	Yvonne Li (GER)	2	0	2	2	4	−2	91	115	−24	0	

Source: Olympics

Date	Time	Player 1	Score	Player 2	Set 1	Set 2	Set 3	Report
28 July	14:50	Chen Yufei (China)	2–1	(Germany) Yvonne Li	21–14	17–21	21–9	Report
30 July	14:50	Mia Blichfeldt (Denmark)	2–1	(Germany) Yvonne Li	21–14	14–21	21–12	Report
31 July	19:30	Chen Yufei (China)	2–1	(Denmark) Mia Blichfeldt	21–8	19–21	21–11	Report

== Knockout stage ==
Round of 16
C1	Akane Yamaguchi (JPN)	21	21
D1	Supanida Katethong (THA)	6	13
G1	Gregoria Mariska Tunjung (INA)	21	8	23
H1	Kim Ga-eun (KOR)	4	21	21
I1	Yeo Jia Min (SGP)	21	14	22
J1	Aya Ohori (JPN)	11	21	24
K1	Beiwen Zhang (USA)	21	9	18
L1	Carolina Marín (ESP)	12	21	21
M1	P. V. Sindhu (IND)	19	14
N1	He Bingjiao (CHN)	21	21

Quarter-finals
A1	An Se-young (KOR)	15	21	21
C1	Akane Yamaguchi (JPN)	21	17	8
E1	Ratchanok Intanon (THA)	23	9
G1	Gregoria Mariska Tunjung (INA)	25	21
J1	Aya Ohori (JPN)	13	14
L1	Carolina Marín (ESP)	21	21
N1	He Bingjiao (CHN)	21	21
P1	Chen Yufei (CHN)	16	17

Semi-finals
A1	An Se-young (KOR)	11	21	21
G1	Gregoria Mariska Tunjung (INA)	21	13	16
L1	Carolina Marín (ESP)	21	10^{r}
N1	He Bingjiao (CHN)	14	8

Gold medal match
A1	An Se-young (KOR)	21	21
N1	He Bingjiao (CHN)	13	16
Bronze medal match
G1	Gregoria Mariska Tunjung (INA)	w	/	o^{(Note: Marín retired from the competition after suffering an injury in the semi-final.)}
L1	Carolina Marín (ESP)
