= Mauritius at the Olympics =

- IOC code: MRI
- NOC: Mauritius Olympic Committee
- Medals Ranked 151st: Gold 0 Silver 0 Bronze 1 Total 1

Summer appearances
- 1984; 1988; 1992; 1996; 2000; 2004; 2008; 2012; 2016; 2020; 2024; 2028

Mauritius first participated at the Olympic Games in 1984, and has sent athletes to compete in every Summer Olympic Games since then. The nation has never participated in the Winter Olympic Games. Mauritius also supported the American-led boycott of the 1980 Summer Olympics in Moscow.

At the 2008 Beijing Olympic Games, Bruno Julie secured Mauritius' first Olympic medal by reaching the bantamweight boxing semifinals and earning the bronze medal.

The National Olympic Committee for Mauritius was founded in 1971 by Ram Ruhee, who remained its Secretary General until his death in 2008. It was officially recognized by the International Olympic Committee in 1972.

== Medals tables ==
=== Medals by Summer Games ===
Games	Athletes	Gold	Silver	Bronze	Total	Rank
1984 Los Angeles	4	0	0	0	0	–
1988 Seoul	8	0	0	0	0	–
1992 Barcelona	13	0	0	0	0	–
1996 Atlanta	26	0	0	0	0	–
2000 Sydney	20	0	0	0	0	–
2004 Athens	9	0	0	0	0	–
2008 Beijing	12	0	0	1	1	80
2012 London	11	0	0	0	0	–
2016 Rio de Janeiro	12	0	0	0	0	–
2020 Tokyo	8	0	0	0	0	–
2024 Paris	13	0	0	0	0	–
2028 Los Angeles	future event					
2032 Brisbane	future event					
Total		0	0	1	1	151

=== Medals by sport ===
Sport	Gold	Silver	Bronze	Total
Boxing	0	0	1	1
Totals (1 entries)	0	0	1	1

== List of medalists ==
Medal	Name	Games	Sport	Event
Bronze	Bruno Julie	2008 Beijing	Boxing	Bantamweight

== See also ==
- List of flag bearers for Mauritius at the Olympics
- Category:Olympic competitors for Mauritius
- Mauritius at the Paralympics
