= Ram Ruhee =

Ram Ruhee (October 12, 1927 – October 21, 2008) was a Mauritian former International Olympic Committee member and FIFA executive. Ruhee founded the Mauritius National Olympic Committee and remained it Secretary General until his death in 2008.

== Early years ==
Ruhee, born in Port Louis and former teacher, founded the first division soccer club Cadets Club in Mauritius in 1948. He continued to manage the team after its founding. He later founded the Mauritius National Olympic Committee in 1971 and remained its Secretary General until his death in 2008.

== Career ==
Mauritius first competed in the Olympics during the 1984 Summer Olympics in Los Angeles and has subsequently competed in every Summer Olympics Game since. The country's first Olympic Medal was won during the 2008 Beijing Olympics by Bruno Julie. The IOC would later commend Ruhee in statement following his death saying, "(He) played a key role in promoting the values of sport to the youth in his country."

Ruhee served as a member of the International Olympic Committee from 1988 until 2007. He was investigated in 1999 as part of the 2002 Winter Olympic bid scandal. However, Ruhee was completely exonerated and cleared of any wrongdoing in the scandal. He was awarded the Olympic Order of Merit at the Beijing Olympics in 2008.

Ruhee also served on the FIFA executive committee from 1992 until 1998. He was also a member of the FIFA finance committee and the FIFA World Cup Organising Committee.

== Death ==
Ram Ruhee died on October 21, 2008, at the age of 81 after a long illness.
