= Hamid Ait Bighrade =

Moroccan boxer

Personal information
- Nationality: Moroccan
- Born: حميد ايت بيغراد; May 13, 1976 (age 50)
- Height: 5 ft 5 in (1.65 m)
- Weight: Bantamweight

Boxing career

Hamid Ait Bighrade (born May 13, 1976) is a Moroccan boxer who competed at the 2004 Summer Olympics in Athens.

Ait Bighade qualified himself for boxing at the 2004 Summer Olympics by taking the gold medal at the 2nd AIBA African 2004 Olympic Qualifying Tournament in Gaborone, Botswana defeating Ethiopia's Abel Aferalign.

Ait Bighrade fought as a bantamweight in the 2004 Olympics. He lost in the first round in a 25–17 decision against India's Diwakar Prasad.
