= Mauritius at the 2020 Summer Olympics =

- IOC code: MRI
- NOC: Mauritius Olympic Committee

in Tokyo, Japan July 23, 2021 – August 8, 2021
- Competitors: 8 in 6 sports
- Flag bearers (opening): Richarno Colin; Roilya Ranaivosoa
- Flag bearer (closing): N/A
- Medals: Gold 0 Silver 0 Bronze 0 Total 0

Summer Olympics appearances (overview)
- 1984; 1988; 1992; 1996; 2000; 2004; 2008; 2012; 2016; 2020; 2024

Mauritius competed at the 2020 Summer Olympics in Tokyo. Originally scheduled to take place from 24 July to 9 August 2020, the Games were postponed to 23 July to 8 August 2021, because of the COVID-19 pandemic. It was the nation's tenth consecutive appearance at the Summer Olympics.

== Competitors ==
The following is the list of number of competitors in the Games.

Sport	Men	Women	Total
Athletics	1	0	1
Badminton	1	0	1
Boxing	2	0	2
Judo	1	0	1
Swimming	1	1	2
Weightlifting	0	1	1
Total	6	2	8

== Athletics ==
Mauritius received a universality slot from the World Athletics to send a male track and field athlete to the Olympics.

Key

- Note–Ranks given for track events are within the athlete's heat only
- Q = Qualified for the next round
- q = Qualified for the next round as a fastest loser or, in field events, by position without achieving the qualifying target
- NR = National record
- N/A = Round not applicable for the event
- Bye = Athlete not required to compete in round

Track & road events

Athlete	Event	Heat		Semifinal		Final	
Athlete	Event	Result	Rank	Result	Rank	Result	Rank
Jérémie Lararaudeuse	Men's 110 m hurdles	14.03	7	Did not advance			

== Badminton ==
Mauritius entered one badminton player into the Olympic tournament. Two-time African champion Julien Paul secured a place in the men's singles as the highest-ranked badminton player vying for qualification from his respective continent in the men's singles based on the BWF World Race to Tokyo Rankings.

Athlete	Event	Group stage			Elimination	Quarterfinal	Semifinal	Final / BM	
Athlete	Event	Opposition Score	Opposition Score	Rank	Opposition Score	Opposition Score	Opposition Score	Opposition Score	Rank
Julien Paul	Men's singles	Tsuneyama (JPN); L (8–21, 6–21)	Coelho (BRA); L (5–21, 16–21)	3	Did not advance				

== Boxing ==
Mauritius entered two boxers into the Olympic tournament. Two-time Olympian Richarno Colin scored an outright semifinal victory to secure a spot in the men's lightweight division at the 2020 African Qualification Tournament in Diamniadio, Senegal. Rio 2016 Olympian Merven Clair completed the nation's boxing lineup by topping the list of eligible boxers from Africa in the men's welterweight division of the IOC's Boxing Task Force Rankings.

Athlete	Event	Round of 32	Round of 16	Quarterfinals	Semifinals	Final	
Athlete	Event	Opposition Result	Opposition Result	Opposition Result	Opposition Result	Opposition Result	Rank
Richarno Colin	Men's lightweight	Nadir (MAR); W 4–1	Mamedov (ROC); L 0–5	Did not advance			
Merven Clair	Men's welterweight	Sanford (CAN); W 5–0	Ishaish (JOR); W 3–2	Walsh (IRL); L 1–4	Did not advance		

== Judo ==
Mauritius qualified one judoka for the men's middleweight category (90 kg) at the Games. Rémi Feuillet accepted a continental berth from Africa as the nation's top-ranked judoka outside of direct qualifying position in the IJF World Ranking List of June 28, 2021.

Athlete	Event	Round of 64	Round of 32	Round of 16	Quarterfinals	Semifinals	Repechage	Final / BM	
Athlete	Event	Opposition Result	Opposition Result	Opposition Result	Opposition Result	Opposition Result	Opposition Result	Opposition Result	Rank
Rémi Feuillet	Men's −90 kg	Bye	Mukai (JPN); L 00–10	Did not advance					

== Swimming ==
Mauritius received a universality invitation from FINA to send two top-ranked swimmers (one per gender) in their respective individual events to the Olympics, based on the FINA Points System of June 28, 2021.

Athlete	Event	Heat		Semifinal		Final	
Athlete	Event	Time	Rank	Time	Rank	Time	Rank
Mathieu Marquet	Men's 100 m freestyle	53.56	60	Did not advance			
Alicia Kok Shun	Women's 100 m breaststroke	1:15.42	38	Did not advance			

== Weightlifting ==
Mauritius entered one female weightlifter into the Olympic competition. Roilya Ranaivosoa topped the list of weightlifters from Africa in the women's 49 kg category based on the IWF Absolute Continental Rankings.

Athlete	Event	Snatch		Clean & Jerk		Total	Rank
Athlete	Event	Result	Rank	Result	Rank	Total	Rank
Roilya Ranaivosoa	Women's –49 kg	73	12	91	11	164	11
