= Michael Medor =

Mauritian boxer (born 1982)

Personal information
- Full name: Michael Medor
- Nationality: Mauritius
- Born: 23 May 1982 (age 44) Port Louis, Mauritius
- Height: 1.70 m (5 ft 7 in)
- Weight: 60 kg (132 lb)

Sport
- Sport: Boxing
- Weight class: Lightweight

Michael Medor (born 23 May 1982 in Port Louis) is an amateur Mauritian lightweight boxer. Medor qualified for the Mauritian squad in the men's lightweight division (60 kg) at the 2004 Summer Olympics in Athens after claiming the title and receiving a berth from the second AIBA African Olympic Qualifying Tournament in Gaborone, Botswana. He lost the opening match to Mongolia's Uranchimegiin Mönkh-Erdene in the preliminary round of thirty-two with a scoring decision of 23–29. Medor was also appointed as the Mauritian flag bearer by the National Olympic Committee in the opening ceremony.

Olympic Games
Preceded by Michael Macaque	Flagbearer for Mauritius; Athens 2004	Succeeded by Stéphan Buckland
