= Nathalie Lam =

Mauritian swimmer

Personal information
- Full name: King-Teng "Nathalie" Lam
- Born: 7 March 1973 (age 53)

Sport
- Sport: Swimming

King-Teng "Nathalie" Lam (born 7 March 1973) is a Mauritian swimmer. She competed in the women's 4 × 100 metre freestyle relay event at the 1992 Summer Olympics.
