= Luanne Maurice =

Mauritian swimmer

Personal information
- Born: 3 August 1972 (age 53)

Sport
- Sport: Swimming

Luanne Maurice (born 3 August 1972) is a Mauritian swimmer. She competed in the women's 4 × 100 metre freestyle relay event at the 1992 Summer Olympics.
