= Dorsa Yavarivafa =

Iranian badminton player (born 2003)

Personal information
- Born: 31 July 2003 (age 22) Tehran, Iran
- Height: 1.65 m (5 ft 5 in)

Sport
- Sport: Badminton
- Handedness: Right
- Event: Women's singles

Women's singles
- BWF profile

Dorsa Yavarivafa OLY (Persian: درسا یاوری‌وفا; born 31 July 2003) is an Iranian badminton player who competed for the Refugee Olympic Team at the 2024 Summer Olympics.

== Biography ==
Introduced to badminton by her father when she was nine-years-old, Yavarivafa left Iran aged 15 along with her mother.

Using fake German passports, they fled the country in November 2018 because her mother wanted to change her religion and Yavarivafa had repeatedly been rejected by the national badminton team without being told why. Her father, who sells car parts, stayed in Iran in case his wife and daughter needed to go back.

Starting in Turkey then moving on to Germany, Belgium and France, Yavarivafa and her mother eventually arrived in England at the end of 2019.

Having been given permission to stay in the country, she initially lived in Birmingham before moving to London. There she was introduced to former badminton player now Athletes’ Department Director at the International Olympic Committee (IOC), Kaveh Mehrabi, who suggested she could become part of the Refugee Olympic Team.

In June 2023, she was awarded an IOC Refugee Scholarship. The funding helped Yavarivafa compete in several international tournaments and on 2 May 2024, she was among 36 athletes named in the 2024 Refugee Olympic Team.

At the Paris Olympics, she was eliminated in the group stages after losing both her matches in straight sets to 13th seed Yeo Jia Min from Singapore and Kate Ludik of Mauritius.

Alongside her badminton training at the Sankey Academy in Milton Keynes, Yavarivafa is studying sports and exercise science at Middlesex University.
