= Dominique Béchard =

Mauritian athlete (born 1963)

Personal information
- Nationality: Mauritian
- Born: 21 October 1963 (age 62) Curepipe, Mauritius
- Height: 1.98 m (6 ft 6 in)
- Weight: 115 kg (254 lb)

Sport
- Sport: Athletics, Basketball, Rugby
- Events: Discus throw Hammer throw

Dominique Béchard (born 21 October 1963) is a Mauritian athlete. He competed in the men's discus throw and the men's hammer throw at the 1984 Summer Olympics. He also represented Mauritius in Basketball and Rugby from 1989 to 1995
