= Annabelle Mariejeanne =

Mauritian swimmer

Personal information
- Born: 9 October 1976 (age 49)

Sport
- Sport: Swimming

Annabelle Mariejeanne (born 9 October 1976) is a Mauritian swimmer. She competed in the women's 4 × 100 metre freestyle relay event at the 1992 Summer Olympics.
