= Sheila Seebaluck =

Mauritian middle-distance runner

Personal information
- Nationality: Mauritian
- Born: 13 December 1964 (age 61)

Sport
- Sport: Middle-distance running
- Event: 800 metres
Medal record
Women's athletics
Representing Mauritius
African Championships
Bronze medal – third place	1988 Annaba	800 m
Bronze medal – third place	1990 Cairo	4×400 m
Bronze medal – third place	1992 Belle Vue Harel	4×400 m

Sheila Seebaluck (born 13 December 1964) is a Mauritian middle-distance runner. She competed in the women's 800 metres at the 1988 Summer Olympics.
