= Daniel André =

Mauritian sprinter (1965–2022)

Personal information
- Full name: Jean Daniel André
- Nationality: Mauritian
- Born: 12 September 1965
- Died: 22 September 2022 (aged 57)

Sport
- Sport: Sprinting
- Event: 100 metres

Jean Daniel André (12 September 1965 – 22 September 2022) was a Mauritian sprinter. He competed in the men's 100 metres at the 1984 Summer Olympics.
