= David Carver (athlete) =

Mauritian long-distance runner

Personal information
- Born: 5 September 1987 (age 38)
- Height: 183 cm (6 ft 0 in)
- Weight: 68 kg (150 lb)

Sport
- Country: Mauritius
- Sport: Athletics
- Event: 1500 m – marathon

Achievements and titles
- Personal bests: 1500 m – 3:54.02 (2011); 5000 m – 14:40.9 (2011); Mar – 2:18:20 (2016)

David Carver (born 5 September 1987) is a Mauritian runner who specialises in the marathon. He placed 102nd at the 2016 Olympics and 61st at the 2017 World Championships.
