= Lalaina Rabenarivo =

Malagasy boxer (born 1978)

Personal information
- Nationality: Malagasy
- Born: 8 August 1978 (age 47) Madagascar
- Height: 160 cm (5 ft 3 in)
- Weight: 48 kg (106 lb)

Sport
- Country: Madagascar
- Sport: Boxing
Medal record
African Championships
Silver medal – second place	2007 Antananarivo	Light flyweight
Indian Ocean Island Games
Gold medal – first place	2007 Antananarivo	Light flyweight
Gold medal – first place	2011 Victoria	Light flyweight
Silver medal – second place	2015 Saint-Pierre	Light flyweight
Zone 7 African Championships
Gold medal – first place	2007 Antananarivo	Light flyweight

Lalaina Rabenarivo (born 8 August 1978) is a Malagasy amateur boxer. He represented his country in the light flyweight class at the 2004 Summer Olympics. He lost his initial bout against South Korean boxer Hong Moo-won.
