= Stéphan Buckland =

Mauritian sprinter (born 1977)

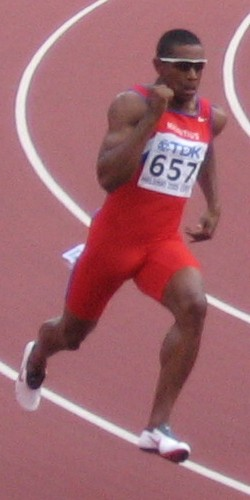
- Buckland at the 2005 World Championships

Personal information
- Nationality: Mauritian
- Born: 12 January 1977 (age 49) Floreal, Plaines Wilhems, Mauritius

Sport
- Sport: Running
- Events: 100 metres, 200 metres
Medal record
Men's athletics
Representing Mauritius
African Championships in Athletics
| Silver medal – second place | 2000 Algiers | 100 m |
| Silver medal – second place | 2000 Algiers | 4×100 m |
| Silver medal – second place | 2006 Bambous | 200 m |
| Silver medal – second place | 2008 Addis Ababa | 200 m |
Commonwealth Games
| Silver medal – second place | 2006 Melbourne | 200 m |
IAAF World Athletics Final
| Gold medal – first place | 2008 Stuttgart | 200 m |
| Bronze medal – third place | 2003 Monaco | 200 m |
| Bronze medal – third place | 2004 Monaco | 200 m |
Francophone Games
| Gold medal – first place | 2001 Ottawa | 100 m |
| Gold medal – first place | 2001 Ottawa | 200 m |
| Gold medal – first place | 2001 Ottawa | 4×100 m |
| Silver medal – second place | 2009 Beirut | 200 m |
| Silver medal – second place | 2009 Beirut | 4×100 m |
Indian Ocean Island Games
| Gold medal – first place | 2003 Reduit | 100 m |
| Gold medal – first place | 2003 Reduit | 200 m |
| Gold medal – first place | 2003 Reduit | 4×100 m |
| Silver medal – second place | 1998 Seychelles | 100 m |

Stéphan Buckland (also written Stéphane Buckland; born 12 January 1977) is a Mauritian retired track and field athlete who competed in the 100 and 200 metres.

== Biography ==
Buckland's international career began in 1998 after joining the IAAF High Performance Training Centre in Dakar, Senegal. Under coach Dr Herve Stephan, he has progressed to be ready in participating in many international world class track and field meetings. In 1999, he competed in several meetings in Italy and France. He ran a season best and personal best of 10.22 at the Meeting of La Roche Sur Yon in France which at that time was also a national record for Mauritius and eventually achieved the qualifying standards to enter the 100m event at the IAAF World Athletics Championships in Sevilla, Spain. At these Championships, he reached the quarterfinals by finishing fifth in 10.39. After these Championships, he reached the final of the 100m at the All Africa Games finishing last and taking fifth place in the 4 × 100 m relay.

In 2000, Buckland broke his 100 record three times, running 10.16 at the Meeting Internacional Atletismo Funchal in Funchal, Portugal. In Funchal, Buckland also ran a national record of 20.31 smashing the former Mauritian record of 20.72 held by Eric Milazar. Earlier that year, he ran his first official 200m race at the Mauritian International Meeting and broke the meeting record as well as the national record with a time of 20.66. He ran a meeting record of 20.43 in the 200m at the Meeting Atletica Internazionale Barletta, which he still holds today. He also won the 100m in 10.29 at this meeting. Other performances include two silver medals at the African Athletics Championships, taking second places in the 100m in 10.20 and the 4 × 100 m relay. His major breakthrough that year was his amazing performance at the Sydney Olympic Games in Australia. He reached the quarterfinals of the 100m by winning his heat in 10.35. He impressed many again by reaching the 200m semifinal finishing fifth in 20.56 and missing the final by a couple of milliseconds. After this performance, Buckland decided to focus mainly on the 200m event and continued to specialize in it.

In 2001, Buckland became the first athlete in history to win the 100m, 200m and the 4 × 100 m relay at the Francophone Games in Ottawa, Canada. In the 100m, he beat Canadian Bruny Surin, one of the fastest man on Earth, in a time of 10.13, setting a new national record. He then won the 200m final in 20.33 after winning his qualification and semifinal races in 20.62 and 20.66 respectively. He then anchored the Mauritian relay team to gold with a new national record of 39.04. What followed was even better. At the IAAF World Athletics Championships in Edmonton, Canada, Stephan Buckland reached the final for the first time finishing sixth in 20.24. He broke the national record in his quarterfinal race running 20.23 and then again the following day, in his semifinal race with a time of 20.15. He also reached the semifinal of the 4 × 100 m relay with Eric Milazar, Fernando Augustin, and Arnaud Casquette by setting a new national record of 38.99 seconds. With all these amazing performances, many Mauritians had found their new national hero and Buckland was given an honourable welcome after his return from Edmonton. Together with Eric Milazar, who finished fourth in the 400m at the World Championships, they were congratulated by the Prime Minister and treated with a parade in Port Louis. His performance also gave him entry to many Golden League competitions in Europe. He finished seventh at the Weltklasse Golden League in Zurich, Switzerland and again at the Memorial Van Damme Golden League in Bruxelles, Belgium, in times of 20.63 and 20.42 respectively. He was also selected to represent Mauritius at the Goodwill Games in Brisbane, Australia where he took seventh place in 20.92. He ended his season by running his first 300m race at the Apres Midi Des Stars Meeting Reduit, taking second place and beaten by compatriot Eric Milazar. This race was more of a treat for the public who came in large numbers to see the island's two best athletes square off.

In 2002, Buckland was haunted by injuries and had to end his season prematurely. He equalled his national record of 10.13 at the Mauritius International Meeting on home soil and went on to participate in many European competitions. He took fifth place at the Golden Gala Golden League Meeting in Rome and took fourth place at the Athens Grand Prix in Greece in a season's best of 20.31. He participated at the Commonwealth Games in Manchester, England and won his 200 heat in 20.91 and his quarterfinal race in 20.77. He was injured in the semifinal and finished sixth in 20.61 and unable to reach the final although he was a serious medal contender. This injury also disabled him from competing at the African Athletics Championships in Tunisia where compatriot Eric Milazar won the 400m.

In 2003, Buckland bounced back at the international scene where he took third place in the 200m at the Rome Golden League in 20.48. He then won the 200m at the KBC Night of Athletics, Belgium in a time of 20.33. He finished second at the Athens Grand Prix in 20.32. Other performances include fourth place at the Gaz de France Golden League in Paris, France in 20.42. He was then promoted to third place after the disqualification of an American athlete due to doping. At the Meeting International Resisprint, Buckland won the 200m in 20.29, a new meeting record which he still holds today. At the 2003 9th IAAF World Athletics Championships, Buckland reached the final for the second time finishing fifth in 20.41. He broke the national record in the quarterfinal, running 20.06 seconds, making him the third fastest 200m sprinter on the African continent. He also ran 20.11 in his semifinal race finishing second behind American Darvis Patton and automatically qualified for the final. After his return from the World Championships, Buckland participated at the Indian Ocean Island Games where he won three gold medals in the 100m (10.60), the 200m (20.64) and 4 × 100 m relay (39.23). He broke the Games record in the 200m qualification in 20.46, a record that still holds today as well as in the 4 × 100 m relay where he anchored to 39.23. After the Games, Buckland was selected by the IAAF to participate at the first IAAF World Athletics Final, the second most important athletics competition in the world. This competition was held in Monte Carlo, Monaco. He took the bronze medal in the 200m finishing third in 20.44 and received the IAAF certificate of honour for being among the 10 best 200m athlete in the world.

Buckland is one of the few athletes who has reached the IAAF World Championships in Athletics 200 m final three times consecutively. He did so in 2001, 2003, and 2005. Buckland's international career started in 1999 where he participated in the 1999 World Championships in Athletics held in Sevilla, Spain. After winning numerous international meetings in 2000, he went on to represent Mauritius at the Sydney Olympic Games where he finished fifth in his semifinal race in 20.56. He was also a 100m quarterfinalist at these Olympics. In 2001, Buckland won three gold medals at the Francophone Games held in Ottawa, Ontario, Canada. In 2003, Buckland established a new national record in the 200m with a time of 20.06 in the quarterfinal race at the 2003 IAAF World Championships in Athletics in Paris, France. Buckland came sixth in the 200m final at the 2004 Summer Olympics. In 2006, Buckland won a silver medal in the 200m at the Commonwealth Games in Melbourne, Australia. He went on to represent Mauritius at the 2008 Summer Olympics in Beijing. He competed at the 200 metres where he placed third in his first round heat in a time of 20.98 seconds. He improved his time in the second round to 20.37 seconds, but only finished fifth in his heat. His time was still enough to advance to the semifinals, but he was unable to make it to the finals. In his semifinal race he placed sixth with a time of 20.48 seconds.

In 2008, Stéphan Buckland won the 200m at the IAAF World Athletics Final held in Stuttgart, Germany. To qualify for this prestigious competition, athletes must gain enough points and be among the top eight in the event in the IAAF World Athletics Tour.

In the last decades, Stéphane Buckland proved to be the most prolific athlete for the Mauritian Flag.

== Personal Bests ==
| Date | Event | Venue | seconds) |
|---|---|---|---|
| 23 February 2004 | 60 metres | Budapest, Hungary | 6.72 |
| 21 July 2001, 21 April 2002 | 100 metres | Ottawa, Canada | 10.13 (National record) |
| 19 January 2008 | 150 metres | Reduit, Mauritius | 15.47 (National record) |
| 27 August 2003 | 200 metres | Paris, France | 20.06 (National record) |

== Prize Money Earned from Most Important Competitions ==
| Year | Competition | Venue | Event(s) | Results | Time | Prize money (US $ Dollars) |
|---|---|---|---|---|---|---|
| 2001 | IAAF World Athletics Championships | Edmonton, Canada | 200m | 6th | 20.24 | $6,000 |
| 2003 | IAAF World Athletics Championships | Paris, France | 200m | 5th | 20.41 | $10,000 |
| 2003 | IAAF World Athletics Final | Monte Carlo, Monaco | 200m | 3rd | 20.44 | $12,000 |
| 2004 | IAAF World Athletics Final | Monte Carlo, Monaco | 200m | 3rd | 20.41 | $12,000 |
| 2005 | IAAF World Athletics Championships | Paris, France | 200m | 5th | 20.41 | $10,000 |
| 2005 | IAAF World Athletics Final | Monte Carlo, Monaco | 200m | 5th | 20.64 | $5,000 |
| 2006 | IAAF World Cup in Athletics | Athens, Greece | 200m, 4 × 100 m | 8th, 5th | 20.96. 38.87 | $1000 + $6000 |
| 2008 | IAAF Grand Prix Zagreb | Zagreb, Croatia | 100m, 200m | 7th, 1st | 10.65, 20.57 | $700 + $4000 |
| 2008 | IAAF World Athletics Final | Stuttgart, Germany | 200m | 1st | 20.57 | $30,000 |
| 2009 | IAAF World Athletics Final | Thessaloniki, Greece | 200m | 4th | 20.75 | $7,000 |

== IAAF World rankings ==
| Year | Month | Event | Ranking | Points |
|---|---|---|---|---|
| 2000 | December | 100m | 36th | 1206 |
| 2000 | December | 200m | 38th | 1188 |
| 2001 | December | 100m | 34th | 1200 |
| 2001 | December | 200m | 8th | 1284 |
| 2002 | December | 200m | 15th | 1216 |
| 2003 | December | 200m | 4th | 1308 |
| 2004 | June | 200m | 3rd | 1308 |
| 2004 | July | 200m | 1st | 1326 |
| 2004 | December | 200m | 5th | 1321 |
| 2005 | December | 200m | 7th | 1256 |
| 2006 | December | 200m | 18th | 1210 |
| 2008 | December | 200m | 7th | N/A |
| 2008 | December | 100m | 69th | N/A |
| 2009 | December | 100m | 32nd | N/A |
| 2009 | December | 200m | 9th | N/A |

== Clubs ==
| Club | Country |
|---|---|
| High Performance Training Centre (HPTC) | Dakar, Senegal |
| Viry Nord Sud Évry Essonne | France |
| Racing Club de France | France |

== Sport Awards ==
| Year | Name | Award | Discipline |
|---|---|---|---|
| 2000 | Stephan Buckland | Allsports Athlete Award of the Month (June) | Athletics |
| 2000 | Stephan Buckland | Allsports Athlete Award of the Month (September) | Athletics |
| 2000 | Stephan Buckland | National Sports Award Sportsman of the Year | Athletics |
| 2001 | Stephan Buckland | National Sports Award Sportsman of the Year | Athletics |
| 2003 | Stephan Buckland | Allsports Athlete Award of the Month (June) | Athletics |
| 2003 | Stephan Buckland | National Sports Award Sportsman of the Year | Athletics |
| 2006 | Stephan Buckland | Allsports Athlete Award of the Month (March) | Athletics |
| 2006 | Stephan Buckland | Allsports Athlete Award of the Month (August) | Athletics |
| 2006 | Stephan Buckland | National Sports Award Sportsman of the Year | Athletics |
| 2008 | Stephan Buckland | Allsports Athlete Award of the Month (June) | Athletics |
| 2008 | Stephan Buckland | Allsports Athlete Award of the Month (September) | Athletics |
| 2009 | Stephan Buckland | YOP Athlete of the Month (March) | Athletics |
| 2009 | Stephan Buckland | YOP Athlete of the Month (June) | Athletics |

== All Achievements in Athletics ==
| Year | Meeting | Venue | Result | Event | Time |
|---|---|---|---|---|---|
| 1994 | 5th IAAF World Junior Athletics Championships | Lisbon, Portugal | 8th | 200m Heat | 22.26 |
| 1995 | 2nd African Junior Athletics Championships | Bouaké, Ivory Coast | 6th | 100m Final | 10.89 |
| 1995 | Championnats Nationaux Vital | Reduit, Mauritius | 1st | 100 m | 10.61 |
| 1996 | African Athletics Championships | Yaoundé, Cameroon | ? | 100m Semifinal | ? |
| 1996 | 6th IAAF World Junior Athletics Championships | Sydney, Australia | 5th | 100m Heat | 10.68 |
| 1996 | 6th IAAF World Junior Athletics Championships | Sydney, Australia | 8th | 100m Quarterfinal | 11.13 |
| 1997 | Championnats Nationaux Vital | Reduit, Mauritius | 1st | 100 m | 10.61 |
| 1997 | Southern African Meeting | Durban, South Africa | 2nd | 100m | 10.61 |
| 1998 | Jeux des Iles de L'ocean Indien | Saint-Denis, Réunion | 2nd | 100m | ? |
| 1998 | Jeux des Iles de L'ocean Indien | Saint-Denis, Réunion | 1st | 4 × 100 m | 39.86 |
| 1998 | Commonwealth Games | Kuala Lumpur, Malaysia | 7th | 4 × 100 m Final | 42.70 |
| 1999 | IAAF World Indoor Championships | Maebashi, Japan | 6th | 60m Heat | 6.81 |
| 1999 | Meeting Atletica Leggera Viareggio | Viareggio, Italy | 4th | 100m | 10.63 |
| 1999 | Meeting Internazionale Citta di Avellino | Avellino, Italy | 2nd | 100 m | 10.60 |
| 1999 | Lucozade International Sport Meeting | Reduit, Mauritius | 3rd | 100m | 10.50 |
| 1999 | Championnats Nationaux Vital | Reduit, Mauritius | 1st | 100 m | 10.43 |
| 1999 | Meeting International Sotteville-lès-Rouen | Sotteville-lès-Rouen, France | 1st | 100 m | 10.33 |
| 1999 | Meeting National La-Roche-sur-Yon | La Roche-sur-Yon, France | 1st | 100 m | 10.22 |
| 1999 | IAAF World Championships | Seville, Spain | 6th | 100m Heat | 10.43 |
| 1999 | IAAF World Championships | Seville, Spain | 8th | 100m Quarterfinal | 10.39 |
| 1999 | All Africa Games | Johannesburg, South Africa | 3rd | 100m Heat | 10.37 |
| 1999 | All Africa Games | Johannesburg, South Africa | 4th | 100m Semifinal | 10.34 |
| 1999 | All Africa Games | Johannesburg, South Africa | 8th | 100m Final | 11.17 |
| 1999 | All Africa Games | Johannesburg, South Africa | 5th | 4 × 100 m Final | 39.83 |
| 2000 | Pretoria Engen Summer Grand Prix | Pretoria, South Africa | 1st | 100 m | 10.30 |
| 2000 | Mauritius International Meeting | Reduit, Mauritius | 1st | 100m | 10.19 |
| 2000 | Mauritius International Meeting | Reduit, Mauritius | 1st | 200m | 20.66 |
| 2000 | Meeting National de Bugeat | Bugeat, France | 1st | 100m Qualification | 10.57 |
| 2000 | Meeting National de Bugeat | Bugeat, France | 1st | 100m Final | 10.24 |
| 2000 | Meeting Arcobaleno AtleticaEuropa | Celle Ligure, Italy | 1st | 100m | 10.39 |
| 2000 | Meeting Arcobaleno AtleticaEuropa | Celle Ligure, Italy | 1st | 200m | 20.63 |
| 2000 | Meeting Internacional Atletismo Funchal | Funchal, Portugal | 1st | 100m | 10.16 |
| 2000 | Meeting Internacional Atletismo Funchal | Funchal, Portugal | 1st | 200m | 20.31 |
| 2000 | Meeting Atletica Internazionale Barletta | Barletta, Italy | 1st | 100m | 10.29 |
| 2000 | Meeting Atletica Internazionale Barletta | Barletta, Italy | 1st | 200m | 20.43(MR) |
| 2000 | Meeting Atletica Citta di Formia | Formia, Italy | 1st | 200m | 20.78 |
| 2000 | Meeting Atletica Citta di Formia | Formia, Italy | 2nd | 100m | 10.33 |
| 2000 | African Athletics Championships | Algiers, Algeria | 2nd | 100m Final | 10.20 |
| 2000 | African Athletics Championships | Algiers, Algeria | 2nd | 4 × 100 m | 40.07 |
| 2000 | Memorial Primo Nebiolo | Turin, Italy | 2nd | 200m | 20.54 |
| 2000 | Memorial Primo Nebiolo | Turin, Italy | 6th | 100m | 10.38 |
| 2000 | Meeting International Venizelia | Chania, Greece | 4th | 200m | 20.67 |
| 2000 | Meeting Atletismo Lisbon | Lisbon, Portugal | 4th | 100m | 10.22 |
| 2000 | Meeting Pre-Olympic Warmup | Sydney, Australia | 2nd | 100m | 10.36 |
| 2000 | Sydney Olympic Games | Sydney, Australia | 1st | 100m Heat | 10.35 |
| 2000 | Sydney Olympic Games | Sydney, Australia | 4th | 100m Quarterfinal | 10.26 |
| 2000 | Sydney Olympic Games | Sydney, Australia | 2nd | 200m Heat | 20.81 |
| 2000 | Sydney Olympic Games | Sydney, Australia | 4th | 200m Quarterfinal | 20.53 |
| 2000 | Sydney Olympic Games | Sydney, Australia | 6th | 200m Semifinal | 20.56 |
| 2000 | Sydney Olympic Games | Sydney, Australia | 5th | 4 × 100 m Heat | 39.55 |
| 2001 | Nikaia Grand Prix | Nice, France | 4th | 200 m | 20.51 |
| 2001 | Engen Grand Prix Meeting | Pretoria, South Africa | 2nd | 100m | 10.31 |
| 2001 | Qatar Athletics Super Grand Prix | Doha, Qatar | 2nd | 200 m | 20.60 |
| 2001 | Meeting Notturna di Milano | Milan, Italy | 2nd | 200 m | 20.58 |
| 2001 | Meeting International Atletismo Funchal | Funchal, Portugal | 3rd | 100m | 10.42 |
| 2001 | Meeting International Atletismo Funchal | Funchal, Portugal | 1st | 200m | 20.54 |
| 2001 | Meeting Atletica Trofeo Oscali Maurina | Imperia, Italy | 1st | 100 m Qualification | 10.44 |
| 2001 | Meeting Atletica Trofeo Oscali Maurina | Imperia, Italy | 1st | 100 m Final | 10.48 |
| 2001 | Meeting ABSA Yellowpages | Rooterport, South Africa | 1st | 100 m | 10.27 |
| 2001 | Mauritius International Meeting | Reduit, Mauritius | 1st | 100 m | 10.25 |
| 2001 | Mauritius International Meeting | Reduit, Mauritius | 1st | 4 × 100 m | 40.57 |
| 2001 | Meeting International Dakar | Dakar, Senegal | 1st | 100 m | 10.26 |
| 2001 | Meeting International Dakar | Dakar, Senegal | 1st | 200 m | 20.59 |
| 2001 | Memorial Primo Nebiolo | Turin, Italy | 1st | 200 m | 20.58 |
| 2001 | Francophone Games | Ottawa, Canada | 1st | 100 m Heat | 10.29 |
| 2001 | Francophone Games | Ottawa, Canada | 1st | 100 m Quarterfinal | 10.19 |
| 2001 | Francophone Games | Ottawa, Canada | 1st | 100 m Semifinal | 10.22 |
| 2001 | Francophone Games | Ottawa, Canada | 1st | 100 m Final | 10.13 |
| 2001 | Francophone Games | Ottawa, Canada | 1st | 200 m Heat | 20.62 |
| 2001 | Francophone Games | Ottawa, Canada | 1st | 200 m Semifinal | 20.66 |
| 2001 | Francophone Games | Ottawa, Canada | 1st | 200 m Final | 20.33 |
| 2001 | Francophone Games | Ottawa, Canada | 1st | 4 × 100 m Final | 39.04 |
| 2001 | IAAF World Athletics Championships | Edmonton, Canada | 2nd | 200 m Heat | 20.61 |
| 2001 | IAAF World Athletics Championships | Edmonton, Canada | 3rd | 200 m Quarterfinal | 20.23 |
| 2001 | IAAF World Athletics Championships | Edmonton, Canada | 3rd | 200 m Semifinal | 20.15 |
| 2001 | IAAF World Athletics Championships | Edmonton, Canada | 6th | 200 m Final | 20.24 |
| 2001 | IAAF World Athletics Championships | Edmonton, Canada | 2nd | 4 × 100 m Heat | 38.99 (NR) |
| 2001 | IAAF World Athletics Championships | Edmonton, Canada | 7th | 4 × 100 m Semifinal | 39.25 |
| 2001 | Weltklasse Golden League | Zurich, Switzerland | 7th | 200 m | 20.63 |
| 2001 | Memorial Van Damme Golden League | Brussels, Belgium | 7th | 200 m | 20.42 |
| 2001 | Goodwill Games | Brisbane, Australia | 7th | 200 m | 20.92 |
| 2001 | Apres Midi des Stars | Reduit, Mauritius | 2nd | 300 m | 33.41 |
| 2002 | 1st Lucozade National Meeting | Reduit, Mauritius | 1st | 200 m | 21.51 |
| 2002 | Pretoria Engen Summer Grand Prix | Pretoria, South Africa | 4th | 100 m | 10.29 |
| 2002 | Germiston Engen Summer Grand Prix | Germiston, South Africa | 3rd | 200 m | 20.43 |
| 2002 | Germiston Engen Summer Grand Prix | Germiston, South Africa | 2nd | 100 m | 10.25 |
| 2002 | Meeting International Dakar | Dakar, Senegal | 2nd | 100 m | 10.20 |
| 2002 | Meeting Notturna di Milano | Milan, Italy | 2nd | 200 m | 21.02 |
| 2002 | Meeting Geants du Nord | Villeneuve-d'Ascq, France | 2nd | 200 m | 20.29 |
| 2002 | Meeting Geants du Nord | Villeneuve-d'Ascq, France | 2nd | 100 m | 10.32 |
| 2002 | KBC Night of Athletics | Heusden Zolder, Belgium | 6th | 100 m | 10.47 |
| 2002 | Memorial Primo Nebiolo | Turin, Italy | 4th | 100 m | 10.37 |
| 2002 | Championnats Nationaux Vital | Reduit, Mauritius | 1st | 100 m | 10.17 |
| 2002 | Mauritius International Meeting | Reduit, Mauritius | 1st | 100 m | 10.13 |
| 2002 | Golden Gala Golden League | Rome, Italy | 5th | 200 m | 20.56 |
| 2002 | Athens Grand Prix | Athens, Greece | 4th | 200 m | 20.31 |
| 2002 | Athletissima Super Grand Prix | Lausanne, Switzerland | 8th | 200 m | 20.78 |
| 2002 | Commonwealth Games | Manchester, England | 1st | 200 m Heat | 20.91 |
| 2002 | Commonwealth Games | Manchester, England | 1st | 200 m Quarterfinal | 20.77 |
| 2002 | Commonwealth Games | Manchester, England | 6th | 200 m Semifinal | 20.61 |
| 2003 | Engen Summer Series | Roodepoort, South Africa | 9th | 100m | 10.61 |
| 2003 | Engen Summer Series | Pretoria, South Africa | 6th | 200m | 20.72 |
| 2003 | Meeting Lucozade | Reduit, Mauritius | 1st | 100m | 10.64 |
| 2003 | Championnats Nationaux Vital | Reduit, Mauritius | 1st | 100 m Qualification | 10.22 |
| 2003 | Championnats Nationaux Vital | Reduit, Mauritius | 1st | 100 m Final | 10.45 |
| 2003 | Air Mauritius International Meeting | Reduit, Mauritius | 1st | 100m | 10.62 |
| 2003 | Gran Premio Reebok | San Sebastián, Spain | 4th | 100m | 10.22 |
| 2003 | Athletissima Super Grand Prix | Lausanne, Switzerland | 4th | 200m | 20.43 |
| 2003 | Gaz de France Golden League | Paris, France | 4th | 200m | 20.42 |
| 2003 | Athens Grand Prix | Athens, Greece | 5th | 100m Qualification | 10.30 |
| 2003 | Athens Grand Prix | Athens, Greece | 7th | 100m Final | 10.21 |
| 2003 | Athens Grand Prix | Athens, Greece | 2nd | 200m | 20.32 |
| 2003 | Rome Golden Gala Golden League | Rome, Italy | 3rd | 200 m | 20.48 |
| 2003 | KBC Night of Athletics | Heusden Zolder, Belgium | 1st | 200 m | 20.33 |
| 2003 | KBC Night of Athletics | Heusden Zolder, Belgium | 2nd | 100 m | 10.27 |
| 2003 | Meeting International Resisprint | La Chaux-de-Fonds, Switzerland | 2nd | 100 m Qualification | 10.23 |
| 2003 | Meeting International Resisprint | La Chaux-de-Fonds, Switzerland | 2nd | 100 m Final | 10.20 |
| 2003 | Meeting International Resisprint | La Chaux-de-Fonds, Switzerland | 1st | 200 m | 20.29(MR) |
| 2003 | IAAF World Athletics Championships | Paris, France | 1st | 200 m 1st round | 20.38 |
| 2003 | IAAF World Athletics Championships | Paris, France | 1st | 200 m Quarterfinal | 20.06(NR) |
| 2003 | IAAF World Athletics Championships | Paris, France | 2nd | 200 m Semifinal | 20.11 |
| 2003 | IAAF World Athletics Championships | Paris, France | 5th | 200 m Final | 20.41 |
| 2003 | Jeux des Iles de L'Ocean Indien | Bambous, Mauritius | 1st | 100m Qualification | 10.79 |
| 2003 | Jeux des Iles de L'Ocean Indien | Bambous, Mauritius | 1st | 100m Final | 10.60 |
| 2003 | Jeux des Iles de L'Ocean Indien | Bambous, Mauritius | 1st | 200 m Qualification | 20.46(CR) |
| 2003 | Jeux des Iles de L'Ocean Indien | Bambous, Mauritius | 1st | 200 m Final | 20.64 |
| 2003 | Jeux des Iles de L'Ocean Indien | Bambous, Mauritius | 1st | 4 × 100 m Final | 39.23(CR) |
| 2003 | IAAF World Athletics Final | Monte Carlo, Monaco | 3rd | 200 m | 20.44 |
| 2004 | Preparation Meeting | Reduit, Mauritius | 1st | 60m | 6.73 (NR) |
| 2004 | Preparation Meeting | Reduit, Mauritius | 1st | 150m | 15.47 (NR) |
| 2004 | IAAF World Indoor Championships | Budapest, Hungary | 5th | 60 m Heat | 6.72(NR) |
| 2004 | IAAF World Indoor Championships | Budapest, Hungary | 7th | 60 m Semifinal | 6.75 |
| 2004 | Qatar Athletics Super Grand Prix | Doha, Qatar | 4th | 100 m Qualification | 10.15 |
| 2004 | Qatar Athletics Super Grand Prix | Doha, Qatar | 8th | 100 m Final | 10.22 |
| 2004 | Zlata Tetra Golden Spike | Ostrava, Czech Republic | 5th | 200 m | 20.64 |
| 2004 | Bergen ExxonnMobil Bislett Games | Oslo, Norway | 4th | 200 m | 20.64 |
| 2004 | Championnats de France de Relais | Toulouse, France | 4th | 4 × 200 m | 1:25:49 |
| 2004 | Championnats de France de Relais | Toulouse, France | 1st | 4 × 100 m Heat | 41.16 |
| 2004 | Championnats de France de Relais | Toulouse, France | 1st | 4 × 100 m Semifinal | 40.32 |
| 2004 | Championnats de France de Relais | Toulouse, France | 1st | 4 × 100 m Final | 39.71 |
| 2004 | Championnats de France Interclubs N1A Hommes | Franconville, France | 1st | 4 × 100 m | 41.17 |
| 2004 | Championnats de France Interclubs N1A Hommes | Franconville, France | 1st | 200m | 20.51 |
| 2004 | Championnats Nationaux Vital | Reduit, Mauritius | 1st | 100 m Qualification | 10.30 |
| 2004 | Championnats Nationaux Vital | Reduit, Mauritius | 1st | 100 m Final | 10.36 |
| 2004 | Lucozade Sport National Circuit | Reduit, Mauritius | 1st | 100 m | 10.43 |
| 2004 | Lucozade Sport National Circuit | Reduit, Mauritius | 1st | 200 m | 20.82 |
| 2004 | Skyline International Meeting | Reduit, Mauritius | 1st | 100 m | 10.21 |
| 2004 | Golden Gala Golden League | Rome, Italy | 1st | 200 m | 20.20 |
| 2004 | Athens Super Grand Prix | Athens, Greece | 2nd | 200 m | 20.28 |
| 2004 | Athletissima Super Grand Prix | Lausanne, Switzerland | 2nd | 200 m | 20.27 |
| 2004 | Gaz de France Golden League | Paris, France | 4th | 200 m | 20.46 |
| 2004 | Weltklasse Golden League | Zurich, Switzerland | 5th | 200 m | 20.56 |
| 2004 | Olympic Games of the XXVIII Olympiad | Athens, Greece | 1st | 200 m Heat | 20.29 |
| 2004 | Olympic Games of the XXVIII Olympiad | Athens, Greece | 2nd | 200 m Quarterfinal | 20.36 |
| 2004 | Olympic Games of the XXVIII Olympiad | Athens, Greece | 3rd | 200 m Semifinal | 20.37 |
| 2004 | Olympic Games of the XXVIII Olympiad | Athens, Greece | 6th | 200 m Final | 20.24 |
| 2004 | IAAF World Athletics Final | Monte Carlo, Monaco | 3rd | 200 m | 20.41 |
| 2005 | Preparation Meeting | Reduit, Mauritius | 1st | 150 m | 15.74 |
| 2005 | Preparation Meeting | Reduit, Mauritius | 1st | 300 m | 33.51 |
| 2005 | Lucozade National Sport 1er Manche | Reduit, Mauritius | 1st | 100 m | 10.39 |
| 2005 | Lucozade National Sport 2er Manche | Reduit, Mauritius | 1st | 200 m | 20.71 |
| 2005 | Lucozade National Sport 3er Manche | Reduit, Mauritius | 1st | 100 m | 10.42 |
| 2005 | Skyline International Meeting | Reduit, Mauritius | 1st | 100 m | 10.40 |
| 2005 | Meeting Internazionale Citta di Avellino | Avellino, Italy | 1st | 100 m | 10.28(MR) |
| 2005 | Meeting Internazionale Citta di Avellino | Avellino, Italy | 1st | 200 m | 20.28(MR) |
| 2005 | Meeting Gobierno de Aragon | Zaragoza, Spain | 1st | 200 m | 20.78(MR) |
| 2005 | DN Galan Super Grand Prix | Stockholm, Sweden | 1st | 200 m | 20.67 |
| 2005 | Championnats de France de Relais | Obernai, France | 1st | 4 × 100 m Qualification | 40.82 |
| 2005 | Championnats de France de Relais | Obernai, France | 1st | 4 × 100 m Final | 40.28 |
| 2005 | IAAF World Athletics Championships | Helsinki, Finland | 1st | 200m 1st round | 20.94 |
| 2005 | IAAF World Athletics Championships | Helsinki, Finland | 2nd | 200m Quarterfinal | 20.66 |
| 2005 | IAAF World Athletics Championships | Helsinki, Finland | 3rd | 200m Semifinal | 20.54 |
| 2005 | IAAF World Athletics Championships | Helsinki, Finland | 5th | 200m Final | 20.41 |
| 2005 | Norwich Union Sheffield Grand Prix | Sheffield, England | 3rd | 200m | 20.39 |
| 2005 | IAAF World Athletics Final | Monte Carlo, Monaco | 5th | 200m | 20.64 |
| 2006 | Preparation Meeting | Reduit, Mauritius | 1st | 300 m | 32.90 |
| 2006 | Match Reunion-Maurice Seniors | Saint-Denis, Réunion | 1st | 100 m | 10.46 |
| 2006 | Match Reunion-Maurice Seniors | Saint-Denis, Réunion | 1st | 200 m | 20.66 |
| 2006 | Match Reunion-Maurice Seniors | Saint-Denis, Réunion | 1st | 4 × 100 m | 40.35 |
| 2006 | 34th Gran Premio Diputacion de Salamanca | Salamanca, Spain | 1st | 100 m | 10.23 |
| 2006 | Mauritius International Meeting | Reduit, Mauritius | 1st | 100 m | 10.23 |
| 2006 | Mauritius International Meeting | Reduit, Mauritius | 1st | 200 m | 20.59 |
| 2006 | Meeting International Sotteville Les Rouens | Sotteville, France | 1st | 200 m | 20.58 |
| 2006 | Meeting Papaflessia | Kalamata, Greece | 3rd | 100 m | 10.37 |
| 2006 | Meeting Papaflessia | Kalamata, Greece | 3rd | 200 m | 20.63 |
| 2006 | Meeting Lille Metropole | Villeneuve-d'Ascq, France | 4th | 200 m | 20.70 |
| 2006 | Memorial Primo Nebiolo | Turin, Italy | 2nd | 200 m | 20.75 |
| 2006 | African Athletics Championships | Bambous, Mauritius | 1st | 200 m Heat | 21.35 |
| 2006 | African Athletics Championships | Bambous, Mauritius | 2nd | 200 m Semifinal | 20.93 |
| 2006 | African Athletics Championships | Bambous, Mauritius | 2nd | 200 m Final | 20.67 |
| 2006 | Commonwealth Games | Melbourne, Australia | 2nd | 200 m Heat | 20.56 |
| 2006 | Commonwealth Games | Melbourne, Australia | 2nd | 200 m Quarterfinal | 20.54 |
| 2006 | Commonwealth Games | Melbourne, Australia | 1st | 200 m Semifinal | 20.63 |
| 2006 | Commonwealth Games | Melbourne, Australia | 2nd | 200 m Final | 20.47 |
| 2006 | Commonwealth Games | Melbourne, Australia | 2nd | 4 × 100 m Heat | 39.55 |
| 2006 | Commonwealth Games | Melbourne, Australia | 4th | 4 × 100 m Final | 39.97 |
| 2006 | IAAF World Cup in Athletics | Athens, Greece | 8th | 200 m | 20.96 |
| 2006 | IAAF World Cup in Athletics | Athens, Greece | 5th | 4 × 100 m | 38.87 |
| 2007 | Preparation Meeting | Reduit, Mauritius | 2nd | 100 m | 10.64 |
| 2007 | Mauritius International Meeting | Reduit, Mauritius | 2nd | 100 m | 10.56 |
| 2007 | Mauritius International Meeting | Reduit, Mauritius | 1st | 200 m | 21.20 |
| 2007 | Mauritius Youth Championships | Reduit, Mauritius | 1st | 200 m | 21.11 |
| 2007 | 1st Lucozade National Meeting | Reduit, Mauritius | 2nd | 100 m | 10.64 |
| 2007 | 1st Lucozade National Meeting | Reduit, Mauritius | 1st | 200 m | 21.38 |
| 2008 | Preparation Meeting (January) | Reduit, Mauritius | 1st | 60 m | 6.84 |
| 2008 | Preparation Meeting (January) | Reduit, Mauritius | 1st | 150 m | 15.77 |
| 2008 | Preparation Meeting (January) | Reduit, Mauritius | 1st | 300 m | 33.95 |
| 2008 | Preparation Meeting (29 February) | Reduit, Mauritius | 1st | 100 m | 10.35 |
| 2008 | Preparation Meeting (8 March) | Reduit, Mauritius | 1st | 200 m | 21.00 |
| 2008 | Preparation Meeting (29 March) | Reduit, Mauritius | 1st | 100 m | 10.49 |
| 2008 | Zlata Tetra Golden Spike | Ostrava, Czech Republic | 4th | 200 m | 20.74 |
| 2008 | Meeting International Tangiers | Tangiers, Morocco | 1st | 200 m | 20.81(MR) |
| 2008 | Meeting Internazionale Terra Sarda | Cagliari, Italy | 1st | 200 m | 20.80 |
| 2008 | Meeting Internazionale Terra Sarda | Cagliari, Italy | 1st | 100 m | 10.32 |
| 2008 | Mauritius International Meeting | Reduit, Mauritius | 1st | 100 m | 10.40 |
| 2008 | Mauritius International Meeting | Reduit, Mauritius | 1st | 200 m | 20.73 |
| 2008 | Preparation Meeting (25 April) | Reduit, Mauritius | 1st | 100 m | 10.46 |
| 2008 | CAA Super Grand Prix | Brazzaville, Congo | 6th | 100 m | 10.63 |
| 2008 | CAA Super Grand Prix | Brazzaville, Congo | 1st | 200 m | 20.74 |
| 2008 | Memoriál Josefa Odložila | Prague, Czech Republic | 1st | 200 m | 20.40 |
| 2008 | Memoriál Josefa Odložila | Prague, Czech Republic | 1st | 100 m Qualification | 10.47 |
| 2008 | Memoriál Josefa Odložila | Prague, Czech Republic | 3rd | 100 m Final | 10.33 |
| 2008 | Zagreb Grand Prix | Zagreb, Croatia | 1st | 200 m | 20.57 |
| 2008 | Zagreb Grand Prix | Zagreb, Croatia | 7th | 100 m | 10.65 |
| 2008 | African Athletics Championships | Addis Ababa, Ethiopia | 1st | 100 m Heat | 10.59 |
| 2008 | African Athletics Championships | Addis Ababa, Ethiopia | 5th | 100 m Semifinal | 10.54 |
| 2008 | African Athletics Championships | Addis Ababa, Ethiopia | 1st | 200 m Heat | 21.18 |
| 2008 | African Athletics Championships | Addis Ababa, Ethiopia | 1st | 200 m Semifinal | 21.01 |
| 2008 | African Athletics Championships | Addis Ababa, Ethiopia | 2nd | 200 m Final | 20.62 |
| 2008 | Meeting Lille Metropole | Villeneuve-d'Ascq, France | 2nd | 200 m | 20.52 |
| 2008 | Rieti Grand Prix | Rieti, Italy | 2nd | 200 m | 20.40 |
| 2008 | Meeting Internazionale Certamo di Barletta | Barletta, Italy | 2nd | 100 m | 10.52 |
| 2008 | Palio Città della Quercia | Rovereto, Italy | 2nd | 100 m | 10.43 |
| 2008 | Beijing Olympic Games | Beijing, China | 3rd | 200 m Heat | 20.98 |
| 2008 | Beijing Olympic Games | Beijing, China | 5th | 200 m Quarterfinal | 20.37 |
| 2008 | Beijing Olympic Games | Beijing, China | 6th | 200 m Semifinal | 20.48 |
| 2008 | IAAF World Athletics Final | Stuttgart, Germany | 1st | 200 m | 20.57 |
| 2009 | Preparation Meeting | Reduit, Mauritius | 1st | 100 m | 10.52 |
| 2009 | Germiston Yellowpages Series | Germiston, South Africa | 1st | 100m | 10.40 |
| 2009 | Germiston Yellowpages Series | Germiston, South Africa | 1st | 200m | 20.60 |
| 2009 | Germiston Yellowpages Series | Germiston, South Africa | 2nd | 4 × 100 m | 39.72 |
| 2009 | Preparation Meeting (4 April) | Reduit, Mauritius | 1st | 100 m | 10.56 |
| 2009 | Preparation Meeting (17 April) | Reduit, Mauritius | 1st | 100 m | 10.49 |
| 2009 | Preparation Meeting (17 April) | Reduit, Mauritius | 1st | 200 m | 20.91 |
| 2009 | Circuit National Lucozade Sport | Reduit, Mauritius | 1st | 200m | 20.78 |
| 2009 | Circuit National Lucozade Sport | Reduit, Mauritius | 1st | 4 × 100 m | 40.18 |
| 2009 | Mauritius International Meeting | Reduit, Mauritius | 1st | 100m | 10.23 |
| 2009 | Mauritius International Meeting | Reduit, Mauritius | 1st | 200m | 20.74 |
| 2009 | Mauritius International Meeting | Reduit, Mauritius | 1st | 4 × 100 m | 39.88 |
| 2009 | Athletissima Super Grand Prix | Lausanne, Switzerland | 7th | 200m | 21.30 |
| 2009 | Zlatá Tetra / Golden Spike | Ostrava, Czech Republic | 6th | 200m | 20.83 |
| 2009 | Meeting Internacional Atletismo Madrid | Madrid, Spain | 5th | 100m Qualification | 10.43 |
| 2009 | Meeting Internacional Atletismo Madrid | Madrid, Spain | 3rd | 100m Final | 10.38 |
| 2009 | Meeting Stanislas Nancy Alma Athle Tour | Tomblaine, France | 2nd | 100m | 10.21 |
| 2009 | Meeting Lille Metropole Alma Athle Tour | Villeneuve-d'Ascq, France | 1st | 100m | 10.15 |
| 2009 | Meeting Lille Metropole Alma Athle Tour | Villeneuve-d'Ascq, France | 1st | 200m | 20.33 |
| 2009 | Meeting Atletismo Ciudad da Málaga | Málaga, Spain | 1st | 200m | 20.33 |
| 2009 | Athens Grand Prix Tsiklitiria | Athens, Greece | 2nd | 200m | 20.33 |
| 2009 | Athens Grand Prix Tsiklitiria | Athens, Greece | 8th | 100m | 10.37 |
| 2009 | IAAF World Athletics Championships | Berlin, Germany | 3rd | 200m Heat | 21.00 |
| 2009 | IAAF World Athletics Championships | Berlin, Germany | 8th | 200m Quarterfinal | 21.33 |
| 2009 | Francophone Games | Beirut, Lebanon | 1st | 200m Heat | 21.05 |
| 2009 | Francophone Games | Beirut, Lebanon | 1st | 200m Semifinal | 20.78 |
| 2009 | Francophone Games | Beirut, Lebanon | 2nd | 200m Final | 20.59 |
| 2009 | Francophone Games | Beirut, Lebanon | 2nd | 4 × 100 m | 39.60 |
| 2009 | IAAF World Athletics Final | Thessaloniki, Greece | 4th | 200 m | 20.75 |
| 2010 | Preparation Meeting | Reduit, Mauritius | 2nd | 100 m | 10.75 |
| 2010 | Yellowpages Series | Durban, South Africa | 4th | 100 m | 10.76 |
| 2010 | Yellowpages Series | Johannesburg, South Africa | 7th | 200 m | 21.42 |
| 2010 | Lucozade Sport Grand Prix | Reduit, Mauritius | 1st | 100 m | 10.39 |
| 2010 | Mauritius International Meeting | Reduit, Mauritius | 1st | 100 m | 10.56 |
| 2010 | Lucozade Sport Grand Prix | Reduit, Mauritius | 2nd | 100 m | 10.72 |
| 2010 | Lucozade Sport Grand Prix | Reduit, Mauritius | 3rd | 200 m | 21.68 |
| 2011 | KFC National Juniors Championships Open Events | Reduit, Mauritius | 1st | 4 × 100 m (Mangalkhan SC Team) | 40.77 |
| 2012 | KFC National Juniors Championships Open Events | Reduit, Mauritius | 2nd | 100m | 10.97 |
| 2012 | Championnats Nationaux Seniors Vital | Bambous, Mauritius | 1st | 100m | 11.06 |
| 2015 | Meeting Villers le Nancy | Nancy, France | 1st | 100m | 11.00 |
| 2015 | Meeting de Metz | Metz, France | 1st | 4 × 100 m Qualification | 40.78 |
| 2015 | Meeting de Metz | Metz, France | 3rd | 4 × 100 m Final | 43.35 |
| 2016 | Meeting Coupe de L'Amitie | Dillingen, Luxembourg | 1st | 4 × 100 m | 41.80 |
| 2016 | Meeting de Neufchâteau | Neufchâteau, France | 1st | 4 × 100 m | 42.15 |

== African 200m Runners Toplists By Year ==
| Year | Rank | Name | Country | Time |
|---|---|---|---|---|
| 2000 | 1st | Francis Obikwelu | Nigeria | 20.01 |
| 2000 | 2nd | Oumar Loum | Senegal | 20.21 |
| 2000 | 3rd | Aziz Zakari | Ghana | 20.23 |
| 2000 | 4th | Stephan Buckland | Mauritius | 20.31 |
| 2000 | 5th | Joseph Batangdon | Cameroon | 20.31 |

| Year | Rank | Name | Country | Time |
|---|---|---|---|---|
| 2001 | 1st | Stephan Buckland | Mauritius | 20.15 |
| 2001 | 2nd | Corne du Plessis | South Africa | 20.39 |
| 2001 | 3rd | Uchenna Emedolu | Nigeria | 20.40 |
| 2001 | 4th | Oumar Loum | Senegal | 20.43 |
| 2001 | 5th | Brian Dzingai | Zimbabwe | 20.50 |

| Year | Rank | Name | Country | Time |
|---|---|---|---|---|
| 2002 | 1st | Frankie Fredericks | Namibia | 19.99 |
| 2002 | 2nd | Morne Nagel | South Africa | 20.11 |
| 2002 | 3rd | Deji Aliu | Nigeria | 20.25 |
| 2002 | 4th | Stephan Buckland | Mauritius | 20.29 |
| 2002 | 5th | Aziz Zakari | Ghana | 20.29 |

| Year | Rank | Name | Country | Time |
|---|---|---|---|---|
| 2003 | 1st | Stephan Buckland | Mauritius | 20.06 |
| 2003 | 2nd | Sherwin Vries | Namibia | 20.20 |
| 2003 | 3rd | Frankie Fredericks | Namibia | 20.23 |
| 2003 | 4th | Aziz Zakari | Ghana | 20.34 |
| 2003 | 5th | Morne Nagel | South Africa | 20.37 |

| Year | Rank | Name | Country | Time |
|---|---|---|---|---|
| 2004 | 1st | Brian Dzingai | Zimbabwe | 20.12 |
| 2004 | 2nd | Frankie Fredericks | Namibia | 20.14 |
| 2004 | 3rd | Stephan Buckland | Mauritius | 20.20 |
| 2004 | 4th | Uchenna Emedolu | Nigeria | 20.39 |
| 2004 | 5th | Leigh Julius | South Africa | 20.44 |

| Year | Rank | Name | Country | Time |
|---|---|---|---|---|
| 2005 | 1st | Stephan Buckland | Mauritius | 20.28 |
| 2005 | 2nd | Brian Dzingai | Zimbabwe | 20.33 |
| 2005 | 3rd | Morne Nagel | South Africa | 20.35 |
| 2005 | 4th | Seth Amoo | Ghana | 20.36 |
| 2005 | 5th | Leigh Julius | South Africa | 20.47 |

| Year | Rank | Name | Country | Time |
|---|---|---|---|---|
| 2006 | 1st | Gary Kikaya | Congo | 20.40 |
| 2006 | 2nd | Stephan Buckland | Mauritius | 20.47 |
| 2006 | 3rd | Jaysuma Ndure | Gambia | 20.48 |
| 2006 | 4th | Uchenna Emedolu | Nigeria | 20.51 |
| 2006 | 5th | Leigh Julius | South Africa | 20.54 |

| Year | Rank | Name | Country | Time |
|---|---|---|---|---|
| 2008 | 1st | Brian Dzingai | Zimbabwe | 20.17 |
| 2008 | 2nd | Stephan Buckland | Mauritius | 20.37 |
| 2008 | 3rd | Thuso Mpuang | South Africa | 20.53 |
| 2008 | 4th | Obinna Metu | Nigeria | 20.55 |
| 2008 | 5th | Amr Seoud | Egypt | 20.55 |

| Year | Rank | Name | Country | Time |
|---|---|---|---|---|
| 2009 | 1st | Stephan Buckland | Mauritius | 20.33 |
| 2009 | 2nd | Brian Dzingai | Zimbabwe | 20.37 |
| 2009 | 3rd | Ben Meité | Ivory Coast | 20.37 |
| 2009 | 4th | Gary Kikaya | Congo | 20.47 |
| 2009 | 5th | Tshegofatso Meshoe | South Africa | 20.47 |

== All Countries Competed ==
| Country | Cities |
|---|---|
| Algeria | Algiers |
| Australia | Sydney, Brisbane, Melbourne |
| Belgium | Brussels, Heusden-Zolder |
| Canada | Ottawa, Edmonton |
| Cameroon | Yaoundé |
| China | Beijing |
| Congo | Brazzaville |
| Croatia | Zagreb |
| Czech Republic | Ostrava, Prague |
| Ethiopia | Addis Ababa |
| Finland | Helsinki |
| France | Paris, Bugeat, Nancy, Nice, Lille, La Roche-Sur-Yon, Nice, Obernai, Toulouse, Franconville, Sotteville, Metz |
| Germany | Berlin, Stuttgart |
| Greece | Athens, Chania, Heraklion, Kalamata, Thessaloniki |
| Hungary | Budapest |
| Italy | Avellino, Barletta, Celle Ligure, Imperia, Turin, Rieti, Milan, Cagliari, Caorle, Rome, Rovereto, Formia, Viareggio |
| Japan | Maebashi |
| Ivory Coast | Bouaké |
| Lebanon | Beirut |
| Mauritius | Bambous, Reduit |
| Morocco | Tangiers |
| Monaco | Monte Carlo |
| Malaysia | Kuala Lumpur |
| Norway | Oslo |
| Portugal | Funchal, Lisbon |
| Qatar | Doha |
| Réunion | Saint-Denis, Saint-Paul |
| Senegal | Dakar |
| Spain | Madrid, Málaga, San Sebastián, Salamanca, Seville, Zaragoza |
| South Africa | Durban, Germiston, Pretoria, Roodepoort, Johannesburg |
| Sweden | Stockholm |
| Switzerland | La Chaux-de-Fonds, Lausanne, Zurich |
| United Kingdom | Birmingham, Manchester, Sheffield |
| Zimbabwe | Harare |

== Fastest 100m Mauritian Sprinters ==
| Rank | Athlete | Time |
|---|---|---|
| 1 | Noah bibi | 10.11 |
| 2 | Stephan Buckland | 10.13 |
| 3 | Orphée Topize | 10.24 |
| 4 | Jonathan Chimier | 10.36 |
| 5 | Arnaud Casquette | 10.40 |
| 6 | Fabrice Coiffic | 10.45 |
| 7 | David Victoire | 10.47 |
| 8 | Nicholas Hogan | 10.49 |
| 9 | Fernando Augustin | 10.51 |

== Fastest 200m Mauritian Sprinters ==
| Rank | Athlete | Time | Venue |
|---|---|---|---|
| 1 | Stephan Buckland | 20.06 | Paris, France |
| 2 | Eric Milazar | 20.66 | La-Chaux-de-Fonds, Switzerland |
| 3 | Jonathan Permal | 20.85 | Marrakech, Morocco |
| 4 | Fabrice Coiffic | 20.89 | La-Chaux-de-Fonds, Switzerland |
| 5 | Ommanandsing Kowlessur | 20.96 | Bamako, Mali |
| 6 | Nicholas Hogan | 20.99 | Saint-Paul, Reunion |
| 7 | Fernando Augustin | 21.01 | Lagenthal, Switzerland |

Olympic Games
| Preceded by Michael Medor | Flagbearer for Mauritius; Beijing 2008 | Succeeded by Natacha Rigobert |
