= Mauritius Olympic Committee =

National Olympic Committee

- Country/Region: Mauritius
- Code: MRI
- Created: 1971
- Recognized: 1972
- Continental Association: ANOCA
- President: Philippe Hao Thyn Voon Ha Shun
- Secretary General: Al-Yousouf Bayjoo
- Website: mauritiusolympic.org/en

The Mauritius Olympic Committee (IOC code: MRI) is the National Olympic Committee representing Mauritius.

== See also ==
- Mauritius at the Olympics
- Mauritius at the Commonwealth Games
