= Australia at the 1992 Summer Olympics =

- IOC code: AUS
- NOC: Australian Olympic Committee

in Barcelona
- Competitors: 279 (187 men, 92 women) in 25 sports
- Flag bearers: Jenny Donnet (opening); Kieren Perkins (closing)
- Medals Ranked 10th: Gold 7 Silver 9 Bronze 11 Total 27

Summer Olympics appearances (overview)
- 1896; 1900; 1904; 1908; 1912; 1920; 1924; 1928; 1932; 1936; 1948; 1952; 1956; 1960; 1964; 1968; 1972; 1976; 1980; 1984; 1988; 1992; 1996; 2000; 2004; 2008; 2012; 2016; 2020; 2024; 2028

Other related appearances
- 1906 Intercalated Games –––– Australasia (1908–1912)

Australia competed at the 1992 Summer Olympics in Barcelona, Spain. Australian athletes have competed in every Summer Olympic Games of the modern era. 279 competitors, 187 men and 92 women, took part in 153 events in 25 sports.

== Medalists ==
Medal	Name	Sport	Event	Date
Gold	Kathy Watt	Cycling	Women's individual road race	26 July
Gold	Matt Ryan	Equestrian	Individual eventing	30 July
Gold	David Green; Andrew Hoy; Gillian Rolton; Matt Ryan	Equestrian	Team eventing	30 July
Gold	Kieren Perkins	Swimming	Men's 1500 metre freestyle	31 July
Gold	Peter Antonie; Stephen Hawkins	Rowing	Men's double sculls	1 August
Gold	Andrew Cooper; Nick Green; Mike McKay; James Tomkins	Rowing	Men's coxless four	2 August
Gold	Clint Robinson	Canoeing	Men's K-1 1000 metres	8 August
Silver	Shane Kelly	Cycling	Men's track time trial	27 July
Silver	Kieren Perkins	Swimming	Men's 400 metre freestyle	29 July
Silver	Hayley Lewis	Swimming	Women's 800 metre freestyle	30 July
Silver	Glen Housman	Swimming	Men's 1500 metre freestyle	31 July
Silver	Gary Neiwand	Cycling	Men's sprint	31 July
Silver	Brett Aitken; Stephen McGlede; Shaun O'Brien; Stuart O'Grady	Cycling	Men's team pursuit	31 July
Silver	Kathy Watt	Cycling	Women's individual pursuit	31 July
Silver	Danielle Woodward	Canoeing	Women's slalom K-1	1 August
Silver	Australia men's national field hockey team: John Bestall; Warren Birmingham; Lee Bodimeade; Ashley Carey; Greg Corbitt; Stephen Davies; Damon Diletti; Lachlan Dreher; Lachlan Elmer; Dean Evans; Paul Lewis; Graham Reid; Jay Stacy; David Wansbrough; Ken Wark; Michael York	Field hockey	Men's tournament	8 August
Bronze	Phil Rogers	Swimming	Men's 100 metre breaststroke	26 July
Bronze	Hayley Lewis	Swimming	Women's 400 metre freestyle	28 July
Bronze	Samantha Riley	Swimming	Women's 100 metre breaststroke	29 July
Bronze	Susie O'Neill	Swimming	Women's 200 metre butterfly	31 July
Bronze	Nicole Stevenson	Swimming	Women's 200 metre backstroke	31 July
Bronze	Lars Kleppich	Sailing	Men's Lechner A-390	2 August
Bronze	Tim Forsyth	Athletics	Men's high jump	2 August
Bronze	Mitch Booth; John Forbes	Sailing	Tornado	3 August
Bronze	Daniela Costian	Athletics	Women's discus throw	3 August
Bronze	Rachel McQuillan; Nicole Provis	Tennis	Women's doubles	6 August
Bronze	Ramon Andersson; Kelvin Graham; Ian Rowling; Steven Wood	Canoeing	Men's K-4 1000 metres	8 August

== Competitors ==
The following is the list of number of competitors in the Games.

Sport	Men	Women	Total
Archery	3	0	3
Athletics	16	19	35
Badminton	0	2	2
Basketball	12	0	12
Boxing	6	–	6
Canoeing	11	6	17
Cycling	13	3	16
Diving	3	4	7
Equestrian	3	2	5
Fencing	2	0	2
Field hockey	16	16	32
Football	19	–	19
Gymnastics	1	6	7
Judo	1	1	2
Modern pentathlon	3	–	3
Rowing	21	7	28
Sailing	9	4	13
Shooting	6	1	7
Swimming	19	14	33
Synchronized swimming	–	2	2
Table tennis	0	2	2
Tennis	4	3	7
Water polo	13	–	13
Weightlifting	4	–	4
Wrestling	2	–	2
Total	187	92	279

== Archery ==
In the sixth Olympic archery competition that Australia contested, the nation sent three men. Grant Greenham had the nation's only individual win, though the trio also won their first match in the team round.

Men

Athlete	Event	Ranking round		Round of 32	Round of 16	Quarterfinals	Semifinals	Final / BM	
Athlete	Event	Score	Seed	Opposition Score	Opposition Score	Opposition Score	Opposition Score	Opposition Score	Rank
Simon Fairweather	Individual	1315	5 Q	Verstegen (NED); L 98–107	Did not advance				
Grant Greenham	Individual	1298	15 Q	Vázquez (ESP); W 100–96	Shikarev (EUN); L 94–102	Did not advance			
Scott Hunter-Russell	Individual	1252	48	Did not advance					
Simon Fairweather; Grant Greenham; Scott Hunter-Russell	Team	3865	3 Q	—N/a	China; W 238–230	Great Britain; L 236–242	Did not advance		

== Athletics ==
Men
Track and road events

Athlete	Event	Heats		Quarterfinal		Semifinal		Final	
Athlete	Event	Result	Rank	Result	Rank	Result	Rank	Result	Rank
Dean Capobianco	200 metres	20.86	10 Q	20.61	17	Did not advance			
Mark Garner	400 metres	46.26	28 q	46.85	30	Did not advance			
Rob de Castella	Marathon	—N/a						2:17:44	26
Steve Moneghetti	Marathon	—N/a						2:23:42	48
Simon Hollingsworth	400 metres hurdles	49.74	24	—N/a		Did not advance			
Nick A'Hern	20 kilometres walk	—N/a						1:31:39	22
Andrew Jachno	20 kilometres walk	—N/a						1:36:49	31
Simon Baker	50 kilometres walk	—N/a						4:08:11	19

Field events

Athlete	Event	Qualification		Final	
Athlete	Event	Distance	Position	Distance	Position
David Anderson	High jump	2.15	31	Did not advance	
Tim Forsyth	High jump	2.26	14 q	2.34	3rd place, bronze medalist(s)
Lochsley Thomson	High jump	2.20	22	Did not advance	
Simon Arkell	Pole vault	5.30	22	Did not advance	
Dave Culbert	Long jump	8.00	9 q	7.73	11
Werner Reiterer	Discus throw	62.20	5 q	60.12	10
Sean Carlin	Hammer throw	75.90	9 q	76.16	8

Combined events – Decathlon

Athlete	Event	100 m	LJ	SP	HJ	400 m	110H	DT	PV	JT	1500 m	Final	Rank
Dean Barton-Smith	Result	10.97	7.43	13.67	1.91	50.06	15.29	42.54	4.50	60.52	4:46.83	7703	19
Dean Barton-Smith	Points	867	918	708	723	812	815	716	760	746	638	7703	19

Women
Track and road events

Athlete	Event	Heats		Quarterfinal		Semifinal		Final	
Athlete	Event	Result	Rank	Result	Rank	Result	Rank	Result	Rank
Melinda Gainsford	100 metres	11.57	19 Q	11.67	24	Did not advance			
Kerry Johnson	100 metres	11.62	22 Q	11.59	19	Did not advance			
Melinda Gainsford	200 metres	23.13	13 Q	23.08	15 Q	23.08	13	Did not advance	
Melissa Moore	200 metres	23.86	33	Did not advance					
Cathy Freeman	400 metres	53.70	25 Q	51.52	17	Did not advance			
Michelle Lock	400 metres	52.49	11 Q	51.71	13 Q	50.78	11	Did not advance	
Renée Poetschka	400 metres	52.85	15 Q	52.05	15 Q	52.09	15	Did not advance	
Krishna Stanton	3000 metres	9:00.62	22	—N/a				Did not advance	
Sue Hobson	10,000 metres	32:53.61	21	—N/a				Did not advance	
Lisa Ondieki	Marathon	—N/a						DNF	
Gail Luke	400 metres hurdles	58.32	23	—N/a		Did not advance			
Melissa Moore; Melinda Gainsford; Kathy Sambell; Kerry Johnson	4 × 100 metres relay	43.49	7 q	—N/a				43.77	6
Cathy Freeman; Sue Andrews; Renée Poetschka; Michelle Lock	4 × 400 metres relay	3:25.68	5 Q	—N/a				3:26.42	7
Gabrielle Blythe	10 kilometres walk	—N/a						50:13	31
Kerry Saxby-Junna	10 kilometres walk	—N/a						46:01	15

Field events

Athlete	Event	Qualification		Final	
Athlete	Event	Distance	Position	Distance	Position
Alison Inverarity	High jump	1.92	8 Q	1.91	8
Nicole Boegman	Long jump	NM		Did not advance	
Daniela Costian	Discus throw	64.10	6 Q	66.24	3rd place, bronze medalist(s)
Louise McPaul	Javelin throw	60.56	10 q	56.00	11

Combined event – Heptathlon

Athlete	Event	100H	HJ	SP	200 m	LJ	JT	800 m	Total	Rank
Jane Flemming	Result	DNF	DNF							
Jane Flemming	Points	0	DNF							

== Badminton ==
Women

Athlete	Event	Round of 64	Round of 32	Round of 16	Quarterfinals	Semifinals	Final	
Athlete	Event	Opposition Result	Opposition Result	Opposition Result	Opposition Result	Opposition Result	Opposition Result	Rank
Rhonda Cator	Singles	Sanz (ESP); W (11–9, 11–5)	Lee (KOR); L (1–11, 4–11)	Did not advance				
Anna Lao	Singles	Villars (SUI); W' (11–0, 11–4)	Martin (DEN); W (11–6, 12–11)	Rybkina (EUN); W (7–11, 11–7, 11–8)	Tang (CHN); L (9–11, 1–11)	Did not advance		
Rhonda Cator; Anna Lao	Doubles	—N/a	Albrecht / Villars (SUI); W' (15–3, 15–6)	Bąk / Wilk (POL); W (15–3, 15–12)	Lin / Yao (CHN); L (13–18, 5–15)	Did not advance		

== Basketball ==
Summary

Team	Event	Group stage						Quarterfinal	Semifinal	Final / BM	
Team	Event	Opposition Score	Opposition Score	Opposition Score	Opposition Score	Opposition Score	Rank	Opposition Score	Opposition Score	Opposition Score	Rank
Australia men's	Men's tournament	Puerto Rico; W 116–76	Unified Team; L 63–85	Venezuela; W 78–71	China; W 88–66	Lithuania; L 87–98	3 Q	Croatia; L 65–98	Germany; W 109–79	Brazil; L 80–90	6

=== Men's tournament ===
Team roster

Australia men's national basketball team roster
Players
Coaches

Pos.	No.	Name	Age – Date of birth	Height	Club	Ctr.
C	4	John Dorge	29 – 17 October 1962		South East Melbourne Magic	(Australia)
G/F	5	Michael McKay	26 – 15 October 1965		Adelaide 36ers	(Australia)
G	6	Phil Smyth	34 – 11 May 1958		Canberra Cannons	(Australia)
F	7	Larry Sengstock	32 – 4 March 1960		Gold Coast Rollers	(Australia)
G/F	8	Damian Keogh	30 – 1 February 1962		Sydney Kings	(Australia)
G/F	9	Leroy Loggins	34 – 20 December 1957		Brisbane Bullets	(Australia)
G	10	Andrew Gaze	27 – 24 July 1965	2.01 m (6 ft 7 in)	Rex Udine	(Italy)
G	11	Shane Heal	21 – 6 September 1970	1.83 m (6 ft 0 in)	Brisbane Bullets	(Australia)
C	12	Mark Bradtke	22 – 27 September 1969	2.09 m (6 ft 10 in)	Juver Murcia	(Spain)
C	13	Luc Longley	23 – 19 January 1969	2.18 m (7 ft 2 in)	Minnesota Timberwolves	(United States)
F	14	Andrew Vlahov	23 – 1 April 1969	2.00 m (6 ft 7 in)	Perth Wildcats	(Australia)
F/C	15	Ray Borner	30 – 27 May 1962		North Melbourne Giants	(Australia)

Head coach

- (Australia) Adrian Hurley

Legend

- Club – describes last
  club before the competition
- Age – describes age
  on 26 July 1992

Group play

Pos	Team	Pld	W	L	PF	PA	PD	Pts	Qualification
1	Unified Team	5	4	1	425	373	+52	9 (Note: Head-to-head record: Unified Team 1–0 Lithuania)	Quarterfinals
2	Lithuania	5	4	1	481	424	+57	9	Quarterfinals
3	Australia	5	3	2	432	396	+36	8 (Note: Head-to-head record: Australia 1–0 Puerto Rico)	Quarterfinals
4	Puerto Rico	5	3	2	445	440	+5	8	Quarterfinals
5	Venezuela	5	1	4	392	427	−35	6	9th−12th classification round
6	China	5	0	5	381	496	−115	5	9th−12th classification round

Source: FIBA
Rules for classification: 1) points; 2) head-to-head points; 3) head-to-head goal average; 4) head-to-head number of points scored.
Notes:

26 July 1992
14:30
v

Boxscore

Puerto Rico	76–116	Australia
Scoring by half: 31–57, 45–59
Pts: Gause 15; Rebs: de León 13; Asts: Carter 4		Pts: Bradtke, Gaze 20; Rebs: Loggins, Vlahov 7 Asts: Longley 5

Palau Municipal d'Esports de Badalona, Barcelona

27 July 1992
16:30
v

Boxscore

Unified Team	85–63	Australia
Scoring by half: 35–51, 50–12
Pts: Volkov 15; Rebs: Belostenny 7 Asts: Bazarevich 7		Pts: Gaze 17; Rebs: Longley 5 Asts: Longley 2

Palau Municipal d'Esports de Badalona, Barcelona

29 July 1992
9:30
v

Boxscore

Venezuela	71–78	Australia
Scoring by half: 27–43, 44–35
Pts: Olivares 22; Rebs: Walcott 11; Asts: Estaba 4		Pts: Bradtke 16; Rebs: Bradtke 9 Asts: Gaze 7

Palau Municipal d'Esports de Badalona, Barcelona

31 July 1992
14:30
v

Boxscore

Australia	88–66	China
Scoring by half: 39–28, 49–38
Pts: Gaze 30; Rebs: Bradtke 7 Asts: Gaze, Longley 4		Pts: Hu 15; Rebs: Wang 5 Asts: Sun F. 6

Palau Municipal d'Esports de Badalona, Barcelona

2 August 1992
16:30
v

Boxscore

Australia	87–98	Lithuania
Scoring by half: 46–45, 41–53
Pts: Gaze 16; Rebs: Bradtke 12; Asts: Gaze 3		Pts: Sabonis 26; Rebs: Einikis 10; Asts: Marčiulionis 8

Palau Municipal d'Esports de Badalona, Barcelona

Quarterfinal

4 August 1992
14:30
v

Boxscore

Croatia	98–65	Australia
Scoring by half: 41–31, 57–34
Pts: Petrović 25; Rebs: Rađa 11; Asts: Kukoč 11		Pts: Gaze 16; Rebs: Bradtke, Vlahov 5 Asts: Bradtke, Vlahov 2

Palau Municipal d'Esports de Badalona, Barcelona

Classification 5th-8th place

6 August 1992
20:30
v

Boxscore

Australia	109–79	Germany
Scoring by half: 52–44, 57–35
Pts: Gaze 30; Rebs: Bradtke 11; Asts: Smyth 6		Pts: Jackel 19; Rebs: Gnad 11; Asts: Schrempf 5

Palau Municipal d'Esports de Badalona, Barcelona

5th place match

8 August 1992
11:00
v

Boxscore

Brazil	90–80	Australia
Scoring by half: 44–38, 46–42
Pts: Schmidt 23; Rebs: Victalino 12; Asts: Maury 11		Pts: Gaze 26; Rebs: Bradtke, Longley 6 Asts: Gaze, Longley 4

Palau Municipal d'Esports de Badalona, Barcelona

== Boxing ==
Athlete	Event	Round of 32	Round of 16	Quarterfinals	Semifinals	Final	
Athlete	Event	Opposition Result	Opposition Result	Opposition Result	Opposition Result	Opposition Result	Rank
Robbie Peden	Flyweight	O'Donnell (CAN); W 14–2	Sheikh (ALG); W KO	Choi (PRK); L 11–25	Did not advance		
Jamie Nicolson	Featherweight	Dumitrescu (ROU); L RSC R2	Did not advance				
Justin Rowsell	Lightweight	Snarski (POL); L RSC R3	Did not advance				
Stefan Scriggins	Welterweight	Moniz (ANG); W 6–2	Acevedo (PUR); L 3–16	Did not advance			
Justann Crawford	Middleweight	Lebzyak (EUN); L RSC R3	Did not advance				
Rick Timperi	Light heavyweight	Raforme (SEY); L 7–27	Did not advance				

== Canoeing ==
=== Slalom ===
Athlete	Event	Run 1	Rank	Run 2	Rank	Best	Rank
Peter Eckhardt	Men's C-1	128.98	14	165.74	27	128.98	20
Andrew Wilson; Matthew Pallister	Men's C-2	160.71	15	156.67	14	156.67	16
Danielle Woodward	Women's K-1	151.54	15	128.27	2	128.27	2nd place, silver medalist(s)

=== Sprint ===
Men

Athlete	Event	Heats		Repechage		Semifinals		Final	
Athlete	Event	Time	Rank	Time	Rank	Time	Rank	Time	Rank
Martin Hunter	K-1 500 metres	1:43.32	4 R	1:42.00	4	Did not advance			
Clint Robinson	K-1 1000 metres	3:38.80	1 SF	Bye		3:36.59	2 Q	3:37.26	1st place, gold medalist(s)
Danny Collins; Andrew Trim	K-2 500 metres	1:36.07	4 R	1:32.47	2 SF	1:31.99	6	Did not advance	
Danny Collins; Andrew Trim	K-2 1000 metres	3:24.02	5 R	3:20.18	4	Did not advance			
Kelvin Graham; Ian Rowling; Steven Wood; Ramon Andersson	K-4 1000 metres	2:57.06	1 SF	—N/a		2:58.83	3 Q	2:56.97	3rd place, bronze medalist(s)

Women

Athlete	Event	Heats		Repechage		Semifinals		Final	
Athlete	Event	Time	Rank	Time	Rank	Time	Rank	Time	Rank
Anna Wood; Kerri Randle	K-2 500 metres	1:44.76	4 Q	—N/a		1:44.05	7	Did not advance	
Denise Cooper; Lynda Lehmann; Gayle Mayes; Anna Wood	K-4 500 metres	1:39.32	6 SF	—N/a		1:39.81	3 q	1:43.88	8

== Cycling ==
Sixteen cyclists, thirteen men and three women, represented Australia in 1992.

=== Road ===
Men

Athlete	Event	Time	Rank
Patrick Jonker	Road race	DNF	
Grant Rice	Road race	4:35:56	10
Darren Smith	Road race	4:35:56	16
Robert Crowe; Darren Lawson; Robert McLachlan; Grant Rice	Team time trial	2:09:12	12

Women

Athlete	Event	Time	Rank
Kathleen Shannon	Road race	2:05:03	7
Jacqui Uttien	Road race	2:05:03	13
Kathy Watt	Road race	2:04:42	1st place, gold medalist(s)

=== Track ===
Sprint

Athlete	Event	Qualification		Round 1	Repechage		Round 2	Repechage 2	Quarterfinals	Semifinals	Final	
Athlete	Event	Qualification		Round 1	Round 1	Round 2	Round 2	Repechage 2	Quarterfinals	Semifinals	Final	
Athlete	Event	Time Speed (km/h)	Rank	Opposition Time Speed (km/h)	Opposition Time Speed (km/h)	Opposition Time Speed (km/h)	Opposition Time Speed (km/h)	Opposition Time Speed (km/h)	Opposition Time Speed (km/h)	Opposition Time Speed (km/h)	Opposition Time Speed (km/h)	Rank
Gary Neiwand	Men's sprint	10.330	2 Q	González (COL), van Hameren (NED); W 11.319	Bye		Magné (FRA), Chiappa (ITA); W 11.112	Bye	Lovito (ARG); W, W	Harnett (CAN); W, W	Fiedler (GER); L, L	2nd place, silver medalist(s)

Time trial

Athlete	Event	Time	Rank
Shane Kelly	Time trial	1:04.288	2nd place, silver medalist(s)

Pursuit

Athlete	Event	Qualification		Quarterfinals	Semifinals	Final	
Athlete	Event	Time	Rank	Opposition Time	Opposition Time	Opposition Time	Rank
Mark Kingsland	Men's individual pursuit	4:31.033	3 Q	Sundquist (USA); W 4:29.173	Boardman (GBR); L 4:32.716	Did not advance	4
Kathy Watt	Women's individual pursuit	3:41.886 WR	1 Q	Vikstedt-Nyman (FIN); W 3:45.305	Twigg (USA); W 3:49.790	Roßner (GER); L 3:43.438	2nd place, silver medalist(s)
Brett Aitken; Stephen McGlede; Shaun O'Brien; Stuart O'Grady	Men's team pursuit	4:11.245 WR	1 Q	Czechoslovakia; W 4:10.438 WR	Italy; W 4:15.705	Germany; L 4:10.218	2nd place, silver medalist(s)

Points race

Athlete	Event	Qualification			Final		
Athlete	Event	Laps	Points	Rank	Laps	Points	Rank
Stephen McGlede	Points race	0 laps	16	1 Q	DNF		

== Diving ==
Men

Athlete	Event	Qualification		Final	
Athlete	Event	Points	Rank	Points	Rank
Simon McCormack	3 m springboard	358.05	16	Did not advance	
Michael Murphy	3 m springboard	381.33	8 Q	611.97	4
Michael Murphy	10 m platform	371.88	13	Did not advance	
Craig Rogerson	10 m platform	388.83	10 Q	458.43	12

Women

Athlete	Event	Qualification		Final	
Athlete	Event	Points	Rank	Points	Rank
Jenny Donnet	3 m springboard	272.64	15	Did not advance	
Rachel Wilkes	3 m springboard	254.31	22	Did not advance	
April Adams	10 m platform	290.73	10 Q	342.39	11
Vyninka Arlow	10 m platform	289.14	11 Q	365.88	10

== Equestrianism ==
=== Dressage ===
Athlete	Horse	Event	Qualification		Final	
Athlete	Horse	Event	Score	Rank	Score	Rank
Christine Doan	Dondolo	Individual	1491	28	Did not advance	

=== Eventing ===
Athlete	Horse	Event	Dressage		Cross-country			Jumping			Total	
Athlete	Horse	Event	Penalties	Rank	Penalties	Total	Rank	Penalties	Total	Rank	Penalties	Rank
David Green	Duncan II	Individual	56.20	16	DNF							
Andrew Hoy	Kiwi	Individual	58.80	23	25.60	84.40	6	5.00	89.40	9	89.40	5
Gillian Rolton	Peppermint Grove	Individual	64.20	38	60.00	124.20	31	5.00	129.20	9	129.20	23
Matt Ryan	Kibah Tic Toc	Individual	57.80	18	7.20	65.00	1	5.00	70.00	9	70.00	1st place, gold medalist(s)
David Green; Andrew Hoy; Gillian Rolton; Matt Ryan	See above	Team	172.80	6	92.80	273.60	2	15.00	288.60	1	288.60	1st place, gold medalist(s)

== Fencing ==
Individual
Pool stage

Athlete	Event	Group Stage						
Athlete	Event	Opposition Result	Opposition Result	Opposition Result	Opposition Result	Opposition Result	Opposition Result	Rank
Scott Arnold	Men's épée	Borrmann (GER); L 1–5	Lenglet (FRA); L 1–5	Lee (KOR); L 0–5	Ječmínek (TCH); L 3–5	El-Khoury (LBN); W 5–2	Strydom (RSA); L 5–4	54
Robert Davidson	Men's épée	Kovács (HUN); L 4–5	Kaaberma (EST); W 5–4	Chang (KOR); W 5–4	Normile (USA); W 5–4	Tan (SGP); W 5–1	Gadomski (POL); L 1–5	26 Q

Elimination phase

Athlete	Event	Round 1	Round 2	Round 3	Round 4	Repechage				Quarterfinals	Semifinals	Final	
Athlete	Event	Round 1	Round 2	Round 3	Round 4	Round 1	Round 2	Round 3	Round 4	Quarterfinals	Semifinals	Final	
Athlete	Event	Opposition Result	Opposition Result	Opposition Result	Opposition Result	Opposition Result	Opposition Result	Opposition Result	Opposition Result	Opposition Result	Opposition Result	Opposition Result	Rank
Robert Davidson	Men's épée	Paz (COL); W 2–0	Vánky (SWE); L 1–2	—N/a		Pop (ROU); W 2–1	Shong (CAN); L 1–2	Did not advance					

== Football ==
Summary

Key:

- W – Win L – Lose D – Draw
- A.E.T. – After extra time.
- P – Match decided by penalty-shootout.

Team	Event	Group stage				Quarterfinal	Semifinal	Final / BM	
Team	Event	Opposition Score	Opposition Score	Opposition Score	Rank	Opposition Score	Opposition Score	Opposition Score	Rank
Australia men's	Men's tournament	Ghana; L 1–3	Mexico; D 1–1	Denmark; W 3–0	2 Q	Sweden; W 2–1	Poland; L 1–6	Ghana; L 0–1	4

=== Men's tournament ===
Team roster

Head coach: Eddie Thomson

No.	Pos.	Player	DoB	Age	Caps	Club	Tournament games	Tournament goals	Minutes played	Sub off	Sub on	Cards yellow/red
1	GK	John Filan	8 February 1970	22	?	(Australia) St George Saints
2	DF	Milan Blagojevic	24 December 1969	22	?	(Australia) Marconi Stallions
3	DF	Dominic Longo	23 August 1970	21	?	(Australia) Newcastle Breakers
4	DF	Ned Zelic	4 July 1971	21	?	(Australia) Sydney Olympic FC
5	DF	Shaun Murphy	5 November 1970	21	?	(Australia) Heidelberg SC
6	DF	Tony Vidmar	4 July 1970	22	?	(Australia) Adelaide City
7	MF	John Gibson	10 February 1970	22	?	(Australia) A.P.I.A. Leichhardt Tigers
8	MF	Paul Okon	5 April 1972	20	?	(Belgium) Club Brugge K.V.
9	FW	Zlatko Arambasic	20 September 1969	22	?	(Belgium) KV Mechelen
10	MF	George Slifkas	18 October 1969	22	?	(Australia) Heidelberg SC
11	FW	John Markovski	15 April 1970	22	?	(Australia) Marconi Stallions
12	MF	Damian Mori	30 September 1970	21	?	(Australia) Melbourne Croatia
13	FW	Carl Veart	21 May 1970	22	?	(Australia) Adelaide City
14	FW	Steve Refenes	19 February 1970	22	?	(Australia) Sydney Olympic FC
15	DF	Tony Popovic	4 July 1973	19	?	(Australia) Sydney Croatia
16	FW	David Seal	26 January 1972	20	?	(Australia) Marconi Stallions
17	FW	Gary Hasler	5 July 1970	22	?	(Australia) Sunshine George Cross FC
18	MF	Steve Corica	24 March 1973	19	?	(Australia) Marconi Stallions
19	MF	Brad Maloney	19 January 1972	20	?	(Australia) Newcastle Breakers
20	GK	Mark Bosnich	13 January 1972	20	?	(Australia) Sydney Croatia

Group play

Team	Pld	W	D	L	GF	GA	GD	Pts
Ghana	3	1	2	0	4	2	+2	4
Australia	3	1	1	1	5	4	+1	3
Mexico	3	0	3	0	3	3	0	3
Denmark	3	0	2	1	1	4	−3	2

Source: FIFA
26 July 1992
19:00

Ghana	3–1	Australia
Gargo 12'; Ayew 83', 89'	Report	Vidmar 91'

Estadi de la Nova Creu Alta, Sabadell
Attendance: 4,000
Referee: Ali Bujsaim (United Arab Emirates)

28 July 1992
21:00

Mexico	1–1	Australia
Castañeda 63'	Report	Arambasic 20'

Estadi de Sarrià, Barcelona
Attendance: 10,000
Referee: Kiichiro Tachi (Japan)

30 July 1992
19:00

Denmark	0–3	Australia
	Report	Markovski 32'; Mori 60'; Vidmar 75'

Estadio La Romareda, Zaragoza
Attendance: 3,000
Referee: Fabio Baldas (Italy)

Quarterfinal

2 August 1992
21:30

Sweden	1–2	Australia
Andersson 60'	Report	Markovski 30'; Murphy 53'

Camp Nou, Barcelona
Attendance: 30,000
Referee: Brizio Carter (MEX)

Semifinal

5 August 1992
21:30

Poland	6–1	Australia
Kowalczyk 27', 88'; Juskowiak 43', 52', 78'; Murphy 67' (o.g.)	Report	Veart 35'

Camp Nou, Barcelona
Attendance: 45,000
Referee: Rezende de Freitas (BRA)

Bronze medal match

7 August 1992
20:00

Australia	0–1	Ghana
	Report	Asare 19'

Camp Nou, Barcelona
Attendance: 15,000
Referee: Díaz Vega (ESP)

== Gymnastics ==
=== Artistic ===
==== Men ====
Individual

Athlete	Event	Qualification							
Athlete	Event	Apparatus						Total	Rank
Athlete	Event	F	PH	R	V	PB	HB	Total	Rank
Brennon Dowrick	Individual	18.550	18.825	18.850	18.875	18.500	19.125	112.725	61

==== Women ====
Team

Athlete	Event	Qualification					
Athlete	Event	Apparatus				Total	Rank
Athlete	Event	V	UB	BB	F	Total	Rank
Monique Allen	Team	19.487	19.649	19.475	18.937	77.548	39 q
Brooke Gysen	Team	19.375	19.312	18.349	19.275	76.311	69
Julie-Anne Monico	Team	19.312	19.674	18.937	18.437	76.360	68
Lisa Read	Team	19.249	19.712	19.462	19.512	77.935	33 Q
Kylie Shadbolt	Team	19.474	19.549	18.899	19.274	77.196	46 q
Jane Warrilow	Team	19.325	19.487	19.037	19.200	77.049	51
Total	Team	97.160	98.134	95.860	96.348	387.502	7

Individual finals

Athlete	Event	Apparatus				Total	Rank
Athlete	Event	V	UB	BB	F	Total	Rank
Monique Allen	All-around	9.737	9.775	9.837	9.737	39.086	19
Lisa Read	All-around	9.662	9.750	9.837	9.362	38.611	30
Kylie Shadbolt	All-around	9.650	9.637	8.975	9.287	37.549	36

== Hockey ==
Summary

Key:

- FT – After full time.
- P – Match decided by penalty-shootout.

Team	Event	Group stage						Semifinal	Final / BM	
Team	Event	Opposition Score	Opposition Score	Opposition Score	Opposition Score	Opposition Score	Rank	Opposition Score	Opposition Score	Rank
Australia men's	Men's tournament	Argentina; W 7–0	Egypt; W 5–1	Germany; D 1–1	India; W 1–0	Great Britain; W 6–0	2 Q	Netherlands; W 3–2	Germany; L 1–2	2nd place, silver medalist(s)
Australia women's	Women's tournament	Canada; W 2–0	Germany; L 0–1	Spain; L 0–1	—N/a		3	New Zealand; W 5–1	Netherlands; W 2–0	5

=== Men's tournament ===
Team roster

- Warren Birmingham
- David Wansbrough
- John Bestall
- Lee Bodimeade
- Ashley Carey
- Stephen Davies
- Damon Diletti
- Lachlan Dreher
- Lachlan Elmer
- Dean Evans
- Greg Corbitt
- Paul Lewis
- Graham Reid
- Jay Stacy
- Ken Wark
- Michael York

Group play

Pos	Team	Pld	W	D	L	GF	GA	GD	Pts	Qualification
1	Australia	5	4	1	0	20	2	+18	9	Semi-finals
2	Germany	5	4	1	0	16	4	+12	9	Semi-finals
3	Great Britain	5	3	0	2	7	10	−3	6	5–8th place semi-finals
4	India	5	2	0	3	4	8	−4	4	5–8th place semi-finals
5	Argentina	5	1	0	4	3	12	−9	2	9–12th place semi-finals
6	Egypt	5	0	0	5	4	18	−14	0	9–12th place semi-finals

Source: FIH

26 July 1992
09:45

Australia	7–0	Argentina
Wansbrough 24', 28', 60'; Lewis 30'; Davies 52', 64'; Stacy 69'	Report

Umpires:
Jose Gortazar (ESP)
Guillaume Langle (FRA)

28 July 1992
16:00

Australia	5–1	Egypt
Stacy 14'; Bodimeade 22', 70+'; Birmingham 37'; Lewis 45'	Report	Magdy 2'

Umpires:
Peter von Reth (NED)
Santiago Deo (ESP)

30 July 1992
18:00

Australia	1–1	Germany
Davies 22'	Report	Fischer 53'

Umpires:
Kiyoshi Sana (JPN)
Santiago Deo (ESP)

1 August 1992
20:00

Australia	1–0	India
Stacy 3'	Report

Umpires:
Jose Gortazar (ESP)
Adriano de Vecchi (ITA)

3 August 1992
10:15

Great Britain	0–6	Australia
	Report	Birmingham 3', 36'; Stacy 30', 67'; Davies 43', 45'

Umpires:
Alain Renaud (FRA)
Kiyoshi Sana (JPN)

Semifinal

5 August 1992
17:00

Australia	3–2	Netherlands
Lewis 3'; Bodimeade 25'; Wark 37'	Report	Bovelander 19', 61'

Umpires:
Santiago Deo (ESP)
Patrick van Beneden (BEL)

Gold medal match

8 August 1992
19:30

Australia	1–2	Germany
Corbitt 66'	Report	Hilgers 2', 59'

Umpires:
Eduardo Ruiz (ARG)
Santiago Deo (ESP)

=== Women's tournament ===
Team roster

The following players represented Australia:

Head coach: (Australia) Brian Glencross

No.	Pos.	Player	Date of birth (age)	Caps	Club
1		Kathleen Partridge	7 December 1963 (aged 28)		
2		Christine Dobson	24 November 1966 (aged 25)		
3		Liane Tooth	13 March 1962 (aged 30)		
4		Alyson Annan	12 June 1973 (aged 19)		
5		Juliet Haslam	31 May 1969 (aged 23)		
6		Michelle Hager	3 October 1966 (aged 25)		
7		Alison Peek	12 October 1969 (aged 22)		
8		Lisa Powell	8 July 1970 (aged 22)		
9		Lisa Naughton	2 April 1963 (aged 29)		
10		Kate Starre	18 September 1971 (aged 20)		
11		Sally Carbon	14 April 1967 (aged 25)		
12		Jackie Pereira	29 October 1964 (aged 27)		
13		Tracey Belbin	24 June 1967 (aged 25)		
14		Rechelle Hawkes	30 May 1967 (aged 25)		
15		Sharon Buchanan	12 March 1963 (aged 29)		
16		Debbie Sullivan	4 July 1963 (aged 29)		

Group play

Teams	Pld	W	D	L	GF	GA	GD	Pts
Germany	3	2	1	0	7	2	+5	5
Spain	3	2	1	0	5	3	+2	5
Australia	3	1	0	2	2	2	0	2
Canada	3	0	0	3	1	8	−7	0

27 July 1992
16:00

Australia	2–0	Canada
Tooth 40'; Haslam 60'	Report

Umpires:
Dominique Ache (BEL)
Lee Mi-ok (KOR)

29 July 1992
17:30

Australia	0–1	Germany
	Report	Becker 65'

Umpires:
Laura Crespo (ARG)
Dominique Ache (BEL)

2 August 1992
18:00

Canada	0–4	Germany
	Report	Dickenscheid 12'; Hentschel 16', 57'; Becker 22'

Umpires:
Renee Chatas (USA)
Dominique Ache (BEL)

Classification 5th-8th place

4 August 1992
09:30

Australia	5–1	New Zealand
Pereira 2', 12', 44'; Hager 14'; Hawkes 57'	Report	Clinton 53'

Umpires:
Lee Mi-ok (KOR)
Salobrar Hernandez (ESP)

5th place match

6 August 1992
17:30

Australia	2–0	Netherlands
Powell 49'; Annan 50'	Report

Umpires:
Jane Robertson (GBR)
Margaret Lanning (CAN)

== Judo ==
Men

Athlete	Event	Round of 64	Round of 32	Round of 16	Quarterfinals	Semifinals	Repechage			Final	
Athlete	Event	Round of 64	Round of 32	Round of 16	Quarterfinals	Semifinals	Round 1	Round 2	Round 3	Final	
Athlete	Event	Opposition Result	Opposition Result	Opposition Result	Opposition Result	Opposition Result	Opposition Result	Opposition Result	Opposition Result	Opposition Result	Rank
Chris Bacon	86 kg	Bye	Castropil (BRA); W Yuko	Okada (JPN); L Ippon	Did not advance						

Women

Athlete	Event	Round of 32	Round of 16	Quarterfinals	Semifinals	Repechage			Final	
Athlete	Event	Round of 32	Round of 16	Quarterfinals	Semifinals	Round 1	Round 2	Round 3	Final	
Athlete	Event	Opposition Result	Opposition Result	Opposition Result	Opposition Result	Opposition Result	Opposition Result	Opposition Result	Opposition Result	Rank
Cathy Grainger	52 kg	Bye	Li (CHN); L Yuko	Did not advance		Bevilacqua (BRA); L Yuko	Did not advance			

== Modern Pentathlon ==
Three male pentathletes represented Australia in 1992.

Athlete	Event	Fencing (épée one touch)			Swimming (300 m freestyle)			Shooting (Air pistol)			Riding (show jumping)			Running (4000 m)			Total points	Final rank
Athlete	Event	Results	Rank	MP points	Time	Rank	MP points	Points	Rank	MP Points	Penalties	Rank	MP points	Time	Rank	MP Points	Total points	Final rank
Colin Hamilton	Individual	13-52	65	439	3:22.7	23	1252	180	47	970	320	54	780	13:24.4	18	1153	4594	58
Gavin Lackey	Individual	28–37	49	694	3:20.1	13	1272	179	48	955	132	32	968	13:01.4	7	1222	5111	30
Alex Watson	Individual	25–40	55	643	3:32.2	53	1176	184	33	1030	142	35	958	17:11.5	66	472	4279	63
Colin Hamilton; Gavin Lackey; Alex Watson	Team	66–129	17	1776	10:16.0	8	3700	543	13	2955	594	10	2706	43:37.3	16	2847	13984	16

== Rowing ==
Men

Athlete	Event	Heats		Repechage		Semifinals		Final	
Athlete	Event	Time	Rank	Time	Rank	Time	Rank	Time	Rank
Steve Hawkins; Peter Antonie	Double sculls	6:24.93	1 SF	Bye		6:20.22	1 FA	6:17.32	1st place, gold medalist(s)
Richard Powell; Hamish McGlashan; Robin Bakker; Jason Day	Quadruple sculls	5:49.15	3 SF	Bye		5:55.62	5 FB	5:56.44	9
Nick McDonald-Crowley; Matthew McArdle	Coxless pair	6:48.18	4 R	6:48.67	3 FC	—N/a		6:44.06	13
Andrew Cooper; Mike McKay; Nick Green; James Tomkins	Coxless four	5:59.18	1 SF	Bye		5:58.26	1 FA	5:55.04	1st place, gold medalist(s)
Simon Spriggs; Peter Murphy; Wayne Diplock; Jaime Fernandez; Ben Dodwell; Sam Patten; Bo Hanson; Robert Scott; David Colvin	Eight	5:34.28	2 SF	Bye		5:35.76	3 FA	5:33.72	5

Women

Athlete	Event	Heats		Repechage		Semifinals		Final	
Athlete	Event	Time	Rank	Time	Rank	Time	Rank	Time	Rank
Andrea Coss	Single sculls	7:58.51	4 R	DNF FC		—N/a		8:13.46	14
Jennifer Luff; Gillian Campbell	Double sculls	7:24.14	3 SF	Bye		7:07.00	4 FB	7:05.91	8
Jodie Dobson; Emmy Snook; Megan Still; Kate Slatter	Coxless four	6:58.34	3 R	6:54.16	2 FA	—N/a		6:41.72	6

== Sailing ==
Men

Athlete	Event	Race										Net points	Final rank
Athlete	Event	1	2	3	4	5	6	7	8	9	10	Net points	Final rank
Lars Kleppich	Lechner A-390	11.7	10	13	8	13	~~15~~	14	3	13	13	98.7	3rd place, bronze medalist(s)
Glenn Bourke	Finn	22	22	~~36~~	20	25	17	23	—N/a			129	20

Women

Athlete	Event	Race										Net points	Final rank
Athlete	Event	1	2	3	4	5	6	7	8	9	10	Net points	Final rank
Fiona Taylor	Lechner A-390	13	13	14	14	17	~~21~~	18	14	20	13	136	10
Christine Bridge	Europe	~~26~~	16	23	20	24	25	24	—N/a			132	20
Addy Bucek; Jeni Lidgett	470	~~24~~	16	18	11.7	10	5.7	19	—N/a			80.4	9

Open
Fleet racing

Athlete	Event	Race							Net points	Final rank
Athlete	Event	1	2	3	4	5	6	7	Net points	Final rank
John Forbes; Mitch Booth	Tornado	~~16~~	8	11.7	11.7	3	0	10	44.4	3rd place, bronze medalist(s)
Colin Beashel; David Giles	Star	~~18~~	16	11.7	15	10	5.7	13	71.4	7

Match racing

Athlete	Event	Qualification races						Total	Rank
Michael Mottl; Tim Dorning; William Hodder	Soling	13	5.7	17	~~26~~	26	17	78.7	11

== Shooting ==
Men

Athlete	Event	Qualification		Final	
Athlete	Event	Points	Rank	Points	Rank
Phil Adams	50 metre pistol	549	30	Did not advance	
Phil Adams	10 metre air pistol	576	19	Did not advance	
Patrick Murray	25 metre rapid fire pistol	574	26	Did not advance	
Ben Sandstrom	50 metre pistol	551	26	Did not advance	
Ben Sandstrom	10 metre air pistol	573	29	Did not advance	

Women

Athlete	Event	Qualification		Final	
Athlete	Event	Points	Rank	Points	Rank
Lynne-Marie Freh	25 metre pistol	581	6 Q	675	7
Lynne-Marie Freh	10 metre air pistol	371	39	Did not advance	

Open

Athlete	Event	Qualification		Final	
Athlete	Event	Points	Rank	Points	Rank
John Summers	Skeet	195	21	Did not advance	
Michael Diamond	Trap	193	11	Did not advance	
Russell Mark	Trap	193	9	Did not advance	

== Swimming ==
Men

Athlete	Event	Heats		Final A/B	
Athlete	Event	Time	Rank	Time	Rank
Andrew Baildon	100 metre freestyle	50.59	14 FB	50.93	16
Andrew Baildon	100 metre butterfly	54.82	17	Did not advance	
Ian Brown	200 metre freestyle	1:49.32	11 FB	1:49.77	11
Ian Brown	400 metre freestyle	3:50.12	6 FA	3:48.79	5
Philip Bryant	400 metre individual medley	4:21.45	10 FB	4:22.36	13
Matt Dunn	200 metre individual medley	2:02.75	8 FA	2:02.79	7
Matt Dunn	400 metre individual medley	4:27.65	18	Did not advance	
Chris Fydler	100 metre freestyle	50.26	10 FB	50.78	14
Toby Haenen	100 metre backstroke	1:00.08	45	Did not advance	
Toby Haenen	200 metre backstroke	2:06.79	35	Did not advance	
Glen Housman	1500 metre freestyle	15:11.36	3 FA	14:55.29	2nd place, silver medalist(s)
Darren Lange	50 metre freestyle	23.01	13 FB	22.69	9
Rodney Lawson	200 metre breaststroke	2:15.67	13 FB	2:15.50	9
Shane Lewis	100 metre breaststroke	1:04.17	28	Did not advance	
Simon McKillop-Davies	200 metre butterfly	2:00.92	13 FB	2:01.86	14
Kieren Perkins	200 metre freestyle	1:49.26	10 FB	1:49.75	10
Kieren Perkins	400 metre freestyle	3:49.24	1 FA	3:45.16	2nd place, silver medalist(s)
Kieren Perkins	1500 metre freestyle	15:02.75	1 FA	14:43.48	1st place, gold medalist(s)
Martin Roberts	200 metre butterfly	1:58.91	4 FA	1:59.64	8
Martin Roberts	200 metre individual medley	DQ		Did not advance	
Phil Rogers	100 metre breaststroke	1:02.10	7 FA	1:01.76	3rd place, bronze medalist(s)
Phil Rogers	200 metre breaststroke	2:14.39	6 FA	2:13.59	6
Jon Sieben	100 metre butterfly	54.67	14 FB	54.73	10
Tom Stachewicz	100 metre backstroke	57.03	19	Did not advance	
Angus Waddell	50 metre freestyle	23.10	14 FB	23.06	15
Chris Fydler; Andrew Baildon; Tom Stachewicz; Darren Lange	4 × 100 metre freestyle relay	3:22.24	8 FA	3:22.04	8
Ian Brown; Deane Pieters; Kieren Perkins; Duncan Armstrong; Martin Roberts (heats)	4 × 200 metre freestyle relay	7:22.19	4 FA	DQ	
Tom Stachewicz; Phil Rogers; Jon Sieben; Chris Fydler	4 × 100 metre medley relay	3:43.78	7 FA	3:42.65	7

Women

Athlete	Event	Heats		Final A/B	
Athlete	Event	Time	Rank	Time	Rank
Lisa Curry-Kenny	50 metre freestyle	26.07	11 FB	25.87	9
Lisa Curry-Kenny	100 metre butterfly	1:01.07	9 FB	1:01.61	13
Linley Frame	100 metre breaststroke	1:11.58	15 FB	1:11.36	15
Linley Frame	200 metre breaststroke	2:34.73	19	Did not advance	
Leigh Habler	200 metre backstroke	2:13.44	7 FA	2:13.68	8
Hayley Lewis	400 metre freestyle	4:12.95	5 FA	4:11.22	3rd place, bronze medalist(s)
Hayley Lewis	800 metre freestyle	8:33.04	2 FA	8:30.34	2nd place, silver medalist(s)
Hayley Lewis	200 metre butterfly	2:14.50	10 FB	2:13.11	9
Hayley Lewis	400 metre individual medley	4:46.57	6 FA	4:43.75	4
Julie McDonald	400 metre freestyle	4:20.16	18	Did not advance	
Julie McDonald	800 metre freestyle	8:51.59	15	Did not advance	
Jacqui McKenzie	200 metre individual medley	2:17.82	11 FB	2:19.41	15
Jacqui McKenzie	400 metre individual medley	4:51.80	13 FB	4:52.04	16
Joanne Meehan	100 metre backstroke	1:02.84	8 FA	1:02.07	6
Susie O'Neill	100 metre freestyle	56.58	13 FB	56.68	15
Susie O'Neill	200 metre freestyle	2:01.05	9 FB	2:00.89	11
Susie O'Neill	100 metre butterfly	59.95	3 FA	59.69	5
Susie O'Neill	200 metre butterfly	2:10.47	1 FA	2:09.03	3rd place, bronze medalist(s)
Elli Overton	200 metre individual medley	2:15.13	2 FA	2:15.76	5
Sam Riley	100 metre breaststroke	1:09.38	3 FA	1:09.25	3rd place, bronze medalist(s)
Sam Riley	200 metre breaststroke	2:32.09	11 FB	2:32.63	12
Nicole Stevenson	200 metre freestyle	2:02.50	15 FB	2:04.21	16
Nicole Stevenson	100 metre backstroke	1:02.54	6 FA	1:01.78	4
Nicole Stevenson	200 metre backstroke	2:12.32	5 FA	2:10.20	3rd place, bronze medalist(s)
Karen Van Wirdum	50 metre freestyle	26.80	25	Did not advance	
Karen Van Wirdum	100 metre freestyle	58.75	28	Did not advance	
Angela Mullens; Lise Mackie; Nicole Stevenson; Lisa Curry-Kenny	4 × 100 metre freestyle relay	3:49.64	9	Did not advance	
Nicole Stevenson; Sam Riley; Susie O'Neill; Lisa Curry-Kenny; Joanne Meehan (heats)	4 × 100 metre medley relay	4:12.54	7 FA	4:07.01	5

== Synchronized Swimming ==
Two synchronized swimmers represented Australia in 1992.

Athlete	Event	Figures		Qualification			Final		
Athlete	Event	Points	Rank	Points	Total (Figures + Qualification)	Rank	Points	Total (Figures + Final)	Rank
Celeste Ferraris	Solo	82.330	41	Did not advance					
Semon Rohloff	Solo	81.769	44 Q	90.200	171.969	18	Did not advance		
Celeste Ferraris; Semon Rohloff	Duet	82.049	15	88.880	170.929	16	Did not advance		

== Table Tennis ==
Women

Athlete	Event	Group Stage				Round of 16	Quarterfinal	Semifinal	Final	
Athlete	Event	Opposition Result	Opposition Result	Opposition Result	Rank	Opposition Result	Opposition Result	Opposition Result	Opposition Result	Rank
Kerri Tepper	Singles	Lee (KOR); L 0–2	Chai (HKG); L 0–2	Touati (TUN); W 2–0	3	Did not advance				
Kerri Tepper; Ying Kwok	Doubles	Perkučin / Fazlić (IOA); L 0–2	Vriesekoop / Hooman-Kloppenburg (NED); L 0–2	Kosaka / Doti (BRA); W 2–0	3	Did not advance				

== Tennis ==
Men

Athlete	Event	Round of 64	Round of 32	Round of 16	Quarterfinals	Semifinals	Final	
Athlete	Event	Opposition Result	Opposition Result	Opposition Result	Opposition Result	Opposition Result	Opposition Result	Rank
Richard Fromberg	Singles	Stich (GER); L (3–6, 6–3, 1–6, 6–3, 3–6)	Did not advance					
Wally Masur	Singles	Sampras (USA); L (1–6, 6–7, 4–6)	Did not advance					
Todd Woodbridge	Singles	Sánchez (ESP); L (1–6, 6–7, 2–6)	Did not advance					
John Fitzgerald; Todd Woodbridge	Doubles	—N/a	Knowles / Smith (BAH); W (6–2, 6–3, 6–7, 4–6, 6–3)	Krishnan / Paes (IND); L (4–6, 5–7, 6–4, 1–6)	Did not advance			

Women

Athlete	Event	Round of 64	Round of 32	Round of 16	Quarterfinals	Semifinals	Final	
Athlete	Event	Opposition Result	Opposition Result	Opposition Result	Opposition Result	Opposition Result	Opposition Result	Rank
Jenny Byrne	Singles	Reggi (ITA); L (4–6, 6–7)	Did not advance					
Rachel McQuillan	Singles	Appelmans (BEL); L (3–6, 3–6)	Did not advance					
Nicole Provis	Singles	Piccolini (ITA); W (6–1, 6–0)	Appelmans (BEL); L (1–6, 2–6)	Did not advance				
Rachel McQuillan; Nicole Provis	Doubles	—N/a	Gavaldón / Novelo (MEX); W (5–7, 6–3, 6–1)	Chabalgoity / Vieira (BRA); W (6–2, 6–1)	Novotná / Strnadová (TCH); W (6–3, 6–3)	Martínez / Sánchez Vicario (ESP); L (1–6, 2–6)	Did not advance	3rd place, bronze medalist(s)

== Water Polo ==
Summary

Key:

- FT – After full time.

Team	Event	Group stage						Classification round		
Team	Event	Opposition Score	Opposition Score	Opposition Score	Opposition Score	Opposition Score	Rank	Opposition Score	Opposition Score	Rank
Australia men's	Men's tournament	United States; L 4–8	France; W 9–5	Unified Team; L 9–12	Germany; D 7–7	Czechoslovakia; W 15–9	3	Cuba; W 7–5	Hungary; W 9–8	5

Team roster

- Simon Asher
- Geoffrey Clark
- John Fox
- Daniel Marsden
- Raymond Mayers
- Greg McFadden
- Guy Newman
- Mark Oberman
- Paul Oberman
- Troy Stockwell
- Glenn Townsend
- Andrew Wightman
- Chris Wybrow

Group play

Pos	Team	Pld	W	D	L	GF	GA	GD	Pts
1	Unified Team	5	5	0	0	50	32	+18	10
2	United States	5	4	0	1	40	24	+16	8
3	Australia	5	2	1	2	44	41	+3	5
4	Germany	5	1	2	2	38	41	−3	4
5	France	5	1	1	3	38	42	−4	3
6	Czechoslovakia	5	0	0	5	33	63	−30	0

1 August 1992; 10:45	United States	8–4	Australia	Piscinas Bernat Picornell; Referees: Eugeni Acensio (ESP), Fred van Dorp (NED)
1 August 1992; 10:45	Score by quarters: 1–1, 2–1, 3–1, 2–1			Piscinas Bernat Picornell; Referees: Eugeni Acensio (ESP), Fred van Dorp (NED)
1 August 1992; 10:45	Kimbell, Klass 2	Goals	Clark 3	Piscinas Bernat Picornell; Referees: Eugeni Acensio (ESP), Fred van Dorp (NED)

2 August 1992; 12:00	Australia	9–5	France	Piscinas Bernat Picornell; Referees: Fred van Dorp (NED), Manuel de Jesús (PUR)
2 August 1992; 12:00	Score by quarters: 2–1, 2–0, 2–2, 3–2			Piscinas Bernat Picornell; Referees: Fred van Dorp (NED), Manuel de Jesús (PUR)
2 August 1992; 12:00	Mayers, Clark 2	Goals	Jeleff 2	Piscinas Bernat Picornell; Referees: Fred van Dorp (NED), Manuel de Jesús (PUR)

3 August 1992; 19:45	Unified Team	12–9	Australia	Piscina Municipal de Montjuïc; Referees: Eugeni Asencio (ESP), Fred van Dorp (NED)
3 August 1992; 19:45	Score by quarters: 3–2, 4–3, 1–2, 4–2			Piscina Municipal de Montjuïc; Referees: Eugeni Asencio (ESP), Fred van Dorp (NED)
3 August 1992; 19:45	Apanasenko 5	Goals	three players 2	Piscina Municipal de Montjuïc; Referees: Eugeni Asencio (ESP), Fred van Dorp (NED)

5 August 1992; 17:30	Germany	7–7	Australia	Piscina Municipal de Montjuïc; Referees: Antal Vuszek (HUN), Manuel de Jesús (PUR)
5 August 1992; 17:30	Score by quarters: 1–2, 3–2, 1–0, 2–3			Piscina Municipal de Montjuïc; Referees: Antal Vuszek (HUN), Manuel de Jesús (PUR)
5 August 1992; 17:30	Dresel, Reimann 2	Goals	Clark, Wybrow 2	Piscina Municipal de Montjuïc; Referees: Antal Vuszek (HUN), Manuel de Jesús (PUR)

6 August 1992; 9:30	Australia	15–9	Czechoslovakia	Piscina Municipal de Montjuïc; Referees: Eugeni Asencio (ESP), Lionel Liew (SGP)
6 August 1992; 9:30	Score by quarters: 5–2, 2–2, 3–1, 5–4			Piscina Municipal de Montjuïc; Referees: Eugeni Asencio (ESP), Lionel Liew (SGP)
6 August 1992; 9:30	Wybrow 5	Goals	Horňák 3	Piscina Municipal de Montjuïc; Referees: Eugeni Asencio (ESP), Lionel Liew (SGP)

Classification round 5th-8th place

Pos	Team	Pld	W	D	L	GF	GA	GD	Pts
5	Australia	3	2	1	0	23	20	+3	5
6	Hungary	3	2	0	1	28	27	+1	4
7	Germany	3	1	1	1	24	21	+3	3
8	Cuba	3	0	0	3	22	29	−7	0

Source: https://www.olympedia.org/results/38777

8 August 1992; 12:00	Australia	7–5	Cuba	Piscinas Bernat Picornell; Referees: Eduard Prelovský (TCH), Masaru Masaoka (JPN)
8 August 1992; 12:00	Score by quarters: 2–0, 3–1, 2–2, 0–2			Piscinas Bernat Picornell; Referees: Eduard Prelovský (TCH), Masaru Masaoka (JPN)
8 August 1992; 12:00	Marsden 3	Goals	Pérez 2	Piscinas Bernat Picornell; Referees: Eduard Prelovský (TCH), Masaru Masaoka (JPN)

9 August 1992; 14:00	Australia	9–8	Hungary	Piscinas Bernat Picornell; Referees: Manuel de Jesús (PUR), Miroslav Radenović (YUG)
9 August 1992; 14:00	Score by quarters: 2–2, 3–4, 3–2, 1–0			Piscinas Bernat Picornell; Referees: Manuel de Jesús (PUR), Miroslav Radenović (YUG)
9 August 1992; 14:00	Clark 4	Goals	Benedek 4	Piscinas Bernat Picornell; Referees: Manuel de Jesús (PUR), Miroslav Radenović (YUG)

== Weightlifting ==
Athlete	Event	Snatch		Clean & jerk		Total	Rank
Athlete	Event	Result	Rank	Result	Rank	Total	Rank
Damian Brown	75 kg	140.0	20	177.5	17	317.5	22
Ron Laycock	75 kg	142.5	17	185.0	8	327.5	13
Harvey Goodman	90 kg	157.5	8	192.5	8	350.0	8
Steve Kettner	+110 kg	170.0	7	205.0	12	375.0	11

== Wrestling ==
Freestyle

Athlete	Event	Group Stage						Final	
Athlete	Event	Opposition Result	Opposition Result	Opposition Result	Opposition Result	Opposition Result	Rank	Opposition Result	Rank
Musa Ilhan	62 kg	Žukovs (LAT); L fall	Cáceres (ESP); W 11–4	Nieves (PUR); W fall	Müller (SUI); W 4–3	Mohammadian (IRI); L 0–6	3	Azizov (EUN); L 5–11	6
Cris Brown	68 kg	Santoro (FRA); L 3–4	Akbarnejad (IRI); L 0–4	Did not advance					

== See also ==
- Australia at the 1990 Commonwealth Games
- Australia at the 1994 Commonwealth Games
