= Table tennis at the 1988 Summer Olympics – Women's doubles =

Table tennis at the Olympics

Table tennis – Women's doubles at the Games of the XXIV Olympiad
- Venue: Seoul National University Gymnasium
- Date: 23 to 30 September 1988
- Competitors: 30 from 15 nations

Medalists
1st place, gold medalist(s)		Hyun Jung-hwa; Yang Young-ja	South Korea
2nd place, silver medalist(s)		Chen Jing; Jiao Zhimin	China
3rd place, bronze medalist(s)		Jasna Fazlić; Gordana Perkučin	Yugoslavia

These are the results of the women's doubles competition, one of two events for female competitors in table tennis at the 1988 Summer Olympics in Seoul.

== Group stage ==
=== Group A ===
Rank	Athlete	W	L	GW	GL	PW	PL	KOR	URS	YUG	HUN	TPE	HKG	NGR	AUS
1	Yang Young-Ja and Hyun Jung-Hwa (KOR)	7	0	14	1	313	169	X	2–0	2–0	2–0	2–1	2–0	2–0	2–0
2	Fliura Bulatova and Elena Kovtoun (URS)	5	2	10	6	295	262	0–2	X	2–0	2–1	0–2	2–1	2–0	2–0
3	Jasna Fazlić and Gordana Perkučin (YUG)	5	2	10	4	267	229	0–2	0–2	X	2–0	2–0	2–0	2–0	2–0
4	Csilla Bátorfi and Edit Urban (HUN)	4	3	9	8	301	312	0–2	1–2	0–2	X	2–1	2–0	2–0	2–1
5	Chang Hsiu-yu and Lin Li-ju (TPE)	4	3	10	7	319	290	1–2	2–0	0–2	1–2	X	2–1	2–0	2–0
6	Mok Ka Sha and Hui So Hung (HKG)	1	6	5	12	262	333	0–2	1–2	0–2	0–2	1–2	X	2–0	1–2
7	Kuburat Owolabi and Lyabo Akanmu (NGR)	1	6	2	12	206	288	0–2	0–2	0–2	0–2	0–2	0–2	X	2–0
8	Kerri Tepper and Nadia Bisiach (AUS)	1	6	3	13	248	328	0–2	0–2	0–2	1–2	0–2	2–1	0–2	X

=== Group B ===
Rank	Athlete	W	L	GW	GL	PW	PL	CHN	TCH	NED	JPN	FRG	USA	MAS
1	Jiao Zhimin and Chen Jing (CHN)	6	0	12	1	266	147	X	2–0	2–0	2–0	2–0	2–1	2–0
2	Marie Hrachová and Renata Kasalova (TCH)	5	1	10	3	254	232	0–2	X	2–0	2–0	2–0	2–1	2–0
3	Bettine Vriesekoop and Mirjam Kloppenburg (NED)	4	2	8	6	259	247	0–2	0–2	X	2–1	2–1	2–0	2–0
4	Mika Hoshino and Kiyomi Ishida (JPN)	3	3	7	7	258	261	0–2	0–2	1–2	X	2–1	2–0	2–0
5	Olga Nemes and Katja Nolten (FRG)	2	4	6	9	282	290	0–2	0–2	1–2	1–2	X	2–1	2–0
6	In Sook Bhushan and Diana Gee (USA)	1	5	5	10	241	276	1–2	1–2	0–2	0–2	1–2	X	2–0
7	Lau Wai Cheng and Leong Mee Wan (MAS)	0	6	0	12	147	254	0–2	0–2	0–2	0–2	0–2	0–2	X

== Knockout stage ==
Quarterfinals
A1	Yang Young-Ja (KOR); Hyun Jung-Hwa (KOR)	21	21
B3	Bettine Vriesekoop (NED); Mirjam Hooman (NED)	15	12
B4	Mika Hoshino (JPN); Kiyomi Ishida (JPN)	21	21
A2	Fliura Abbate-Bulatova (URS); Elena Kovtun (URS)	18	11
B2	Marie Hrachová (TCH); Renata Kasalova (TCH)	19	17
A3	Jasna Fazlić (YUG); Gordana Perkučin (YUG)	21	21
A4	Csilla Bátorfi (HUN); Edit Urban (HUN)	10	14
B1	Jiao Zhimin (CHN); Chen Jing (CHN)	21	21

Semifinals
A1	Yang Young-Ja (KOR); Hyun Jung-Hwa (KOR)	21	21
B4	Mika Hoshino (JPN); Kiyomi Ishida (JPN)	19	9
A3	Jasna Fazlić (YUG); Gordana Perkučin (YUG)	19	21	18
B1	Jiao Zhimin (CHN); Chen Jing (CHN)	21	14	21

Gold medal match
A1	Yang Young-Ja (KOR); Hyun Jung-Hwa (KOR)	21	16	21
B1	Jiao Zhimin (CHN); Chen Jing (CHN)	19	21	10
Bronze medal match
B4	Mika Hoshino (JPN); Kiyomi Ishida (JPN)	14	21	16
A3	Jasna Fazlić (YUG); Gordana Perkučin (YUG)	21	11	21
