= Table tennis at the 1988 Summer Olympics – Women's singles =

Table tennis at the Olympics

Table tennis – Women's singles at the Games of the XXIV Olympiad
- Venue: Seoul National University Gymnasium
- Date: 23 September to 1 October 1988
- Competitors: 48 from 28 nations

Medalists
| 1st place, gold medalist(s) | | Chen Jing | China |
| 2nd place, silver medalist(s) | | Li Huifen | China |
| 3rd place, bronze medalist(s) | | Jiao Zhimin | China |

These are the results of the women's singles competition, one of two events for female competitors in table tennis at the 1988 Summer Olympics in Seoul.

== Group stage ==
=== Group A ===
| Rank | Athlete | W | L | GW | GL | PW | PL | CHN | HUN | URS | CAN | USA | DOM |
|---|---|---|---|---|---|---|---|---|---|---|---|---|---|
| 1 | Jiao Zhimin (CHN) | 5 | 0 | 15 | 4 | 386 | 248 | X | 3–1 | 3–2 | 3–1 | 3–0 | 3–0 |
| 2 | Edit Urbán (HUN) | 4 | 1 | 13 | 3 | 301 | 247 | 1–3 | X | 3–0 | 3–0 | 3–0 | 3–0 |
| 3 | Olena Kovtun (URS) | 3 | 2 | 11 | 6 | 303 | 288 | 2–3 | 0–3 | X | 3–0 | 3–0 | 3–0 |
| 4 | Mariann Domonkos (CAN) | 2 | 3 | 7 | 11 | 318 | 334 | 1–3 | 0–3 | 0–3 | X | 3–2 | 3–0 |
| 5 | Diana Gee (USA) | 1 | 4 | 5 | 12 | 292 | 315 | 0–3 | 0–3 | 0–3 | 2–3 | X | 3–0 |
| 6 | Blanca Alejo (DOM) | 0 | 5 | 0 | 15 | 147 | 315 | 0–3 | 0–3 | 0–3 | 0–3 | 0–3 | X |

=== Group B ===
| Rank | Athlete | W | L | GW | GL | PW | PL | KOR | TCH | TPE | HKG | VEN | JOR |
|---|---|---|---|---|---|---|---|---|---|---|---|---|---|
| 1 | Yang Young-Ja (KOR) | 5 | 0 | 15 | 0 | 316 | 168 | X | 3–0 | 3–0 | 3–0 | 3–0 | 3–0 |
| 2 | Renata Kasalová (TCH) | 4 | 1 | 12 | 5 | 325 | 262 | 0–3 | X | 3–0 | 3–2 | 3–0 | 3–0 |
| 3 | Lin Li-ju (TPE) | 3 | 2 | 9 | 7 | 270 | 247 | 0–3 | 0–3 | X | 3–1 | 3–0 | 3–0 |
| 4 | Hui So Hung (HKG) | 2 | 3 | 9 | 9 | 309 | 288 | 0–3 | 2–3 | 1–3 | X | 3–0 | 3–0 |
| 5 | Elizabeth Popper (VEN) | 1 | 4 | 3 | 12 | 213 | 272 | 0–3 | 0–3 | 0–3 | 0–3 | X | 3–0 |
| 6 | Jaklein Al-Duqom (JOR) | 0 | 5 | 0 | 15 | 119 | 315 | 0–3 | 0–3 | 0–3 | 0–3 | 0–3 | X |

=== Group C ===
| Rank | Athlete | W | L | GW | GL | PW | PL | CHN | URS | JPN | USA | AUS | TUN |
|---|---|---|---|---|---|---|---|---|---|---|---|---|---|
| 1 | Chen Jing (CHN) | 5 | 0 | 15 | 0 | 315 | 177 | X | 3–0 | 3–0 | 3–0 | 3–0 | 3–0 |
| 2 | Valentina Popova (URS) | 4 | 1 | 12 | 3 | 300 | 207 | 0–3 | X | 3–0 | 3–0 | 3–0 | 3–0 |
| 3 | Kyoko Uchiyama (JPN) | 3 | 2 | 9 | 8 | 296 | 241 | 0–3 | 0–3 | X | 3–2 | 3–0 | 3–0 |
| 4 | Insook Bhushan (USA) | 2 | 3 | 8 | 9 | 279 | 269 | 0–3 | 0–3 | 2–3 | X | 3–0 | 3–0 |
| 5 | Nadia Bisiach (AUS) | 1 | 4 | 3 | 12 | 184 | 282 | 0–3 | 0–3 | 0–3 | 0–3 | X | 3–0 |
| 6 | Feiza Ben Aïssa (TUN) | 0 | 5 | 0 | 15 | 117 | 315 | 0–3 | 0–3 | 0–3 | 0–3 | 0–3 | X |

=== Group D ===
| Rank | Athlete | W | L | GW | GL | PW | PL | CHN | HKG | JPN | AUS | MAS | GHA |
|---|---|---|---|---|---|---|---|---|---|---|---|---|---|
| 1 | Li Huifen (CHN) | 5 | 0 | 15 | 0 | 315 | 151 | X | 3–0 | 3–0 | 3–0 | 3–0 | 3–0 |
| 2 | Mok Ka Sha (HKG) | 4 | 1 | 12 | 3 | 292 | 184 | 0–3 | X | 3–0 | 3–0 | 3–0 | 3–0 |
| 3 | Kiyomi Ishida (JPN) | 3 | 2 | 9 | 7 | 275 | 279 | 0–3 | 0–3 | X | 3–1 | 3–0 | 3–0 |
| 4 | Kerri Tepper (AUS) | 2 | 3 | 7 | 10 | 282 | 313 | 0–3 | 0–3 | 1–3 | X | 3–0 | 3–1 |
| 5 | Lau Wai Cheng (MAS) | 1 | 4 | 3 | 13 | 191 | 323 | 0–3 | 0–3 | 0–3 | 3–0 | X | 3–1 |
| 6 | Patricia Offel (GHA) | 0 | 5 | 2 | 15 | 249 | 354 | 0–3 | 0–3 | 0–3 | 1–3 | 1–3 | X |

=== Group E ===
| Rank | Athlete | W | L | GW | GL | PW | PL | KOR | JPN | YUG | FRG | NGR | PER |
|---|---|---|---|---|---|---|---|---|---|---|---|---|---|
| 1 | Hyun Jung-Hwa (KOR) | 5 | 0 | 15 | 2 | 346 | 232 | X | 3–0 | 3–1 | 3–0 | 3–0 | 3–1 |
| 2 | Mika Hoshino (JPN) | 4 | 1 | 12 | 6 | 352 | 299 | 0–3 | X | 3–0 | 3–2 | 3–1 | 3–0 |
| 3 | Jasna Fazlić-Reed (YUG) | 3 | 2 | 10 | 8 | 321 | 318 | 1–3 | 0–3 | X | 3–2 | 3–0 | 3–0 |
| 4 | Katja Nolten (FRG) | 2 | 3 | 10 | 13 | 411 | 415 | 0–3 | 2–3 | 2–3 | X | 3–2 | 3–2 |
| 5 | Kuburat Owolabi (NGR) | 1 | 4 | 6 | 14 | 333 | 394 | 0–3 | 1–3 | 0–3 | 2–3 | X | 3–2 |
| 6 | Mónica Liyau (PER) | 0 | 5 | 5 | 15 | 293 | 398 | 1–3 | 0–3 | 0–3 | 2–3 | 2–3 | X |

=== Group F ===
| Rank | Athlete | W | L | GW | GL | PW | PL | URS | TCH | TPE | BEL | MAS | IND |
|---|---|---|---|---|---|---|---|---|---|---|---|---|---|
| 1 | Fliura Abbate-Bulatova (URS) | 5 | 0 | 15 | 3 | 364 | 244 | X | 3–2 | 3–1 | 3–0 | 3–0 | 3–0 |
| 2 | Marie Hrachová (TCH) | 4 | 1 | 14 | 5 | 380 | 280 | 2–3 | X | 3–1 | 3–1 | 3–0 | 3–0 |
| 3 | Chang Hsiu-yu (TPE) | 3 | 2 | 11 | 6 | 310 | 276 | 1–3 | 1–3 | X | 3–0 | 3–0 | 3–0 |
| 4 | Karina Bogaerts (BEL) | 2 | 3 | 7 | 9 | 239 | 280 | 0–3 | 1–3 | 0–3 | X | 3–0 | 3–0 |
| 5 | Leong Mee Wan (MAS) | 1 | 4 | 3 | 12 | 196 | 305 | 0–3 | 0–3 | 0–3 | 0–3 | X | 3–0 |
| 6 | Niyati Roy-Shah (IND) | 0 | 5 | 0 | 15 | 211 | 315 | 0–3 | 0–3 | 0–3 | 0–3 | 0–3 | X |

=== Group G ===
| Rank | Athlete | W | L | GW | GL | PW | PL | NED | BUL | TCH | YUG | ARG | EGY |
|---|---|---|---|---|---|---|---|---|---|---|---|---|---|
| 1 | Bettine Vriesekoop (NED) | 5 | 0 | 15 | 1 | 335 | 197 | X | 3–1 | 3–0 | 3–0 | 3–0 | 3–0 |
| 2 | Daniela Guergueltcheva (BUL) | 4 | 1 | 13 | 5 | 357 | 268 | 1–3 | X | 3–0 | 3–2 | 3–0 | 3–0 |
| 3 | Alena Šafářová (TCH) | 3 | 2 | 9 | 6 | 268 | 225 | 0–3 | 0–3 | X | 3–0 | 3–0 | 3–0 |
| 4 | Gordana Perkučin (YUG) | 2 | 3 | 8 | 9 | 282 | 296 | 0–3 | 2–3 | 0–3 | X | 3–0 | 3–0 |
| 5 | Hae-Ja Kim de Rimasa (ARG) | 1 | 4 | 3 | 13 | 214 | 319 | 0–3 | 0–3 | 0–3 | 0–3 | X | 3–1 |
| 6 | Nihal Meshref (EGY) | 0 | 5 | 1 | 15 | 182 | 333 | 0–3 | 0–3 | 0–3 | 0–3 | 1–3 | X |

=== Group H ===
| Rank | Athlete | W | L | GW | GL | PW | PL | KOR | FRG | NED | HUN | CHI | NGR |
|---|---|---|---|---|---|---|---|---|---|---|---|---|---|
| 1 | Hong Cha-Ok (KOR) | 4 | 1 | 13 | 6 | 368 | 308 | X | 3–1 | 3–2 | 1–3 | 3–0 | 3–0 |
| 2 | Olga Nemes (FRG) | 4 | 1 | 13 | 5 | 362 | 307 | 1–3 | X | 3–0 | 3–2 | 3–0 | 3–0 |
| 3 | Mirjam Hooman-Kloppenburg (NED) | 3 | 2 | 11 | 9 | 388 | 350 | 2–3 | 0–3 | X | 3–2 | 3–0 | 3–1 |
| 4 | Csilla Bátorfi (HUN) | 3 | 2 | 13 | 7 | 398 | 340 | 3–1 | 2–3 | 2–3 | X | 3–0 | 3–0 |
| 5 | Jacqueline Díaz (CHI) | 1 | 4 | 3 | 13 | 225 | 319 | 0–3 | 0–3 | 0–3 | 0–3 | X | 3–1 |
| 6 | Iyabo Akanmu (NGR) | 0 | 5 | 2 | 15 | 232 | 349 | 0–3 | 0–3 | 1–3 | 0–3 | 1–3 | X |

== Knockout stage ==
First round
A1 | Jiao Zhimin (CHN) | 15 | 21 | 21 | 17 | 21
E2 | Mika Hoshino (JPN) | 21 | 12 | 8 | 21 | 11
B2 | Renata Kasalova (TCH) | 14 | 6 | 13
H1 | Hong Cha-ok (KOR) | 21 | 21 | 21
E1 | Hyun Jung-hwa (KOR) | 14 | 13 | 23
C2 | Valentina Popova (URS) | 21 | 21 | 25
H2 | Olga Nemes (FRG) | 21 | 18 | 15 | 10
D1 | Li Huifen (CHN) | 15 | 21 | 21 | 21
C1 | Chen Jing (CHN) | 21 | 21 | 22
G2 | Daniela Guergueltcheva (BUL) | 15 | 7 | 20
D2 | Mok Ka Sha (HKG) | 21 | 14 | 24 | 15 | 10
F1 | Fliura Abbate-Bulatova (URS) | 17 | 21 | 22 | 21 | 21
G1 | Bettine Vriesekoop (NED) | 21 | 19 | 21 | 18 | 21
A2 | Edit Urban (HUN) | 7 | 21 | 15 | 21 | 18
F2 | Marie Hrachová (TCH) | 21 | 11 | 23 | 21
B1 | Yang Young-ja (KOR) | 18 | 21 | 21 | 18

Quarterfinals
A1 | Jiao Zhimin (CHN) | 21 | 21 | 21
H1 | Hong Cha-ok (KOR) | 9 | 9 | 11
C2 | Valentina Popova (URS) | 13 | 12 | 19
D1 | Li Huifen (CHN) | 21 | 21 | 21
C1 | Chen Jing (CHN) | 21 | 21 | 21
F1 | Fliura Abbate-Bulatova (URS) | 4 | 11 | 2
G1 | Bettine Vriesekoop (NED) | 8 | 15 | 19
F2 | Marie Hrachová (TCH) | 21 | 21 | 21

Semifinals
A1 | Jiao Zhimin (CHN) | 16 | 17 | 11
D1 | Li Huifen (CHN) | 21 | 21 | 21
C1 | Chen Jing (CHN) | 21 | 21 | 21
F2 | Marie Hrachová (TCH) | 15 | 12 | 12

Gold medal match
D1 | Li Huifen (CHN) | 17 | 16 | 23 | 21 | 15
C1 | Chen Jing (CHN) | 21 | 21 | 21 | 15 | 21
Bronze medal match
A1 | Jiao Zhimin (CHN) | 21 | 21 | 21
F2 | Marie Hrachová (TCH) | 18 | 19 | 17
