= Malaysia at the 1988 Summer Olympics =

- IOC code: MAS (MAL used at these Games)
- NOC: Olympic Council of Malaysia

in Seoul
- Competitors: 9 (5 men, 4 women) in 5 sports
- Flag bearer: Nordin Mohamed Jadi
- Medals: Gold 0 Silver 0 Bronze 0 Total 0

Summer Olympics appearances (overview)
- 1956; 1960; 1964; 1968; 1972; 1976; 1980; 1984; 1988; 1992; 1996; 2000; 2004; 2008; 2012; 2016; 2020; 2024

Other related appearances
- North Borneo (1956)

Malaysia competed at the 1988 Summer Olympics in Seoul, South Korea. Nine competitors, five men and four women, took part in fifteen events in five sports.

== Competitors ==
The following is the list of number of competitors in the Games.

Sport	Men	Women	Total
Athletics	1	1	2
Cycling	2	0	2
Shooting	1	0	1
Swimming	1	1	2
Table tennis	0	2	2
Total	5	4	9

== Athletics ==
Men
Track event

Athlete	Events	Heat		Quarterfinal		Semifinal		Final	
Athlete	Events	Time	Rank	Time	Rank	Time	Rank	Time	Rank
Nordin Mohamed Jadi	400 m	49.52	6	did not advance					

Women
Track event

Athlete	Events	Heat		Quarterfinal		Semifinal		Final	
Athlete	Events	Time	Rank	Time	Rank	Time	Rank	Time	Rank
Josephine Mary Singarayar	400 m	56.06	6	did not advance					

== Cycling ==
Two male cyclists represented Malaysia in 1988.

=== Road ===
Athlete	Event	Time	Rank
Murugayan Kumaresan	Men's individual road race	4:35:45 (+3:23)	92

=== Track ===
Sprint

Athlete	Event	Qualification		Round 1	Repechage 1	Round 2	Repechage 2	Quarterfinals	Semifinals	Final	
Athlete	Event	Time	Rank	Opposition Time	Opposition Time	Opposition Time	Opposition Time	Opposition Time	Opposition Time	Opposition Time	Rank
Rosman Alwi	Men's sprint	11.204	16 Q	L Heßlich (GDR); Eom Y-s (KOR); L	C Harnett (CAN); K Carpenter (USA); V Lynch (BAR); L	did not advance					

Time trial

Athlete	Event	Points	Rank
Rosman Alwi	Men's 1000 m time trial	1:10.446	25

Points race

Athlete	Event	Qualification		Final	
Athlete	Event	Points	Rank	Points	Rank
Murugayan Kumaresan	Men's points race	1	13	did not advance	

== Shooting ==
Mixed

Athlete	Event	Qualification		Semifinal		Final	
Athlete	Event	Score	Rank	Score	Rank	Score	Rank
Jimmy Chin	Skeet	136	52	did not advance			

== Swimming ==
Men

Athlete	Events	Round 1		Final B		Final A	
Athlete	Events	Time	Rank	Time	Rank	Time	Rank
Jeffrey Ong	200 m freestyle	1:58.62	53	did not advance			
Jeffrey Ong	400 m freestyle	4:04.57	36	did not advance			
Jeffrey Ong	1500 m freestyle	15:53.67	29	—N/a		did not advance	

Women

Athlete	Events	Round 1		Final B		Final A	
Athlete	Events	Time	Rank	Time	Rank	Time	Rank
Nurul Huda Abdullah	200 m freestyle	2:04.85	27	did not advance			
Nurul Huda Abdullah	400 m freestyle	4:19.33	23	did not advance			
Nurul Huda Abdullah	800 m freestyle	8:50.84	19	—N/a		did not advance	

== Table tennis ==
Athlete	Event	Preliminary round	Round of 16	Quarterfinal	Semifinal	Final	
Athlete	Event	Opposition Score	Opposition Score	Opposition Score	Opposition Score	Opposition Score	Rank
Lau Wai Cheng	Women's singles	Li (CHN); L 0–3 Mok (HKG); L 0–3; Ishida (JPN); L 0–3; Tepper (AUS); W 3–0; Patricia Offei (GHA); W 3–1; 5th in group	did not advance				
Leong Mee Wan	Women's singles	Boulatova (URS); L 0–3 Hrachova (TCH); L 0–3; Chang (TPE); L 0–3; Bogaerts (BEL); L 0–3; Roy (IND); W 3–0; 5th in group	did not advance				
Lau Wai Cheng; Leong Mee Wan	Women's doubles	China; L 0–2 Japan; L 0–2; Czechoslovakia; L 0–2; West Germany; L 0–2; Netherlands; L 0–2; United States; L 0–2; 7th in group	—N/a	did not advance			

== See also ==
- Malaysia at the 1986 Asian Games
