= Athletics at the 1988 Summer Olympics – Women's 400 metres =

Women's 400 metres at the Games of the XXIV Olympiad
- Venue: Olympic Stadium
- Dates: 23 September 1988 (heats); 24 September 1988 (quarter-finals); 25 September 1988 (semi-finals); 26 September 1988 (final)
- Competitors: 46 from 33 nations
- Winning time: 48.65 OR

Medalists
1st place, gold medalist(s)		Olga Bryzgina; Soviet Union
2nd place, silver medalist(s)		Petra Müller; East Germany
3rd place, bronze medalist(s)		Olga Nazarova; Soviet Union

The women's 400 metres event at the 1988 Summer Olympics in Seoul, South Korea had an entry list of 48 competitors. The final was run on Monday September 26, 1988, in the Seoul Olympic Stadium.

== Records ==
These were the standing world and Olympic records (in seconds) prior to the 1988 Summer Olympics.

World record	47.60	(East Germany) Marita Koch	Canberra (AUS)	October 6, 1985
Olympic record	48.83	(United States) Valerie Brisco-Hooks	Los Angeles (USA)	August 6, 1984

The following Olympic record was set during this competition.

Date	Event	Athlete	Time	OR	WR
September 26, 1988	Final	Olga Bryzgina (URS)	48.65s	OR	

== Final ==
Rank	Athlete	Nation	Time	Notes
1st place, gold medalist(s)	Olga Bryzgina	Soviet Union	48.65(OR)	
2nd place, silver medalist(s)	Petra Müller	East Germany	49.45	
3rd place, bronze medalist(s)	Olga Nazarova	Soviet Union	49.90	
4	Valerie Brisco-Hooks	United States	50.16	
5	Diane Dixon	United States	50.72	
6	Denean Howard	United States	51.12	
7	Helga Arendt	West Germany	51.17	
8	Maree Holland	Australia	51.25	

== Semifinals ==
Rank	Athlete	Nation	Time	Notes
1	Olga Nazarova	Soviet Union	49.11	
2	Petra Müller	East Germany	49.50	
3	Diane Dixon	United States	49.84	
4	Denean Howard	United States	49.87	
5	Jillian Richardson	Canada	49.91	
6	Ute Thimm	West Germany	50.28	
7	Marita Payne Wiggins	Canada	50.29	
8	Dagmar Neubauer	East Germany	50.92	

Rank	Athlete	Nation	Time	Notes
1	Olga Bryzgina	Soviet Union	49.33	
2	Valerie Brisco-Hooks	United States	49.90	
3	Maree Holland	Australia	50.24	
4	Helga Arendt	West Germany	50.36	
5	Kirsten Emmelmann	East Germany	50.39	
6	Cathy Rattray-Williams	Jamaica	50.82	
7	Charmaine Crooks	Canada	51.63	
8	Norfalia Carabalí	Colombia	52.65	

== Quarter-finals ==
Rank	Athlete	Nation	Time	Notes
1	Maree Holland	Australia	50.90	
2	Kirsten Emmelmann	East Germany	51.02	
3	Denean Howard	United States	51.02	
4	Ute Thimm	West Germany	51.18	
5	Maria Magnólia Figueiredo	Brazil	51.32	
6	Airat Bakare	Nigeria	52.86	
7	Loreen Hall	Great Britain	53.42	
—	Nathalie Simon	France	DNS	

Rank	Athlete	Nation	Time	Notes
1	Olga Bryzgina	Soviet Union	51.90	
2	Diane Dixon	United States	51.98	
3	Helga Arendt	West Germany	52.08	
4	Jillian Richardson	Canada	52.33	
5	Sandie Richards	Jamaica	52.90	
6	Évelyne Élien	France	53.36	
7	Sun Sumei	China	53.58	
8	Yolande Straughn	Barbados	54.22	

Rank	Athlete	Nation	Time	Notes
1	Petra Müller	East Germany	51.45	
2	Marita Payne Wiggins	Canada	51.73	
3	Norfalia Carabalí	Colombia	51.76	
4	Cathy Rattray-Williams	Jamaica	51.81	
5	Linda Keough	Great Britain	51.91	
6	Yvonne van Dorp	Netherlands	53.50	
7	Liliana Chalá	Ecuador	53.83	
8	Mercy Kuttan-Mathews	India	53.93	

Rank	Athlete	Nation	Time	Notes
1	Olga Nazarova	Soviet Union	50.26	
2	Valerie Brisco-Hooks	United States	51.24	
3	Dagmar Neubauer	East Germany	51.48	
4	Charmaine Crooks	Canada	51.64	
5	Céléstine N'Drin	Ivory Coast	52.04	
6	Aïssatou Tandian	Senegal	52.33	
7	Fabienne Ficher	France	52.95	
8	Blanca Lacambra	Spain	53.76	

== Qualifying heats ==
Rank	Athlete	Nation	Time	Notes
1	Olga Nazarova	Soviet Union	52.18	
2	Blanca Lacambra	Spain	53.04	
3	Charmaine Crooks	Canada	53.58	
4	Liliana Chalá	Ecuador	53.74	
5	Pat Beckford	Great Britain	54.39	
6	Yang Gyeong-hui	South Korea	58.18	
7	Juliana Obiong	Equatorial Guinea	1:07.58	

Rank	Athlete	Nation	Time	Notes
1	Dagmar Neubauer	East Germany	52.51	
2	Marita Payne Wiggins	Canada	52.70	
3	Airat Bakare	Nigeria	52.83	
4	Fabienne Ficher	France	53.42	
5	Farida Kyakutewa	Uganda	56.00	
6	Christine Bakombo	Zaire	57.85	

Rank	Athlete	Nation	Time	Notes
1	Maria Magnólia Figueiredo	Brazil	51.74	
2	Petra Müller	East Germany	51.93	
3	Sandie Richards	Jamaica	52.19	
4	Loreen Hall	Great Britain	53.13	
5	Sun Sumei	China	53.46	
6	Yolande Straughn	Barbados	53.62	

Rank	Athlete	Nation	Time	Notes
1	Diane Dixon	United States	52.45	
2	Ute Thimm	West Germany	52.79	
3	Yvonne van Dorp	Netherlands	52.84	
4	Évelyne Élien	France	52.90	
5	Marilyn Dewarder	Guyana	54.76	
6	May Sardouk	Lebanon	1:00.01	

Rank	Athlete	Nation	Time	Notes
1	Valerie Brisco-Hooks	United States	51.96	
2	Maree Holland	Australia	52.29	
3	Norfalia Carabalí	Colombia	53.27	
4	Kirsten Emmelmann	East Germany	54.02	
5	Assumpta Achuo-Bei	Cameroon	55.22	
6	Josephine Mary Singarayar	Malaysia	56.06	
7	Lasnet Nkouka	Republic of the Congo	57.19	

Rank	Athlete	Nation	Time	Notes
1	Olga Bryzgina	Soviet Union	51.94	
2	Linda Keough	Great Britain	52.26	
3	Cathy Rattray-Williams	Jamaica	52.39	
4	Céléstine N'Drin	Ivory Coast	52.48	
5	Mercy Kuttan-Mathews	India	53.41	
6	Ruth Morris	Virgin Islands	55.60	
7	Barbara Selkridge	Antigua and Barbuda	55.96	

Rank	Athlete	Nation	Time	Notes
1	Denean Howard	United States	52.26	
2	Helga Arendt	West Germany	52.69	
3	Aïssatou Tandian	Senegal	52.95	
4	Jillian Richardson	Canada	53.06	
5	Nathalie Simon	France	53.30	
6	Chang Feng-hua	Chinese Taipei	56.10	
7	Agnes Griffith	Grenada	57.09	

== See also ==
- 1987 Women's World Championships 400 metres (Rome)
- 1990 Women's European Championships 400 metres (Split)
- 1991 Women's World Championships 400 metres (Tokyo)
- 1992 Women's Olympic 400 metres (Barcelona)
