= May Sardouk =

Lebanese sprinter (born 1963)

Personal information
- Native name: مي وفيق سردوك
- Full name: May Wafic Sardouk
- National team: Lebanon
- Born: June 4, 1963 (age 63)

Sport
- Country: Lebanon
- Sport: Athletics
- Updated on 22 July 2017

May Wafic Sardouk (Arabic: مي وفيق سردوك; born June 4, 1963) is a Lebanese Olympic athlete. She represented Lebanon in 1988 Summer Olympics in Seoul, and came in last in her heat in round one.

== Olympic participation ==
Sardouk and Nancy Khalaf were the only female participants for Lebanon in that tournament among a total of 21 participant for Lebanon.

Athletics – Women's 400 metres – Round One

Heat 4
Rank	Athlete	Time
1.	Diane Dixon (USA)	52.45
2.	Ute Thimm (FRG)	52.79
3.	Yvonne van Dorp (NED)	52.84
4.	Évelyne Élien (FRA)	52.90
5.	Marilyn Dewarder (GUY)	54.76
6.	May Sardouk (LIB)	1:00.01
