= Colin Hamilton =

Colin Hamilton may refer to:

- Colin Hamilton (curler), Scottish curler
- Colin Hamilton (footballer) (born 1992), Scottish footballer
- Colin Hamilton (pentathlete) (born 1966), Australian modern pentathlete
