= Australian Christian College – Moreton =

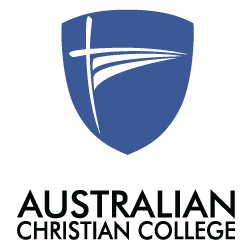

Location
- 34 Cottrill Road, Caboolture, Queensland; Australia; 27°03′29″S 152°57′11″E

Information
- Type: Independent co-educational early learning, primary and secondary day school and distance education centre
- Motto: Growing in Christ
- Denomination: Non-denominational Christian
- Established: 2009; 17 years ago
- Founder: Christian Education Ministries Ltd
- Principal: Darren Lawson
- Years: Early learning; and K to Year 12
- Enrolment: c. 1,850 (February 2022)
- Colours: Navy blue and white
- Affiliations: Australian Christian Colleges; Association of Independent Schools of Queensland
- Website: www.acc.edu.au/moreton

The Australian Christian College – Moreton is an independent non-denominational Christian co-educational early learning, primary and secondary day school and distance education centre, located in Caboolture, Queensland, Australia. The school caters for children ranging from early learning to year 12. As of 2013, year-12 students can complete their Queensland Certificate of Education at the school.

Australian Christian College – Moreton is one of nine Australian Christian College schools located in Australia.

== Vision ==
The school is owned and operated by Christian Education Ministries Ltd and is a member of the Association of Independent Schools of Queensland.

The principal is Darren Lawson. The school has grown to approximately 1,850 students. It has a large distance education student cohort. Most students that attend the school reside in Caboolture, Morayfield, Bellmere, Burpengary, Ningi, Bribie Island and surrounds. In addition, the school offers distance education to students who reside across Queensland and beyond.

== Enrolment ==
Enrolment is open to Christian students of all denominations as well as non-Christian students.

During the 2011 year, the school opened a new multi-purpose centre and administration building funded by the Australian Government's Building the Education Revolution scheme. In 2017, the school opened a double storey primary school building comprising 11 classrooms and a toilet block.

== See also ==
- List of schools in Queensland
