= Athletics at the 1992 Summer Olympics – Women's 400 metres =

Women's 400 metres at the Games of the XXV Olympiad
- Venue: Estadi Olímpic de Montjuïc
- Dates: 1 August 1992 (heats); 2 August 1992 (quarter-finals); 3 August 1992 (semi-finals); 5 August 1992 (final)
- Competitors: 41 from 29 nations
- Winning time: 48.83

Medalists
1st place, gold medalist(s)		Marie-José Pérec; France
2nd place, silver medalist(s)		Olha Bryzhina; Unified Team
3rd place, bronze medalist(s)		Ximena Restrepo; Colombia

These are the official results of the women's 400 metres event at the 1992 Summer Olympics in Barcelona, Spain. There were a total number of 41 participating athletes, with six qualifying heats. The finals were held on July 25. The winning margin was 0.22 seconds.

== Records ==
These were the standing world and Olympic records (in seconds) prior to the 1992 Summer Olympics.

World record	47.60	(East Germany) Marita Koch	Canberra (AUS)	October 6, 1985
Olympic record	48.65	(Soviet Union) Olga Bryzgina	Seoul (KOR)	September 26, 1988

== Final ==
Rank	Athlete	Nation	Time	Notes
1st place, gold medalist(s)	Marie-José Pérec	France	48.83	
2nd place, silver medalist(s)	Olga Bryzgina	Unified Team	49.05	
3rd place, bronze medalist(s)	Ximena Restrepo	Colombia	49.64	AR
4	Olga Nazarova	Unified Team	49.69	
5	Jillian Richardson	Canada	49.93	
6	Rochelle Stevens	United States	50.11	
7	Sandie Richards	Jamaica	50.19	
8	Phylis Smith	Great Britain	50.87	

== Semifinals ==
Rank	Athlete	Nation	Time	Notes
1	Marie-José Pérec	France	49.48	
2	Ximena Restrepo	Colombia	49.76	
3	Olga Bryzgina	Unified Team	49.76	
4	Phylis Smith	Great Britain	50.40	
5	Jearl Miles	United States	50.57	
6	Natasha Kaiser	United States	50.60	
7	Michelle Lock	Australia	50.78	
8	Yelena Ruzina	Unified Team	51.30	

Rank	Athlete	Nation	Time	Notes
1	Jillian Richardson	Canada	50.02	
2	Olga Nazarova	Unified Team	50.31	
3	Sandie Richards	Jamaica	50.35	
4	Rochelle Stevens	United States	50.37	
5	Norfalia Carabalí	Colombia	51.75	
6	Sandra Douglas	Great Britain	51.96	
7	Renée Poetschka	Australia	52.09	
8	Elsa Devassoigne	France	52.85	

== Quarterfinals ==
Rank	Athlete	Nation	Time	Notes
1	Ximena Restrepo	Colombia	50.63	
2	Olga Bryzgina	Unified Team	50.68	
3	Natasha Kaiser	United States	50.71	
4	Sandra Douglas	Great Britain	51.41	
5	Cathy Freeman	Australia	51.52	
6	Aïssatou Tandian	Senegal	52.39	
7	Jayamini Illeperuma	Sri Lanka	53.55	
8	Judit Forgács	Hungary	54.24	

Rank	Athlete	Nation	Time	Notes
1	Jillian Richardson	Canada	50.95	
2	Jearl Miles	United States	51.27	
3	Olga Nazarova	Unified Team	51.30	
4	Michelle Lock	Australia	51.71	
5	Anja Rücker	Germany	52.05	
6	Juliet Campbell	Jamaica	52.12	
7	Tina Paulino	Mozambique	52.34	
8	Ruth Morris	Virgin Islands	54.92	

Rank	Athlete	Nation	Time	Notes
1	Phylis Smith	Great Britain	51.32	
2	Elsa Devassoigne	France	51.75	
3	Renée Poetschka	Australia	52.05	
4	Yelena Ruzina	Unified Team	52.23	
5	Julia Merino	Spain	52.43	
6	Claudine Williams	Jamaica	52.84	
7	Susie Tanéfo	Cameroon	53.78	
8	Noodang Phimpho	Thailand	54.90	

Rank	Athlete	Nation	Time	Notes
1	Rochelle Stevens	United States	50.70	
2	Sandie Richards	Jamaica	50.76	
3	Marie-José Pérec	France	50.89	
4	Norfalia Carabalí	Colombia	51.65	
5	Myra Mayberry	Puerto Rico	53.37	
6	Lorraine Hanson	Great Britain	53.60	
7	Zoila Stewart	Costa Rica	53.60	
8	Alimata Koné	Ivory Coast	53.80	

== Heats ==
Rank	Athlete	Nation	Time	Notes
1	Natasha Kaiser	United States	51.41	
2	Ximena Restrepo	Colombia	52.34	
3	Julia Merino	Spain	52.90	
4	Juliet Campbell	Jamaica	53.69	
5	Ruth Morris	Virgin Islands	54.37	
6	Prisca Philip	Barbados	55.09	
7	Fanta Dao	Mali	1:01.97	

Rank	Athlete	Nation	Time	Notes
1	Sandie Richards	Jamaica	52.56	
2	Jearl Miles	United States	52.79	
3	Sandra Douglas	Great Britain	52.91	
4	Jayamini Illeperuma	Sri Lanka	54.14	
5	Charmaine Gilgeous	Antigua and Barbuda	55.48	
6	Shermaine Ross	Grenada	55.49	

Rank	Athlete	Nation	Time	Notes
1	Elsa Devassoigne	France	52.07	
2	Olga Bryzgina	Unified Team	52.44	
3	Michelle Lock	Australia	52.49	
4	Lorraine Hanson	Great Britain	52.66	
5	Tina Paulino	Mozambique	52.93	
6	Zoila Stewart	Costa Rica	53.72	
7	Mary-Estelle Kapalu	Vanuatu	55.75	

Rank	Athlete	Nation	Time	Notes
1	Jillian Richardson	Canada	51.99	
2	Olga Nazarova	Unified Team	52.09	
3	Norfalia Carabalí	Colombia	52.18	
4	Anja Rücker	Germany	52.24	
5	Aïssatou Tandian	Senegal	52.29	
6	Susie Tanéfo	Cameroon	53.37	
7	Jacqueline Solíz	Bolivia	56.78	

Rank	Athlete	Nation	Time	Notes
1	Phylis Smith	Great Britain	53.59	
2	Marie-José Pérec	France	53.64	
3	Cathy Freeman	Australia	53.70	
4	Myra Mayberry	Puerto Rico	53.75	
5	Judit Forgács	Hungary	54.87	
6	Ngozi Mwanamwambwa	Zambia	54.88	
7	Melrose Mansaray	Sierra Leone	55.67	

Rank	Athlete	Nation	Time	Notes
1	Rochelle Stevens	United States	52.42	
2	Renée Poetschka	Australia	52.85	
3	Yelena Ruzina	Unified Team	52.94	
4	Claudine Williams	Jamaica	52.97	
5	Alimata Koné	Ivory Coast	53.76	
6	Noodang Pimpol	Thailand	54.28	
7	Ruth Mangue	Equatorial Guinea	1:03.32	

== See also ==
- 1987 Women's World Championships 400 metres (Rome)
- 1988 Women's Olympic 400 metres (Seoul)
- 1990 Women's European Championships 400 metres (Split)
- 1991 Women's World Championships 400 metres (Tokyo)
- 1993 Women's World Championships 400 metres (Stuttgart)
- 1994 Women's European Championships 400 metres (Helsinki)
