= Australian Christian College – Benalla =

Australian Christian College – Hume
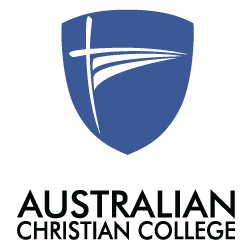

Location
- 57 Samaria Road, Benalla, Victoria; Australia; 36°33′14″S 145°59′46″E

Information
- Type: private, co-educational, early learning, primary and secondary day school
- Motto: Growing in Christ
- Denomination: Non-denominational Christian
- Established: 2012; 14 years ago
- Principal: Sam Woods
- Years: Prep to Year 10
- Enrolment: 100 (January 2023)
- Colours: Navy blue and white
- Affiliations: Australian Christian Colleges
- Website: www.acc.edu.au/hume/

Australian Christian College – Hume is a private non-denominational Christian co-educational primary and secondary, located in Benalla, Victoria, Australia. The school caters for students ranging from Prep to Year 10.

The Australian Christian College – Hume is one of 12 Australian Christian Colleges located in Australia.

== Overview ==
The principal is Sam Woods. In 2023, the School has moved to the site previously occupied by GO TAFE to accommodate the growth in student numbers.

Enrolment is open to Christian students of all denominations as well as non-Christian students.

== See also ==
- List of schools in Victoria, Australia
