= Alena Šafářová =

Czech table tennis player

Personal information
- Nationality: Czech
- Born: 17 April 1968 (age 57) Žďár nad Sázavou, Czechoslovakia

Sport
- Sport: Table tennis

Alena Šafářová (born 17 April 1968) is a Czech table tennis player. She competed in the women's singles event at the 1988 Summer Olympics.
