= Fanta Dao =

Malian sprinter (born 1973)

Personal information
- Nationality: Malian
- Born: 7 March 1973 (age 53)

Sport
- Sport: Sprinting
- Event: 400 metres

Fanta Dao (born 7 March 1973) is a Malian sprinter. She competed in the women's 400 metres at the 1992 Summer Olympics.
