= Jacqueline Díaz =

Chilean table tennis player

Personal information
- Born: 15 June 1964 (age 60); Rancagua, Chile

Sport
- Sport: Table tennis

Jacqueline Díaz (born 15 June 1964) is a Chilean table tennis player. She competed in the women's singles event at the 1988 Summer Olympics.
