= Loreen Hall =

English sprinter

Personal information
- Nationality: British (English)
- Born: 12 October 1967 (age 58) Nottingham, England
- Height: 170 cm (5 ft 7 in)
- Weight: 63 kg (139 lb)

Sport
- Sport: Athletics
- Event: Sprinting/400m
- Club: Notts AC

Loreen Doloris Hall (born 12 October 1967) is an English former sprinter. She won a bronze medal in the 4 × 400 metres relay at the 1985 European Junior Championships, and went on to represent Great Britain in the women's 400 metres at the 1988 Seoul Olympics.

== Biography ==
Born in Nottingham, Hall ran 53.08 secs for 400 metres as a 16-year-old at a Junior international in July 1984. She won an English Schools 200 m title in 1984, and a AAA Junior Indoor Championships 400 m title in 1985, before winning a bronze medal in the 4 × 400 metres relay at the 1985 European Junior Championships in Cottbus with teammates Georgina Honley, Lynne Robinson and Dawn Flockhart. In other junior internationals, she took a sprint sweep from 100 m to 400 m in Australia, won a 100 m in Cyprus and won a 200 m/400 m double at the Cosford Indoor Games.

Hall ran 53.69 secs to finish second behind Linda Keough at the 1987 WAAA Championships. She was the UK's number one 400 metres runner in 1987, with a season's best of 52.74. She achieved her 400 m best of 52.71 on 18 June 1988 at the Midland Championships in Birmingham. This performance ranked her third in the UK in 1988, and she earned Olympic selection. At the Seoul Olympics, she ran 53.13 in the heats, to reach the quarter-finals, where she ran 53.42.

== International competitions ==
Year	Competition	Venue	Position	Event	Notes
Representing Great Britain
1985	European Junior Championships	Cottbus, Germany	3rd	4 × 400 m	3:35.10
1988	Olympic Games	Seoul, South Korea	QF	400 m	53.42
