= Nadia Bisiach =

Australian table tennis player

Personal information
- Born: 25 January 1965 (age 61) Murtoa, Victoria, Australia
- Height: 1.63 m (5 ft 4 in)

Sport
- Country: Australia
- Sport: Table tennis

Nadia Bisiach (born 25 January 1965), is an Australian former table tennis player who competed at the 1988 Seoul Olympics, the first Olympics to include table tennis.

Bisiach was a member of the Victorian team that won at the 1981 Australian Open Table Tennis Championships. Playing with Wendy Hughes, she won the Australian doubles at the 1987 Australian Open Table Tennis Championships held in Brisbane.

She competed in both the women's singles and doubles table tennis events, teaming up with Kerri Tepper in the latter. She finished equal 33rd of 48 in the singles event, while she and Tepper came 15th (last) in the doubles competition.

Bisiach was inducted into the open division of the Hall of Fame of Table Tennis Victoria in 2010.
