= Australian Christian College – Singleton =

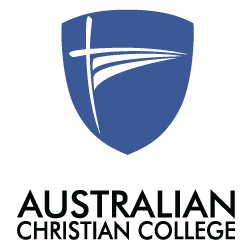

Location
- 23 Maitland Road, Singleton, New South Wales; Australia; 33°40′40″S 150°50′19″E

Information
- Type: Independent co-educational early learning, primary and secondary day school and distance education centre
- Motto: Growing in Christ
- Denomination: Non-denominational Christian
- Established: 1988; 38 years ago
- Founder: Christian Education Ministries Ltd
- Principal: Tim Shields
- Years: Early learning and Kindergarten to Year 10
- Enrolment: 110 (approx.) (April 2017)
- Colours: Navy blue and white
- Affiliations: Australian Christian Colleges; Christian Schools Australia; Association of Independent Schools of NSW
- Website: www.acc.edu.au/singleton

Australian Christian College – Singleton is an independent non-denominational Christian co-educational early learning, primary and secondary day school, located in Singleton in the Hunter Valley of New South Wales, Australia. The school caters for children ranging from early learning to Year 10.

Australian Christian College – Singleton is one of nine Australian Christian Colleges located in Australia.

== Overview ==
The school is owned and operated by Christian Education Ministries Ltd and is a member of Christian Schools Australia and the Association of Independent Schools of New South Wales.

In 2013, the school transitioned from Singleton Christian College to Australian Christian College – Singleton. It has approximately 110 students. Most students who attend the school reside in Singleton and a smaller number travel from nearby towns such as Branxton, Greta, Muswellbrook and Denman. Enrolment is open to Christian students of all denominations as well as non-Christian students.

In 2010, the Singleton Trade Training Centre was built on the school campus. This initiative is a partnership between Singleton High School (which offers Construction and Hospitality), St Catherine's Catholic College (which offers Primary Industries), Singleton TAFE (which offers Automotive), and Australian Christian College – Singleton (which offers Electrotechnology).

== See also ==
- List of non-government schools in New South Wales
