= Patricia Offel =

Ghanaian table tennis player

Personal information
- Nationality: Ghanaian
- Born: 19 December 1971 (age 53)

Sport
- Sport: Table tennis

Patricia Offel (born 19 December 1971) is a Ghanaian table tennis player. She competed in the women's singles event at the 1988 Summer Olympics.
