= Chan Kong Wah =

Hong Kong table tennis player

Chan Kong Wah (born 31 August 1961 in Guangdong) is a Hong Kong table tennis player who played at the 1996 Summer Olympics.

He is married to former teammate Mok Ka Sha, who like him went to Hong Kong in the 1980s.
