= Australian Christian College – Southlands =

School in Albany, Western Australia

Coordinates: 34.99°S 117.92°E

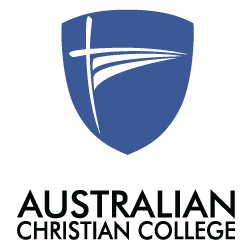

Location
- 26 Brewster Road, Albany WA 6330, Australia

Information
- Type: Independent, co-educational, on-campus & online
- Motto: Growing in Christ
- Denomination: Christian
- Established: 2006
- Principal: David Ramsay
- Grades: Kindergarten to Year 12
- Enrolment: 570 (approximate) (June 2020)
- Colours: Navy blue and white
- Affiliations: Australian Christian Colleges
- Website: acc.edu.au/southlands

Australian Christian College – Southlands is a co-educational school, located in Albany, Western Australia. The school has grades ranging from Kindergarten to Year 12. As of 2013, Year 12 students will be able to complete their WACE at the school.

== Associations ==
The school is owned and operated by Christian Education Ministries Ltd and is a member of the Association of Independent Schools of Western Australia.

== Principal ==
Malcolm Bromhead assumed the role in late 2014, having previously worked as principal of a fast-growing Christian school in New South Wales. The school has grown to approximately 570 students. In 2012, the school campus was upgraded with classrooms renovated and extensive landscaping occurring.

== Student locations ==
Most students that attend the school reside in Albany, Mt Barker, Denmark, Youngs, Manypeaks and surrounds. In addition, the school offers distance education to students who reside across Western Australia.

== Christianity ==
Enrolment is open to Christian students of all denominations as well as non-Christian students.

Australian Christian College – Southlands is one of nine Australian Christian Colleges located in Australia.
