= Noodang Phimpho =

Thai sprinter

Personal information
- Nationality: Thai
- Born: 15 October 1968 Maha Sarakham Province, Thailand
- Died: 11 January 2011 (aged 42) Bangkok, Thailand

Sport
- Sport: Sprinting
- Event: 400 metres
Medal record
Women's athletics
Representing Thailand
Asian Championships
Bronze medal – third place	1991 Kuala Lumpur	4×400 m
Bronze medal – third place	1995 Jakarta	4×400 m

Noodang Phimpho (Thai: หนูแดง พิมพ์โพธิ์, RTGS: Nudaeng Phimpho; 15 October 1968 – 11 January 2011) is a Thai sprinter. She competed in the women's 400 metres at the 1992 Summer Olympics.
