= Sandra Douglas =

English athlete

Personal information
- Nationality: British (English)
- Born: 22 April 1967 (age 59) Cheetham Hill, Manchester, England
- Height: 162 cm (5 ft 4 in)
- Weight: 55 kg (121 lb)

Sport
- Sport: Athletics
- Event: 400m
- Club: Trafford AC
Medal record
Representing Great Britain
Women's Athletics
Olympic Games
Bronze medal – third place	1992 Barcelona	4 x 400 metres

Sandra Marie Douglas (born 22 April 1967) is a female English former athlete who competed mainly in the 400 metres. She won a bronze medal in the 4 × 400 metres relay at the 1992 Summer Olympics.

== Biography ==
Douglas was born in Cheetham Hill, Manchester. She competed for Great Britain at the 1992 Olympics Games held in Barcelona, where she ran her lifetime best of 51.41 secs to reach the semifinals of the 400 metres, before going on to win a bronze medal in the 4 x 400 metres relay, with her teammates Phyllis Smith, Jennifer Stoute and Sally Gunnell. Douglas also competed for England at the 1994 Commonwealth Games.

== International competitions ==
Year	Competition	Venue	Position	Event	Notes
Representing Great Britain
1992	Olympic Games	Barcelona. Spain	14th (sf)	400 m	51.96 (51.41)
1992	Olympic Games	Barcelona. Spain	3rd	4 × 400 m	3:24.23
Representing England
1994	Commonwealth Games	Victoria, Canada	23rd (h)	400 m	55.54
(#) Indicates overall position in qualifying heats (h) or semifinals (sf)

=== National titles ===
- UK Championships 400 metres (1992)
- AAA Indoor Championships 400 metres (1991)
