= Australian Christian College =

The Australian Christian College system is a group of sixteen non-denominational Christian schools in Australia. The ACC schools are:

- Australian Christian College – Moreton, Queensland
- Australian Christian College – Singleton, New South Wales
- Australian Christian College – Port Macquarie, New South Wales
- Australian Christian College – Brightwaters, New South Wales
- Australian Christian College – Marsden Park, New South Wales
- Australian Christian College – Medowie, New South Wales
- Australian Christian College – Swan Hill, Victoria
- Australian Christian College – Echuca, Victoria
- Australian Christian College – Benalla, Victoria
- Australian Christian College – Bairnsdale, Victoria
- Australian Christian College – Casey, Victoria
- Australian Christian College – Darling Downs, Western Australia
- Australian Christian College – Southlands, Western Australia
- Australian Christian College – Burnie, Tasmania
- Australian Christian College – Hobart, Tasmania
- Australian Christian College – Launceston, Tasmania

The schools are operated by Christian Education Ministries. CEM was founded in 2003, and the first school (Southlands) was established in 2006. Marsden Park and Moreton joined in 2007 and the schools were renamed Australian Christian College in 2009.

The ACC offers distance education and are Australia's largest non-government provider.

== Podcast ==
The Australian Christian College records their own podcast called "The Inspiration Project". The podcast interviews and explorers the lives of well-known Christians. The podcast is hosted by the Principal of ACC, Mr Brendan Corr, and supported by ACC alumnus, ACC Graduate, Jarred Fantom, who organises guests and edits the podcast episodes.
