= Australian Christian College – Marsden Park =

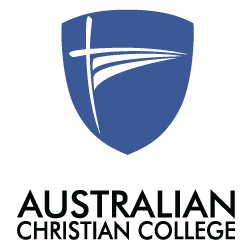

Location
- 69 Farm Road, Marsden Park, Sydney, New South Wales; Australia; 33°40′40″S 150°50′19″E

Information
- Type: Independent co-educational primary and secondary day school
- Motto: Growing in Christ
- Denomination: Non-denominational Christian
- Established: 2007; 19 years ago
- Founder: Christian Education Ministries Ltd
- Status: Open
- Educational authority: NSW Department of Education
- Principal: Brendan Corr
- Years: Kindergarten to Year 12
- Enrolment: 1400 (On-Campus) 900 (Distance Education) (December 2024)
- Colours: Navy blue and white
- Affiliations: Australian Christian Colleges; Christian Schools Australia; Association of Independent Schools of New South Wales
- Website: www.acc.edu.au/marsdenpark

Australian Christian College – Marsden Park is an independent, non-denominational Christian, co-educational primary and secondary day school located in the north-western Sydney suburb of Marsden Park, New South Wales, Australia. It offers education for students from Kindergarten through to Year 12, with Year 12 students able to complete the Higher School Certificate at the school.

Australian Christian College – Marsden Park is part of the Australian Christian Colleges network, which comprises twelve schools across Australia. The school is owned and operated by Christian Education Ministries Ltd, and is affiliated with Christian Schools Australia and the Association of Independent Schools of New South Wales.

Established in 2007 with the assistance of founding principal Paulle Kwok, the school has grown to an enrolment of approximately 830 students as of June 2020, including both on-campus and distance education students. The school celebrated its first Year 12 graduating class in 2011.

== See also ==
- List of non-government schools in New South Wales
