= Mark Oberman =

Australian water polo player

Personal information
- Born: September 24, 1967 (age 58) Perth, Western Australia, Australia

Sport
- Sport: Water polo
Medal record
Representing Australia
Summer Universiade
Bronze medal – third place	1995 Fukuoka	Team competition

Mark Raymond Oberman (born 24 September 1967) is an Australian water polo player who competed in the 1992 Summer Olympics and in the 2000 Summer Olympics. His younger brother Paul Oberman is also an international water polo player.
