= Australian Christian College – Darling Downs =

Coordinates: 32.175°S 116.005°E

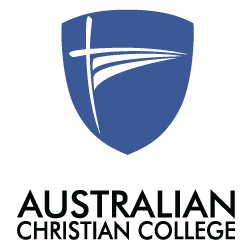

Location
- 10 Ninth Road, Brookdale WA 6112, Australia

Information
- Type: Independent, co-educational
- Motto: Growing in Christ
- Denomination: Christian
- Established: 2012
- Principal: Jade Baker
- Grades: Kindergarten to Year 10
- Enrolment: 51 (March 2016)
- Colours: Navy blue and white
- Affiliations: Australian Christian Colleges
- Website: www.acc.edu.au/darlingdowns

Australian Christian College – Darling Downs is a Christian co-educational school, located in Brookdale, a suburb of Perth, Western Australia. The school has grades ranging from Kindergarten to Year 10.

The school is owned and operated by Christian Education Ministries Ltd and is a member of the Association of Independent Schools of Western Australia.

The former principal, Jacqui Burrage, previously worked in leadership positions at a number of Christian schools in Western Australia. Most students who attend the school reside in the southeast corridor of Perth, with a school bus service available.

== Enrolment ==
Enrolment is open to all, but non-Christian students must accept the school's Christian teaching and ethos.

Australian Christian College – Darling Downs is one of six Australian Christian Colleges.
