= Aïssatou Tandian =

Senegalese sprinter

Personal information
- Born: 29 August 1966 (age 59)
- Height: 1.72 m (5 ft 8 in)
- Weight: 68 kg (150 lb)

Sport
- Sport: Track and field
- Event: 400 metres
Medal record
Women's athletics
Representing Senegal
African Championships
Silver medal – second place	1992 Belle Vue Harel	400 m
Bronze medal – third place	1988 Annaba	4×100 m
Bronze medal – third place	1993 Durban	400 m

Aïssatou Tandian-Ndiaye (born 29 August 1966) is a retired Senegalese sprinter who specialised in the 400 metres. She represented her country at the 1988 and 1992 Summer Olympics as well as two World Championships.

Her personal bests are 23.46 seconds in the 200 metres and 51.92 seconds in the 400 metres, both set in 1989.

== Competition record ==
Year	Competition	Venue	Position	Event	Notes
Representing Senegal
1988	African Championships	Annaba, Algeria	3rd	4 × 100 m relay	46.45
1988	Olympic Games	Seoul, South Korea	19th (qf)	400 m	52.33
1989	World Cup	Barcelona, Spain	5th	4 × 400 m relay	3:29.76^{1}
1991	World Championships	Tokyo, Japan	17th (qf)	400 m	53.06
1992	African Championships	Belle Vue Maurel, Mauritius	2nd	400 m	52.64
1992	Olympic Games	Barcelona, Spain	21st (qf)	400 m	52.39
1993	African Championships	Durban, South Africa	3rd	400 m	53.00
1993	World Championships	Stuttgart, Germany	16th (sf)	400 m	52.77

^{1}Africa
