= Michelle Lock =

Australian sprinter

Personal information
- Nationality: Australian
- Born: 29 March 1967 (age 58)

Sport
- Sport: Sprinting
- Event: 400 metres

Michelle Lock (born 29 March 1967) is an Australian sprinter. She competed in the women's 400 metres at the 1992 Summer Olympics.
