= Grant Rice =

Australian cyclist (born 1968)

Personal information
- Born: 14 May 1968 (age 58) Launceston, Tasmania, Australia

Cycling career
- Sport: Cycling

Grant Rex Rice (born 14 May 1968) is an Australian former cyclist. He competed in two events at the 1992 Summer Olympics.
