= Karina Bogaerts =

Belgian table tennis player (born 1966)

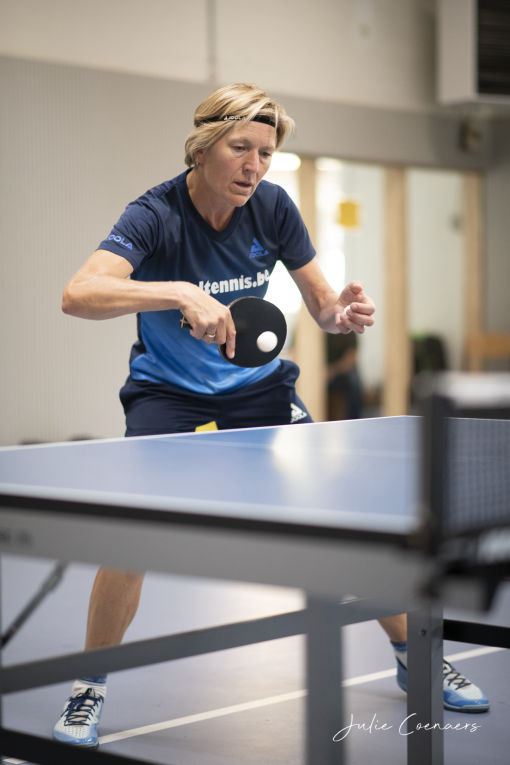

Personal information
- Nationality: Belgian
- Born: 6 August 1966 (age 58); Brussels, Belgium

Sport
- Sport: Table tennis

Karina Bogaerts (Brussels, 6 August 1966) is a Belgian table tennis player.

From 1985 to 1989, she was without interruption the highest ranked table tennis player in Belgium. She crowned herself six times Belgian Table Tennis Champion (1985,1986, 1987,1989, 1990 and 2002). 5 times Belgian Women's Double Champion and 4 times Mixed Double Belgian Champion with Jean-Michel Saive (1985-1987) and Bert De Hertogh (1992).

== Career ==
Started playing table tennis at the age of 7. Made rapid progress and won the girls U11 national criterium 4 years later. Selections for national teams followed one after another. From the national team cadets U14 to juniors U17 to the European and World Championships all categories.

Spring 1988 she qualified for participation in the Olympics in Seoul. Only 16 players from the European continent managed to qualify for this in 1988. So far, she is the first and only female Belgian table tennis player to qualify for the OS. Undoubtedly the sporting highlight.

In 2002, after giving birth to her children in 1995 and 1997, she put an end to her career. Today, she passes on her passion for table tennis by training in various Belgian clubs.

== Highlights ==
- Belgian singles champion 1985, 1986, 1987, 1989, 1990, 2002;
- Belgian champion women's double 1984, 1985 (with Nathalie Higuet), 1992, 1993, 1994, 2000, 2001 (with Cécile Ozer);
- Belgian champion mixed doubles 1985, 1986, 1987 (with Jean-Michel Saive) 1992 (with Bert De Hertogh);
- Winner of national criterium in 1985, 1987, 1989, 1990;
- Golden Palette 1985 - Gold;
- 21st place - highest European ranking in 1988;
- 53rd place - highest World ranking in 1990;
- Qualification and participation Olympic Games Seoul 1988;
- World Championships in 1983, 1985, 1987, 1989, 1991 and 1993;
- European Championships in 1982, 1984, 1986, 1988 and 1990;
- 171 selections for the Belgian national team (record).
