= Katja Nolten =

German table tennis player

Personal information
- Nationality: German
- Born: 26 January 1970 (age 55); Heinsberg, Germany

Sport
- Sport: Table tennis

Katja Nolten (born 16 February 1970) is a German table tennis player. She competed in the women's singles event at the 1988 Summer Olympics.
