= Darren Lawson =

Australian cyclist

Personal information
- Born: 30 March 1968 (age 58)

Cycling career
- Sport: Cycling

Darren Lawson (born 30 March 1968) is an Australian former cyclist. He competed in the team time trial at the 1992 Summer Olympics.

In 2022, Lawson was appointed as the principal of Australian Christian College – Moreton.
