= Chang Hsiu-yu =

Taiwanese table tennis player

Personal information
- Nationality: Taiwanese
- Born: 10 February 1965 (age 61)

Sport
- Sport: Table tennis

Chang Hsiu-yu (born 10 February 1965) is a Taiwanese table tennis player. She competed in the women's singles event at the 1988 Summer Olympics.
