= Yvonne van Dorp =

Dutch sprinter and long jumper (born 1966)

Yvonne van Dorp, 2018
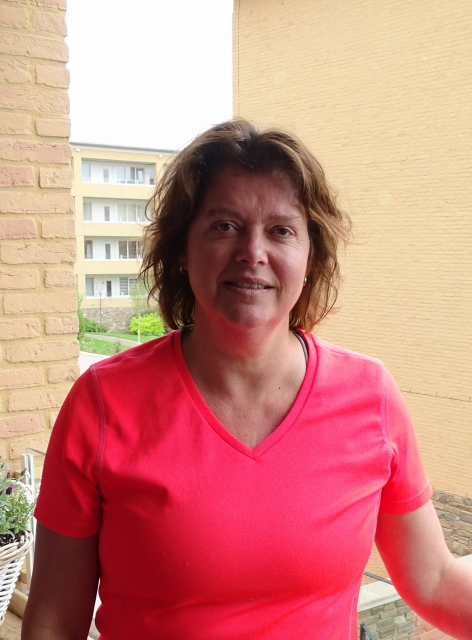

Personal information
- Born: 6 January 1966 (age 60) Leiden, the Netherlands
- Height: 1.75 m (5 ft 9 in)
- Weight: 60 kg (130 lb)

Sport
- Sport: Sprint; Long jump

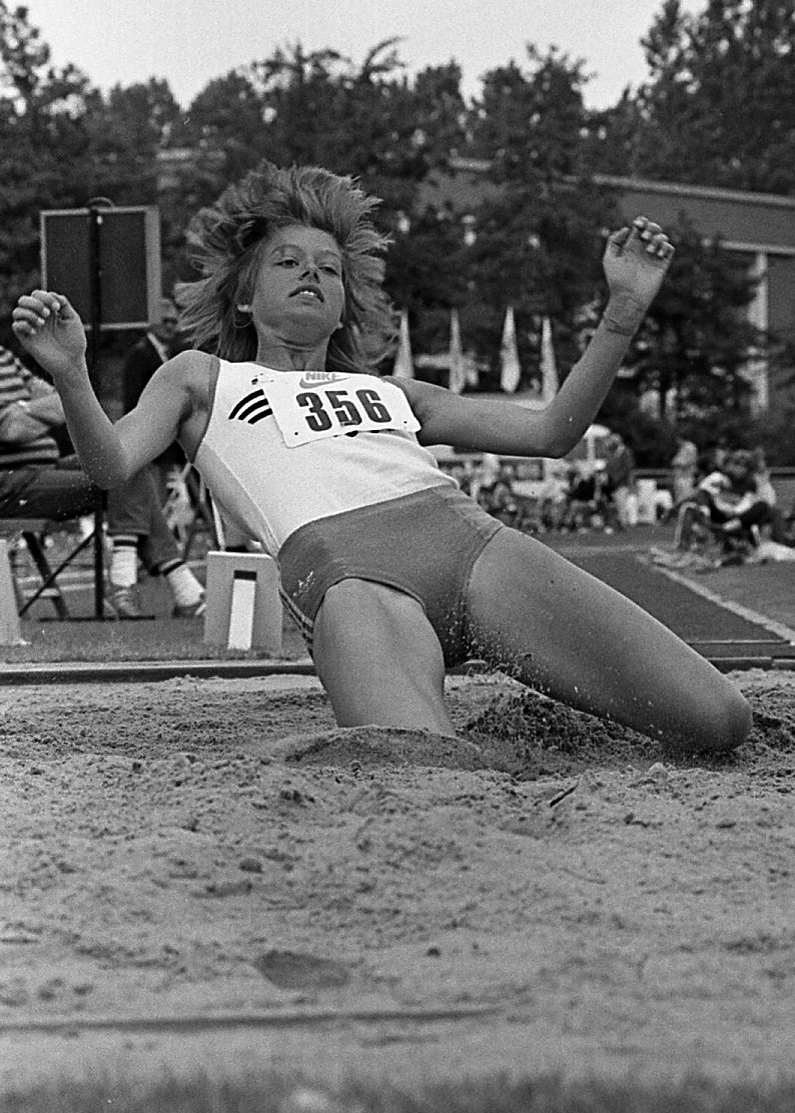
Van Dorp competing in the long jump at the 1984 Netherlands Junior Championship

Yvonne van Dorp (born 6 January 1966) is a retired Dutch sprinter and long jumper. She won several national titles in sprinting and one in the long jump. At the 1988 Summer Olympics, she reached the quarter finals in the women's 400 m. As of 2018 she is the last Dutch woman to have qualified in the 400 m event at the Summer Olympics.

== Career ==
=== Sprinting ===
As a sprinter, van Dorp reached the semifinals of the European Athletics Junior Championships in the 200 m in 1983, and as an adult won multiple Netherlands Championships, both Outdoor and Indoor.

==== Outdoor ====
Distance	Year
200 m	1987
400 m	1987, 1988, 1989

==== Indoor ====
Distance	Year
200 m	1989
400 m	1988, 1989

At the 1988 Summer Olympics in Seoul, she qualified for the quarter final with a personal best time of 52.84 but did not progress. She was not selected for the 1992 Summer Olympics.

=== Long jump ===
In 1993, van Dorp won the national indoor championship in the long jump.
