= Lin Li-ju =

Taiwanese table tennis player

Personal information
- Nationality: Taiwanese
- Born: 4 February 1967 (age 58)

Sport
- Sport: Table tennis

Lin Li-ju (born 4 February 1967) is a Taiwanese table tennis player. She competed in the women's singles event at the 1988 Summer Olympics.
