= Raymond Mayers =

Australian water polo player

Personal information
- Born: January 8, 1960 (age 65)

Sport
- Sport: Water polo

Raymond Mayers (born 8 January 1960) is an Australian water polo player who competed in the 1984 Summer Olympics, in the 1988 Summer Olympics, and in the 1992 Summer Olympics.
