= Renata Kasalová =

Slovak table tennis player

Personal information
- Nationality: Slovak
- Born: 5 March 1969 (age 56); Bánovce nad Bebravou, Czechoslovakia

Sport
- Sport: Table tennis

Renata Kasalová (born 5 March 1969) is a Slovak table tennis player. She competed in the women's singles event at the 1988 Summer Olympics.
