= Ken Wark =

Australian field hockey player

Personal information
- Born: 3 August 1961 (age 64)
Medal record
Men's Field hockey
Representing Australia
Olympic Games
| Silver medal – second place | 1992 Barcelona | Team competition |
| Bronze medal – third place | 1996 Atlanta | Team competition |

Kenneth "Ken" Christopher Wark (born 3 August 1961 in Sydney) is a former field hockey fullback from Australia, who competed in three Summer Olympics for his native country, starting in 1988. After winning the silver medal in 1992 he ended his career with the bronze medal at the 1996 Summer Olympics in Atlanta, Georgia. Ken plays for local Sydney team Glebe District Hockey Club.

Married in 1985 to Kerrie Banfield

He has three children, Kiara, Kaiden and Kameeka.
