= Kerri Tepper =

Australia table tennis player and sport administrator

Personal information
- Born: 4 March 1967 (age 59) Murtoa, Victoria, Australia
- Height: 1.80 m (5 ft 11 in)

Sport
- Country: Australia
- Sport: Table tennis

Kerri Michelle Tepper (born 4 March 1967), is an Australian former table tennis player who competed at two Olympic Games.

She competed in the 1988 Seoul Olympics in both the women's singles and doubles events, teaming up with Nadia Bisiach in the latter. She finished equal 25th of 48 in the singles event, while she and Bisiach came 15th (last) in the doubles.

At the 1992 Barcelona Olympics Tepper came equal 33 of 62 in the women's singles event and in the doubles she and Ying Kwok finished equal 17th of 31.

From 1993 to 1996 Tepper was Chief Executive Officer of Table Tennis Victoria and was a board member of the Victorian Olympic Committee from 1999 to 2013. She was a board member of the Victorian Institute of Sport from 2001 to 2007.

In 2008 she was inducted into the Australian Table Tennis Hall of Fame and in 2018 she was awarded life membership of Table Tennis Australia.
