= Christopher Wybrow =

Australian water polo player

Personal information
- Born: 21 August 1961 (age 63); New South Wales, Australia

Sport
- Sport: Water polo

Christopher "Chris" Wybrow (born 21 August 1961) is an Australian water polo player who competed in the 1984 Summer Olympics, in the 1988 Summer Olympics, and in the 1992 Summer Olympics. In 2011, he was inducted into the Water Polo Australia Hall of Fame.

== See also ==
- Australia men's Olympic water polo team records and statistics
- List of men's Olympic water polo tournament top goalscorers
