= Marilyn Dewarder =

Guyanese sprinter

Personal information
- Nationality: Guyanese
- Born: 2 April 1960 (age 65)

Sport
- Sport: Sprinting
- Event: 400 metres

Marilyn Dewarder (born 2 April 1960) is a Guyanese sprinter. She competed in the women's 400 metres at the 1988 Summer Olympics.
