= Olena Kovtun =

Ukrainian table tennis player

Personal information
- Nationality: Ukrainian
- Born: 20 November 1966 (age 58); Bryansk, Russian SFSR, Soviet Union

Sport
- Sport: Table tennis

Olena Kovtun (born 20 November 1966) is a Ukrainian table tennis player. She competed at the 1988 Summer Olympics and the 2000 Summer Olympics.
