= Paul Oberman =

Australian water polo player

Personal information
- Born: June 28, 1969 (age 57) Perth, Western Australia, Australia

Sport
- Sport: Water polo
Medal record
Representing Australia
Summer Universiade
Bronze medal – third place	1995 Fukuoka	Team competition
Bronze medal – third place	1997 Sicily	Team competition

Paul Oberman (born 28 June 1969) is an Australian former water polo player who competed in the 1992 Summer Olympics.
