= Mok Ka Sha =

Hong Kong table tennis player

Personal information
- Born: 23 October 1962; Guangdong, China

Chinese name
- Chinese: 莫卡莎
- Hanyu Pinyin: Mò Kǎshā
- Jyutping: Mok6 Kaa1saa1

Sport
- Sport: Table tennis

Mok Ka Sha (born 23 October 1962 in Guangdong) is a Hong Kong table tennis player who represented British Hong Kong at the 1988 Summer Olympics.

== Personal life ==
Mok is married to former teammate Chan Kong Wah.
