= Ying Kwok =

Chinese table tennis player

Ying Kwok (born 24 April 1966) is a Chinese-born table tennis player who represented Australia at the 1992 Summer Olympics.
