= Colin Hamilton (pentathlete) =

Australian modern pentathlete

Personal information
- Born: 26 January 1966 (age 60)

Sport
- Sport: Modern pentathlon

Colin Hamilton (born 22 January 1966) is an Australian former modern pentathlete. He competed at the 1992 Summer Olympics.
