= Kiyomi Ishida =

Japanese table tennis player

Personal information
- Nationality: Japanese
- Born: 28 April 1968 (age 57)

Sport
- Sport: Table tennis

Kiyomi Ishida (石田 清美, Ishida Kiyomi; born 28 April 1968) is a Japanese table tennis player. She competed in the women's singles event at the 1988 Summer Olympics.
