= Iyabo Akanmu =

Nigerian table tennis player

Personal information
- Nationality: Nigeria
- Born: 12 August 1968 (age 56)

Sport
- Sport: Table tennis

Iyabo Akanmu (born 12 August 1968) is a Nigerian table tennis player. She competed in the 1988 Summer Olympics.
