= Hui So Hung =

Hong Kong table tennis player (born 1958)

Hui So Hung (Chinese: 許素虹; pinyin: Xǔ Sùhóng; born 2 December 1958) is a Hong Kong table tennis player who was born in Indonesia and grew up in Huizhou, Guangdong, China. She played at the 1988 Summer Olympics.
