= Bettine Vriesekoop =

Dutch table tennis player

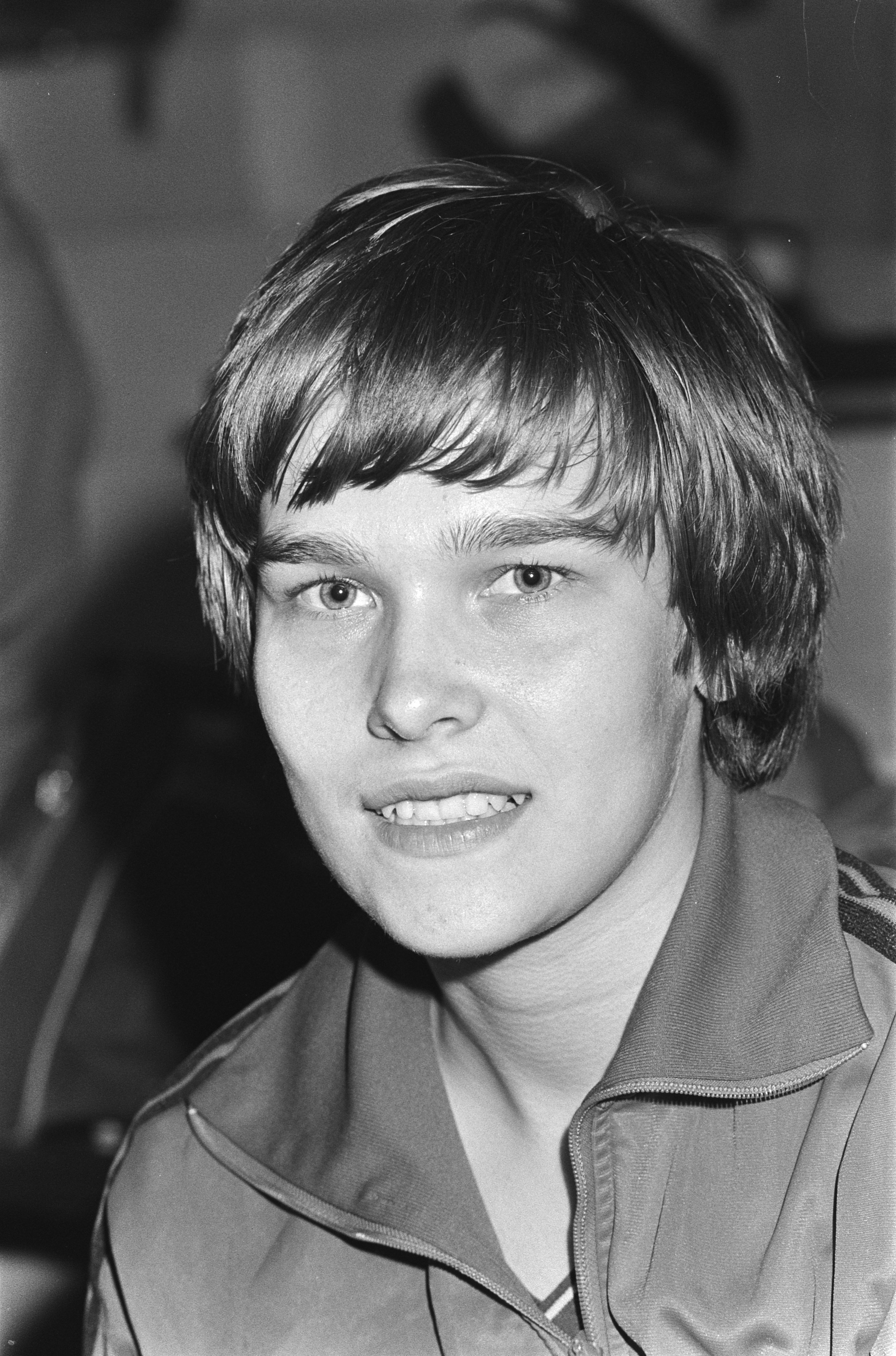
- Bettine Vriesekoop in 1979

Personal information
- Born: 13 August 1961 (age 64) Hazerswoude, the Netherlands
- Height: 1.74 m (5 ft 9 in)
- Weight: 62 kg (137 lb)

Sport
- Sport: Table tennis
Medal record
Representing the Netherlands
European Championships
Gold medal – first place	1982 Budapest	Singles
Gold medal – first place	1982 Budapest	Mixed doubles
Gold medal – first place	1992 Stuttgart	Singles

Hubertina Petronella Maria "Bettine" Vriesekoop (born 13 August 1961) is a former table tennis player from the Netherlands. She was European champion in 1982 and 1992 individually and in 1982 in mixed doubles. She competed at the 1988, 1992 and 1996 Olympics in singles and women doubles with the best achievement of seventh place in both events in 1988.

Vriesekoop started playing table tennis in 1972, and between 1977 and 2002 played at top level in Europe. She won the European Championship twice and was a Dutch Champion fourteen times in the singles and sixteen times in the doubles. Until 1989 she worked with coach Gerard Bakker, and then worked with Jan Vlieg.

== Biography ==
Vriesekoop was the youngest of nine siblings in a farmers family. Her father died of cancer when she was ten years old. In 1995 she appeared on the cover of Playboy Europe, and the issue contained an unprecedented 12-page interview with her. The money she received from Playboy helped her solve financial problems. She retired from competition in 1997, and in 1999 gave birth to a son, but her husband died shortly before that. While training in China she became interested in the culture and then studied Chinese language and philosophy in Leiden. Between 2006 and 2009 she worked in Beijing as a freelance correspondent for several Dutch newspapers including NRC Handelsblad. She was selected as the "Dutch Table Tennis Player of the Century" in 2000 and as the Dutch Sportsman of the year in 1981 and 1985.

== Career highlights ==
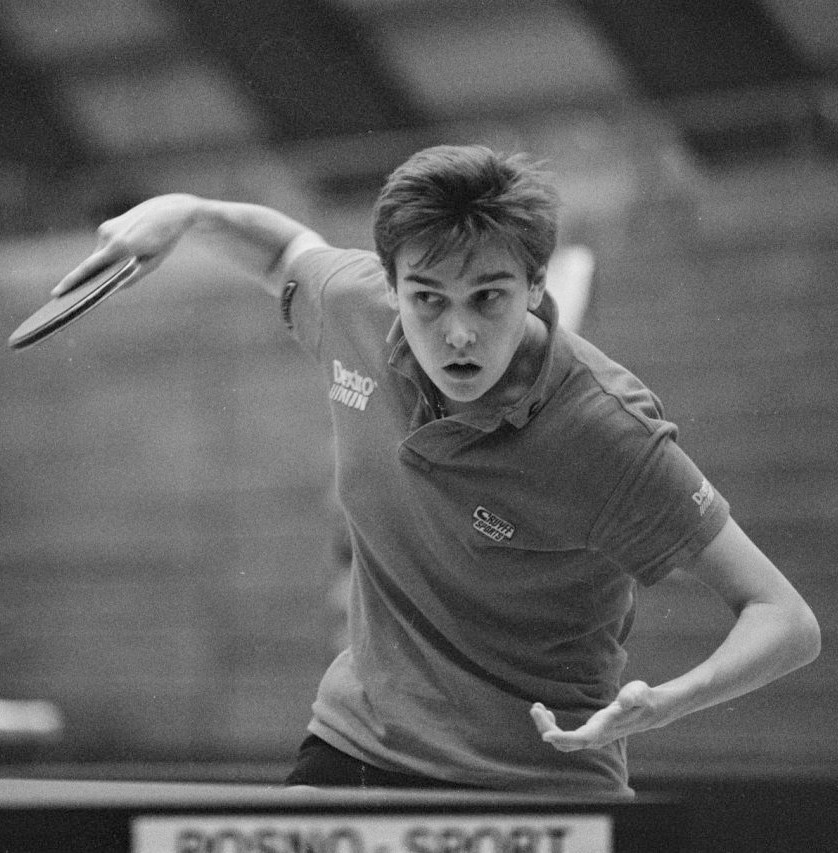
Bettine Vriesekoop in 1986

Summer Olympic Games
1988, Seoul, women's singles, 7th
1988, Seoul, women's doubles, 7th
1992, Barcelona, women's singles, last 16
1992, Barcelona, women's doubles, quarter final
1996, Atlanta, women's singles, 1st round
1996, Atlanta, women's doubles, 1st round
World Championships
1979, Pyongyang, women's singles, last 16
1979, Pyongyang, women's doubles, last 16
1979, Pyongyang, mixed doubles, last 16
1981, Novi Sad, women's singles, last 16
1983, Tokyo, women's singles, last 16
1983, Tokyo, women's doubles, last 16
1983, Tokyo, mixed doubles, quarter final
1983, Tokyo, team competition, 8th
1985, Gothenburg, women's singles, last 16
1985, Gothenburg, women's doubles, last 16
1985, Gothenburg, team competition, 4th
1987, New Delhi, team competition, 4th
1995, Tianjin, women's doubles, last 16
World Doubles Cup:
1992, Las Vegas, women's singles, quarter final
World Team Cup:
1994, Nîmes, 3rd (bronze)
Pro Tour Grand Finals
1996, Tianjin, women's singles, last 16
Pro Tour Meetings
1996, Kettering, women's singles, quarter final
1996, Kitaku-Shu, women's singles, quarter final
1996, Kitaku-Shu, women's doubles, quarter final
1998, Beirut, women's doubles, quarter final
European Championships
1980, Bern, women's singles, semi final
1982, Budapest, women's singles, winner (gold)
1982, Budapest, women's doubles, runner-up (silver)
1982, Budapest, mixed doubles, winner (gold)
1984, Moscow, women's singles, quarter final
1984, Moscow, women's doubles, semi final
1984, Moscow, mixed doubles, semi final
1986, Prague, women's singles, quarter final
1986, Prague, women's doubles, runner-up (silver)
1988, Paris, mixed doubles, runner-up (silver)
1990, Gothenburg, women's doubles, quarter final
1992, Stuttgart, women's singles, winner (gold)
1992, Stuttgart, women's doubles, semi final
1992, Stuttgart, team competition, 2nd (silver)
1996, Bratislava, women's doubles, runner-up (silver)
1998, Eindhoven, women's singles, quarter final
European Youth Championships
1977, Vichy, women's singles, winner (gold) (juniors)
1978, Barcelona, women's singles, semi final (juniors)
1979, Rome, women's singles, winner (gold) (juniors)
European Top-12 Championships
1978, Prague, 2nd (silver)
1979, Kristianstad, 8th
1980, Munich, 2nd (silver)
1981, Miskolc, 2nd (silver)
1982, Nantes, 1st (gold)
1983, Cleveland, 3rd, (bronze)
1984, Bratislava, 2nd (silver)
1985, Barcelona, 1st (gold)
1986, Södertälje, 5th
1987, Basel, 4th
1988, Ljubljana, 2nd (silver)
1991, Den Bosch, 3rd (bronze)
1992, Vienna, 9th
1993, Copenhagen, 5th
1994, Arezzo, 7th
1995, Dijon, 5th
1996, Charleroi, 3rd (bronze)
1997, Eindhoven, 5th
1999, Split, 11th

== Books ==
- Bettine Vriesekoop; 弗里斯科普 (2008). 想念北京. 安徽教育出版社. ISBN 978-7-5336-5092-6.
- Bettine Vriesekoop (2009). Het Jaar van de Rat. Bezige Bij b.v., Uitgeverij De. ISBN 978-90-6005-889-3.
- Bettine Vriesekoop (2009). Bij de Chinees. Bezige Bij b.v., Uitgeverij De. ISBN 978-90-6005-969-2.
- Bettine Vriesekoop (2011). Duizend dagen in China. Nijgh & Van Ditmar, Uitgeverij. ISBN 978-90-388-9399-0.
- Bettine Vriesekoop (2013). Heimwee naar Peking. Nijgh & Van Ditmar, Uitgeverij. ISBN 978-90-388-9670-0.
- Bettine Vriesekoop (2015). Dochters van Mulan, Hoe Vrouwen China Veranderen. Brandt, Uitgeverij. ISBN 9789492037008.
- Bettine Vriesekoop (2021). Het China gevoel van Pearl S. Buck, Brandt, Uitgeverij, ISBN 978 94 93095 44 1

Awards
Preceded by Annie Borckink	Dutch Sportswoman of the Year; 1981	Succeeded by Annemarie Verstappen
Preceded by Ria Stalman	Dutch Sportswoman of the Year; 1985	Succeeded by Nelli Cooman
