= Mirjam Hooman-Kloppenburg =

Dutch table tennis player

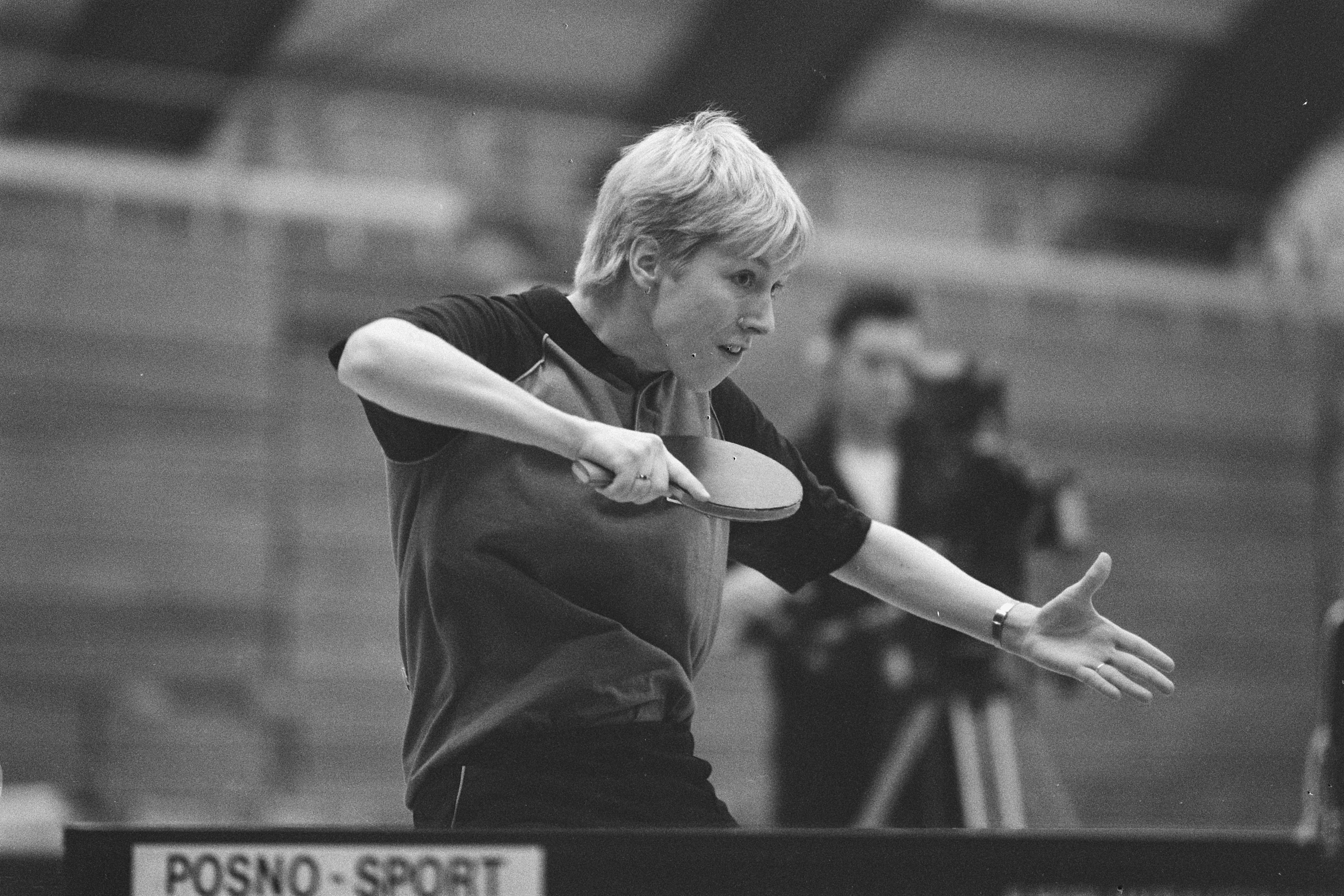

Personal information
- Full name: HOOMAN-KLOPPENBURG Mirjam
- Nationality: Netherlands

Sport
- Sport: Table tennis
- Playing style: Shakehand grip
Medal record
Women's table tennis
Representing Netherlands
World Cup
Bronze medal – third place	1994 Nimes	Women's Team
European Championships
Silver medal – second place	1992 Stuttgart	Women's Team
Bronze medal – third place	1992 Stuttgart	Singles
Bronze medal – third place	1992 Stuttgart	Doubles

Mirjam Hooman-Kloppenburg (born 4 January 1966) is a former female table tennis player from Netherlands. She won three medals in singles, doubles, and team events in the Table Tennis European Championships at Stuttgart in 1992. She also achieved a third team place in the Table Tennis World Cup in 1994, and competed at three Olympic Games.

== See also ==
- List of table tennis players
