= Canada at the 1988 Summer Olympics =

- IOC code: CAN
- NOC: Canadian Olympic Committee

in Seoul, South Korea 17 September 1988 – 2 October 1988
- Competitors: 328 (223 men and 105 women) in 23 sports
- Flag bearer: Carolyn Waldo
- Medals Ranked 19th: Gold 3 Silver 2 Bronze 5 Total 10

Summer Olympics appearances (overview)
- ~~1900~~; 1904; 1908; 1912; 1920; 1924; 1928; 1932; 1936; 1948; 1952; 1956; 1960; 1964; 1968; 1972; 1976; 1980; 1984; 1988; 1992; 1996; 2000; 2004; 2008; 2012; 2016; 2020; 2024; 2028

Other related appearances
- 1906 Intercalated Games

Canada competed at the 1988 Summer Olympics in Seoul, South Korea, held from 17 September to 2 October 1988. 328 competitors, 223 men and 105 women, took part in 193 events in 23 sports. Most Canadians remember these Olympics for Ben Johnson, who won the gold medal and set a world record in the men's 100 metres, before being disqualified and his record deleted after he tested positive for stanozolol.

== Medallists ==
Medal	Name	Sport	Event	Date
Gold	Carolyn Waldo	Synchronized swimming	Women's solo	30 September
Gold	Michelle Cameron; Carolyn Waldo	Synchronized swimming	Women's duet	1 October
Gold	Lennox Lewis	Boxing	Super heavyweight	2 October
Silver	Victor Davis; Sandy Goss; Tom Ponting; Mark Tewksbury	Swimming	Men's 4 × 100 metre medley relay	25 September
Silver	Egerton Marcus	Boxing	Middleweight	1 October
Bronze	Keltie Duggan; Allison Higson; Jane Kerr; Lori Melien; Patricia Noall; Andrea Nugent	Swimming	Women's 4 × 100 metre medley relay	24 September
Bronze	Cynthia Ishoy; Ashley Nicoll; Eva-Maria Pracht; Gina Smith	Equestrian	Team dressage	25 September
Bronze	Frank McLaughlin; John Millen	Sailing	Flying Dutchman	27 September
Bronze	Dave Steen	Athletics	Men's decathlon	29 September
Bronze	Ray Downey	Boxing	Light middleweight	29 September

== Competitors ==
The following is the list of number of competitors in the Games.

Sport	Men	Women	Total
Archery	3	1	4
Athletics	38	27	65
Basketball	12	0	12
Boxing	10	—	10
Canoeing	10	4	14
Cycling	7	4	11
Diving	3	3	6
Equestrian	4	7	11
Fencing	13	5	18
Field hockey	16	14	30
Gymnastics	6	8	14
Judo	6	—	6
Modern pentathlon	3	—	3
Rowing	30	10	40
Sailing	13	2	15
Shooting	10	3	13
Swimming	20	12	32
Synchronized swimming	—	3	3
Table tennis	2	1	3
Tennis	4	3	7
Weightlifting	3	—	3
Wrestling	11	—	11
Total	223	105	328

== Archery ==
Canada was represented by three men and one woman in Seoul.

Men

Athlete	Event	Ranking round		Round 1		Quarterfinals		Semifinals		Final	
Athlete	Event	Score	Rank	Score	Rank	Score	Rank	Score	Rank	Score	Rank
Denis Canuel	Individual	1201	58	Did not advance							
Daniel Desnoyers	Individual	1215	51	Did not advance							
John McDonald	Individual	1263	16 Q	292	24	Did not advance					
Denis Canuel; Daniel Desnoyers; John McDonald	Team	3679	16	—N/a				Did not advance			

Women

Athlete	Event	Ranking round		Round 1		Quarterfinals		Semifinals		Final	
Athlete	Event	Score	Rank	Score	Rank	Score	Rank	Score	Rank	Score	Rank
Brenda Cuming	Individual	1217	34	Did not advance							

== Athletics ==
Men
Track and road events

Athlete	Event	Heat Round 1		Heat Round 2		Semifinal		Final	
Athlete	Event	Time	Rank	Time	Rank	Time	Rank	Time	Rank
Ben Johnson	100 metres	DQ							
Desai Williams	100 metres	10.24	4 Q	10.16	4 Q	10.24	7 Q	10.11	6
Courtney Brown	200 metres	21.45	35 Q	21.18	27	Did not advance			
Cyprian Enweani	200 metres	20.65	3 Q	20.62	9 Q	20.57	9	Did not advance	
Atlee Mahorn	200 metres	20.55	1 Q	20.59	7 Q	20.43	5 Q	20.39	5
Anton Skerritt	400 metres	46.64	24 Q	46.08	26	Did not advance			
Simon Hoogewerf	800 metres	1:49.76	31 Q	1:45.99	6 Q	1:47.30	15	Did not advance	
Paul Osland	800 metres	1:47.16	8 q	1:48.02	27	Did not advance			
David Campbell	1500 metres	3:42.97	28	—N/a		Did not advance			
Doug Consiglio	1500 metres	3:55.31	51	—N/a		Did not advance			
Carey Nelson	5000 metres	14:15.94	42	—N/a		Did not advance			
Paul Williams	5000 metres	13:43.43	6 Q	—N/a		13:44.57	26	Did not advance	
Paul McCloy	10,000 metres	29:34.07	30	—N/a				Did not advance	
Paul Williams	10,000 metres	DNF		—N/a				Did not advance	
Art Boileau	Marathon	—N/a						2:18:20	28
Dave Edge	Marathon	—N/a						2:32:19	67
Peter Maher	Marathon	—N/a						2:24:49	46
Steve Kerho	110 metres hurdles	DNF		Did not advance					
Mark McKoy	110 metres hurdles	13.78	8 Q	13.56	4 Q	13.54	5 Q	13.61	7
John Graham	400 metres hurdles	50.30	15 Q	—N/a		51.33	15	Did not advance	
Graeme Fell	3000 metres steeplechase	8:51.25	25 Q	—N/a		8:19.99	13 q	8:21.73	11
Desai Williams; Atlee Mahorn; Cyprian Enweani; Brian Morrison; Andrew Mowatt (*)	4 × 100 metres relay	39.41	9 Q	—N/a		38.94	8 Q	38.93	7
John Graham; Carl Folkes; Paul Osland; Anton Skerritt	4 × 400 metres relay	3:09.52	16 q	—N/a		3:09.48	15	Did not advance	
Guillaume LeBlanc	20 kilometres walk	—N/a						1:21:29	10
François Lapointe	50 kilometres walk	—N/a						3:48:15	14

Field events

Athlete	Event	Qualification		Final	
Athlete	Event	Distance	Position	Distance	Position
Brian Marshall	High jump	2.22	19	Did not advance	
Milt Ottey	High jump	2.22	17	Did not advance	
Paul Just	Pole vault	5.30	17	Did not advance	
Glenroy Gilbert	Long jump	7.61	22	Did not advance	
Ian James	Long jump	7.52	25	Did not advance	
Bruny Surin	Long jump	7.73	15	Did not advance	
Edrick Floréal	Triple jump	16.11	18	Did not advance	
George Wright	Triple jump	16.09	19	Did not advance	
Ray Lazdins	Discus throw	57.94	21	Did not advance	
Steve Feraday	Javelin throw	73.32	28	Did not advance	
Mike Mahovlich	Javelin throw	69.44	31	Did not advance	

Combined events – Decathlon

Athlete	Event	100 m	LJ	SP	HJ	400 m	110H	DT	PV	JT	1500 m	Final	Rank
Mike Smith	Result	10.99	7.37	13.61	1.97	47.83	14.70	43.88	4.30	66.54	4:28.97	8083	14
Mike Smith	Points	863	903	704	776	917	886	744	702	837	751	8083	14
Dave Steen	Result	11.18	7.44	14.20	1.97	48.29	14.81	43.66	5.20	64.16	4:23.20	8328	3rd place, bronze medalist(s)
Dave Steen	Points	821	920	741	776	895	873	739	972	801	790	8328	3rd place, bronze medalist(s)

Women
Track and road events

Athlete	Event	Heat Round 1		Heat Round 2		Semifinal		Final	
Athlete	Event	Time	Rank	Time	Rank	Time	Rank	Time	Rank
Angela Bailey	100 metres	11.61	30 Q	11.29	18	Did not advance			
Angella Issajenko	100 metres	11.42	21 Q	11.27	17	Did not advance			
Julie Rocheleau	100 metres	11.60	29 q	11.75	31	Did not advance			
Charmaine Crooks	400 metres	53.58	29 Q	51.64	9 Q	51.63	15	Did not advance	
Marita Payne Wiggins	400 metres	52.70	15 Q	51.73	10 Q	50.29	11	Did not advance	
Jillian Richardson	400 metres	53.06	22 Q	52.33	16 Q	49.91	9	Did not advance	
Renée Bélanger	800 metres	2:04.74	23	—N/a		Did not advance			
Mary Burzminski	800 metres	2:02.85	17	—N/a		Did not advance			
Debbie Bowker	1500 metres	4:07.06	10 Q	—N/a				4:17.95	12
Angela Chalmers	1500 metres	4:08.64	17	—N/a				Did not advance	
Lynn Williams	1500 metres	4:04.20	4 Q	—N/a				4:00.86	5
Debbie Bowker	3000 metres	8:43.81	3 Q	—N/a				9:11.95	15
Angela Chalmers	3000 metres	8:48.60	12 Q	—N/a				9:04.75	14
Lynn Williams	3000 metres	8:48.70	13 Q	—N/a				8:38.43	8
Sue Lee	10,000 metres	31:51.42	5 Q	—N/a				31:50.51	8
Carole Rouillard	10,000 metres	32:09.08	10 q	—N/a				32:41.43	16
Nancy Tinari	10,000 metres	32:16.27	19 Q	—N/a				32:14.05	13
Lizanne Bussières	Marathon	—N/a						2:35:03	26
Odette Lapierre	Marathon	—N/a						2:30:56	11
Ellen Rochefort	Marathon	—N/a						2:36:44	31
Julie Rocheleau	100 metres hurdles	13.07	9 Q	12.90	8 Q	12.91	6 Q	12.99	6
Rosey Edeh	400 metres hurdles	56.59	22	—N/a		Did not advance			
Christine Wynn	400 metres hurdles	58.00	27	—N/a		Did not advance			
Angela Bailey; Angela Phipps; Angella Issajenko; Katie Anderson	4 × 100 metres relay	43.92	8 Q	—N/a		43.82	11	Did not advance	
Charmaine Crooks; Molly Killingbeck; Marita Payne Wiggins; Jillian Richardson; Esmie Lawrence (*)	4 × 400 metres relay	3:27.63	5 Q	—N/a				DNF	

Field events

Athlete	Event	Qualification		Final	
Athlete	Event	Distance	Position	Distance	Position
Tracy Smith	Long jump	NM		Did not advance	
Céline Chartrand	Javelin throw	54.10	27	Did not advance	

== Basketball ==
Summary

Key:

- OT – Overtime.

Team	Event	Group stage						Quarterfinal	Semi-final	Final / BM	
Team	Event	Opposition Score	Opposition Score	Opposition Score	Opposition Score	Opposition Score	Rank	Opposition Score	Opposition Score	Opposition Score	Rank
Canada men's	Men's tournament	Brazil; L 109–125	United States; L 70–76	Egypt; W 117–64	Spain; L 84–94	China; W 99–96	4 Q	Yugoslavia; L 73–95	Spain; W 96–91	Brazil; L 90–106	6

=== Men's tournament ===
Team roster

The following is the Canada roster in the men's basketball tournament of the 1988 Summer Olympics.

Canada men's national basketball team – 1988 Summer Olympics roster
Players
Coaches

Pos.	No.	Name	Age – Date of birth	Height	Club	Ctr.
	4	Norman Clarke	28 – 27 June 1960	1.87 m (6 ft 2 in)
SG	5	David Turcotte	23 – 10 July 1965	1.87 m (6 ft 2 in)	Colorado State Rams	(United States)
PG	6	Eli Pasquale	28 – 24 August 1960	1.85 m (6 ft 1 in)
SG	7	Karl Tilleman	27 – 1 November 1960	1.88 m (6 ft 2 in)
	8	Alan Kristmanson	26 – 5 November 1961	2.00 m (6 ft 7 in)
G	9	Jay Triano	29 – 21 September 1958	1.93 m (6 ft 4 in)
	10	Dwight Walton	23 – 23 March 1965
	11	John Hatch	26 – 23 February 1962	1.98 m (6 ft 6 in)
	12	Barry Mungar	26 – 4 November 1961	2.03 m (6 ft 8 in)
F/C	13	Romel Raffin	34 – 23 April 1954	2.06 m (6 ft 9 in)
	14	Wayne Yearwood	23 – 22 September 1964
F/C	15	Gerald Kazanowski	27 – 12 October 1960	2.06 m (6 ft 9 in)

Head coach

Jack Donohue

Legend

- Club – describes last
  club before the tournament
- Age – describes age
  on 17 September 1988

Group play

Pos	Team	Pld	W	L	PF	PA	PD	Pts	Qualification
1	United States	5	5	0	485	302	+183	10	Quarterfinals
2	Spain	5	4	1	484	435	+49	9	Quarterfinals
3	Brazil	5	3	2	590	522	+68	8	Quarterfinals
4	Canada	5	2	3	479	455	+24	7	Quarterfinals
5	China	5	1	4	433	527	−94	6	9th–12th classification round
6	Egypt	5	0	5	338	568	−230	5	9th–12th classification round

Source: FIBA archive
Rules for classification: 1) points; 2) head-to-head points; 3) head-to-head goal average; 4) head-to-head number of points scored.

17 September 1988

Brazil	125–109	Canada
Scoring by half: 56–45, 69–64

Jamsil Gymnasium, Seoul

20 September 1988

Canada	70–76	United States
Scoring by half: 42–40, 28–36

Jamsil Gymnasium, Seoul

21 September 1988

Canada	117–64	Egypt
Scoring by half: 61–32, 56–32

Jamsil Gymnasium, Seoul

23 September 1988

Canada	84–94	Spain
Scoring by half: 51–45, 33–49

Jamsil Gymnasium, Seoul

24 September 1988

Canada	99–96	China
Scoring by half: 56–52, 43–44

Jamsil Gymnasium, Seoul

Quarterfinals

26 September 1988
21:30

Boxscore

Yugoslavia	95–73	Canada
Scoring by half: 40–26, 55–47
Pts: Divac 17; Rebs: Vranković 9 Asts: Cvjetićanin, Divac, Petrović 2		Pts: Walton 17; Rebs: Mungar, Walton 7 Asts: Hatch 2

Jamsil Gymnasium, Seoul

Classification round 5–8

28 September 1988
14:30

Boxscore

Canada	96–91	Spain
Scoring by half: 41–42, 55–49
Pts: Triano 27; Rebs: Raffin 8 Asts: Raffin 4		Pts: Jiménez 16; Rebs: Jiménez 6 Asts: Solozábal 5

Jamsil Gymnasium, Seoul

Classification round 5/6

30 September 1988
09:45

Boxscore

Brazil	106–90	Canada
Scoring by half: 43–39, 63–51
Pts: Schmidt 41; Rebs: Pipoka 17; Asts: Villas Boas, Schmidt 2		Pts: Triano 29; Rebs: Hatch 10; Asts: Yearwood 3

Jamsil Gymnasium, Seoul

== Boxing ==
Athlete	Event	Round of 64	Round of 32	Round of 16	Quarterfinals	Semifinals	Final	
Athlete	Event	Opposition Result	Opposition Result	Opposition Result	Opposition Result	Opposition Result	Opposition Result	Rank
Scotty Olson	Light flyweight	Bye	Banian (PNG); W KO	McCullough (IRL); W 5–0	Carbajal (USA); L 0–5	Did not advance		
Jamie Pagendam	Featherweight	Amarjargal (MGL); W RSC R3	Kirkorov (BUL); L w/o	Did not advance				
Asif Dar	Lightweight	Bye	Kongrum (THA); L RSC R2	Did not advance				
Howard Grant	Light welterweight	Bye	Otto (GDR); W RSC R2	Myrberg (SWE); L 1–4	Did not advance			
Manny Sobral	Welterweight	Nyman (FIN); L 1–4	Did not advance					
Ray Downey	Light middleweight	López (ARG); W 5–0	Nieroba (FRG); W 3–2	Hussain (PAK); W 5–0	Kitel (SWE); W 5–0	Park (KOR); L 0–5	Did not advance	3rd place, bronze medalist(s)
Egerton Marcus	Middleweight	Bye	Legaspi (PHI); W KO	Dukić (YUG); W KO	Ottke (FRG); W 5–0	Shah (PAK); W 4–1	Maske (GDR); L 0–5	2nd place, silver medalist(s)
Brent Kosolofski	Light heavyweight	—N/a	El-Masri (LBN); W RSC R3	Magi (ITA); L 1–4	Did not advance			
Tom Glesby	Heavyweight	—N/a	Nielsen (DEN); W RSC R3	Alvics (HUN); L RSC R2	Did not advance			
Lennox Lewis	Super heavyweight	—N/a	Bye	Odera (KEN); W RSC R2	Kaden (GDR); W RSC R1	Zarenkiewicz (POL); W w/o	Bowe (USA); W RSC R2	1st place, gold medalist(s)

== Canoeing ==
Men

Athlete	Event	Heats		Repechage		Semifinals		Final	
Athlete	Event	Time	Rank	Time	Rank	Time	Rank	Time	Rank
Larry Cain	C-1 500 metres	Bye				1:56.24	4	Did not advance	
Larry Cain	C-1 1000 metres	4:09.50	2 SF	Bye		4:07.47	1 F	4:20.70	4
Dave Frost; Eric Smith	C-2 500 metres	1:46.93	5 R	1:53.07	2 SF	1:49.92	5	Did not advance	
Dave Frost; Eric Smith	C-2 1000 metres	3:58.14	4 R	4:06.93	3 SF	3:57.34	4	Did not advance	
Renn Crichlow	K-1 500 metres	1:47.53	6 R	Bye		1:46.51	4	Did not advance	
Carl Beaumier	K-1 1000 metres	4:00.63	5 R	3:55.27	3 SF	3:55.86	5	Did not advance	
Alwyn Morris; Hugh Fisher	K-2 500 metres	1:39.39	6 R	1:43.03	4 SF	1:36.00	4	Did not advance	
Don Brien; Colin Shaw	K-2 1000 metres	3:35.30	6 R	3:38.74	2 SF	3:30.29	5	Did not advance	
Don Brien; Colin Shaw; Kenneth Padvaiskas; Renn Crichlow	K-4 1000 metres	3:31.62	6 R	3:16.80	3 SF	3:15.03	4	Did not advance	

Women

Athlete	Event	Heats		Repechage		Semifinals		Final	
Athlete	Event	Time	Rank	Time	Rank	Time	Rank	Time	Rank
Caroline Brunet	K-1 500 metres	2:00.82	5 SF	—N/a		2:08.34	5	Did not advance	
Barbara Olmsted; Sheila Taylor	K-2 500 metres	1:52.45	4 R	1:54.56	2 SF	1:52.62	3 F	1:51.03	8
Barbara Olmsted; Caroline Brunet; Nancy Olmsted; Sheila Taylor	K-4 500 metres	1:43.52	5 R	1:43.63	4	—N/a		Did not advance	

== Cycling ==
Eleven cyclists, seven men and four women, represented Canada in 1988.

=== Road ===
Men

Athlete	Event	Time	Rank
Gervais Rioux	Road race	4:32:56	73
Yvan Waddell	Road race	4:32:56	29
Brian Walton	Road race	4:32:56	33
Chris Koberstein; David Spears; Yvan Waddell; Brian Walton	Team time trial	2:04:09.0	13

Women

Athlete	Event	Time	Rank
Sara Neil	Road race	2:00:52	39
Geneviève Robic-Brunet	Road race	2:00:52	4
Kelly-Ann Way	Road race	2:00:52	38

=== Track ===
Sprint

Athlete	Event	Qualification		Round 1	Repechage 1	Round 2	Repechage 2	Quarterfinals	Semifinals	Final	
Athlete	Event	Time Speed (km/h)	Rank	Opposition Time Speed (km/h)	Opposition Time Speed (km/h)	Opposition Time Speed (km/h)	Opposition Time Speed (km/h)	Opposition Time Speed (km/h)	Opposition Time Speed (km/h)	Opposition Time Speed (km/h)	Rank
Curt Harnett	Men's sprint	11.144	13 Q	Šustr (TCH), Réneau (BIZ); L	Carpenter (USA), Alwi (MAS), Lynch (BAR); W 11.26	Schoefs (BEL), Neiwand (AUS); L	Weber (FRG); L	Did not advance			
Beth Tabor	Women's sprint	12.588	12	Paraskevin-Young (USA), Speight (AUS); L	Yang (TPE); L	—N/a		Did not advance			

Time trial

Athlete	Event	Time	Rank
Curt Harnett	Time trial	1:06.291	11

Points race

Athlete	Event	Qualification			Final		
Athlete	Event	Laps	Points	Rank	Laps	Points	Rank
Gianni Vignaduzzi	Points race	–1 lap	3	12 Q	–3 laps	7	17

== Diving ==
Men

Athlete	Event	Qualification		Final	
Athlete	Event	Points	Rank	Points	Rank
David Bédard	3 metre springboard	532.62	20	Did not advance	
Larry Flewwelling	3 metre springboard	541.14	17	Did not advance	
David Bédard	10 metre platform	524.10	9 Q	499.53	11
Jeff Hirst	10 metre platform	453.99	20	Did not advance	

Women

Athlete	Event	Qualification		Final	
Athlete	Event	Points	Rank	Points	Rank
Barbara Bush	3 metre springboard	434.34	10 Q	429.18	11
Debbie Fuller	3 metre springboard	453.48	9 Q	450.30	9
Debbie Fuller	10 metre platform	366.42	9 Q	340.89	10
Wendy Fuller	10 metre platform	347.73	13	Did not advance	

== Equestrianism ==
=== Dressage ===
Athlete	Horse	Event	Qualification		Final	
Athlete	Horse	Event	Score	Rank	Score	Rank
Cindy Ishoy	Dynasty	Individual	1363	10 Q	1401	4
Ashley Nicoll	Reipo	Individual	1308	15 Q	1296	16
Eva-Maria Pracht	Emirage	Individual	1255	29	Did not advance	
Gina Smith	Malte	Individual	1298	18 Q	1326	12
Cindy Ishoy; Ashley Nicoll; Eva-Maria Pracht; Gina Smith	See above	Team	—N/a		3969	3rd place, bronze medalist(s)

=== Eventing ===
Athlete	Horse	Event	Dressage		Cross-country			Jumping			Total	
Athlete	Horse	Event	Penalties	Rank	Penalties	Total	Rank	Penalties	Total	Rank	Penalties	Rank
Nick Holmes-Smith	Espionage	Individual	71.80	31	45.60	117.40	17	0.00	117.40	14	117.40	14
Jo Tudor	Sparrow Hawk	Individual	75.60	37	DNF			EL				

=== Jumping ===
Athlete	Horse	Event	Qualification						Final					
Athlete	Horse	Event	Round 1		Round 2		Total		Round 1		Round 2		Total	
Athlete	Horse	Event	Score	Rank	Score	Rank	Score	Rank	Penalties	Rank	Penalties	Rank	Total	Rank
John Anderson	Goby	Individual	0.00	71	56.00	16	56.00	49	Did not advance					
Lisa Carlsen	Kahlua	Individual	69.50	1	73.50	1	143.00	1 Q	4.00	4 Q	DQ		DNF	
Mario Deslauriers	Box Car Willie	Individual	61.50	13	56.00	16	117.50	14 Q	15.75	30	Did not advance			
Ian Millar	Big Ben	Individual	69.50	1	56.00	16	125.50	8 Q	0.75	3 Q	12.25	18	13.00	15
Lisa Carlsen; Mario Deslauriers; Ian Millar; Laura Tidball-Balisky	Kahlua; Box Car Willie; Big Ben; Lavendel	Team	—N/a						16.00	3 Q	12.75	3	28.75	4

== Fencing ==
18 fencers, 13 men and 5 women, represented Canada in 1988.

Individual
Pool stages

Athlete	Event	Group Stage 1							Group Stage 2						Group Stage 3					
Athlete	Event	Opposition Result	Opposition Result	Opposition Result	Opposition Result	Opposition Result	Opposition Result	Rank	Opposition Result	Opposition Result	Opposition Result	Opposition Result	Opposition Result	Rank	Opposition Result	Opposition Result	Opposition Result	Opposition Result	Opposition Result	Rank
Stephen Angers	Men's foil	Borella (ITA); L 3–5	Lao (CHN); L 0–5	Soumagne (BEL); L 4–5	Bandeira (POR); W 5–1	Lee (HKG); L 3–5	—N/a	4 Q	Romankov (URS); L 0–5	Szekeres (HUN); L 3–5	Howe (GDR); L 3–5	Esperanza (ESP); L 0–5	Giasson (CAN); L 4–5	6	Did not advance					
Benoît Giasson	Men's foil	Zhang (CHN); L 0–5	Bel (FRA); W 5–4	Wagner (GDR); W 5–2	Youssef (LBN); W 5–4	Weng (HKG); W 5–3	—N/a	3 Q	Romankov (URS); L 3–5	Szekeres (HUN); L 1–5	Esperanza (ESP); L 4–5	Howe (GDR); W 5–3	Angers (CAN); W 5–4	5 Q	Schreck (FRG); L 2–5	Wendt (AUT); L 4–5	Mamedov (URS); W 5–3	Kajbjer (SWE); L 4–5	—N/a	4 Q
Luc Rocheleau	Men's foil	Groc (FRA); L 1–5	Emura (JPN); L 3–5	Sypniewski (POL); W 5–3	Wang (TPE); W 5–1	El-Khoury (LBN); W 5–1	—N/a	4 Q	Zych (POL); L 4–5	Mamedov (URS); L 4–5	McKenzie (GBR); W 5–4	Kanatsu (JPN); W 5–1	Kim (KOR); L 4–5	4 Q	Gosbee (GBR); L 4–5	Koretsky (URS); L 4–5	Bandach (POL); L 4–5	Lao (CHN); W 5–4	—N/a	4 Q
Jean-Marc Chouinard	Men's épée	Pásztor (HUN); L 4–5	Vánky (SWE); L 3–5	Du (CHN); L 5–5*	Paz (COL); W 5–4	—N/a		5	Did not advance											
Alain Côté	Men's épée	Ma (CHN); L 2–5	Fernández (ESP); L 5–5	Kühnemund (GDR); W 5–3	Fonseca (BRA); W 5–4	Al-Doseri (BRN); L 4–5	—N/a	5	Did not advance											
Michel Dessureault	Men's épée	Pantano (ITA); L 1–5	Nagele (AUT); L 4–5	Kernohan (GBR); W 5–3	Jahrami (KUW); W 5–2	Faraj (BRN); L 3–5	—N/a	3 Q	Kühnemund (GDR); L 1–5	Poffet (SUI); L 3–5	di Tella (ARG); W 5–2	Fernández (ESP); L 5–5	—N/a	3 Q	Brill (NZL); L 3–5	Mazzoni (ITA); L 3–5	Gaille (SUI); W 5–4	Fonseca (BRA); W 5–1	Ma (CHN); W 5–4	3 Q
Wulfe Balk	Men's sabre	Mindirgasov (URS); L 0–5	Dalla Barba (ITA); L 1–5	Becker (FRG); L 0–5	Kościelniakowski (POL); L 2–5	Lee (KOR); W 5–0	—N/a	5 Q	Nébald (HUN); L 0–5	Etropolski (BUL); L 4–5	Scalzo (ITA); L 3–5	Mormando (USA); L 2–5	—N/a	5	Did not advance					
Jean-Marie Banos	Men's sabre	Etropolski (BUL); L 0–5	Pogosov (URS); L 2–5	Guichot (FRA); L 4–5	Zheng (CHN); L 4–5	Lofton (USA); W 5–4	Avila (BRA); W 5–0	5 Q	Etropolski (BUL); L 4–5	Delrieu (FRA); L 1–5	Nolte (FRG); L 1–5	Piguła (POL); W 5–2	—N/a	5	Did not advance					
Jean-Paul Banos	Men's sabre	Etropolski (BUL); L 1–5	Gedővári (HUN); L 2–5	Delrieu (FRA); L 1–5	Jia (CHN); W 5–1	Slade (GBR); W 5–4	Alger (PHI); W 5–3	4 Q	Marin (ITA); L 0–5	Lamour (FRA); L 3–5	Mindirgasov (URS); L 4–5	García (ESP); W 5–4	—N/a	4 Q	Guichot (FRA); L 1–5	Alshan (URS); L 3–5	Becker (FRG); L 4–5	Scalzo (ITA); L 4–5	Bujdosó (HUN); L 3–5	6
Madeleine Philion	Women's foil	Zalaffi (ITA); L 1–5	Stefanek (HUN); W 5–4	Królikowska (POL); W 5–2	Morikawa (JPN); L 1–5	—N/a		3 Q	Tufan (ROU); L 4–5	Voshchakina (URS); W 5–4	Królikowska (POL); W 5–3	Modaine (FRA); W 5–4	Luan (CHN); L 4–5	3 Q	Sin (KOR); L 1–5	Vaccaroni (ITA); L 4–5	Glikina (URS); L 1–5	Bau (FRG); W 5–3	McIntosh (GBR); W 5–3	5
Jacynthe Poirier	Women's foil	Gandolfi (ITA); L 1–5	Tak (KOR); W 5–2	Voshchakina (URS); W 5–3	Mariéthoz (SUI); L 0–5	—N/a		4 Q	Bilodeaux (USA); L 4–5	Stefanek (HUN); L 0–5	McIntosh (GBR); L 3–5	Thurley (GBR); W 5–2	Zhu (CHN); L 3–5	5	Did not advance					
Thalie Tremblay	Women's foil	Thurley (GBR); L 4–5	Tufan (ROU); L 0–5	Spennato (FRA); L 3–5	Piros (SUI); W 5–3	—N/a		4 Q	Tak (KOR); L 4–5	Fichtel (FRG); L 0–5	Spennato (FRA); L 1–5	Sobczak (POL); L 4–5	Gandolfi (ITA); W 5–2	6	Did not advance					

Elimination phase

Athlete	Event	Round 1	Round 2	Round 3	Repechage				Quarterfinals	Semifinals	Final	
Athlete	Event	Round 1	Round 2	Round 3	Round 1	Round 2	Round 3	Round 4	Quarterfinals	Semifinals	Final	
Athlete	Event	Opposition Result	Opposition Result	Opposition Result	Opposition Result	Opposition Result	Opposition Result	Opposition Result	Opposition Result	Opposition Result	Opposition Result	Rank
Benoît Giasson	Men's foil	Gátai (HUN); L 6–10	Did not advance		Wendt (AUT); L 5–10	Did not advance						
Luc Rocheleau	Men's foil	Zych (POL); L 3–10	Did not advance		Gosbee (GBR); W 10–6	Gátai (HUN); L 1–10	Did not advance					
Michel Dessureault	Men's épée	Riboud (FRA); L 3–10	Did not advance		Gaille (SUI); L 9–10	Did not advance						

Team

Athlete	Event	Group Stage				Round of 16	Quarterfinals	Semifinals	Final	
Athlete	Event	Opposition Result	Opposition Result	Opposition Result	Rank	Opposition Result	Opposition Result	Opposition Result	Opposition Result	Rank
Stephen Angers; Benoît Giasson; Danek Nowosielski; Luc Rocheleau	Men's foil	Soviet Union; L 1–9	Poland; L 2–9	Hong Kong; W 9–1	3	Did not advance				
Ian Bramall; Jean-Marc Chouinard; Alain Côté; Michel Dessureault; Danek Nowosielski	Men's épée	Soviet Union; L 3–9	Netherlands; W 8–7	—N/a	2 Q	Switzerland; L 6–9	Did not advance			
Wulfe Balk; Jean-Marie Banos; Jean-Paul Banos; Bruno Deschênes; Tony Plourde	Men's sabre	Soviet Union; L 1–9	Poland; L 3–9	China; W 9–7	3	Did not advance				
Marie-Huguette Cormier; Madeleine Philion; Jacynthe Poirier; Shelley Steiner; Thalie Tremblay	Women's foil	Hungary; L 6–8	South Korea; L 3–9	—N/a	3	Did not advance				

== Gymnastics ==
=== Artistic ===
==== Men ====
Team

Athlete	Event	Qualification							
Athlete	Event	Apparatus						Total	Rank
Athlete	Event	F	PH	R	V	PB	HB	Total	Rank
Lorne Bobkin	Team	19.500	19.050	18.600	19.350	19.300	18.800	114.600	56
Philippe Chartrand	Team	9.800	18.950	19.350	18.600	19.550	19.550	105.800	86
Curtis Hibbert	Team	19.750 Q	18.750	19.400	19.450	19.700 Q	19.700 Q	116.750	21 Q
Alan Nolet	Team	19.050	19.100	18.950	19.050	18.700	19.250	114.100	65
Brad Peters	Team	19.400	19.450	19.250	19.100	19.400	19.450	116.050	34 Q
James Rozon	Team	18.900	18.850	18.800	19.200	19.150	19.200	114.100	65
Total	Team	96.850	95.650	95.750	96.150	97.100	97.300	578.800	9

Individual

Athlete	Event	Qualification	Apparatus						Total	Rank
Athlete	Event	Qualification	F	PH	R	V	PB	HB	Total	Rank
Curtis Hibbert	All-around	58.375	9.800	9.900	9.850	9.600	9.700	9.600	116.825	22
Curtis Hibbert	Floor	9.875	9.650	—N/a					19.525	8
Curtis Hibbert	Parallel bars	9.850	—N/a				9.825	—N/a	19.675	6
Curtis Hibbert	Horizontal bar	9.850	—N/a					9.825	19.675	7
Brad Peters	All-around	58.025	9.800	9.700	9.800	9.750	9.900	9.500	116.475	26

==== Women ====
Team

Athlete	Event	Qualification					
Athlete	Event	Apparatus				Total	Rank
Athlete	Event	V	UB	BB	F	Total	Rank
Monica Covacci	Team	19.300	18.875	19.125	19.400	76.700	50 q
Cathy Giancaspro	Team	19.000	18.850	18.400	19.200	75.450	74
Larissa Lowing	Team	19.100	19.375	18.775	18.975	76.225	57
Christina McDonald	Team	18.325	19.250	18.575	18.925	75.075	77
Janine Rankin	Team	19.275	19.475	18.850	19.425	77.025	41 q
Lori Strong	Team	19.400	19.550	19.150	19.075	77.175	38 q
Total	Team	96.075	96.650	94.825	96.200	383.750	11

Individual

Athlete	Event	Qualification	Apparatus				Total	Rank
Athlete	Event	Qualification	V	UB	BB	F	Total	Rank
Monica Covacci	All-around	38.350	9.800	9.800	9.725	9.750	77.425	22
Janine Rankin	All-around	38.512	9.775	9.675	9.125	9.700	76.787	31
Lori Strong	All-around	38.587	0.000	9.225	9.750	9.150	66.712	36

=== Rhythmic ===
Athlete	Event	Qualification						Final						
Athlete	Event	Hoop	Rope	Clubs	Ribbon	Total	Rank	Qualification	Hoop	Rope	Clubs	Ribbon	Total	Rank
Mary Fuzesi	Individual	9.600	9.700	9.800	9.600	38.700	12 Q	19.350	9.700	9.800	9.800	9.800	58.450	10
Lise Gautreau	Individual	9.150	9.000	9.400	9.400	36.950	32	Did not advance						

== Hockey ==
Summary

Key:

- FT – After full time.
- P – Match decided by penalty-shootout.

Team	Event	Group stage						Semifinal	Final / BM	
Team	Event	Opposition Score	Opposition Score	Opposition Score	Opposition Score	Opposition Score	Rank	Opposition Score	Opposition Score	Rank
Canada men's	Men's tournament	West Germany; L 1–3	Great Britain; L 0–3	Soviet Union; D 0–0	India; L 1–5	South Korea; D 1–1	6	Spain; L 0–2	Kenya; W 3–1	11
Canada women's	Women's tournament	Australia; D 1–1	South Korea; L 1–3	West Germany; L 1–2	—N/a		4	Argentina; W 2–1	West Germany; L 2–4	6

=== Men's tournament ===
Team roster

- Ross Rutledge (captain)
- Nick Sandhu
- Rick Albert
- Patrick Burrows
- Paul "Bubli" Chohan
- Chris Gifford
- Wayne Grimmer
- Ranjeet Rai
- Peter Milkovich
- Trevor Porritt
- Ian Bird
- Doug Harris
- Michael Muller
- Pat Caruso
- Ajay Dube (gk)
- Ken Goodwin (gk)
- Head Coach: Trevor Clark

Group play

Pos	Team	Pld	W	D	L	GF	GA	GD	Pts	Qualification
1	West Germany	5	4	1	0	13	3	+10	9	Semi-finals
2	Great Britain	5	3	1	1	12	5	+7	7	Semi-finals
3	India	5	2	1	2	9	7	+2	5	5–8th place semi-finals
4	Soviet Union	5	2	1	2	5	10	−5	5	5–8th place semi-finals
5	South Korea (H)	5	0	2	3	5	10	−5	2	9–12th place semi-finals
6	Canada	5	0	2	3	3	12	−9	2	9–12th place semi-finals

Source: FIH
(H) Hosts

18 September 1988
13:30

West Germany	3–1	Canada
Fisher 23'; Blöcher 29'; Reck 50'	Report	Gifford 8'

Umpires:
K Bajwa (PAK)
Ron Lathouwers (NED)

20 September 1988
09:00

Great Britain	3–0	Canada
Sherwani 3'; Barber 40'; Dodds 63'	Report

Umpires:
Patrick van Beneden (BEL)
Amjarit Dhak (KEN)

22 September 1988
13:30

Soviet Union	0–0	Canada
	Report

Umpires:
A Gantz (CHI)
K Bajwa (PAK)

24 September 1988
15:15

Canada	1–5	India
Rutledge 22'	Report	M. Singh 11', 29'; Sebastian 32'; Fernandis 55'; Baladadalaisah 56'

Umpires:
Amjarit Dhak (KEN)
Iwo Sakaida (JPN)

26 September 1988
15:15

Canada	1–1	South Korea
Sandhu 19'	Report	Chung Kye-suk 12'

Umpires:
Richard Kentwell (USA)
Rob Lathouwers (NED)

Classification 9th-12th

28 September 1988
09:00

Spain	2–0	Canada
I. Escudé 15'; Ji. Escudé 46'	Report

Umpires:
Don Prior (AUS)
Adriano de Vecchi (ITA)

11th place match

29 September 1988
15:15

Canada	3–1	Kenya
Sandhu 17'; Porritt 24'; Rutledge 31'	Report	Akatsa 44'

Umpires:
Nikolai Stepanov (URS)
Richard Kentwell (USA)

=== Women's tournament ===
The women's field hockey team from Canada competed for the second time at the Summer Olympics.

Team roster

- Sharon Bayes (gk)
- Wendy Baker (gk)
- Deb Covey
- Lisa Lyn
- Laura Branchaud
- Sandra Levy
- Kathryn Johnson
- Melanie Slade
- Penny Cooper
- Shona Schleppe
- Michelle Conn
- Liz Czenczek
- Sheila Forshaw
- Nancy Charlton
- Sara Ballantyne
- Sharon Creelman
- Head Coach: Marina van der Merwe

Group play

Pos	Team	Pld	W	D	L	GF	GA	GD	Pts	Qualification
1	South Korea	3	2	1	0	12	7	+5	5	Semi-finals
2	Australia	3	1	2	0	7	6	+1	4	Semi-finals
3	West Germany	3	1	0	2	3	6	−3	2	5th–8th place classification
4	Canada	3	0	1	2	3	6	−3	1	5th–8th place classification

Source: FIH

21 September 1988
15:15

Australia	1–1	Canada
Bowman 50'	Report	Forshaw 12'

Umpires:
A Poelmans (NED)
Jean Robertson (GBR)

23 September 1988
13:30

South Korea	3–1	Canada
Park 25', 26'; Seo H. 70+'	Report	Johnson 28'

Umpires:
Laura Crespo (ARG)
Jolanda Mohlmann (GBR)

25 September 1988
10:45

Canada	1–2	West Germany
Lyn 49'	Report	Blumenberg 26'; Jungjohann 51'

Umpires:
Laura Crespo (ARG)
A Poelmans (NED)

Classification 5th-8th place

27 September 1988
11:00

Argentina	1–2 (a.e.t.)	Canada
Palma 67'	Report	Forshaw 33'; Creelman 85'

Umpires:
Jean Robertson (GBR)
Jan Hadfield (AUS)

Fifth place match

29 September 1988
09:00

West Germany	4–2	Canada
Blumenberg 14', 59', 64'; Schmid 57'	Report	Forshaw 18', 52'

Umpires:
Dominique Ache (BEL)
Jean Robertson (GBR)

== Judo ==
Athlete	Event	Round of 64	Round of 32	Round of 16	Quarterfinals	Semifinals	Repechage			Final	
Athlete	Event	Round of 64	Round of 32	Round of 16	Quarterfinals	Semifinals	Round 1	Round 2	Round 3	Final	
Athlete	Event	Opposition Result	Opposition Result	Opposition Result	Opposition Result	Opposition Result	Opposition Result	Opposition Result	Opposition Result	Opposition Result	Rank
Phil Takahashi	60 kg	Bye	Idir (ALG); L Ippon	Did not advance							
Craig Weldon	65 kg	Quellmalz (GDR); L Yuko	Did not advance								
Glenn Beauchamp	71 kg	Al-Najadah (KUW); W Ippon	Moslih (YAR); W Ippon	Swain (USA); L Yusei-gachi	Did not advance						
Kevin Doherty	78 kg	Bye	An (KOR); W Keikoku	Lam (HKG); W Ippon	Legień (POL); L Waza-ari	Did not advance	—N/a		García (ARG); W Chui	Varayev (URS); L Ippon	5
Louis Jani	86 kg	Bye	Vincent (NZL); L Ippon	Did not advance							
Joe Meli	95 kg	—N/a	Bye	Fazi (ITA); L Koka	Did not advance						

== Modern pentathlon ==
Three male pentathletes represented Canada in 1988.

Athlete	Event	Riding (show jumping)			Fencing (épée one touch)			Swimming (300 m freestyle)			Shooting (Rapid fire pistol)			Running (4000 m)			Total points	Final rank
Athlete	Event	Penalties	Rank	MP points	Results	Rank	MP points	Time	Rank	MP points	Points	Rank	MP Points	Time	Rank	MP Points	Total points	Final rank
Nicholas Fekete	Individual	76	15	1024	28	43	711	3:34.37	39	1160	192	17	956	14:37.88	53	934	4785	40
Barry Kennedy	Individual	330	52	770	29	39	728	3:38.23	49	1128	194	11	1000	13:58.52	34	1051	4677	44
Lawrence Keyte	Individual	68	13	1032	22	58	609	3:42.90	56	1092	191	22	934	13:15.28	13	1180	4847	33
Nicholas Fekete; Barry Kennedy; Lawrence Keyte	Team	474	9	2826	79	15	2048	10:55.50	15	3380	577	5	2890	41:51.68	12	3165	14309	10

== Rowing ==
Men

Athlete	Event	Heats		Repechage		Semifinals		Final	
Athlete	Event	Time	Rank	Time	Rank	Time	Rank	Time	Rank
Gord Henry	Single sculls	7:51.83	5 R	7:37.48	5	Did not advance			
Bruce Ford; Pat Walter	Double sculls	6:29.94	4 R	6:46.55	3 SF	6:37.95	5 FB	7:07.31	10
Paul Douma; Doug Hamilton; Mel LaForme; Robert Mills	Quadruple sculls	5:54.01	3 SF	Bye		6:00.55	6 FB	5:58.06	9
Don Dickison; David Johnson	Coxless pair	6:57.59	6 R	7:13.07	5	Did not advance			
Ian McKerlich; Pat Newman; Dave Ross	Coxed pair	7:25.16	4 R	7:18.60	3 SF	7:06.21	5 FB	7:18.89	10
Darby Berkhout; Gord Henry; John Ossowski; Bruce Robertson; Raymond Collier	Coxless four	6:22.42	4 R	6:16.88	2 SF	6:22.35	6 FB	6:16.74	11
Harold Backer; John Houlding; Robert Marland; Terry Paul; Brian Saunderson	Coxed four	6:15.21	5 R	6:33.05	3 SF	6:17.36	6 FB	6:44.95	9
Don Telfer; Kevin Neufeld; Jason Dorland; Andy Crosby; Paul Steele; Grant Main; Jamie Schaffer; John Wallace; Brian McMahon	Eight	5:36.81	2 R	5:37.06	2 FA	—N/a		5:54.26	6

Women

Athlete	Event	Heats		Repechage		Semifinals		Final	
Athlete	Event	Time	Rank	Time	Rank	Time	Rank	Time	Rank
Heather Hattin	Single sculls	8:15.04	3 SF	Bye		7:56.97	4 FB	8:08.69	10
Silken Laumann; Kay Worthington	Double sculls	7:46.89	5 R	7:36.80	3 FB	—N/a		8:03.56	7
Kirsten Barnes; Sarah Ann Ogilvie	Coxless pair	8:09.51	3 R	8:11.49	3 FB	—N/a		8:09.10	7
Heather Clarke; Tricia Smith; Lesley Thompson-Willie; Jane Tregunno; Jennifer Walinga	Coxed four	7:31.02	4 R	7:29.71	3 FB	—N/a		7:19.86	7

== Sailing ==
Men

Athlete	Event	Race							Net points	Final rank
Athlete	Event	1	2	3	4	5	6	7	Net points	Final rank
Gord McIlquham; Nigel Cochrane	470	14	16	5.7	3	~~19~~	17	16	71.7	8

Women

Athlete	Event	Race							Net points	Final rank
Athlete	Event	1	2	3	4	5	6	7	Net points	Final rank
Gail Johnson; Karen Johnson	470	~~19~~	14	18	13	18	16	14	93	10

Open

Athlete	Event	Race							Net points	Final rank
Athlete	Event	1	2	3	4	5	6	7	Net points	Final rank
Richard Myerscough	Division II	14	13	28	~~52~~	16.2	13	13	97.2	12
Lawrence Lemieux	Finn	19	10	26	18	3	19	~~27~~	95	11
Bruce MacDonald; Ross MacDonald	Star	5.7	17	18	3	0	20	~~28~~	63.7	6
Dave Sweeney; Kevin Smith	Tornado	~~17~~	15	16	14	15	8	15	83	10
Philip Gow; Paul Thomson; Stuart Flinn	Soling	14	18	19	3	~~27~~	19	16	89	12
Frank McLaughlin; John Millen	Flying Dutchman	10	11.7	0	~~18~~	15	11.7	0	48.4	3rd place, bronze medalist(s)

== Shooting ==
Men

Athlete	Event	Qualification		Final	
Athlete	Event	Points	Rank	Points	Rank
Michael Ashcroft	50 m rifle prone	597	5 Q	698.5	8
Mark Howkins	25 m rapid fire pistol	584	29	Did not advance	
Mart Klepp	10 m air rifle	588	14	Did not advance	
Mart Klepp	50 m rifle three positions	1157	36	Did not advance	
David Lee	50 m running target	573	21	Did not advance	
Guy Lorion	10 m air rifle	585	25	Did not advance	
Jean-François Sénécal	50 m rifle three positions	1164	25	Did not advance	
Pat Vamplew	50 m rifle prone	594	24	Did not advance	

Women

Athlete	Event	Qualification		Final	
Athlete	Event	Points	Rank	Points	Rank
Christina Ashcroft	10 m air rifle	387	22	Did not advance	
Christina Ashcroft	50 m rifle three positions	577	19	Did not advance	
Sharon Bowes	10 m air rifle	394	4 Q	493.1	7
Sharon Bowes	50 m rifle three positions	584	4 Q	680.5	5

Mixed

Athlete	Event	Qualification		Final	
Athlete	Event	Points	Rank	Points	Rank
Don Kwasnycia	Skeet	144	27	Did not advance	
George Leary	Trap	140	33	Did not advance	
Susan Nattrass	Trap	141	30	Did not advance	
John Primrose	Trap	190	18	Did not advance	

== Swimming ==
Men

Athlete	Event	Heats		Final A/B	
Athlete	Event	Time	Rank	Time	Rank
Gary Anderson	200 m individual medley	2:04.00	5 FA	2:06.35	8
Mark Andrews	50 m freestyle	23.44	17 FB	23.64	15
Vlastimil Cerny	100 m butterfly	54.66	11 FB	54.79	12
Chris Chalmers	1500 m freestyle	15:23.22	16	Did not advance	
Jon Cleveland	200 m breaststroke	2:16.87	5 FA	2:17.10	7
Victor Davis	100 m breaststroke	1:02.48	2 FA	1:02.38	4
Sandy Goss	100 m freestyle	50.81	14 FB	50.73	10
Cam Grant	100 m breaststroke	1:05.10	31	Did not advance	
Cam Grant	200 m breaststroke	2:17.62	9 FB	2:18.36	14
Jon Kelly	200 m butterfly	1:59.40	5 FA	1:59.48	7
Jon Kelly	400 m individual medley	4:24.62	11 FB	4:25.02	12
Mike Meldrum	400 m individual medley	4:31.74	23	Did not advance	
Sean Murphy	100 m backstroke	56.20	6 FA	56.32	8
Sean Murphy	200 m backstroke	2:03.81	17	Did not advance	
Turlough O'Hare	400 m freestyle	3:55.35	17 FB	3:54.33	11
Tom Ponting	100 m butterfly	54.31	7 FA	54.09	7
Tom Ponting	200 m butterfly	2:00.08	7 FA	1:58.91	4
Harry Taylor	1500 m freestyle	15:30.31	19	Did not advance	
Mark Tewksbury	100 m backstroke	56.20	6 FA	56.09	5
Mark Tewksbury	200 m backstroke	2:04.02	18 FB	2:03.79	12
Gary Vandermeulen	400 m freestyle	3:57.99	26	Did not advance	
Darren Ward	200 m individual medley	2:07.84	21	Did not advance	
Mark Andrews; Steven Vandermeulen; Vlastimil Cerny; Sandy Goss	4 × 100 m freestyle relay	3:23.85	9	Did not advance	
Turlough O'Hare; Sandy Goss; Donald Haddow; Gary Vandermeulen; Darren Ward (*)	4 × 200 m freestyle relay	7:26.28	8 FA	7:24.91	8
Mark Tewksbury; Victor Davis; Tom Ponting; Sandy Goss	4 × 100 m medley relay	3:44.56	3 FA	3:39.28	2nd place, silver medalist(s)

Women

Athlete	Event	Heats		Final A/B	
Athlete	Event	Time	Rank	Time	Rank
Mojca Cater	200 m butterfly	2:13.21	10 FB	2:12.66	9
Guylaine Cloutier	200 m breaststroke	2:34.36	16 FB	2:33.55	15
Keltie Duggan	100 m breaststroke	1:10.95	10 FB	1:10.58	10
Allison Higson	100 m breaststroke	1:09.39	3 FA	1:08.86	4
Allison Higson	200 m breaststroke	2:29.67	4 FA	2:29.60	7
Allison Higson	200 m individual medley	2:19.54	14 FB	Withdrew	
Jane Kerr	100 m freestyle	57.55	20	Did not advance	
Jane Kerr	200 m freestyle	2:04.92	28	Did not advance	
Jane Kerr	100 m butterfly	1:02.91	20	Did not advance	
Donna McGinnis	200 m butterfly	DQ		Did not advance	
Lori Melien	100 m backstroke	1:04.29	12 FB	1:03.87	12
Lori Melien	200 m backstroke	2:20.45	19	Did not advance	
Patricia Noall	200 m freestyle	2:02.31	14 FB	2:00.77	9
Patricia Noall	400 m freestyle	4:15.90	16 FB	4:14.70	13
Andrea Nugent	50 m freestyle	26.60	19	Did not advance	
Andrea Nugent	100 m freestyle	57.33	17	Did not advance	
Andrea Nugent	100 m butterfly	1:03.69	23	Did not advance	
Kristin Topham	50 m freestyle	26.50	15 FB	26.45	12
Debby Wurzburger	800 m freestyle	8:36.24	9	Did not advance	
Kathy Bald; Patricia Noall; Andrea Nugent; Jane Kerr; Kristin Topham (*); Allison Higson (*)	4 × 100 m freestyle relay	3:49.20	8 FA	3:46.75	6
Lori Melien; Allison Higson; Jane Kerr; Andrea Nugent; Keltie Duggan (*); Patricia Noall (*)	4 × 100 m medley relay	4:14.23	5 FA	4:10.49	3rd place, bronze medalist(s)

== Synchronized swimming ==
Three synchronized swimmers represented Canada in 1988.

Athlete	Event	Figures		Qualification			Final		
Athlete	Event	Points	Rank	Points	Total (Figures + Qualification)	Rank	Points	Total (Figures + Final)	Rank
Michelle Cameron	Solo	96.683	5	Did not advance					
Karin Larsen	Solo	92.250	8	Did not advance					
Carolyn Waldo	Solo	101.150	1 Q	98.200	199.350	1 Q	99.000	200.150	1st place, gold medalist(s)
Michelle Cameron; Carolyn Waldo	Duet	98.917	1	98.400	197.317	1 Q	98.800	197.717	1st place, gold medalist(s)

== Table tennis ==
Men

Athlete	Event	Group Stage								Round of 16	Quarterfinal	Semifinal	Final	
Athlete	Event	Opposition Result	Opposition Result	Opposition Result	Opposition Result	Opposition Result	Opposition Result	Opposition Result	Rank	Opposition Result	Opposition Result	Opposition Result	Opposition Result	Rank
Joe Ng	Singles	Panský (TCH); L 0–3	Prean (GBR); L 1–3	Vong (HKG); L 2–3	Sta (TUN); W 3–0	Álvarez (DOM); W 3–0	Yoo (KOR); L 0–3	Kucharski (POL); L 2–3	6	Did not advance				
Joe Ng; Horatio Pintea	Doubles	Birocheau / Gatien (FRA); W 2–0	Omotara / Musa (NGR); W 2–0	Rozenberh / Mazunov (URS); W 2–0	Jiang / Xu (CHN); L 0–2	Lupulesku / Primorac (YUG); L 0–2	Huang / Wu (TPE); L 0–2	Hosnani / Choy (MRI); W 2–0	4	Did not advance				

Women

Athlete	Event	Group Stage						Round of 16	Quarterfinal	Semifinal	Final	
Athlete	Event	Opposition Result	Opposition Result	Opposition Result	Opposition Result	Opposition Result	Rank	Opposition Result	Opposition Result	Opposition Result	Opposition Result	Rank
Mariann Domonkos	Singles	Kovtun (URS); L 0–3	Alejo (DOM); W 3–0	Gee (USA); W 3–2	Jiao (CHN); L 1–3	Urbán (HUN); L 0–3	4	Did not advance				

== Tennis ==
Men

Athlete	Event	Round of 64	Round of 32	Round of 16	Quarterfinals	Semifinals	Final	
Athlete	Event	Opposition Result	Opposition Result	Opposition Result	Opposition Result	Opposition Result	Opposition Result	Rank
Grant Connell	Singles	Fitzgerald (AUS); W 6–4, 4–6, 6–2, 6–2	Sánchez (ESP); L 4–6, 4–6, 2–6	Did not advance				
Martin Laurendeau	Singles	Järryd (SWE); L 6–7, 6–4, 5–7, 5–7	Did not advance					
Chris Pridham	Singles	Jaite (ARG); L 1–6, 3–6, 2–6	Did not advance					
Glenn Michibata; Grant Connell	Doubles	—N/a	Christensen / Tauson (DEN); L 5–7, 2–6, 7–6, 5–7	Did not advance				

Women

Athlete	Event	Round of 64	Round of 32	Round of 16	Quarterfinals	Semifinals	Final	
Athlete	Event	Opposition Result	Opposition Result	Opposition Result	Opposition Result	Opposition Result	Opposition Result	Rank
Carling Bassett-Seguso	Singles	Tauziat (FRA); L 6–7, 1–6	Did not advance					
Jill Hetherington	Singles	Berger (ISR); W 6–1, 6–4	Shriver (USA); L 2–6, 3–6	Did not advance				
Helen Kelesi	Singles	Miró (BRA); L 5–7, 5–7	Did not advance					
Carling Bassett-Seguso; Jill Hetherington	Doubles	—N/a		Sabatini / Paz (ARG); W 7–6, 5–7, 20–18	Graf / Kohde-Kilsch (FRG); L 3–6, 6–3, 2–6	Did not advance		

== Weightlifting ==
Athlete	Event	Snatch		Clean & jerk		Total	Rank
Athlete	Event	Result	Rank	Result	Rank	Total	Rank
Langis Côté	67.5 kg	137.5	6	160.0	11	297.5	10
Guy Greavette	90 kg	152.5	9	185.0	10	337.5	10
Denis Garon	100 kg	160.0	10	222.5	2	382.5	6

== Wrestling ==
Greco-Roman

Athlete	Event	Group Stage								Final	
Athlete	Event	Opposition Result	Opposition Result	Opposition Result	Opposition Result	Opposition Result	Opposition Result	Opposition Result	Rank	Opposition Result	Rank
Doug Yeats	68 kg	Julfalakyan (URS); L 0–15	Cărare (ROU); L passivity	Did not advance			—N/a		12	Did not advance	
Doug Cox	90 kg	Steinbach (FRG); L 0–16	Foy (USA); L fall	Did not advance				—N/a	9	Did not advance	
Steve Marshall	100 kg	Ahokas (FIN); W passivity	Wroński (POL); L 0–2	Koslowski (USA); L passivity	Did not advance				6	Did not advance	
Dan Payne	130 kg	Gerovski (BUL); L passivity	Wrocławski (POL); L fall	Did not advance			—N/a		6	Did not advance	

Freestyle

Athlete	Event	Group Stage								Final	
Athlete	Event	Opposition Result	Opposition Result	Opposition Result	Opposition Result	Opposition Result	Opposition Result	Opposition Result	Rank	Opposition Result	Rank
Chris Woodcroft	52 kg	Tohuzov (URS); L 0–16	Torkan (IRI); L fall	Did not advance					10	Did not advance	
Lawrence Holmes	57 kg	Grzywiński (POL); W 4–3	Kumar (IND); L 3–6	Scheibe (FRG); W 8–6	Nagy (HUN); L fall	Did not advance			5	Did not advance	
Gary Bohay	62 kg	Li (CHN); W 15–10	Yinga (CMR); W fall	Kaygusuz (TUR); W 6–5	Fallah (IRI); L 1–6	Sargsyan (URS); L 1–8	Did not advance		4	Schillaci (ITA); L 0–5	8
David McKay	68 kg	Al-Masri (JOR); W 15–0	Santoro (FRA); W 7–1	Brown (AUS); L 1–7	Şeker (TUR); W 9–7	Leipold (FRG); W 11–7	Carr (USA); L 0–9	Park (KOR); L 4–13	3	Rauhala (FIN); W 4–1	5
Gary Holmes	74 kg	Ould Habib (MTN); W 15–0	Serna (ESP); W 16–0	Beudet (FRA); W 6–4	Yoon (KOR); L 4–7	Monday (USA); L 0–6	Did not advance		6	Did not advance	
Chris Rinke	82 kg	Han (KOR); L 2–6	Jollien (SUI); W 10–1	Afghan (IRI); W 7–6	Lohyňa (TCH); L 0–10	Did not advance		—N/a	7	Did not advance	
Doug Cox	90 kg	Scherr (USA); L 7–10	Verma (IND); L 0–15	Did not advance				—N/a	10	Did not advance	
Clark Davis	100 kg	Bye	Jo (KOR); L 2–6	Javkhlantögs (MGL); L 3–8	Did not advance			—N/a	5	Did not advance	
Dan Payne	130 kg	Ramsaran (MRI); W fall	Montesdeoca (ESP); W passivity	Sandurski (POL); L 3–4	Schröder (GDR); L 3–14	—N/a			3	Atanasov (BUL); L 3–14	6
