= Mauritius at the 1988 Summer Olympics =

- IOC code: MRI
- NOC: Mauritius Olympic Committee

in Seoul
- Competitors: 8 (6 men and 2 women) in 5 sports
- Flag bearer: Navind Ramsaran
- Medals: Gold 0 Silver 0 Bronze 0 Total 0

Summer Olympics appearances (overview)
- 1984; 1988; 1992; 1996; 2000; 2004; 2008; 2012; 2016; 2020; 2024

Mauritius competed at the 1988 Summer Olympics in Seoul, South Korea.

== Competitors ==
The following is the list of number of competitors in the Games.

Sport	Men	Women	Total
Athletics	1	2	3
Boxing	1	–	1
Table tennis	2	0	2
Weightlifting	1	–	1
Wrestling	1	–	1
Total	6	2	8

== Athletics ==
Men
Track and road events

Athlete	Event	Heat Round 1		Heat Round 2		Semifinal		Final	
Athlete	Event	Time	Rank	Time	Rank	Time	Rank	Time	Rank
Judex Lefou	110 metres hurdles	14.73	33	Did not advance					

Women
Track and road events

Athlete	Event	Heat Round 1		Heat Round 2		Semifinal		Final	
Athlete	Event	Time	Rank	Time	Rank	Time	Rank	Time	Rank
Sheila Seebaluck	800 metres	2:08.93	27	—		Did not advance			
Maryse Justin	Marathon	—						2:50:00	51

== Boxing ==
Athlete	Event	Round of 64	Round of 32	Round of 16	Quarterfinals	Semifinals	Final	
Athlete	Event	Opposition Result	Opposition Result	Opposition Result	Opposition Result	Opposition Result	Opposition Result	Rank
Teekaram Rajcoomar	Bantamweight	Bye	Torres (VEN); L 0–5	Did not advance				

== Table tennis ==
Men

Athlete	Event	Group Stage								Round of 16	Quarterfinal	Semifinal	Final	
Athlete	Event	Opposition Result	Opposition Result	Opposition Result	Opposition Result	Opposition Result	Opposition Result	Opposition Result	Rank	Opposition Result	Opposition Result	Opposition Result	Opposition Result	Rank
Alain Choo Choy	Singles	Ding (AUT); L 0–3	Harczi (HUN); L 0–3	Chen (CHN); L 0–3	Bankole (NGR); L 0–3	Lo (HKG); L 0–3	Ali (IRQ); L 1–3	Wu (TPE); L 0–3	8	Did not advance				
Gilany Hosnani	Singles	Waldner (SWE); L 0–3	Chih (TPE); L 0–3	Xu (CHN); L 0–3	Maringgi (INA); L 0–3	Böhm (FRG); L 0–3	Griffiths (NZL); L 1–3	Birocheau (FRA); L 0–3	8	Did not advance				
Alain Choo Choy; Gilany Hosnani	Doubles	Jiang / Xu (CHN); L 0–2	Gatien / Birocheau (FRA); L 0–2	Lupulesku / Primorac (YUG); L 0–2	Musa / Omotara (NGR); L 0–2	Huang / Wu (TPE); L 0–2	Mazunov / Rozenberh (URS); L 0–2	Ng / Pintea (CAN); L 0–2	8	—	Did not advance			

== Weightlifting ==
Athlete	Event	Snatch		Clean & jerk		Total	Rank
Athlete	Event	Result	Rank	Result	Rank	Total	Rank
José Moirt	82.5 kg	110.0	19	130.0	17	240.0	17

== Wrestling ==
Greco-Roman

Athlete	Event	Group Stage								Final	
Athlete	Event	Opposition Result	Opposition Result	Opposition Result	Opposition Result	Opposition Result	Opposition Result	Opposition Result	Rank	Opposition Result	Rank
Navind Ramsaran	130 kg	El-Hadad (EGY); L Fall	Deguchi (JPN); L Fall	Did not advance			—		5	Did not advance	

Freestyle

Athlete	Event	Group Stage								Final	
Athlete	Event	Opposition Result	Opposition Result	Opposition Result	Opposition Result	Opposition Result	Opposition Result	Opposition Result	Rank	Opposition Result	Rank
Navind Ramsaran	130 kg	Payne (CAN); L Fall	Bye	Baumgartner (USA); L 0–15	Did not advance	—			5	Did not advance	
