= Nigeria at the 1988 Summer Olympics =

- IOC code: NGR
- NOC: Nigeria Olympic Committee

in Seoul
- Competitors: 70 in 8 sports
- Flag bearer: Yusuf Alli
- Medals: Gold 0 Silver 0 Bronze 0 Total 0

Summer Olympics appearances (overview)
- 1952; 1956; 1960; 1964; 1968; 1972; 1976; 1980; 1984; 1988; 1992; 1996; 2000; 2004; 2008; 2012; 2016; 2020; 2024; 2028

Nigeria competed at the 1988 Summer Olympics in Seoul, South Korea.

== Competitors ==
The following is the list of number of competitors in the Games.

Sport	Men	Women	Total
Athletics	17	6	23
Boxing	7	–	7
Football	17	–	17
Judo	3	–	3
Table tennis	4	2	6
Tennis	3	0	3
Weightlifting	4	–	4
Wrestling	6	–	6
Total	62	8	70

== Athletics ==
Men
Track and road events

Athlete	Event	Heat Round 1		Heat Round 2		Semifinal		Final	
Athlete	Event	Time	Rank	Time	Rank	Time	Rank	Time	Rank
Olapade Adeniken	100 metres	10.56	42 Q	10.30	13 Q	10.33	11	Did not advance	
Isiaq Adeyanju	100 metres	10.45	22 Q	10.32	14 q	10.60	15	Did not advance	
Chidi Imoh	100 metres	10.62	44 Q	11.44	48	Did not advance			
Olapade Adeniken	200 metres	20.77	8 Q	20.92	16 Q	20.67	12	Did not advance	
Isiaq Adeyanju	200 metres	21.10	25 Q	21.01	25	Did not advance			
Innocent Egbunike	400 metres	46.02	11 Q	45.02	7 Q	44.74	8 Q	44.72	5
Sunday Uti	400 metres	47.08	30 Q	45.33	17	Did not advance			
Ado Maude	800 metres	1:50.48	40	Did not advance					
Abbas Mohamed	Marathon	—N/a						2:35:26	70
Yohanna Waziri	Marathon	—N/a						2:29:14	60
Victor Edet; Olapade Adeniken; Isiaq Adeyanju; Olatunji Olobia; Davidson Ezinwa (*); Abdullahi Tetengi (*)	4 × 100 metres relay	39.15	6 Q	—N/a		39.05	10	Did not advance	
Sunday Uti; Moses Ugbisien; Henry Amike; Innocent Egbunike	4 × 400 metres relay	3:06.59	10 Q	—N/a		3:01.13	4 Q	3:02.50	7

Field events

Athlete	Event	Qualification		Final	
Athlete	Event	Distance	Position	Distance	Position
Yusuf Alli	Long jump	7.73	14	Did not advance	
Joseph Taiwo	Triple jump	16.42	9 q	16.46	9
Adewale Olukoju	Discus throw	54.44	23	Did not advance	

Women
Track and road events

Athlete	Event	Heat Round 1		Heat Round 2		Semifinal		Final	
Athlete	Event	Time	Rank	Time	Rank	Time	Rank	Time	Rank
Falilat Ogunkoya	200 metres	23.12	14 Q	22.88	17	Did not advance			
Mary Onyali	200 metres	22.82	4 Q	22.89	13 Q	22.43	9	Did not advance	
Airat Bakare	400 metres	52.83	17 Q	52.86	21	Did not advance			
Maria Usifo	100 metres hurdles	13.50	20 q	DNF		Did not advance			
Maria Usifo	400 metres hurdles	55.99	18	—N/a		Did not advance			
Falilat Ogunkoya; Kehinde Vaughan; Airat Bakare; Mary Onyali	4 × 400 metres relay	3:30.21	9	—N/a				Did not advance	

Field events

Athlete	Event	Qualification		Final	
Athlete	Event	Distance	Position	Distance	Position
Grace Apiafi	Shot put	15.06	22	Did not advance	
Grace Apiafi	Discus throw	49.84	19	Did not advance	

== Boxing ==
Athlete	Event	Round of 64	Round of 32	Round of 16	Quarterfinals	Semifinals	Final	
Athlete	Event	Opposition Result	Opposition Result	Opposition Result	Opposition Result	Opposition Result	Opposition Result	Rank
Mohammed Sabo	Bantamweight	Bye	Lowey (IRL); L 1–4	Did not advance				
Anthony Konyegwachie	Featherweight	Dumitrescu (ROU); L 0–5	Did not advance					
Blessing Onoko	Lightweight	Lubulwa (UGA); W RSC R3	Hegazi (EGY); L 0–5	Did not advance				
Liasu Braimoh	Light welterweight	Bye	Jeon (KOR); L RSC R3	Did not advance				
Adewale Adegbusi	Welterweight	Bye	Joseph (ANT); W KO	Martínez (ESP); W 5–0	Dydak (POL); L 1–4	Did not advance		
Osmond Imadiyi	Light heavyweight	—N/a	Kanika (ZAI); W KO	Škaro (YUG); L 0–5	Did not advance			
Ovwigbo Uba	Super heavyweight	—N/a	Bye	Schnieders (FRG); L 0–5	Did not advance			

== Football ==
Summary

Key:

- A.E.T – After extra time.
- P – Match decided by penalty-shootout.

Team	Event	Group stage				Quarterfinal	Semi-final	Final / BM	
Team	Event	Opposition Score	Opposition Score	Opposition Score	Rank	Opposition Score	Opposition Score	Opposition Score	Rank
Nigeria men's	Men's tournament	Brazil; L 0–4	Yugoslavia; L 1–3	Australia; L 0–1	4	Did not advance			

Team roster

Head coach: (West Germany) Manfred Höner

No.	Pos.	Player	DoB	Age	Caps	Club	Tournament games	Tournament goals	Minutes played	Sub off	Sub on	Cards yellow/red
1	GK	David Ngodiga	23 October 1962	25	?	(Nigeria) Flash Flamingoes	1	0	90	0	0	0
2	DF	Emeka Ezeugo	16 December 1965	22	?	(Nigeria) Enugu Rangers	2	0	77	1	1	0
3	DF	Andrew Uwe	12 October 1967	20	?	(Nigeria) Leventis United	3	0	270	0	0	(yellow card) 3
4	DF	Ademola Adeshina	4 June 1964	24	?	(Belgium) SC Lokeren	3	0	270	0	0	(yellow card) 1
5	DF	Chidi Nwanu	1 January 1967	21	?	(Nigeria) ACB Lagos	2	0	180	0	0	0
6	DF	Dahiru Sadi	10 December 1965	22	?	(Nigeria) Ranchers Bees	3	0	270	0	0	0
7	DF	Augustine Eguavoen	19 August 1965	23	?	(Belgium) K.A.A. Gent	3	0	270	0	0	0
8	MF	Sylvanus Okpala	5 May 1961	27	?	(Portugal) CS Marítimo	3	0	270	0	0	(yellow card) 1
9	FW	Dominic Iorfa	1 October 1962	25	?	(Nigeria) Ranchers Bees	2	0	112	2	0	0
10	MF	Samuel Okwaraji	19 March 1964	24	?	(West Germany) VfB Stuttgart	3	0	259	1	0	0
11	FW	Rashidi Yekini	23 October 1964	23	?	(Ivory Coast) Africa Sports	3	1	270	0	0	0
12	GK	Christian Obi	2 January 1967	21	?	(Nigeria) Julius Berger FC	2	0	180	0	0	0
13	DF	Bright Omokaro	24 February 1965	23	?	(Nigeria) Flash Flamingoes	1	0	45	1	0	0
14	MF	Osaro Obobaifo	1 August 1966	22	?	(Belgium) K.F.C. Winterslag	1	0	23	0	1	0
15	MF	Mike Obiku	24 September 1968	19	?	(Nigeria) Iwuanyanwu Nationale	2	0	125	1	1	(yellow card) 1
16	FW	Samson Siasia	14 August 1967	21	?	(Belgium) SC Lokeren	3	0	210	0	1	0
17	FW	Wole Odegbami	5 October 1962	25	?	(Nigeria) JIB Rock Strikers	2	0	49	0	2	0
18	MF	Ndubuisi Okosieme	28 September 1966	21	?	(Nigeria) El-Kanemi Warriors	0	0	0	0	0	0
19	DF	Jude Agada	22 October 1965	22	?	(Nigeria) Enugu Rangers	0	0	0	0	0	0
20	MF	Henry Nwosu	14 June 1963	25	?	(Nigeria) ACB Lagos	0	0	0	0	0	0

Group play

Pos	Team	Pld	W	D	L	GF	GA	GD	Pts
1	Brazil	3	3	0	0	9	1	+8	6
2	Australia	3	2	0	1	2	3	−1	4
3	Yugoslavia	3	1	0	2	4	4	0	2
4	Nigeria	3	0	0	3	1	8	−7	0

Source: FIFA
18 September 1988

Brazil	4–0	Nigeria
Edmar 59'; Romário 74', 84'; Bebeto 86'	Report

Daejeon Hanbat Stadium, Daejeon

20 September 1988

Nigeria	1–3	Yugoslavia
Yekini 88'	Report	Stojković 35', 67'; Šabanadžović 49'

Daejeon Hanbat Stadium, Daejeon

22 September 1988

Australia	1–0	Nigeria
Kosmina 76'	Report

Dongdaemun Stadium, Seoul

== Judo ==
Athlete	Event	Round of 64	Round of 32	Round of 16	Quarterfinals	Semifinals	Repechage			Final	
Athlete	Event	Round of 64	Round of 32	Round of 16	Quarterfinals	Semifinals	Round 1	Round 2	Round 3	Final	
Athlete	Event	Opposition Result	Opposition Result	Opposition Result	Opposition Result	Opposition Result	Opposition Result	Opposition Result	Opposition Result	Opposition Result	Rank
Majemite Omagbaluwaje	65 kg	Bye	Ioannou (CYP); W Waza-ari	Carabetta (FRA); L Yusei-gachi	Did not advance						
Mamudu Adamu	78 kg	Metsola (FIN); L Chui	Did not advance								
West Iqiebor	86 kg	Bye	Carmona (BRA); L Hansoku-goshi	Did not advance							

== Table tennis ==
Men

Athlete	Event	Group Stage								Round of 16	Quarterfinal	Semifinal	Final	
Athlete	Event	Opposition Result	Opposition Result	Opposition Result	Opposition Result	Opposition Result	Opposition Result	Opposition Result	Rank	Opposition Result	Opposition Result	Opposition Result	Opposition Result	Rank
Yomi Bankole	Singles	Lo (HKG); L 0–3	Wu (TPE); L 0–3	Harczi (HUN); W 3–2	Choy (MRI); W 3–0	Ali (IRQ); W 3–1	Ding (AUT); L 0–3	Chen (CHN); L 1–3	6	Did not advance				
Atanda Musa	Singles	Miyazaki (JPN); L 0–3	López (VEN); W 3–0	Haberl (AUS); W 3–1	Ghorpade (IND); W 3–1	Grubba (POL); L 0–3	Primorac (YUG); W 3–1	Roßkopf (FRG); L 2–3	5	Did not advance				
Fatai Adeyemo; Yomi Bankole	Doubles	Ahn / Yoo (KOR); L 0–2	Kano / Kawai (BRA); W 2–1	Grubba / Kucharski (POL); L 0–2	Lo / Vong (HKG); L 0–2	Roßkopf / Fetzner (FRG); L 0–2	Gambra / Núñez (CHI); L 1–2	Saito / Watanabe (JPN); L 0–2	8	Did not advance				
Atanda Musa; Titus Omotara	Doubles	Huang / Wu (TPE); L 0–2	Ng / Pintea (CAN); L 0–2	Gatien / Birocheau (FRA); L 0–2	Choy / Hosnani (MRI); W 2–0	Mazunov / Rozenberh (URS); W 2–0	Jiang / Xu (CHN); L 0–2	Lupulesku / Primorac (YUG); L 2–1	6	Did not advance				

Women

Athlete	Event	Group Stage								Round of 16	Quarterfinal	Semifinal	Final	
Athlete	Event	Opposition Result	Opposition Result	Opposition Result	Opposition Result	Opposition Result	Opposition Result	Opposition Result	Rank	Opposition Result	Opposition Result	Opposition Result	Opposition Result	Rank
Iyabo Akanmu	Singles	Hong (KOR); L 0–3	Bátorfi (HUN); L 0–3	Nemes (FRG); L 0–3	Díaz (CHI); L 1–3	Kloppenburg (NED); L 1–3	—N/a		6	Did not advance				
Kuburat Owolabi	Singles	Hoshino (JPN); L 1–3	Fazlić (YUG); L 0–3	Nolten (FRG); L 2–3	Liyau (PER); W 3–2	Hyun (KOR); L 0–3	—N/a		5	Did not advance				
Iyabo Akanmu; Kuburat Owolabi	Doubles	Bulatova / Kovtun (URS); L 0–2	Perkučin / Fazlić (YUG); L 0–2	Bátorfi / Urbán (HUN); L 0–2	Chang / Lin (TPE); L 0–2	Mok / Hui (HKG); L 0–2	Bisiach / Tepper (AUS); W 2–0	Hyun / Yang (KOR); L 0–2	7	Did not advance				

== Tennis ==
Men

Athlete	Event	Round of 64	Round of 32	Round of 16	Quarterfinals	Semifinals	Final	
Athlete	Event	Opposition Result	Opposition Result	Opposition Result	Opposition Result	Opposition Result	Opposition Result	Rank
Sadiq Abdullahi	Singles	Seguso (USA); L 4–6, 3–6, 2–6	Did not advance					
Tony Mmoh	Singles	Kowalski (POL); W 6–2, 6–4, 6–4	Schapers (NED); L 6–4, 3–6, 1–6, 6–4, 1–6	Did not advance				
Nduka Odizor	Singles	Sánchez Vicario (ESP); L 2–6, 5–7, 3–6	Did not advance					
Tony Mmoh; Nduka Odizor	Doubles	Bye	Forget / Leconte (FRA); L 3–6, 2–6, 7–6, 6–7	Did not advance				

== Weightlifting ==
Athlete	Event	Snatch		Clean & jerk		Total	Rank
Athlete	Event	Result	Rank	Result	Rank	Total	Rank
Lawrence Iquaibom	67.5 kg	125.0	14	160.0	11	285.0	12
Muyiwa Odusanya	82.5 kg	150.0	9	170.0	11	320.0	9
Olusola Awosina	90 kg	140.0	14	192.5	7	332.5	12
Gilbert Ojadi Aduche	+110 kg	NM		DNF			

== Wrestling ==
Freestyle

Athlete	Event	Group Stage								Final	
Athlete	Event	Opposition Result	Opposition Result	Opposition Result	Opposition Result	Opposition Result	Opposition Result	Opposition Result	Rank	Opposition Result	Rank
Amos Ojo Adekunle	48 kg	Şükrüoğlu (TUR); L 1–8	Delgado (COL); L 6–8	Did not advance				—N/a	7	Did not advance	
Garba Lame	52 kg	Stecyk (POL); L Fall	Seyhanlı (TUR); L 1–16	Did not advance					10	Did not advance	
Monday Eguabor	74 kg	Westendorf (GDR); L 1–4	Sofiadi (BUL); L 0–15	Did not advance					13	Did not advance	
Victor Kodei	82 kg	Doyle (GBR); W 15–9	Rodríguez (PUR); W Fall	Zayar (SYR); W 7–1	Schultz (USA); L Fall	Tambovtsev (URS); L Fall	Did not advance		5	Did not advance	
Christian Iloanusi	90 kg	Ota (JPN); L 6–12	Maruwala (PAK); L Passivity	Did not advance				—N/a	10	Did not advance	
Jackson Bidei	100 kg	Sezgin (TUR); L Fall	Did not advance					—N/a	11	Did not advance	

== See also ==
- Nigeria at the 1986 Commonwealth Games
- Nigeria at the 1990 Commonwealth Games
