= Tunisia at the 1988 Summer Olympics =

- IOC code: TUN
- NOC: Tunisian Olympic Committee

in Seoul
- Competitors: 41 in 6 sports
- Flag bearer: Sofiane Ben Letaief
- Medals: Gold 0 Silver 0 Bronze 0 Total 0

Summer Olympics appearances (overview)
- 1960; 1964; 1968; 1972; 1976; 1980; 1984; 1988; 1992; 1996; 2000; 2004; 2008; 2012; 2016; 2020; 2024

Tunisia competed at the 1988 Summer Olympics in Seoul, South Korea. It was the nation's seventh appearance at the Olympics, after missing the 1980 Summer Olympics because of its partial support for the United States boycott.

== Competitors ==
The following is the list of number of competitors in the Games.

Sport	Men	Women	Total
Athletics	2	0	2
Football	20	–	20
Swimming	0	1	1
Table tennis	2	1	3
Volleyball	12	0	12
Wrestling	3	–	3
Total	39	2	41

== Athletics ==
Men
Track & road events

Athlete	Event	Heat		Quarterfinal		Semifinal		Final	
Athlete	Event	Result	Rank	Result	Rank	Result	Rank	Result	Rank
Mahmoud El-Kalboussi	1500 m	3:43.72	31	Did not advance					
Fethi Baccouche	3000 m steeplechase	8:38.67	7 Q	—		8:31.36	10	Did not advance	

== Football ==
Summary

Key:

- A.E.T – After extra time.
- P – Match decided by penalty-shootout.

Team	Event	Group stage				Quarterfinal	Semi-final	Final / BM	
Team	Event	Opposition Score	Opposition Score	Opposition Score	Rank	Opposition Score	Opposition Score	Opposition Score	Rank
Tunisia men's	Men's tournament	Sweden; D 2–2	West Germany; L 1–4	China; D 0–0	3	Did not advance			

Group play

Team	Pld	W	D	L	GF	GA	GD	Pts
Sweden	3	2	1	0	6	3	+3	5
West Germany	3	2	0	1	8	3	+5	4
Tunisia	3	0	2	1	3	6	−3	2
China	3	0	1	2	0	5	−5	1

September 17, 1988

Sweden	2–2	Tunisia

Daegu Civic Stadium, Daegu

September 19, 1988

Tunisia	1–4	West Germany

Busan Gudeok Stadium, Busan

September 21, 1988

China	0–0	Tunisia

Busan Gudeok Stadium, Busan

== Swimming ==
Women

Athlete	Event	Heat		Semifinal		Final	
Athlete	Event	Time	Rank	Time	Rank	Time	Rank
Senda Gharbi	200 metre freestyle	27.34	29	Did not advance			
Senda Gharbi	100 metre freestyle	58.51	33	Did not advance			
Senda Gharbi	200 metre freestyle	2:06.60	30	Did not advance			
Senda Gharbi	400 metre freestyle	4:34.67	30	Did not advance			

== Table tennis ==
Athlete	Event	Group stage	Round of 32	Round of 16	Quarterfinals	Semifinals	Final	
Athlete	Event	Opposition Result	Opposition Result	Opposition Result	Opposition Result	Opposition Result	Opposition Result	Rank
Lotfi Joudi	Men's singles	0-7	Did not advance					
Mourad Sta	Men's singles	0-7	Did not advance					
Mourad Sta; Sofiane Ben Letaief	Men's doubles	0-7	Did not advance					
Feiza Ben Aïssa	Women's singles	0-5	Did not advance					

== Volleyball ==
Summary

Team	Event	Group stage						Semi-final	Final / BM	
Team	Event	Opposition Score	Opposition Score	Opposition Score	Opposition Score	Opposition Score	Rank	Opposition Score	Opposition Score	Rank
Tunisia men's	Men's tournament	Argentina; L 0–3	France; L 0–3	Netherlands; L 0–3	Japan; L 0–3	United States; L 0–3	6	Italy; L 0–3	South Korea; L 0–3	12

=== Men's team competition ===
==== Pool B ====
Pos	Team	Pld	W	L	Pts	SW	SL	SR	SPW	SPL	SPR	Qualification
1	United States	5	5	0	10	15	3	5.000	263	155	1.697	Semifinals
2	Argentina	5	3	2	8	11	7	1.571	219	211	1.038	Semifinals
3	France	5	3	2	8	10	7	1.429	222	190	1.168	5th–8th semifinals
4	Netherlands	5	3	2	8	10	7	1.429	202	183	1.104	5th–8th semifinals
5	Japan	5	1	4	6	5	12	0.417	182	225	0.809	9th–12th semifinals
6	Tunisia	5	0	5	5	0	15	0.000	101	225	0.449	9th–12th semifinals

Date		Score		Set 1	Set 2	Set 3	Set 4	Set 5	Total
18 Sep	Argentina	3–0	Tunisia	15–5	15–11	15–6			45–22
19 Sep	France	3–0	Tunisia	15–10	15–3	15–9			45–22
22 Sep	Netherlands	3–0	Tunisia	15–6	15–10	15–5			45–21
24 Sep	Japan	3–0	Tunisia	15–4	15–11	15–7			45–22
26 Sep	United States	3–0	Tunisia	15–4	15–6	15–4			45–14

==== 9th–12th semifinals ====
Date		Score		Set 1	Set 2	Set 3	Set 4	Set 5	Total
28 Sep	Italy	3–0	Tunisia	15–2	15–2	15–5			45–9

==== 11th place match ====
Date		Score		Set 1	Set 2	Set 3	Set 4	Set 5	Total
30 Sep	Tunisia	0–3	South Korea	11–15	9–15	7–15			27–45

==== Team roster ====
- Faycal Ben Amara
- Mohamed Sarsar
- Rachid Bousarsar
- Lotfi Ben Slimane
- Msaddak Lahmar
- Hedi Bousarsar
- Abderrazak Ben Messaoud
- Raouf Chenoufi
- Hichem Ben Amira
- Mourad Tebourski
- Abdelaziz Ben Abdallah
- Fethi Ghariani

Head coach: Hubert Wagner

== Wrestling ==
Men's Greco-Roman

Athlete	Event	Elimination Pool						Final round	
Athlete	Event	Round 1 Result	Round 2 Result	Round 3 Result	Round 4 Result	Round 5 Result	Round 6 Result	Final round Result	Rank
Mehdi Chaambi	−57 kg	Rifat Yildiz (FRG); L 0-12	Adrian Ponce (MEX); W 15-0	BYE	—			Did not advance	18
Habib Lakhal	−62 kg	Brahim Loksairi (MAR); L 1-2	Ahad Javansalehi (IRI); L 0-5	—				Did not advance	13

Men's Freestyle

Athlete	Event	Elimination Pool						Final round	
Athlete	Event	Round 1 Result	Round 2 Result	Round 3 Result	Round 4 Result	Round 5 Result	Round 6 Result	Final round Result	Rank
Mourad Zelfani	−57 kg	Waruingi Kimani (KEN); W 18-0	Khaltmaa Battuul (MGL); L 0-15	Valentin Ivanov (BUL); L T 1:04	—			Did not advance	17
