= Table tennis at the 1988 Summer Olympics – Men's doubles =

Table tennis at the Olympics

Table tennis – Men's doubles at the Games of the XXIV Olympiad
- Venue: Seoul National University Gymnasium
- Date: 23 to 30 September 1988
- Competitors: 64 from 23 nations

Medalists
| 1st place, gold medalist(s) | | Chen Longcan; Wei Qingguang | China |
| 2nd place, silver medalist(s) | | Ilija Lupulesku; Zoran Primorac | Yugoslavia |
| 3rd place, bronze medalist(s) | | Ahn Jae-hyung; Yoo Nam-kyu | South Korea |

These are the results of the men's doubles competition, one of two events for male competitors in table tennis at the 1988 Summer Olympics in Seoul.

== Group stage ==
=== Group A ===
| Rank | Athlete | W | L | GW | GL | PW | PL | CHN | SWE | JPN | GBR | HUN | IND | HKG | TUN |
|---|---|---|---|---|---|---|---|---|---|---|---|---|---|---|---|
| 1 | Chen Longcan and Wei Qingguang (CHN) | 7 | 0 | 14 | 1 | 304 | 214 | X | 2–0 | 2–0 | 2–0 | 2–1 | 2–0 | 2–0 | 2–0 |
| 2 | Jörgen Persson and Erik Lindh (SWE) | 6 | 1 | 12 | 2 | 292 | 218 | 0–2 | X | 2–0 | 2–0 | 2–0 | 2–0 | 2–0 | 2–0 |
| 3 | Yoshihito Miyazaki and Seiji Ono (JPN) | 4 | 3 | 9 | 6 | 282 | 245 | 0–2 | 0–2 | X | 2–0 | 1–2 | 2–0 | 2–0 | 2–0 |
| 4 | Carl Prean and Alan Cooke (GBR) | 4 | 3 | 8 | 7 | 337 | 325 | 0–2 | 0–2 | 0–2 | X | 2–0 | 2–0 | 2–0 | 2–1 |
| 5 | Tibor Klampár and Zsolt Kriston (HUN) | 4 | 3 | 9 | 9 | 337 | 323 | 1–2 | 0–2 | 2–1 | 0–2 | X | 2–1 | 2–0 | 2–1 |
| 6 | Kamlesh Mehta and Sujay Ghorpade (IND) | 2 | 5 | 5 | 10 | 266 | 286 | 0–2 | 0–2 | 0–2 | 0–2 | 1–2 | X | 2–0 | 2–0 |
| 7 | Liu Fuk Man and Chan Chi Ming (HKG) | 1 | 6 | 2 | 13 | 210 | 302 | 0–2 | 0–2 | 0–2 | 0–2 | 0–2 | 0–2 | X | 2–1 |
| 8 | Mourad Sta and Sofiane Ben Letaief (TUN) | 0 | 7 | 3 | 14 | 237 | 340 | 0–2 | 0–2 | 0–2 | 1–2 | 1–2 | 0–2 | 1–2 | X |

=== Group B ===
| Rank | Athlete | W | L | GW | GL | PW | PL | SWE | KOR | GBR | TPE | AUT | FRG | DOM | NZL |
|---|---|---|---|---|---|---|---|---|---|---|---|---|---|---|---|
| 1 | Jan-Ove Waldner and Mikael Appelgren (SWE) | 6 | 1 | 12 | 4 | 329 | 274 | X | 2–1 | 0–2 | 2–0 | 2–1 | 2–0 | 2–0 | 2–0 |
| 2 | Kim Ki-taik and Kim Wan (KOR) | 6 | 1 | 13 | 3 | 317 | 252 | 1–2 | X | 2–0 | 2–0 | 2–0 | 2–1 | 2–0 | 2–0 |
| 3 | Desmond Douglas and Skylet Andrew (GBR) | 5 | 2 | 11 | 6 | 330 | 305 | 2–0 | 0–2 | X | 2–1 | 1–2 | 2–1 | 2–0 | 2–0 |
| 4 | Chih Chin Long and Chih Chin-shui (TPE) | 4 | 3 | 9 | 7 | 300 | 286 | 0–2 | 0–2 | 1–2 | X | 2–0 | 2–1 | 2–0 | 2–0 |
| 5 | Ding Yi and Gottfried Bär (AUT) | 3 | 4 | 7 | 10 | 318 | 321 | 1–2 | 0–2 | 2–1 | 0–2 | X | 2–0 | 2–1 | 0–2 |
| 6 | Georg Böhm and Jürgen Rebel (FRG) | 2 | 5 | 7 | 10 | 295 | 300 | 0–2 | 1–2 | 1–2 | 1–2 | 0–2 | X | 2–0 | 2–0 |
| 7 | Mario Alvarez and Raymundo Fermin (DOM) | 1 | 6 | 3 | 12 | 220 | 304 | 0–2 | 0–2 | 0–2 | 0–2 | 1–2 | 0–2 | X | 2–0 |
| 8 | Barry Griffiths and Peter Jackson (NZL) | 1 | 6 | 2 | 12 | 231 | 298 | 0–2 | 0–2 | 0–2 | 0–2 | 2–0 | 0–2 | 0–2 | X |

=== Group C ===
| Rank | Athlete | W | L | GW | GL | PW | PL | CHN | YUG | TPE | CAN | FRA | NGR | URS | MRI |
|---|---|---|---|---|---|---|---|---|---|---|---|---|---|---|---|
| 1 | Jiang Jialiang and Xu Zengcai (CHN) | 7 | 0 | 14 | 2 | 332 | 254 | X | 2–0 | 2–1 | 2–0 | 2–1 | 2–0 | 2–0 | 2–0 |
| 2 | Ilija Lupulesku and Zoran Primorac (YUG) | 6 | 1 | 12 | 4 | 314 | 255 | 0–2 | X | 2–1 | 2–0 | 2–0 | 2–1 | 2–0 | 2–0 |
| 3 | Wu Wen-chia and Huang Huei-chieh (TPE) | 4 | 3 | 11 | 6 | 332 | 269 | 1–2 | 1–2 | X | 2–0 | 1–2 | 2–0 | 2–0 | 2–0 |
| 4 | Horatio Pintea and Gideon Joe Ng (CAN) | 4 | 3 | 8 | 6 | 258 | 254 | 0–2 | 0–2 | 0–2 | X | 2–0 | 2–0 | 2–0 | 2–0 |
| 5 | Jean-Philippe Gatien and Patrick Birocheau (FRA) | 4 | 3 | 9 | 8 | 318 | 317 | 1–2 | 0–2 | 2–1 | 0–2 | X | 2–0 | 2–1 | 2–0 |
| 6 | Atanda Musa and Titus Omotara (NGR) | 2 | 5 | 5 | 10 | 256 | 298 | 0–2 | 1–2 | 0–2 | 0–2 | 0–2 | X | 2–0 | 2–0 |
| 7 | Andrei Mazunov and Borys Rozenberh (URS) | 1 | 6 | 3 | 12 | 264 | 297 | 0–2 | 0–2 | 0–2 | 0–2 | 1–2 | 0–2 | X | 2–0 |
| 8 | Alain Choo Choy and Gilani Hosnani (MRI) | 0 | 7 | 0 | 14 | 165 | 295 | 0–2 | 0–2 | 0–2 | 0–2 | 0–2 | 0–2 | 0–2 | X |

=== Group D ===
| Rank | Athlete | W | L | GW | GL | PW | PL | KOR | POL | FRG | JPN | BRA | HKG | CHI | NGR |
|---|---|---|---|---|---|---|---|---|---|---|---|---|---|---|---|
| 1 | Yoo Nam-Kyu and Ahn Jae-Hyung (KOR) | 7 | 0 | 14 | 1 | 312 | 199 | X | 2–0 | 2–1 | 2–0 | 2–0 | 2–0 | 2–0 | 2–0 |
| 2 | Andrzej Grubba and Leszek Kucharski (POL) | 6 | 1 | 12 | 3 | 300 | 244 | 0–2 | X | 2–0 | 2–0 | 2–1 | 2–0 | 2–0 | 2–0 |
| 3 | Jörg Roßkopf and Steffen Fetzner (FRG) | 5 | 2 | 11 | 6 | 320 | 290 | 1–2 | 0–2 | X | 2–0 | 2–1 | 2–1 | 2–0 | 2–0 |
| 4 | Kiyoshi Saito and Takehiro Watanabe (JPN) | 4 | 3 | 8 | 7 | 265 | 284 | 0–2 | 0–2 | 0–2 | X | 2–1 | 2–0 | 2–0 | 2–0 |
| 5 | Claudio Kano and Carlos Kawai (BRA) | 2 | 5 | 8 | 10 | 329 | 335 | 0–2 | 1–2 | 1–2 | 1–2 | X | 2–0 | 2–0 | 1–2 |
| 6 | Lo Chuen Tsung and Vong Lu Veng (HKG) | 2 | 5 | 5 | 10 | 269 | 298 | 0–2 | 0–2 | 1–2 | 0–2 | 0–2 | X | 2–0 | 2–0 |
| 7 | Jorge Gambra and Marcos Núñez (CHI) | 1 | 6 | 2 | 13 | 232 | 305 | 0–2 | 0–2 | 0–2 | 0–2 | 0–2 | 0–2 | X | 2–1 |
| 8 | Fatai Adeyemo and Yom Bankole (NGR) | 1 | 6 | 3 | 13 | 249 | 321 | 0–2 | 0–2 | 0–2 | 0–2 | 2–1 | 0–2 | 1–2 | X |

== Knockout stage ==
Quarterfinals
A1 | Chen Longcan (CHN); Wei Qingguang (CHN) | 21 | 12 | 21
D2 | Andrzej Grubba (POL); Leszek Kucharski (POL) | 7 | 21 | 19
A2 | Jörgen Persson (SWE); Erik Lindh (SWE) | 13 | 11
D1 | Yoo Nam-kyu (KOR); Ahn Jae-hyung (KOR) | 21 | 21
C1 | Jiang Jialiang (CHN); Xu Zengcai (CHN) | 18 | 20
B2 | Kim Ki-taik (KOR); Kim Wan (KOR) | 21 | 22
C2 | Ilija Lupulesku (YUG); Zoran Primorac (YUG) | 21 | 19 | 21
B1 | Jan-Ove Waldner (SWE); Mikael Appelgren (SWE) | 19 | 21 | 19

Semifinals
A1 | Chen Longcan (CHN); Wei Qingguang (CHN) | 21 | 21
D1 | Yoo Nam-kyu (KOR); Ahn Jae-hyung (KOR) | 10 | 14
B2 | Kim Ki-taik (KOR); Kim Wan (KOR) | 21 | 21 | 15
C2 | Ilija Lupulesku (YUG); Zoran Primorac (YUG) | 23 | 19 | 21

Gold medal match
A1 | Chen Longcan (CHN); Wei Qingguang (CHN) | 20 | 21 | 21
C2 | Ilija Lupulesku (YUG); Zoran Primorac (YUG) | 22 | 8 | 9
Bronze medal match
D1 | Yoo Nam-kyu (KOR); Ahn Jae-hyung (KOR) | 21 | 21
B2 | Kim Ki-taik (KOR); Kim Wan (KOR) | 13 | 16
