= Table tennis at the 1988 Summer Olympics – Men's singles =

Table tennis at the Olympics

Table tennis – Men's singles at the Games of the XXIV Olympiad
- Olympic table tennis
- Venue: Seoul National University Gymnasium
- Date: 23 September to 1 October 1988
- Competitors: 64 from 35 nations

Medalists
1st place, gold medalist(s)		Yoo Nam-kyu	South Korea
2nd place, silver medalist(s)		Kim Ki-taik	South Korea
3rd place, bronze medalist(s)		Erik Lindh	Sweden

These are the results of the men's singles competition, one of two events for male competitors in table tennis at the 1988 Summer Olympics in Seoul.

== Group stage ==
=== Group A ===
Rank	Athlete	W	L	GW	GL	PW	PL	CHN	HUN	GBR	BEL	FRA	USA	BRA	TUN
1	Jiang Jialiang (CHN)	7	0	21	1	459	323	X	3–1	3–0	3–0	3–0	3–0	3–0	3–0
2	Tibor Klampár (HUN)	6	1	19	8	543	445	1–3	X	3–1	3–2	3–2	3–0	3–0	3–0
3	Alan Cooke (GBR)	5	2	16	7	462	372	0–3	1–3	X	3–0	3–1	3–0	3–0	3–0
4	Jean-Michel Saive (BEL)	4	3	14	11	470	431	0–3	2–3	0–3	X	3–2	3–0	3–0	3–0
5	Jean-Philippe Gatien (FRA)	3	4	14	13	512	484	0–3	2–3	1–3	2–3	X	3–0	3–1	3–0
6	Sean O'Neill (USA)	2	5	6	16	332	424	0–3	0–3	0–3	0–3	0–3	X	3–2	3–0
7	Carlos Kawai Issamu (BRA)	1	6	5	18	368	456	0–3	0–3	0–3	0–3	1–3	2–3	X	3–0
8	Lotfi Joudi (TUN)	0	7	0	21	230	441	0–3	0–3	0–3	0–3	0–3	0–3	0–3	X

=== Group B ===
Rank	Athlete	W	L	GW	GL	PW	PL	SWE	CHN	FRG	FRA	TPE	INA	NZL	MRI
1	Jan-Ove Waldner (SWE)	7	0	21	2	465	327	X	3–2	3–0	3–0	3–0	3–0	3–0	3–0
2	Xu Zengcai (CHN)	6	1	20	3	460	290	2–3	X	3–0	3–0	3–0	3–0	3–0	3–0
3	Georg Böhm (FRG)	5	2	15	8	446	369	0–3	0–3	X	3–0	3–1	3–0	3–1	3–0
4	Patrick Birocheau (FRA)	3	4	11	14	422	436	0–3	0–3	0–3	X	3–1	3–1	2–3	3–0
5	Chih Chin-long (TPE)	3	4	11	12	407	417	0–3	0–3	1–3	1–3	X	3–0	3–0	3–0
6	Tonny Maringgi (INA)	2	5	7	17	363	469	0–3	0–3	0–3	1–3	0–3	X	3–2	3–0
7	Barry Griffiths (NZL)	2	5	9	18	452	522	0–3	0–3	1–3	3–2	0–3	2–3	X	3–1
8	Gilany Hosnani (MRI)	0	7	1	21	271	456	0–3	0–3	0–3	0–3	0–3	0–3	1–3	X

=== Group C ===
Rank	Athlete	W	L	GW	GL	PW	PL	AUT	CHN	HKG	TPE	HUN	NGR	IRQ	MRI
1	Ding Yi (AUT)	7	0	21	3	476	336	X	3–1	3–2	3–0	3–0	3–0	3–0	3–0
2	Chen Longcan (CHN)	6	1	19	6	495	366	1–3	X	3–2	3–0	3–0	3–1	3–0	3–0
3	Lo Chuen Tsung (HKG)	5	2	19	7	500	382	2–3	2–3	X	3–1	3–0	3–0	3–0	3–0
4	Wu Wen-chia (TPE)	3	4	11	12	417	391	0–3	0–3	1–3	X	1–3	3–0	3–0	3–0
5	Zsolt Harczi (HUN)	3	4	11	13	401	436	0–3	0–3	0–3	3–1	X	2–3	3–0	3–0
6	Yomi Bankole (NGR)	3	4	10	15	390	448	0–3	1–3	0–3	0–3	3–2	X	3–1	3–0
7	Abdul Wahab Ali (IRQ)	1	6	4	19	345	459	0–3	0–3	0–3	0–3	0–3	1–3	X	3–0
8	Alain Choo Choy (MRI)	0	7	1	21	252	458	0–3	0–3	0–3	0–3	0–3	0–3	0–3	X

=== Group D ===
Rank	Athlete	W	L	GW	GL	PW	PL	POL	YUG	FRG	JPN	NGR	AUS	IND	VEN
1	Andrzej Grubba (POL)	7	0	21	1	460	310	X	3–0	3–0	3–0	3–0	3–1	3–0	3–0
2	Zoran Primorac (YUG)	5	2	16	7	452	389	0–3	X	3–1	3–0	1–3	3–0	3–0	3–0
3	Jörg Roßkopf (FRG)	5	2	16	11	514	462	0–3	1–3	X	3–2	3–2	3–1	3–0	3–0
4	Yoshihito Miyazaki (JPN)	4	3	14	9	407	398	0–3	0–3	2–3	X	3–0	3–0	3–0	3–0
5	Atanda Musa (NGR)	4	3	14	12	484	473	0–3	3–1	2–3	0–3	X	3–1	3–1	3–0
6	Gary Haberl (AUS)	2	5	9	17	448	490	1–3	0–3	1–3	0–3	1–3	X	3–2	3–0
7	Sujay Ghorpade (IND)	1	6	6	20	383	515	0–3	0–3	0–3	0–3	1–3	2–3	X	3–2
8	Francisco López (VEN)	0	7	2	21	361	472	0–3	0–3	0–3	0–3	0–3	0–3	2–3	X

=== Group E ===
Rank	Athlete	W	L	GW	GL	PW	PL	KOR	SWE	JPN	IND	BUL	POL	CHI	EGY
1	Kim Ki-taik (KOR)	7	0	21	5	514	394	X	3–2	3–2	3–0	3–0	3–0	3–1	3–0
2	Jörgen Persson (SWE)	6	1	20	7	516	384	2–3	X	3–2	3–1	3–0	3–1	3–0	3–0
3	Kiyoshi Saito (JPN)	5	2	19	6	499	397	2–3	2–3	X	3–0	3–0	3–0	3–0	3–0
4	Kamlesh Mehta (IND)	4	3	13	12	470	457	0–3	1–3	0–3	X	3–1	3–1	3–0	3–1
5	Mariano Domuschiev (BUL)	3	4	10	15	425	473	0–3	0–3	0–3	1–3	X	3–0	3–2	3–1
6	Piotr Molenda (POL)	2	5	8	17	405	474	0–3	1–3	0–3	1–3	0–3	X	3–1	3–1
7	Jorge Gambra (CHI)	1	6	7	18	413	490	1–3	0–3	0–3	0–3	2–3	1–3	X	3–0
8	Sherif El-Saket (EGY)	0	7	3	21	324	497	0–3	0–3	0–3	1–3	1–3	1–3	0–3	X

=== Group F ===
Rank	Athlete	W	L	GW	GL	PW	PL	SWE	GBR	TPE	PAK	YUG	BRA	EGY	DOM
1	Erik Lindh (SWE)	7	0	21	7	558	414	X	3–0	3–2	3–1	3–2	3–1	3–0	3–1
2	Desmond Douglas (GBR)	6	1	18	5	451	350	0–3	X	3–1	3–0	3–0	3–1	3–0	3–0
3	Huang Huei-chieh (TPE)	5	2	18	7	469	388	2–3	1–3	X	3–0	3–1	3–0	3–0	3–0
4	Farjad Saif (PAK)	3	4	11	14	439	485	1–3	0 3	0–3	X	3–1	3–0	1–3	3–1
5	Zoran Kalinić (YUG)	3	4	13	14	503	493	2–3	0–3	1–3	1–3	X	3–2	3–0	3–0
6	Cláudio Kano (BRA)	2	5	10	16	452	488	1–3	1–3	0–3	0–3	2–3	X	3–1	3–0
7	Ashraf Helmy (EGY)	2	5	7	17	381	475	0–3	0–3	0–3	3–1	0–3	1–3	X	3–1
8	Raymundo Fermín (DOM)	0	7	3	21	331	491	1–3	0–3	0–3	1–3	0–3	0–3	1–3	X

=== Group G ===
Rank	Athlete	W	L	GW	GL	PW	PL	KOR	POL	TCH	GBR	HKG	CAN	DOM	TUN
1	Yoo Nam-kyu (KOR)	7	0	21	1	463	308	X	3–0	3–0	3–1	3–0	3–0	3–0	3–0
2	Leszek Kucharski (POL)	6	1	18	8	504	445	0–3	X	3–1	3–0	3–1	3–2	3–0	3–1
3	Jindřich Panský (TCH)	5	2	16	10	501	480	0–3	1–3	X	3–2	3–1	3–0	3–1	3–0
4	Carl Prean (GBR)	4	3	15	11	508	445	1–3	0–3	2–3	X	3–0	3–1	3–1	3–0
5	Vong Lu Veng (HKG)	3	4	11	16	496	524	0–3	1–3	1–3	0–3	X	3–2	3–2	3–0
6	Joe Ng (CAN)	2	5	11	15	481	500	0–3	2–3	0–3	1–3	2–3	X	3–0	3–0
7	Mario Álvarez (DOM)	1	6	7	18	404	487	0–3	0–3	1–3	1–3	2–3	0–3	X	3–0
8	Mourad Sta (TUN)	0	7	1	21	289	457	0–3	1–3	0–3	0–3	0–3	0–3	0–3	X

=== Group H ===
Rank	Athlete	W	L	GW	GL	PW	PL	YUG	JPN	HKG	KOR	URS	ITA	CHI	JAM
1	Ilija Lupulesku (YUG)	7	0	21	4	514	388	X	3–1	3–0	3–0	3–2	3–1	3–0	3–0
2	Seiji Ono (JPN)	5	2	18	11	557	515	1–3	X	3–2	3–1	2–3	3–2	3–0	3–0
3	Liu Fuk Man (HKG)	5	2	17	9	495	411	0–3	2–3	X	3–1	3–2	3–0	3–0	3–0
4	Kim Wan (KOR)	4	3	14	11	477	423	0–3	1–3	1–3	X	3–1	3–1	3–0	3–0
5	Andrei Mazunov (URS)	4	3	17	11	542	401	2–3	3–2	2–3	1–3	X	3–0	3–0	3–0
6	Massimo Costantini (ITA)	2	5	10	17	471	521	1–3	2–3	0–3	1–3	0–3	X	3–0	3–2
7	Marcos Núñez (CHI)	1	6	3	19	331	435	0–3	0–3	0–3	0–3	0–3	0–3	X	3–1
8	Garfield Jones (JAM)	0	7	3	21	293	486	0–3	0–3	0–3	0–3	0–3	2–3	1–3	X

== Knockout stage ==
First round
A1	Jiang Jialiang (CHN)	21	21	22	21
F2	Desmond Douglas (GBR)	18	18	24	13
H2	Seiji Ono (JPN)	22	17	16
F1	Erik Lindh (SWE)	24	21	21
G1	Yoo Nam-kyu (KOR)	21	21	21
D2	Zoran Primorac (YUG)	19	7	15
E2	Jörgen Persson (SWE)	21	21	19	21
D1	Andrzej Grubba (POL)	18	10	21	19
C1	Yi Ding (AUT)	6	14	21	11
A2	Tibor Klampár (HUN)	21	21	16	21
C2	Chen Longcan (CHN)	21	21	21
H1	Ilija Lupulesku (YUG)	13	18	11
E1	Kim Ki-taik (KOR)	17	19	21	21	21
B2	Xu Zengcai (CHN)	21	21	10	19	7
G2	Leszek Kucharski (POL)	23	20	21	17	14
B1	Jan-Ove Waldner (SWE)	21	22	17	21	21

Quarterfinals
A1	Jiang Jialiang (CHN)	21	12	13	20
F1	Erik Lindh (SWE)	16	21	21	22
G1	Yoo Nam-kyu (KOR)	19	21	21	21
E2	Jörgen Persson (SWE)	21	16	15	9
A2	Tibor Klampár (HUN)	21	7	11	21	21
C2	Chen Longcan (CHN)	19	21	21	19	19
E1	Kim Ki-taik (KOR)	17	21	20	21	21
B1	Jan-Ove Waldner (SWE)	21	17	22	17	18

Semifinals
F1	Erik Lindh (SWE)	10	22	9
G1	Yoo Nam-kyu (KOR)	21	24	21
A2	Tibor Klampár (HUN)	18	9	14
E1	Kim Ki-taik (KOR)	21	21	21

Gold medal match
G1	Yoo Nam-kyu (KOR)	17	21	21	23
E1	Kim Ki-taik (KOR)	21	19	11	21
Bronze medal match
F1	Erik Lindh (SWE)	14	21	21	21
A2	Tibor Klampár (HUN)	21	17	17	16
