= Tosi =

Tosi may refer to:

- Tosi (Nepal)

== People ==
- Adelaide Tosi (c. 1800–1859), Italian operatic soprano
- Alessandro Tosi (born 2001), Sammarinese footballer
- Anahi Tosi (born 1998), Argentine female volleyball player
- Arturo Tosi (1871–1956), Italian painter
- Christina Tosi (born 1981), chef and co-owner of Momofuku Milk Bar
- Eugenio Tosi (1864–1929), Italian Cardinal, archbishop of Milan
- Fausto Tosi (born 1962), Italian weightlifter
- Flavio Tosi (born 1969), Italian politician
- Flavio Tosi (American football) (1912–1994), American football end
- Franco Tosi (1850–1898), Italian engineer
- Giuseppe Felice Tosi (1619–c. 1693), Italian composer and organist
- Giuseppe Tosi (1916–1981), Italian athlete
- John Tosi (1913–2002), American football offensive lineman
- Laurence Tosi (born 1968), Founder/Managing Partner WestCap Group, former CFO Blackstone, Airbnb
- Luca Tosi (born 1992), San Marino international footballer
- Luigi Tosi (1915-2001), Italian actor
- Mao Tosi (born 1976), American former football player
- Marcelo Tosi (born 1969), Brazilian equestrian
- Mario Tosi (born 1942), Italian-American cinematographer and cameraman
- Noël Tosi (born 1959), French football coach
- Pascal Tosi (1837–1897), Italian Jesuit, missionary and co-founder of the Alaska mission
- Pascal Tosi (director), French director and writer
- Pasilio Tosi (born 1998), New Zealand rugby union player
- Pier Francesco Tosi (c. 1653–1732), Italian castrato singer and composer
- Piero Tosi (1927–2019), Italian costume designer
- Riccardo Tosi (born 1999), Italian footballer
- Rodrigo Tosi (born 1983), Brazilian footballer
- Victor B. Tosi (born 1937), member of the Bronx Republican Party
- Virgilio Tosi (1925–2023), Italian documentary filmmaker and film historian

== Other ==
- Franco Tosi Meccanica (FTM), Italian engineering business
- Cantieri navali Tosi di Taranto, "Tosi", an Italian shipbuilding company
- Tosi Agapi Pos Na Hathei, a 2002 album by Greek artist Natasa Theodoridou
