= Takehiro Watanabe =

Takehiro Watanabe may refer to:

- Takehiro Watanabe (skier) (渡部 剛弘, born 1993), Japanese Nordic combined skier
- Takehiro Watanabe (table tennis) (渡辺 武弘, born 1961), Japanese table tennis player
