= Sfakianakis (surname) =

Sfakianakis is a surname. Notable people with the surname include:

- Notis Sfakianakis, Greek singer
- Manolis Sfakianakis (born 1963), Greek police officer
- Ioannis Sfakianakis (1848–1924), Creatan politician
- Stelios Sfakianakis, Greek footballer
- Giannis Sfakianakis, Greek footballer
- Charalambos Sfakianakis (born 1963), Greek weightlifter
- Marielli Sfakianaki, Greek writer, singer, and composer

== See also ==
- Sfakianakis S.A.
