= Alain Côté (disambiguation) =

Alain Côté may refer to:

- Alain Côté (ice hockey, born 1957), left winger
- Alain Côté (ice hockey, born 1967), defence
- Alain Côté (fencer) (born 1963), Canadian Olympic fencer
