= Frank Pérez =

Dominican Republic weightlifter (born 1964)

Personal information
- Nationality: Dominican
- Born: 10 July 1964 (age 62)

Sport
- Sport: Weightlifting

Frank Pérez (born 10 July 1964) is a Dominican Republic weightlifter. He competed in the men's light heavyweight event at the 1988 Summer Olympics.
