= Absalom Shabangu =

Swazi weightlifter

Personal information
- Nationality: Swazi
- Born: 2 September 1952 (age 72)

Sport
- Sport: Weightlifting

Absalom Shabangu (born 2 September 1952) is a Swazi weightlifter. He competed in the men's light heavyweight event at the 1988 Summer Olympics.
