= Chan Chi Ming =

Hong Kong table tennis player

Personal information
- Nationality: Hong Konger
- Born: 28 May 1964 (age 60)

Sport
- Sport: Table tennis

Chan Chi Ming (born 28 May 1964) is a Hong Kong table tennis player. He competed in the men's doubles event at the 1988 Summer Olympics.
