= Piotr Molenda =

Polish table tennis player

Personal information
- Nationality: Polish
- Born: 3 March 1962 (age 63); Bielsko-Biała, Poland

Sport
- Sport: Table tennis

Piotr Molenda (born 3 March 1962) is a Polish table tennis player. He competed in the men's singles event at the 1988 Summer Olympics.
