= Rafael Elizondo =

Costa Rican weightlifter (born 1954)

Personal information
- Nationality: Costa Rican
- Born: 21 September 1954 (age 71)

Sport
- Sport: Weightlifting

Rafael Elizondo (born 21 September 1954) is a Costa Rican weightlifter. He competed in the men's light heavyweight event at the 1988 Summer Olympics.
