= Gottfried Bär =

Austrian table tennis player (born 1952)

Personal information
- Nationality: Austrian
- Born: 11 April 1952 (age 72)

Sport
- Sport: Table tennis

Gottfried Bär (born 11 April 1952) is an Austrian table tennis player. He competed in the men's doubles event at the 1988 Summer Olympics.
