= Mariano Lukov =

Bulgarian table tennis player

Personal information
- Full name: Mariano Lukov Domuschiev
- Born: 2 April 1958 (age 68) Stamboliyski, Plovdiv Province, Bulgaria
- Height: 1.78 m (5 ft 10 in)

Sport
- Sport: Table tennis

Mariano Lukov (Bulgarian: Мариано Луков) (born 2 April 1958) is a Bulgarian former table tennis player.

== Biography ==
He has been table tennis champion of Bulgaria on numerous occasions and also represented his country at the inaugural Olympics that featured the sport. Lukov's group stage record in Seoul was 3 wins and 4 losses, which did not allow him to advance to the knockout rounds. At the 1990 European Championships in Gothenburg Lukov finished in the top 16.

Following the end of his professional career, Lukov has been working as a player-coach and director of an international training center in Saint-Étienne.
