= Lee Hyung-keun =

South Korean weightlifter (born 1964)

Personal information
- Nationality: South Korean
- Born: 7 December 1964
- Died: 4 September 2022 (aged 57)

Sport
- Sport: Weightlifting

Lee Hyung-keun (7 December 1964 – 4 September 2022) was a South Korean weightlifter. He competed in the men's light heavyweight event at the 1988 Summer Olympics, winning the bronze medal.
