= Cheng Chia-tso =

Taiwanese weightlifter

Personal information
- Nationality: Taiwanese
- Born: 18 December 1962 (age 62)

Sport
- Sport: Weightlifting

Cheng Chia-tso (born 18 December 1962) is a Taiwanese weightlifter. He competed in the men's light heavyweight event at the 1988 Summer Olympics.
