= Weightlifting at the 1988 Summer Olympics – Men's 82.5 kg =

Weightlifting at the Olympics

Men's 82.5 kg at the Games of the XXIV Olympiad
- Venue: Olympic Weightlifting Gymnasium
- Date: 24 September 1988
- Competitors: 22 from 20 nations
- Winning total: 377.5 kg

Medalists
1st place, gold medalist(s)		Israil Arsamakov	Soviet Union
2nd place, silver medalist(s)		István Messzi	Hungary
3rd place, bronze medalist(s)		Lee Hyeong-geun	South Korea

The men's 82.5 kg weightlifting competitions at the 1988 Summer Olympics in Seoul took place on 24 September at the Olympic Weightlifting Gymnasium. It was the sixteenth appearance of the light heavyweight class.

== Results ==
Rank	Name	Country	kg
1	Israil Arsamakov	Soviet Union	377.5
2	István Messzi	Hungary	370.0
3	Lee Hyeong-geun	South Korea	367.5
4	Dave Morgan	Great Britain	365.0
5	Krzysztof Siemion	Poland	357.5
6	Ryoji Isaoka	Japan	350.0
7	Fausto Tosi	Italy	340.0
8	Ali Eroğlu	Turkey	330.0
9	Muyiwa Odusanya	Nigeria	320.0
10	Frank Pérez	Dominican Republic	317.5
11	Derrick Crass	United States	315.0
12	Cheng Chia-tso	Chinese Taipei	310.0
13	William Letriz	Puerto Rico	307.5
14	Curt White	United States	305.0
15	Jhon Sichel	Ecuador	282.5
16	Rafael Elizondo	Costa Rica	265.0
17	José Moirt	Mauritius	240.0
18	Lopesi Faagu	American Samoa	220.0
19	Percy Doherty	Sierra Leone	165.0
AC	Charalambos Sfakianakis	Greece	145.0
AC	László Barsi	Hungary	162.5
AC	Absalom Shabangu	Swaziland	DNF
