= Jhon Sichel =

Ecuadorian weightlifter

Personal information
- Nationality: Ecuadorian
- Born: 30 March 1967 (age 57)

Sport
- Sport: Weightlifting

Jhon Sichel (born 30 March 1967) is an Ecuadorian weightlifter. He competed in the men's light heavyweight event at the 1988 Summer Olympics.
