= Liu Fuk Man =

Hong Kong table tennis player

Personal information
- Nationality: Hong Konger
- Born: 11 October 1952 (age 72)

Sport
- Sport: Table tennis

Liu Fuk Man (born 11 October 1952) is a Hong Kong table tennis player. He competed in the men's singles and the men's doubles events at the 1988 Summer Olympics.
