= Jürgen Rebel =

German table tennis player

Personal information
- Nationality: German
- Born: 17 July 1963 (age 61); Darmstadt, Germany

Sport
- Sport: Table tennis

Jürgen Rebel (born 17 July 1963) is a German table tennis player. He competed in the men's doubles event at the 1988 Summer Olympics.
