= István Messzi =

Hungarian weightlifter

Personal information
- Born: 29 June 1961 Kiskunfélegyháza, Bács-Kiskun, Hungary
- Died: 9 May 1991 (aged 29) Tolna, Hungary
Medal record
Men's Weightlifting
Representing Hungary
Olympic Games
Silver medal – second place	1988 Seoul	82.5 Kg

István Messzi was a Hungarian weightlifter. He won a silver medal in the 82.5 kg class at the 1988 Summer Olympics in Seoul.
