= Sherif El-Saket =

Egyptian table tennis player

Personal information
- Nationality: Egyptian
- Born: 22 January 1970 (age 55)

Sport
- Sport: Table tennis

Sherif El-Saket (born 22 January 1970) is an Egyptian table tennis player. He competed in the men's singles event at the 1988 Summer Olympics.
