= Garfield Jones =

Jamaican table tennis player

Personal information
- Nationality: Jamaican
- Born: 4 March 1966 (age 59)

Sport
- Sport: Table tennis

Garfield Jones (born 4 March 1966) is a Jamaican table tennis player. He competed in the men's singles events at the 1988 Summer Olympics.
