= José Moirt =

Mauritian weightlifter

Personal information
- Nationality: Mauritian
- Born: 16 October 1965 (age 59)

Sport
- Sport: Weightlifting

José Moirt (born 16 October 1965) is a Mauritian weightlifter. He competed in the men's light heavyweight event at the 1988 Summer Olympics.
