= Yvan Waddell =

Canadian cyclist

Ivan Waddell
Personal information
- Born: 15 January 1964 (age 62) Port Moresby, Papua New Guinea

Cycling career
- Sport: Cycling

Yvan Waddell (born 15 January 1964) is a Canadian former cyclist. He competed at the 1988 Summer Olympics and the 1992 Summer Olympics.
