= Barry Griffiths (table tennis) =

New Zealand table tennis player

Personal information
- Nationality: New Zealand
- Born: 29 February 1964 (age 61); Auckland, New Zealand

Sport
- Sport: Table tennis

Barry Griffiths (born 29 February 1964) is a New Zealand table tennis player. He competed in the men's singles and the men's doubles events at the 1988 Summer Olympics. As of 2023, he has never lost an official competition match to either Simon Fenwick or Craig Dye although he has suffered significant soft tissue injuries while on tour with these players.
