= Janine Rankin =

Canadian gymnast

Personal information
- Born: 3 June 1972 (age 53) Weston, Ontario, Canada

Sport
- Sport: Gymnastics

Janine Rankin (born 3 June 1972) is a Canadian gymnast. She competed at the 1988 Summer Olympics and the 1992 Summer Olympics.

== Eponymous skill ==
Rankin has one balance beam mount named after her in the Code of Points.

Apparatus	Name	Description	Difficulty (Note: Valid for the 2025–2028 Code of Points)
Balance beam	Rankin	Jump or press on one arm to handstand lower	D (0.4)
