= Fausto Tosi =

Italian weightlifter

Personal information
- Nationality: Italian
- Born: 20 October 1962 (age 62); Verona, Italy

Sport
- Sport: Weightlifting

Fausto Tosi (born 20 October 1962) is an Italian weightlifter. He competed in the men's light heavyweight event at the 1988 Summer Olympics.
