= Mourad Tebourski =

Tunisian volleyball player (born 1962)

Personal information
- Nationality: Tunisian
- Born: 29 August 1962 (age 62)

Sport
- Sport: Volleyball

Mourad Tebourski (born 29 August 1962) is a Tunisian volleyball player. He competed in the men's tournament at the 1988 Summer Olympics.
