= Ian Bramall =

Canadian fencer

Personal information
- Born: 17 September 1964 (age 61) Vancouver, British Columbia, Canada

Sport
- Sport: Fencing

Ian Bramall (born 17 September 1964) is a Canadian fencer. He competed in the team épée event at the 1988 Summer Olympics.
