= Blanca Alejo =

Dominican Republic table tennis player

Personal information
- Full name: Blanca Iris Alejo Tejeda
- Nationality: Dominican
- Born: 16 March 1962 (age 63); Santo Domingo, Dominican Republic

Sport
- Country: Dominican Republic
- Sport: Table tennis

Blanca Iris Alejo Tejeda (born 16 March 1962) is a Dominican Republic table tennis player. She competed at the 1988 Summer Olympics and the 1996 Summer Olympics.
