= Hichem Ben Amira =

Tunisian volleyball player (born 1968)

Personal information
- Nationality: Tunisian
- Born: 20 April 1968 (age 56)

Sport
- Sport: Volleyball

Hichem Ben Amira (born 20 April 1968) is a Tunisian volleyball player. He competed in the men's tournament at the 1988 Summer Olympics.
