= Tosi (Nepal) =

Tosi तोसी
- Village development committee
- Location in Nepal
- Coordinates: 28.99°N 81.37°E
- Country: Nepal
- Zone: Seti Zone
- District: Achham District

Population (2001)
  - Total: 2,015
  - Religions: Hindu
- Time zone: UTC+5:45 (Nepal Time)

Tosi is a village in Achham District in the Seti Zone of western Nepal. At the time of the 1991 Nepal census, the village had a population of 1962 living in 355 houses. At the time of the 2001 Nepal census, the population was 2015, of whom 33% were literate.
