= Lotfi Joudi =

Tunisian table tennis player

Personal information
- Nationality: Tunisian
- Born: 11 August 1963 (age 61)

Sport
- Sport: Table tennis

Lotfi Joudi (born 11 August 1963) is a Tunisian table tennis player. He competed in the men's singles event at the 1988 Summer Olympics.
