= Michael Muller (field hockey) =

Canadian field hockey player

Medal record

Men's field hockey

Representing Canada

Pan American Games
Silver medal – second place	1991 Havana	Team

Michael Muller (born 26 November 1965 in Delta, British Columbia) is a Canadian former field hockey player who competed in the 1988 Summer Olympics.
