= Sofiane Ben Letaief =

Tunisian table tennis player

Personal information
- Nationality: Tunisian
- Born: 19 October 1966 (age 58)

Sport
- Sport: Table tennis

Sofiane Ben Letaief (born 19 October 1966) is a Tunisian table tennis player. He competed in the men's doubles event at the 1988 Summer Olympics.
