= Charalambos Sfakianakis =

Greek weightlifter (born 1963)

Personal information
- Nationality: Greek
- Born: 23 May 1963 (age 61)

Sport
- Sport: Weightlifting

Charalambos Sfakianakis (Greek: Χαράλαμπος Σφακιανάκης; born 23 May 1963) is a Greek weightlifter. He competed in the men's light heavyweight event at the 1988 Summer Olympics.
