= Gary Haberl =

Australian table tennis player (1965–2019)

Personal information
- Nationality: Australian
- Born: 4 July 1965
- Died: 18 November 2019 (aged 54); Cessnock, New South Wales, Australia

Sport
- Sport: Table tennis

Gary Haberl (4 July 1965 – 18 November 2019) was an Australian table tennis player. He competed in the men's singles event at the 1988 Summer Olympics, and was a ten-time national champion.
