= Borys Rozenberh =

Ukrainian table tennis player

Personal information
- Nationality: Ukrainian
- Born: 9 July 1962 (age 63)

Sport
- Sport: Table tennis
Medal record
European Championships
Representing Soviet Union
| Bronze medal – third place | 1988 Paris | Team |

Borys Rozenberh (born 9 July 1962) is a former Ukrainian table tennis player. He competed in the men's doubles event at the 1988 Summer Olympics. At the European Championship in 1988, as part of the USSR men's national team (Andrei Mazunov, Dmitry Mazunov, Borys Rozenberh, Volodymyr Dvorak, Evgeni Brainin), Rosenberh won a bronze medal in the team competition.
