= Alain Côté (fencer) =

Canadian fencer (born 1963)

Personal information
- Born: 22 September 1963 (age 62) Saint-Jérôme, Quebec, Canada

Sport
- Sport: Fencing

Alain Côté (born 22 September 1963) is a Canadian fencer. He competed at the 1984, 1988 and 1992 Summer Olympics.
