= Zsolt-Georg Böhm =

German table tennis player

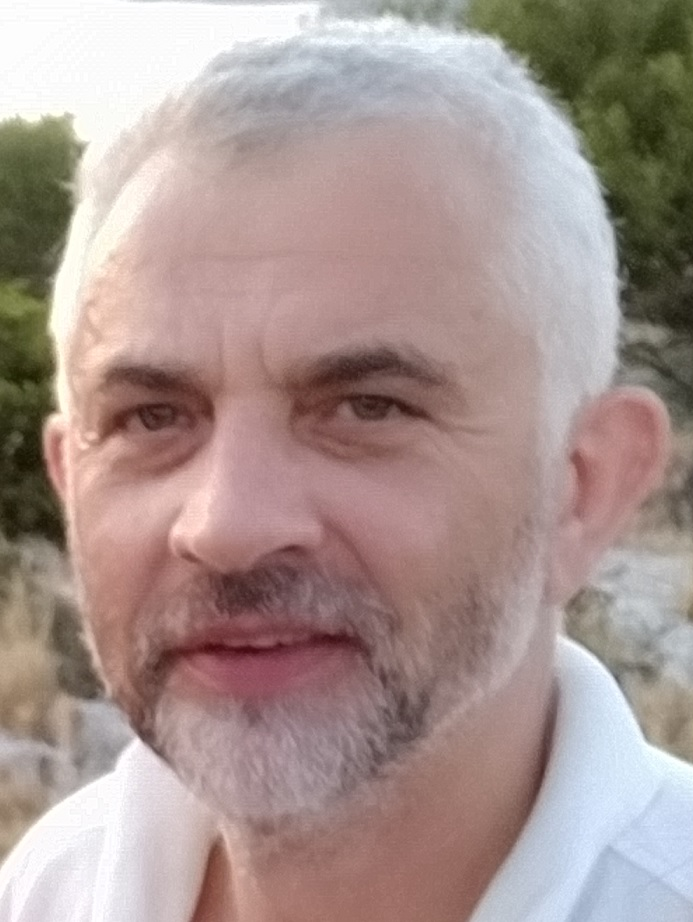

Personal information
- Native name: Böhm Zsolt György
- Nationality: Hungarian, German
- Born: 17 April 1962 (age 64) Sălacea, Romania
- Spouse: Zsuzsanna Böhm

Sport
- Sport: Table tennis

Zsolt-Georg Böhm (born 17 April 1962) is a Hungarian table tennis player, writer, teacher and computer scientist.

== Early years ==
Zsolt György Böhm was born in Szalacs, in the northern part of Bihor County, in present Romania. Both parents were doctors.

His father, whose ancestors emigrated from Swabia to Hungary in 1735, played table tennis in the Romanian 1st league.

Böhm attended Hungarian-language schools. He started playing table tennis competitively at the age of seven under his father's guidance. As a teenager, he moved to Cluj Napoca with his brother József Böhm, also a table tennis player, who is two years older than him, and became a disciple of Farkas Paneth.

Böhm won a total of 25 table tennis titles in Romania. In 1978, he won the European Youth Championships in the doubles and mixed competition as well the Romanian Championships in the men's single competition, in which he defeated his brother. With him Böhm topped the podium in doubles. In 1979, he became national champion again. At the 1979 World Championships in Pyongyang, he defeated the Hungarian world champion, Gábor Gergely.

== New beginning in Germany ==
After the 1980 European Table Tennis Championships in Bern, Böhm fled to Germany, where he moved to Mörfelden-Walldorf, near Frankfurt am Main.

Böhm became the best player of the decade on German national scale, winning 6 titles in the men single competition alone. For many years, he belonged to the top-ranked players in the world. With his brother he became national champion in doubles in 1984. He beat the Hungarian István Jónyer and Tibor Klampár. In 1988 he participated in the XXIV Summer Olympics in Seoul. He won the silver medal with the German national team at the 1990 European Championships in Gothenburg. In the final of the team competition he defeated Jan-Ove Waldner. Between 1982 and 1993 he played in 102 international matches for Germany.

== The author ==
In 2013, his autobiography Mein Wunder von Bern was published. In 2018, Böhm wrote his novel Die Pontifex-Botschaft which is accompanied by two book trailer in German and English. In 2021, a sequel to his autobiography, Offene Veränderung, has been published.

== Outstanding achievements ==
=== Outstanding individual achievements ===
==== World Cup ====
- – 1989 Kenya: 5th place

==== European TOP-12 ====
- – 1988 Yugoslavia: 10th place
- – 1999 Belgium: 5th place

==== International Championships ====
- – 1977 Spain: 3rd place
- – 1979 Bulgaria: 3rd place
- – 1980 Guernsey: 1st place
- – 1982 Korea: 3rd place
- – 1984 England: 3rd place
- – 1988 France: 3rd place
- – 1988 Germany: 3rd place

==== Balkan Championships ====
- – 1979 Greece: 1st place

==== European Veterans Championships ====
- – 2013 Germany: 3rd place

==== World Veterans Championships ====
- – 2023 Oman: 1st place

=== Outstanding team results ===
- – 1986 European Champions Cup: 1st place with ATSV Saarbrücken
- – 1987 European Champion Teams Cup: 1st place with TTC Zugbrücke Grenzau
- – 1988 European Champions Cup 1st place with TTC Zugbrücke Grenzau
- – 1990 European Championships, Sweden: 2nd place with the German team
- – 1992 European Championship, Germany 3rd place with the German team

== Bibliography ==
- – Mein Wunder von Bern. Schiller Verlag. Bonn, Hermannstadt. 2013. ISBN 978-3-946954-91-0
- – Die Pontifex-Botschaft. Musketier Verlag Bremen. 2018. ISBN 978-3-946635-09-3
- – Offene Veränderung. Schiller Verlag. Bonn, Hermannstadt. 2021. ISBN 978-3-946954-97-2

== Resources ==
- – Rahul Nelson Georg und Josef Böhm: Ein Brüderpaar auf Erfolgskurs, Zeitschrift, DTS, 1986/2, pages 32
- – Dübbel, Johannes (1994). Profile. Gespräche mit Zeitgenossen. Christliches Verlagshaus, p. 51-56 ISBN 3-7675-3485-1
- – Landessportbund Rheinland-Pfalz (1997). Auslese. Die bekanntesten Sportler aus Rheinland-Pfalz, Sport und Medien Rheinland-Pfalz GmbH, p. 18
- – Schössler, Hans-Peter (2018). Keine halben Sachen, TTC Zugbrücke e.V., p. 118-121
- – Erich Philippi: Georg und Josef Böhm, das Brüderpaar Nummer 1 im DTTB – Viel gemeinsam und doch verschieden, DTS Newsletter, 1983/2, p. 31
- – Székelyhon hírlap, 2019/3/19, p. 8
- – Karlsruher Virtueller Katalog
- – Katalog der Deutschen Nationalbibliothek
- - Budapester Zeitung, 2013/30, 9-page
