= Abdul Wahab Ali =

Iraqi table tennis player

Personal information
- Nationality: Iraqi
- Born: 7 July 1958 (age 67)

Sport
- Sport: Table tennis

Abdul Wahab Ali (born 7 July 1958) is an Iraqi table tennis player. He competed in the men's singles event at the 1988 Summer Olympics.
