= Zsolt Harczi =

Hungarian table tennis player

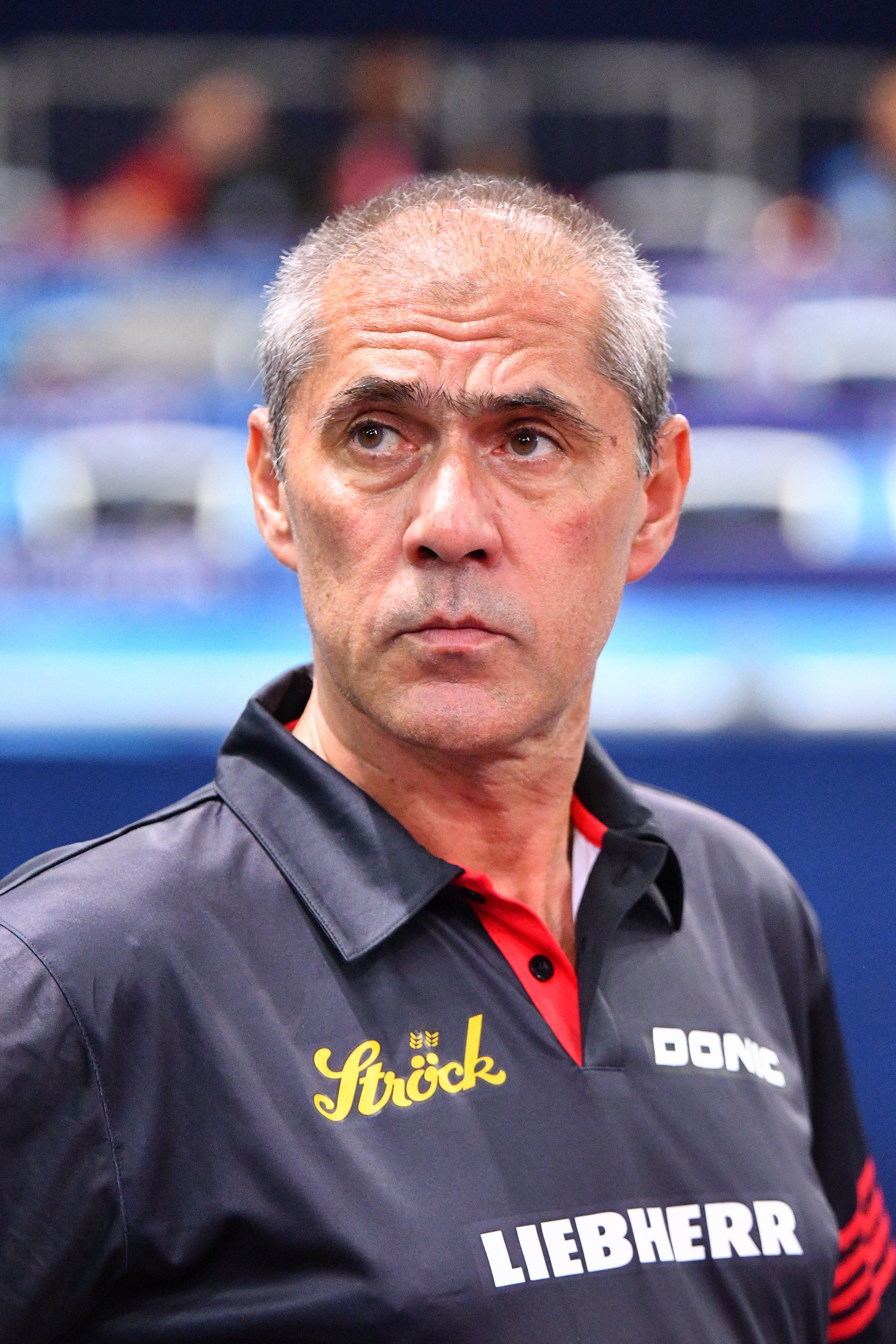

Personal information
- Nationality: Hungarian
- Born: 17 February 1967 (age 58); Cegléd, Hungary

Sport
- Sport: Table tennis

Zsolt Harczi (born 17 February 1967) is a Hungarian table tennis player. He competed in the men's singles event at the 1988 Summer Olympics.
