= Vong Lu Veng =

Hong Kong table tennis player

Personal information
- Nationality: Hong Konger
- Born: 12 March 1950 (age 75)

Sport
- Sport: Table tennis

Vong Lu Veng (born 12 March 1950) is a Hong Kong table tennis player. He competed in the men's singles and the men's doubles events at the 1988 Summer Olympics.
