= Takehiro Watanabe (table tennis) =

Japanese table tennis player

Personal information
- Nationality: Japanese
- Born: 16 December 1961 (age 63)

Sport
- Sport: Table tennis

Takehiro Watanabe (渡辺 武弘, Watanabe Takehiro, born 16 December 1961) is a Japanese table tennis player. He competed at the 1988 Summer Olympics and the 1992 Summer Olympics.
