= Huang Huei-chieh =

Taiwanese table tennis player

Personal information
- Nationality: Taiwanese
- Born: 2 July 1965 (age 59)

Sport
- Sport: Table tennis

Huang Huei-chieh (born 2 July 1965) is a Taiwanese table tennis player. He competed in the men's singles and the men's doubles events at the 1988 Summer Olympics.
