= Titus Omotara =

Nigerian table tennis player

Personal information
- Nationality: Nigerian

Sport
- Sport: Table tennis

Titus Omotara is a Nigerian table tennis player. He competed in the men's doubles event at the 1988 Summer Olympics.
