= Alain Choo Choy =

Mauritian table tennis player

Personal information
- Nationality: Mauritian
- Born: 28 October 1968 (age 56)

Sport
- Sport: Table tennis

Alain Choo Choy (born 28 October 1968) is a Mauritian table tennis player. He competed in the men's singles and the men's doubles events at the 1988 Summer Olympics.
