= Gilany Hosnani =

Mauritian table tennis player

Personal information
- Nationality: Mauritian
- Born: 21 August 1957 (age 67)

Sport
- Sport: Table tennis

Gilany Hosnani (born 21 August 1957) is a Mauritian table tennis player. He competed in the men's singles and the men's doubles events at the 1988 Summer Olympics.
