= Mourad Sta =

Tunisian table tennis player

Personal information
- Nationality: Tunisian
- Born: 9 April 1967 (age 57)

Sport
- Sport: Table tennis

Mourad Sta (born 9 April 1967) is a Tunisian table tennis player. He competed at the 1988 Summer Olympics and the 1992 Summer Olympics.
