= Yomi Bankole =

Nigerian table tennis player

Personal information
- Nationality: Nigerian
- Born: 7 January 1960
- Died: 29 January 2012 (aged 52) Lagos, Nigeria

Sport
- Sport: Table tennis

Oluwayomi Bankole Wiekliffe, also known by his nickname Hawk (7 January 1960 – 29 January 2012) was a Nigerian table tennis player. He competed at the 1988 Summer Olympics and the 1992 Summer Olympics. He also placed second in the 1984 Asoju Oba Tournament, won two African Championships, and won the 2008 Odumbaku Cup.

In 2004, Bankole was convicted of armed robbery and spent four years in prison. He died on January 29, 2012 at the age of 52.
