= Xu Zengcai =

Chinese table tennis player

Xu Zengcai (Chinese: 许增才, born 1 October 1961) is a male Chinese former table tennis player who played at the 1988 Summer Olympics.

He is married to former teammate Chen Zihe.
