= Andrei Mazunov =

Russian table tennis player

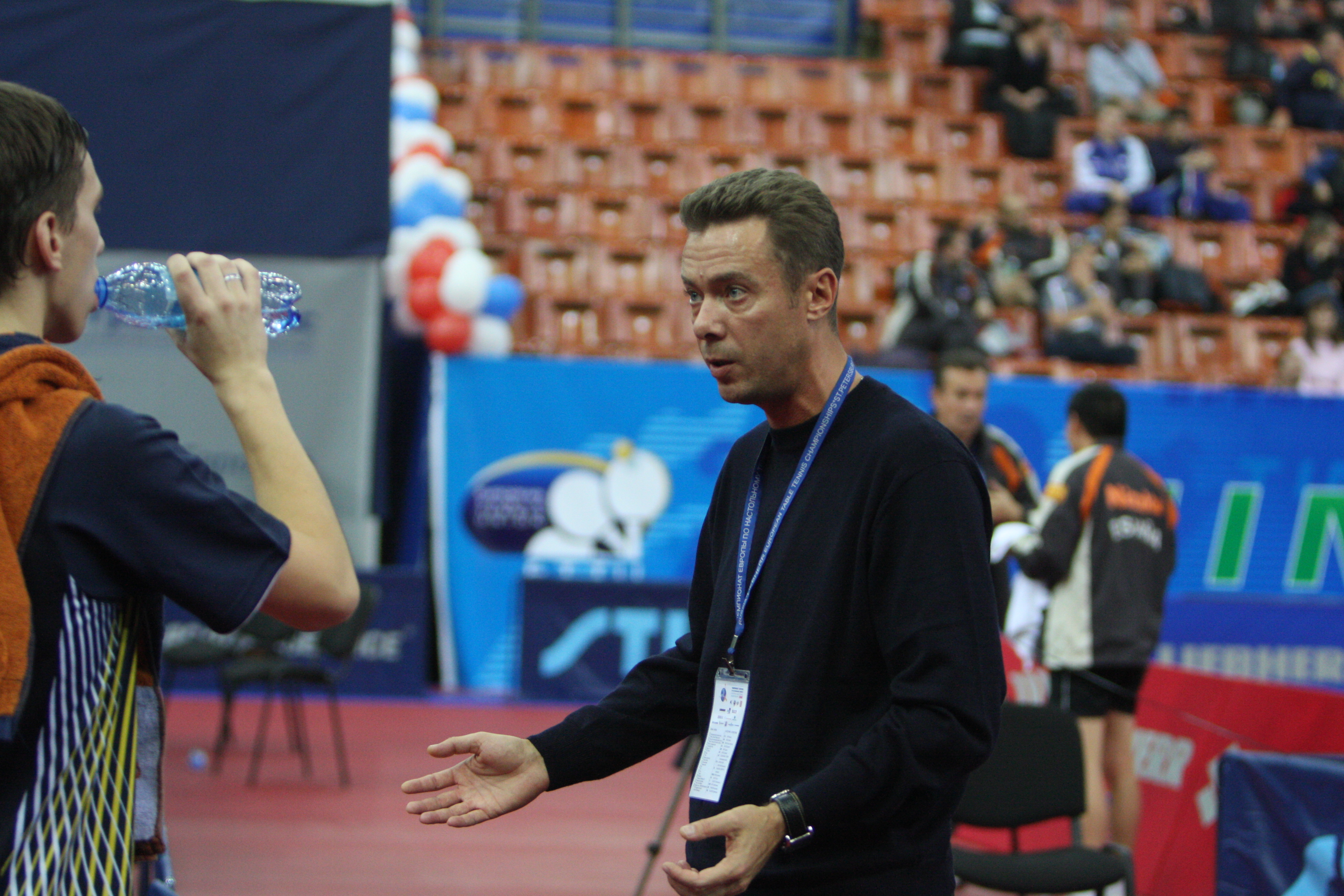

Personal information
- Nationality: Russia
- Born: 31 March 1967 (age 59)
Medal record
World Table Tennis Championships
Representing Soviet Union
Bronze medal – third place	1991	Doubles
World Cup
Representing Russia
Silver medal – second place	1992 Las Vegas	Doubles
European Championships
Representing Soviet Union
Bronze medal – third place	1984 Moscow	Singles
Silver medal – second place	1988 Paris	Singles
Bronze medal – third place	1988 Paris	Team
Bronze medal – third place	1990 Gothenburg	Doubles

Andrei Mazunov (born 31 March 1967) is a male Russian former international table tennis player.

He won a bronze medal at the 1991 World Table Tennis Championships in the men's doubles with his brother Dmitry Mazunov.

== See also ==
- List of table tennis players
