= Fencing at the 1988 Summer Olympics – Men's foil =

Fencing at the Olympics

Men's foil at the Games of the XXIV Olympiad
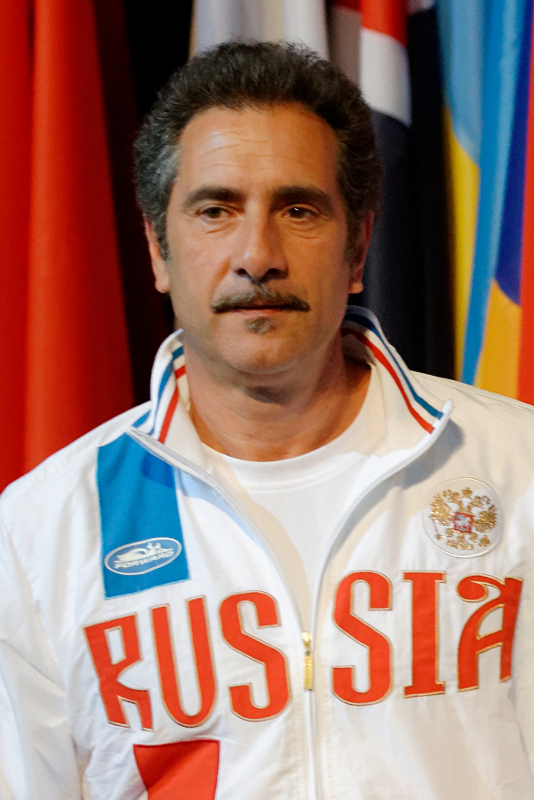
- Stefano Cerioni (2014, as coach of Russia national team)
- Venue: Olympic Fencing Gymnasium
- Dates: 20–21 September 1988
- Competitors: 68 from 29 nations

Medalists
1st place, gold medalist(s)		Stefano Cerioni	Italy
2nd place, silver medalist(s)		Udo Wagner	East Germany
3rd place, bronze medalist(s)		Aleksandr Romankov	Soviet Union

The men's foil was one of eight fencing events on the fencing at the 1988 Summer Olympics programme. It was the twentieth appearance of the event. The competition was held from 20 to 21 September 1988. 68 fencers from 29 nations competed. Nations had been limited to three fencers each since 1928. The event was won by Stefano Cerioni of Italy, the nation's second consecutive and seventh overall (matching France for most all-time) victory in the men's foil. Cerioni was the ninth man to win multiple medals in the event. Udo Wagner earned East Germany's first medal in the event with his silver, while Aleksandr Romankov's bronze put the Soviet Union back on the podium after a one-Games absence caused by the boycott. Romankov also became the third man to win three medals in the event.

== Background ==
This was the 20th appearance of the event, which has been held at every Summer Olympics except 1908 (when there was a foil display only rather than a medal event). Seven of the eight quarter-finalists from 1984 returned: gold medalist Mauro Numa of Italy, silver medalist Matthias Behr of West Germany, bronze medalist Stefano Cerioni of Italy, and quarterfinal losers Thierry Soumagne of Belgium, Andrea Borella of Italy, Matthias Gey of West Germany, and Philippe Omnès of France. Also returning was Alexandr Romankov of the Soviet Union, who had won silver in 1976 and bronze in 1980 but had not competed in 1984 due to the boycott. Numa, Borella, and Gey had won the three world championships since the 1984 Games; Romankov had won 6 world championships but none since 1983.

Aruba and Indonesia each made their debut in the men's foil. France and the United States each made their 18th appearance, tied for most of any nation; France had missed only the 1904 (with fencers not traveling to St. Louis) and the 1912 (boycotted due to a dispute over rules) foil competitions, while the United States had missed the inaugural 1896 competition and boycotted the 1980 Games altogether.

== Competition format ==
The 1988 tournament used a three-phase format very similar to that of 1984, though the second phase (double elimination) round expanded from 16 to 32 fencers.

The first phase was a multi-round round-robin pool play format; each fencer in a pool faced each other fencer in that pool once. There were three pool rounds:

- The first round had 12 pools of 5 or 6 fencers each, with the top 4 in each pool advancing.
- The second round had 8 pools of 6 fencers each, with the top 5 in each pool advancing.
- The third round had 8 pools of 5 fencers each, with the top 4 in each pool advancing.

The second phase was a truncated double-elimination tournament. Four fencers advanced to the final round through the winners brackets and four more advanced via the repechage.

The final phase was a single elimination tournament with a bronze medal match.

Bouts in the round-robin pools were to 5 touches; bouts in the double-elimination and final rounds were to 10 touches.

== Schedule ==
All times are Korea Standard Time adjusted for daylight savings (UTC+10)

Date	Time	Round
Tuesday, 20 September 1988	8:30; 13:00; 15:00	Round 1 Round 2 Round 3
Wednesday, 21 September 1988	14:00	Double elimination round Quarterfinals; Semifinals; Bronze medal match Final

== Results ==
=== Round 1 ===
==== Round 1 Pool A ====
Pos	Fencer	W	L	TF	TA	Qual.	MG	AMEH	ES	ST	DF
1	Matthias Gey (FRG)	3	1	19	10	Q		5–3	4–5	5–1	5–1
2	Abdel Monem El-Husseini (EGY)	3	1	18	11	Q	3–5		5–1	5–3	5–2
3	Eric Strand (SWE)	3	1	16	13	Q	5–4	1–5		5–0	5–4
4	Sergio Turiace (ARG)	1	3	9	19	Q	1–5	3–5	0–5		5–4
5	Douglas Fonseca (BRA)	0	4	11	20		1–5	2–5	4–5	4–5	

Source: Official Report, vol. 2, p. 372

==== Round 1 Pool B ====
Pos	Fencer	W	L	TF	TA	Qual.	MB	IM	OK	AE	KAA
1	Matthias Behr (FRG)	3	1	19	9	Q		5–0	4–5	5–1	5–3
2	Ilgar Mamedov (URS)	3	1	15	7	Q	0–5		5–1	5–0	5–1
3	Ola Kajbjer (SWE)	3	1	16	14	Q	5–4	1–5		5–4	5–1
4	Aris Enkelmann (GDR)	1	3	10	15	Q	1–5	0–5	4–5		5–0
5	Khaled Al-Awadhi (KUW)	0	4	5	20		3–5	1–5	1–5	0–5	

Source: Official Report, vol. 2, p. 372

==== Round 1 Pool C ====
Pos	Fencer	W	L	TF	TA	Qual.	SC	GNC	PH	LB	SAS
1	Stefano Cerioni (ITA)	4	0	20	12	Q		5–3	5–4	5–3	5–2
2	Go Nak-Chun (KOR)	3	1	18	14	Q	3–5		5–3	5–4	5–2
3	Pierre Harper (GBR)	2	2	17	13	Q	4–5	3–5		5–2	5–1
4	Leszek Bandach (POL)	1	3	14	16	Q	3–5	4–5	2–5		5–1
5	Saqer Al-Surayei (KUW)	0	4	6	20		2–5	2–5	1–5	1–5	

Source: Official Report, vol. 2, p. 372

==== Round 1 Pool D ====
Pos	Fencer	W	L	TF	TA	Qual.	US	ZE	PL	KU	TA
1	Ulrich Schreck (FRG)	4	0	20	10	Q		5–3	5–1	5–4	5–2
2	Zsolt Érsek (HUN)	3	1	18	9	Q	3–5		5–1	5–2	5–1
3	Peter Lewison (USA)	2	2	12	17	Q	1–5	1–5		5–3	5–4
4	Kenichi Umezawa (JPN)	1	3	14	19	Q	4–5	2–5	3–5		5–4
5	Thomas Åkerberg (SWE)	0	4	11	20		2–5	1–5	4–5	4–5	

Source: Official Report, vol. 2, p. 372

==== Round 1 Pool E ====
Pos	Fencer	W	L	TF	TA	Qual.	MN	JH	MM	AM	KYG	PC
1	Mauro Numa (ITA)	4	1	24	14	Q		5–3	4–5	5–3	5–3	5–0
2	Jens Howe (GDR)	4	1	23	15	Q	3–5		5–3	5–2	5–1	5–4
3	Mike Marx (USA)	3	2	19	17	Q	5–4	3–5		1–5	5–3	5–0
4	Ahmed Mohamed (EGY)	2	3	19	16	Q	3–5	2–5	5–1		4–5	5–0
5	Kim Yong-Guk (KOR)	2	3	17	20		3–5	1–5	3–5	5–4		5–1
6	Pedro Cornet (PAR)	0	5	5	25		0–5	4–5	0–5	0–5	1–5	

Source: Official Report, vol. 2, p. 372

==== Round 1 Pool F ====
Pos	Fencer	W	L	TF	TA	Qual.	BZ	JW	LY	RD	CKS	AT
1	Bogusław Zych (POL)	4	1	24	10	Q		4–5	5–2	5–2	5–1	5–0
2	Joachim Wendt (AUT)	3	2	20	16	Q	5–4		5–2	3–5	5–0	2–5
3	Liu Yunhong (CHN)	3	2	19	16	Q	2–5	2–5		5–4	5–2	5–0
4	Robert Davidson (AUS)	3	2	21	20	Q	2–5	5–3	4–5		5–4	5–3
5	Choy Kam Shing (HKG)	1	4	12	21		1–5	0–5	2–5	4–5		5–1
6	Austin Thomas (ARU)	1	4	9	22		0–5	5–2	0–5	3–5	1–5	

Source: Official Report, vol. 2, p. 372

==== Round 1 Pool G ====
Pos	Fencer	W	L	TF	TA	Qual.	AR	BG	JE	DL	RL	A
1	Aleksandr Romankov (URS)	5	0	25	10	Q		5–2	5–3	5–2	5–3	5–0
2	Bill Gosbee (GBR)	4	1	22	11	Q	2–5		5–3	5–2	5–1	5–0
3	Jesús Esperanza (ESP)	3	2	21	17	Q	3–5	3–5		5–3	5–2	5–2
4	Dave Littell (USA)	2	3	17	16	Q	2–5	2–5	3–5		5–0	5–1
5	Roberto Lazzarini (BRA)	1	4	11	21		3–5	1–5	2–5	0–5		5–1
6	Alkindi (INA)	0	5	4	25		0–5	0–5	2–5	1–5	1–5	

Source: Official Report, vol. 2, p. 372

==== Round 1 Pool H ====
Pos	Fencer	W	L	TF	TA	Qual.	PO	RG	AG	YK	AR	SM
1	Philippe Omnès (FRA)	4	1	22	10	Q		2–5	5–1	5–0	5–1	5–3
2	Róbert Gátai (HUN)	4	1	24	12	Q	5–2		5–4	4–5	5–0	5–1
3	Andrés García (ESP)	3	2	20	16	Q	1–5	4–5		5–2	5–4	5–0
4	Yoshihiko Kanatsu (JPN)	3	2	17	17	Q	0–5	5–4	2–5		5–1	5–2
5	Anatol Richter (AUT)	1	4	11	22		1–5	0–5	4–5	1–5		5–2
6	Salman Mohamed (KUW)	0	5	8	25		3–5	1–5	0–5	2–5	2–5	

Source: Official Report, vol. 2, p. 372

==== Round 1 Pool I ====
Pos	Fencer	W	L	TF	TA	Qual.	BK	DM	PS	KSP	AM	YWS
1	Boris Koretsky (URS)	4	1	23	10	Q		5–2	3–5	5–0	5–1	5–2
2	Donnie McKenzie (GBR)	4	1	22	11	Q	2–5		5–2	5–2	5–2	5–0
3	Pál Szekeres (HUN)	3	2	21	17	Q	5–3	2–5		5–3	4–5	5–1
4	Kim Seung-Pyo (KOR)	2	3	15	18	Q	0–5	2–5	3–5		5–1	5–2
5	Antônio Machado (BRA)	2	3	14	23		1–5	2–5	5–4	1–5		5–4
6	Yan Wing-Shean (TPE)	0	5	9	25		2–5	0–5	1–5	2–5	4–5	

Source: Official Report, vol. 2, p. 372

==== Round 1 Pool J ====
Pos	Fencer	W	L	TF	TA	Qual.	LB	ZZ	DM	UW	MY	WTF
1	Laurent Bel (FRA)	4	1	24	12	Q		5–1	4–5	5–4	5–1	5–1
2	Zhang Zhicheng (CHN)	4	1	21	13	Q	1–5		5–0	5–4	5–2	5–2
3	Benoît Giasson (CAN)	4	1	20	18	Q	5–4	0–5		5–2	5–4	5–3
4	Udo Wagner (GDR)	2	3	20	17	Q	4–5	4–5	2–5		5–1	5–1
5	Michel Youssef (LIB)	1	4	13	21		1–5	2–5	4–5	1–5		5–1
6	Weng Tak Fung (HKG)	0	5	8	25		1–5	2–5	3–5	1–5	1–5	

Source: Official Report, vol. 2, p. 372

==== Round 1 Pool K ====
Pos	Fencer	W	L	TF	TA	Qual.	PG	MS	KE	LR	WST	ZEK
1	Patrick Groc (FRA)	4	1	21	11	Q		1–5	5–3	5–1	5–2	5–0
2	Marian Sypniewski (POL)	3	2	21	11	Q	5–1		3–5	3–5	5–0	5–0
3	Koji Emura (JPN)	3	2	21	16	Q	3–5	5–3		5–3	3–5	5–0
4	Luc Rocheleau (CAN)	3	2	19	15	Q	1–5	5–3	3–5		5–1	5–1
5	Wang San-Tsai (TPE)	2	3	13	19		2–5	0–5	5–3	1–5		5–1
6	Zahi El-Khoury (LIB)	0	5	2	25		0–5	0–5	0–5	1–5	1–5	

Source: Official Report, vol. 2, p. 372

==== Round 1 Pool L ====
Pos	Fencer	W	L	TF	TA	Qual.	AB	LS	TS	SA	JB	LCM
1	Andrea Borella (ITA)	5	0	25	12	Q		5–3	5–3	5–3	5–2	5–1
2	Lao Shaopei (CHN)	4	1	23	11	Q	3–5		5–1	5–0	5–2	5–3
3	Thierry Soumagne (BEL)	3	2	19	15	Q	3–5	1–5		5–4	5–1	5–0
4	Stephen Angers (CAN)	1	4	15	21	Q	3–5	0–5	4–5		5–1	3–5
5	José Bandeira (POR)	1	4	11	22		2–5	2–5	1–5	1–5		5–2
6	Lee Chung Man (HKG)	1	4	11	23		1–5	3–5	0–5	5–3	2–5	

Source: Official Report, vol. 2, p. 372

=== Round 2 ===
==== Round 2 Pool A ====
Pos	Fencer	W	L	TF	TA	Qual.	AR	PS	JH	JE	BG	SA
1	Aleksandr Romankov (URS)	4	1	20	16	Q		5–4	5–4	0–5	5–3	5–0
2	Pál Szekeres (HUN)	3	2	23	17	Q	4–5		4–5	5–3	5–1	5–3
3	Jens Howe (GDR)	3	2	22	17	Q	4–5	5–4		5–0	3–5	5–3
4	Jesús Esperanza (ESP)	3	2	18	14	Q	5–0	3–5	0–5		5–4	5–0
5	Benoît Giasson (CAN)	2	3	18	22	Q	3–5	1–5	5–3	4–5		5–4
6	Stephen Angers (CAN)	0	5	10	25		0–5	3–5	3–5	0–5	4–5	

Source: Official Report, vol. 2, p. 373

==== Round 2 Pool A ====
Pos	Fencer	W	L	TF	TA	Qual.	SC	MG	PG	AE	TS	RD
1	Stefano Cerioni (ITA)	4	1	24	11	Q		5–2	5–2	5–1	4–5	5–1
2	Matthias Gey (FRG)	3	2	21	19	Q	2–5		5–3	4–5	5–4	5–2
3	Patrick Groc (FRA)	3	2	20	19	Q	2–5	3–5		5–4	5–3	5–2
4	Aris Enkelmann (GDR)	2	3	18	20	Q	1–5	5–4	4–5		3–5	5–1
5	Thierry Soumagne (BEL)	2	3	20	22	Q	5–4	4–5	3–5	5–3		3–5
6	Robert Davidson (AUS)	1	4	11	23		1–5	2–5	2–5	1–5	5–3	

Source: Official Report, vol. 2, p. 373

==== Round 2 Pool B ====
Pos	Fencer	W	L	TF	TA	Qual.	ZZ	MM	ST	AG	MB	AB
1	Zhang Zhicheng (CHN)	4	1	20	16	Q		5–2	0–5	5–3	5–4	5–2
2	Mike Marx (USA)	3	2	19	16	Q	2–5		5–2	5–1	5–3	2–5
3	Sergio Turiace (ARG)	2	3	18	16	Q	5–0	2–5		4–5	5–1	2–5
4	Andrés García (ESP)	2	3	17	19	Q	3–5	1–5	5–4		3–5	5–0
5	Matthias Behr (FRG)	2	3	18	21	Q	4–5	3–5	1–5	5–3		5–3
6	Andrea Borella (ITA)	2	3	15	19		2–5	5–2	5–2	0–5	3–5	

Source: Official Report, vol. 2, p. 373

==== Round 2 Pool C ====
Pos	Fencer	W	L	TF	TA	Qual.	ZE	US	MN	JW	LY	KU
1	Zsolt Érsek (HUN)	4	1	23	18	Q		3–5	5–3	5–3	5–3	5–4
2	Ulrich Schreck (FRG)	3	2	21	15	Q	5–3		3–5	3–5	5–1	5–1
3	Mauro Numa (ITA)	3	2	20	18	Q	3–5	5–3		5–3	2–5	5–2
4	Joachim Wendt (AUT)	3	2	21	20	Q	3–5	5–3	3–5		5–4	5–3
5	Liu Yunhong (CHN)	2	3	18	18	Q	3–5	1–5	5–2	4–5		5–1
6	Kenichi Umezawa (JPN)	0	5	11	25		4–5	1–5	2–5	3–5	1–5	

Source: Official Report, vol. 2, p. 373

==== Round 2 Pool D ====
Pos	Fencer	W	L	TF	TA	Qual.	SC	MG	PG	AE	TS	RD
1	Stefano Cerioni (ITA)	4	1	24	11	Q		5–2	5–2	5–1	4–5	5–1
2	Matthias Gey (FRG)	3	2	21	19	Q	2–5		5–3	4–5	5–4	5–2
3	Patrick Groc (FRA)	3	2	20	19	Q	2–5	3–5		5–4	5–3	5–2
4	Aris Enkelmann (GDR)	2	3	18	20	Q	1–5	5–4	4–5		3–5	5–1
5	Thierry Soumagne (BEL)	2	3	20	22	Q	5–4	4–5	3–5	5–3		3–5
6	Robert Davidson (AUS)	1	4	11	23		1–5	2–5	2–5	1–5	5–3	

Source: Official Report, vol. 2, p. 373

==== Round 2 Pool E ====
Pos	Fencer	W	L	TF	TA	Qual.	BZ	IM	DM	LR	KSP	YK
1	Bogusław Zych (POL)	5	0	25	16	Q		5–4	5–3	5–4	5–1	5–4
2	Ilgar Mamedov (URS)	4	1	24	17	Q	4–5		5–4	5–4	5–1	5–3
3	Donnie McKenzie (GBR)	2	3	21	19	Q	3–5	4–5		4–5	5–1	5–3
4	Luc Rocheleau (CAN)	2	3	22	20	Q	4–5	4–5	5–4		4–5	5–1
5	Kim Seung-Pyo (KOR)	2	3	13	19	Q	1–5	1–5	1–5	5–4		5–0
6	Yoshihiko Kanatsu (JPN)	0	5	11	25		4–5	3–5	3–5	1–5	0–5	

Source: Official Report, vol. 2, p. 373

==== Round 2 Pool F ====
Pos	Fencer	W	L	TF	TA	Qual.	LB	BK	KE	AMEH	PH	DL
1	Laurent Bel (FRA)	5	0	25	12	Q		5–4	5–3	5–2	5–1	5–2
2	Boris Koretsky (URS)	4	1	24	17	Q	4–5		5–4	5–3	5–1	5–4
3	Koji Emura (JPN)	2	3	19	19	Q	3–5	4–5		5–2	2–5	5–2
4	Abdel Monem El-Husseini (EGY)	2	3	17	20	Q	2–5	3–5	2–5		5–4	5–1
5	Pierre Harper (GBR)	1	4	14	22	Q	1–5	1–5	5–2	4–5		3–5
6	Dave Littell (USA)	1	4	14	23		2–5	4–5	2–5	1–5	5–3	

Source: Official Report, vol. 2, p. 373

==== Round 2 Pool G ====
Pos	Fencer	W	L	TF	TA	Qual.	LB	PO	BG	OK	PL	GNC
1	Leszek Bandach (POL)	3	2	21	15	Q		5–1	4–5	2–5	5–2	5–2
2	Philippe Omnès (FRA)	3	2	17	17	Q	1–5		5–2	1–5	5–2	5–3
3	Bill Gosbee (GBR)	3	2	20	21	Q	5–4	2–5		5–3	5–4	3–5
4	Ola Kajbjer (SWE)	2	3	18	18	Q	5–2	5–1	3–5		2–5	3–5
5	Peter Lewison (USA)	2	3	18	19	Q	2–5	2–5	4–5	5–2		5–2
6	Go Nak-Chun (KOR)	2	3	17	21		2–5	3–5	5–3	5–3	2–5	

Source: Official Report, vol. 2, p. 373

==== Round 2 Pool H ====
Pos	Fencer	W	L	TF	TA	Qual.	RG	ES	MS	UW	LS	AM
1	Róbert Gátai (HUN)	4	1	22	15	Q		5–4	2–5	5–3	5–1	5–2
2	Eric Strand (SWE)	4	1	24	17	Q	4–5		5–2	5–4	5–3	5–3
3	Marian Sypniewski (POL)	3	2	20	18	Q	5–2	2–5		3–5	5–4	5–2
4	Udo Wagner (GDR)	2	3	21	21	Q	3–5	4–5	5–3		4–5	5–3
5	Lao Shaopei (CHN)	2	3	18	23	Q	1–5	3–5	4–5	5–4		5–4
6	Ahmed Mohamed (EGY)	0	5	14	25		2–5	3–5	2–5	3–5	4–5	

Source: Official Report, vol. 2, p. 373

=== Round 3 ===
==== Round 3 Pool A ====
Pos	Fencer	W	L	TF	TA	Qual.	AE	MS	LB	AG	MM
1	Aris Enkelmann (GDR)	4	0	20	10	Q		5–2	5–3	5–1	5–4
2	Marian Sypniewski (POL)	3	1	17	13	Q	2–5		5–2	5–2	5–4
3	Laurent Bel (FRA)	2	2	15	16	Q	3–5	2–5		5–2	5–4
4	Andrés García (ESP)	1	3	10	16	Q	1–5	2–5	2–5		5–1
5	Mike Marx (USA)	0	4	13	20		4–5	4–5	4–5	1–5	

Source: Official Report, vol. 2, p. 374

==== Round 3 Pool B ====
Pos	Fencer	W	L	TF	TA	Qual.	PL	MN	BZ	TS	JE
1	Peter Lewison (USA)	3	1	18	10	Q		3–5	5–4	5–1	5–0
2	Mauro Numa (ITA)	3	1	19	12	Q	5–3		5–4	4–5	5–0
3	Bogusław Zych (POL)	2	2	18	15	Q	4–5	4–5		5–3	5–2
4	Thierry Soumagne (BEL)	1	3	12	19	Q	1–5	5–4	3–5		3–5
5	Jesús Esperanza (ESP)	1	3	7	18		0–5	0–5	2–5	5–3	

Source: Official Report, vol. 2, p. 374

==== Round 3 Pool C ====
Pos	Fencer	W	L	TF	TA	Qual.	SC	UW	PS	MG	AMEH
1	Stefano Cerioni (ITA)	3	1	19	13	Q		5–4	5–1	5–3	4–5
2	Udo Wagner (GDR)	2	2	17	13	Q	4–5		5–3	3–5	5–0
3	Pál Szekeres (HUN)	2	2	14	11	Q	1–5	3–5		5–1	5–0
4	Matthias Gey (FRG)	2	2	14	16	Q	3–5	5–3	1–5		5–3
5	Abdel Monem El-Husseini (EGY)	1	3	8	19		5–4	0–5	0–5	3–5	

Source: Official Report, vol. 2, p. 374

==== Round 3 Pool D ====
Pos	Fencer	W	L	TF	TA	Qual.	RG	KE	MB	JH	PG
1	Róbert Gátai (HUN)	3	1	18	13	Q		5–2	5–3	3–5	5–3
2	Koji Emura (JPN)	3	1	17	13	Q	2–5		5–4	5–2	5–2
3	Matthias Behr (FRG)	2	2	17	12	Q	3–5	4–5		5–1	5–1
4	Jens Howe (GDR)	2	2	13	13	Q	5–3	2–5	1–5		5–0
5	Patrick Groc (FRA)	0	4	6	20		3–5	2–5	1–5	0–5	

Source: Official Report, vol. 2, p. 374

==== Round 3 Pool E ====
Pos	Fencer	W	L	TF	TA	Qual.	IM	US	JW	BG	OK
1	Ilgar Mamedov (URS)	3	1	18	13	Q		5–2	5–4	3–5	5–2
2	Ulrich Schreck (FRG)	3	1	17	13	Q	2–5		5–4	5–2	5–2
3	Joachim Wendt (AUT)	2	2	18	15	Q	4–5	4–5		5–4	5–1
4	Benoît Giasson (CAN)	1	3	15	18	Q	5–3	2–5	4–5		4–5
5	Ola Kajbjer (SWE)	1	3	10	19		2–5	2–5	1–5	5–4	

Source: Official Report, vol. 2, p. 374

==== Round 3 Pool F ====
Pos	Fencer	W	L	TF	TA	Qual.	PO	AR	LY	KSP	ES
1	Philippe Omnès (FRA)	4	0	20	2	Q		5–1	5–0	5–1	5–0
2	Aleksandr Romankov (URS)	3	1	16	17	Q	1–5		5–4	5–4	5–4
3	Liu Yunhong (CHN)	2	2	14	13	Q	0–5	4–5		5–1	5–2
4	Kim Seung-Pyo (KOR)	1	3	11	18	Q	1–5	4–5	1–5		5–3
5	Eric Strand (SWE)	0	4	9	20		0–5	4–5	2–5	3–5	

Source: Official Report, vol. 2, p. 374

==== Round 3 Pool G ====
Pos	Fencer	W	L	TF	TA	Qual.	BG	BK	LB	LR	LS
1	Bill Gosbee (GBR)	4	0	20	11	Q		5–2	5–2	5–4	5–3
2	Boris Koretsky (URS)	3	1	17	15	Q	2–5		5–3	5–4	5–3
3	Leszek Bandach (POL)	2	2	15	15	Q	2–5	3–5		5–4	5–1
4	Luc Rocheleau (CAN)	1	3	17	19	Q	4–5	4–5	4–5		5–4
5	Lao Shaopei (CHN)	0	4	11	20		3–5	3–5	1–5	4–5	

Source: Official Report, vol. 2, p. 374

==== Round 3 Pool H ====
Pos	Fencer	W	L	TF	TA	Qual.	ZE	ZZ	PH	DM	ST
1	Zsolt Érsek (HUN)	4	0	20	6	Q		5–0	5–0	5–3	5–3
2	Zhang Zhicheng (CHN)	3	1	15	8	Q	0–5		5–0	5–2	5–1
3	Pierre Harper (GBR)	2	2	10	14	Q	0–5	0–5		5–3	5–1
4	Donnie McKenzie (GBR)	1	3	13	18	Q	3–5	2–5	3–5		5–3
5	Sergio Turiace (ARG)	0	4	8	20		3–5	1–5	1–5	3–5	

Source: Official Report, vol. 2, p. 374

=== Double elimination rounds ===
==== Winners brackets ====
===== Winners group 1 =====
Round of 32		Round of 16		Round of 8
Zsolt Érsek (HUN)	10
Pierre Harper (GBR)	5	Zsolt Érsek (HUN)	10
Peter Lewison (USA)	10	Peter Lewison (USA)	7
Marian Sypniewski (POL)	6			Zsolt Érsek (HUN)	7
Boris Koretsky (URS)	5			Udo Wagner (GDR)	10
Udo Wagner (GDR)	10	Udo Wagner (GDR)	10
Matthias Behr (FRG)	10	Matthias Behr (FRG)	8
Zhang Zhicheng (CHN)	4

===== Winners group 2 =====
Round of 32		Round of 16		Round of 8
Róbert Gátai (HUN)	10
Benoît Giasson (CAN)	6	Róbert Gátai (HUN)	8
Joachim Wendt (AUT)	2	Aleksandr Romankov (URS)	10
Aleksandr Romankov (URS)	10			Aleksandr Romankov (URS)	7
Mauro Numa (ITA)	10			Mauro Numa (ITA)	10
Koji Emura (JPN)	6	Mauro Numa (ITA)	10
Andrés García (ESP)	8	Laurent Bel (FRA)	5
Laurent Bel (FRA)	10

===== Winners group 3 =====
Round of 32		Round of 16		Round of 8
Philippe Omnès (FRA)	10
Thierry Soumagne (BEL)	8	Philippe Omnès (FRA)	9
Leszek Bandach (POL)	5	Aris Enkelmann (GDR)	10
Aris Enkelmann (GDR)	10			Aris Enkelmann (GDR)	9
Ulrich Schreck (FRG)	10			Ulrich Schreck (FRG)	10
Liu Yunhong (CHN)	5	Ulrich Schreck (FRG)	10
Donnie McKenzie (GBR)	5	Ilgar Mamedov (URS)	7
Ilgar Mamedov (URS)	10

===== Winners group 4 =====
Round of 32		Round of 16		Round of 8
Bogusław Zych (POL)	10
Luc Rocheleau (CAN)	3	Bogusław Zych (POL)	7
Matthias Gey (FRG)	10	Matthias Gey (FRG)	10
Bill Gosbee (GBR)	7			Matthias Gey (FRG)	10
Pál Szekeres (HUN)	8			Jens Howe (GDR)	6
Jens Howe (GDR)	10	Jens Howe (GDR)	10
Kim Seung-Pyo (KOR)	10	Kim Seung-Pyo (KOR)	5
Stefano Cerioni (ITA)	7

==== Repechages ====
===== Repechage 1 =====
Round of 16
Pierre Harper (GBR)	10
Marian Sypniewski (POL)	9
Boris Koretsky (URS)	10
Zhang Zhicheng (CHN)	8

Round of 8
Pierre Harper (GBR)	6
Philippe Omnès (FRA)	10
Boris Koretsky (URS)	10
Kim Seung-Pyo (KOR)	3

Round of 4
Philippe Omnès (FRA)	10
Boris Koretsky (URS)	9

Round of 2
Philippe Omnès (FRA)	6
Jens Howe (GDR)	10

===== Repechage 2 =====
Round of 16
Benoît Giasson (CAN)	5
Joachim Wendt (AUT)	10
Liu Yunhong (CHN)	10
Donnie McKenzie (GBR)	9

Round of 8
Joachim Wendt (AUT)	1
Bogusław Zych (POL)	10
Liu Yunhong (CHN)	6
Ilgar Mamedov (URS)	10

Round of 4
Bogusław Zych (POL)	7
Ilgar Mamedov (URS)	10

Round of 2
Ilgar Mamedov (URS)	7
Zsolt Érsek (HUN)	10

===== Repechage 3 =====
Round of 16
Koji Emura (JPN)	10
Andrés García (ESP)	9
Luc Rocheleau (CAN)	10
Bill Gosbee (GBR)	6

Round of 8
Koji Emura (JPN)	8
Peter Lewison (USA)	10
Luc Rocheleau (CAN)	1
Róbert Gátai (HUN)	10

Round of 4
Peter Lewison (USA)	10
Róbert Gátai (HUN)	8

Round of 2
Peter Lewison (USA)	1
Aleksandr Romankov (URS)	10

===== Repechage 4 =====
Round of 16
Thierry Soumagne (BEL)	10
Leszek Bandach (POL)	7
Pál Szekeres (HUN)	4
Stefano Cerioni (ITA)	10

Round of 8
Thierry Soumagne (BEL)	8
Laurent Bel (FRA)	10
Stefano Cerioni (ITA)	10
Matthias Behr (FRG)	8

Round of 4
Laurent Bel (FRA)	4
Stefano Cerioni (ITA)	10

Round of 2
Stefano Cerioni (ITA)	10
Aris Enkelmann (GDR)	8

=== Final round ===
Quarterfinals
Ulrich Schreck (FRG)	10
Jens Howe (GDR)	7
Zsolt Érsek (HUN)	5
Udo Wagner (GDR)	10
Matthias Gey (FRG)	8
Stefano Cerioni (ITA)	10
Aleksandr Romankov (URS)	11
Mauro Numa (ITA)	9

Semifinals
Ulrich Schreck (FRG)	8
Udo Wagner (GDR)	10
Stefano Cerioni (ITA)	10
Aleksandr Romankov (URS)	5

Finals
Udo Wagner (GDR)	7
Stefano Cerioni (ITA)	10
Third place
Ulrich Schreck (FRG)	8
Aleksandr Romankov (URS)	10

== Final classification ==
Fencer	Nation
Stefano Cerioni	Italy
Udo Wagner	East Germany
Aleksandr Romankov	Soviet Union
Ulrich Schreck	West Germany
Zsolt Érsek	Hungary
Mauro Numa	Italy
Jens Howe	East Germany
Matthias Gey	West Germany
Philippe Omnès	France
Ilgar Mamedov	Soviet Union
Aris Enkelmann	East Germany
Peter Lewison	United States
Laurent Bel	France
Róbert Gátai	Hungary
Bogusław Zych	Poland
Boris Koretsky	Soviet Union
Koji Emura	Japan
Benny Wendt	Austria
Matthias Behr	West Germany
Liu Yunhong	China
Luc Rocheleau	Canada
Thierry Soumagne	Belgium
Pierre Harper	Great Britain
Kim Seung-Pyo	South Korea
Zhang Zhicheng	China
Bill Gosbee	Great Britain
Marian Sypniewski	Poland
Pál Szekeres	Hungary
Leszek Bandach	Poland
Donnie McKenzie	Great Britain
Benoît Giasson	Canada
Andrés García	Spain
Ola Kajbjer	Sweden
Jesús Esperanza	Spain
Abdel Monem El-Husseini	Egypt
Mike Marx	United States
Lao Shaopei	China
Eric Strand	Sweden
Sergio Turiace	Argentina
Patrick Groc	France
Andrea Borella	Italy
Go Nak-Chun	South Korea
Dave Littell	United States
Robert Davidson	Australia
Ahmed Mohamed	Egypt
Kenichi Umezawa	Japan
Yoshihiko Kanatsu	Japan
Stephen Angers	Canada
Kim Yong-Guk	South Korea
Wang San-Tsai	Chinese Taipei
Antônio Machado	Brazil
Michel Youssef	Lebanon
Choy Kam Shing	Hong Kong
Roberto Lazzarini	Brazil
Anatol Richter	Austria
José Bandeira	Portugal
Lee Chung Man	Hong Kong
Austin Thomas	Aruba
Douglas Fonseca	Brazil
Thomas Åkerberg	Sweden
Saqer Al-Surayei	Kuwait
Khaled Al-Awadhi	Kuwait
Yan Wing-Shean	Chinese Taipei
Salman Mohamed	Kuwait
Weng Tak Fung	Hong Kong
Pedro Cornet	Paraguay
Alkindi	Indonesia
Zahi El-Khoury	Lebanon
