= Fencing at the 1988 Summer Olympics – Men's team foil =

Men's team foil at the Games of the XXIV Olympiad
- Venue: Olympic Fencing Gymnasium
- Dates: 26–27 September 1988
- Competitors: 76 from 16 nations

Medalists
1st place, gold medalist(s)		Aleksandr Romankov; Ilgar Mammadov; Vladimer Aptsiauri; Anvar Ibragimov; Boris Koretsky	Soviet Union
2nd place, silver medalist(s)		Matthias Gey; Thorsten Weidner; Matthias Behr; Ulrich Schreck; Thomas Endres	West Germany
3rd place, bronze medalist(s)		Zsolt Érsek; Pál Szekeres; István Szelei; István Busa; Róbert Gátai	Hungary

The men's team foil was one of eight fencing events on the fencing at the 1988 Summer Olympics programme. It was the seventeenth appearance of the event. The competition was held from 26 to 27 September 1988. 76 fencers from 16 nations competed.

== Rosters ==
Canada

- Stephen Angers
- Benoît Giasson
- Danek Nowosielski
- Luc Rocheleau

China

- Lao Shaopei
- Liu Yunhong
- Ye Chong
- Zhang Zhicheng

East Germany

- Aris Enkelmann
- Adrian Germanus
- Jens Gusek
- Jens Howe
- Udo Wagner

France

- Laurent Bel
- Patrick Groc
- Youssef Hocine
- Patrice Lhotellier
- Philippe Omnès

Great Britain

- Tony Bartlett
- Jonathan Davis
- Bill Gosbee
- Pierre Harper
- Donnie McKenzie

Hong Kong

- Choy Kam Shing
- Lee Chung Man
- Tong King King
- Weng Tak Fung

Hungary

- Zsolt Érsek
- Pál Szekeres
- István Szelei
- István Busa
- Róbert Gátai

Italy

- Andrea Borella
- Stefano Cerioni
- Federico Cervi
- Andrea Cipressa
- Mauro Numa

Japan

- Matsuo Azuma
- Harunobu Deno
- Koji Emura
- Yoshihiko Kanatsu
- Kenichi Umezawa

Kuwait

- Khaled Al-Awadhi
- Faisal Al-Harshani
- Saqer Al-Surayei
- Salman Mohamed

Poland

- Leszek Bandach
- Waldemar Ciesielczyk
- Piotr Kiełpikowski
- Marian Sypniewski
- Bogusław Zych

South Korea

- Hong Yeong-Seung
- Kim Seung-Pyo
- Kim Yong-Guk
- Go Nak-Chun
- Lee Yeong-Rok

Soviet Union

- Aleksandr Romankov
- Ilgar Mammadov
- Vladimer Aptsiauri
- Anvar Ibragimov
- Boris Koretsky

Sweden

- Peter Åkerberg
- Thomas Åkerberg
- Ola Kajbjer
- Eric Strand
- Per Täckenström

United States

- Peter Lewison
- Dave Littell
- Mike Marx
- Greg Massialas
- George Nonomura

West Germany

- Matthias Gey
- Thorsten Weidner
- Matthias Behr
- Ulrich Schreck
- Thomas Endres

== Results ==
=== Round 1 ===
==== Round 1 Pool A ====
In the first set of matches, East Germany beat Kuwait 9–0 and China defeated Great Britain 9–7. The second set saw the winners both win again (securing advancement) and the losers both lose again (resulting in elimination), as East Germany prevailed over Great Britain 9–2 and China won against Kuwait 9–3. Finally, East Germany took the top spot in the group by beating China 9–5 while Kuwait finished last after losing to Great Britain 9–5.

Pos	Team	W	L	BW	BL	Qual.	GDR	CHN	GBR	KUW
1	East Germany	3	0	27	7	Q		9–5	9–2	9–0
2	China	2	1	23	19	Q	5–9		9–7	9–3
3	Great Britain	1	2	18	23		2–9	7–9		9–5
4	Kuwait	0	3	8	27		0–9	3–9	5–9	

Source: Official Report, vol. 2, p. 390

==== Round 1 Pool B ====
In the first set of matches, the Soviet Union beat Hong Kong 9–0 and Poland defeated Canada 9–2. The second set saw the winners both win again (securing advancement) and the losers both lose again (resulting in elimination), as the Soviet Union prevailed over Canada 9–1 and Poland won against Hong Kong 9–0. Finally, the Soviet Union took the top spot in the group by beating Poland 9–3 while Hong Kong finished last after losing to Canada 9–1.

Pos	Team	W	L	BW	BL	Qual.	URS	POL	CAN	HKG
1	Soviet Union	3	0	27	4	Q		9–3	9–1	9–0
2	Poland	2	1	21	11	Q	3–9		9–2	9–0
3	Canada	1	2	12	19		1–9	2–9		9–1
4	Hong Kong	0	3	1	27		0–9	0–9	1–9	

Source: Official Report, vol. 2, pp. 390–91

==== Round 1 Pool C ====
In the first set of matches, France beat the United States 9–3 and West Germany defeated Sweden 9–0. The second set saw the winners both win again (securing advancement) and the losers both lose again (resulting in elimination), as France prevailed over Sweden 9–3 and West Germany won against the United States 9–4. Finally, France took the top spot in the group by beating West Germany 8–8 (64–63 on touches) while the United States finished last after losing to Sweden 9–2.

Pos	Team	W	L	BW	BL	Qual.	FRA	FRG	SWE	USA
1	France	3	0	26	14	Q		8.64–8.63	9–3	9–3
2	West Germany	2	1	26	12	Q	8.63–8.64		9–0	9–4
3	Sweden	1	2	12	20		3–9	0–9		9–2
4	United States	0	3	9	27		3–9	4–9	2–9	

Source: Official Report, vol. 2, p. 391

==== Round 1 Pool D ====
In the first set of matches, Italy beat Japan 9–2 and Hungary defeated South Korea 9–6. The second set saw the winners both win again (securing advancement) and the losers both lose again (resulting in elimination), as Italy prevailed over South Korea 9–5 and Hungary won against Japan 9–5. Finally, Italy took the top spot in the group by beating Hungary 9–6 while Japan finished last after losing to South Korea 9–4.

Pos	Team	W	L	BW	BL	Qual.	ITA	HUN	KOR	JPN
1	Italy	3	0	27	13	Q		9–6	9–5	9–2
2	Hungary	2	1	24	20	Q	6–9		9–6	9–5
3	South Korea	1	2	20	22		5–9	6–9		9–4
4	Japan	0	3	11	27		2–9	5–9	4–9	

Source: Official Report, vol. 2, pp. 391–92

=== Elimination rounds ===
Fifth place
B2	Poland	8
C1	France	8
Seventh place
D1	Italy	9
A2	China	4

Consolation semifinals
B2	Poland	9
D1	Italy	7
C1	France	9
A2	China	7

Quarterfinals
A1	East Germany	9
B2	Poland	3
C2	West Germany	9
D1	Italy	6
D2	Hungary	9
C1	France	4
B1	Soviet Union	9
A2	China	5

Semifinals
A1	East Germany	4
C2	West Germany	9
D2	Hungary	8
B1	Soviet Union	8

Final
C2	West Germany	5
B1	Soviet Union	9
Third place
A1	East Germany	5
D2	Hungary	9
