= Fencing at the 1988 Summer Olympics =

Fencing at the Games of the XXIV Olympiad

At the 1988 Summer Olympics, eight fencing events were contested. Men competed in both individual and team events for each of the three weapon types (épée, foil and sabre), but women competed only in foil events.

== Medal summary ==
=== Men's events ===
Games	Gold	Silver	Bronze
Individual épée	Arnd Schmitt; West Germany	Philippe Riboud; France	Andrey Shuvalov; Soviet Union
team épée	France; Frederic Delpla; Jean-Michel Henry; Olivier Lenglet; Philippe Riboud; Éric Srecki	West Germany; Elmar Borrmann; Volker Fischer; Thomas Gerull; Alexander Pusch; Arnd Schmitt	Soviet Union; Andrey Shuvalov; Pavel Kolobkov; Vladimir Reznichenko; Mikhail Tishko; Igor Tikhomirov
Individual foil	Stefano Cerioni; Italy	Udo Wagner; East Germany	Alexandr Romankov; Soviet Union
Team foil	Soviet Union; Vladimer Aptsiauri; Anvar Ibragimov; Boris Koretsky; Ilgar Mamedov; Aleksander Romankov	West Germany; Matthias Behr; Thomas Endres; Matthias Gey; Ulrich Schreck; Thorsten Weidner	Hungary; István Busa; Zsolt Érsek; Róbert Gátai; Pál Szekeres; István Szelei
Individual sabre	Jean-François Lamour; France	Janusz Olech; Poland	Giovanni Scalzo; Italy
Team sabre	Hungary; Imre Bujdosó; László Csongrádi; Imre Gedővári; György Nébald; Bence Szabó	Soviet Union; Andrey Alshan; Mikhail Burtsev; Sergey Koryashkin; Sergey Mindirgasov; Heorhiy Pohosov	Italy; Massimo Cavaliere; Gianfranco Dalla Barba; Marco Marin; Ferdinando Meglio; Giovanni Scalzo

=== Women's events ===
Games	Gold	Silver	Bronze
Individual foil	Anja Fichtel; West Germany	Sabine Bau; West Germany	Zita Funkenhauser; West Germany
Team foil	West Germany; Sabine Bau; Anja Fichtel; Zita Funkenhauser; Anette Klug; Christiane Weber	Italy; Francesca Bortolozzi Borella; Annapia Gandolfi; Lucia Traversa; Dorina Vaccaroni; Margherita Zalaffi	Hungary; Zsuzsa Jánosi; Edit Kovács; Gertrúd Stefanek; Zsuzsanna Szőcs; Katalin Tuschák

== Medal table ==
West Germany finished top of the fencing medal table at the 1988 Summer Olympics, which included a clean-sweap in the Women's foil events.

Rank	Nation	Gold	Silver	Bronze	Total
1	West Germany	3	3	1	7
2	France	2	1	0	3
3	Soviet Union	1	1	3	5
4	Italy	1	1	2	4
5	Hungary	1	0	2	3
6	East Germany	0	1	0	1
6	Poland	0	1	0	1
Totals (7 entries)		8	8	8	24

== Participating nations ==
A total of 317 fencers (248 men and 69 women) from 42 nations competed at the Seoul Games:

- Argentina (2)
- Aruba (1)
- Australia (2)
- Austria (5)
- Bahrain (4)
- Belgium (2)
- Bolivia (1)
- Brazil (4)
- Bulgaria (5)
- Canada (18)
- China (15)
- Chinese Taipei (2)
- Colombia (5)
- East Germany (7)
- Egypt (2)
- Finland (1)
- France (19)
- Great Britain (13)
- Hong Kong (7)
- Hungary (20)
- Indonesia (2)
- Italy (20)
- Japan (10)
- Jordan (1)
- Kuwait (8)
- Lebanon (2)
- Mexico (1)
- Monaco (1)
- Netherlands (5)
- New Zealand (1)
- Paraguay (2)
- Philippines (1)
- Poland (18)
- Portugal (3)
- Romania (2)
- South Korea (20)
- Soviet Union (20)
- Spain (8)
- Sweden (11)
- Switzerland (7)
- United States (19)
- West Germany (20)
