= Chinese Taipei at the 1988 Summer Olympics =

- Chinese Taipei Olympic flag
- IOC code: TPE
- NOC: Chinese Taipei Olympic Committee

in Seoul
- Competitors: 61 (43 men, 18 women) in 13 sports
- Flag bearer: Lee Fu-an
- Medals: Gold 0 Silver 0 Bronze 0 Total 0

Summer Olympics appearances (overview)
- 1956; 1960; 1964; 1968; 1972; 1976–1980; 1984; 1988; 1992; 1996; 2000; 2004; 2008; 2012; 2016; 2020; 2024

Other related appearances
- Republic of China (1924–1948)

The Republic of China competed as Chinese Taipei at the 1988 Summer Olympics in Seoul, South Korea. 61 competitors, including 43 men and 18 women, took part in 84 events in 13 sports.

== Competitors ==
The following is the list of number of competitors in the Games.

Sport	Men	Women	Total
Archery	3	3	6
Athletics	6	6	12
Boxing	2	–	2
Cycling	2	1	3
Fencing	2	0	2
Gymnastics	1	0	1
Judo	5	–	5
Modern pentathlon	2	–	2
Shooting	2	1	3
Swimming	3	5	8
Table tennis	4	2	6
Weightlifting	7	–	7
Wrestling	4	–	4
Total	43	18	61

== Archery ==
Chinese Taipei entered three men and three women in the archery competition. The women fared much better than the men in the individual competition, but the men's team was able to advance to the final whereas the women were eliminated in the semifinal.

Women's Individual Competition:

- Lai Fang-Mei – Semifinal (→ 12th place)
- Liu Pi-Yu – Quarterfinal (→ 15th place)
- Chin Chiu-Yueh – Preliminary Round (→ 27th place)

Men's Individual Competition:

- Hu Pei-Wen – Preliminary Round (→ 31st place)
- Yen Man-Sung – Preliminary Round (→ 42nd place)
- Chiu Ping-Kun – Preliminary Round (→ 45th place)

Women's Team Competition:

- Lai, Liu, and Chin – Semifinal (→ 11th place)

Men's Team Competition:

- Hu, Yen, and Chiu – Final (→ 7th place)

== Athletics ==
Men's Long Jump

- Nai Hui-Fang
  - Qualification — 7.45m (→ did not advance)

Men's Decathlon

- Lee Fu-an — 7517 points (→ 25th place)

1. 100 metres — 11.00s
2. Long Jump — 7.23m
3. Shot Put — 13.15m
4. High Jump — 2.03m
5. 400 metres — 49.73s
6. 110m Hurdles — 14.96s
7. Discus Throw — 38.06m
8. Pole Vault — 4.50m
9. Javelin Throw — 52.82m
10. 1.500 metres — 4:45.57s

Women's 4 × 100 m Relay

- Chang Fen-Hwa, Chen Wen-Ing, Chen Ya-Li, and Wang Shu-Hwa
  - Heat — 46.21 (→ did not advance)

Women's Heptathlon

- Hsu Hui-Ing
  - Final Result — 5290 points (→ 23rd place)

== Boxing ==
Men's Light Flyweight (– 48 kg)

- Liu Hsin-Hung
  - First Round — Bye
  - Second Round — Lost to Thomas Chisenga (Zambia), 1:4

== Cycling ==
Three cyclists, two men and one woman, represented Chinese Taipei in 1988.

Men's road race

- Hsu Jui-te

Men's sprint

- Lee Fu-hsiang

Men's 1 km time trial

- Lee Fu-hsiang

Men's points race

- Hsu Jui-te

Women's road race

- Yang Hsiu-chen

Women's sprint

- Yang Hsiu-chen

== Fencing ==
Two fencers, both men, represented Chinese Taipei in 1988.

Men's foil

- Wang San-Tsai
- Yan Wing-Shean

Men's épée

- Wang San-Tsai

Men's sabre

- Yan Wing-Shean

== Modern pentathlon ==
Two male pentathletes represented Chinese Taipei in 1988.

Men's Individual Competition:

- Li King-Ho — 4682pts (→ 44th place)
- Chuang Tang-Fa — 4435pts (→ 54th place)

Men's Team Competition:

- Li, and Chuang — 9117pts (→ 20th place)

== Swimming ==
Men's 50 m Freestyle

- Chiang Chi-Li
  1. Heat – 25.26 (→ did not advance, 51st place)

Men's 100 m Freestyle

- Chiang Chi-Li
  1. Heat – 55.87 (→ did not advance, 63rd place)

Men's 200 m Freestyle

- Wu Ming-Hsun
  1. Heat – 2:00.43 (→ did not advance, 55th place)

Men's 400 m Freestyle

- Wu Ming-Hsun
  1. Heat – 4:06.66 (→ did not advance, 40th place)

Men's 1500 m Freestyle

- Wu Ming-Hsun
  1. Heat – 15:59.74 (→ did not advance, 33rd place)

Men's 100 m Breaststroke

- Tsai Hsin-Yen
  1. Heat – 1:04.58 (→ did not advance, 24th place)

Men's 200 m Breaststroke

- Tsai Hsin-Yen
  1. Heat – 2:23.80 (→ did not advance, 33rd place)

Men's 200 m Individual Medley

- Tsai Hsin-Yen
  1. Heat – 2:17.95 (→ did not advance, 49th place)
- Chiang Chi-li
  1. Heat – 2:18.76 (→ did not advance, 51st place)

Women's 50 m Freestyle

- Wang Chi
  1. Heat – 28.73 (→ did not advance, 41st place)
- Sabrina Lum
  1. Heat – 28.82 (→ did not advance, 42nd place)

Women's 100 m Freestyle

- Wang Chi
  1. Heat – 1:01.72 (→ did not advance, 46th place)
- Sabrina Lum
  1. Heat – 1:02.11 (→ did not advance, 48th place)

Women's 200 m Freestyle

- Chang Hui-Chien
  1. Heat – 2:11.50 (→ did not advance, 38th place)

Women's 100 m Backstroke

- Wang Chi
  1. Heat – 1:09.56 (→ did not advance, 32nd place)

Women's 200 m Backstroke

- Wang Chi
  1. Heat – 2:36.60 (→ did not advance, 31st place)

Women's 100 m Breaststroke

- Carwai Seto
  1. Heat – 1:15.47 (→ did not advance, 32nd place)
- Chen Yu-Fang
  1. Heat – 1:20.95 (→ did not advance, 39th place)

Women's 200 m Breaststroke

- Carwai Seto
  1. Heat – 2:42.31 (→ did not advance, 35th place)
- Chen Yu-Fang
  1. Heat – 2:50.84 (→ did not advance, 41st place)

Women's 100 m Butterfly

- Chang Hui-Chien
  1. Heat – 1:07.36 (→ did not advance, 32nd place)

Women's 200 m Butterfly

- Chang Hui-Chien
  1. Heat – 2:25.50 (→ did not advance, 25th place)

Women's 200 m Individual Medley

- Carwai Seto
  1. Heat – 2:27.72 (→ did not advance, 28th place)
- Chen Yu-Fang
  1. Heat – 2:35.11 (→ did not advance, 33rd place)

Women's 400 m Individual Medley

- Chang Hui-Chien
  1. Heat – 5:13.20 (→ did not advance, 27th place)
- Chen Yu-Fang
  1. Heat – 5:28.15 (→ did not advance, 30th place)

Women's 4 × 100 m Freestyle Relay

- Wang Chi, Sabrina Lum, Carwai Seto, and Chang Hui-Chien
  1. Heat – 4:09.84 (→ did not advance, 15th place)

Women's 4 × 100 m Medley Relay

- Wang Chi, Carwai Seto, Chang Hui-Chien, and Chen Yu-Fang
  1. Heat – 4:39.49 (→ did not advance, 16th place)
