= Hungary at the 1988 Summer Olympics =

- IOC code: HUN
- NOC: Hungarian Olympic Committee

in Seoul
- Competitors: 188 (152 men and 36 women) in 20 sports
- Flag bearer: István Vaskuti
- Medals Ranked 6th: Gold 11 Silver 6 Bronze 6 Total 23

Summer Olympics appearances (overview)
- 1896; 1900; 1904; 1908; 1912; 1920; 1924; 1928; 1932; 1936; 1948; 1952; 1956; 1960; 1964; 1968; 1972; 1976; 1980; 1984; 1988; 1992; 1996; 2000; 2004; 2008; 2012; 2016; 2020; 2024

Other related appearances
- 1906 Intercalated Games

Hungary competed at the 1988 Summer Olympics in Seoul, South Korea. The nation returned after the Soviet bloc boycott of the 1984 Summer Olympics. 188 competitors, 152 men and 36 women, took part in 135 events in 20 sports.

== Medalists ==
Medal	Name	Sport	Event	Date
Gold	Tamás Darnyi	Swimming	Men's 400 metre individual medley	21 September
Gold	János Martinek	Modern pentathlon	Men's individual	22 September
Gold	László Fábián; János Martinek; Attila Mizsér	Modern pentathlon	Men's team	22 September
Gold	András Sike	Wrestling	Men's Greco-Roman 57 kg	22 September
Gold	József Szabó	Swimming	Men's 200 metre breaststroke	23 September
Gold	Zsolt Borkai	Gymnastics	Men's pommel horse	24 September
Gold	Tamás Darnyi	Swimming	Men's 200 metre individual medley	25 September
Gold	Krisztina Egerszegi	Swimming	Women's 200 metre backstroke	25 September
Gold	Imre Bujdosó; László Csongrádi; Imre Gedővári; György Nébald; Bence Szabó	Fencing	Men's team sabre	29 September
Gold	Zsolt Gyulay	Canoeing	Men's K-1 500 metres	30 September
Gold	Attila Ábrahám; Ferenc Csipes; Zsolt Gyulay; Sándor Hódosi	Canoeing	Men's K-4 1000 metres	1 October
Silver	Károly Güttler	Swimming	Men's 100 metre breaststroke	19 September
Silver	Tibor Komáromi	Wrestling	Men's Greco-Roman 82 kg	22 September
Silver	Krisztina Egerszegi	Swimming	Women's 100 metre backstroke	22 September
Silver	István Messzi	Weightlifting	Men's 82.5 kg	24 September
Silver	József Jacsó	Weightlifting	Men's 110 kg	27 September
Silver	Erika Géczi; Rita Kőbán; Erika Mészáros; Éva Rakusz	Canoeing	Women's K-4 500 metres	1 October
Bronze	Attila Záhonyi	Shooting	Men's 50 metre rifle prone	19 September
Bronze	Zoltán Kovács	Shooting	Men's 25 metre rapid fire pistol	23 September
Bronze	István Busa; Zsolt Érsek; Róbert Gátai; Pál Szekeres; István Szelei	Fencing	Men's team foil	27 September
Bronze	Zsuzsa Jánosi; Edit Kovács; Gertrúd Stefanek; Zsuzsa Szőcs; Katalin Tuschák	Fencing	Women's team foil	28 September
Bronze	Róbert Isaszegi	Boxing	Light flyweight	29 September
Bronze	Attila Ábrahám; Ferenc Csipes	Canoeing	Men's K-2 500 metres	30 September

== Competitors ==
The following is the list of number of competitors in the Games.

Sport	Men	Women	Total
Athletics	12	3	15
Boxing	9	–	9
Canoeing	12	4	16
Cycling	1	0	1
Diving	0	3	3
Fencing	15	5	20
Gymnastics	6	8	14
Handball	14	0	14
Judo	7	–	7
Modern pentathlon	3	–	3
Rowing	4	4	8
Sailing	3	0	3
Shooting	11	4	15
Swimming	10	3	13
Table tennis	3	2	5
Tennis	2	0	2
Water polo	13	–	13
Weightlifting	10	–	10
Wrestling	18	–	18
Total	152	36	188

== Athletics ==
Men's 100 metres

- Attila Kovács
- István Tatár
- György Fetter

Men's 200 metres

- Attila Kovács

Men's 110 metres Hurdles

- György Bakos

Men's 4×100 metres Relay

- György Bakos
- László Karaffa
- István Tatár
- Attila Kovács

Men's 3,000m Steeplechase

- Bela Vago

- Heat — did not start (→ did not advance)

Men's Long Jump

- László Szalma

- Qualification — 7.91m
- Final — 8.00m (→ 6th place)

Men's Pole Vault

- István Bagyula

Men's Hammer Throw

- Tibor Gécsek

- Qualification — 77.12m
- Final — 78.36m (→ 6th place)

- Imre Szitás

- Qualification — 76.24m
- Final — 77.04m (→ 7th place)

- József Vida

- Qualification — 74.30m (→ did not advance)

Men's Decathlon

- Dezső Szabó — 8093 points (→ 13th place)

1. 100 metres — 11.02s
2. Long Jump — 7.29m
3. Shot Put — 12.92m
4. High Jump — 2.06m
5. 400 metres — 48.23s
6. 110m Hurdles — 14.96s
7. Discus Throw — 39.54m
8. Pole Vault — 5.00m
9. Javelin Throw — 56.80m
10. 1.500 metres — 4:17.85s

Men's 20 km Walk

- Sándor Urbanik

- Final — 1:23:18 (→ 21st place)

Men's 50 km Walk

- Sándor Urbanik

- Final — did not finish (→ no ranking)

Women's Marathon

- Karolina Szabo

- Final — 2"32.26 (→ 13th place)

Women's Javelin Throw

- Zsuzsa Malovecz

- Qualification — 64.30m
- Final — 54.58m (→ 12th place)

== Boxing ==
Athlete	Event	First Round	Second Round	Third Round	Quarterfinal	Semifinal	Final	
Athlete	Event	Opposition Result	Opposition Result	Opposition Result	Opposition Result	Opposition Result	Opposition Result	Rank
Róbert Isaszegi	Light flyweight	Bye	Moore (GUY); W 5–0	Abboud (IRQ); W RSC	Sasakul (THA); W 3–2	Carbajal (USA); L 1–4	Did not advance	3rd place, bronze medalist(s)
László Szőke	Featherweight	Wanjau (KEN); L on points	Did not advance				Did not advance	=33

== Cycling ==
One male cyclist represented Hungary in 1988.

Men's individual pursuit

- Miklós Somogyi

Men's point race

- Miklós Somogyi

== Diving ==
Women

Athlete	Events	Preliminaries		Final	
Athlete	Events	Points	Rank	Points	Rank
Katalin Haász	3 m springboard	378.27	22	Did not advance	
Ágnes Gerlach	3 m springboard	355.14	25	Did not advance	
Ildikó Kelemen	10 m platform	355.17	12 Q	322.59	11

== Fencing ==
20 fencers, 15 men and 5 women, represented Hungary in 1988.

Men's foil

- Zsolt Érsek
- Róbert Gátai
- Pál Szekeres

Men's team foil

- Zsolt Érsek, Pál Szekeres, István Szelei, István Busa, Róbert Gátai

Men's épée

- Ernő Kolczonay
- Zoltán Székely
- Szabolcs Pásztor

Men's team épée

- László Fábián, Ferenc Hegedűs, Ernő Kolczonay, Szabolcs Pásztor, Zoltán Székely

Men's sabre

- György Nébald
- Imre Gedővári
- Imre Bujdosó

Men's team sabre

- György Nébald, Bence Szabó, Imre Bujdosó, Imre Gedővári, László Csongrádi

Women's foil

- Zsuzsa Némethné Jánosi
- Gertrúd Stefanek
- Edit Kovács

Women's team foil

- Zsuzsa Némethné Jánosi, Gertrúd Stefanek, Zsuzsa Szőcs, Katalin Tuschák, Edit Kovács

== Modern pentathlon ==
Three male pentathletes represented Hungary in 1988. János Martinek won an individual gold and the team also won gold too.

Men's Individual Competition:

- János Martinek — 5404 pts (→ Gold Medal)
- Attila Mizsér — 5281 pts (→ 4th place)
- László Fábián — 5201 pts (→ 7th place)

Men's Team Competition:

- Martinek, Mizser, and Fábián — 15886 pts (→ Gold Medal)

== Swimming ==
Men's 100 m Freestyle

- Mihály-Richard Bodór

- Heat — 52.77 (→ did not advance, 42nd place)

Men's 200 m Freestyle

- Zoltán Szilágyi

- Heat — 1:53.75 (→ did not advance, 34th place)

- Norbert Agh

- Heat — 1:54.72 (→ did not advance, 37th place)

Men's 200 m Freestyle

- Zoltán Szilágyi

- Heat — 1:53.75 (→ did not advance, 34th place)

- Norbert Agh

- Heat — 1:54.72 (→ did not advance, 37th place)

Men's 400 m Freestyle

- Valter Kalaus

- Heat — 3:53.44
- B-Final — 3:53.24 (→ 10th place)

- Zoltán Szilágyi

- Heat — 3:56.29
- B-Final — 3:56.00 (→ 16th place)

Men's 1500 m Freestyle

- Valter Kalaus

- Heat — 15:23.01 (→ did not advance, 15th place)

- Norbert Agh

- Heat — 15:52.80 (→ did not advance, 28th place)

Men's 100 m Backstroke

- Tamás Deutsch

- Heat — 58.65 (→ did not advance, 28th place)

Men's 200 m Backstroke

- Tamás Deutsch

- Heat — 2:03.17
- B-Final — 2:04.42 (→ 14th place)

- Tamás Darnyi

- Heat — DSQ (→ did not advance, no ranking)

Men's 100 m Breaststroke

- Károly Güttler

- Heat — 1:02.80
- Final — 1:02.05 (→ Silver Medal)

- Tamás Debnár

- Heat — 1:03.08
- Final — 1:02.50 (→ 5th place)

Men's 200 m Breaststroke

- József Szabó

- Heat — 2:14.97
- Final — 2:13.52 (→ Gold Medal)

- Péter Szabó

- Heat — 2:17.10
- Final — 2:17.12 (→ 8th place)

Men's 200 m Individual Medley

- Tamás Darnyi

- Heat — 2:02.15
- Final — 2:00.17 (→ Gold Medal)

- József Szabó

- Heat — 2:09.08 (→ did not advance, 23rd place)

Men's 400 m Individual Medley

- Tamás Darnyi

- Heat — 4:16.55
- Final — 4:14.75 (→ Gold Medal)

- József Szabó

- Heat — 4:20.85
- Final — 4:18.15 (→ 4th place)

Men's 4 × 100 m Medley Relay

- Tamás Deutsch, Károly Güttler, Valter Kalaus, and Mihály-Richard Bodór

- Heat — 3:52.24 (→ did not advance, 16th place)

Women's 400 m Freestyle

- Judit Csabai

- Heat — 4:25.52 (→ did not advance, 29th place)

Women's 800 m Freestyle

- Judit Csabai

- Heat — 8:56.37 (→ did not advance, 23rd place)

Women's 100 m Backstroke

- Krisztina Egerszegi

- Heat — 1:02.09
- Final — 1:01.56 (→ Silver Medal)

Women's 200 m Backstroke

- Krisztina Egerszegi

- Heat — 2:11.01
- Final — 2:09.29 (→ Gold Medal)

Women's 100 m Breaststroke

- Gabriella Csépe

- Heat — 1:11.10
- B-Final — 1:11.24 (→ 14th place)

== Water polo ==
=== Men's team competition ===
- Preliminary round (group B)

- Defeated Greece (12-10)
- Lost to Yugoslavia (9-10)
- Drew with Spain (6-6)
- Defeated China (14-7)
- Lost to United States (9-10)

- Classification Round (Group D)

- Drew with Italy (9-9)
- Defeated Australia (13-5) → 5th place

- Team roster

- Péter Kuna
- Gábor Bujka
- Gábor Schmiedt
- Zsolt Petőváry
- István Pintér
- Tibor Keszthelyi
- Balázs Vincze
- Zoltán Mohi
- Tibor Pardi
- László Tóth
- András Gyöngyösi
- Zoltán Kósz
- Imre Tóth

- Head coach: Zoltan Kasas
