= Chinese Taipei at the 1984 Summer Olympics =

- Chinese Taipei Olympic flag
- IOC code: TPE
- NOC: Chinese Taipei Olympic Committee

in Los Angeles
- Competitors: 38 (31 men and 7 women) in 12 sports
- Flag bearer: Lee Fu-an
- Medals Ranked 43rd: Gold 0 Silver 0 Bronze 1 Total 1

Summer Olympics appearances (overview)
- 1956; 1960; 1964; 1968; 1972; 1976–1980; 1984; 1988; 1992; 1996; 2000; 2004; 2008; 2012; 2016; 2020; 2024

Other related appearances
- Republic of China (1924–1948)

The Republic of China (ROC) competed as Chinese Taipei at the 1984 Summer Olympics in Los Angeles, California for the first time. The change in name was a result of the Nagoya Resolution, adopted by the International Olympic Committee in 1979 after the objections raised in the 1970s by the People's Republic of China (PRC) over the political status of Taiwan. The IOC restrictions over the ROC name led to the ROC boycott of the Summer Games of 1976 and 1980; the PRC boycotted the Olympic Games prior to the adoption of the resolution. The 1984 Summer Games Chinese Taipei team included 31 men and 7 women, taking part in 40 events in 12 sports. In weightlifting, athletes both from Chinese Taipei and the People's Republic of China won medals.

== Medalists ==
| Medal | Name | Sport | Event | Date |
|---|---|---|---|---|
| Bronze | Tsai Wen-yee | Weightlifting | Men's 60 kg | 31 July |

== Archery ==
Chinese Taipei entered one man and one woman in the archery competition. Both placed 42nd in their respective divisions.

Women's Individual Competition

- Lu Jui-Chiung — 2226 points (→ 42nd place)

Men's Individual Competition

- Tu Chih-Chen — 2376 points (→ 42nd place)

== Athletics ==
=== Track and road events ===
| Athlete | Event | Heats | | Semifinal | | Final | |
| Athlete | Event | Result | Rank | Result | Rank | Result | Rank |
|---|---|---|---|---|---|---|---|
| Chen Chang-Ming | Men's marathon | — | | | | 2:29:53 | 56 |
| Lai Lih-Jiau | Women's 400 m hurdles | 58.54 | 5 | Did not advance | | | |

=== Field events ===
| Athlete | Event | Qualification | | Final | |
| Athlete | Event | Result | Rank | Result | Rank |
|---|---|---|---|---|---|
| Lee Fu-an | Men's long jump | 7.23 m | 20 | Did not advance | |
| Liu Chin-Chiang | Men's high jump | 2.10 m | 26 | Did not advance | |
| Chen Hung-Yen | Men's javelin throw | 71.48 m | 24 | Did not advance | |
| Liu Yen-Chiu | Women's high jump | 1.70 m | 29 | Did not advance | |
| Lee Hui-Chen | Women's javelin throw | 52.46 m | 21 | Did not advance | |

=== Combined events ===
| Athlete | Event | Result | Rank |
|---|---|---|---|
| Ku Chin-shui | Men's decathlon | 7629 | 16 |
| Lee Fu-an | Men's decathlon | 7541 | 19 |
| Tsai Li-Jiau | Women's heptathlon | 5447 | 18 |

== Boxing ==
Men's Light Flyweight (– 48 kg)

- Chung Pao-Ming
  - First Round — Bye
  - Second Round — Lost to Keith Mwila (KEN), RSC-2

== Cycling ==
Two cyclists represented Chinese Taipei in 1984.

Sprint

- Lee Fu-hsiang

1000m time trial

- Lee Fu-hsiang

Individual pursuit

- Hsu Chin-te

== Fencing ==
Two fencers, both men, represented Chinese Taipei in 1984.

Men's foil

- Lee Tai-Chung
- Tsai Shing-Hsiang

Men's épée

- Lee Tai-Chung
- Tsai Shing-Hsiang

== Modern pentathlon ==
One male pentathlete represented Chinese Taipei in 1984.

Individual

- Chen Kung-Liang

== Swimming ==
Men's 100m Freestyle

- Michael Miao
  - Heat — 52.76 (→ did not advance, 30th place)

Men's 200m Freestyle

- Michael Miao
  - Heat — 1:55.01 (→ did not advance, 27th place)

Men's 400m Freestyle

- Wu Ming-Hsun
  - Heat — 4:16.49 (→ did not advance, 34th place)
- Lin Chun-Hong
  - Heat — 4:20.65 (→ did not advance, 35th place)

Men's 1500m Freestyle

- Wu Ming-Hsun
  - Heat — 16:14.40 (→ did not advance, 23rd place)
- Lin Chun-Hong
  - Heat — 16:44.94 (→ did not advance, 25th place)

Men's 400m Individual Medley

- Wu Ming-Hsun
  - Heat — 5:02.94 (→ did not advance, 22nd place)

Women's 200m Freestyle

- Wen San
  - Heat — 2:05.85 (→ did not advance, 18th place)
- Chang Hui-Chien
  - Heat — 2:13.41 (→ did not advance, 28th place)

Women's 400m Freestyle

- Wen San
  - Heat — 4:23.30
  - B-Final — 4:21.61 (→ 15th place)
- Chang Hui-Chien
  - Heat — 4:42.47 (→ did not advance, 24th place)

Women's 800m Freestyle

- Wen San
  - Heat — 9:09.73 (→ did not advance, 17th place)
- Chang Hui-Chien
  - Heat — 9:34.93 (→ did not advance, 20th place)

Women's 200m Butterfly

- Wen San
  - Heat — 2:21.10 (→ did not advance, 22nd place)
- Chang Hui-Chien
  - Heat — 2:24.89 (→ did not advance, 27th place)
