= Åkerberg =

Åkerberg is a Swedish surname. Notable people with the surname include:

- Peter Åkerberg (born 1960), Swedish fencer
- Thomas Åkerberg (born 1959), Swedish fencer
- Ulrika Åkerberg (born 1941), Swedish curler
