= Nonomura =

Nonomura (written: 野々村) is a Japanese surname. Notable people with the surname include:

- George Nonomura (born 1958), American fencer
- Ryutaro Nonomura (野々村竜太郎; born 1966), Japanese former politician and convicted fraudster
- Shogo Nonomura (野々村 笙吾; born 1993), Japanese artistic gymnast
- Taiyo Nonomura (野々村太陽; born 2001), Japanese speed-skater
- Yoshikazu Nonomura (野々村 芳和) (born 1972), Japanese footballer

Fictional characters:

- Kotori Nonomura (野々村 小鳥), character in the visual novel series Triangle Heart
- Uriko Nonomura (野々村 宇理子), character in the video game series Bloody Roar
