= Chen Liang =

Chen Liang may refer to:

- Chen Kung-Liang (born 1964), Taiwanese modern pentathlete
- Liang Chen (born 1989), Chinese tennis player
