= Lewison =

Lewison is a surname. Notable people with the surname include:

- Bernard Lewison (1902–1984), American politician and businessman
- Ian Lewison (born 1981), English boxer
- Jaren Lewison (born 2000), American actor
- Kim Lewison (born 1952), British judge
- Peter Lewison (born 1961), American fencer
