= Kanatsu =

Kanatsu may refer to:

- 6976 Kanatsu, a main-belt asteroid, named after Japanese amateur astronomer Kazuyoshi Kanatsu (born 1953)
- Yoshihiko Kanatsu (born 1961), a Japanese fencer
