= Jarosław Kisiel =

Polish fencer (born 1964)

Personal information
- Born: 22 May 1964 (age 62) Giżycko, Poland

Sport
- Sport: Fencing
Medal record
Representing Poland
Summer Universiade
Gold medal – first place	1989 Duisburg	Team sabre
Bronze medal – third place	1989 Duisburg	Individual sabre

Jarosław Kisiel (born 22 May 1964) is a Polish fencer. He competed in the team sabre event at the 1992 Summer Olympics.
