= Fencing at the 1989 Summer Universiade =

Fencing events were contested at the 1989 Summer Universiade in Duisburg, West Germany.

== Medal overview ==
=== Men's events ===
| Event | Gold | Silver | Bronze |
|---|---|---|---|
| Individual foil | Mauro Numa (ITA) | Zsolt Érsek (HUN) | Stefano Cerioni (ITA) |
| Team foil | Cuba (CUB) | Hungary (HUN) | Italy (ITA) |
| Individual épée | Carlos Pedroso (CUB) | Maurizio Randazzo (ITA) | Wilfredo Loyola (CUB) |
| Team épée | Italy (ITA) | Cuba (CUB) | West Germany (FRG) |
| Individual sabre | Bence Szabó (HUN) | Toni Terenzi (ITA) | Jarosław Kisiel (POL) |
| Team sabre | Poland (POL) | Hungary (HUN) | Italy (ITA) |

=== Women's events ===
| Event | Gold | Silver | Bronze |
|---|---|---|---|
| Individual foil | Diana Bianchedi (ITA) | Zsuzsa Jánosi (HUN) | Giovanna Trillini (ITA) |
| Team foil | Italy (ITA) | West Germany (FRG) | China (CHN) |
| Individual épée | Diana Eori (HUN) | Taymi Chappé (CUB) | Wen Dong (CHN) |
| Team épée | Hungary (HUN) | Poland (POL) | Sweden (SWE) |

== Medal table ==
| Rank | Nation | Gold | Silver | Bronze | Total |
|---|---|---|---|---|---|
| 1 | Italy (ITA) | 4 | 2 | 4 | 10 |
| 2 | Hungary (HUN) | 3 | 4 | 0 | 7 |
| 3 | Cuba (CUB) | 2 | 2 | 1 | 5 |
| 4 | Poland (POL) | 1 | 1 | 1 | 3 |
| 5 | West Germany (FRG) | 0 | 1 | 1 | 2 |
| 6 | China (CHN) | 0 | 0 | 2 | 2 |
| 7 | Sweden (SWE) | 0 | 0 | 1 | 1 |
| Totals (7 entries) | | 10 | 10 | 10 | 30 |
