= Stefano Cerioni =

Italian fencer (born 1964)

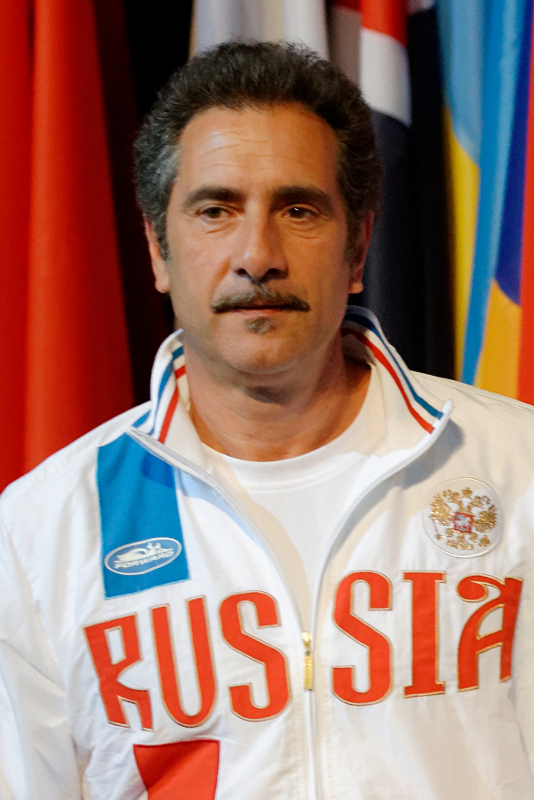
- Cerioni in 2014

Personal information
- Born: 24 January 1964 (age 62) Madrid, Spain
- Height: 1.91 m (6 ft 3 in)
- Weight: 87 kg (192 lb)

Fencing career
- Sport: Fencing
- Country: Italy
- Weapon: Foil
- Hand: Right-handed
- Club: CS Jesi / GS Fiamme Oro
Medal record
Men's foil fencing
Representing Italy
Olympic Games
Gold medal – first place	1984 Los Angeles	Team foil
Gold medal – first place	1988 Seoul	Individual foil
Bronze medal – third place	1984 Los Angeles	Individual foil
World Championships
Gold medal – first place	1985 Barcelona	Team foil
Gold medal – first place	1994 Athens	Team foil
Silver medal – second place	1993 Essen	Team foil
Bronze medal – third place	1997 Cape Town	Team foil
Summer Universiade
Gold medal – first place	1991 Sheffield	Team foil
Bronze medal – third place	1985 Kobe	Team foil
Bronze medal – third place	1989 Duisburg	Individual foil
Bronze medal – third place	1989 Duisburg	Team foil
Mediterranean Games
Gold medal – first place	1997 Bari	Individual foil
Silver medal – second place	1993 Languedoc	Individual foil

Stefano Cerioni (born 24 January 1964) is an Italian foil fencer, Olympic team champion in 1984, Olympic champion in 1988 and World team champion in 1985 and 1994. He became a fencing master, then a director of foil, first for Italy, then for Russia, then again for Italy.

== Athletic career ==
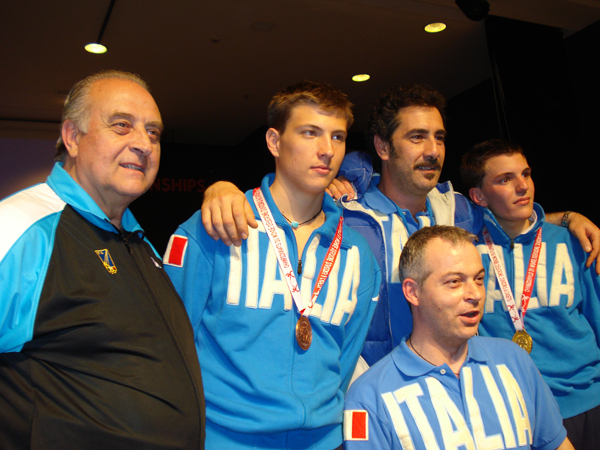
Cerioni with the junior Italy team in 2007, left to right: Salvatore Di Naro, Valerio Aspromonte, Cerioni, and Martino Minuto

Cerioni was born in 1964 in Madrid, where his father was working. His parents moved back to Jesi, in Italy, when he was a child. He learned fencing under Ezio Triccoli, a family friend, who also coached Olympic champions Valentina Vezzali and Giovanna Trillini in their formative years. He practiced both sabre and foil, but foil quickly gained his preference.

Cerioni won the silver medal at the 1983 Junior World Championships in Budapest, then the gold medal in 1984 in Leningrad. He made his Olympic début at the 1984 Summer Olympics in Los Angeles. He made his way to the semi-finals, where he met teammate Mauro Numa. Despite a 6–1 lead in the first period, he was defeated 11–9. He fenced Frédéric Pietruszka of France in the “small final” and prevailed 10–5 to win the bronze medal.

At the World Championships in Barcelona, Cerioni reached the semi-finals, where he was defeated by teammate Andrea Cipressa. He fenced Germany's Harald Stein for the bronze medal, but was disqualified for unsportsmanlike behaviour. His bad temper got the best of him once again in the 1986 World Championships in Sofia: this time he received a full-year suspension after abusing the referees during his bout against Austria's Joachim Wendt. After his return to competition, Cerioni won the 1987–88 Fencing World Cup. At the 1988 Summer Olympics in Seoul, Cerioni defeated three-time World Champion Aleksandr Romankov from the Soviet Union in the semi-finals, then East Germany's Udo Wagner, to earn the gold medal. The team ranked only 7th.

At the 1992 Summer Olympics he was eliminated in the round of 32 and could not defend his title. Italy also failed to earn a medal in the team event. A year later, Cerioni won the gold medal in the 1993 Mediterranean Games and a team silver medal in the 1993 World Championships in Essen, followed by a team gold medal in the 1994 World Championships in Athens.

In March 1996 his maestro Ezio Triccoli died. Cerioni took over Club Scherma Jesi while going on with his career, earning a team silver medal at the 1997 World Championships in Cape Town. He retired in 2000 after 16 years in the national team.

== Coaching career ==
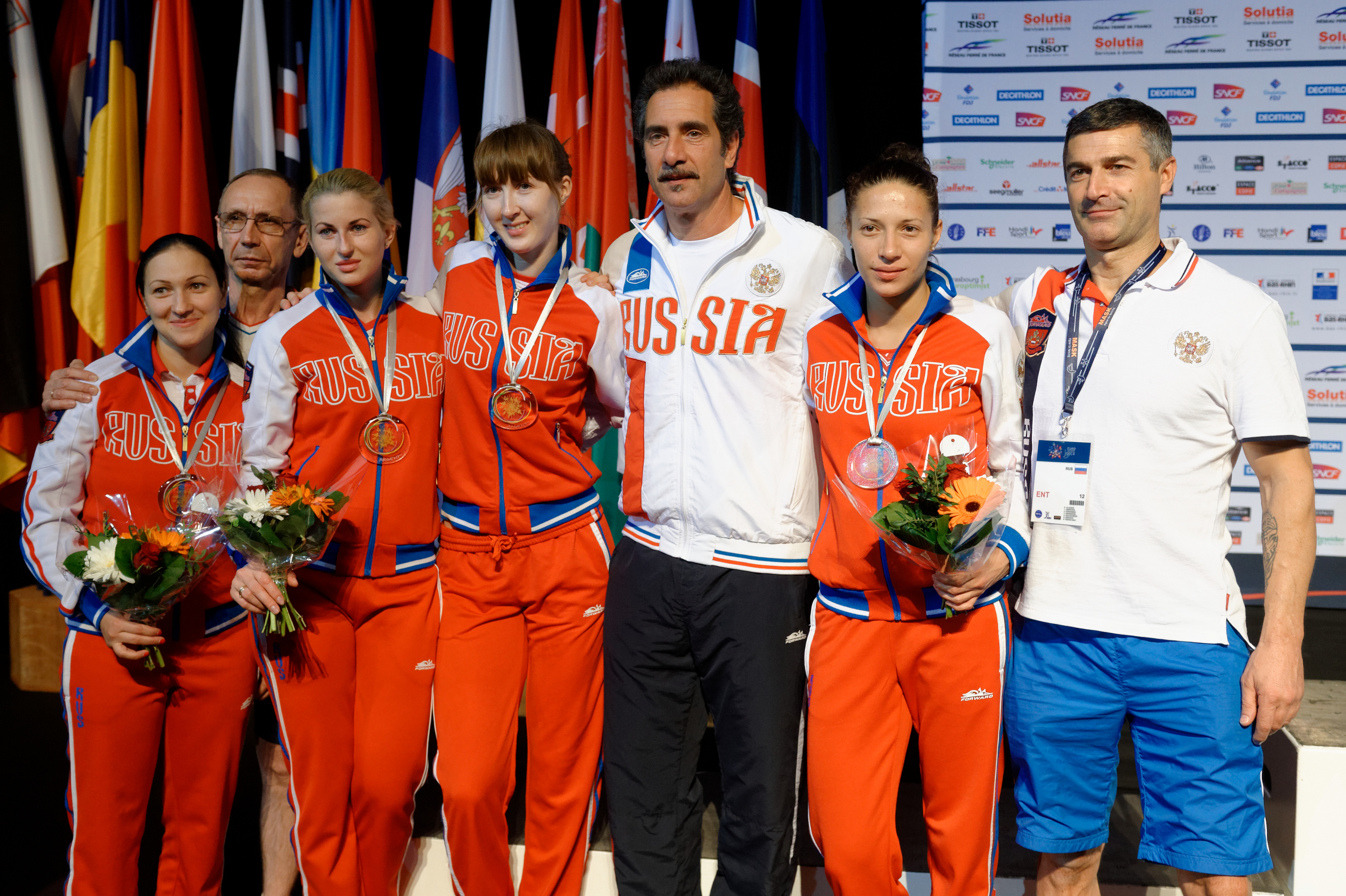
Cerioni with the Russian team at the 2014 European Fencing Championships

Cerioni became a fencing master after he ended his athlete career. His most famous pupil is Elisa Di Francisca, whom he trained since she was 8. After the 2004 Summer Olympics he succeeded Andrea Magro as director of foil at the Italian Fencing Federation for the men's team. In 2008 his responsibilities were extended to women's. Under his direction Italy won gold medals in men's team foil and women's team foil and all three medals in women's foil at the 2012 Summer Olympics, amongst which his own student Di Francesca.

In December 2012 he announced that he would join the Russian Fencing Federation–Italy's main rival–as director of foil for both men and women, taking with him assistant coach Giovanni Bortolaso and physical conditioning trainer Maurizio Zomparelli. In the 2013 World Championships in Budapest, Italy took the gold medal in men's team foil and two bronze medals in women's foil. The 2014 European Championships in Strasbourg, brought two silver medals and two bronze medals. In the World Championships at home in Kazan, Aleksey Cheremisinov took the title while the women's team earned a silver medal.
