= Sabrina Lum =

Taiwanese swimmer

Personal information
- Born: 24 May 1971 (age 55)

Chinese name
- Traditional Chinese: 林鳳珠
- Hanyu Pinyin: Lín Fèngzhū
- Jyutping: Lam4 Fung6zyu1

Sport
- Sport: Swimming

Sabrina Lum (born 24 May 1971) is an American swimmer who represented Chinese Taipei at the 1988 Summer Olympics in three events. Lum grew up in Monterey, California, and was a senior at Monterey High School during her participation in the Olympics. She later attended the University of California, San Diego, where she was a member of the UC San Diego Tritons women's swim team.
