= Taymi Chappé =

Cuban-Spanish fencer (1968–2020)

Personal information
- Full name: Taymi Chappé Valladares
- Born: 11 September 1968 Havana, Cuba
- Died: 3 November 2020 (aged 52) Miami, United States

Sport
- Country: Cuba; Spain
- Sport: Fencing
Medal record
Representing Cuba
Pan American Games
| Gold medal – first place | 1991 Havana | Individual épée |
| Silver medal – second place | 1991 Havana | Team épée |
Summer Universiade
| Silver medal – second place | 1989 Duisburg | Individual épée |
World Championships
| Gold medal – first place | 1990 Lyon | Individual épée |
Representing Spain
World Championships
| Gold medal – first place | 1994 Athens | Team épée |
| Bronze medal – third place | 1997 Cape Town | Individual épée |

Taymi Chappé Valladares (11 September 1968 – 3 November 2020) was a Cuban-Spanish fencer. She competed in the women's individual épée event at the 1996 Summer Olympics. She won gold in women's épée at the 1990 World Championships under the Cuban flag. For Spain, she won a team gold at the 1994 World Championships and a bronze medal at the 1997 World Fencing Championships.

Chappé died on 3 November 2020, aged 52.
