= Tsai Hsin-yen =

Taiwanese swimmer

Personal information
- Full name: 蔡 心嚴, Pinyin: Cài Xīn-yán
- Born: 10 May 1971 (age 55)

Sport
- Sport: Swimming

Tsai Hsin-yen (born 10 May 1971) is a Taiwanese swimmer. He competed in three events at the 1988 Summer Olympics.
