= Michael Miao =

Taiwanese swimmer

Personal information
- Born: 13 July 1963 (age 62)

Sport
- Sport: Swimming
- College team: Harvard Crimson; University of Southern California

Michael Miao (born 13 July 1963) is a Taiwanese swimmer. He competed in two events at the 1984 Summer Olympics.
