= Tibor Keszthelyi =

Hungarian water polo player

Personal information
- Nationality: Hungarian
- Born: 19 January 1960 (age 65); Budapest, Hungary

Sport
- Sport: Water polo

Tibor Keszthelyi (born 19 January 1960) is a Hungarian water polo player. He competed in the men's tournament at the 1988 Summer Olympics.
