= Chiang Chi-li =

Taiwanese swimmer

Personal information
- Full name: 姜 基禮, Pinyin: Jiāng Jī-lǐ
- Born: 28 January 1971 (age 55)

Sport
- Sport: Swimming

Chiang Chi-li (born 28 January 1971) is a Taiwanese swimmer. He competed in three events at the 1988 Summer Olympics.
