= Russian Fencing Federation =

Governing body of fencing in Russia

- Category: Fencing
- Jurisdiction: Russia
- Abbreviation: RFF/ФФР/FFR
- Founded: 1951/1992
- Affiliation: International Fencing Federation (FIE)
- Regional affiliation: ~~European Fencing Confederation~~ (suspended)
- Headquarters: Moscow
- President: Ilgar Mamedov
- Chairman: Alisher Usmanov

Official website
- www.rusfencing.ru
- Other key staff: Yelena Grishina, spokesperson
- (Russia)
- (Soviet Union)

The Russian Fencing Federation (RFF; Russian: Федерация Фехтования России (ФФР), romanized: Federatsiya Fekhtovaniya Rossii (FFR) is the governing body for the sport of fencing in Russia. It was created in 1992. FFR was formerly a member of the European Fencing Confederation, but its membership was suspended in 2023. It is a member of the Russian Olympic Committee.

== History ==
=== 1992–2019 ===
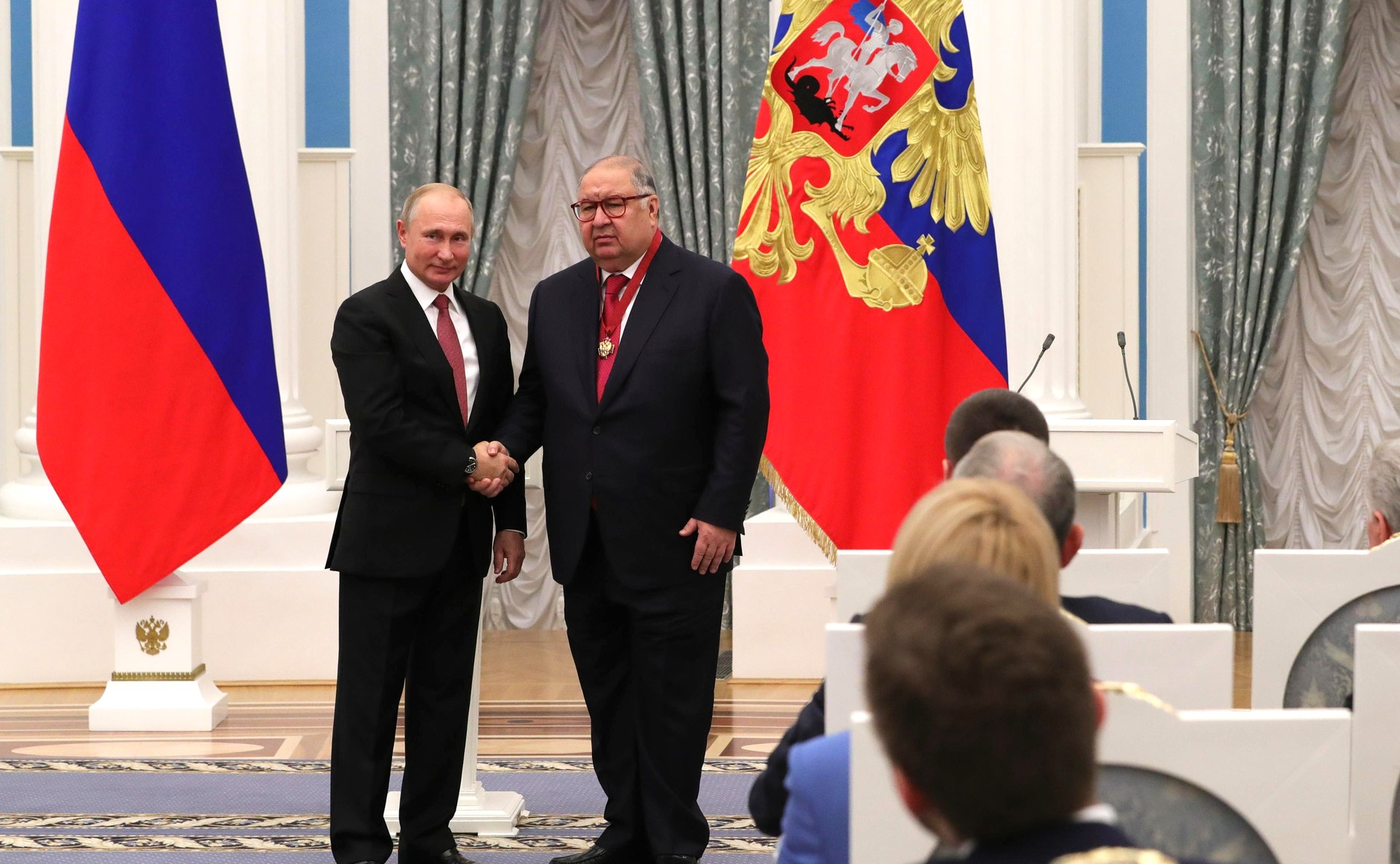
Russian Fencing Federation president Alisher Usmanov with Vladimir Putin.

The previous incarnation of Russian Fencing Federation was affiliated to the International Fencing Federation (FIE) in 1914. The modern FFR was created proper in 1992.

Russian oligarch Alisher Usmanov was president of the Russian Fencing Federation from 2001 to 2009 before being elected president of the FIE. He was concurrently president of the European Fencing Confederation from 2005 to 2009, and then president of the FIE from 2008 until 1 March 2022, when following the imposition of sanctions on him in reaction to the Russian invasion of Ukraine, Usmanov announced, in an accusatory letter, that he was stepping down.

=== 2019–present ===
In response to the Russian invasion of Ukraine in late February 2022, the FIE agreed with the European Fencing Confederation to ban Russian fencers, and reallocated competitions that were due to be held in Russia. On 10 March 2023, the FIE became the first Olympic governing body to officially reinstate some of the Russian and Belarusian athletes and officials, in time for the start of the qualification for the 2024 Summer Olympics.

In June 2022, Stanislav Pozdnyakov, the Russian Olympic Committee (ROC) President, was removed from his position as European Fencing Confederation (EFC) President at an Extraordinary Congress following a unanimous vote of no confidence in Pozdnyakov in March 2022, due to his xenophobic conduct in the wake of the Russian invasion of Ukraine.

In June 2023, the European Fencing Confederation banned all Russian fencers and officials from participating in its competitions, and suspended the membership in the EFC of the Russian Fencing Federation "in connection with the rough violation of the ethical principles of dignity, integrity, and relationships with countries, the rules of conduct, and the general principles of sports justice by the Russian Fencing Federation."

In reaction to the emigration to the United States in 2023 of Russian Olympians épée fencer Sergey Bida (a silver medal winner) and his wife épée fencer Violetta Khrapina Bida, joining two-time junior world sabre champion Konstantin Lokhanov as the second and third Russian Olympian fencers to emigrate to the United States after the Russian invasion of Ukraine, in July 2023 the Russian Fencing Federation announced its decision to fire Russian national épée team head coach Alexander Glazunov. Glazunov said "I don't know why I'm responsible. But it's okay, life goes on." In December 2023, Pravda reported that the Bidas were "put on wanted list for escaping to USA."

No Russian fencer participated in the 2024 Olympic Games in Paris.

== Notable staff ==
- Yelena Grishina (born 1968), Olympic fencer, Federation spokesperson
