= Tony Bartlett =

British fencer (born 1955)

Personal information
- Born: 14 August 1955 (age 70) London, England

Sport
- Sport: Fencing

Tony Bartlett (born 14 August 1955) is a British fencer. He competed in the team foil events at the 1988 and 1992 Summer Olympics.
