= Jesús Esperanza =

Spanish fencer

Personal information
- Born: 17 August 1960 (age 65) Madrid, Spain

Sport
- Sport: Fencing

Jesús Esperanza (born 17 August 1960) is a Spanish foil fencer. He competed at the 1980, 1988 and 1992 Summer Olympics.
