= Gábor Bujka =

Hungarian water polo player

Personal information
- Nationality: Hungarian
- Born: 18 April 1961 (age 63); Budapest, Hungary

Sport
- Sport: Water polo

Gábor Bujka (born 18 April 1961) is a Hungarian water polo player. He competed in the men's tournament at the 1988 Summer Olympics.
