= Valter Kalaus =

Hungarian swimmer

Personal information
- Nationality: Hungarian
- Born: 12 August 1970 (age 55) Budapest, Hungary

Sport
- Sport: Swimming
Medal record
Representing Hungary
Summer Universiade
| Bronze medal – third place | 1993 Buffalo | 400m freestyle |

Valter Kalaus (born 12 August 1970) is a Hungarian swimmer. He competed in three events at the 1988 Summer Olympics.
