= Lee Tai-chung =

Taiwanese fencer

Lee Tai-Chung
Personal information
- Born: 李台忠, Pinyin: Lǐ Tái-zhōng; 16 June 1959 (age 67)

Sport
- Sport: Fencing

Lee Tai-Chung (born 16 June 1959) is a Taiwanese former fencer. He competed in the individual foil and épée events at the 1984 Summer Olympics.
