= István Pintér (water polo) =

Hungarian water polo player (born 1961)

Personal information
- Nationality: Hungarian
- Born: 21 August 1961 (age 64) Szolnok, Hungary

Sport
- Sport: Water polo

István Pintér (born 21 August 1961) is a Hungarian water polo player. He competed in the men's tournament at the 1988 Summer Olympics.

He has been working for Basel's swimming Club SVB as a headcoach for the first team and various waterpolo youth teams. He played for SVB and won its only Swiss championship in 1994.
