= Per Täckenström =

Swedish fencer

Personal information
- Born: 4 April 1963 (age 63) Stockholm, Sweden

Sport
- Sport: Fencing

Per Täckenström (born 4 April 1963) is a Swedish fencer. He competed in the team foil event at the 1988 Summer Olympics.
