= Ahmed Mohamed (fencer) =

Egyptian fencer

Personal information
- Born: 1 March 1994 (age 32) Damietta
- Other interests: Actor

Sport
- Sport: Fencing

Ahmed Mohamed (born 1 March 1994) is an Egyptian actor and fencer. He competed in the individual foil event at the Olympics.
