= Vladimer Aptsiauri =

Soviet fencer (1962–2012)

Personal information
- Born: 4 February 1962 Kvemo Kartli, Georgian SSR, Soviet Union
- Died: 14 May 2012 (aged 50)

Sport
- Sport: Fencing
Medal record
Men's fencing
Representing Soviet Union
Olympic Games
Gold medal – first place	1988 Seoul	Foil, team

Vladimer Aptsiauri (4 February 1962 – 14 May 2012) was a Soviet fencer. He won a gold medal in the team foil event at the 1988 Summer Olympics.
