= Carwai Seto =

Canadian swimmer (born 1973)

Personal information
- Nationality: American
- Born: 2 April 1973 (age 53) Halifax, Nova Scotia, Canada
- Occupation: School Teacher
- Height: 170 cm (5 ft 7 in)
- Weight: 54 kg (119 lb) (Olympics)

Chinese name
- Traditional Chinese: 司徒加慧
- Hanyu Pinyin: Sītú Jiāhuì
- Yale Romanization: Sītòuh Gāwaih

Sport
- Sport: Swimming
- Strokes: breaststroke, Individual Medley, Freestyle
- Club: Halifax Aquatic Club Trojans (HAC)
- College team: Princeton University
- Coach: Gary MacDonald (HAC); Rob Orr, Susan Teeter (Princeton)

Carwai Seto (born 2 April 1973), also appearing as Car-wei Seto, is a Canadian-born breaststroke, freestyle and medley swimmer who competed for Princeton University and represented Taiwan in international competition. At only 15, she participated in five events for Taiwan at the 1988 Summer Olympics in Seoul, Korea, and during her career held Taiwanese records in both the 100 and 200 meter breaststroke.

After receiving a B.A. in Chemistry from Princeton, and completing a Masters in Education from Boston's Lesley University, she taught math and science at various elementary and middle schools in California, Maryland, and Massachusetts.

== Early life and swimming ==
Seto was born on April 2, 1973, and raised in Halifax, Nova Scotia, where she attended Queen Elizabeth High School, graduating in 1991. Her mother is Taiwanese, which made her eligible to compete for Taiwan.

She swam in her youth with the highly competitive Halifax Trojan Aquatic Club, where she was coached by fellow Nova Scotian Gary MacDonald. MacDonald coached the Halifax Trojan Aquatic Club from 1983-2004, and was a former Olympic silver medalist in the 4x100-meter Medley relay for Canada at the 1976 Montreal Olympics. Familiar with Car-wai's specialties of medley and freestyle swimming, MacDonald had excelled as a medley swimmer familiar with all four competitive swim strokes in his early years competing for Simon Fraser University.

== 1988 Seoul Olympics ==
At only 15, Seto represented Taiwan at the 1988 Summer Olympics, competing in the 4x100 meter freestyle relay where the team placed 15th with a time of 4:09.84. Competing in her specialty, she swam in the Olympic women's 100-meter breaststroke where she placed 32nd with a time of 1:15.47, and the women's 200 meter breaststroke where she placed 35th with a time of 2:42.31.

In other relay events, she swam in the women's 200 meter individual medley where she placed 28th with a time of 2:27.72, and the women's 4x100 meter medley relay where her Taiwanese team placed 16th overall with a time of 4:39.49.

=== Princeton University ===
After competing in the Olympics, Seto attended and competed in swimming for Princeton University, where she swam for Hall of Fame Coach Rob Orr and Women's coach Susan Teeter. Enrolling at Princeton in 1991, and graduating around 1995, she completed a B.A. in Chemistry. During her collegiate swimming career, she was the 100-yard breaststroke Ivy League champion in three years, with a 1:03.4 in 1992, a 1:03.10 in 1993, a 1:03.18 in 1994, and a 1:03.27 in 1995. A dominant team during Seto's collegiate career, Princeton had the best record among women's teams in the EISL/Ivy League in the years 1990, 1992, and 1995, and were runners-up in 1991 and 1994.

=== International competition highlights ===
Representing the Halifax Aquatic Club in her early career on December 1, 1989, Carwai swam a 1:11.35 for the 100-meter breaststroke, placing third and a 1:05.94 in the 100-meter IM placing fourth at the World Cup Short Course at the Centre Claud Robillard Pool in Montreal. Representing the Halifax club again on May 6-7, 1989, at the Atlantic Canada Cup Swim Meet, she won both the 100 and 200 breaststroke and the 400 meter Individual Medley in New Brunswick.

She swam in the 1990 Asian Games. She held the Taiwanese record of 2:38.93 in the 200 m breaststroke from 1989 until 2004, when it was broken by Lin Man-hsu. She later set the Taiwanese record of 1:13.33 in the 100 m breaststroke at the 1991 Pan Pacific Swimming Championships, which stood until 2005 when it was broken by Tong Yu-chia.

== Post-swimming career ==
She received a Master of Education from Lesley University in Boston, Massachusetts, and taught math and science at various elementary and middle schools in Massachusetts, Maryland, and California. In 2013, she joined the faculty of Black Pine Circle (Upper) School in Berkeley, California, where she taught math.
