= Kim Chen =

Taiwanese swimmer

Personal information
- Born: 11 May 1967 (age 59)

Chinese name
- Traditional Chinese: 陳園芬
- Hanyu Pinyin: Chén Yuánfēn

Sport
- Sport: Swimming

Kim Chen (born 11 May 1967) is a Taiwanese breaststroke and medley swimmer. She competed in five events at the 1988 Summer Olympics. At the time, she was a student at the University of California, Berkeley, where she was a member of the California Golden Bears women's swim team.
