= Anvar Ibragimov =

Soviet fencer (1965–2023)

Personal information
- Full name: Anvar Kamilevich Ibragimov
- Born: 27 November 1965 Ufa, Bashkir ASSR, Russian SFSR, USSR
- Died: 27 August 2023 (aged 57)

Sport
- Sport: Fencing
Medal record
Men's fencing
Representing Soviet Union
Olympic Games
Gold medal – first place	1988 Seoul	Team foil
World Championships
Bronze medal – third place	1985 Barcelona	Team foil
Summer Universiade
Silver medal – second place	1991 Sheffield	Team foil
Bronze medal – third place	1985 Kobe	Individual foil
Representing Russia
World Championships
Silver medal – second place	1995 The Hague	Team foil

Anvar Kamilevich Ibragimov (Russian: Анвар Камилевич Ибрагимов; 27 November 1965 – 27 August 2023) was a Soviet fencer of Tatar descent. He won a gold medal in the team foil event at the 1988 Summer Olympics in Seoul.

He was born in Ufa. He also won team foil gold for the Soviet Union in the 1984 Friendship Games, team foil bronze at the 1985 International Fencing Federation (FIE) World Championships, team foil bronze in the Universiade Games in 1985 and 1991, and team silver at the 1995 FIE World Championships as part of the Russian team.

Ibragimov died in August 2023, at the age of 57.
