= Matsuo Azuma =

Japanese fencer

Personal information
- Born: 23 May 1965 (age 61)

Sport
- Sport: Fencing

Matsuo Azuma (東 松生, Azuma Matsuo) (born 23 May 1965) is a Japanese fencer. He competed in the team foil event at the 1988 Summer Olympics.
