= Mihály Richárd Bodor =

Hungarian swimmer

Personal information
- Born: 4 March 1962 (age 64) Chicago, Illinois, United States

Sport
- Sport: Swimming

Mihály Richárd Bodor (born 4 March 1962) is a Hungarian swimmer. He competed in two events at the 1988 Summer Olympics.
