= Thomas Endres =

German fencer (born 1969)

Personal information
- Born: 12 September 1969 (age 56) Würzburg, West Germany

Sport
- Sport: Fencing
Medal record
Men's fencing
Representing West Germany
Olympic Games
Silver medal – second place	1988 Seoul	Foil, team

Thomas Endres (born 12 September 1969) is a German fencer. He won a silver medal in the team foil event at the 1988 Summer Olympics.
