= Norbert Ágh =

Hungarian swimmer

Personal information
- Born: 5 February 1970 (age 56) Dunaújváros, Hungary

Sport
- Sport: Swimming

Norbert Ágh (born 5 February 1970) is a Hungarian swimmer. He competed in two events at the 1988 Summer Olympics.
