= Alkindi (fencer) =

Indonesian fencer (born 1962)

Personal information
- Born: 6 April 1962 (age 64) Banda Aceh, Indonesia

Sport
- Sport: Fencing

Alkindi (born 6 April 1962) is an Indonesian fencer. He competed in the individual foil event at the 1988 Summer Olympics, losing all five of his bouts.
