= Lin Chun-hong =

Taiwanese swimmer

Personal information
- Full name: 林 俊宏, Pinyin: Lín Jùn-hóng
- Born: 13 November 1965 (age 60)

Sport
- Sport: Swimming

Lin Chun-hong (born 13 November 1965) is a Taiwanese swimmer. He competed in two events at the 1984 Summer Olympics.
