= Eric Strand =

Swedish fencer

Personal information
- Born: 20 January 1966 (age 60) Götaland, Sweden

Sport
- Sport: Fencing

Eric Strand (born 20 January 1966) is a Swedish fencer. He competed in the individual and team foil events at the 1988 Summer Olympics.
