= Liu Yunhong =

Chinese fencer

Personal information
- Full name: 劉 雲宏, Pinyin: Liú Yún-hóng
- Born: 13 January 1959 (age 67)

Sport
- Sport: Fencing

Liu Yunhong (born 13 January 1959) is a Chinese foil and sabre fencer. He competed at the 1984 and 1988 Summer Olympics.
