= Wang San-tsai =

Taiwanese fencer

Personal information
- Born: 14 January 1965 (age 61)

Sport
- Sport: Fencing

Wang San-tsai (Chinese: 王三財; pinyin: Wáng Sān-cái; born 14 January 1965) is a Taiwanese fencer. He competed in the individual foil and épée events at the 1988 Summer Olympics, placing 50th and 73rd, respectively. He temporarily withdrew from competition beginning in January 1989 after his doctors expressed concern that he might be suffering from deep-vein thrombosis.
