= Chang Hui-chien =

Taiwanese swimmer

Personal information
- Full name: 張 惠堅, Pinyin: Zhāng Huì-jiān
- Born: 18 September 1969 (age 56)

Sport
- Sport: Swimming

Chang Hui-chien (born 18 September 1969) is a Taiwanese butterfly, freestyle and medley swimmer. She competed at the 1984 Summer Olympics and the 1988 Summer Olympics.
