= Matthias Gey =

German fencer (born 1960)

Personal information
- Born: 7 July 1960 (age 65) Tauberbischofsheim, West Germany

Sport
- Sport: Fencing
Medal record
Men's fencing
Representing West Germany
Olympic Games
Silver medal – second place	1984 Los Angeles	Foil, team
Silver medal – second place	1988 Seoul	Foil, team

Matthias Gey (born 7 July 1960) is a German fencer. He won silver medals in the team foil events at the 1984 and 1988 Summer Olympics.
