= Luc Rocheleau =

Canadian fencer (born 1965)

Personal information
- Born: 4 March 1965 (age 60); Montreal, Quebec, Canada

Sport
- Sport: Fencing

Luc Rocheleau (born 4 March 1965) is a Canadian fencer. He competed in the individual and team foil events at the 1988 Summer Olympics.

He appeared in Tous pour un, un pour tous (All For One, and One For All) a 1993 National Film Board of Canada documentary about Quebec fencers trying to make the 1988 Canadian Olympic team, directed by Diane Létourneau.
