= Boris Koretsky =

Soviet fencer (born 1961)

Personal information
- Born: 1 January 1961 (age 65) Donetsk Oblast, Ukrainian SSR, Soviet Union

Sport
- Sport: Fencing
Medal record
Men's fencing
Representing Soviet Union
Olympic Games
Gold medal – first place	1988 Seoul	Foil, team

Boris Koretsky (born 1 January 1961) is a Soviet fencer. He won a gold medal in the team foil event at the 1988 Summer Olympics.
