= Ulrich Schreck =

German fencer

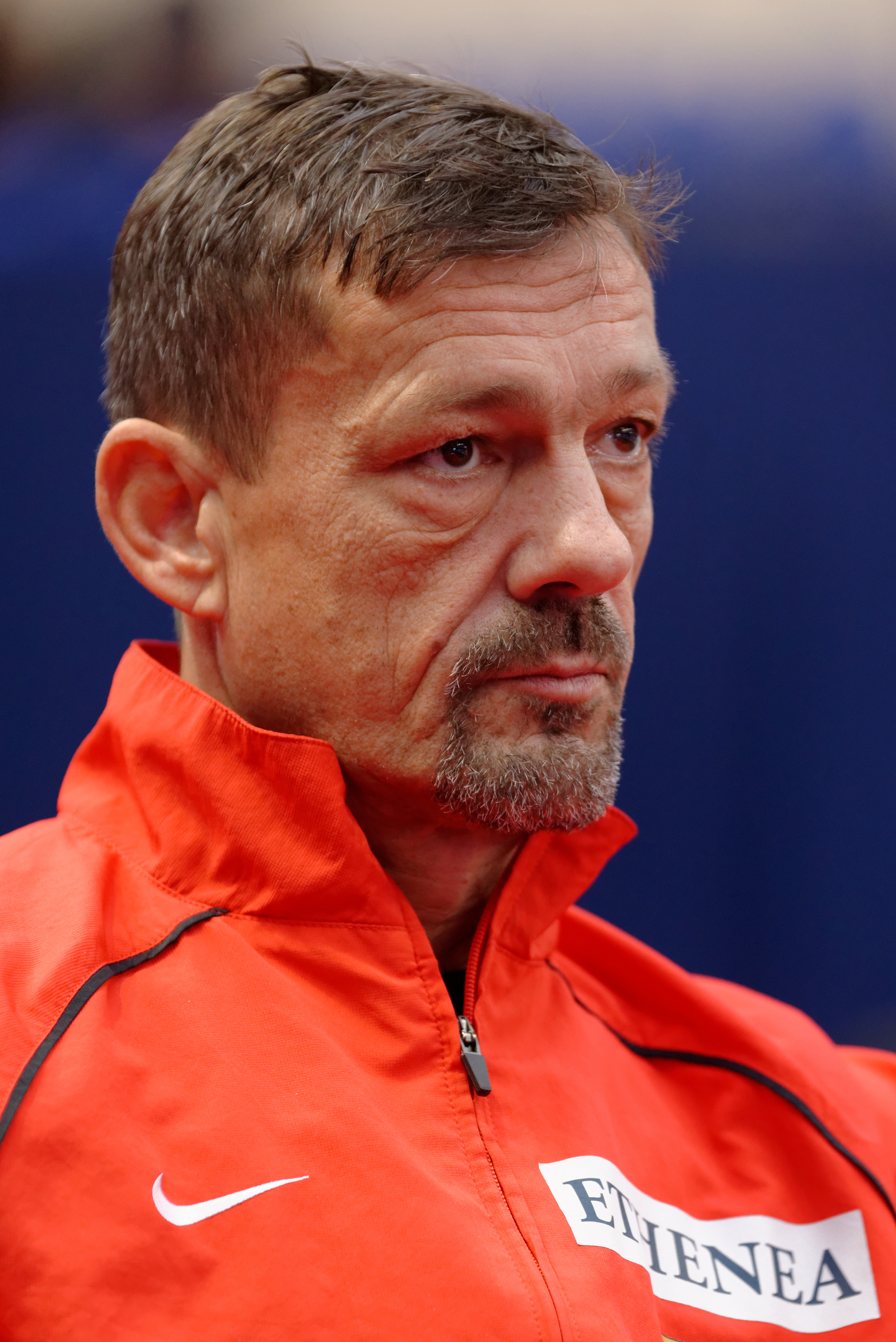

Personal information
- Born: 11 March 1962 (age 64) Tauberbischofsheim, Baden-Württemberg, West Germany
- Height: 1.88 m (6 ft 2 in)
- Weight: 80 kg (176 lb)

Fencing career
- Sport: Fencing
- Weapon: foil
- Hand: right-handed
Medal record
Men's foil
Olympic Games
Representing West Germany
Silver medal – second place	1988 Seoul	Team
Representing Germany
Gold medal – first place	1992 Barcelona	Team

Ulrich Schreck (born 11 March 1962) is a German fencer. He won a silver medal in the team foil event at the 1988 Summer Olympics and a gold in the same event at the 1992 Summer Olympics.

He is now federal coach to the Germany men's foil team.
