= Ola Kajbjer =

Swedish fencer

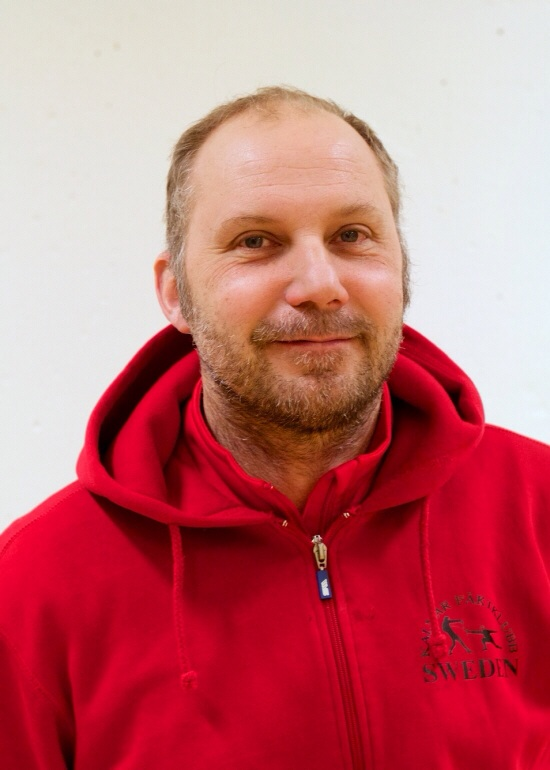
- Kajbjer in 2013

Personal information
- Full name: Ola Karl Kajbjer
- Nationality: Swedish
- Born: 28 March 1969 (age 57) Burlöv, Sweden

Sport
- Sport: Fencing
- Club: Kalmar Fäktklubb.
- Team: Kalmar Fäktklubb.
- Turned pro: 1988
- Retired: 1996
- Now coaching: Kalmar fäktklubb.

Achievements and titles
- Olympic finals: 1992 Barcelona, 1988 Seoul

Ola Kajbjer (born 28 March 1969) is a Swedish fencer. He competed in the foil events at the 1988 and 1992 Summer Olympics.
