= Yan Wing-shean =

Taiwanese fencer

Personal information
- Born: 20 June 1966 (age 60)

Sport
- Sport: Fencing

Yan Wing-shean (Chinese: 鄭明祥; pinyin: Zhèng Míng-xiáng; born 20 June 1966) is a Taiwanese fencer. He competed in the individual foil and sabre events at the 1988 Summer Olympics.
