= Weng Tak Fung =

Hong Kong fencer

Personal information
- Born: 22 December 1962 (age 63)

Sport
- Sport: Fencing

Weng Tak Fung (born 22 December 1962) is a Hong Kong fencer. He competed in the individual and team foil events at the 1988 Summer Olympics.
