= Donnie McKenzie =

British fencer (born 1960)

Personal information
- Born: 3 June 1960 (age 66) Edinburgh, Scotland

Sport
- Sport: Fencing

Donald Alan McKenzie (born 3 June 1960) is a British fencer. He competed in the individual and team foil events at the 1988 and 1992 Summer Olympics. In 1989, he won the foil title at the British Fencing Championships.
