= Benoît Giasson =

Canadian fencer (born 1964)

Personal information
- Born: 4 December 1964 (age 61) Montreal, Quebec, Canada

Sport
- Sport: Fencing
Medal record
Representing Canada
Pan American Games
Silver medal – second place	1987 Indianapolis	Team foil
Bronze medal – third place	1991 Havana	Team foil

Benoît Giasson (born 4 December 1964) is a Canadian fencer. He competed in the foil events at the 1988 and 1992 Summer Olympics.
