= Dave Littell =

American fencer

Personal information
- Born: October 25, 1953 (age 72)

Sport
- Country: United States
- Sport: Fencing
- Event: Foil
- College team: Illinois

Dave Littell (born October 25, 1953) is an American fencer. In 1972 he was an All American for Illinois. He was the Big Ten Foil Champion in 1974, and a member of the 1987 US Pan American Team. He competed in the individual and team foil events at the 1988 Summer Olympics.
