= Zhang Zhicheng =

Chinese fencer

Personal information
- Born: 1 July 1963 (age 63)

Sport
- Sport: Fencing

Zhang Zhicheng (born 1 July 1963) is a Chinese retired fencer. He competed in the individual and team foil events at the 1988 Summer Olympics.
