= Ilgar Mammadov (fencer) =

Russian fencer (born 1965)

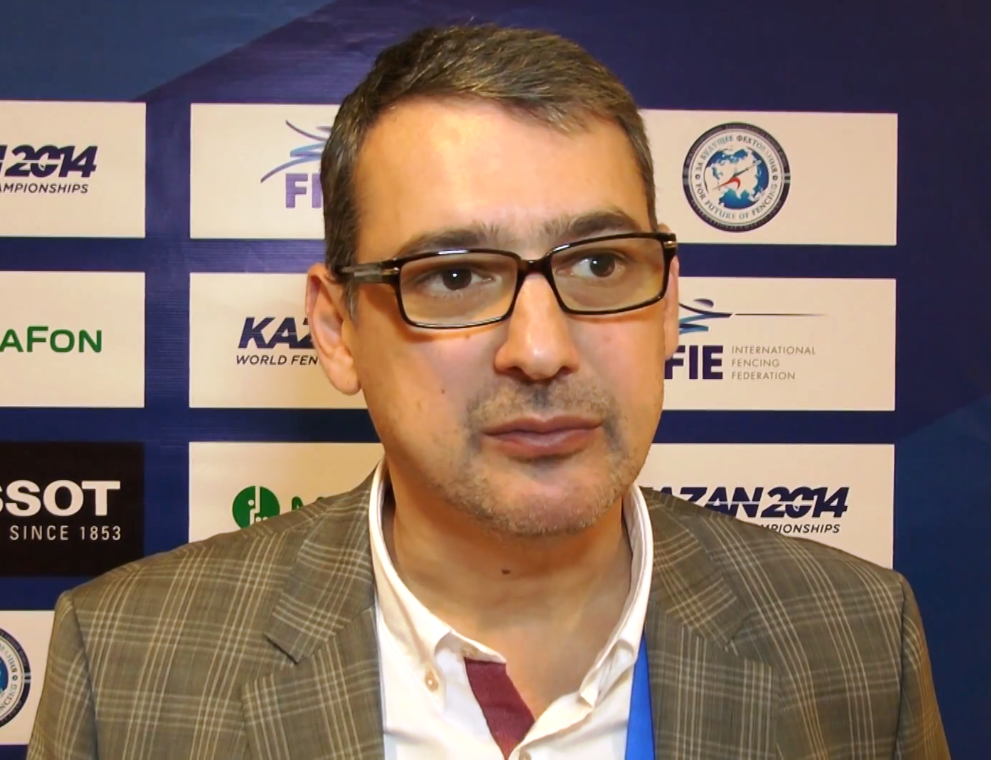
- Mamedov in 2014

Personal information
- Born: 15 November 1965 (age 60) Baku, Azerbaijan SSR, Soviet Union
- Height: 1.83 m (6 ft 0 in)
- Weight: 83 kg (183 lb)

Fencing career
- Sport: Fencing
- Weapon: Foil
- Hand: Right-handed
- Club: CSKA Moscow
Medal record
Men's foil fencing
Representing Soviet Union
Olympic Games
Gold medal – first place	1988 Seoul	Team foil
World Championships
Gold medal – first place	1989 Denver	Team foil
Representing Russia
Olympic Games
Gold medal – first place	1996 Atlanta	Team foil
World Championships
Silver medal – second place	1995 The Hague	Team foil

Ilgar Yasharovich Mammadov (also spelled Mamedov, Russian: Ильгар Яшарович Мамедов, Azerbaijani: İlqar Yaşar oğlu Məmmədov; born 15 November 1965 in Baku, Azerbaijan SSR) is a Soviet and Russian of Azerbaijani origin who serves as President of the Russian Fencing Federation, and a former fencer . He is a two-time Olympic and one time world champion in team foil.

== Early life ==
Mammadov graduated from the Baku State University. He married World and European champion fencer Yelena Jemayeva. They live in Moscow and have two daughters: Milena and Ayla.

== Career ==
=== Fencer ===
He competed in four Olympic Games in 1988–2000, Mammadov won two Olympic gold medals in the team foil competition, at the 1988 Summer Olympics in Seoul and at the 1996 Summer Olympics in Atlanta.

=== Coach and referee ===
After retiring from competition, Mammadov became a fencing master and referee. In 2008, he became the Russian representative to the Refereeing Commission of the International Fencing Federation (FIE). In 2013, he was inducted into the FIE's Hall of Fame.

=== Russian Fencing Federation president ===
He was appointed director of fencing in the Russian Fencing Federation after Vladislav Pavlovich's resignation following the 2012 Summer Olympics. He serves as president of the Russian Fencing Federation

In 2023, Mammadov lashed out at the International Olympic Committee's (IOC) proposal to allow Russian athletes to enter international competition only if they satisfied two conditions, following their suspension a year earlier due to the Russian invasion of Ukraine, considering any restrictions unfair and humiliating. On 28 March 2023 the executive committee of the IOC recommended that the Russians be allowed to participate in a neutral status if the athletes: a) do not actively support the war; and b) are not members of Russian law enforcement or armed forces. He said that all of the country's leading fencers are in the Russian army or law enforcement agencies.

With these conditions of the IOC, there's no hope of going to the Paris Olympics. You need to sell your soul to the devil and go to Paris, or remain a normal person.

Even if the World Cup competitions are transferred from countries that refuse to organize tournaments [because of Russia's participation], we still will not be able to get to these places.

The conditions of our admission are such that they are simply unacceptable.

He also commented on the French federation's decision to bar Russian fencers from attending the World Cup event in France:

They forgot to mention in their announcement that the real reasons behind this is [their] fear of us and concern that if we return, the French will lose to us again! Apparently, [they] erased this part because their hands were trembling. France surprised [us], of course. I think it's more of a sporting decision than a political one. They really do not need us as competitors, they constantly lose to us. Look at the Olympics in Rio and Tokyo, they lost almost everything to us.

In reaction to the emigration to the United States in 2023 of Russian Olympians Sergey Bida (a silver medal winner) and his wife Violetta Khrapina Bida, joining two-time junior world sabre champion Konstantin Lokhanov as the second and third Russian Olympian fencers to emigrate to the United States after the Russian invasion of Ukraine, the Russian Fencing Federation announced its decision to fire Russian national épée team head coach Alexander Glazunov. Glazunov, when he was then interviewed about the development, said to RBC Sport: "Ask the president of the federation [Ilgar] Mammadov – he fired me, not me."

On 25 January 2025, he was re-elected as the president of the Russian Fencing Federation.
