= Lee Chung Man =

Hong Kong fencer

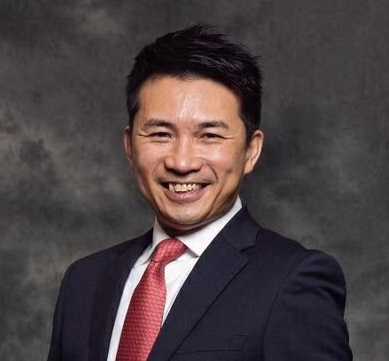

Personal information
- Born: 20 November 1967 (age 58)

Sport
- Sport: Fencing

Lee Chung Man (Chinese: 李忠民; Jyutping: lei^{5} zung^{1} man^{4}; born 20 November 1967) is a Hong Kong fencer. He competed in the individual and team foil events at the 1988 Summer Olympics.
