= Jens Howe =

German fencer (born 1961)

Personal information
- Born: 17 February 1961 (age 65) Oschatz, Bezirk Leipzig, East Germany

Sport
- Sport: Fencing

Jens Howe (born 17 February 1961) is a German fencer. He competed in the individual and team foil events for East Germany at the 1988 Summer Olympics.
