= Leszek Bandach =

Polish fencer

Personal information
- Born: 3 June 1960 (age 66) Zielona Góra, Poland

Sport
- Sport: Fencing

Leszek Bandach (born 3 June 1960) is a Polish fencer. He competed in the individual and team foil events at the 1988 Summer Olympics.
