= Peter Åkerberg =

Swedish fencer

Personal information
- Born: 6 July 1960 (age 65) Stockholm, Sweden

Sport
- Sport: Fencing

Peter Dag Torsten Åkerberg (born 6 July 1960) is a Swedish fencer. He competed in the team foil event at the 1988 Summer Olympics.
