= Wu Ming-hsun =

Taiwanese swimmer

Personal information
- Full name: 吳 明勳, Pinyin: Wú Míng-xūn
- Born: 15 June 1968 (age 58)

Sport
- Sport: Swimming

Wu Ming-hsun (born 15 June 1968) is a Taiwanese swimmer. He competed at the 1984 Summer Olympics and the 1988 Summer Olympics.
