= Chen Kung-Liang =

Taiwanese modern pentathlete

Personal information
- Born: 陳功亮, Pinyin: Chén Gōng-liàng; 6 March 1964 (age 62)

Sport
- Sport: Modern pentathlon

Chen Kung-Liang (born 6 March 1964) is a Taiwanese modern pentathlete. He competed at the 1984 Summer Olympics, finishing in 48th place in the individual event.
