= Stephen Angers =

Canadian fencer (born 1965)

Personal information
- Born: 29 April 1965 (age 61) Montreal, Quebec, Canada

Sport
- Sport: Fencing

Stephen Angers (born 29 April 1965) is a Canadian fencer. He competed in the individual and team foil events at the 1988 Summer Olympics.
