= Pierre Harper =

British fencer (born 1957)

Personal information
- Born: 2 March 1957 (age 69) London, England

Sport
- Sport: Fencing

Pierre A Harper (born 2 March 1957) is a British fencer. He competed in the individual and team foil events at the 1980, 1984 and 1988 Summer Olympics. He was a six times British fencing champion, winning six foil titles at the British Fencing Championships, from 1978 to 1988.
