= Laurent Bel =

French fencer

Personal information
- Born: 25 January 1966 (age 60) Neuilly-sur-Seine, France

Sport
- Sport: Fencing

Laurent Bel (born 25 January 1966) is a French fencer. He competed in the individual and team foil events at the 1988 Summer Olympics.
