= Aris Enkelmann =

German fencer

Personal information
- Born: 29 April 1964 (age 62) Frankfurt (Oder), East Germany

Sport
- Sport: Fencing

Aris Enkelmann (born 29 April 1964) is a German fencer. He competed in the individual and team foil events for East Germany at the 1988 Summer Olympics.
