= Michael Marx =

American fencer

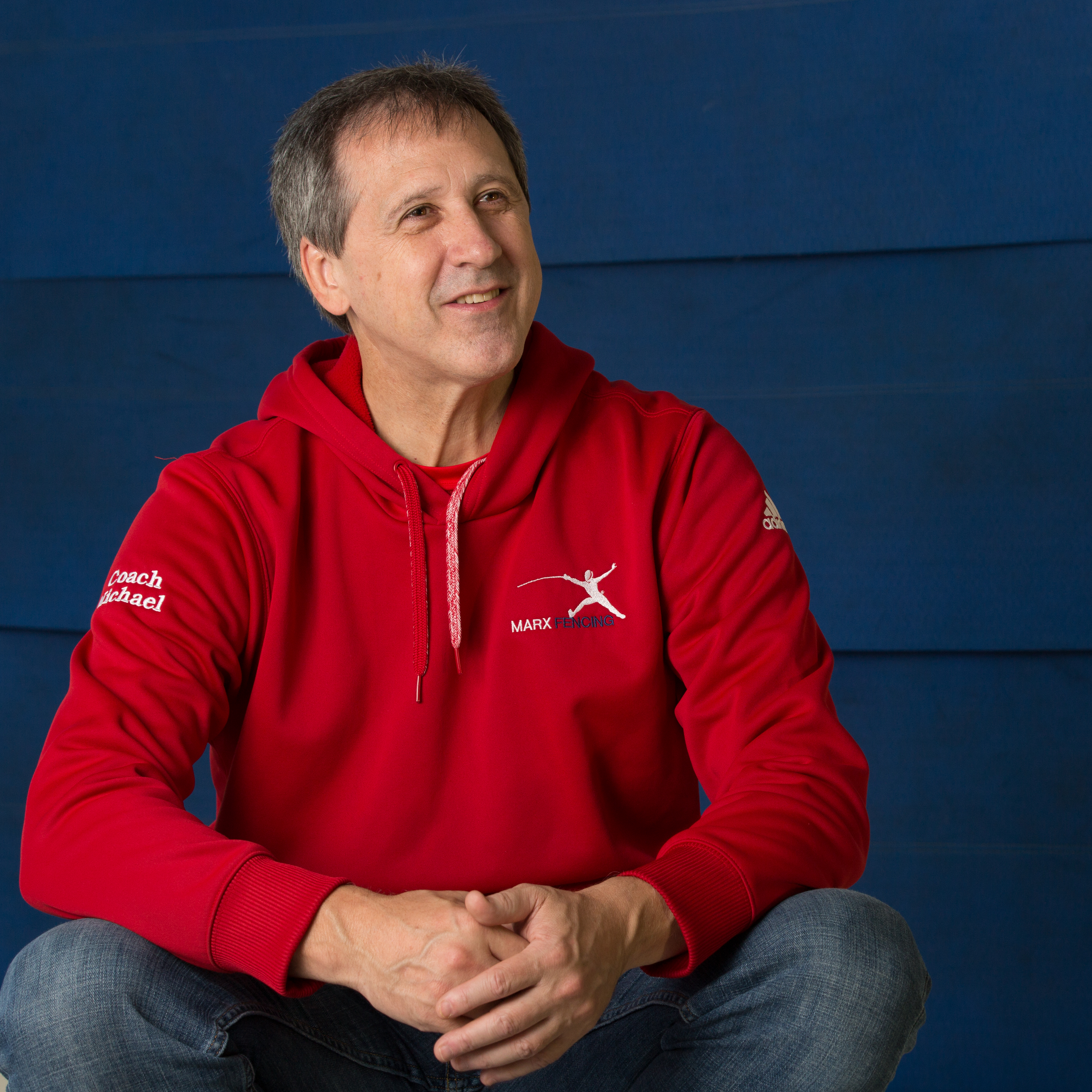
- 5-time Olympian Michael Marx, 2016

Personal information
- Nationality: American
- Born: July 7, 1958 (age 68) Portland, Oregon, U.S.
- Website: marxfencingacademy.com

Sport
- Country: USA
- Sport: Fencing
Medal record
Men's fencing
Representing United States
Pan American Games
Silver medal – second place	1979 San Juan	Team foil
Silver medal – second place	1983 Caracas	Team foil
Bronze medal – third place	1987 Indianapolis	Individual foil
Bronze medal – third place	1987 Indianapolis	Team foil
Summer Universiade
Silver medal – second place	1985 Kobe	Individual foil

Michael Anthony Marx (born July 7, 1958) is an American foil and epee fencer and fencing master. He is the brother of Robert Marx, who has also represented the U.S. in multiple Olympic fencing events. Michael and his brother were taught to fence by their mother, fencing coach Colleen Olney, who is considered by many prominent fencers to be "the mother of fencing in Oregon".

== Fencing career ==
Marx won a silver medal in foil at the 1985 Summer Universiade. He is an 8-time United States national men's foil champion (1977, 1979, 1982, 1985, 1986, 1987, 1990, and 1993). He is also a five-time Olympian in both foil and epee (1980, 1984, 1988, 1992, and 1996). Although Marx qualified for the 1980 Olympic team he did not compete due to the Olympic Committee's boycott of the 1980 Summer Olympics in Moscow, Russia. He was one of 461 athletes to receive a Congressional Gold Medal instead. Marx won the silver medal in team foil at the Pan American Games in 1979 and 1983, and the bronze in 1987. He won the bronze medal in individual foil in 1987.

== USFA ==
He served as Vice President of the United States Fencing Association (USFA) from 1992 to 1996. He is a staff member of the USFA Coaches College.

== Coaching career ==
Marx received his Master of Arms degree in Poland in 1993 after spending several months studying under Prof. Zbigniew Czajkowski at the Academy of Physical Education in Katowice. In recent years he has served as the U.S. national women's épée coach, and his students have included U.S. Team member Cody Mattern.

Marx was fencing master at Northwest Fencing Center in Beaverton, Oregon, until 2008 when he accepted a position as full-time assistant coach at Duke University in North Carolina. Marx returned to Northwest Fencing Center after a year as a coach at Duke University. Since January 2010 he has been Director of Fencing Operations at the Boston Fencing Club.

In July 2014, Marx founded Marx Fencing Academy, located in Acton, Massachusetts.

== Awards ==
Marx was inducted into the USFA Hall of Fame in 1997. In 2003, Marx was inducted into the Oregon Sports Hall of Fame, the first fencer to be so honored. Marx is also a 5-time USOC Athlete of the Year. In 2007, he was named Developmental Coach of the Year by the USFA.

== See also ==
- List of USFA Division I National Champions
- List of USFA Hall of Fame members
