= George Nonomura =

American fencer

Personal information
- Born: February 5, 1958 (age 68) San Francisco, California, U.S.

Sport
- Sport: Fencing

George Nonomura (born February 5, 1958) is an American fencer. He competed in the team foil event at the 1988 Summer Olympics.
