= Yoshihiko Kanatsu =

Japanese fencer (born 1961)

Personal information
- Born: 2 June 1961 (age 65)

Sport
- Sport: Fencing

Yoshihiko Kanatsu (金津 義彦, Kanatsu Yoshihiko) (born 2 June 1961) is a Japanese fencer. He competed in the foil events at the 1984 and 1988 Summer Olympics.
