= Thomas Åkerberg =

Swedish fencer

Personal information
- Born: 28 May 1959 (age 67) Stockholm, Sweden

Sport
- Sport: Fencing

Thomas Carl Torsten Åkerberg (born 28 May 1959) is a Swedish fencer. He competed in the individual and team foil events at the 1988 Summer Olympics.
