= Róbert Gátai =

Hungarian fencer (born 1964)

Personal information
- Born: 26 May 1964 (age 62) Budapest, Hungary

Sport
- Sport: Fencing
Medal record
Men's fencing
Representing Hungary
Olympic Games
Bronze medal – third place	1988 Seoul	Foil, team
Hungarian Fencing Championships
Silver medal – second place	2016 Budapest	Individual foil

Róbert Gátai at the 2013 World Fencing Championships in Budapest, 12 August 2023.

Róbert Gátai (born 26 May 1964) is a Hungarian fencer. He won a bronze medal in the team foil event at the 1988 Summer Olympics.
