= Zsolt Érsek =

Hungarian fencer (born 1966)

Personal information
- Born: 13 June 1966 (age 60) Budapest, Hungary

Sport
- Sport: Fencing
Medal record
Men's fencing
Representing Hungary
Olympic Games
Bronze medal – third place	1988 Seoul	Team foil
World Championships
Bronze medal – third place	1987 Lausanne	Team foil
Summer Universiade
Gold medal – first place	1985 Kobe	Team foil
Gold medal – first place	1987 Zagreb	Individual foil
Silver medal – second place	1989 Duisburg	Individual foil
Silver medal – second place	1989 Duisburg	Team foil

Zsolt Érsek (born 13 June 1966) is a Hungarian fencer. He won a bronze medal in the team foil event at the 1988 Summer Olympics.
