= Udo Wagner =

German fencer

Personal information
- Born: 2 November 1963 (age 62) Bautzen, Bezirk Dresden, East Germany

Sport
- Sport: Fencing
Medal record
Men's fencing
Olympic Games
Representing East Germany
| Silver medal – second place | 1988 Seoul | Foil, individual |
Representing Germany
| Gold medal – first place | 1992 Barcelona | Foil, team |

Udo Wagner (born 2 November 1963) is a German former fencer. He won a silver medal in the individual foil event for East Germany at the 1988 Summer Olympics. Four years later, he won a gold in the team foil event for Germany at the 1992 Summer Olympics.
