= Peter Lewison =

American fencer

Personal information
- Born: December 7, 1961 (age 64) Port of Spain, Trinidad and Tobago

Sport
- Sport: Fencing

Peter Lewison (born December 7, 1961) is an American fencer. He competed in the individual and team foil events at the 1984 and 1988 Summer Olympics.
