= West Germany at the 1988 Summer Olympics =

- Flag of Germany
- IOC code: FRG
- NOC: National Olympic Committee for Germany

in Seoul
- Competitors: 347 (244 men, 103 women) in 24 sports
- Flag bearer: Reiner Klimke (equestrianism)
- Medals Ranked 5th: Gold 11 Silver 14 Bronze 15 Total 40

Summer Olympics appearances (overview)
- 1968; 1972; 1976; 1980; 1984; 1988

Other related appearances
- Germany (1896–1936, 1952, 1992–pres.); Saar (1952); United Team of Germany (1956–1964)

West Germany (Federal Republic of Germany) competed at the Olympic Games for the last time as an independent nation at the 1988 Summer Olympics in Seoul, South Korea. Following German reunification in 1990, a single German team competed in the 1992 Summer Olympics. 347 competitors, 244 men and 103 women, took part in 194 events in 24 sports.

== Medalists ==
Medal	Name	Sport	Event	Date
Gold	Silvia Sperber	Shooting	Women's 50 metre rifle three positions	21 September
Gold	Matthias Baumann; Ralf Ehrenbrink; Claus Erhorn; Thies Kaspareit	Equestrian	Team eventing	22 September
Gold	Anja Fichtel	Fencing	Women's foil	22 September
Gold	Arnd Schmitt	Fencing	Men's épée	24 September
Gold	Michael Groß	Swimming	Men's 200 metre butterfly	24 September
Gold	Thomas Domian; Armin Eichholz; Manfred Klein; Wolfgang Maennig; Matthias Mellinghaus; Thomas Möllenkamp; Bahne Rabe; Eckhardt Schultz; Ansgar Wessling	Rowing	Men's eight	25 September
Gold	Reiner Klimke; Ann-Kathrin Linsenhoff; Monica Theodorescu; Nicole Uphoff	Equestrian	Team dressage	25 September
Gold	Nicole Uphoff	Equestrian	Individual dressage	27 September
Gold	Ludger Beerbaum; Wolfgang Brinkmann; Dirk Hafemeister; Franke Sloothaak	Equestrian	Team jumping	28 September
Gold	Sabine Bau; Anja Fichtel; Zita Funkenhauser; Annette Klug; Christiane Weber	Fencing	Women's team foil	28 September
Gold	Steffi Graf	Tennis	Women's singles	1 October
Silver	Silvia Sperber	Shooting	Women's 10 metre air rifle	18 September
Silver	Gerhard Himmel	Wrestling	Men's Greco-Roman 100 kg	21 September
Silver	Sabine Bau	Fencing	Women's foil	22 September
Silver	Peter-Michael Kolbe	Rowing	Men's single sculls	24 September
Silver	Stefan Pfeiffer	Swimming	Men's 1500 metre freestyle	25 September
Silver	Jutta Niehaus	Cycling	Men's individual road race	26 September
Silver	Bernd Gröne	Cycling	Men's individual road race	27 September
Silver	Matthias Behr; Thomas Endres; Mathias Gey; Ulrich Schreck; Thorsten Weidner	Fencing	Men's team foil	27 September
Silver	Frank Wieneke	Judo	Men's 78 kg	28 September
Silver	Manfred Nerlinger	Weightlifting	Men's +110 kg	29 September
Silver	Elmar Borrmann; Volker Fischer; Thomas Gerull; Alexander Pusch; Arnd Schmitt	Fencing	Men's team épée	30 September
Silver	Marc Meiling	Judo	Men's 95 kg	30 September
Silver	Dieter Baumann	Athletics	Men's 5000 metres	1 October
Silver	West Germany men's national field hockey team: Christian Schliemann; Tobias Frank; Ulrich Hänel; Carsten Fischer; Andreas Mollandin; Ekkhard Schmidt-Opper; Dirk Brinkmann; Heiner Dopp; Stefan Blöcher; Andreas Keller; Thomas Reck; Thomas Brinkmann; Hanns-Henning Fastrich; Michael Hilgers; Volker Fried; Michael Metz	Field hockey	Men's tournament	1 October
Bronze	Johann Riederer	Shooting	Men's 10 metre air rifle	20 September
Bronze	Robert Lechner	Cycling	Men's track time trial	20 September
Bronze	Thomas Fahrner; Michael Groß; Rainer Henkel; Erik Hochstein; Stefan Pfeiffer; Peter Sitt	Swimming	Men's 4 × 200 metre freestyle relay	21 September
Bronze	Zita Funkenhauser	Fencing	Women's foil	22 September
Bronze	Guido Grabow; Volker Grabow; Norbert Keßlau; Jörg Puttlitz	Rowing	Men's coxless four	25 September
Bronze	Peter Immesberger	Weightlifting	Men's 100 kg	26 September
Bronze	Christian Henn	Cycling	Men's individual road race	27 September
Bronze	Steffi Graf; Claudia Kohde-Kilsch	Tennis	Women's doubles	28 September
Bronze	Martin Zawieja	Weightlifting	Men's +110 kg	29 September
Bronze	Reiner Gies	Boxing	Light welterweight	29 September
Bronze	Claudia Zaczkiewicz	Athletics	Women's 100 metres hurdles	30 September
Bronze	West Germany Olympic football team: Michael Schulz; Armin Görtz; Wolfgang Funkel; Thomas Hörster; Olaf Janßen; Rudi Bommer; Holger Fach; Jürgen Klinsmann; Wolfram Wuttke; Frank Mill; Uwe Kamps; Roland Grahammer; Thomas Häßler; Christian Schreier; Fritz Walter; Ralf Sievers; Gerhard Kleppinger; Karl-Heinz Riedle	Football	Men's tournament	30 September
Bronze	Rolf Danneberg	Athletics	Men's discus throw	1 October
Bronze	Norbert Dobeleit; Mark Henrich; Edgar Itt; Bodo Kuhn; Ralf Lübke; Jörg Vaihinger	Athletics	Men's 4 × 400 metres relay	1 October
Bronze	Karsten Huck	Equestrian	Individual jumping	2 October

== Competitors ==
The following is the list of number of competitors in the Games.

Sport	Men	Women	Total
Archery	3	3	6
Athletics	25	22	47
Boxing	6	–	6
Canoeing	11	4	15
Cycling	12	3	15
Diving	2	4	6
Equestrian	9	3	12
Fencing	15	5	20
Field hockey	16	15	31
Football	18	–	18
Gymnastics	6	4	10
Judo	7	–	7
Modern pentathlon	3	–	3
Rowing	27	9	36
Sailing	13	2	15
Shooting	11	8	19
Swimming	17	13	30
Synchronized swimming	–	3	3
Table tennis	4	2	6
Tennis	2	3	5
Water polo	13	–	13
Weightlifting	7	–	7
Wrestling	17	–	17
Total	244	103	347

== Archery ==
In West Germany's fourth archery competition, the six archers were not as successful as the German team had been four years earlier, but nevertheless qualified two individuals for the semifinals and ended up with 6th places in both the women's team and women's individual events.

Men

Athlete	Event	Ranking round		Round 1		Quarterfinals		Semifinals		Final	
Athlete	Event	Score	Rank	Score	Rank	Score	Rank	Score	Rank	Score	Rank
Manfred Barth	Individual	1206	54	Did not advance							
Detlef Kahlert	Individual	1254	20 Q	307	17 Q	321	8 Q	311	12	Did not advance	
Bernhard Schulkowski	Individual	1199	59	Did not advance							
Manfred Barth; Detlef Kahlert; Bernhard Schulkowski	Team	3659	18	—N/a				Did not advance			

Women

Athlete	Event	Ranking round		Round 1		Quarterfinals		Semifinals		Final	
Athlete	Event	Score	Rank	Score	Rank	Score	Rank	Score	Rank	Score	Rank
Doris Haas	Individual	1222	32	Did not advance							
Claudia Kriz	Individual	1250	17 Q	311	11 Q	322	8 Q	326	8 Q	318	6
Christa Öckl	Individual	1230	25	Did not advance							
Doris Haas; Claudia Kriz; Christa Öckl	Team	3702	6 Q	—N/a				953	6 Q	931	6

== Athletics ==
Men
Track and road events

Athlete	Event	Heat Round 1		Heat Round 2		Semifinal		Final	
Athlete	Event	Time	Rank	Time	Rank	Time	Rank	Time	Rank
Christian Haas	100 metres	10.54	38 q	10.57	34	Did not advance			
Norbert Dobeleit	200 metres	20.86	12 q	20.98	23	Did not advance			
Ralf Lübke	200 metres	20.81	10 Q	20.80	15 Q	21.23	16	Did not advance	
Peter Braun	800 metres	1:47.32	11 Q	1:46.86	15 Q	1:47.43	16	Did not advance	
Dieter Baumann	5000 metres	13:58.46	29 Q	—N/a		13:22.71	3 Q	13:15.52	2nd place, silver medalist(s)
Ralf Salzmann	Marathon	—N/a						2:16:54	23
Florian Schwarthoff	110 metres hurdles	14.13	24 Q	13.67	17	Did not advance			
Edgar Itt	400 metres hurdles	50.10	12 Q	—N/a		48.86	6 Q	48.78	8
Harald Schmid	400 metres hurdles	49.77	9 Q	—N/a		48.93	7 Q	48.76	7
Jens Volkmann	3000 metres steeplechase	8:36.37	12 Q	—N/a		8:25.19	16	Did not advance	
Fritz Heer; Christian Haas; Peter Klein; Dirk Schweisfurth	4 × 100 metres relay	39.01	3 Q	—N/a		38.75	6 Q	38.55	6
Norbert Dobeleit; Edgar Itt; Jörg Vaihinger; Ralf Lübke; Mark Henrich (*); Bodo Kuhn (*)	4 × 400 metres relay	3:03.90	2 Q	—N/a		3:00.66	2 Q	3:00.56	3rd place, bronze medalist(s)

Field events

Athlete	Event	Qualification		Final	
Athlete	Event	Distance	Position	Distance	Position
Dietmar Mögenburg	High jump	2.28	1 Q	2.34	6
Carlo Thränhardt	High jump	2.25	13 q	2.31	7
Wulf Brunner	Discus throw	57.50	22	Did not advance	
Rolf Danneberg	Discus throw	65.70	1 Q	67.38	3rd place, bronze medalist(s)
Alois Hannecker	Discus throw	61.44	11 q	63.28	8
Christoph Sahner	Hammer throw	75.84	13	Did not advance	
Heinz Weis	Hammer throw	77.24	7 Q	79.16	5
Klaus Tafelmeier	Javelin throw	80.52	5 Q	82.72	4

Combined events – Decathlon

Athlete	Event	100 m	LJ	SP	HJ	400 m	110H	DT	PV	JT	1500 m	Final	Rank
Jürgen Hingsen	Result	DQ	DNF										
Jürgen Hingsen	Points	0	DNF										

Women
Track and road events

Athlete	Event	Heat Round 1		Heat Round 2		Semifinal		Final	
Athlete	Event	Time	Rank	Time	Rank	Time	Rank	Time	Rank
Sabine Richter	100 metres	11.49	24 q	11.59	28	Did not advance			
Ulrike Sarvari	100 metres	11.26	15 Q	11.16	15 Q	11.12	9	Did not advance	
Andrea Thomas	100 metres	11.46	23 q	11.37	22	Did not advance			
Karin Janke	200 metres	23.83	32 Q	23.87	30	Did not advance			
Silke Knoll	200 metres	23.51	24 Q	23.15	19	Did not advance			
Andrea Thomas	200 metres	22.92	7 Q	22.84	10 Q	22.91	13	Did not advance	
Helga Arendt	400 metres	52.69	14 Q	52.08	15 Q	50.36	8 Q	51.17	7
Ute Thimm	400 metres	52.79	16 Q	51.18	5 Q	50.28	10	Did not advance	
Gabriela Lesch	800 metres	2:00.95	3 Q	—N/a		1:59.85	9	Did not advance	
Vera Michallek	1500 metres	4:10.05	18	—N/a				Did not advance	
Vera Michallek	3000 metres	8:51.34	16	—N/a				Did not advance	
Kerstin Preßler	10,000 metres	DNS		—N/a				Did not advance	
Kerstin Preßler	Marathon	—N/a						2:34:26	21
Gabriela Wolf	Marathon	—N/a						2:35:11	27
Claudia Zaczkiewicz	100 metres hurdles	13.00	6 Q	12.87	5 Q	12.75	4 Q	12.75	3rd place, bronze medalist(s)
Gudrun Abt	400 metres hurdles	55.72	8 Q	—N/a		54.52	7 Q	54.04	6
Sabine Richter; Ulrike Sarvari; Andrea Thomas; Ute Thimm	4 × 100 metres relay	42.99	4 Q	—N/a		42.69	4 Q	42.76	4
Ute Thimm; Helga Arendt; Andrea Thomas; Gudrun Abt; Gisela Kinzel (*); Michaela Schabinger (*)	4 × 400 metres relay	3:27.75	6 Q	—N/a				3:22.49	4

Field events

Athlete	Event	Qualification		Final	
Athlete	Event	Distance	Position	Distance	Position
Heike Redetzky	High jump	1.90	13	Did not advance#	
Claudia Losch	Shot put	20.39	1 Q	20.27	5
Iris Plotzitzka	Shot put	19.06	14	Did not advance	
Beate Peters	Javelin throw	60.20	14	Did not advance	
Ingrid Thyssen	Javelin throw	63.32	8 Q	60.76	8

Combined event – Heptathlon

Athlete	Event	100H	HJ	SP	200 m	LJ	JT	800 m	Total	Rank
Sabine Braun	Result	13.71	1.83	13.16	24.78	6.12	44.58	2:22.82	6109	14
Sabine Braun	Points	1020	1016	738	907	887	755	786	6109	14
Sabine Everts	Result	13.74	1.71	11.54	DNF					
Sabine Everts	Points	1015	867	631	DNF					

== Boxing ==
Athlete	Event	Round of 64	Round of 32	Round of 16	Quarterfinals	Semifinals	Final	
Athlete	Event	Opposition Result	Opposition Result	Opposition Result	Opposition Result	Opposition Result	Opposition Result	Rank
Reiner Gies	Light welterweight	Maelagi (SOL); W w/o	Szabó (HUN); W 5–0	Carew (GUY); W 3–2	Altansükh (MGL); W 4–1	Yanovsky (URS); L KO	Did not advance	3rd place, bronze medalist(s)
Alexander Künzler	Welterweight	Omona (UGA); W 5–0	Song G-s (KOR); L 0–5	Did not advance				
Norbert Nieroba	Light middleweight	Felix (GRN); W KO	Downey (CAN); L 2–3	Did not advance				
Sven Ottke	Middleweight	Jacobashvili (ISR); W 5–0	Ha J-h (KOR); W 4–1	Taramov (URS); W 5–0	Marcus (CAN); L 0–5	Did not advance		
Markus Bott	Light heavyweight	—N/a	Suetovius (GDR); W RSC R3	Shanavazov (URS); L 0–5	Did not advance			
Andreas Schnieders	Super heavyweight	—N/a	Kadima (ZAI); W RSC R2	Uba (NGR); W 5–0	Zarenkiewicz (POL); L 2–3	Did not advance		

== Canoeing ==
Men

Athlete	Event	Heats		Repechage		Semifinals		Final	
Athlete	Event	Time	Rank	Time	Rank	Time	Rank	Time	Rank
Hartmut Faust; Wolfram Faust	C-2 500 metres	1:46.52	2 SF	Bye		1:47.70	5	Did not advance	
Hartmut Faust; Wolfram Faust	C-2 1000 metres	3:52.43	4 SF	Bye		3:52.03	3 F	3:55.62	5
Dirk Joestel	K-1 500 metres	1:45.64	1 SF	Bye		1:43.97	3 F	1:47.91	8
Dirk Ulaszewski	K-1 1000 metres	3:45.10	5 R	3:46.46	2 SF	3:44.17	4	Did not advance	
Reiner Scholl; Thomas Pfrang	K-2 500 metres	1:33.29	2 SF	Bye		1:32.73	1 F	1:34.40	4
Niels Ellwanger; Carsten Lömker	K-2 1000 metres	3:37.82	6 R	3:31.95	3 SF	3:28.91	3 F	3:34.63	4
Gilbert Schneider; Reiner Scholl; Dirk Joestel; Thomas Reineck	K-4 1000 metres	3:01.07	2 SF	Bye		3:09.67	3 F	3:05.43	6

Women

Athlete	Event	Heats		Repechage		Semifinals		Final	
Athlete	Event	Time	Rank	Time	Rank	Time	Rank	Time	Rank
Josefa Idem	K-1 500 metres	2:00.42	3 SF	—N/a		1:59.04	3 SF	2:01.80	9
Claudia Österheld; Andrea Martin	K-2 500 metres	1:55.25	6 R	1:56.02	3 SF	1:55.37	4	Did not advance	
Andrea Martin; Claudia Österheld; Josefa Idem; Ruth Domgörgen	K-4 500 metres	1:43.43	5 R	1:42.09	1 F	—N/a		1:45.62	5

== Cycling ==
Fifteen cyclists, twelve men and three women, represented West Germany in 1988.

=== Road ===
Men

Athlete	Event	Time	Rank
Bernd Gröne	Road race	4:32:25	2nd place, silver medalist(s)
Christian Henn	Road race	4:32:46	3rd place, bronze medalist(s)
Remig Stumpf	Road race	4:32:56	14
Ernst Christl; Bernd Gröne; Rajmund Lehnert; Remig Stumpf	Team time trial	2:00:06.3	6

Women

Athlete	Event	Time	Rank
Jutta Niehaus	Road race	2:00:52	2nd place, silver medalist(s)
Viola Paulitz	Road race	2:00:52	13
Ines Varenkamp	Road race	2:00:52	12

=== Track ===
Sprint

Athlete	Event	Qualification		Round 1	Repechage 1	Round 2	Repechage 2	Quarterfinals	Semifinals	Final	
Athlete	Event	Time Speed (km/h)	Rank	Opposition Time Speed (km/h)	Opposition Time Speed (km/h)	Opposition Time Speed (km/h)	Opposition Time Speed (km/h)	Opposition Time Speed (km/h)	Opposition Time Speed (km/h)	Opposition Time Speed (km/h)	Rank
Frank Weber	Men's sprint	10.919	7 Q	Schoefs (BEL); Smith (CAY); L	Pons (ECU); Becerra (BOL); Abrams (GUY); W 11.55	Kovsh (URS); Colas (FRA); L	Harnett (CAN); W 11.39	Heßlich (GDR); L, L	Did not advance	Šustr (TCH); Schoefs (BEL); Cheeseman (TRI); L	7

Time trial

Athlete	Event	Time	Rank
Robert Lechner	Time trial	1:05.114	3rd place, bronze medalist(s)

Pursuit

Athlete	Event	Qualification		Round 1	Quarterfinals	Semifinals	Final	
Athlete	Event	Time	Rank	Opposition Time	Opposition Time	Opposition Time	Opposition Time	Rank
Thomas Dürst	Individual pursuit	4:45.59	10 Q	Beltrami (ITA); L 4:45.20	Did not advance			
Thomas Dürst; Matthias Lange; Uwe Nepp; Michael Rich	Team pursuit	4:23.10	10	—N/a	Did not advance			

Points race

Athlete	Event	Qualification			Final		
Athlete	Event	Laps	Points	Rank	Laps	Points	Rank
Uwe Messerschmidt	Points race	–1	22	7 Q	–2	28	6

== Diving ==
Men

Athlete	Event	Qualification		Final	
Athlete	Event	Points	Rank	Points	Rank
Albin Killat	3 metre springboard	642.60	2 Q	661.47	4
Willi Meyer	3 metre springboard	511.98	21	Did not advance	
Albin Killat	10 metre platform	517.23	13	Did not advance	
Willi Meyer	10 metre platform	449.07	22	Did not advance	

Women

Athlete	Event	Qualification		Final	
Athlete	Event	Points	Rank	Points	Rank
Elke Heinrichs	3 metre springboard	374.46	23	Did not advance	
Anke Mühlbauer	3 metre springboard	400.26	17	Did not advance	
Monika Kühn	10 metre platform	335.88	15	Did not advance	
Doris Pecher	10 metre platform	310.53	19	Did not advance	

== Equestrian ==
=== Dressage ===
Athlete	Horse	Event	Qualification		Final	
Athlete	Horse	Event	Score	Rank	Score	Rank
Reiner Klimke	Ahlerich	Individual	1402	7	Did not advance	
Ann-Kathrin Linsenhoff	Courage	Individual	1411	6 Q	1374	8
Monica Theodorescu	Ganimedes	Individual	1433	3 Q	1385	6
Nicole Uphoff	Rembrandt	Individual	1458	1 Q	1521	1st place, gold medalist(s)
Reiner Klimke; Ann-Kathrin Linsenhoff; Monica Theodorescu; Nicole Uphoff	See above	Team	—N/a		4302	1st place, gold medalist(s)

=== Eventing ===
Athlete	Horse	Event	Dressage		Cross-country			Jumping			Total	
Athlete	Horse	Event	Penalties	Rank	Penalties	Total	Rank	Penalties	Total	Rank	Penalties	Rank
Matthias Baumann	Shamrock II	Individual	50.60	7	13.20	63.80	5	5.00	68.80	6	68.80	6
Ralf Ehrenbrink	Uncle Todd	Individual	66.20	24	39.60	105.80	12	EL			DNF	
Claus Erhorn	Justyn Thyme	Individual	39.60	2	16.00	55.60	4	6.75	62.35	4	62.35	4
Thies Kaspareit	Sherry 42	Individual	46.80	4	38.00	84.80	8	10.00	94.80	9	94.80	9
Matthias Baumann; Ralf Ehrenbrink; Claus Erhorn; Thies Kaspareit	See above	Team	137.00	1	67.20	204.20	1	21.75	225.95	1	225.95	1st place, gold medalist(s)

=== Jumping ===
Athlete	Horse	Event	Qualification						Final	
Athlete	Horse	Event	Round 1		Round 2		Total		Final	
Athlete	Horse	Event	Score	Rank	Score	Rank	Score	Rank	Penalties	Rank
Wolfgang Brinkmann	Pedro	Individual	39.00	36	67.50	7	106.50	19	Did not advance	
Dirk Hafemeister	Orchidee	Individual	69.50	1	70.00	4	139.50	2 Q	18.00	19
Karsten Huck	Nepomuk	Individual	48.00	26	70.00	4	118.00	12 Q	4.00	3rd place, bronze medalist(s)
Franke Sloothaak	Walzerkönig	Individual	48.00	26	56.00	16	104.00	20 q	12.00	7
Ludger Beerbaum; Wolfgang Brinkmann; Dirk Hafemeister; Franke Sloothaak	The Freak; Pedro; Orchidee; Walzerkönig	Team	4.25	1 Q	13.00	4	—N/a		17.25	1st place, gold medalist(s)

== Fencing ==
Individual
Pool stages

Athlete	Event	Group Stage 1							Group Stage 2						Group Stage 3					
Athlete	Event	Opposition Result	Opposition Result	Opposition Result	Opposition Result	Opposition Result	Opposition Result	Rank	Opposition Result	Opposition Result	Opposition Result	Opposition Result	Opposition Result	Rank	Opposition Result	Opposition Result	Opposition Result	Opposition Result	Opposition Result	Rank
Matthias Behr	Men's foil	Mamedov (URS); W 5–0	Enkelmann (GDR); W 5–1	Al-Awadhi (KUW); W 5–3	Kajbjer (SWE); L 4–5	—N/a		1 Q	Zhang (CHN); L 4–5	Marx (USA); L 3–5	Turiace (ARG); L 1–5	García (ESP); W 5–3	Borella (ITA); W 5–3	5 Q	Gátai (HUN); L 3–5	Emura (JPN); L 4–5	Howe (GDR); W 5–1	Groc (FRA); W 5–1	—N/a	3 Q
Mathias Gey	Men's foil	El-Husseini (EGY); W 5–3	Turiace (ARG); W 5–1	Fonseca (BRA); W 5–1	Strand (SWE); L 4–5	—N/a		1 Q	Cerioni (ITA); L 2–5	Groc (FRA); W 5–3	Soumagne (BEL); W 5–4	Davidson (AUS); W 5–2	Enkelmann (GDR); L 4–5	2 Q	Cerioni (ITA); L 3–5	Szekeres (HUN); L 1–5	Wagner (GDR); W 5–3	El-Husseini (EGY); W 5–3	—N/a	4 Q
Ulrich Schreck	Men's foil	Érsek (HUN); W 5–3	Lewison (USA); W 5–1	Umezawa (JPN); W 5–4	Åkerberg (SWE); W 5–2	—N/a		1 Q	Érsek (HUN); W 5–3	Liu (CHN); W 5–1	Umezawa (JPN); W 5–1	Numa (ITA); L 3–5	Wendt (AUT); L 3–5	2 Q	Mamedov (URS); L 2–5	Wendt (AUT); W 5–4	Glasson (CAN); W 5–2	Kajbjer (SWE); W 5–2	—N/a	2 Q
Thomas Gerull	Men's épée	Bergström (SWE); W 5–3	Pinto (COL); W 5–4	Pereira (ESP); W 5–2	Kolczonay (HUN); L 4–5	—N/a		1 Q	Mazzoni (ITA); L 2–5	Ganeff (NED); L 1–5	Yun (KOR); W 5–2	Soumagne (BEL); W 5–2	—N/a	5 Q	Henry (FRA); L 2–5	Yun (KOR); L 4–5	Du (CHN); W 5–3	Chronowski (POL); W 5–3	Stull (USA); W 5–4	3 Q
Alexander Pusch	Men's épée	Yun (KOR); W 5–3	Chronowski (POL); W 5–1	Stull (USA); W 5–1	Youssef (LIB); W 5–1	—N/a		1 Q	Brill (NZL); W 5–2	Strohmeyer (AUT); W 5–1	Turiace (ARG); W 5–2	Ma (CHN); L 1–5	—N/a	1 Q	Shuvalov (URS); L 2–5	Pantano (ITA); L 4–5	Nagele (AUT); W 5–0	Pásztor (HUN); W 5–4	Kuhn (SUI); W 5–4	3 Q
Arnd Schmitt	Men's épée	Kardolus (NED); L 5–5	Siess (POL); W 5–1	Bandeira (POR); W 5–1	Bogarín (PAR); W 5–0	di Tella (ARG); L 3–5	—N/a	1 Q	Henry (FRA); W 5–4	Kuhn (SUI); W 5–2	Siess (POL); W 5–4	Al-Mashmoum (KUW); W 5–4	—N/a	1 Q	Székely (HUN); W 5–2	Poffet (SUI); W 5–2	di Tella (ARG); W 5–1	Birnbaum (AUT); W 5–0	Lee (KOR); L 2–5	1 Q
Felix Becker	Men's sabre	Dalla Barba (ITA); L 4–5	Mindirgasov (URS); W 5–4	Balk (CAN); W 5–0	Lee (KOR); W 5–1	Kościelniakowski (POL); L 1–5	—N/a	3 Q	Alshan (URS); L 4–5	Guichot (FRA); W 5–4	Zheng (CHN); W 5–0	Lee (KOR); W 5–3	—N/a	5 Q	Alshan (URS); L 4–5	Guichot (FRA); W 5–3	Bujdosó (HUN); W 5–3	Banos (CAN); W 5–4	Scalzo (ITA); L 3–5	3 Q
Jürgen Nolte	Men's sabre	Lamour (FRA); L 1–5	Scalzo (ITA); W 5–3	Piguła (POL); W 5–3	Lee (KOR); W 5–2	Martini (MON); W 5–1	—N/a	2 Q	Etropolski (BUL); L 1–5	Delrieu (FRA); L 1–5	Piguła (POL); W 5–3	Banos (CAN); W 5–1	—N/a	3 Q	Delrieu (FRA); L 3–5	Olech (POL); W 5–4	Nébald (HUN); W 5–3	Zheng (CHN); W 5–1	Mindirgasov (URS); L 1–5	4 Q
Stephan Thönnessen	Men's sabre	Bujdosó (HUN); L 2–5	Marin (ITA); L 2–5	Mormando (USA); W 5–3	Wang (CHN); W 5–1	Yan (TPE); W 5–3	Marincheshki (BUL); L 2–5	5 Q	Olech (POL); L 1–5	Dalla Barba (ITA); L 2–5	Bujdosó (HUN); L 2–5	Wang (CHN); W 5–0	—N/a	1 Q	Dalla Barba (ITA); L 4–5	Etropolski (BUL); L 2–5	Mormando (USA); L 2–5	Lamour (FRA); L 4–5	Kościelniakowski (POL); L 2–5	6
Sabine Bau	Women's foil	Glikina (URS); W 5–2	Palm (SWE); W 5–4	Lazăr (ROM); W 5–4	López (MEX); W 5–4	—N/a		1 Q	Zalaffi (ITA); W 5–2	Kovács (HUN); W 5–1	Gaudin (FRA); W 5–3	Dubrawska (POL); W 5–4	Lazăr (ROM); L 0–5	2 Q	Sin (KOR); L 2–5	Vaccaroni (ITA); L 4–5	Glikina (URS); W 5–2	McIntosh (GBR); W 5–3	Philion (CAN); L 2–5	4 Q
Anja Fichtel	Women's foil	Sun (CHN); W 5–0	Dubrawska (POL); W 5–4	McIntosh (GBR); W 5–1	Park (KOR); W 5–1	—N/a		1 Q	Tak (KOR); L 4–5	Sobczak (POL); W 5–3	Gandolfi (ITA); W 5–1	Tremblay (CAN); W 5–0	Spennato (FRA); L 3–5	2 Q	Zalaffi (ITA); L 1–5	Sadovskaya (URS); L 3–5	Jánosi (HUN); W 5–1	Lazăr (ROM); W 5–3	Sobczak (POL); W 5–3	3 Q
Zita Funkenhauser	Women's foil	Gaudin (FRA); W 5–1	Oka (JPN); W 5–1	Kovács (HUN); W 5–0	Koeswandi (INA); W 5–4	—N/a		1 Q	Glikina (URS); L 2–5	Sun (CHN); W 5–0	Palm (SWE); W 5–3	O'Neill (USA); W 5–0	Oka (JPN); L 2–5	3 Q	Stefanek (HUN); L 3–5	Bilodeaux (USA); L 1–5	Królikowska (POL); W 5–4	Thurley (GBR); W 5–3	Spennato (FRA); W 5–1	3 Q

Elimination phase

Athlete	Event	Round 1	Round 2	Round 3	Repechage				Quarterfinals	Semifinals	Final	
Athlete	Event	Round 1	Round 2	Round 3	Round 1	Round 2	Round 3	Round 4	Quarterfinals	Semifinals	Final	
Athlete	Event	Opposition Result	Opposition Result	Opposition Result	Opposition Result	Opposition Result	Opposition Result	Opposition Result	Opposition Result	Opposition Result	Opposition Result	Rank
Matthias Behr	Men's foil	Zhang (CHN); W 10–4	Wagner (GDR); L 8–10	Did not advance	—N/a	Cerioni (ITA); L 8–10	Did not advance					
Mathias Gey	Men's foil	Gosbee (GBR); W 10–7	Zych (POL); W 10–7	Howe (GDR); W 10–6	—N/a				Cerioni (ITA); L 8–10	Did not advance		
Ulrich Schreck	Men's foil	Liu (CHN); W 10–5	Mamedov (URS); W 10–7	Enkelmann (GDR); W 10–9	—N/a				Howe (GDR); W 10–7	Wagner (GDR); L 8–10	Romankov (URS); L 8–10	4
Thomas Gerull	Men's épée	Lee (KOR); L 9–10	Did not advance		Mazzoni (ITA); W 10–6	Brill (NZL); L 7–10	Did not advance					
Alexander Pusch	Men's épée	Vánky (SWE); W 10–5	Poffet (SUI); W 10–7	Shuvalov (URS); L 6–10	—N/a			Cuomo (ITA); L 4–10	Did not advance			
Arnd Schmitt	Men's épée	Machado (BRA); W 10–9	Reznichenko (URS); L 9–10	Did not advance	—N/a	Nagele (AUT); W 10–2	Poffet (SUI); W 10–8	Rivas (COL); W 10–2	Bergström (SWE); W 10–7	Shuvalov (URS); W 10–9	Riboud (FRA); W 10–9	1st place, gold medalist(s)
Felix Becker	Men's sabre	Gedõvári (HUN); W 10–6	Olech (POL); W 10–7	—N/a					Lamour (FRA); L 6–10	Did not advance		
Jürgen Nolte	Men's sabre	Etropolski (BUL); W 10–9	Pogosov (URS); W 10–7	—N/a					Olech (POL); L 7–10	Did not advance		
Stephan Thönnessen	Men's sabre	Did not advance										
Sabine Bau	Women's foil	Stefanek (HUN); L 7–8	Did not advance	—N/a	Voshchakina (URS); W 8–2	Zalaffi (ITA); W 8–7	—N/a		Stefanek (HUN); W 8–6	Funkenhauser (FRG); W 8–3	Fichtel (FRG); L 5–8	2nd place, silver medalist(s)
Anja Fichtel	Women's foil	Bilodeaux (USA); W 8–1	Sadovskaya (URS); W 8–4	—N/a					Sun (CHN); W 8–4	Jánosi (HUN); W 8–5	Bau (FRG); W 8–5	1st place, gold medalist(s)
Zita Funkenhauser	Women's foil	Vaccaroni (ITA); W 8–7	Jánosi (HUN); W 8–4	—N/a					Sadovskaya (URS); W 8–5	Bau (FRG); L 3–8	Jánosi (HUN); W 8–7	3rd place, bronze medalist(s)

Team

Athlete	Event	Group Stage				Round of 16	Quarterfinals	Semifinals	Final	
Athlete	Event	Opposition Result	Opposition Result	Opposition Result	Rank	Opposition Result	Opposition Result	Opposition Result	Opposition Result	Rank
Matthias Behr; Thomas Endres; Mathias Gey; Ulrich Schreck; Thorsten Weidner	Men's foil	France; L 8–8	Sweden; W 9–0	United States; W 9–4	2 Q	—N/a	Italy; W 9–6	East Germany; W 9–4	Soviet Union; L 5–9	2nd place, silver medalist(s)
Elmar Borrmann; Volker Fischer; Thomas Gerull; Alexander Pusch; Arnd Schmitt	Men's épée	United States; W 9–2	Brazil; W 9–3	—N/a	1 Q	Bye	South Korea; W 8–6	Italy; W 8–7	France; L 3–8	2nd place, silver medalist(s)
Felix Becker; Jörg Kempenich; Jürgen Nolte; Dieter Schneider; Stephan Thönnessen	Men's sabre	Italy; L 5–9	United States; W 9–3	South Korea; W 9–1	2 q	—N/a	France; L 5–9	—N/a	Poland; L 4–9	6
Sabine Bau; Anja Fichtel; Zita Funkenhauser; Annette Klug; Christiane Weber	Women's foil	United States; W 9–1	Great Britain; W 9–3	—N/a	1 Q	—N/a	France; W 9–4	Soviet Union; W 9–3	Italy; W 9–4	1st place, gold medalist(s)

== Football ==
Summary

Key:

- a.e.t. – After extra time.
- P – Match decided by penalty shoot-out.

Team	Event	Group stage				Quarter-finals	Semi-finals	Final / BM	
Team	Event	Opposition Score	Opposition Score	Opposition Score	Rank	Opposition Score	Opposition Score	Opposition Score	Rank
West Germany men's	Men's tournament	China; W 3–0	Tunisia; W 4–1	Sweden; L 1–2	2 Q	Zambia; W 4–0	Brazil; L 2–3^{P} 1–1 (a.e.t.)	Italy; W 3–0	3rd place, bronze medalist(s)

Team roster

No.	Pos.	Player	DoB	Age	Caps	Club	Tournament games	Tournament goals	Minutes played	Sub off	Sub on	Cards yellow/red
1	GK	Oliver Reck	27 February 1965	23	0	(West Germany) SV Werder Bremen	0	0	0	0	0	0
2	DF	Michael Schulz	3 September 1961	27	0	(West Germany) 1. FC Kaiserslautern	6	0	570	0	0	(yellow card) 1
3	DF	Armin Görtz	30 August 1959	29	2	(West Germany) 1. FC Köln	5	0	445	2	0	0
4	DF	Wolfgang Funkel	10 August 1958	30	2	(West Germany) Bayer Uerdingen	5	1	480	0	0	0
5	DF	Thomas Hörster	27 November 1956	31	4	(West Germany) Bayer 04 Leverkusen	6	0	570	0	0	(yellow card) 2
6	MF	Olaf Janßen	8 October 1966	21	0	(West Germany) 1. FC Köln	2	0	27	0	2	0
7	MF	Rudi Bommer	19 August 1957	31	6	(West Germany) Viktoria Aschaffenburg	1	0	5	0	1	0
8	MF	Holger Fach	6 September 1962	26	1	(West Germany) Bayer 04 Leverkusen	5	2	474	1	0	0
9	FW	Jürgen Klinsmann	30 July 1964	24	9	(West Germany) VfB Stuttgart	6	4	570	0	0	0
10	MF	Wolfram Wuttke	17 November 1961	27	4	(West Germany) 1. FC Kaiserslautern	6	2	491	4	0	(yellow card) 1
11	FW	Frank Mill	23 July 1958	30	13	(West Germany) Borussia Dortmund	5	3	421	2	0	(yellow card) 3
12	GK	Uwe Kamps	12 June 1964	24	0	(West Germany) Borussia Mönchengladbach	6	0	570	0	0	0
13	DF	Roland Grahammer	3 November 1963	24	0	(West Germany) Bayern München	6	1	570	0	0	0
14	MF	Thomas Häßler	30 May 1966	22	1	(West Germany) 1. FC Köln	6	0	557	1	0	0
15	MF	Christian Schreier	4 February 1959	29	1	(West Germany) Bayer 04 Leverkusen	4	1	72	0	4	0
16	FW	Fritz Walter	21 July 1960	28	0	(West Germany) VfB Stuttgart	1	1	45	0	1	0
17	MF	Ralf Sievers	30 October 1961	26	?	(West Germany) Eintracht Frankfurt	1	0	85	1	0	0
18	DF	Gerhard Kleppinger	1 March 1958	30	0	(West Germany) Bayer Uerdingen	6	1	289	0	4	0
19	FW	Karl-Heinz Riedle	9 September 1965	23	1	(West Germany) SV Werder Bremen	1	0	29	1	0	0
20	DF	Gunnar Sauer	11 June 1964	24	0	(West Germany) SV Werder Bremen	0	0	0	0	0	0

Group play

Pos	Team	Pld	W	D	L	GF	GA	GD	Pts
1	Sweden	3	2	1	0	6	3	+3	5
2	West Germany	3	2	0	1	8	3	+5	4
3	Tunisia	3	0	2	1	3	6	−3	2
4	China	3	0	1	2	0	5	−5	1

Source: FIFA
17 September 1988
17:00

China	0–3	West Germany
	[Report]	Wuttke 31'; Mill 60', 89'

Busan Gudeok Stadium, Busan
Attendance: 24,000
Referee: Juan Daniel Cardellino (URU)

19 September 1988
17:00

Tunisia	1–4	West Germany
Maaloul 26' (pen.)	[Report]	Grahammer 4'; Fach 50'; Mill 55'; Wuttke 75' (pen.)

Busan Gudeok Stadium, Busan
Attendance: 14,000
Referee: Keith Hackett (ENG)

21 September 1988
19:00

Sweden	2–1	West Germany
Engqvist 64'; Lönn 85'	[Report]	Walter 60'

Daegu Civic Stadium, Daegu
Attendance: 17,000
Referee: Kurt Röthlisberger (SUI)

Quarterfinal

25 September 1988

West Germany	4–0	Zambia
Funkel 18'; Klinsmann 34', 42', 89'	Report

Gwangju Mudeung Stadium, Gwangju
Attendance: 8,000
Referee: Jesús Díaz (COL)

Semifinal

27 September 1988

Brazil	1–1 (a.e.t.)	West Germany
Romário 79'	Report	Fach 50'
Penalties
	3–2

Olympic Stadium, Seoul
Attendance: 65,000
Referee: Keith Hackett (GBR)

Bronze medal match

30 September 1988

Italy	0–3	West Germany
	Report	Klinsmann 5'; Kleppinger 18'; Schreier 68'

Olympic Stadium, Seoul
Attendance: 61,000
Referee: Juan Carlos Loustau (ARG)

== Gymnastics ==
=== Artistic ===
Men
Team

Athlete	Event	Qualification							
Athlete	Event	Apparatus						Total	Rank
Athlete	Event	F	PH	R	V	PB	HB	Total	Rank
Andreas Aguilar	Team	18.050	18.600	19.700	18.550	19.450	19.000	113.350	73
Mike Beckmann	Team	19.250	19.450	18.600	19.250	19.300	18.600	114.450	60
Jürgen Brümmer	Team	19.350	18.950	19.400	19.550	19.050	17.850	114.150	64
Ralph Kern	Team	19.150	19.000	18.400	19.300	19.300	18.750	113.900	67
Bernhard Simmelbauer	Team	18.800	18.800	18.950	19.150	19.250	18.650	113.600	71
Daniel Winkler	Team	19.050	18.900	18.900	19.100	19.300	19.250	114.500	59
Total	Team	95.600	95.400	95.750	96.350	96.600	94.400	574.100	12

Women

Athlete	Event	Qualification					
Athlete	Event	Apparatus				Total	Rank
Athlete	Event	V	UB	BB	F	Total	Rank
Michaela Ustorf	Individual	18.650	18.250	19.025	18.950	74.875	78
Isabella von Lospichl	Individual	18.225	18.000	9.375	9.450	55.050	85

=== Rhythmic ===
Athlete	Event	Qualification						Final						
Athlete	Event	Hoop	Rope	Clubs	Ribbon	Total	Rank	Qualification	Hoop	Rope	Clubs	Ribbon	Total	Rank
Marion Rothhaar	Individual	9.600	9.600	9.700	9.600	38.500	17 Q	19.250	9.600	9.700	9.700	9.600	57.850	19
Diana Schmiemann	Individual	9.600	9.700	9.800	9.700	38.800	10 Q	19.400	9.800	9.800	9.800	9.800	58.600	8

== Hockey ==
Summary

Key:

- FT – After full time.
- P – Match decided by penalty-shootout.

Team	Event	Group stage						Semifinal	Final / BM	
Team	Event	Opposition Score	Opposition Score	Opposition Score	Opposition Score	Opposition Score	Rank	Opposition Score	Opposition Score	Rank
West Germany men's	Men's tournament	Canada; W 3–1	India; D 1–1	Great Britain; W 2–1	South Korea; W 1–0	Soviet Union; W 6–0	1 Q	Netherlands; W 2–1	Great Britain; L 1–3	2nd place, silver medalist(s)
West Germany women's	Women's tournament	South Korea; L 1–3	Australia; L 0–1	Canada; W 2–1	—N/a		3	United States; W 2–1	Canada; W 4–2	5

=== Men's tournament ===
Team roster

- Christian Schliemann
- Tobias Frank
- Horst-Ulrich Hänel
- Carsten Fischer
- Andreas Mollandin
- Ekkhard Schmidt-Opper
- Dirk Brinkmann
- Heiner Dopp
- Stefan Blöcher
- Andreas Keller
- Thomas Reck
- Thomas Brinkmann
- Hanns-Henning Fastrich
- Michael Hilgers
- Volker Fried
- Michael Metz

Group play

Pos	Team	Pld	W	D	L	GF	GA	GD	Pts	Qualification
1	West Germany	5	4	1	0	13	3	+10	9	Semi-finals
2	Great Britain	5	3	1	1	12	5	+7	7	Semi-finals
3	India	5	2	1	2	9	7	+2	5	5–8th place semi-finals
4	Soviet Union	5	2	1	2	5	10	−5	5	5–8th place semi-finals
5	South Korea (H)	5	0	2	3	5	10	−5	2	9–12th place semi-finals
6	Canada	5	0	2	3	3	12	−9	2	9–12th place semi-finals

Source: FIH
(H) Hosts

18 September 1988
13:30

West Germany	3–1	Canada
Fisher 23'; Blöcher 29'; Reck 50'	Report	Gifford 8'

Umpires:
K Bajwa (PAK)
Ron Lathouwers (NED)

20 September 1988
13:30

West Germany	1–1	India
Hilgers 39'	Report	Sebastian 31'

Umpires:
Santiago Deo (ESP)
Alain Renaud (FRA)

22 September 1988
15:15

Great Britain	1–2	West Germany
Barber 2'	Report	Fischer 59'; Blöcher 69'

Umpires:
Don Prior (AUS)
Eduardo Ruiz (ARG)

24 September 1988
09:00

West Germany	1–0	South Korea
Fischer 62'	Report

Umpires:
Louismichel Gillet (FRA)
K Bajwa (PAK)

26 September 1988
10:45

West Germany	6–0	Soviet Union
Mollandin 5'; Blöcher 19'; Dopp 41'; Fischer 45'; Keller 53'; Hilgers 59'	Report

Umpires:
Don Prior (AUS)
Amjarit Dhak (KEN)

Semifinal

28 September 1988
13:00

West Germany	2–1	Netherlands
Dopp 40'; Reck 47'	Report	Cruico 10'

Umpires:
Eduardo Ruiz (ARG)
Alain Renaud (FRA)

Gold medal match

1 October 1988
15:15

West Germany	1–3	Great Britain
Dopp 59'	Report	Sherwani 20', 53'; Kerly 47'

Umpires:
Don Prior (AUS)
Santiago Deo (ESP)

=== Women's tournament ===
Team roster

- Susi Schmid
- Carola Hoffmann
- Heike Gehrmann
- Dagmar Breiken-Bremer
- Gaby Uhlenbruck
- Viola Grahl
- Bettina Blumenberg
- Gaby Appel
- Martina Koch-Hallmen
- Christine Ferneck
- Silke Wehrmeister
- Caren Jungjohann
- Eva Hegener
- Susie Wollschläger
- Gabriela Schöwe

Group play

Pos	Team	Pld	W	D	L	GF	GA	GD	Pts	Qualification
1	South Korea	3	2	1	0	12	7	+5	5	Semi-finals
2	Australia	3	1	2	0	7	6	+1	4	Semi-finals
3	West Germany	3	1	0	2	3	6	−3	2	5th–8th place classification
4	Canada	3	0	1	2	3	6	−3	1	5th–8th place classification

Source: FIH

21 September 1988
10:45

South Korea	4–1	West Germany
Lim 3', 35+'; Chung S. 61'; Seo K. 70+'	Report	Gehrmann 13'

Umpires:
Salobrar Hernandez (ESP)
Pauline Bullock (GBR)

23 September 1988
09:00

Australia	1–0	West Germany
Bowman 68'	Report

Umpires:
Pauline Bullock (GBR)
Jean Robertson (GBR)

25 September 1988
10:45

Canada	1–2	West Germany
Lyn 49'	Report	Blumenberg 26'; Jungjohann 51'

Umpires:
Laura Crespo (ARG)
A Poelmans (NED)

Classification 5th-8th place

27 September 1988
09:00

United States	1–2	West Germany
Donnelly 19'	Report	Wollschläger 41'; Blumenberg 49'

Umpires:
Jolanda Mohlmann (NED)
Naomi Kato (JPN)

5th place match

29 September 1988
09:00

West Germany	4–2	Canada
Blumenberg 14', 59', 64'; Schmid 57'	Report	Forshaw 18', 52'

Umpires:
Dominique Ache (BEL)
Jean Robertson (GBR)

== Judo ==
Athlete	Event	Round of 64	Round of 32	Round of 16	Quarterfinals	Semifinals	Repechage			Final	
Athlete	Event	Round of 64	Round of 32	Round of 16	Quarterfinals	Semifinals	Round 1	Round 2	Round 3	Final	
Athlete	Event	Opposition Result	Opposition Result	Opposition Result	Opposition Result	Opposition Result	Opposition Result	Opposition Result	Opposition Result	Opposition Result	Rank
Helmut Dietz	60 kg	Bye	Kiejda (POL); W Keikoku	Berenstein (NED); W Keikoku	Kim (KOR); L Ippon	Did not advance	—N/a		Totikashvili (URS); L Yuko	Did not advance	
Guido Schumacher	65 kg	Bye	Kostadinov (BUL); L Ippon	Did not advance							
Steffen Stranz	71 kg	Bye	Dossou (BEN); W Ippon	Loll (GDR); L Koka	Did not advance		—N/a	Wohlwend (LIE); W Ippon	Swain (USA); L Yusei-gachi	Did not advance	
Frank Wieneke	78 kg	Reiter (AUT); W Ippon	Adolfsson (SWE); W Yuko	González (ESP); W Ippon	Tayot (FRA); W Koka	Bréchôt (GDR); W Koka	—N/a			Legień (POL); L Ippon	2nd place, silver medalist(s)
Michael Bazynski	86 kg	Spijkers (NED); L Yuko	Did not advance								
Marc Meiling	95 kg	—N/a	Bye	Berland (USA); W Chui	Van de Walle (BEL); W Ippon	Beutler (POL); W Chui	—N/a			Miguel (BRA); L Chui	2nd place, silver medalist(s)
Alexander von der Groeben	+95 kg	—N/a	Cho (KOR); L Ippon	Did not advance							

== Modern pentathlon ==
Three male pentathletes represented West Germany in 1988.

Athlete	Event	Riding (show jumping)			Fencing (épée one touch)			Swimming (300 m freestyle)			Shooting (Rapid fire pistol)			Running (4000 m)			Total points	Final rank
Athlete	Event	Penalties	Rank	MP points	Results	Rank	MP points	Time	Rank	MP points	Points	Rank	MP Points	Time	Rank	MP Points	Total points	Final rank
Dirk Knappheide	Individual	66	12	1034	26–39	51	677	3:20.34	12	1272	191	22	934	DNF		0	3917	60
Marcus Marsollek	Individual	242	46	858	36–29	17	847	3:36.88	46	1140	196	4	1044	13:50.91	30	1075	4964	24
Michael Zimmermann	Individual	150	32	950	34–31	27	813	3:24.23	26	1240	186	52	824	14:30.23	49	955	4782	41
Dirk Knappheide; Marcus Marsollek; Michael Zimmermann	Team	458	7	2842	96–99	12	2337	10:21.45	9	3652	573	7	2802	DNF	18	2030	13663	15

== Rowing ==
Men

Athlete	Event	Heats		Repechage		Semifinals		Final	
Athlete	Event	Time	Rank	Time	Rank	Time	Rank	Time	Rank
Peter-Michael Kolbe	Single sculls	7:12.35	3 R	7:12.27	1 SF	7:01.76	1 FA	6:54.77	2nd place, silver medalist(s)
Christian Händle; Ralf Thienel	Double sculls	6:21.95	2 R	6:37.84	1 SF	6:23.55	2 FA	6:24.97	4
Christoph Galandi; Oliver Grüner; Georg Agrikola; Andreas Reinke	Quadruple sculls	5:52.45	3 SF	—N/a		5:50.96	3 FA	5:59.59	6
Frank Dietrich; Michael Twittmann	Coxless pair	6:45.73	2 R	6:52.03	1 SF	6:54.24	4 FB	7:19.48	7
Norbert Keßlau; Volker Grabow; Jörg Puttlitz; Guido Grabow	Coxless four	6:13.16	3 SF	—N/a		6:04.17	1 FA	6:06.22	3rd place, bronze medalist(s)
Roland Baar; Wolfgang Klapheck; Christoph Korte; Andreas Lütkefels; Martin Ruppel	Coxed four	6:02.98	2 SF	—N/a		6:15.87	4 FB	6:42.65	7
Thomas Möllenkamp; Matthias Mellinghaus; Eckhardt Schultz; Ansgar Wessling; Armin Eichholz; Thomas Domian; Wolfgang Maennig; Bahne Rabe; Manfred Klein	Eight	5:32.36	1 FA	—N/a				5:46.05	1st place, gold medalist(s)

Women

Athlete	Event	Heats		Repechage		Semifinals		Final	
Athlete	Event	Time	Rank	Time	Rank	Time	Rank	Time	Rank
Bettina Kämpf; Cordula Keller	Coxless pair	8:19.76	5 R	8:20.13	4 FB	—N/a		8:22.08	9
Inge Althoff; Meike Holländer; Elke Markwort; Gabriele Mehl; Kerstin Peters; Cerstin Petersmann; Katrin Petersmann; Kerstin Rehders; Anja Schäfer	Eight	6:38.31	3 R	6:12.70	5	—N/a		Did not advance	7

== Sailing ==
Men

Athlete	Event	Race							Net points	Final rank
Athlete	Event	1	2	3	4	5	6	7	Net points	Final rank
Joachim Hunger; Wolfgang Hunger	470	3	10	15	~~19~~	5.7	8	17	58.7	5

Women

Athlete	Event	Race							Net points	Final rank
Athlete	Event	1	2	3	4	5	6	7	Net points	Final rank
Katrin Adlkofer; Susanne Meyer	470	17	18	5.7	5.7	~~28~~	0	10	56.4	5

Open

Athlete	Event	Race							Net points	Final rank
Athlete	Event	1	2	3	4	5	6	7	Net points	Final rank
Dirk Meyer	Division II	16	15	18	13	17	~~32~~	20	99	13
Thomas Schmid	Finn	3	15	19	11.7	11.7	11.7	~~40~~	72.1	6
Alexander Hagen; Fritz Girr	Star	3	11.7	10	8	~~28~~	28	11.7	72.4	10
Hans-Jürgen Pfohe; Roland Gäbler	Tornado	21	14	17	~~30~~	30	30	30	142	19
Jens-Peter Wrede; Matthias Adamczewski; Stefan Knabe	Soling	18	~~24~~	16	20	15	13	20	102	15
Albert Batzill; Peter Lang	Flying Dutchman	19	3	10	14	20	13	~~29~~	79	8

== Shooting ==
Men

Athlete	Event	Qualification		Final	
Athlete	Event	Points	Rank	Points	Rank
Kurt Hillenbrand	50 m rifle three positions	1155	38	Did not advance	
Kurt Hillenbrand	50 m rifle prone	590	41	Did not advance	
Arndt Kaspar	10 m air pistol	579	12	Did not advance	
Arndt Kaspar	50 m pistol	562	7 Q	651	7
Dirk Köhler	25 m rapid fire pistol	591	8 Q	689	8
Ulrich Lind	50 m rifle three positions	1161	28	Did not advance	
Alfons Messerschmitt	10 m air pistol	577	18	Did not advance	
Alfons Messerschmitt	50 m pistol	554	23	Did not advance	
Johann Riederer	10 m air rifle	592	3 Q	694.0	3rd place, bronze medalist(s)
Bernd Rücker	50 m rifle prone	597	5 Q	700.5	7
Matthias Stich	10 m air rifle	587	17	Did not advance	
Christian Stützinger	50 m running target	586	8	Did not advance	

Women

Athlete	Event	Qualification		Final	
Athlete	Event	Points	Rank	Points	Rank
Lieselotte Breker	10 m air pistol	386	3 Q	476.0	7
Lieselotte Breker	25 m pistol	585	6 Q	685	4
Carmen Giese	10 m air rifle	389	17	Did not advance	
Anetta Kalinowski	25 m pistol	581	12	Did not advance	
Selma Sonnet	50 m rifle three positions	580	11	Did not advance	
Silvia Sperber	10 m air rifle	393	7 Q	497.5	2nd place, silver medalist(s)
Silvia Sperber	50 m rifle three positions	590	1 Q	685.6	1st place, gold medalist(s)
Margit Stein	10 m air pistol	376	19	Did not advance	

Mixed

Athlete	Event	Qualification		Final	
Athlete	Event	Points	Rank	Points	Rank
Michaela Rink	Skeet	140	44	Did not advance	
Herbert Seeberger	Skeet	196	10	Did not advance	
Wolfgang Trautwein	Skeet	141	40	Did not advance	

== Swimming ==
Men

Athlete	Event	Heats		Final A/B	
Athlete	Event	Time	Rank	Time	Rank
Peter Bermel	200 m individual medley	2:04.80	7 FA	2:03.81	5
Peter Bermel	400 m individual medley	4:22.78	7 FA	4:24.02	8
Jens-Peter Berndt	100 m backstroke	57.08	12 FB	Withdrew	
Jens-Peter Berndt	200 m backstroke	2:01.77	6 FA	2:01.84	6
Jens-Peter Berndt	200 m individual medley	2:04.80	10 FB	2:06.76	15
Jens-Peter Berndt	400 m individual medley	4:20.93	6 FA	4:21.71	6
Thomas Fahrner	100 m freestyle	50.78	13 FB	51.12	14
Thomas Fahrner	200 m freestyle	1:49.02	6 FA	1:49.19	8
Michael Groß	200 m freestyle	1:48.55	3 FA	1:48.59	5
Michael Groß	100 m butterfly	53.78	4 FA	53.44	5
Michael Groß	200 m butterfly	1:58.09	1 FA	1:56.94 OR	1st place, gold medalist(s)
Stephan Güsgen	50 m freestyle	23.22	11 FB	23.55	14
Rainer Henkel	400 m freestyle	3:51.50	10 FB	Withdrew	
Rainer Henkel	1500 m freestyle	15:14.64	6 FA	15:18.19	6
Frank Henter	50 m freestyle	22.98	7 FA	23.03	7
Martin Herrmann	100 m butterfly	55.20	17	Did not advance	
Martin Herrmann	200 m butterfly	2:02.61	21	Did not advance	
Frank Hoffmeister	100 m backstroke	56.19	5 FA	56.19	7
Frank Hoffmeister	200 m backstroke	2:03.34	12 FB	2:01.65	9
Alexander Mayer	100 m breaststroke	1:03.54	11 FB	1:03.85	12
Stefan Pfeiffer	400 m freestyle	3:49.52	2 FA	3:49.96	6
Stefan Pfeiffer	1500 m freestyle	15:07.85	3 FA	15:02.69	2nd place, silver medalist(s)
Mark Warnecke	100 m breaststroke	1:03.56	12 FB	1:03.40	11
Mark Warnecke	200 m breaststroke	2:22.55	31	Did not advance	
Hartmut Wedekind	200 m breaststroke	2:22.55	31	Did not advance	
Torsten Wiegel	100 m freestyle	51.02	19	Did not advance	
Michael Groß; Thomas Fahrner; Björn Zikarsky; Peter Sitt; Torsten Wiegel (*)	4 × 100 m freestyle relay	3:23.19	6 FA	3:21.65	6
Erik Hochstein; Thomas Fahrner; Rainer Henkel; Michael Groß; Stefan Pfeiffer (*); Peter Sitt (*)	4 × 200 m freestyle relay	7:19.38	3 FA	7:14.35	3rd place, bronze medalist(s)
Frank Hoffmeister; Alexander Mayer; Michael Groß; Björn Zikarsky; Mark Warnecke (*)	4 × 100 m medley relay	3:44.72	4 FA	3:42.98	4

Women

Athlete	Event	Heats		Final A/B	
Athlete	Event	Time	Rank	Time	Rank
Marion Aizpors	50 m freestyle	26.20	9 FB	26.17	9
Marion Aizpors	100 m backstroke	1:03.27	8 FA	1:04.19	8
Ina Beyermann	100 m butterfly	1:02.85	19	Did not advance	
Ina Beyermann	200 m butterfly	2:13.56	11 FB	2:13.74	10
Britta Dahm	100 m breaststroke	1:12.98	22	Did not advance	
Britta Dahm	200 m breaststroke	2:35.06	17	Did not advance	
Heike Esser	100 m breaststroke	DNS			
Heike Esser	200 m breaststroke	2:41.34	34	Did not advance	
Birgit Lohberg-Schulz	200 m freestyle	2:02.77	16 FB	2:02.32	15
Birgit Lohberg-Schulz	200 m individual medley	2:17.46	9 FB	2:17.85	10
Birgit Lohberg-Schulz	400 m individual medley	4:52.05	13 FB	4:50.54	10
Stephanie Ortwig	200 m freestyle	2:00.66	6 FA	2:00.73	7
Stephanie Ortwig	400 m freestyle	4:12.18	7 FA	4:13.05	7
Stephanie Ortwig	800 m freestyle	8:41.95	14	Did not advance	
Christiane Pielke	50 m freestyle	26.33	12 FB	26.22	10
Christiane Pielke	100 m freestyle	57.47	19	Did not advance	
Gabi Reha	100 m butterfly	1:02.27	15 FB	1:02.63	15
Gabi Reha	200 m butterfly	2:13.09	9 FB	2:14.20	11
Alexandra Russ	400 m freestyle	4:18.67	22	Did not advance	
Alexandra Russ	800 m freestyle	8:49.31	17	Did not advance	
Svenja Schlicht	100 m backstroke	1:03.72	10 FB	1:03.68	10
Svenja Schlicht	200 m backstroke	2:16.81	8 FA	2:15.94	8
Svenja Schlicht	200 m individual medley	2:20.31	18	Did not advance	
Katja Ziliox	100 m freestyle	58.39	31	Did not advance	
Katja Ziliox	200 m backstroke	2:26.25	28	Did not advance	
Stephanie Ortwig; Marion Aizpors; Christiane Pielke; Karin Seick; Katja Ziliox (*)	4 × 100 m freestyle relay	3:48.03	6 FA	3:46.90	7
Svenja Schlicht; Britta Dahm; Gabi Reha; Marion Aizpors	4 × 100 m medley relay	4:13.19	4 FA	4:12.89	7

== Synchronized swimming ==
Three synchronized swimmers represented West Germany in 1988.

Athlete	Event	Figures		Qualification			Final		
Athlete	Event	Points	Rank	Points	Total (Figures + Qualification)	Rank	Points	Total (Figures + Final)	Rank
Doris Eisenhofer	Solo	80.433	36	Did not advance					
Heike Friedrich	Solo	82.000	32	Did not advance					
Gerlind Scheller	Solo	85.583	19 Q	88.600	174.183	8 Q	90.400	175.983	8
Heike Friedrich; Gerlind Scheller	Duet	83.792	9	88.800	172.592	10	Did not advance		

== Table tennis ==
Men

Athlete	Event	Group Stage								Round of 16	Quarterfinal	Semifinal	Final	
Athlete	Event	Opposition Result	Opposition Result	Opposition Result	Opposition Result	Opposition Result	Opposition Result	Opposition Result	Rank	Opposition Result	Opposition Result	Opposition Result	Opposition Result	Rank
Georg Böhm	Singles	Maringgi (INA); W 3–0	Griffiths (NZL); W 3–1	Waldner (SWE); L 0–3	Xu (CHN); L 0–3	Hosnani (MRI); W 3–0	Birocheau (FRA); W 3–0	Chih (TPE); W 3–1	3	Did not advance				
Jörg Roßkopf	Singles	Haberl (AUS); W 3–1	Ghorpade (IND); W 3–0	Grubba (POL); L 0–3	Primorac (YUG); L 1–3	López (VEN); W 3–0	Miyazaki (JPN); W 3–2	Musa (NGR); W 3–2	3	Did not advance				
Georg Böhm; Jürgen Rebel	Doubles	Douglas / Andrew (GBR); L 1–2	Chih / Chih (TPE); L 1–2	Ding / Bär (AUT); L 0–2	Griffiths / Jackson (NZL); W 2–0	Álvarez / Fermín (DOM); W 2–0	Waldner / Appelgren (SWE); L 0–2	Kim / Kim (KOR); L 1–2	5	—N/a	Did not advance			
Jörg Roßkopf; Steffen Fetzner	Doubles	Lo / Vong (HKG); W 2–1	Gambra / Núñez (CHI); W 2–0	An / Yu (KOR); L 1–2	Grubba / Kucharski (POL); L 0–2	Adeyemo / Bankole (NGR); W 2–0	Saito / Watanabe (JPN); W 2–0	Kano / Kawai (BRA); W 2–1	3	—N/a	Did not advance			

Women

Athlete	Event	Group Stage								Round of 16	Quarterfinal	Semifinal	Final	
Athlete	Event	Opposition Result	Opposition Result	Opposition Result	Opposition Result	Opposition Result	Opposition Result	Opposition Result	Rank	Opposition Result	Opposition Result	Opposition Result	Opposition Result	Rank
Olga Nemes	Singles	Díaz (CHI); W 3–0	Hong (KOR); L 1–3	Akanmu (NGR); W 3–0	Kloppenburg (NED); W 3–0	Bátorfi (HUN); W 3–2	—N/a		2 Q	Li (CHN); L 1–3	Did not advance			
Katja Nolten	Singles	Fazlić (YUG); L 2–3	Liyau (PER); W 3–2	Owolabi (NGR); W 3–2	Hyun (KOR); L 0–3	Hoshino (JPN); L 2–3	—N/a		4	Did not advance				
Olga Nemes; Katja Nolten	Doubles	Ishida / Hoshino (JPN); L 1–2	Gee / Bhushan (USA); W 2–1	Leong / Lau (MAS); W 2–0	Chen / Jiao (CHN); L 0–2	Hrachová / Kasalová (TCH); L 0–2	Vriesekoop / Kloppenburg (NED); L 1–2	—N/a	5	—N/a	Did not advance			

== Tennis ==
Men

Athlete	Event	Round of 64	Round of 32	Round of 16	Quarterfinals	Semifinals	Final	
Athlete	Event	Opposition Result	Opposition Result	Opposition Result	Opposition Result	Opposition Result	Opposition Result	Rank
Eric Jelen	Singles	Mečíř (TCH); L (7–5, 1–6, 2–6, 6–7)	Did not advance					
Carl-Uwe Steeb	Singles	Volkov (URS); W (7–5, 6–4, 6–3)	Masur (AUS); W (6–3, 5–7, 6–3, 1–6, 7–5)	Järryd (SWE); W (2–6, 7–5, 6–3, 7–5)	Mayotte (USA); L (6–7, 5–7, 3–6)	Did not advance		
Carl-Uwe Steeb; Eric Jelen	Doubles	—N/a	Edberg / Järryd (SWE); L (4–6, 6–4, 4–6, 2–6)	Did not advance				

Women

Athlete	Event	Round of 64	Round of 32	Round of 16	Quarterfinals	Semifinals	Final	
Athlete	Event	Opposition Result	Opposition Result	Opposition Result	Opposition Result	Opposition Result	Opposition Result	Rank
Steffi Graf	Singles	Bye	Meskhi (URS); W (7–5, 6—1)	Suire (FRA); W (6–3, 6–0)	Savchenko (URS); W (6–2, 4–6, 6–3)	Garrison (USA); W (6–2, 6–0)	Sabatini (ARG); W (6–3, 6–3)	1st place, gold medalist(s)
Sylvia Hanika	Singles	Bye	Muir (ZIM); W (6–1, 6–1)	Sabatini (ARG); L (6–1, 4–6, 2–6)	Did not advance			
Claudia Kohde-Kilsch	Singles	Bye	Reggi (ITA); L (6–4, 6–7, 3–6)	Did not advance				
Steffi Graf; Claudia Kohde-Kilsch	Doubles	—N/a		Bye	Bassett-Seguso / Hetherington (CAN); W (6–3, 3–6, 6–2)	Novotná / Suková (TCH); L (5–7, 3–6)	Did not advance	3rd place, bronze medalist(s)

== Water polo ==
Summary

Key:

- FT – After full time.
- P – Match decided by penalty-shootout.

Team	Event	Group stage						Semifinal	Final / BM	
Team	Event	Opposition Score	Opposition Score	Opposition Score	Opposition Score	Opposition Score	Rank	Opposition Score	Opposition Score	Rank
West Germany men's	Men's tournament	Australia; W 13–11	France; W 10–9	South Korea; W 18–2	Italy; W 10–7	Soviet Union; W 9–8	1 Q	Yugoslavia; L 10–14	Soviet Union; L 13–14	4

Team roster
- Peter Röhle
- Dirk Jacoby
- Frank Otto
- Uwe Sterzik
- Armando Fernández
- Andreas Ehrl
- Ingo Borgmann
- Rainer Osselmann
- Hagen Stamm
- Thomas Huber
- Dirk Theismann
- René Reimann
- Werner Obschernikat
- Head coach: Nicola Firuio

Group play

Team	Pld	W	D	L	GF	GA	GD	Pts
West Germany	5	5	0	0	60	37	+23	10
Soviet Union	5	3	1	1	63	30	+33	7
Italy	5	3	1	1	48	33	+15	7
Australia	5	2	0	3	40	39	+1	4
France	5	1	0	4	43	54	−11	2
South Korea	5	0	0	5	14	75	−61	0

Source: https://www.olympedia.org/results/38727

21 September 1988; 16:30	West Germany	13–11	Australia	Jamsil Indoor Swimming Pool; Referees: Luis Cillero (ESP), Robert Lee (USA)
21 September 1988; 16:30	Score by quarters: 4–4, 2–1, 3–3, 4–3			Jamsil Indoor Swimming Pool; Referees: Luis Cillero (ESP), Robert Lee (USA)
21 September 1988; 16:30	Otto 4	Goals	Wybrow 4	Jamsil Indoor Swimming Pool; Referees: Luis Cillero (ESP), Robert Lee (USA)

22 September 1988; 15:15	West Germany	10–9	France	Jamsil Indoor Swimming Pool; Referees: Antal Vuszek (HUN), Apostolos Tsantas (GRE)
22 September 1988; 15:15	Score by quarters: 2–2, 3–3, 2–1, 3–3			Jamsil Indoor Swimming Pool; Referees: Antal Vuszek (HUN), Apostolos Tsantas (GRE)
22 September 1988; 15:15	five players 2	Goals	Garsau 3	Jamsil Indoor Swimming Pool; Referees: Antal Vuszek (HUN), Apostolos Tsantas (GRE)

23 September 1988; 14:00	West Germany	18–2	South Korea	Jamsil Indoor Swimming Pool; Referees: Robert Lee (USA), He Liangde (CHN)
23 September 1988; 14:00	Score by quarters: 5–0, 3–1, 6–0, 4–1			Jamsil Indoor Swimming Pool; Referees: Robert Lee (USA), He Liangde (CHN)
23 September 1988; 14:00	Stamm 6	Goals	Song, Lee 1	Jamsil Indoor Swimming Pool; Referees: Robert Lee (USA), He Liangde (CHN)

26 September 1988; 09:00	West Germany	10–7	Italy	Jamsil Indoor Swimming Pool; Referees: Željko Klarić (YUG), Eugeni Asencio (ESP)
26 September 1988; 09:00	Score by quarters: 4–2, 2–3, 2–1, 2–1			Jamsil Indoor Swimming Pool; Referees: Željko Klarić (YUG), Eugeni Asencio (ESP)
26 September 1988; 09:00	Otto, Theismann 3	Goals	Ferretti 3	Jamsil Indoor Swimming Pool; Referees: Željko Klarić (YUG), Eugeni Asencio (ESP)

27 September 1988; 11:30	West Germany	9–8	Soviet Union	Jamsil Indoor Swimming Pool; Referees: Tom Hermstad (USA), Antal Vuszek (HUN)
27 September 1988; 11:30	Score by quarters: 2–4, 3–0, 4–1, 0–3			Jamsil Indoor Swimming Pool; Referees: Tom Hermstad (USA), Antal Vuszek (HUN)
27 September 1988; 11:30	Osselmann 3	Goals	Kotenko, Apanasenko 2	Jamsil Indoor Swimming Pool; Referees: Tom Hermstad (USA), Antal Vuszek (HUN)

Semi-final

30 September 1988; 20:15	Yugoslavia	14–10	West Germany	Jamsil Indoor Swimming Pool; Referees: Fred van Dorp (NED), Pietro Di Stefano (ITA)
30 September 1988; 20:15	Score by quarters: 3–2, 3–3, 3–2, 5–3			Jamsil Indoor Swimming Pool; Referees: Fred van Dorp (NED), Pietro Di Stefano (ITA)
30 September 1988; 20:15	Lušiċ, Milanović 4	Goals	Otto 3	Jamsil Indoor Swimming Pool; Referees: Fred van Dorp (NED), Pietro Di Stefano (ITA)

Bronze medal match

1 October 1988; 16:00	Soviet Union	14–13	West Germany	Jamsil Indoor Swimming Pool; Referees: Fred van Dorp (NED), Jean-Claude Demey (FRA)
1 October 1988; 16:00	Score by quarters: 5–1, 2–6, 4–4, 3–2			Jamsil Indoor Swimming Pool; Referees: Fred van Dorp (NED), Jean-Claude Demey (FRA)
1 October 1988; 16:00	Mshvenieradze 4	Goals	Theismann 4	Jamsil Indoor Swimming Pool; Referees: Fred van Dorp (NED), Jean-Claude Demey (FRA)

== Weightlifting ==
Athlete	Event	Snatch		Clean & jerk		Total	Rank
Athlete	Event	Result	Rank	Result	Rank	Total	Rank
Roland Feldhoffer	90 kg	150.0	10	200.0	4	350.0	7
Peter Immesberger	100 kg	175.0	4	220.0	3	395.0	3rd place, bronze medalist(s)
Maik Nill	100 kg	167.5	8	202.5	10	370.0	10
Eduard Ohlinger	110 kg	175.0	8	NM		DNF	
Frank Seipelt	110 kg	170.0	11	217.5	7	387.5	8
Manfred Nerlinger	+110 kg	190.0	2	240.0	2	430.0	2nd place, silver medalist(s)
Martin Zawieja	+110 kg	182.5	3	232.5	3	415.0	3rd place, bronze medalist(s)

== Wrestling ==
Greco-Roman

Athlete	Event	Group Stage								Final	
Athlete	Event	Opposition Result	Opposition Result	Opposition Result	Opposition Result	Opposition Result	Opposition Result	Opposition Result	Rank	Opposition Result	Rank
Markus Scherer	48 kg	Simkhah (IRI); W 10–5	Tsenov (BUL); L 3–15	Yang (CHN); W 13–4	Maenza (ITA); L 1–15	Did not advance	—N/a		3	Al-Faraj (SYR); L 6–16	6
Rifat Yildiz	57 kg	Chaambi (TUN); W 12–0	Mena (PAN); W 16–0	Sike (HUN); L passivity	Yang (CHN); L 5–8	Did not advance	—N/a		4	Shestakov (URS); L walkover	8
Peter Behl	62 kg	Fernández (ESP); W 15–0	Dietsche (SUI); L passivity	Şahin (TUR); W passivity	Bódi (HUN); L 1–10	—N/a			3	Anderson (USA); W 5–1	5
Claudio Passarelli	68 kg	Abrial (FRA); W 7–0	Zhao (CHN); W 8–1	Sabo (YUG); L 3–4	Kim (KOR); L passivity	Did not advance			6	Did not advance	
Roger Gössner	82 kg	Komáromi (HUN); L passivity	N'Gom (SEN); W fall	Kleven (NOR); W passivity	Fredriksson (SWE); L 1–3	Did not advance		—N/a	5	Did not advance	
Andreas Steinbach	90 kg	Cox (CAN); W 16–0	Bye	Youmbi (CMR); W passivity	Foy (USA); W 15–5	Koskela (FIN); L 1–2	Popov (URS); L 0–3	—N/a	3	Pitschmann (AUT); W passivity	5
Gerhard Himmel	100 kg	Claeson (SWE); W passivity	Sarr (SEN); W fall	Gáspár (HUN); W injury	Bye	Yu (KOR); W 7–0	Georgiev (BUL); W passivity	—N/a	1	Wroński (POL); L 1–3	2nd place, silver medalist(s)
Fritz Gerdsmeier	130 kg	Klauz (HUN); L passivity	Johansson (SWE); L 1–2	Did not advance		—N/a			7	Did not advance	

Freestyle

Athlete	Event	Group Stage								Final	
Athlete	Event	Opposition Result	Opposition Result	Opposition Result	Opposition Result	Opposition Result	Opposition Result	Opposition Result	Rank	Opposition Result	Rank
Reiner Heugabel	48 kg	Sükhbaatar (MGL); W fall	Liang (CHN); W fall	Kumar (IND); W 12–0	Karamchakov (URS); W passivity	Anger (GDR); W passivity	Tsonov (BUL); L 0–3	—N/a	3	Şükrüoğlu (TUR); W passivity	5
Herbert Tutsch	52 kg	Nasir (AFG); L 3–7	Sharif (JOR); W fall	Bye	Bíró (HUN); L fall	Did not advance			5	Did not advance	
Jürgen Scheibe	57 kg	Beloglazov (URS); L 1–4	Ogden (GBR); W 14–3	Holmes (CAN); L 6–8	Did not advance				6	Did not advance	
Jörg Helmdach	62 kg	Kim (KOR); W 8–4	Rincón (COL); W 4–0	Küng (SUI); W 6–0	Sargsyan (URS); L 2–7	Bye	Fallah (IRI); L 0–5	Did not advance	3	Enkhee (MGL); W 5–4	5
Alexander Leipold	68 kg	Satyawan (IND); W 11–1	Kubiak (POL); W 3–2	Carr (USA); L 3–11	Amaraa (MGL); W 5–3	McKay (CAN); L 7–11	Did not advance		4	Yassenov (BUL); W 14–10	7
Reiner Trik	82 kg	Radomski (POL); W 12–9	Schultz (USA); L 1–16	Gençalp (TUR); L 0–8	Did not advance				9	Did not advance	
Bodo Lukowski	90 kg	Tupchi (IRI); L 2–3	Nieć (POL); W passivity	Alabakov (BUL); L 2–3	Did not advance				7	Did not advance	
Wilfried Colling	100 kg	Karadushev (BUL); L 0–2	Pușcașu (ROU); L 0–4	Did not advance				—N/a	9	Did not advance	
Ralf Bremmer	130 kg	Obata (JPN); L 4–8	Luberda (TCH); W fall	Gobejishvili (URS); L passivity	Did not advance		—N/a		4	Sandurski (POL); L 5–7	8
