= Tennis at the 1988 Summer Olympics – Men's doubles =

1988 Olympic tennis tournament

Men's doubles at the Games of the XXIV Olympiad
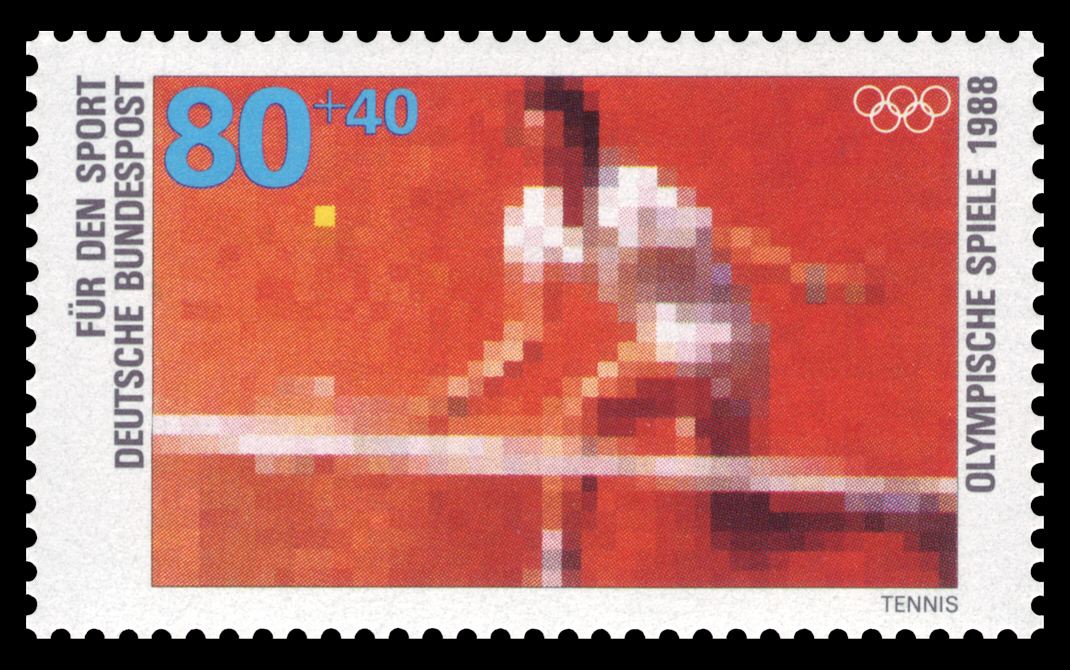
- German stamp commemorating 1988 Olympic tennis
- Venue: Seoul Olympic Park Tennis Center
- Dates: 23 September – 1 October 1988
- Competitors: 31 teams (62 players) from 31 nations

Medalists
1st place, gold medalist(s)		Ken Flach; Robert Seguso; United States
2nd place, silver medalist(s)		Sergio Casal; Emilio Sánchez; Spain
3rd place, bronze medalist(s)		Miloslav Mečíř; Milan Šrejber; Czechoslovakia
3rd place, bronze medalist(s)		Stefan Edberg; Anders Järryd; Sweden

Men's doubles
- Tennis at the 1988 Summer Olympics

Events
Singles	men	women
Doubles	men	women
← 1984 ·	Summer Olympics	· 1992 →

The United States' Ken Flach and Robert Seguso defeated Spain's Sergio Casal and Emilio Sánchez in the final, 6–3, 6–4, 6–7^{(5–7)}, 6–7^{(1–7)}, 9–7 to win the gold medal in Men's Singles tennis at the 1988 Summer Olympics. It was the second consecutive American victory in the event (though tennis had been discontinued from the Olympics in the intervening 64 years) and its record-equaling third gold overall. Czechoslovaka's Miloslav Mečíř and Milan Šrejber and Sweden's Stefan Edberg and Anders Järryd won the bronze medals. It was the first medal in the event for Spain, Sweden, and Czechoslovakia.

The tournament was held from 23 September to 1 October at the Seoul Olympic Park Tennis Center in Seoul, South Korea. There were 62 players (31 pairs) from 31 nations, with the Colombian pair withdrawing. Each nation had only one pair. There was no bronze-medal match.

== Background ==
This was the eighth appearance of men's doubles tennis. The event has been held at every Summer Olympics where tennis has been on the program: from 1896 to 1924 and then from 1988 to the current program. A demonstration event was held in 1968.

The top seed and favorite was the American pair, Ken Flach and Robert Seguso, who had just won their second consecutive Wimbledon title (adding to earlier U.S. and French Open wins.

Brazil, the People's Republic of China, West Germany, Indonesia, Israel, New Zealand, Nigeria, Paraguay, South Korea, the Soviet Union, Yugoslavia, and Zimbabwe each made their debut in the event. Great Britain made its sixth appearance in the event, most of any nation.

== Competition format ==
The competition was a single-elimination tournament. Unlike the pre-hiatus tournaments, there was no bronze-medal match. All matches were best-of-five sets. Tiebreaks were used for any set before the fifth that reached 6–6.

== Schedule ==
All times are Korea Standard Time adjusted for daylight savings (UTC+10)

Date	Time	Round
Friday, 23 September 1988		Round of 32
Monday, 25 September 1988		Round of 16
Tuesday, 27 September 1988		Quarterfinals
Thursday, 29 September 1988		Semifinals
Saturday, 1 October 1988	13:19	Final

== Seeds ==
1. Ken Flach / Robert Seguso (USA) (champions, gold medalists)
2. Sergio Casal / Emilio Sánchez (ESP) (final, silver medalists)
3. Darren Cahill / John Fitzgerald (AUS) (quarterfinals)
4. Guy Forget / Henri Leconte (FRA) (quarterfinals)
5. Stefan Edberg / Anders Järryd (SWE) (semifinals, bronze medalists)
6. Grant Connell / Glenn Michibata (CAN) (first round)
7. Jeremy Bates / Andrew Castle (GBR) (first round)
8. Miloslav Mečíř / Milan Šrejber (TCH) (semifinals, bronze medalists)

== Draw ==
=== Key ===
- Q = Qualifier
- WC = Wild card
- LL = Lucky loser
- Alt = Alternate
- ITF = ITF entry
- PR = Protected ranking
- SR = Special ranking
- SE = Special exempt
- JE = Junior exempt
- JR = Junior Accelerator Programme entrant
- CO = College Accelerator Programme entrant
- NG = Next Gen Accelerator Program entrant
- w/o = Walkover
- r = Retired
- d = Defaulted

=== Finals ===
Semifinals
1	Ken Flach (USA); Robert Seguso (USA)	6	6	6
8	Miloslav Mečíř (TCH); Milan Šrejber (TCH)	2	4	1
5	Stefan Edberg (SWE); Anders Järryd (SWE)	4	6	3	2
2	Sergio Casal (ESP); Emilio Sánchez (ESP)	6	1	6	6

Final (gold-medal match)
1	Ken Flach (USA); Robert Seguso (USA)	6	6	6^{5}	6^{1}	9
2	Sergio Casal (ESP); Emilio Sánchez (ESP)	3	4	7^{7}	7^{7}	7

=== Top half ===
First round
1	K Flach (USA); R Seguso (USA)	6	6	7
Q	S Suharyadi (INA); D Wailan-Walalangi (INA)	3	1	5
L Lavalle (MEX); A Moreno (MEX)	6	3	7^{12}	4	4
Q	G Köves (HUN); L Markovits (HUN)	3	6	6^{10}	6	6
Q	O Casey (IRL); E Collins (IRL)	2	6^{3}	6	5
G Bloom (ISR); A Mansdorf (ISR)	6	7^{7}	4	7
M Christensen (DEN); M Tauson (DEN)	7	6	6^{5}	7
6/Q	G Connell (CAN); G Michibata (CAN)	5	2	7^{7}	5
4	G Forget (FRA); H Leconte (FRA)	6	6	6^{5}	7^{7}
WC	T Mmoh (NGR); N Odizor (NGR)	3	2	7^{7}	6^{5}
R Acioly (BRA); L Mattar (BRA)	4	6	6	6
Q	S Matsuoka (JPN); T Tsuchihashi (JPN)	6	4	2	2
B-S Kim (KOR); J-S Yoo (KOR)	3	6^{5}	2
A Amritraj (IND); V Amritraj (IND)	6	7^{7}	6
LL	S Liu (CHN); K Ma (CHN)	5	1	4
8	M Mečíř (TCH); M Šrejber (TCH)	7	6	6

Second round
1	K Flach (USA); R Seguso (USA)	6	6	6
Q	G Köves (HUN); L Markovits (HUN)	4	4	4
G Bloom (ISR); A Mansdorf (ISR)	5	3	2
M Christensen (DEN); M Tauson (DEN)	7	6	6
4	G Forget (FRA); H Leconte (FRA)	4	7	6	6
R Acioly (BRA); L Mattar (BRA)	6	5	4	1
A Amritraj (IND); V Amritraj (IND)	6	4	6	4	2
8	M Mečíř (TCH); M Šrejber (TCH)	4	6	4	6	6

Quarterfinals
1	K Flach (USA); R Seguso (USA)	6	7	6
M Christensen (DEN); M Tauson (DEN)	4	5	2
4	G Forget (FRA); H Leconte (FRA)	6	6	5	3	7
8	M Mečíř (TCH); M Šrejber (TCH)	3	4	7	6	9

Semifinals
1	K Flach (USA); R Seguso (USA)	6	6	6
8	M Mečíř (TCH); M Šrejber (TCH)	2	4	1

=== Bottom half ===
First round
5	S Edberg (SWE); A Järryd (SWE)	6	4	6	6
E Jelen (FRG); C-U Steeb (FRG)	4	6	4	2
V Caballero (PAR); H Chapacu (PAR)	6	3	3	1
Q	M Gurr (ZIM); P Tuckniss (ZIM)	4	6	6	6
J Frana (ARG); M Jaite (ARG)	4	1	r
B Derlin (NZL); K Evernden (NZL)	6	4
LL	A Bavelas (GRE); G Kalovelonis (GRE)	2	6	1	1
3	D Cahill (AUS); J Fitzgerald (AUS)	6	4	6	6
7	J Bates (GBR); A Castle (GBR)	5	6	3	6^{4}
G Ivanišević (YUG); S Živojinović (YUG)	7	2	6	7^{7}
O Camporese (ITA); D Nargiso (ITA)	6	6^{4}	3	6^{3}
H Günthardt (SUI); J Hlasek (SUI)	3	7^{7}	6	7^{7}
WC	A Antonitsch (AUT); H Skoff (AUT)	w/o
Q	L A González (COL); Á Jordan (COL)
WC	A Olhovskiy (URS); A Volkov (URS)	5	1	2
2	S Casal (ESP); E Sánchez (ESP)	7	6	6

Second round
5	S Edberg (SWE); A Järryd (SWE)	6	6	6
Q	M Gurr (ZIM); P Tuckniss (ZIM)	0	1	4
B Derlin (NZL); K Evernden (NZL)	7^{8}	4	2	6	1
3	D Cahill (AUS); J Fitzgerald (AUS)	6^{6}	6	6	3	6
G Ivanišević (YUG); S Živojinović (YUG)	6	7^{8}	6
H Günthardt (SUI); J Hlasek (SUI)	3	6^{6}	3
WC	A Antonitsch (AUT); H Skoff (AUT)	4	2	1
2	S Casal (ESP); E Sánchez (ESP)	6	6	6

Quarterfinals
5	S Edberg (SWE); A Järryd (SWE)	6	6	6
3	D Cahill (AUS); J Fitzgerald (AUS)	3	4	3
G Ivanišević (YUG); S Živojinović (YUG)	1	6^{3}	3
2	S Casal (ESP); E Sánchez (ESP)	6	7^{7}	6

Semifinals
5	S Edberg (SWE); A Järryd (SWE)	4	6	3	2
2	S Casal (ESP); E Sánchez (ESP)	6	1	6	6
