= Tennis at the 1988 Summer Olympics – Men's singles =

Olympic tennis event

Men's singles
- Tennis at the 1988 Summer Olympics

Final
- Champion: (Czechoslovakia) Miloslav Mečíř
- Runner-up: (United States) Tim Mayotte
- Score: 3–6, 6–2, 6–4, 6–2

Events
Singles	men	women
Doubles	men	women
- Summer Olympics

Men's singles tennis at the Games of the XXIV Olympiad
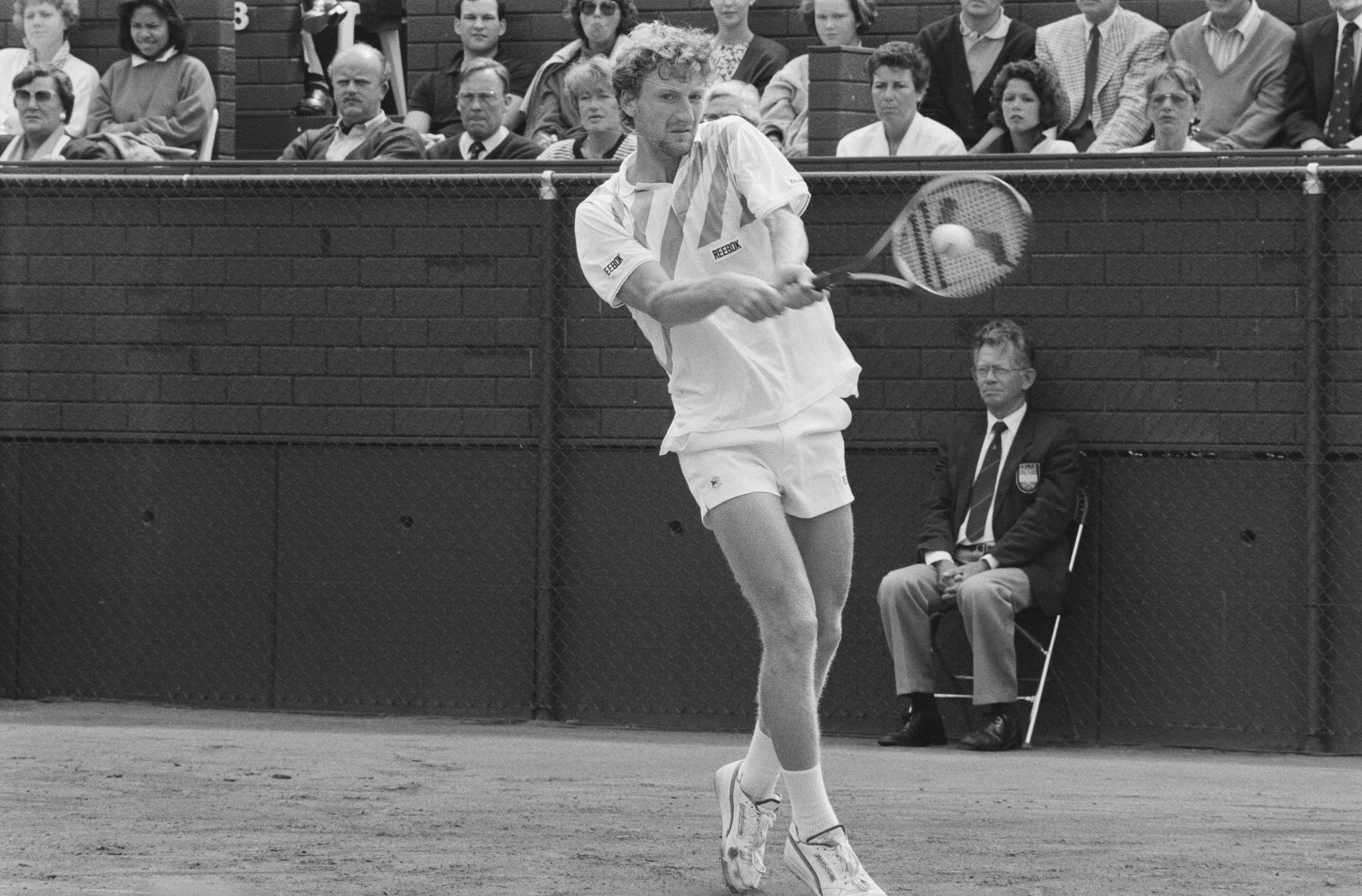
- Miloslav Mečíř (1987)
- Venue: Seoul Olympic Park Tennis Center, Seoul
- Dates: 20 September–1 October 1988
- Competitors: 64 from 32 nations

Medalists
1st place, gold medalist(s)		Miloslav Mečíř; Czechoslovakia
2nd place, silver medalist(s)		Tim Mayotte; United States
3rd place, bronze medalist(s)		Stefan Edberg; Sweden
3rd place, bronze medalist(s)		Brad Gilbert; United States

Czechoslovakia's Miloslav Mečíř defeated the United States' Tim Mayotte in the final, 3–6, 6–2, 6–4, 6–2, to win the gold medal in Men's Singles tennis at the 1988 Summer Olympics. It was Czechoslovakia's first medal at the event. The United States' Brad Gilbert and Sweden's Stefan Edberg won the bronze medals. It was Sweden's first men's singles Olympic medal.

The tournament was held at the Seoul Olympic Park Tennis Center in Seoul, South Korea. Tennis was officially re-introduced as an official sport in the 1988 Summer Olympics, after being held as a demonstration sport in the 1968 Olympic Games and 1984 Olympic Games. It was discontinued from being an official sport after the 1924 Olympic Games before its re-introduction. There were 64 competitors from 32 nations. Nations were limited to three players each (down from four before tennis's Olympic hiatus).

== Background ==
This was the eighth (medal) appearance of the men's singles tennis event. The event has been held at every Summer Olympics where tennis has been on the program: from 1896 to 1924 and then from 1988 to the current program. Demonstration events were held in 1968 and 1984.

Number one seed and the favorite was Stefan Edberg of Sweden, the winner of the 1984 demonstration event as well as the reigning Wimbledon champion.

Bermuda, Brazil, West Germany, Haiti, Israel, the Ivory Coast, New Zealand, Nigeria, Paraguay, Poland, South Korea, the Soviet Union, and Zimbabwe each made their debut in the event. France made its seventh appearance, most among all nations, having missed only the 1904 event.

== Competition format ==
The competition was a single-elimination tournament. Unlike previous Olympic tournaments, no bronze-medal match was held. All matches were best-of-five sets. The 12-point tie-breaker, common by 1988, was used in the Olympics for the first time.

== Schedule ==
All times are Korea Standard Time adjusted for daylight savings (UTC+10)

Date	Time	Round
Tuesday, 20 September 1988; Wednesday, 21 September 1988		Round of 64
Thursday, 22 September 1988		Round of 32
Saturday, 24 September 1988		Round of 16
Monday, 26 September 1988		Quarterfinals
Wednesday, 28 September 1988		Semifinals
Friday, 30 September 1988	11:12	Final

== Seeds ==
1. Stefan Edberg (SWE) (semifinals, bronze medalist)
2. Tim Mayotte (USA) (finals, silver medalist)
3. Miloslav Mečíř (TCH) (champion, gold medalist)
4. Henri Leconte (FRA) (second round)
5. Brad Gilbert (USA) (semifinals, bronze medalist)
6. Emilio Sánchez (ESP) (second round)
7. Anders Järryd (SWE) (third round)
8. Andrei Chesnokov (URS) (first round)
9. Darren Cahill (AUS) (second round)
10. Jakob Hlasek (SUI) (third round)
11. Ronald Agénor (HAI) (first round)
12. Amos Mansdorf (ISR) (third round)
13. Martín Jaite (ARG) (quarterfinals)
14. John Fitzgerald (AUS) (first round)
15. Slobodan Živojinović (YUG) (second round)
16. Luiz Mattar (BRA) (first round)

== Draw ==
Key

- Q = Qualifier
- WC = Wild card
- LL = Lucky loser
- Alt = Alternate
- ITF = ITF entry
- PR = Protected ranking
- SR = Special ranking
- SE = Special exempt
- JE = Junior exempt
- JR = Junior Accelerator Programme entrant
- CO = College Accelerator Programme entrant
- NG = Next Gen Accelerator Program entrant
- w/o = Walkover
- r = Retired
- d = Defaulted

=== Finals ===
Quarterfinals
1	Stefan Edberg (SWE)	6	7	6
Paolo Canè (ITA)	1	5	4
3	Miloslav Mečíř (TCH)	3	7^{7}	6	6
Michiel Schapers (NED)	6	6^{2}	2	4
5/WC	Brad Gilbert (USA)	5	6	7^{7}	6
13	Martín Jaite (ARG)	7	1	6^{1}	3
Carl-Uwe Steeb (FRG)	6^{4}	5	3
2	Tim Mayotte (USA)	7^{7}	7	6

Semifinals
1	Stefan Edberg (SWE)	6	0	6	4	2
3	Miloslav Mečíř (TCH)	3	6	1	6	6
5/WC	Brad Gilbert (USA)	4	4	3
2	Tim Mayotte (USA)	6	6	6

Final (gold-medal match)
3	Miloslav Mečíř (TCH)	3	6	6	6
2	Tim Mayotte (USA)	6	2	4	2

=== Top half ===
==== Section 1 ====
First round
1	S Edberg (SWE)	7^{7}	6	6
WC	H Skoff (AUT)	6^{3}	2	3
Q	T Tsuchihashi (JPN)	6^{5}	2	4
Q	A Moreno (MEX)	7^{7}	6	6
Q	Z Ali (IND)	6	6	6
V Caballero (PAR)	3	2	4
Q	S Alger (BER)	3	4	2
10	J Hlasek (SUI)	6	6	6
14	J Fitzgerald (AUS)	4	6	2	2
Q	G Connell (CAN)	6	4	6	6
Q	S Abdullahi (NGR)	2	5	3
Q	J Sánchez (ESP)	6	7	6
P Canè (ITA)	6	7^{7}	4	6
M Šrejber (TCH)	3	6^{4}	6	3
Q	S Matsuoka (JPN)	3	4	3
6	E Sánchez (ESP)	6	6	6

Second round
1	S Edberg (SWE)	6	7^{7}	6
Q	A Moreno (MEX)	2	6^{2}	0
Q	Z Ali (IND)	4	5	5
10	J Hlasek (SUI)	6	7	7
Q	G Connell (CAN)	4	4	2
Q	J Sánchez (ESP)	6	6	6
P Canè (ITA)	7	6	6^{4}	6
6	E Sánchez (ESP)	5	3	7^{7}	4

Third round
1	S Edberg (SWE)	6	6	7^{7}
10	J Hlasek (SUI)	2	4	6^{3}
Q	J Sánchez (ESP)	6^{1}	6	1	2
P Canè (ITA)	7^{7}	4	6	6

Quarterfinals
1	S Edberg (SWE)	6	7	6
P Canè (ITA)	1	5	4

==== Section 2 ====
First round
3	M Mečíř (TCH)	5	6	6	7^{8}
E Jelen (FRG)	7	1	2	6^{6}
G Bloom (ISR)	6	4	6	2	7
J Bates (GBR)	4	6	3	6	9
Q	O Camporese (ITA)	2	0	3
G Forget (FRA)	6	6	6
M Christensen (DEN)	5	2	4
15	S Živojinović (YUG)	7	6	6
11/WC	R Agénor (HAI)	6	3	2	1	r
L Lavalle (MEX)	3	6	6	2
S Casal (ESP)	6	6	6
Q	M Gurr (ZIM)	2	3	1
Q	W Kowalski (POL)	2	4	4
Q	T Mmoh (NGR)	6	6	6
M Schapers (NED)	6	5	6	6
8/WC	A Chesnokov (URS)	3	7	0	2

Second round
3	M Mečíř (TCH)	6	4	6	6
J Bates (GBR)	3	6	1	4
G Forget (FRA)	7	7^{8}	6
15	S Živojinović (YUG)	5	6^{6}	2
L Lavalle (MEX)	3	4	6^{2}
S Casal (ESP)	6	6	7^{7}
Q	T Mmoh (NGR)	6	3	1	6	1
M Schapers (NED)	4	6	6	4	6

Third round
3	M Mečíř (TCH)	7^{7}	6	7
G Forget (FRA)	6^{1}	3	5
S Casal (ESP)	4	6	6	3	4
M Schapers (NED)	6	4	2	6	6

Quarterfinals
3	M Mečíř (TCH)	3	7^{7}	6	6
M Schapers (NED)	6	6^{2}	2	4

=== Bottom half ===
==== Section 3 ====
First round
5/WC	B Gilbert (USA)	6	7	6
M Tauson (DEN)	2	5	1
Q	A Cherkasov (URS)	6	6	6
H Chapacú (PAR)	0	0	1
WC	N Odizor (NGR)	4	3	2
R Seguso (USA)	6	6	6
Q	A Antonitsch (AUT)	2	4	7^{7}	2
9/Q	D Cahill (AUS)	6	6	6^{2}	6
13	M Jaite (ARG)	6	6	6
Q	C Pridham (CAN)	1	3	2
Q	S Perkiss (ISR)	2	6	4	4
Q	J Frana (ARG)	6	4	6	6
B-S Kim (KOR)	7	3	6	6^{3}	6
LL	G Kalovelonis (GRE)	5	6	2	7^{7}	3
V Amritraj (IND)	6	4	3	6	3
4	H Leconte (FRA)	4	6	6	3	6

Second round
5/WC	B Gilbert (USA)	6	1	6	6
Q	A Cherkasov (URS)	4	6	1	2
R Seguso (USA)	6	7^{7}	6^{8}	6
9/Q	D Cahill (AUS)	3	6^{3}	7^{10}	2
13	M Jaite (ARG)	6	6	6
Q	J Frana (ARG)	2	4	2
B-S Kim (KOR)	4	7	6	3	7
4	H Leconte (FRA)	6	5	3	6	5

Third round
5/WC	B Gilbert (USA)	6	6	6
R Seguso (USA)	2	1	2
13	M Jaite (ARG)	6	6	6
B-S Kim (KOR)	4	1	3

Quarterfinals
5/WC	B Gilbert (USA)	5	6	7^{7}	6
13	M Jaite (ARG)	7	1	6^{1}	3

==== Section 4 ====
First round
7/WC	A Järryd (SWE)	7^{10}	4	7	7
Q	M Laurendeau (CAN)	6^{8}	6	5	5
Q	C N'Goran (CIV)	7^{11}	6	2	6^{3}	5
A Castle (GBR)	6^{9}	3	6	7^{7}	7
Q	C-U Steeb (FRG)	7	6	6
Q	A Volkov (URS)	5	4	3
W Masur (AUS)	6	6	4	6^{7}	6
16	L Mattar (BRA)	4	4	6	7^{9}	4
12	A Mansdorf (ISR)	6	6	7
Q	J-S Yoo (KOR)	2	4	5
K Evernden (NZL)	7^{7}	6	6
Q	G Ivanišević (YUG)	6^{0}	3	3
D Nargiso (ITA)	4	2	7^{7}	7^{7}	8
F Maciel (MEX)	6	6	6^{2}	6^{3}	6
D-W Song (KOR)	3	3	4
2	T Mayotte (USA)	6	6	6

Second round
7/WC	A Järryd (SWE)	6	6	6
A Castle (GBR)	0	3	1
Q	C-U Steeb (FRG)	6	5	6	1	7
W Masur (AUS)	3	7	3	6	5
12	A Mansdorf (ISR)	6	3	6	7
K Evernden (NZL)	4	6	1	5
D Nargiso (ITA)	6	2	4	0
2	T Mayotte (USA)	2	6	6	6

Third round
7/WC	A Järryd (SWE)	6	5	3	5
C-U Steeb (FRG)	2	7	6	7
12	A Mansdorf (ISR)	4	2	4
2	T Mayotte (USA)	6	6	6

Quarterfinals
C-U Steeb (FRG)	6^{4}	5	3
2	T Mayotte (USA)	7^{7}	7	6
