= Tennis at the 1988 Summer Olympics – Women's doubles =

Women's doubles
- Tennis at the 1988 Summer Olympics

Events
Singles	men	women
Doubles	men	women
- Summer Olympics

The United States' Zina Garrison and Pam Shriver defeated Czechoslovakia's Jana Novotná and Helena Suková in the final, 4–6, 6–2, 10–8 to win the gold medal in women's doubles tennis at the 1988 Summer Olympics. Australia's Elizabeth Smylie and Wendy Turnbull and West Germany's Steffi Graf and Claudia Kohde-Kilsch won the bronze medals.

The tournament was held at the Seoul Olympic Park Tennis Center in Seoul, South Korea. Tennis was officially re-introduced as an official sport in the 1988 Summer Olympics, after being held as a demonstration sport in the 1968 Summer Olympics and 1984 Summer Olympics. It was discontinued from being an official sport after the 1924 Summer Olympics before its re-introduction. There were 28 competitors (14 teams) from 14 countries.

== Medalists ==
Gold	Zina Garrison / Pam Shriver; United States
Silver	Jana Novotná / Helena Suková; Czechoslovakia
Bronze	Elizabeth Smylie / Wendy Turnbull; Australia
Bronze	Steffi Graf / Claudia Kohde-Kilsch; West Germany

== Seeds ==
The top two seeded teams received byes into the quarterfinals.

1. Zina Garrison / Pam Shriver (USA) (champions, gold medalists)
2. Steffi Graf / Claudia Kohde-Kilsch (FRG) (semifinals, bronze medalists)
3. Jana Novotná / Helena Suková (TCH) (final, silver medalists)
4. Larisa Savchenko / Natasha Zvereva (URS) (quarterfinals)

== Draw ==
Key

- Q = Qualifier
- WC = Wild card
- LL = Lucky loser
- Alt = Alternate
- ITF = ITF entry
- PR = Protected ranking
- SR = Special ranking
- SE = Special exempt
- JE = Junior exempt
- JR = Junior Accelerator Programme entrant
- CO = College Accelerator Programme entrant
- NG = Next Gen Accelerator Program entrant
- w/o = Walkover
- r = Retired
- d = Defaulted

First round
I Demongeot (FRA); N Tauziat (FRA)	6	4	6
S Gomer (GBR); C Wood (GBR)	2	6	1
4	L Savchenko (URS); N Zvereva (URS)	6	6
X Escobedo (MEX); C Hernández-Salas (MEX)	2	1
K Maleeva (BUL); M Maleeva-Fragnière (BUL)	2	6	0
E Smylie (AUS); W Turnbull (AUS)	6	3	6
E Inoue (JPN); K Okamoto (JPN)	6	6^{4}	8
S Cecchini (ITA); R Reggi (ITA)	3	7^{7}	6
I-S Kim (KOR); J-M Lee (KOR)	2	6^{4}
3	J Novotná (TCH); H Suková (TCH)	6	7^{7}
C Bassett-Seguso (CAN); J Hetherington (CAN)	7^{10}	5	20
M Paz (ARG); G Sabatini (ARG)	6^{8}	7	18

Quarterfinals
1	Z Garrison (USA); P Shriver (USA)	7	6
I Demongeot (FRA); N Tauziat (FRA)	5	2
4	L Savchenko (URS); N Zvereva (URS)	3	2
E Smylie (AUS); W Turnbull (AUS)	6	6
E Inoue (JPN); K Okamoto (JPN)	3	2
3	J Novotná (TCH); H Suková (TCH)	6	6
C Bassett-Seguso (CAN); J Hetherington (CAN)	3	6	2
2	S Graf (FRG); C Kohde-Kilsch (FRG)	6	3	6

Semifinals
1	Z Garrison (USA); P Shriver (USA)	7^{7}	6
E Smylie (AUS); W Turnbull (AUS)	6^{5}	4
3	J Novotná (TCH); H Suková (TCH)	7	6
2	S Graf (FRG); C Kohde-Kilsch (FRG)	5	3

Final
1	Z Garrison (USA); P Shriver (USA)	4	6	10
3	J Novotná (TCH); H Suková (TCH)	6	2	8
