= Wiegel =

Wiegel is a German surname. Notable people with the surname include:

- Andreas Wiegel (born 1991), German professional footballer
- Hans Wiegel (1941–2025), Dutch politician and businessman
- Torsten Wiegel (born 1967), German swimmer

== See also ==
- Wiegele, people with this name
