= Tennis at the 1988 Summer Olympics – Women's singles =

Women's singles
- Tennis at the 1988 Summer Olympics

Final
- Champion: Steffi Graf (FRG)
- Runner-up: Gabriela Sabatini (ARG)
- Score: 6–3, 6–3

Events
Singles	men	women
Doubles	men	women
- Summer Olympics

Women's singles tennis at the Games of the XXIV Olympiad
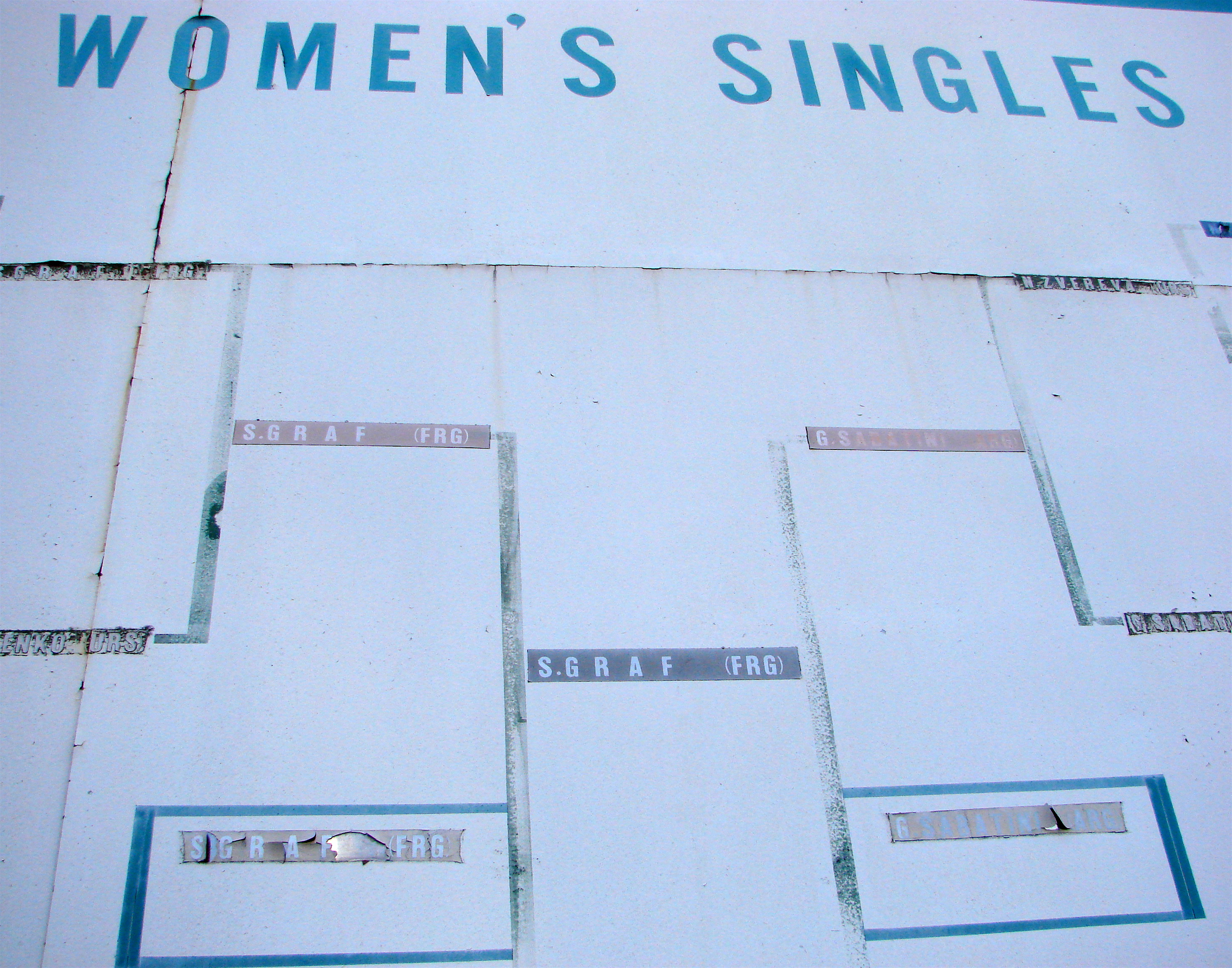
- Women's singles results board
- Venue: Seoul Olympic Park Tennis Center, Seoul
- Dates: 23 September–1 October 1988
- Competitors: 48 from 26 nations

Medalists
1st place, gold medalist(s)		Steffi Graf; West Germany
2nd place, silver medalist(s)		Gabriela Sabatini; Argentina
3rd place, bronze medalist(s)		Zina Garrison; United States
3rd place, bronze medalist(s)		Manuela Maleeva-Fragnière; Bulgaria

West Germany's Steffi Graf defeated Argentina's Gabriela Sabatini in the final, 6–3, 6–3 to win the gold medal in Women's Singles tennis at the 1988 Summer Olympics. With the win, Graf completed the Golden Slam, having also won all four majors earlier in 1988. The final was a rematch of the U.S. Open final earlier that year, where Graf also prevailed to complete the Grand Slam. The United States' Zina Garrison and Bulgaria's Manuela Maleeva-Fragnière won the bronze medals. It was the first medal in the event for West Germany, Argentina, and Bulgaria (each making their debut in the event), while the United States had previously earned medals in both of its prior appearances in 1900 and 1924.

The tournament was held from 23 September to 1 October at the Seoul Olympic Park Tennis Center. There were 48 competitors from 26 nations. Each nation had only one pair. There was no bronze-medal match.

== Background ==
This was the sixth appearance of the women's singles tennis. A women's event was held only once during the first three Games (only men's tennis was played in 1896 and 1904), but has been held at every Olympics for which there was a tennis tournament since 1908. Tennis was not a medal sport from 1928 to 1984, though there were demonstration events in 1968 and 1984.

West Germany's Steffi Graf had just become the fifth person to win the Grand Slam and was also the unofficial defending Olympic champion, having won the 1984 demonstration event (the official reigning gold medalist from 1924, Helen Wills, had retired from tennis 50 years earlier).

Of the 26 competing nations, 18 made their debut in the event. France and Great Britain each made their fifth appearance, tied for most among nations to that point.

== Competition format ==
The competition was a single-elimination tournament. Unlike previous Olympic tournaments, no bronze-medal match was held. All matches were best-of-three sets. The 12-point tie-breaker, common by 1988, was used in the Olympics for the first time.

== Schedule ==
All times are Korea Standard Time adjusted for daylight savings (UTC+10)

Date	Time	Round
Friday, 23 September 1988		Round of 64
Saturday, 24 September 1988		Round of 32
Sunday, 25 September 1988		Round of 16
Tuesday, 27 September 1988		Quarterfinals
Thursday, 29 September 1988		Semifinals
Saturday, 1 October 1988	11:13	Final

== Seeds ==
All seeds received a bye to the second round.

1. Steffi Graf (FRG) (champion, gold medalist)
2. Chris Evert (USA) (third round)
3. Gabriela Sabatini (ARG) (final, silver medalist)
4. Pam Shriver (USA) (quarterfinals)
5. Helena Suková (TCH) (second round)
6. Natasha Zvereva (URS) (quarterfinals)
7. Manuela Maleeva-Fragnière (BUL) (semifinals, bronze medalist)
8. Zina Garrison (USA) (semifinals, bronze medalist)
9. Claudia Kohde-Kilsch (FRG) (second round)
10. Katerina Maleeva (BUL) (third round)
11. Larisa Savchenko (URS) (quarterfinals)
12. Sylvia Hanika (FRG) (third round)

== Draw ==
Key

- Q = Qualifier
- WC = Wild card
- LL = Lucky loser
- Alt = Alternate
- ITF = ITF entry
- PR = Protected ranking
- SR = Special ranking
- SE = Special exempt
- JE = Junior exempt
- JR = Junior Accelerator Programme entrant
- CO = College Accelerator Programme entrant
- NG = Next Gen Accelerator Program entrant
- w/o = Walkover
- r = Retired
- d = Defaulted

=== Finals ===
Quarterfinals
1	Steffi Graf (FRG)	6	4	6
11	Larisa Savchenko (URS)	2	6	3
4	Pam Shriver (USA)	2	3
8	Zina Garrison (USA)	6	6
6	Natasha Zvereva (URS)	4	3
3	Gabriela Sabatini (ARG)	6	6
7	Manuela Maleeva-Fragnière (BUL)	6	6
Raffaella Reggi (ITA)	3	4

Semifinals
1	Steffi Graf (FRG)	6	6
8	Zina Garrison (USA)	2	0
3	Gabriela Sabatini (ARG)	6	6
7	Manuela Maleeva-Fragnière (BUL)	1	2

Final (gold-medal match)
1	Steffi Graf (FRG)	6	6
3	Gabriela Sabatini (ARG)	3	3

=== Top half ===
==== Section 1 ====
First round
R Rajchrtová (TCH)	5	5
Q	L Meskhi (URS)	7	7
LL	C Suire (FRA)	6	3	6
Y Basuki (INA)	3	6	0
S Gomer (GBR)	4	7	6
B Cordwell (NZL)	6	5	2
I-S Kim (KOR)	6	3	7
WC	E Inoue (JPN)	3	6	5

Second round
1	S Graf (FRG)	7	6
Q	L Meskhi (URS)	5	1
LL	C Suire (FRA)	7	4	7
Q	J-M Lee (KOR)	5	6	5
11	L Savchenko (URS)	6^{3}	7	9
S Gomer (GBR)	7	6^{3}	7
I-S Kim (KOR)	6	4	6
5	H Suková (TCH)	2	6	2

Third round
1	S Graf (FRG)	6	6
LL	C Suire (FRA)	3	0
11	L Savchenko (URS)	6	7
I-S Kim (KOR)	3	6^{4}

Quarterfinals
1	S Graf (FRG)	6	4	6
11	L Savchenko (URS)	2	6	3

==== Section 2 ====
First round
J Hetherington (CAN)	6	6
Q	I Berger (ISR)	1	4
H Kelesi (CAN)	5	5
Q	G Miró (BRA)	7	7
Q	I Demongeot (FRA)	4	3
J Novotná (TCH)	6	6
Q	B Paulus (AUT)	7	6
B Fulco (ARG)	6^{5}	4

Second round
4	P Shriver (USA)	6	6
J Hetherington (CAN)	2	3
Q	G Miró (BRA)	5	1
10	K Maleeva (BUL)	7	6
J Novotná (TCH)	4	3
Q	B Paulus (AUT)	6	6
Q	C Hernández Salas (MEX)	1	4
8	Z Garrison (USA)	6	6

Third round
4	P Shriver (USA)	6	3	6
10	K Maleeva (BUL)	3	6	2
Q	B Paulus (AUT)	5	2
8	Z Garrison (USA)	7	6

Quarterfinals
4	P Shriver (USA)	2	3
8	Z Garrison (USA)	6	6

=== Bottom half ===
==== Section 3 ====
First round
A Minter (AUS)	6	6
Q	X Escobedo (MEX)	1	3
W Turnbull (AUS)	6	6
C Wood (GBR)	1	3
W Bouchabou (ALG)	0	1
T Scheuer-Larsen (DEN)	6	6
A Sánchez Vicario (ESP)	4	2
S Goleš (YUG)	6	6

Second round
6	N Zvereva (URS)	6	3	6
A Minter (AUS)	4	6	1
W Turnbull (AUS)	4	3
T Scheuer-Larsen (DEN)	6	6
12	S Hanika (FRG)	6	6
Q	J Muir (ZIM)	1	1
S Goleš (YUG)	1	0
3	G Sabatini (ARG)	6	6

Third round
6	N Zvereva (URS)	6	6
T Scheuer-Larsen (DEN)	1	2
12	S Hanika (FRG)	6	4	2
3	G Sabatini (ARG)	1	6	6

Quarterfinals
6	N Zvereva (URS)	4	3
3	G Sabatini (ARG)	6	6

==== Section 4 ====
First round
M Paz (ARG)	7	6
Q	O Tsarbopoulou (GRE)	6^{7}	3
Q	K Okamoto (JPN)	6^{3}	5
WC	C Lindqvist (SWE)	7	7
N Tauziat (FRA)	7	6
C Bassett-Seguso (CAN)	6^{5}	1
E Smylie (AUS)	6^{3}	0
R Reggi (ITA)	7	6

Second round
7	M Maleeva-Fragnière (BUL)	6	6
M Paz (ARG)	1	2
WC	C Lindqvist (SWE)	2	6	6
N Tauziat (FRA)	6	3	4
9	C Kohde-Kilsch (FRG)	6	6^{3}	3
R Reggi (ITA)	4	7	6
WC	S Cecchini (ITA)	2	2
2	C Evert (USA)	6	6

Third round
7	M Maleeva-Fragnière (BUL)	6	6
WC	C Lindqvist (SWE)	1	0
R Reggi (ITA)	2	6	6
2	C Evert (USA)	6	4	1

Quarterfinals
7	M Maleeva-Fragnière (BUL)	6	6
R Reggi (ITA)	3	4
