= Swimming at the 1988 Summer Olympics – Men's 50 metre freestyle =

Men's 50 metre freestyle at the Games of the XXIV Olympiad
- Venue: Jamsil Indoor Swimming Pool
- Date: 24 September 1988 (heats & finals)
- Competitors: 71 from 44 nations
- Winning time: 22.14 WR

Medalists
| 1st place, gold medalist(s) | | Matt Biondi | United States |
| 2nd place, silver medalist(s) | | Tom Jager | United States |
| 3rd place, bronze medalist(s) | | Gennadiy Prigoda | Soviet Union |

The inaugural men's 50-metre freestyle event at the 1988 Summer Olympics took place on 24 September at the Jamsil Indoor Swimming Pool in Seoul, South Korea.

U.S. swimmer Matt Biondi demolished a new world record to become the event's first ever Olympic champion. He threw down a scorching time in 22.14 to add a fourth gold and sixth medal to his Olympic hardware, and to slice 0.04 seconds off the record set by South Africa's Peter Williams. Starting the race with a fastest reaction, Biondi's rival and teammate Tom Jager faded down the stretch to pick up the silver in 22.36. Meanwhile, Soviet Union's Gennadiy Prigoda edged out Swiss swimmer Dano Halsall by 12-hundredths of a second to take home the bronze in 22.71.

== Records ==
Prior to this competition, the existing world and Olympic records were as follows.

| World record | Peter Williams (RSA) | 22.18 | Indianapolis, United States | 10 April 1988 |
| Olympic record | Inaugural event | — | — | — |

The following records were established during the competition:

| Date | Round | Name | Nationality | Time | Record |
|---|---|---|---|---|---|
| 24 September | Heat 8 | Matt Biondi | United States | 22.39 | OR |
| 24 September | Final A | Matt Biondi | United States | 22.14 | WR |

== Competition format ==
The competition consisted of two rounds: heats and finals. The swimmers with the best 8 times in the heats advanced to final A, where they competed for the top 8 places. The swimmers with the next 8 times in the heats swam in final B, for ninth through the sixteenth place. Swim-offs were used as necessary to determine advancement.

== Results ==
=== Heats ===
Rule: The eight fastest swimmers advance to final A, while the next eight to final B.

| Rank | Heat | Name | Nationality | Time | Notes |
|---|---|---|---|---|---|
| 1 | 8 | Matt Biondi | United States | 22.39 | Q, OR |
| 2 | 9 | Gennadiy Prigoda | Soviet Union | 22.57 | Q |
| 3 | 7 | Dano Halsall | Switzerland | 22.61 | Q, NR |
| 3 | 9 | Tom Jager | United States | 22.61 | Q |
| 5 | 7 | Volodymyr Tkachenko | Soviet Union | 22.81 | Q |
| 6 | 7 | Frank Henter | West Germany | 22.98 | Q |
| 7 | 8 | Andrew Baildon | Australia | 22.99 | Q |
| 8 | 8 | Stéfan Voléry | Switzerland | 23.04 | Q |
| 9 | 9 | Ang Peng Siong | Singapore | 23.08 | q, NR |
| 10 | 8 | Per Johansson | Sweden | 23.12 | q |
| 11 | 9 | Stephan Güsgen | West Germany | 23.22 | q |
| 11 | 7 | Stéphan Caron | France | 23.22 | q, WD |
| 13 | 9 | Shen Jianqiang | China | 23.41 | q |
| 13 | 9 | Tsvetan Golomeev | Bulgaria | 23.41 | q, WD |
| 15 | 4 | Mark Andrews | Canada | 23.44 | q, NR |
| 16 | 8 | Göran Titus | Sweden | 23.44 | q |
| 17 | 8 | Hilton Woods | Netherlands Antilles | 23.46 | q |
| 18 | 6 | Feng Qiangbiao | China | 23.47 | qSO |
| 18 | 6 | Christophe Kalfayan | France | 23.47 | qSO |
| 20 | 7 | Vagn Høgholm | Denmark | 23.50 | |
| 20 | 9 | Hans Kroes | Netherlands | 23.50 | |
| 22 | 7 | Mark Foster | Great Britain | 23.51 | |
| 23 | 7 | Petr Kladiva | Czechoslovakia | 23.53 | |
| 24 | 5 | Manuel Guzmán | Puerto Rico | 23.61 | |
| 25 | 6 | Mike Fibbens | Great Britain | 23.67 | |
| 26 | 8 | Peter Rohde | Denmark | 23.70 | |
| 27 | 6 | Thomas Stachewicz | Australia | 23.72 | |
| 28 | 6 | Yves Clausse | Luxembourg | 23.99 | |
| 29 | 8 | Rodrigo González | Mexico | 24.01 | |
| 30 | 6 | Paulo Trindade | Portugal | 24.02 | |
| 31 | 5 | Sérgio Esteves | Portugal | 24.24 | |
| 32 | 1 | Garvin Ferguson | Bahamas | 24.25 | NR |
| 33 | 7 | José Moreira | Brazil | 24.26 | |
| 33 | 4 | Joseph Eric Buhain | Philippines | 24.26 | NR |
| 35 | 5 | Li Khai Kam | Hong Kong | 24.30 | |
| 36 | 6 | Markus Opatril | Austria | 24.32 | |
| 37 | 5 | Jorge Fernandes | Brazil | 24.40 | |
| 38 | 6 | Alexander Pilhatsch | Austria | 24.42 | |
| 39 | 5 | Michael Wright | Hong Kong | 24.47 | |
| 40 | 5 | Magnús Ólafsson | Iceland | 24.50 | |
| 41 | 4 | Richard Sam Bera | Indonesia | 24.63 | NR |
| 42 | 5 | Mohamed El-Azoul | Egypt | 24.64 | |
| 42 | 4 | Murat Tahir | Turkey | 24.64 | |
| 44 | 4 | Hans Foerster | Virgin Islands | 24.72 | |
| 45 | 6 | Urbano Zea | Mexico | 24.86 | |
| 45 | 3 | Oon Jin Gee | Singapore | 24.86 | |
| 47 | 3 | Ronald Pickard | Virgin Islands | 25.01 | |
| 48 | 5 | Mohamed Hassan | Egypt | 25.11 | |
| 49 | 1 | Paul Yelle | Barbados | 25.15 | |
| 50 | 4 | Hakan Eskioğlu | Turkey | 25.24 | |
| 51 | 3 | Chiang Chi-li | Chinese Taipei | 25.26 | |
| 52 | 3 | Vaughan Smith | Zimbabwe | 25.29 | |
| 53 | 3 | Graham Thompson | Zimbabwe | 25.38 | |
| 54 | 3 | Song Kwang-sun | South Korea | 25.40 | |
| 55 | 3 | Wirmandi Sugriat | Indonesia | 25.55 | |
| 56 | 3 | Bruno N'Diaye | Senegal | 25.63 | |
| 57 | 2 | Warren Sorby | Fiji | 25.64 | |
| 58 | 2 | Pablo Barahona | Honduras | 25.79 | |
| 59 | 1 | Sergio Fafitine | Mozambique | 25.97 | |
| 60 | 2 | Plutarco Castellanos | Honduras | 26.00 | |
| 61 | 2 | Hasan Al-Shammari | Kuwait | 26.27 | |
| 62 | 2 | Jason Chute | Fiji | 26.46 | |
| 63 | 2 | Michele Piva | San Marino | 26.60 | |
| 63 | 2 | Ahmad Faraj | United Arab Emirates | 26.60 | |
| 65 | 2 | Trevor Ncala | Swaziland | 26.88 | |
| 66 | 1 | Filippo Piva | San Marino | 26.96 | |
| 67 | 1 | Amine El-Domyati | Lebanon | 27.34 | |
| 68 | 1 | Mubarak Faraj Bilal | United Arab Emirates | 27.60 | |
| 69 | 1 | Yul Mark Du Pont | Swaziland | 27.93 | |
| | 4 | Pedro Lima | Angola | DSQ | |
| | 4 | Mouhamed Diop | Senegal | DSQ | |

==== Swimoff ====
| Rank | Lane | Name | Nationality | Time | Notes |
|---|---|---|---|---|---|
| 1 | 4 | Feng Qiangbiao | China | 23.28 | q, WD |
| 2 | 5 | Christophe Kalfayan | France | 23.37 | q |

=== Finals ===
==== Final B ====
| Rank | Lane | Name | Nationality | Time | Notes |
|---|---|---|---|---|---|
| 9 | 7 | Goran Titus | Sweden | 23.28 | |
| 10 | 5 | Per Johansson | Sweden | 23.37 | |
| 11 | 4 | Ang Peng Siong | Singapore | 23.39 | |
| 12 | 6 | Shen Jianqiang | China | 23.40 | |
| 13 | 8 | Christophe Kalfayan | France | 23.45 | |
| 14 | 3 | Stephan Güsgen | West Germany | 23.55 | |
| 15 | 2 | Mark Andrews | Canada | 23.64 | |
| 16 | 1 | Hilton Woods | Netherlands Antilles | 23.65 | |

==== Final A ====
| Rank | Lane | Name | Nationality | Time | Notes |
|---|---|---|---|---|---|
| 1st place, gold medalist(s) | 4 | Matt Biondi | United States | 22.14 | WR |
| 2nd place, silver medalist(s) | 6 | Tom Jager | United States | 22.36 | |
| 3rd place, bronze medalist(s) | 5 | Gennadiy Prigoda | Soviet Union | 22.71 | |
| 4 | 3 | Dano Halsall | Switzerland | 22.83 | |
| 5 | 8 | Stéfan Voléry | Switzerland | 22.84 | |
| 6 | 2 | Volodymyr Tkachenko | Soviet Union | 22.88 | |
| 7 | 7 | Frank Henter | West Germany | 23.03 | |
| 8 | 1 | Andrew Baildon | Australia | 23.15 | |
