= Liao Chin-ming =

Taiwanese weightlifter

Personal information
- Nationality: Taiwanese
- Born: 29 January 1966 (age 59)

Sport
- Sport: Weightlifting

Liao Chin-ming (born 29 January 1966) is a Taiwanese weightlifter. He competed in the men's heavyweight I event at the 1988 Summer Olympics.
