= Weightlifting at the 1988 Summer Olympics – Men's 100 kg =

Weightlifting at the Olympics

Men's 100 kg at the Games of the XXIV Olympiad
- Venue: Olympic Weightlifting Gymnasium
- Date: 26 September 1988
- Competitors: 21 from 17 nations
- Winning total: 425.0 kg OR

Medalists
1st place, gold medalist(s)		Pavel Kuznetsov	Soviet Union
2nd place, silver medalist(s)		Nicu Vlad	Romania
3rd place, bronze medalist(s)		Peter Immesberger	West Germany

The men's 100 kg weightlifting competitions at the 1988 Summer Olympics in Seoul took place on 26 September at the Olympic Weightlifting Gymnasium. It was the third appearance of the heavyweight I class.

== Results ==
Rank	Name	Country	kg
1	Pavel Kuznetsov	Soviet Union	425.0
2	Nicu Vlad	Romania	402.5
3	Peter Immesberger	West Germany	395.0
4	János Bökfi	Hungary	392.5
5	Francis Tournefier	France	385.0
6	Denis Garon	Canada	382.5
7	Hwang U-won	South Korea	382.5
8	Franz Langthaler	Austria	377.5
9	Fabio Magrini	Italy	370.0
10	Maik Nill	West Germany	370.0
11	Nobutaka Tomatsu	Japan	355.0
12	Andrew Saxton	Great Britain	352.5
13	Peter May	Great Britain	350.0
14	Théodore Nkwayed	Cameroon	320.0
15	Liao Chin-ming	Chinese Taipei	307.5
16	Mike Tererui	Cook Islands	242.5
AC	Tom Söderholm	Sweden	150.0
AC	Miloš Čiernik	Czechoslovakia	175.0
AC	Andor Szanyi	Hungary	407.5 (DQ)
AC	Kevin Blake	New Zealand	DNF
AC	Juraj Dudáš	Czechoslovakia	DNF
