= Wiegele =

Wiegele is a surname, a variant of Wiegel. Notable people with the surname include:

- Franz Wiegele (born 1965), Austrian ski jumper
- Martin Wiegele (born 1978), Austrian golfer
