= Kindsbach =

- Municipality
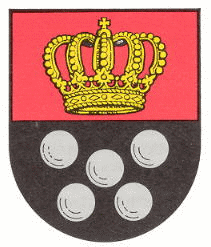
- Coat of arms

- Location of Kindsbach within Kaiserslautern district
- Interactive map of Kindsbach
- Location within Germany Location within Rhineland-Palatinate
- Coordinates: 49°25′06″N 7°37′58″E
- Country: Germany
- State: Rhineland-Palatinate
- District: Kaiserslautern

Government
  - Mayor (2019–24): Knut Böhlke (SPD)

Area
  - Total: 8.81 km^{2} (3.40 sq mi)
- Elevation: 247 m (810 ft)

Population (2025-12-31)
  - Total: 2,533
  - Density: 288/km^{2} (745/sq mi)
- Time zone: UTC+01:00 (CET)
  - Summer (DST): UTC+02:00 (CEST)
- Postal codes: 66862
- Dialling codes: 06371
- Vehicle registration: KL
- Website: www.kindsbach.de

Kindsbach (German pronunciation: [ˈkɪntsbax]) is a municipality in the district of Kaiserslautern, in Rhineland-Palatinate, western Germany.

== Notable people ==
- Paul Westrich (born 1947), insect specialist
- Peter Immesberger (born 1960), weight lifter
