= János Bökfi =

Hungarian weightlifter

Personal information
- Nationality: Hungarian
- Born: 2 June 1963 (age 61); Füzesgyarmat, Hungary

Sport
- Sport: Weightlifting

János Bökfi (born 2 June 1963) is a Hungarian weightlifter. He competed in the men's heavyweight I event at the 1988 Summer Olympics.
