= Juraj Dudáš =

Slovak weightlifter (born 1963)

Personal information
- Nationality: Slovak
- Born: 10 September 1963 (age 61); Komárno, Czechoslovakia

Sport
- Sport: Weightlifting

Juraj Dudáš (born 10 September 1963) is a Slovak weightlifter. He competed in the men's heavyweight I event at the 1988 Summer Olympics.
