= Frank Henter =

German swimmer

Personal information
- Born: January 30, 1964 (age 62)

Sport
- Sport: Swimming

Frank Henter (born 30 January 1964) is a former freestyle swimmer from West Germany.

Frank competed in the 50 metres freestyle at the 1988 Summer Olympics in Seoul, South Korea, finishing seventh in the Championship Final in a time of 23.03 seconds. His preliminary time was slightly quicker at 22.98 seconds.
