= Willi Meyer =

German diver

Personal information
- Nationality: German
- Born: 21 March 1965 (age 60); Heerlen, Netherlands

Sport
- Sport: Diving

Willi Meyer (born 21 March 1965) is a Dutch-born German diver. He competed in two events at the 1988 Summer Olympics.
