= Mark Gurr =

Zimbabwean tennis player (born 1966)

- Country (sports): Zimbabwe
- Born: February 18, 1966 (age 60) Zimbabwe

Mark Gurr (born February 18, 1966) is a retired tennis player from Zimbabwe, who competed at the 1988 Summer Olympics in Seoul, South Korea. There he lost in the first round of the men's singles competition to Spain's Sergio Casal. He lost in the second round of the men's doubles competition to Sweden's eventual bronze medalists Anders Järryd and Stefan Edberg, while partnering Philip Tuckniss.

Mark went to Oriel Boys High School in Harare together with Byron Black and Greig Rodgers, and played in the Davis Cup.
