= Maik Nill =

German weightlifter

Personal information
- Nationality: German
- Born: 6 August 1963 (age 61); Braunschweig, Germany

Sport
- Sport: Weightlifting

Maik Nill (born 6 August 1963) is a German weightlifter. He competed in the men's heavyweight I event at the 1988 Summer Olympics.
