= Christa Öckl =

German archer (born 1943)

Personal information
- Nationality: German
- Born: 30 September 1943 (age 81); Aussig, Reichsgau Sudetenland, Nazi Germany

Sport
- Sport: Archery

Christa Öckl (born 30 September 1943) is a German archer. She competed in the women's individual and team events at the 1988 Summer Olympics.
