= Hanns-Henning Fastrich =

German field hockey player

Olympic medal record

Men's Field Hockey

Representing West Germany
Silver medal – second place	1988 Seoul	Team competition

Hanns-Henning Fartrich (born 23 August 1963) is a former field hockey player from West Germany, who won the silver medal with the West German team at the 1988 Summer Olympics in Seoul.
