= Stephan Güsgen =

German swimmer

Personal information
- Nationality: West German
- Born: 26 March 1962 (age 64) Dormagen, North Rhine- Westphalia, West Germany
- Height: 2.03 m (6 ft 8 in)
- Weight: 93 kg (205 lb)

Sport
- Sport: Swimming
- Strokes: Freestyle
- Club: TSV Bayer Dormagen
- Coach: Jürgen Schmitz
Medal record
Representing West Germany
Summer Universiade
Bronze medal – third place	1987 Zagreb	50m freestyle

Stephan Güsgen (born 26 March 1962 in Dormagen, North Rhine-Westphalia) is a retired West German swimmer, who specialized in sprint freestyle events. He represented West Germany at the 1988 Summer Olympics, and also became a member of and a resident athlete for TSV Bayer Dormagen, under his personal coach Jürgen Schmitz.

Gusgen competed only in the inaugural 50 m freestyle at the 1988 Summer Olympics in Seoul, where he finished fourteenth in the B final with a time of 23.55.

Shortly after the Games, Gusgen officially retired from swimming, and later worked as a sport medicine orthopedic surgeon at a local hospital in Dormagen.
