= Katja Ziliox =

German swimmer (born 1970)

Personal information
- Born: 25 April 1970 (age 56) Siegen, West Germany
- Height: 1.75 m (5 ft 9 in)
- Weight: 65 kg (143 lb)

Sport
- Sport: Swimming
- Club: Schwimm Gemeinschaft DAB Hansa Dortmund
Medal record
Women's swimming
Representing West Germany
European Championships
| Bronze medal – third place | 1989 Bonn | 4×100 m freestyle |

Katja Ziliox (also Zillox; born 25 April 1970) is a retired German swimmer who won a bronze medal at the 1989 European Aquatics Championships. She also competed at the 1988 Summer Olympics in the 200 m backstroke, and 100 m and 4 × 100 m freestyle events and finished seventh in the relay.
