= Erik Hochstein =

German swimmer

Personal information
- Born: 1 October 1968 (age 57) Düsseldorf, West Germany
Medal record
Men's swimming
Representing West Germany
Olympic Games
Bronze medal – third place	1988 Seoul	4×200 m freestyle
European Championships (LC)
Silver medal – second place	1989 Bonn	4×200 m freestyle

Erik Hochstein (born 1 October 1968 in Düsseldorf, North Rhine-Westphalia) is a former swimmer from Germany, who won the bronze medal in the 4×200 m freestyle relay at the 1988 Summer Olympics.

== History ==
Hochstein started swimming competitively at age ten after watching his father and two older brothers swim. Between 1985 and 1990, he was a member of the West German National Team. Hochstein was fifteen years old.

Hochstein moved to the United States and swam for USC for three years. He coached for SCAQ 1994–1997, then took a break from swimming for more than four years. Hochstein is married and provides services for Senior citizens through a consulting business for families and through a non-profit organization called Sydney Cooper Senior Smiles.
