= Claudia Kriz =

German archer (born 1967)

Personal information
- Nationality: German
- Born: 18 January 1967 (age 58); Heppenheim, West Germany

Sport
- Sport: Archery

Claudia Kriz (born 18 January 1967) is a German archer. She competed in the women's individual and team events at the 1988 Summer Olympics.
