= Peter Immesberger =

German weightlifter

Personal information
- Born: 18 April 1960 (age 66) Kindsbach, West Germany
- Height: 1.76 m (5 ft 9 in)
- Weight: 100 kg (220 lb)

Sport
- Sport: Weightlifting
- Club: AC Kindsbach; AC Germania St. Ilgen
Medal record
Representing West Germany
Olympic Games
Bronze medal – third place	1988 Seoul	Heavyweight I (-100 kg); 175+220 kg

Peter Immesberger (born 18 April 1960) is a retired West German weightlifter who was active between 1983 and 1992. He competed at the 1984 and 1988 Summer Olympics and finished in fourth and third place, respectively.
