= Christian Schliemann =

German field hockey player

Olympic medal record

Men's field hockey

Representing West Germany
Silver medal – second place	1988 Seoul	Team competition

Christian Schliemann (born 4 July 1962) is a German former field hockey player who played for RTHC Bayer Leverkusen. He competed in the 1988 Summer Olympics, winning the silver medal.

== Biography ==
Schliemann was born in Leverkusen, North Rhine-Westphalia on 4 July 1962, and joined the ranks of the RTHC Bayer Leverkusen youth team. In 1981 he won the European Junior Championships, and in 1982 he won the Junior World Cup with the German team in Kuala Lumpur. In 1982 Schliemann made his debut in the senior team. In 1983 Schliemann belonged to the German squad at the European Championships in Amstelveen, where the German team won bronze. In 1984 the German team won the European Indoor Championship title. After taking bronze at the World Cup in 1986 in London and at the European Championships in Moscow in 1987, the German team with Schliemann won again in 1988 at the European Indoor Championships. At the 1988 Summer Olympics in Seoul, Schliemann was a replacement for Tobias Frank and with the team took the silver medal in the team competition. At the World Cup in 1990 in Lahore, Schliemann and national team finished in fourth place.

Between 1982 and 1991, Schliemann played in 112 international matches, including 34 indoors. Since his hockey career, Schliemann has worked as a purchasing agent for Bayer AG.

== Literature ==
- Nationales Olympisches Komitee für Deutschland: Die Olympiamannschaft der Bundesrepublik Deutschland. Seoul 1988. Frankfurt am Main 1988
