= Bettina Blumenberg =

German field hockey player

Personal information
- Born: 20 November 1962 (age 63) Braunschweig, West Germany
- Height: 1.68 m (5 ft 6 in)
- Weight: 58 kg (128 lb)

Sport
- Sport: Field hockey
Senior career
Years	Team	Caps	Goals
–	Eintracht Braunschweig	-	-
–	Klipper Hamburg	-	-
National team
Years	Team	Caps	Goals
1985–1989	West Germany	79	-
Medal record
Women's field hockey
Representing West Germany
Women's Hockey World Cup
Silver medal – second place	1986 Amstelveen	Team
Indoor Nations Championship
Gold medal – first place	1985 London	Team
Gold medal – first place	1987 Bad Neuenahr	Team

Bettina Heinicke née Blumenberg (born 20 November 1962, in Braunschweig, Germany) is a German former field hockey player who competed in the 1988 Summer Olympics. In total, she represented West Germany in 79 matches.
