= Tennis at the 1988 Summer Olympics =

- Date: 20 September–1 October 1988
- Edition: 10
- Surface: Hard (Neodex)
- Location: Seoul Olympic Park Tennis Center, Seoul

Champions

Men's singles
- Miloslav Mečíř (TCH)

Women's singles
- Steffi Graf (FRG)

Men's doubles
- Ken Flach / Robert Seguso (USA)

Women's doubles
- Pam Shriver / Zina Garrison (USA)
← 1984 ·	Summer Olympics	· 1992 →

Tennis returned to the Summer Olympic Games at the 1988 Summer Olympics in Seoul, having been left out since the 1924 Summer Olympics in Paris. Tennis had been a demonstration sport at the 1968 and 1984 Summer Olympics.

The tournament took place from September 20 – October 1 on outdoor hardcourts at the Seoul Olympic Park Tennis Center.

== Medal summary ==
=== Events ===
Event	Gold	Silver	Bronze
Men's singles	Miloslav Mečíř; Czechoslovakia	Tim Mayotte; United States	Stefan Edberg; Sweden
Men's singles	Miloslav Mečíř; Czechoslovakia	Tim Mayotte; United States	Brad Gilbert; United States
Men's doubles	United States; Ken Flach; Robert Seguso	Spain; Emilio Sánchez; Sergio Casal	Czechoslovakia; Miloslav Mečíř; Milan Šrejber
Men's doubles	United States; Ken Flach; Robert Seguso	Spain; Emilio Sánchez; Sergio Casal	Sweden; Stefan Edberg; Anders Järryd
Women's singles	Steffi Graf; West Germany	Gabriela Sabatini; Argentina	Zina Garrison; United States
Women's singles	Steffi Graf; West Germany	Gabriela Sabatini; Argentina	Manuela Maleeva-Fragnière; Bulgaria
Women's doubles	United States; Pam Shriver; Zina Garrison	Czechoslovakia; Jana Novotná; Helena Suková	Australia; Elizabeth Smylie; Wendy Turnbull
Women's doubles	United States; Pam Shriver; Zina Garrison	Czechoslovakia; Jana Novotná; Helena Suková	West Germany; Steffi Graf; Claudia Kohde-Kilsch

=== Medal table ===
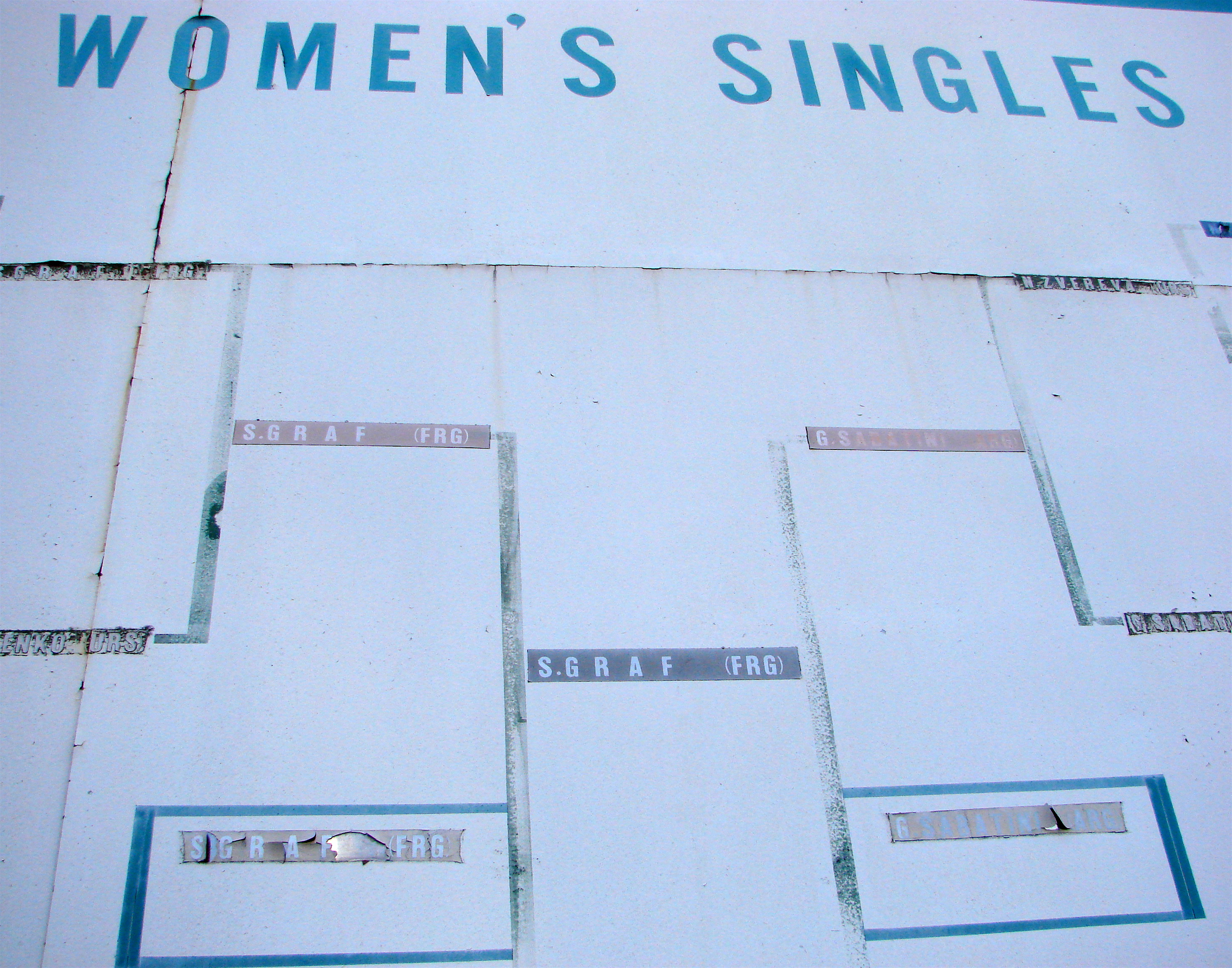
A scoreboard that still remained in 2006, that documents the women's singles draw

Rank	Nation	Gold	Silver	Bronze	Total
1	United States	2	1	2	5
2	Czechoslovakia	1	1	1	3
3	West Germany	1	0	1	2
4	Argentina	0	1	0	1
4	Spain	0	1	0	1
6	Sweden	0	0	2	2
7	Australia	0	0	1	1
7	Bulgaria	0	0	1	1
Totals (8 entries)		4	4	8	16
