= Victor Caballero =

Paraguayan tennis player

Victor Caballero (born August 26, 1960) is a former tennis player from Paraguay, who represented his native country at the 1988 Summer Olympics in Seoul. There he was defeated in the first round by qualifier Zeeshan Ali from India.

Caballero represented Paraguay at the Davis Cup on a single occasion, playing in a dead rubber against Jaroslav Navrátil after Paraguay defeated Czechoslovakia in the first round of 1983 World Group. Caballero was defeated by Navrátil 2–6 0–6.
