= Torsten Wiegel =

German swimmer

Personal information
- Born: 25 April 1967 (age 59) Dortmund, West Germany

Sport
- Sport: Swimming

Torsten Wiegel (born 25 April 1967) is a German swimmer. He competed in two events at the 1988 Summer Olympics representing West Germany.
