= Seoul Olympic Park Tennis Center =

Tennis venue in Seoul, South Korea

Coordinates: 37.515062°N 127.128918°E

Seoul Olympic Tennis Court (main venue)
- Interactive map of Seoul Olympic Tennis Court (main venue)
- Location: Seoul, South Korea
- Capacity: 10,000 (Seoul Olympic Tennis Court)
- Surface: Hard, Outdoors

Construction
- Groundbreaking: July 1985
- Opened: August 1986
- Cost: 5.6 billion won
- Architect: ?

Seoul Olympic Park Tennis Center (Korean: 올림픽 테니스장) is a tennis venue in Seoul, South Korea, located in the Olympic Park. It hosted the tennis events for the 1988 Summer Olympics and has hosted several South Korea Davis Cup team and South Korea Fed Cup team ties. The center currently hosts the Hansol Korea Open Tennis Championships. The main stadium has a capacity of 10,000 people. The No.1 court has a capacity of 3,500, and the other 12 courts have a capacity of 900.

== See also ==
- List of tennis stadiums by capacity
