= Spain at the 1988 Summer Olympics =

- IOC code: ESP
- NOC: Spanish Olympic Committee

in Seoul
- Competitors: 229 (200 men and 29 women) in 24 sports
- Flag bearer: Cristina de Borbón
- Medals Ranked 25th: Gold 1 Silver 1 Bronze 2 Total 4

Summer Olympics appearances (overview)
- 1900; 1904–1912; 1920; 1924; 1928; 1932; 1936; 1948; 1952; 1956; 1960; 1964; 1968; 1972; 1976; 1980; 1984; 1988; 1992; 1996; 2000; 2004; 2008; 2012; 2016; 2020; 2024; 2028

Spain competed at the 1988 Summer Olympics in Seoul, South Korea. 229 competitors, 200 men and 29 women, took part in 130 events in 24 sports. At the closing ceremony, a short Catalan segment was performed on a part of the Olympic Stadium, as the country hosted the next Olympics in Barcelona.

As of 2024, this is the most recent time that Spain did not win at least eleven medals or three gold medals.

== Medalists ==
Medal	Name	Sport	Event	Date
Gold	José Doreste	Sailing	Finn	27 September
Silver	Sergio Casal; Emilio Sánchez	Tennis	Men's doubles	1 October
Bronze	Sergio López	Swimming	Men's 200 m breaststroke	23 September
Bronze	Jorge Guardiola	Shooting	Skeet	24 September

Medals by sport
Sport	1st place, gold medalist(s)	2nd place, silver medalist(s)	3rd place, bronze medalist(s)	Total
Sailing	1	0	0	1
Tennis	0	1	0	1
Shooting	0	0	1	1
Swimming	0	0	1	1
Total	1	1	2	4

== Competitors ==
The following is the list of number of competitors in the Games.

Sport	Men	Women	Total
Archery	3	1	4
Athletics	27	7	34
Basketball	12	0	12
Boxing	5	–	5
Canoeing	13	0	13
Cycling	13	0	13
Diving	2	0	2
Equestrian	7	0	7
Fencing	8	0	8
Field hockey	16	0	16
Gymnastics	3	8	11
Handball	15	0	15
Judo	3	–	3
Modern pentathlon	3	–	3
Rowing	13	0	13
Sailing	14	3	17
Shooting	5	2	7
Swimming	7	4	11
Synchronized swimming	–	3	3
Tennis	3	1	4
Water polo	13	–	13
Weightlifting	6	–	6
Wrestling	9	–	9
Total	200	29	229

== Archery ==
No member of the Spanish archery delegation advanced past the preliminary round.

Women's Individual Competition:

- Teresa Valdés – Preliminary round, 57th place

Men's Individual Competition:

- Antonio Vazquez – Preliminary Round (→ 32nd place)
- Manuel Francisco Jiménez – Preliminary Round (→ 50th place)
- Juan Carlos Holgado – Preliminary Round (→ 52nd place)

Men's Team Competition:

- Vazquez, Jiménez, and Holgado – Preliminary Round (→ 17th place)

== Athletics ==
Men's 10.000 metres

- Antonio Prieto

- First Round — 28:22.52
- Final — 27:52.78 (→ 10th place)

- Antonio Serrano

- First Round — 29:01.13 (→ did not advance)

- José Manuel Albentosa

- First Round — did not finish (→ did not advance)

Men's Marathon

- Alfonso Abellán

- Final — 2:31:10 (→ 64th place)

- Honorato Hernández

- Final — DNF

Men's Long Jump

- Antonio Corgos

- Qualification — 7.88m
- Final — 8.03m (→ 5th place)

Men's Decathlon

- Antonio Peñalver — 7753 points (→ 23rd place)

1. 100 metres — 11.38s
2. Long Jump — 7.08m
3. Shot Put — 14.31m
4. High Jump — 2.00m
5. 400 metres — 50.24s
6. 110m Hurdles — 14.97s
7. Discus Throw — 46.34m
8. Pole Vault — 4.40m
9. Javelin Throw — 55.68m
10. 1.500 metres — 4:32.68s

Men's 20 km Walk

- José Marín

- Final — 1:20:34 (→ 4th place)

- Daniel Plaza

- Final — 1:21:53 (→ 12th place)

- Ricardo Pueyo

- Final — 1:23:40 (→ 23rd place)

Men's 50 km Walk

- José Marín

- Final — 3'43:03 (→ 5th place)

- Jorge Llopart

- Final — 3'48:09 (→ 13th place)

- Manuel Alcalde

- Final — 3'59:13 (→ 25th place)

Women's 4 × 400 m Relay

- Blanca Lacambra, Esther Lahoz, Cristina Pérez, Maite Zuñiga

- Heat — did not start (→ did not advance)

Women's 10.000 metres

- Ana Isabel Alonso

- Final — 32:40.50 (→ 25th place)

== Basketball ==
=== Men's tournament ===
Team roster

The following is the Spain roster in the men's basketball tournament of the 1988 Summer Olympics.

Spain men's national basketball team – 1988 Summer Olympics roster
Players
Coaches

Pos.	No.	Name	Age – Date of birth	Height	Club	Ctr.
G/F	4	Jordi Villacampa	24 – 11 October 1963	1.96 m (6 ft 5 in)	Club Joventut Badalona	(Spain)
	5	José Luis Llorente	29 – 6 January 1959	1.82 m (6 ft 0 in)	Real Madrid Baloncesto	(Spain)
SF	6	José Biriukov	25 – 3 February 1963	1.93 m (6 ft 4 in)	Real Madrid Baloncesto	(Spain)
SF	7	Josep Maria Margall	33 – 17 March 1955	1.98 m (6 ft 6 in)	Club Joventut Badalona	(Spain)
PF	8	Andrés Jiménez	26 – 6 June 1962	2.05 m (6 ft 9 in)	FC Barcelona Bàsquet	(Spain)
C	9	Enrique Andreu	20 – 20 October 1967	2.10 m (6 ft 11 in)	CEB Llíria	(Spain)
PG	10	José Antonio Montero	23 – 3 January 1965	1.93 m (6 ft 4 in)	Club Joventut Badalona	(Spain)
F	11	Fernando Arcega	28 – 3 September 1960	2.03 m (6 ft 8 in)	CB Zaragoza	(Spain)
PG	12	Ignacio Solozábal	30 – 8 January 1958	1.85 m (6 ft 1 in)	FC Barcelona Bàsquet	(Spain)
F/C	13	Ferran Martínez	20 – 25 April 1968	2.13 m (7 ft 0 in)	RCD Espanyol Bàsquet	(Spain)
C	14	Antonio Martín Espina	22 – 18 June 1966	2.10 m (6 ft 11 in)	Real Madrid Baloncesto	(Spain)
SF	15	Juan Antonio San Epifanio	29 – 12 June 1959	2.01 m (6 ft 7 in)	FC Barcelona Bàsquet	(Spain)

Head coach

Antonio Díaz-Miguel

Legend

- Club – describes last
  club before the tournament
- Age – describes age
  on 17 September 1988

Group play

Pos	Team	Pld	W	L	PF	PA	PD	Pts	Qualification
1	United States	5	5	0	485	302	+183	10	Quarterfinals
2	Spain	5	4	1	484	435	+49	9	Quarterfinals
3	Brazil	5	3	2	590	522	+68	8	Quarterfinals
4	Canada	5	2	3	479	455	+24	7	Quarterfinals
5	China	5	1	4	433	527	−94	6	9th–12th classification round
6	Egypt	5	0	5	338	568	−230	5	9th–12th classification round

Source: FIBA archive
Rules for classification: 1) points; 2) head-to-head points; 3) head-to-head goal average; 4) head-to-head number of points scored.

18 September 1988

Spain	53–97	United States
Scoring by half: 32–48, 21–49

Jamsil Gymnasium, Seoul

20 September 1988

Egypt	70–113	Spain
Scoring by half: 44–57, 26–56

Jamsil Gymnasium, Seoul

21 September 1988

China	74–106	Spain
Scoring by half: 43–59, 31–57

Jamsil Gymnasium, Seoul

23 September 1988

Canada	84–94	Spain
Scoring by half: 51–45, 33–49

Jamsil Gymnasium, Seoul

24 September 1988

Brazil	110–118	Spain
Scoring by half: 57–61, 53–57

Jamsil Gymnasium, Seoul

Quarterfinals

26 September 1988
16:30

Boxscore

Spain	74–77	Australia
Scoring by half: 40–41, 34–36
Pts: San Epifanio 17; Rebs: Martínez, Jiménez 7 Asts: Montero 3		Pts: Gaze 28; Rebs: Sengstock 5 Asts: 4 players 1

Jamsil Gymnasium, Seoul

Classification round 5–8

28 September 1988
14:30

Boxscore

Canada	96–91	Spain
Scoring by half: 41–42, 55–49
Pts: Triano 27; Rebs: Raffin 8 Asts: Raffin 4		Pts: Jiménez 16; Rebs: Jiménez 6 Asts: Solozábal 5

Jamsil Gymnasium, Seoul

Classification round 7/8

29 September 1988
19:30

Boxscore

Puerto Rico	93–92	Spain
Scoring by half: 47–45, 46–47
Pts: Morales 25; Rebs: Ortíz, Mincy 8 Asts: Ortíz 4		Pts: Jiménez 31; Rebs: Jiménez 8 Asts: Solozábal 6

Jamsil Gymnasium, Seoul

== Boxing ==
Men's Light Flyweight (– 48 kg)

- Antonio Caballero

- First Round — Bye
- Second Round — Lost to Dang Nieu Hu (VIE), RSC-2

Men's Flyweight (– 51 kg)

- Bonifacio García

- First Round — Lost to Nokuthula Tshabangu (ZIM), 1:4

Light Welterweight (– 63.5 kg)

- Tomás Ruiz

- First Round — Lost to Mark Elliot (GBR), 1:4

Men's Welterweight (– 67 kg)

- Javier Martínez

- First Round — Bye
- Second Round — Win to Lucas Januario (MOZ), 5:0
- Third Round — Lost to Adewale Adgebusi (NGA), 0:5

Heavyweight (– 91 kg)

- José Ortega

- First Round — Lost to Gyula Alvics (HUN), 0:5

== Canoeing ==
Men's C-1 500 metres

- Narcisco Suárez

- Heat – 1st (heat-2)
- Semifinal – 1:55.98
- Final – 2:01.33 (→ 7th place)

Men's C-1 1000 metres

- Francisco López

- Heat – 4:16.02
- Repechage; 4:22.34
- Semifinal – 4:16.90 (→ did not advance)

Men's C-2 500 metres

- Enrique Míguez and Narcisco Suárez

- Heat – 1:48.75
- Semifinal – 1:50.63 (→ did not advance)

Men's K-1 500 metres

- Francisco Leal

- Heat – 1:47.71
- Semifinal – 1:46.93 (→ did not advance)

Men's K-1 1000 metres

- José Reyes Rodríguez

- Heat – 3:59.95
- Repechage – 3:53.39
- Semifinal – 3:48.35 (→ did not advance)

Men's K-2 500 metres

- Fernando Fuentes and Juan Manuel Sánchez

- Heat – 1:36.17
- Repechage – 1:40.09
- Semifinal – 1:36.22 (→ did not advance)

Men's K-2 1000 metres

- Alberto Sánchez (canoeist) and Gregorio Vicente

- Heat – 3:32.97
- Repechage – 3:32.92 (→ did not advance)

Men's K-4 1000 metres

- Juan Manuel Sánchez, Fernando Fuentes, Francisco Javier Álvarez, and Juan José Román

- Heat – 3:06.96
- Repechage – 3:16.79
- Semifinal – 3:13.88 (→ did not advance)

== Cycling ==
Thirteen cyclists, all male, represented Spain in 1988.

Men's road race

- Eduardo Manrique
- Gonzalo Aguiar
- Iván Alemany

Men's team time trial

- Javier Aldanondo
- Javier Carbayeda
- Arturo Gériz
- José Rodríguez

Men's sprint

- José Moreno

Men's 1 km time trial

- Bernardo González

Men's individual pursuit

- José Antonio Martiarena

Men's team pursuit

- Bernardo González
- Xavier Isasa
- José Antonio Martiarena
- Agustín Sebastiá

Men's points race

- Antonio Salvador

== Diving ==
Men

Athlete	Event	Preliminary		Final	
Athlete	Event	Points	Rank	Points	Rank
José Miguel Gil	3 m springboard	483.12	25	Did not advance	
Emilio Ratia	10 m platform	425.73	25	Did not advance	

== Equestrianism ==
Equestrians

- Luis Antonio Álvarez
- Luis Astolfi
- José Ramón Beca
- Alfredo Fernández-Duran
- Juan Diego García
- Juan Félix Matute
- Santiago de la Rocha
- Pedro Sánchez

== Fencing ==
Eight fencers, all men, represented Spain in 1988.

Men's foil

- Andrés García
- Jesús Esperanza

Men's épée

- Ángel Fernández
- Fernando de la Peña
- Manuel Pereira

Men's team épée

- Ángel Fernández, Oscar Fernández, Raúl Maroto, Fernando de la Peña, Manuel Pereira

Men's sabre

- Antonio García

== Gymnastics ==
Men's events

- Alvaro Montesinos
- Alfonso Rodríguez de Sadia
- Miguel Ángel Rubio

Women's events

- Núria Belchi
- Lidia Castillejo
- Nuria García
- Manuela Hervás
- Laura Muñoz
- Eva María Rueda

== Handball ==
- Team roster

- Juan Javier Cabanas
- Jesús Ángel Fernández
- Jaume Fort
- Jesús Gómez
- Ricardo Marín
- Juan Francisco Muñoz
- Juan Alfonso de la Puente
- Jaime Puig
- Javier Reino
- Lorenzo Rico
- Julián Ruiz
- Juan Sagalés
- Eugenio Serrano
- Juan José Uría
- Miguel Ángel Zúñiga

- Head coach: Juan de Dios Román

== Hockey ==
Men's team competition

- Preliminary round (group A)

- Spain – Pakistan 1-5
- Spain – Netherlands 1-1
- Spain – Kenya 4-2
- Spain – Argentina 0-1
- Spain – Australia 0-1

- Classification Matches

- 9th/12th place: Spain – Canada 2-0
- 9th/10th place: Spain – South Korea 2-0 (→ 9th place)

- Team roster

- Jaime Armengol
- Ignacio Escudé
- Jaime Escudé
- Javier Escudé
- Eduardo Fàbregas
- Juan de Dios García-Mauriño
- Andreu Gómez
- Santiago Grau
- José Antonio Iglesias
- Joaquín Malgosa
- Juan Malgosa
- Jordi Oliva
- Miguel de Paz
- Miguel Ortego
- Juan Carlos Peón
- Miguel Rovira

== Modern pentathlon ==
Three male pentathletes represented Spain in 1988.

Men's Individual Competition:

- Eduardo Quesada – 4852 pts (→ 32nd place)
- Leopoldo Centeno – 4814pts (→ 38th place)
- Jorge Quesada – 0pt (→ 64th place)

Men's Team Competition:

- Quesada, Centeno, and Quesada – 9666pts (→ 19th place)

== Rhythmic gymnastics ==
- María Isabel Lloret (→ 5th)
- María Martín Rodríguez (→ 20th)

== Sailing ==
Men

Athlete	Event	Race							Net points	Final rank
Athlete	Event	1	2	3	4	5	6	7	Net points	Final rank
Carlos Iniesta	Division II	5	21	~~27~~	1	2	24	6	81.7	8
José Luis Doreste	Finn	7	3	1	~~DSQ~~	3	4	3	38.1	1st place, gold medalist(s)
Fernando León Boissier; Kiko Sánchez	470	4	11	4	4	~~PMS~~	1	8	55.0	4

Women

Athlete	Event	Race							Net points	Final rank
Athlete	Event	1	2	3	4	5	6	7	Net points	Final rank
Adelina Gonzalez; Patricia Guerra	470	8	6	4	10	~~RET~~	DSQ	13	90.7	10

Open

Athlete	Event	Race							Net points	Final rank
Athlete	Event	1	2	3	4	5	6	7	Net points	Final rank
Luis Doreste; Miguel Noguer	Flying Dutchman	11	16	13	7	11	~~17~~	4	96.0	13
Francisco García; Luis López; Cristina De Borbón	Tornado	19	20	19	18	~~RET~~	18	RET	154.0	20
Juan Costas; José Pérez	Star	11	12	~~RET~~	14	19	9	PMS	123.0	17
Antonio Gorostegui; Jaime Monjo; José Manuel Valades; Domingo Manrique	Soling	16	16	18	12	13	17	~~RET~~	128.0	17

== Shooting ==
Men

Athlete	Event	Qualification		Final	
Athlete	Event	Points	Rank	Points	Rank
Jorge González	50 m rifle three positions	1168	15	Did not advance	
Jorge González	50 m rifle prone	593	32	Did not advance	
Jorge González	10 m air rifle	579	40	Did not advance	
Juan Segui	25 m rapid fire pistol	588	18	Did not advance	

Women

Athlete	Event	Qualification		Final	
Athlete	Event	Points	Rank	Points	Rank
Eva Suarez	10 m air pistol	379	10	Did not advance	
Eva Suarez	25 m pistol	569	32	Did not advance	

Open

Athlete	Event	Qualification		Semifinal		Final	
Athlete	Event	Points	Rank	Points	Rank	Points	Rank
Rafael Axpe	Trap	145	13 Q	193	11	Did not advance	
José Bladas	Trap	144	18 Q	190	18	Did not advance	
Jorge Guardiola	Skeet	147	8 Q	196	6 Q	220	3rd place, bronze medalist(s)
Eladio Vallduvi	Trap	145	11 Q	192	12	Did not advance	
Gemma Usieto	Trap	140	33	Did not advance			

== Swimming ==
Men's 200m Freestyle

- Daniel Serra

- Heat – 1:53.05 (→ did not advance, 28th place)

Men's 400m Freestyle

- Daniel Serra

- Heat – 3:57.46 (→ did not advance, 22nd place)

Men's 100m Backstroke

- Martin López-Zubero

- Heat – 58.06 (→ did not advance, 23rd place)

Men's 200m Backstroke

- Martin López-Zubero

- Heat – 2:03.33
- B-Final – 2:03.70 (→ 11th place)

Men's 100m Breaststroke

- Joaquín Fernández

- Heat – 1:05.19 (→ did not advance, 32nd place)

- Sergi López

- Heat – 1:06.08 (→ did not advance, 43rd place)

Men's 200m Breaststroke

- Sergi López

- Heat – 2:17.06
- Final – 2:15.21 (→ Bronze Medal)

- Joaquín Fernández

- Heat – 2:20.34 (→ did not advance, 24th place)

Men's 100m Butterfly

- José Luis Ballester

- Heat – 55.27 (→ did not advance, 18th place)

Men's 200m Butterfly

- José Luis Ballester

- Heat – 2:03.32 (→ did not advance, 24th place)

Men's 200m Individual Medley

- Martin López-Zubero

- Heat – 2:10.52 (→ did not advance, 31st place)

- Sergi López

- Heat – 2:13.48 (→ did not advance, 36th place)

Men's 200m Individual Medley

- Martin López-Zubero

- Heat – 4:35.68 (→ did not advance, 27th place)

Men's 4 × 100 m Medley Relay

- Martin López-Zubero, Ramón Camallonga, José Luis Ballester, and José Hernando

- Heat – 3:49.47 (→ did not advance, 12th place)

Women's 200m Breaststroke

- Silvia Parera

- Heat – 2:35.57 (→ did not advance, 18th place)

Women's 100m Butterfly

- María Luisa Fernández

- Heat – 1:02.47 (→ did not advance, 17th place)

Women's 200m Individual Medley

- Silvia Parera

- Heat – 2:22.20 (→ did not advance, 21st place)

Women's 4 × 100 m Medley Relay

- Natalia Autric, Silvia Parera, María Luisa Fernández, and Amaia Garbayo

- Heat – 4:21.84 (→ did not advance, 13th place)

== Synchronized swimming ==
Three synchronized swimmers represented Spain in 1988.

Women's solo

- Eva López
- Marta Amorós
- Núria Ayala

Women's duet

- Eva López
- Núria Ayala

== Tennis ==
Men's Singles Competition

- Javier Sánchez

- First round — Defeated Sadiq Abdullahi (Nigeria) 6-2 7-5 6-3
- Second round — Defeated Grant Connell (Canada) 6-4 6-4 6-2
- Third round — Lost to Paolo Canè (Italy) 6-7 6-4 1-6 2-6

- Emilio Sánchez

- First round — Defeated Shuzo Matsuoka (Japan) 6-3 6-4 6-3
- Second round — Lost to Paolo Canè (Italy) 5-7 3-6 7-6 4-6

- Sergio Casal

- First round — Defeated Mark Gurr (Zimbabwe) 6-2 6-3 6-1
- Second round — Defeated Leonardo Lavalle (Mexico) 6-3 6-4 7-6
- Third round — Lost to Michiel Schapers (Netherlands) 4-6 6-4 6-2 3-6 4-6

Men's Doubles Competition

- Emilio Sánchez and Sergio Casal → Silver Medal

- First Round – Defeated Andrei Olhovskiy and Alexander Volkov (Soviet Union) 6-3 6-3 6-1
- Second Round – Defeated Alex Antonitsch and Horst Skoff (Austria) 6-4 6-2 6-1
- Quarterfinals – Defeated Goran Ivanišević and Slobodan Živojinović (Yugoslavia) 6-1 7-6 6-3
- Semifinals – Defeated Stefan Edberg and Anders Järryd (Sweden) 6-4 1-6 6-3 6-2
- Final – Lost to Ken Flach and Robert Seguso (USA) 3-6 4-6 7-6 7-6 7-9

== Water polo ==
=== Men's tournament ===
- Preliminary round (Group B)

- Defeated China (13-6)
- Defeated United States (9-7)
- Drew with Hungary (6-6)
- Lost to Yugoslavia (8-10)
- Defeated Greece (12-9)

- Classification round (Group D)

- Lost to Australia (7-8)
- Defeated Italy (11-9) → 6th place

- Team roster

- Jesús Rollán
- Miguel Chillida
- Marco Antonio González
- Miguel Pérez
- Manuel Estiarte
- Pere Robert
- Jorge Payá
- José Antonio Rodriguez
- Jordi Sans
- Salvador Gómez
- Mariano Moya
- Jorge Neira
- Pedro Francisco García

- Head coach: Antonio Esteller
