= Cycling at the 1988 Summer Olympics – Men's team pursuit =

The men's team pursuit was a cycling event at the 1988 Summer Olympics in Seoul, South Korea which was held on 23 and 24 September 1988. There were a total number of 19 participating teams.

== Qualification ==
4000 metre time trial, with the top 8 teams advancing.

| Rank | Team | Riders | Time |
|---|---|---|---|
| 1 | Soviet Union | Viatcheslav Ekimov, Artūras Kasputis, Dmitry Nelyubin, Gintautas Umaras, Mindaugas Umaras | 4:16.10 WR |
| 2 | Australia | Brett Dutton, Wayne McCarney, Stephen McGlede, Dean Woods, Scott McGrory | 4:16.32 |
| 3 | France | Hervé Dagorné, Pascal Lino, Didier Pasgrimaud, Pascal Potié | 4:17.19 |
| 4 | East Germany | Steffen Blochwitz, Roland Hennig, Carsten Wolf, Dirk Meier, Uwe Preißler | 4:17.61 |
| 5 | Czechoslovakia | Svatopluk Buchta, Zbyněk Fiala, Pavel Soukup, Aleš Trčka, Pavel Tesař | 4:20.55 |
| 6 | Poland | Ryszard Dawidowicz, Joachim Halupczok, Andrzej Sikorski, Marian Turowski | 4:21.30 |
| 7 | Denmark | Peter Clausen, Dan Frost, Jimmi Madsen, Lars Olsen, Ken Frost | 4:22.37 |
| 8 | Italy | Ivan Beltrami, Gianpaolo Grisandi, David Solari, Fabrizio Trezzi, Fabio Baldato | 4:22.64 |
| 9 | United States | Dave Lettieri, Michael McCarthy, Leonard Nitz, Carl Sundquist | 4:22.96 |
| 10 | West Germany | Thomas Dürst, Matthias Lange, Uwe Nepp, Michael Rich | 4:23.10 |
| 11 | Spain | Bernardo González, Xavier Isasa, José Antonio Martiarena, Agustín Sebastiá | 4:24.90 |
| 12 | Netherlands | Marcel Beumer, Erik Cent, Leo Peelen, Mario van Baarle | 4:25.67 |
| 13 | Great Britain | Chris Boardman, Robert Coull, Simon Lillistone, Glen Sword | 4:25.87 |
| 14 | New Zealand | Craig Connell, Nigel Donnelly, Andrew Whitford, Stuart Williams | 4:26.13 |
| 15 | Japan | Koichi Azuma, Fumiharu Miyamoto, Kazuaki Sasaki, Kazuo Takikawa | 4:28.50 |
| 16 | Austria | Roland Königshofer, Johann Lienhart, Kurt Schmied, Franz Stocher | 4:28.64 |
| 17 | Argentina | Gabriel Curuchet, Jorge Gaday, Sergio Llamazares, Rubén Priede | 4:29.90 |
| 18 | South Korea | An U-hyeok, Jeong Jeom-sik, Kim Yong-gyu, Park Min-su | 4:34.55 |
| 19 | Brazil | Clóvis Anderson, Paulo Jamur, Fernando Louro, Antônio Silvestre | 4:38.21 |

== Match round ==
In the match round, the top 8 teams from the qualification round were matched together, 1 vs. 8, 2 vs. 7, 3 vs. 6 and 4 vs. 5 for the Quarterfinal. In the Quarterfinal, the winner of each match advanced to race in the Semifinals.

=== Quarterfinal ===
Match 1

| Name | Time | |
|---|---|---|
| East Germany | 4:14.45 | O |
| Czechoslovakia | 4:19.05 | X |

Match 2

| Name | Time | |
|---|---|---|
| France | 4:17.70 | O |
| Poland | 4:22.50 | X |

Match 3

| Name | Time | |
|---|---|---|
| Australia | 4:17.14 | O |
| Denmark | 4:25.30 | X |

Match 4

| Name | Time | |
|---|---|---|
| Soviet Union | 4:14.22 | O |
| Italy | 4:20.90 | X |

=== Semifinal ===
Match 1

| Name | Time | |
|---|---|---|
| East Germany | 4:20.65 | O |
| Australia | 4:21.83 | X |

Match 2

| Name | Time | |
|---|---|---|
| Soviet Union | 4:20.17 | O |
| France | 4:29.49 | X |

=== Finals ===
Bronze Medal Match

| Name | Time | |
|---|---|---|
| Australia | 4:16.02 | O |
| France | 4:22.23 | X |

Gold Medal Match

| Name | Time | |
|---|---|---|
| Soviet Union | 4:13.31 | O |
| East Germany | 4:14.09 | X |
