= Cycling at the 1988 Summer Olympics – Men's points race =

Olympic cycling event

Men's points race at the Games of the XXIV Olympiad
- Track cycling pictogram
- Venue: Olympic Velodrome
- Dates: 21–24 September
- Competitors: 34 from 34 nations
- Winning score: 38 (0 laps behind)

Medalists
1st place, gold medalist(s)		Dan Frost; Denmark
2nd place, silver medalist(s)		Leo Peelen; Netherlands
3rd place, bronze medalist(s)		Marat Ganeyev; Soviet Union

The men's points race was an event at the 1988 Summer Olympics in Seoul, South Korea, for which the final was held on 24 September 1988. There were 34 participants from 34 nations, with 24 cyclists competing in the final. Each nation was limited to 1 cyclist in the event. The event was won by Dan Frost of Denmark, with Leo Peelen of the Netherlands taking silver and Marat Ganeyev of the Soviet Union bronze. It was the first medal in the men's points race for each of the three nations.

== Background ==
This was the third appearance of the event. It was first held in 1900 and not again until 1984; after that, it was held every Summer Games until 2008 when it was removed from the programme. The women's version was held from 1996 through 2008.

Three of the 24 finalists from the 1984 Games returned: silver medalist Uwe Messerschmidt of West Germany, bronze medalist José Youshimatz of Mexico, and fifth-place finisher Juan Curuchet of Argentina. The reigning World Champion (1987) was Marat Ganeyev of the Soviet Union; Messerschmidt had been runner-up. Dan Frost of Denmark had won the World Championship in 1986. Ganeyev and Frost were favored in Seoul.

Barbados, Bolivia, Chinese Taipei, Czechoslovakia, East Germany, Hungary, Iran, Liechtenstein, Malaysia, Poland, South Korea, the Soviet Union, Spain, Trinidad and Tobago, and Venezuela each made their debut in the event. France and Italy both competed for the third time, the only nations to have competed in all three Olympic men's points races.

== Competition format ==
The contest consisted of two rounds: semifinals and a final. The distance varied by round, with 30 kilometres in the semifinals and 50 kilometres in the final. The top 12 in each of the two semifinals advanced to the 24-man final. Placement in each race was determined first by how many laps behind the leader the cyclist was and second by how many sprint points the cyclist accumulated. That is, a cyclist with more sprint points but who was lapped once would be ranked behind a cyclist with fewer points but who had not been lapped. Sprint points could be gained only by cyclists who had not been lapped.

In the semifinals, there were 20 sprints—one every 1.5 kilometres. Points were awarded based on the position of the cyclists at the end of the sprint. Most of the sprints were worth five points for the leader, three to the second-place cyclist, two to third, and one to fourth. The 10th (halfway) and 20th (final) sprint were worth double: ten points, six, four, and two.

The final featured 30 sprints—one every 1.67 kilometres. As in the semifinals, most sprints were worth 5/3/2/1 points, with the halfway (15th) and final (30th) sprints worth 10/6/4/2.

== Schedule ==
All times are Korea Standard Time adjusted for daylight savings (UTC+10)

Date	Time	Round
Wednesday, 21 September 1988	14:30	Semifinal 1
Thursday, 22 September 1988	10:50	Semifinal 2
Saturday, 24 September 1988	19:30	Final

== Results ==
=== Semifinals ===
==== Semifinal 1 ====
Rank	Cyclist	Nation	Laps behind	Points	Notes
1	Do Eun-cheol	South Korea	0	29	Q
2	Dan Frost	Denmark	0	27	Q
3	Alexis Méndez	Venezuela	0	21	Q
4	Miklós Somogyi	Hungary	0	12	Q
5	Roland Königshofer	Austria	0	5	Q
6	Robert Burns	Australia	1	24	Q
7	Olaf Ludwig	East Germany	1	21	Q
8	Marat Ganeyev	Soviet Union	1	17	Q
9	Antonio Salvador	Spain	1	15	Q
10	Wojciech Pawłak	Poland	1	11	Q
11	Frankie Andreu	United States	1	11	Q
12	Fernando Louro	Brazil	1	10	Q
13	Peter Hermann	Liechtenstein	1	9	
14	Yoshihiro Tsumuraya	Japan	1	7	
14	Michele Smith	Cayman Islands	1	1	
—	Roderick Chase	Barbados	DNF	—	
—	Bernardo Rimarim	Philippines	DNF	—	

==== Semifinal 2 ====
Rank	Cyclist	Nation	Laps behind	Points	Notes
1	José Youshimatz	Mexico	0	32	Q
2	Luboš Lom	Czechoslovakia	0	20	Q
3	Gene Samuel	Trinidad and Tobago	0	16	Q
4	Leo Peelen	Netherlands	0	13	Q
5	Juan Curuchet	Argentina	0	11	Q
6	Pascal Lino	France	1	28	Q
7	Uwe Messerschmidt	West Germany	1	22	Q
8	Philippe Grivel	Switzerland	1	19	Q
9	Peter Aldridge	Jamaica	1	15	Q
10	Hsu Jui-te	Chinese Taipei	1	14	Q
11	Giovanni Lombardi	Italy	1	13	Q
12	Gianni Vignaduzzi	Canada	1	3	Q
13	Murugayan Kumaresan	Malaysia	1	1	
14	Jalil Eftekhari	Iran	2	13	
—	Bailón Becerra	Bolivia	DNF	—	
—	Neil Lloyd	Antigua and Barbuda	DNF	—	
—	Federico Moreira	Uruguay	DNF	—	

=== Final ===
Ganeyev led the scoreboard for most of the race, but near the end was lapped by Frost and Peelen. He took bronze despite having the most points. Frost had scored more between the lead pair, so took gold.

Rank	Cyclist	Nation	Laps behind	Points
1st place, gold medalist(s)	Dan Frost	Denmark	0	38
2nd place, silver medalist(s)	Leo Peelen	Netherlands	0	26
3rd place, bronze medalist(s)	Marat Ganeyev	Soviet Union	1	46
4	Robert Burns	Australia	1	20
5	Juan Curuchet	Argentina	1	18
6	Uwe Messerschmidt	West Germany	2	28
7	Pascal Lino	France	2	21
8	Frankie Andreu	United States	2	21
9	José Youshimatz	Mexico	2	21
10	Miklós Somogyi	Hungary	2	13
11	Giovanni Lombardi	Italy	2	13
12	Roland Königshofer	Austria	2	11
13	Alexis Méndez	Venezuela	2	8
14	Olaf Ludwig	East Germany	3	19
15	Gene Samuel	Trinidad and Tobago	3	10
16	Wojciech Pawłak	Poland	3	8
17	Gianni Vignaduzzi	Canada	3	7
18	Antonio Salvador	Spain	3	5
19	Do Eun-cheol	South Korea	3	4
20	Philippe Grivel	Switzerland	3	4
21	Hsu Jui-te	Chinese Taipei	3	4
22	Peter Aldridge	Jamaica	3	4
23	Luboš Lom	Czechoslovakia	3	3
24	Fernando Louro	Brazil	3	0

== Results summary ==
Rank	Cyclist	Nation	Semifinals		Final	
Rank	Cyclist	Nation	Laps behind	Points	Laps behind	Points
1st place, gold medalist(s)	Dan Frost	Denmark	0	27	0	38
2nd place, silver medalist(s)	Leo Peelen	Netherlands	0	13	0	26
3rd place, bronze medalist(s)	Marat Ganeyev	Soviet Union	1	17	1	46
4	Robert Burns	Australia	1	24	1	20
5	Juan Curuchet	Argentina	0	11	1	18
6	Uwe Messerschmidt	West Germany	1	22	2	28
7	Pascal Lino	France	1	28	2	21
8	Frankie Andreu	United States	1	11	2	21
9	José Youshimatz	Mexico	0	32	2	21
10	Miklós Somogyi	Hungary	0	12	2	13
11	Giovanni Lombardi	Italy	1	13	2	13
12	Roland Königshofer	Austria	0	5	2	11
13	Alexis Méndez	Venezuela	0	21	2	8
14	Olaf Ludwig	East Germany	1	21	3	19
15	Gene Samuel	Trinidad and Tobago	0	16	3	10
16	Wojciech Pawłak	Poland	1	11	3	8
17	Gianni Vignaduzzi	Canada	1	3	3	7
18	Antonio Salvador	Spain	1	15	3	5
19	Do Eun-cheol	South Korea	0	29	3	4
20	Philippe Grivel	Switzerland	1	19	3	4
21	Hsu Jui-te	Chinese Taipei	1	14	3	4
22	Peter Aldridge	Jamaica	1	15	3	4
23	Luboš Lom	Czechoslovakia	0	20	3	3
24	Fernando Louro	Brazil	1	10	3	0
25	Peter Hermann	Liechtenstein	1	9	Did not advance	
26	Yoshihiro Tsumuraya	Japan	1	7	Did not advance	
27	Murugayan Kumaresan	Malaysia	1	1	Did not advance	
28	Michele Smith	Cayman Islands	1	1	Did not advance	
29	Jalil Eftekhari	Iran	2	13	Did not advance	
—	Bailón Becerra	Bolivia	DNF	—	Did not advance	
—	Roderick Chase	Barbados	DNF	—	Did not advance	
—	Neil Lloyd	Antigua and Barbuda	DNF	—	Did not advance	
—	Federico Moreira	Uruguay	DNF	—	Did not advance	
—	Bernardo Rimarim	Philippines	DNF	—	Did not advance	
—	Mario Pons	Ecuador	DNS	—	Did not advance	
