= Barbados at the 1988 Summer Olympics =

- IOC code: BAR
- NOC: Barbados Olympic Association

in Seoul
- Competitors: 17 (16 men and 1 woman) in 7 sports
- Flag bearer: Elvis Forde
- Medals: Gold 0 Silver 0 Bronze 0 Total 0

Summer Olympics appearances (overview)
- 1968; 1972; 1976; 1980; 1984; 1988; 1992; 1996; 2000; 2004; 2008; 2012; 2016; 2020; 2024

Other related appearances
- British West Indies (1960 S)

Barbados was represented at the 1988 Summer Olympics in Seoul, South Korea by the Barbados Olympic Association.

In total, 17 athletes including 16 men and one woman represented Barbados in seven different sports including athletics, boxing, cycling, diving, judo, sailing and swimming.

== Competitors ==
In total, 17 athletes represented Barbados at the 1988 Summer Olympics in Seoul, South Korea across seven different sports.

Sport	Men	Women	Total
Athletics	5	1	6
Boxing	2	–	2
Cycling	2	0	2
Diving	1	0	1
Judo	1	–	1
Sailing	4	0	4
Swimming	1	0	1
Total	16	1	17

== Athletics ==
In total, six Barbadian athletes participated in the athletics events – Henrico Atkins, Elvis Forde, Allan Ince, Richard Louis, Seibert Straughn and Yolande Straughn.

Athlete	Event	Heat Round 1		Heat Round 2		Semifinal		Final	
Athlete	Event	Time	Rank	Time	Rank	Time	Rank	Time	Rank
Henrico Atkins	Men's 100 metres	11.01	85	Did not advance					
Henrico Atkins	Men's 200 metres	21.98	54	Did not advance					
Elvis Forde	Men's 400 metres	46.47	22 Q	46.59	31	Did not advance			
Richard Louis	Men's 400 metres	46.80	36	Did not advance					
Seibert Straughn	Men's 400 metres	47.37	44	Did not advance					
Allan Ince	Men's 400 metres hurdles	52.76	32	—		Did not advance			
Seibert Straughn; Richard Louis; Allan Ince; Elvis Forde	Men's 4 × 400 metres relay	3:06.03	9 q	—		3:06.93	11	Did not advance	
Yolande Straughn	Women's 200 metres	23.81	33	Did not advance					
Yolande Straughn	Women's 400 metres	53.62	30 q	54.22	31	Did not advance			

== Boxing ==
In total, two Barbadian athletes participated in the boxing events – Gregory Griffith in the welterweight category and Sean Knight in the lightweight category.

Athlete	Event	Round of 64	Round of 32	Round of 16	Quarterfinals	Semifinals	Final	
Athlete	Event	Opposition Result	Opposition Result	Opposition Result	Opposition Result	Opposition Result	Opposition Result	Rank
Sean Knight	Lightweight	Tamez (MEX); W 5–0	Tszyu (URS); L RSC R1	Did not advance				
Gregory Griffith	Welterweight	Bye	Furnigov (BUL); L KO	Did not advance				

== Cycling ==
In total, two Barbadian athletes participated in the cycling events – Roderick Chase in the men's men's 1 km time trial and the men's points race and Vincent Lynch in the men's sprint.

Athlete	Event	Qualification		Round 1	Repechage 1	Round 2	Repechage 2	Quarterfinals	Semifinals	Final	
Athlete	Event	Time Speed (km/h)	Rank	Opposition Time Speed (km/h)	Opposition Time Speed (km/h)	Opposition Time Speed (km/h)	Opposition Time Speed (km/h)	Opposition Time Speed (km/h)	Opposition Time Speed (km/h)	Opposition Time Speed (km/h)	Rank
Vincent Lynch	Sprint	11.845	22 Q	Colas (FRA), Miwa (JPN); L	Harnett (CAN), Carpenter (USA), Alwi (MAS); L	Did not advance					

Athlete	Event	Time	Rank
Roderick Chase	Time trial	1:09.994	24

Athlete	Event	Qualification			Final		
Athlete	Event	Laps	Points	Rank	Laps	Points	Rank
Roderick Chase	Points race	DNF			Did not advance		

== Diving ==
In total, one Barbadian athlete participated in the diving events – Christopher Honey in the 3 m springboard.

Athlete	Event	Qualification		Final	
Athlete	Event	Points	Rank	Points	Rank
Christopher Honey	3 m springboard	347.22	33	Did not advance	

== Judo ==
In total, one Barbadian athlete participated in the judo events – James Waithe in the men's –86 kg category.

Athlete	Event	Round of 64	Round of 32	Round of 16	Quarterfinals	Semifinals	Repechage			Final	
Athlete	Event	Round of 64	Round of 32	Round of 16	Quarterfinals	Semifinals	Round 1	Round 2	Round 3	Final	
Athlete	Event	Opposition Result	Opposition Result	Opposition Result	Opposition Result	Opposition Result	Opposition Result	Opposition Result	Opposition Result	Opposition Result	Rank
James Waithe	86 kg	Bye	Liu (CHN); L Ippon	Did not advance							

== Sailing ==
In total, four Barbadian athletes participated in the sailing events – Shane Atwell in the finn, Howard Palmer and Michael Green in the star and Brian Talma in the men's division II.

Open

Athlete	Event	Race							Net points	Final rank
Athlete	Event	1	2	3	4	5	6	7	Net points	Final rank
Brian Talma	Division II	~~52~~	43	45	41	25	43	33	230	33
Shane Atwell	Finn	33	34	33	34	~~40~~	32	25	191	28
Howard Palmer; Michael Green	Star	~~28~~	24	20	18	13	23	16	114	14

== Swimming ==
In total, one Barbadian athlete participated in the swimming events – Paul Yelle in the men's 50 m freestyle, the men's 100 m freestyle and the men's 100 m butterfly.

Athlete	Event	Heats		Final A/B	
Athlete	Event	Time	Rank	Time	Rank
Paul Yelle	50 metre freestyle	25.15	49	Did not advance	
Paul Yelle	100 metre freestyle	55.35	61	Did not advance	
Paul Yelle	100 metre butterfly	57.36	34	Did not advance	
