= Cycling at the 1988 Summer Olympics – Men's individual pursuit =

The Men's Individual Pursuit was a cycling event at the 1988 Summer Olympics in Seoul, South Korea which was held between 20 and 22 September 1988. There were a total number of 23 participants.

== Qualification ==
4000 metre time trial, with the top 16 riders advancing.

Rank	Rider	Time
1	Bernd Dittert (GDR)	4:34.45
2	Gintautas Umaras (URS)	4:35.03
3	Colin Sturgess (GBR)	4:35.42
4	Dean Woods (AUS)	4:35.89
5	Ryszard Dawidowicz (POL)	4:36.21
6	Peter Clausen (DEN)	4:38.88
7	Ivan Beltrami (ITA)	4:40.94
8	Gary Anderson (NZL)	4:41.83
9	Bruno Risi (SUI)	4:43.41
10	Thomas Dürst (FRG)	4:45.59
11	Jyrki Tujunen (FIN)	4:47.05
12	Gabriel Curuchet (ARG)	4:47.18
13	Roman Čermák (TCH)	4:47.63
14	David Brinton (USA)	4:48.93
15	Miklós Somogyi (HUN)	4:49.38
16	Erik Cent (NED)	4:54.16
17	José Antonio Martiarena (ESP)	4:54.39
18	Patrick Matt (LIE)	4:57.47
19	Park Min-su (KOR)	4:58.57
20	Antônio Silvestre (BRA)	5:02.07
	Realdo Jessurun (SUR)	DNF
	Moustafa Chichi (IRI)	DNF
	Ira Fabian (ANT)	DNS

== Match round ==
In the match round, the top 16 riders from the qualification round were matched together, 1 vs. 16, 2 vs. 15, 3 vs. 14, 4 vs. 13, etc. for the Round of 16. In the Round of 16, the winner of each match advanced to race in the Quarterfinals.

=== Round of 16 ===
Match 1

Name	Time	
Gary Anderson (NZL)	4:41.25	O
Bruno Risi (SUI)	4:44.38	X

Match 2

Name	Time	
Ivan Beltrami (ITA)	4:44.33	O
Thomas Dürst (FRG)	4:45.20	X

Match 3

Name	Time	
Peter Clausen (DEN)	4:43.71	O
Jyrki Tujunen (FIN)	4:46.65	X

Match 4

Name	Time	
Ryszard Dawidowicz (POL)	4:42.03	O
Gabriel Curuchet (ARG)	4:50.75	X

Match 5

Name	Time	
Dean Woods (AUS)	4:36.49	O
Roman Čermák (TCH)	DNF	X

Match 6

Name	Time	
Colin Sturgess (GBR)	4:37.17	O
David Brinton (USA)	4:47.27	X

Match 7

Name	Time	
Gintautas Umaras (URS)	4:35.32	O
Miklós Somogyi (HUN)	DNF	X

Match 8

Name	Time	
Bernd Dittert (GDR)	4:36.01	O
Erik Cent (NED)	DNF	X

=== Quarterfinal ===
Match 1

Name	Time	
Colin Sturgess (GBR)	4:39.39	O
Gary Anderson (NZL)	4:42.82	X

Match 2

Name	Time	
Dean Woods (AUS)	4:35.11	O
Ryszard Dawidowicz (POL)	4:39.44	X

Match 3

Name	Time	
Bernd Dittert (GDR)	4:33.70	O
Peter Clausen (DEN)	4:42.62	X

Match 4

Name	Time	
Gintautas Umaras (URS)	4:32.83	O
Ivan Beltrami (ITA)	DNF	X

=== Semifinal ===
Match 1

Name	Time	
Dean Woods (AUS)	4:35.02	O
Bernd Dittert (GDR)	4:39.06	X

Match 2

Name	Time	
Gintautas Umaras (URS)	4:40.24	O
Colin Sturgess (GBR)	4:46.25	X

=== Finals ===
Bronze Medal Match

Name	Time	
Bernd Dittert (GDR)	4:34.17	O
Colin Sturgess (GBR)	4:34.90	X

Gold Medal Match

Name	Time	
Gintautas Umaras (URS)	4:32.00	O
Dean Woods (AUS)	4:35.00	X
