= Netherlands at the 1988 Summer Olympics =

- Flag of the Netherlands
- IOC code: NED (HOL used at these Games)
- NOC: Dutch Olympic Committee

in Seoul
- Competitors: 147 (93 men and 54 women) in 17 sports
- Flag bearer: Eric Swinkels
- Medals Ranked 22nd: Gold 2 Silver 2 Bronze 5 Total 9

Summer Olympics appearances (overview)
- 1900; 1904; 1908; 1912; 1920; 1924; 1928; 1932; 1936; 1948; 1952; 1956; 1960; 1964; 1968; 1972; 1976; 1980; 1984; 1988; 1992; 1996; 2000; 2004; 2008; 2012; 2016; 2020; 2024; 2028

Other related appearances
- 1906 Intercalated Games

The Netherlands competed at the 1988 Summer Olympics in Seoul, Republic of Korea. 147 competitors, 93 men and 54 women, took part in 86 events in 17 sports.

== Medalists ==
| Medal | Name | Sport | Event | Date |
|---|---|---|---|---|
| Gold | Ronald Florijn; Nico Rienks | Rowing | Men's double sculls | 24 September |
| Gold | Monique Knol | Cycling | Women's individual road race | 26 September |
| Silver | Karin Brienesse; Marianne Muis; Mildred Muis; Conny van Bentum; Diane van der Plaats | Swimming | Women's 4 × 100 metre freestyle relay | 22 September |
| Silver | Leo Peelen | Cycling | Men's points race | 24 September |
| Bronze | Ben Spijkers | Judo | Men's 86 kg | 29 September |
| Bronze | Arnold Vanderlijde | Boxing | Heavyweight | 29 September |
| Bronze | Annemarie Cox; Annemiek Derckx | Canoeing | Women's K-2 500 metres | 30 September |
| Bronze | Netherlands women's national field hockey team: Det de Beus; Yvonne Buter; Willemien Aardenburg; Laurien Willemse; Marjolein Bolhuis-Eijsvogel; Lisanne Lejeune; Carina Benninga; Annemieke Fokke; Ingrid Wolff; Marieke van Doorn; Sophie von Weiler; Aletta van Manen; Noor Holsboer; Helen van der Ben; Martine Ohr; Anneloes Nieuwenhuizen | Field hockey | Women's tournament | 30 September |
| Bronze | Netherlands men's national field hockey team: Frank Leistra; Marc Benninga; Cees Jan Diepeveen; Maurits Crucq; René Klaassen; Hendrik Jan Kooijman; Marc Delissen; Jacques Brinkman; Gert Jan Schlatmann; Tim Steens; Floris Jan Bovelander; Patrick Faber; Ronald Jansen; Hidde Kruize; Erik Parlevliet; Taco van den Honert | Field hockey | Men's tournament | 1 October |

== Competitors ==
The following is the list of number of competitors in the Games.

| Sport | Men | Women | Total |
|---|---|---|---|
| Archery | 1 | 2 | 3 |
| Athletics | 9 | 9 | 18 |
| Boxing | 2 | – | 2 |
| Canoeing | 0 | 2 | 2 |
| Cycling | 10 | 3 | 13 |
| Diving | 1 | 1 | 2 |
| Equestrian | 4 | 4 | 8 |
| Fencing | 5 | 0 | 5 |
| Field hockey | 16 | 16 | 32 |
| Judo | 3 | – | 3 |
| Rowing | 11 | 5 | 16 |
| Sailing | 10 | 2 | 12 |
| Shooting | 4 | 1 | 5 |
| Swimming | 4 | 7 | 11 |
| Table tennis | 0 | 2 | 2 |
| Tennis | 1 | 0 | 1 |
| Volleyball | 12 | 0 | 12 |
| Total | 93 | 54 | 147 |

== Archery ==
Martinus Reniers made his third appearance for the Netherlands in archery. He had his best finish yet, advancing to the final and ending up in 5th place. The Dutch women, both new to Olympic competition, were not as successful.

| Athlete | Event | Open round | | 1/8 final | | Quarterfinal | | Semifinal | | Grand final | |
| Athlete | Event | Score | Rank | Score | Rank | Score | Rank | Score | Rank | Score | Rank |
|---|---|---|---|---|---|---|---|---|---|---|---|
| Martinus Reniers | Men's individual | 1286 | 5 | 328 | 1 | 328 | 2 | 324 | 8 | 327 | 5 |
| Jacqueline van Rozendaal | Women's individual | 1246 | 18 | 293 | 23 | Did not advance | | | | | |
| Anita Smits | Women's individual | 1203 | 43 | Did not advance | | | | | | | |

== Athletics ==
Key

- Note–Ranks given for track events are within the athlete's heat only
- Q = Qualified for the next round
- q = Qualified for the next round as a fastest loser or, in field events, by position without achieving the qualifying target
- NR = National record
- N/A = Round not applicable for the event
- Bye = Athlete not required to compete in round

Men
Track & road events

| Athlete | Event | Heat | | Quarterfinal | | Semifinal | | Final | |
| Athlete | Event | Result | Rank | Result | Rank | Result | Rank | Result | Rank |
|---|---|---|---|---|---|---|---|---|---|
| Rob Druppers | 800 m | 1:47.48 | 2 Q | 1:46.91 | 5 | Did not advance | | | |
| Robin van Helden | 800 m | 1:46.99 | 2 Q | 1:46.61 | 7 | Did not advance | | | |
| Han Kulker | 1500 m | 3:40.90 | 2 Q | —N/a | | 3:39.06 | 4 Q | 3:37.08 | 6 |
| Marti ten Kate | 10.000 m | 28:23.23 | 12 q | —N/a | | | | 27:50.30 | 9 |
| Hans Koeleman | 3000 m steeplechase | 8:35.20 | 7 Q | —N/a | | 8:21.86 | 8 | Did not advance | |
| Gerard Nijboer | Marathon | —N/a | | | | | | 2:14:40 | 13 |
| Marti ten Kate | Marathon | —N/a | | | | | | 2:14:53 | 15 |

Field events

| Athlete | Event | Qualification | | Final | |
| Athlete | Event | Result | Rank | Result | Rank |
|---|---|---|---|---|---|
| Erik de Bruin | Discus | 61.66 | 10 Q | 63.06 | 9 |
| Emiel Mellaard | Long Jump | 8.02 | 5 Q | 7.71 | 11 |

Combined events – Decathlon

| Athlete | Event | 100 m | LJ | SP | HJ | 400 m | 110H | DT | PV | JT | 1500 m | Final | Rank |
|---|---|---|---|---|---|---|---|---|---|---|---|---|---|
| Robert de Wit | Result | 11.05 | 6.95 | 15.34 | 2.00 | 48.21 | 13.36 | 41.32 | 4.80 | 63.00 | 4:25.86 | 8189 | 8 |
| Robert de Wit | Points | | | | | | | | | | | 8189 | 8 |

Women
Track & road events

| Athlete | Event | Heat | | Quarterfinal | | Semifinal | | Final | |
| Athlete | Event | Result | Rank | Result | Rank | Result | Rank | Result | Rank |
|---|---|---|---|---|---|---|---|---|---|
| Nelli Cooman | 100 m | 11.22 | 2 Q | 11.08 | 4 Q | 11.13 | 7 | Did not advance | |
| Els Vader | 100 m | 11.38 | 3 Q | 11.51 | 6 | Did not advance | | | |
| Yvonne van Dorp | 400 m | 52.84 | 3 Q | 53.50 | 6 | Did not advance | | | |
| Elly van Hulst | 1500 m | 4:07.40 | | —N/a | | | | Did not advance | |
| Elly van Hulst | 3000 m | 8:48.54 | 2 | —N/a | | | | 8:43.92 | 9 |
| Carla Beurskens | Marathon | —N/a | | | | | | 2:37:52 | 34 |

Women's 100m Hurdles

- Marjan Olyslager

- Heat 1 — 13.04s
- Heat 2 — 13.02s
- Semi Final — 13.08s (→ did not advance)

- Gretha Tromp

- Heat 1 — 13.48s
- Heat 2 — 13.42s (→ did not advance)

Women's 400m Hurdles

- Gretha Tromp

- Heat 1 — 56.11s
- Semi Final — 57.57s (→ did not advance)

Women's 4 × 100 m Relay

- Nelli Cooman, Gretha Tromp, Marjan Olyslager, and Els Scharn

- Heat 1 — 43.96s
- Semi Final — 43.48s (→ did not advance)

Field events

| Athlete | Event | Qualification | | Final | |
| Athlete | Event | Result | Rank | Result | Rank |
|---|---|---|---|---|---|
| Marjon Wijnsma | Long jump | 6.39 | 15 | Did not advance | |

Combined events – Heptathlon

- Marjon Wijnsma

- Final Round — 6205 points (→ 11th place)

== Boxing ==
Men's Featherweight (57 kg)

- Regilio Tuur

- First Round — Defeated Kelcie Banks (USA) on knock-out
- Second Round — Defeated John Wanjau (Kenya) on points
- Third Round — Defeated David Anderson (Great Britain) on points
- Quarter Finals — Lost to Daniel Dumitrescu (Romania) on points

Men's Heavyweight (91 kg)

- Arnold Vanderlyde → Bronze Medal

- First Round — Bye
- Second Round — Defeated Henry Akinwande (Great Britain) on points
- Quarter Finals — Defeated Gyula Alvics (Hungary) on points
- Semi Finals — Lost to Ray Mercer (USA) after referee stopped contest

== Cycling ==
Thirteen cyclists, ten men and three women, represented the Netherlands in 1988. Monique Knol won gold in the women's road race.

Men's road race

- Michel Zanoli — 4:32:56 (→ 15th place)
- Rob Harmeling — 4:32:56 (→ 38th place)
- Tom Cordes — 4:32:56 (→ 42nd place)

Men's team time trial

- Tom Cordes
- Gerrit de Vries
- Maarten den Bakker
- Michel Zanoli

Men's 1 km time trial

- Thierry Détant

Men's individual pursuit

- Erik Cent

Men's team pursuit

- Marcel Beumer
- Erik Cent
- Leo Peelen
- Mario van Baarle

Men's points race

- Leo Peelen

Women's road race

- Monique Knol — 2:00:52 (→ Gold Medal)
- Heleen Hage — 2:00:52 (→ 19th place)
- Cora Westland — 2:01:50 (→ 46th place)

== Diving ==
Men

| Athlete | Event | Preliminary | | Final | |
| Athlete | Event | Points | Rank | Points | Rank |
|---|---|---|---|---|---|
| Edwin Jongejans | 3 m springboard | 591.45 | 6 Q | 588.33 | 8 |

Women

| Athlete | Event | Preliminary | | Final | |
| Athlete | Event | Points | Rank | Points | Rank |
|---|---|---|---|---|---|
| Daphne Jongejans | 3 m springboard | 461.85 | 7 Q | 465.45 | 8 |

== Fencing ==
Five fencers, all male, represented the Netherlands in 1988.

Men's épée

- Stéphane Ganeff
- Arwin Kardolus
- Michiel Driessen

Men's team épée

- Paul Besselink, Michiel Driessen, Stéphane Ganeff, Arwin Kardolus, Olaf Kardolus

== Swimming ==
Men's 50m Freestyle

- Hans Kroes

- Heat — 23.50 (→ did not advance, 20th place)

Men's 100m Freestyle

- Hans Kroes

- Heat — 51.65 (→ did not advance, 29th place)

- Patrick Dybiona

- Heat — 51.79 (→ did not advance, 30th place)

Men's 200m Freestyle

- Patrick Dybiona

- Heat — 1:52.67 (→ did not advance, 24th place)

Men's 100m Breaststroke

- Ron Dekker

- Heat — 1:03.08
- B-Final — 1:03.22 (→ 10th place)

Men's 200m Breaststroke

- Ron Dekker

- Heat — 2:20.84 (→ did not advance, 26th place)

Men's 100m Butterfly

- Frank Drost

- Heat — 55.38 (→ did not advance, 19th place)

Men's 200m Butterfly

- Frank Drost

- Heat — 2:00.99
- B-Final — 2:01.59 (→ 14th place)

Men's 4 × 100 m Freestyle Relay

- Frank Drost, Patrick Dybiona, Hans Kroes, and Ron Dekker

- Heat — 3:25.26 (→ did not advance, 11th place)

Men's 4 × 100 m Medley Relay

- Hans Kroes, Ron Dekker, Frank Drost, and Patrick Dybiona

- Heat — 3:45.65
- Final — 3:46.55 (→ 7th place)

Women's 50m Freestyle

- Karin Brienesse

- Heat — 26.54
- B-Final — 26.66 (→ 15th place)

- Diana van der Plaats

- Heat — 26.49
- B-Final — 26.80 (→ 16th place)

Women's 100m Freestyle

- Karin Brienesse

- Heat — 56.29
- Final — 56.15 (→ 6th place)

- Conny van Bentum

- Heat — 56.50
- Final — 56.54 (→ 8th place)

Women's 200m Freestyle

- Diana van der Plaats

- Heat — 2:03.02 (→ did not advance, 17th place)

- Karin Brienesse

- Heat — 2:04.36 (→ did not advance, 22nd place)

Women's 100m Backstroke

- Jolanda de Rover

- Heat — 1:04.39
- B-Final — 1:04.11 (→ 14th place)

Women's 200m Backstroke

- Jolanda de Rover

- Heat — 2:16.58
- Final — 2:15.17 (→ 7th place)

Women's 100m Breaststroke

- Linda Moes

- Heat — 1:11.84 (→ did not advance, 17th place)

Women's 200m Breaststroke

- Linda Moes

- Heat — 2:31.98
- B-Final — 2:30.83 (→ 11th place)

Women's 100m Butterfly

- Conny van Bentum

- Heat — 1:00.94
- Final — 1:00.62 (→ 6th place)

Women's 200m Butterfly

- Conny van Bentum

- Heat — 2:12.41
- Final — 2:13.17 (→ 8th place)

Women's 200m Individual Medley

- Marianne Muis

- Heat — 2:16.60
- Final — 2:16.40 (→ 5th place)

- Mildred Muis

- Heat — 2:19.46
- B-Final — 2:17.73 (→ 9th place)

Women's 400m Individual Medley

- Marianne Muis

- Heat — 4:56.31 (→ did not advance, 20th place)

- Mildred Muis

- Heat — 4:56.89 (→ did not advance, 21st place)

Women's 4 × 100 m Freestyle Relay

- Conny van Bentum, Marianne Muis, Mildred Muis, and Diana van der Plaats

- Heat — 3:44.12

- Marianne Muis, Mildred Muis, Conny van Bentum, and Karin Brienesse

- Final — 3:43.39 (→ Silver Medal)

Women's 4 × 100 m Medley Relay

- Jolanda de Rover, Linda Moes, Conny van Bentum, and Karin Brienesse

- Heat — 4:11.82
- Final — 4:12.19 (→ 5th place)

== Tennis ==
Men's Singles Competition

- Michiel Schapers

- First round — Defeated Andrei Chesnokov (Soviet Union) 6-3, 5-7, 6-0, 6-2
- Second round — Defeated Tony Mmoh (Nigeria) 4-6, 6-3, 6-1, 4-6, 6-1
- Third round — Defeated Sergio Casal (Spain) 6-4, 4-6, 2-6, 6-3, 6-4
- Quarter Finals — Lost to Miloslav Mečíř (Czechoslovakia) 6-3, 6-7, 2-6, 4-6

== Volleyball ==
=== Men's team competition ===
- Preliminary round (group B)

- Defeated France (3-1)
- Lost to the United States (1-3)
- Defeated Tunisia (3-0)
- Lost to Argentina (0-3)
- Defeated Japan (3-0)

- Classification Matches

- 5th/8th place: Defeated Sweden (3-2)
- 5th/6th place: Defeated Bulgaria (3-0) → Fifth place

- Team roster

- Edwin Benne
- Peter Blangé
- Ron Boudrie
- Marco Brouwers
- Teun Buijs
- Rob Grabert
- Pieter Jan Leeuwerink
- Jan Posthuma
- Avital Selinger
- Martin Teffer
- Ronald Zoodsma
- Ron Zwerver

- Head coach: Arie Selinger

== Demonstration events ==
- Annemiek van den Boogaart-Dagelet (bowling)
