= Sailing at the 1988 Summer Olympics – Tornado =

Sailing at the Olympics

Tornado at the Games of the XXIV Olympiad
- Tornado
- Venue: Busan 부산 釜山
- Dates: 20–27 September
- Competitors: 47 from 23 nations
- Teams: 23

Medalists
1st place, gold medalist(s)		Jean-Yves Le Déroff; Nicolas Hénard	France
2nd place, silver medalist(s)		Chris Timms; Rex Sellers	New Zealand
3rd place, bronze medalist(s)		Lars Grael; Clinio Freitas	Brazil

The Tornado was a sailing event on the Sailing at the 1988 Summer Olympics program in Pusan, South Korea. Seven races were scheduled. 47 sailors, on 23 boats, from 23 nations competed.

== Results ==
Rank	Helmsman (Country)	Crew	Race I		Race II		Race III		Race IV		Race V		Race VI		Race VII		Total Points	Total -1
Rank	Helmsman (Country)	Crew	Rank	Points	Rank	Points	Rank	Points	Rank	Points	Rank	Points	Rank	Points	Rank	Points	Total Points	Total -1
1st place, gold medalist(s)	Jean-Yves Le Déroff (FRA)	Nicolas Hénard	1	0.0	2	3.0	2	3.0	1	0.0	1	0.0	5	10.0	DNC	30.0	46.0	16.0
2nd place, silver medalist(s)	Chris Timms (NZL)	Rex Sellers	10	16.0	3	5.7	1	0.0	4	8.0	6	11.7	1	0.0	5	10.0	51.4	35.4
3rd place, bronze medalist(s)	Lars Grael (BRA)	Clinio Freitas	8	14.0	1	0.0	6	11.7	3	5.7	3	5.7	8	14.0	2	3.0	54.1	40.1
4	Norbert Petschel (AUT)	Christian Claus	2	3.0	11	17.0	8	14.0	5	10.0	4	8.0	2	3.0	4	8.0	63.0	46.0
5	Giorgio Zuccoli (ITA)	Luca Santella	9	15.0	6	11.7	3	5.7	7	13.0	2	3.0	15	21.0	6	11.7	81.1	60.1
6	Per Arne Nilsen (NOR)	Carl E. Johannessen	3	5.7	5	10.0	10	16.0	12	18.0	DNC	30.0	12	18.0	1	0.0	97.7	67.7
7	Yury Konovalov (URS)	Sergey Kravtsov	13	19.0	4	8.0	4	8.0	2	3.0	RET	30.0	7	13.0	13	19.0	100.0	70.0
8	Robert White (GBR)	Jeremy Newman	12	18.0	7	13.0	5	10.0	6	11.7	RET	30.0	6	11.7	3	5.7	100.1	70.1
9	Willy van Bladel (NED)	Cees van Bladel	4	8.0	16	22.0	13	19.0	9	15.0	7	13.0	3	5.7	RET	30.0	112.7	82.7
10	David Sweeney (CAN)	Kevin Smith	11	17.0	9	15.0	YMP	16.0	8	14.0	9	15.0	4	8.0	9	15.0	100.0	83.0
11	Bradley Schafferius (AUS)	Roger Colman	7	13.0	13	19.0	7	13.0	10	16.0	13	19.0	11	17.0	RET	30.0	127.0	97.0
12	Göran Marström (SWE)	Karl Strandman	5	10.0	17	23.0	9	15.0	11	17.0	11	17.0	10	16.0	RET	30.0	128.0	98.0
13	Enrique Figueroa (PUR)	Oscar Mercado	14	20.0	12	18.0	12	18.0	13	19.0	10	16.0	13	19.0	8	14.0	124.0	104.0
14	Pete Melvin (USA)	Patrick Muglia	6	11.7	10	16.0	RET	30.0	14	20.0	DSQ	30.0	9	15.0	12	18.0	140.7	110.7
15	Paul Elvstrøm (DEN)	Trine Elvstrøm-Myralf	16	22.0	14	20.0	RET	30.0	16	22.0	5	10.0	19	25.0	7	13.0	142.0	112.0
16	Park Byung-ki (KOR)	Shim Kyu-hae	RET	30.0	18	24.0	14	20.0	17	23.0	8	14.0	14	20.0	11	17.0	148.0	118.0
17	Raymond Cattin (SUI)	Edgar Röthlisberger	18	24.0	19	25.0	15	21.0	15	21.0	RET	30.0	16	22.0	10	16.0	159.0	129.0
18	Glenn Astwood (BER)	Eddie Bardgett	17	23.0	15	21.0	18	24.0	20	26.0	12	18.0	17	23.0	RET	30.0	165.0	135.0
19	Roland Gäbler (FRG)	Hans-Jürgen Pfohe	15	21.0	8	14.0	11	17.0	RET	30.0	DNC	30.0	DNC	30.0	DNC	30.0	172.0	142.0
20	Francisco García (ESP)	Luis López, Cristina De Borbón	19	25.0	20	26.0	19	25.0	18	24.0	RET	30.0	18	24.0	RET	30.0	184.0	154.0
21	Naoyuki Ogawa (JPN)	Takashi Tamura	20	26.0	22	28.0	17	23.0	19	25.0	RET	30.0	20	26.0	DNF	30.0	188.0	158.0
22	Jean Braure (ISV)	Hans Reiter	21	27.0	23	29.0	20	26.0	21	27.0	DNS	30.0	21	27.0	RET	30.0	196.0	166.0
23	Fernando García (ARG)	Diego Minguens	RET	30.0	21	27.0	16	22.0	RET	30.0	DNC	30.0	DNC	30.0	DNC	30.0	199.0	169.0

DNF = Did not finish, DSQ = Disqualified, PMS = Premature start
Crossed out results did not count for the total result.
= Male, = Female

=== Daily standings ===
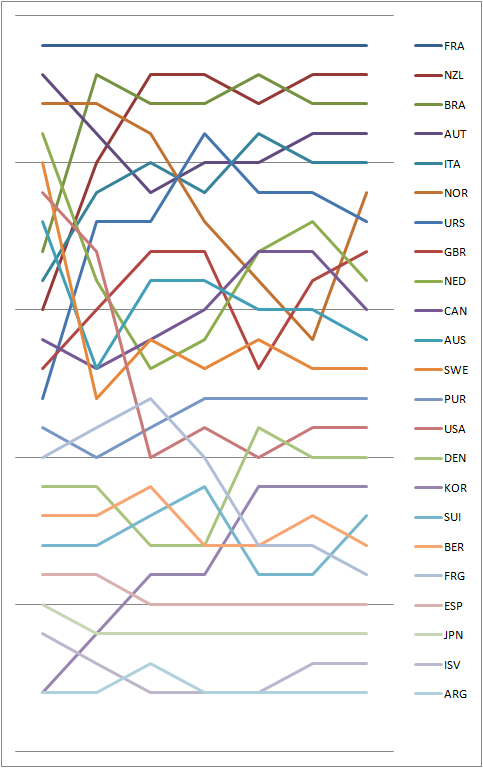
Graph showing the daily standings in the Tornado during the 1988 Summer Olympics
