= 1982 World Juniors Track Cycling Championships =

- Venue: Marsciano, Italy
- Date: August 1982

The 1982 World Juniors Track Cycling Championships were the eighth annual Junior World Championships for track cycling held in Marsciano, Italy in August 1982.

The Championships had five events for men only: Sprint, Points race, Individual pursuit, Team pursuit and 1 kilometre time trial.

== Events ==
Event	Gold	Silver	Bronze
Men's Events
Sprint	Nikolai Kovch; Soviet Union	Bill Huck; East Germany	Maik Krannig; East Germany
Points race	Mauro Ribeiro; Brazil	Philippe Grivel; Switzerland	Keun Heng Cho; South Korea
Individual pursuit	Carsten Wolf; East Germany	Marat Ganeyev; Soviet Union	Reinhard Alber; Germany
Team pursuit	Vladimir Diatchenko; Vassili Schpundov; Armand Freymanis; Valeri Grinskovski; Soviet Union	Carsten Wolf; Thomas Raddatz; Siegurt Müller; Eike Backhaus; East Germany	Lars Otto Olsen; Peter Clausen; Jorgen Falkboll; Kenneth Røpke; Denmark
Time trial	Andreas Ganske; East Germany	A Salvini; Italy	M Sourmava; Soviet Union

== Medal table ==
* Host nation (Italy)

Rank	Nation	Gold	Silver	Bronze	Total
1	East Germany (GDR)	2	2	1	5
2	Soviet Union (URS)	2	1	1	4
3	Brazil (BRA)	1	0	0	1
4	Italy (ITA)*	0	1	0	1
4	Switzerland (SWI)	0	1	0	1
6	Denmark (DEN)	0	0	1	1
6	Germany (GER)	0	0	1	1
6	South Korea (KOR)	0	0	1	1
Totals (8 entries)		5	5	5	15
