= Eftekhari =

Eftekhari (Persian: افتخاری, lit. "honorary") is an Iranian surname which can also be found in the Iranian diaspora. Notable people with the surname include:

- Akbar Eftekhari (born 1943), Iranian footballer
- Ali Eftekhari (born 1964), Iranian footballer
- Ali Reza Eftekhari (born 1958), Iranian classical and popular music vocalist
- Amir Eftekhari (born 1964), Iranian footballer
- Jalil Eftekhari (born 1965), Iranian cyclist
- Laleh Eftekhari (born 1959), Iranian politician
