= Swimming at the 1986 World Aquatics Championships – Men's 50 metre freestyle =

Men's 50 metre freestyle at the 1986 FINA World Championships
- Date: 22 August 1986
- Competitors: 51 from 34 nations
- Winning time: 22.49 seconds

Medalists
gold medal	Tom Jager	United States
silver medal	Dano Halsall	Switzerland
bronze medal	Matt Biondi	United States

The finals and the qualifying heats of the men's 50 metre freestyle event at the 1986 World Aquatics Championships were held on 22 August 1986 in Madrid, Spain.

== Results ==
=== Heats ===
Rank	Name	Nationality	Time	Notes
1	Stefan Volery	Switzerland	22.62	CR
2	Tom Jager	United States	22.66	
3	Ang Peng Siong	Singapore	22.71	
4	Dano Halsall	Switzerland	22.83	
5	Matt Biondi	United States	22.89	
6	Gennadiy Prigoda	Soviet Union	22.98	
7	Per Johansson	Sweden	23.03	NR
8	Jörg Woithe	East Germany	22.86	
9	Hans Kroes	Netherlands	23.27	
10	Greg Fasala	Australia	23.42	
11	Franz Mortensen	Denmark	23.48	
12	Nils Liedberg	Sweden	23.49	
13	Andy Jameson	Great Britain	23.51	
14	Patrick Dybiona	Netherlands	23.54	
15	Matthias Lutze	East Germany	23.56	
16	Blair Hicken	Canada	23.57	NR
17	Marcos Goldenstein	Brazil	23.59	
17	Tzvetan Golomeev	Bulgaria	23.59	NR
19	Giovanni Franceschi	Italy	23.63	
20	Sergey Smiriagin	Soviet Union	23.66	
21	Andre Schadt	West Germany	23.75	
22	Petr Kladiva	Czechoslovakia	23.80	
23	Fernando Rodríguez	Peru	23.91	NR
24	Mark Foster	Great Britain	23.97	
25	Matthew Renshaw	Australia	24.01	
26	Jose Medina	Mexico	24.11	
27	Cyro Delgado	Brazil	24.12	
28	Regent Lacoursiere	Canada	24.13	
29	Sergio Esteves	Portugal	24.15	
30	Luis Manuel Martin	Spain	24.16	
31	Yves Clausse	Luxembourg	24.32	
32	Katsunori Fujiwara	Japan	24.36	
33	Alexander Pilhatsch	Austria	24.40	
34	Anthony Nesty	Suriname	24.45	NR
35	Antonio Portela	Puerto Rico	24.46	
36	Hans Foerster	United States Virgin Islands	24.50	NR
37	Lyes Mahfoudia	Algeria	24.57	NR
38	Declan Connaughton	Ireland	24.61	
39	Sadri Ozun	Turkey	24.64	
40	Mohamed Yussef	Egypt	24.71	NR
41	Joaquin Herrero	Spain	24.73	
42	Manuel Guzman	Puerto Rico	24.82	
43	Harald Sinzinger	Austria	24.96	
44	Juan Tavares	Dominican Republic	25.05	
45	Ayman Nadim	Egypt	25.31	
46	Lee Ta Lin	Chinese Taipei	25.32	
47	Ronald Pickard	United States Virgin Islands	25.47	
48	Mika Lohi	Finland	25.53	
49	Chen Cheng I	Chinese Taipei	25.91	
50	Michele Piva	San Marino	26.29	
51	Daniele Piva	San Marino	27.11	

=== B Final ===
Rank	Name	Nationality	Time	Notes
9	Greg Fasala	Australia	23.01	
10	Hans Kroes	Netherlands	23.31	
11	Nils Liedberg	Sweden	23.53	
12	Patrick Dybiona	Netherlands	23.55	
13	Franz Mortensen	Denmark	23.71	
14	Andy Jameson	Great Britain	23.73	
15	Matthias Lutze	East Germany	23.74	
16	Blair Hicken	Canada	23.78	

=== A Final ===
Rank	Name	Nationality	Time	Notes
1st place, gold medalist(s)	Tom Jager	United States	22.49	CR
2nd place, silver medalist(s)	Dano Halsall	Switzerland	22.80	
3rd place, bronze medalist(s)	Matt Biondi	United States	22.85	
4	Ang Peng Siong	Singapore	23.03	
5	Stefan Volery	Switzerland	23.08	
6	Per Johansson	Sweden	23.10	
7	Jörg Woithe	East Germany	23.12	
8	Gennadiy Prigoda	Soviet Union	23.27	

== See also ==
- Swimming at the 1988 Summer Olympics – Men's 50 metre freestyle
