= Uruguay at the 1988 Summer Olympics =

- IOC code: URU
- NOC: Uruguayan Olympic Committee

in Seoul
- Competitors: 15 (14 men and 1 woman) in 8 sports
- Flag bearer: Jesús Posse
- Medals: Gold 0 Silver 0 Bronze 0 Total 0

Summer Olympics appearances (overview)
- 1924; 1928; 1932; 1936; 1948; 1952; 1956; 1960; 1964; 1968; 1972; 1976; 1980; 1984; 1988; 1992; 1996; 2000; 2004; 2008; 2012; 2016; 2020; 2024

Uruguay competed at the 1988 Summer Olympics in Seoul, South Korea. 15 competitors, 14 men and 1 woman, took part in 14 events in 8 sports.

== Competitors ==
The following is the list of number of competitors in the Games.

Sport	Men	Women	Total
Athletics	0	1	1
Boxing	2	–	2
Cycling	3	0	3
Modern pentathlon	1	–	1
Rowing	1	0	1
Sailing	5	0	5
Swimming	1	0	1
Weightlifting	1	–	1
Total	14	1	15

== Athletics ==
- Claudia Acerenza

== Boxing ==
- Daniel Freitas
- Juan Montiel

== Cycling ==
Three male cyclists represented Uruguay in 1988.

Men's road race

- José Asconeguy
- Alcides Etcheverry

Men's points race

- Federico Moreira

== Gymnastics ==
- Germán Tozdjian

== Modern pentathlon ==
One male pentathlete represented Uruguay in 1988.

Men's Individual Competition

- Alejandro Michelena — 3790 pts (→ 62nd place)

Men's Team Competition

- Alejandro Michelena — 3790 pts (→ 25th place)

== Rowing ==
- Jesús Posse

== Sailing ==
- Heber Ansorena
- Horacio Carabelli
- Luis Chiapparro
- Alejandro Ferreiro
- Bernd Knuppel

== Swimming ==
Men's 100m Freestyle

- Carlos Scanavino
  1. Heat – 52.52 (→ did not advance, 39th place)

Men's 200m Freestyle

- Carlos Scanavino
  1. Heat – 1:51.42 (→ did not advance, 19th place)

Men's 400m Freestyle

- Carlos Scanavino
  1. Heat – 3:54.86
  2. B-Final – 3:54.36 (→ 12th place)
