= Cycling at the 1988 Summer Olympics – Men's individual road race =

Men's road race at the Games of the XXIV Olympiad
- Venue: Seoul
- Date: September 27
- Competitors: 136 from 54 nations
- Winning time: 4:32:22

Medalists
1st place, gold medalist(s)		Olaf Ludwig; East Germany
2nd place, silver medalist(s)		Bernd Gröne; West Germany
3rd place, bronze medalist(s)		Christian Henn; West Germany

The men's individual road race at the 1988 Summer Olympics in Seoul, South Korea, was held on September 27, 1988. There were 136 participants from 54 nations in the race over 196.80 km, with 27 cyclists who did not finish. The maximum number of cyclists per nation was three, down from four in previous editions of the event. The event was won by Olaf Ludwig of East Germany, the first medal for the nation in the men's individual road race (and first victory for any German cyclist). West Germany also earned its first medals in the event, with Bernd Gröne's silver and Christian Henn's bronze.

== Background ==
This was the 13th appearance of the event, previously held in 1896 and then at every Summer Olympics since 1936. It replaced the individual time trial event that had been held from 1912 to 1932 (and which would be reintroduced alongside the road race in 1996).

Algeria, Andorra, the People's Republic of China, Chinese Taipei, the Republic of the Congo, Monaco, Sierra Leone, Suriname, and the United Arab Emirates each made their debut in the men's individual road race. Great Britain made its 13th appearance in the event, the only nation to have competed in each appearance to date.

== Competition format and course ==
The mass-start race was on a 196.8 kilometre course over the Tongil-ro Circuit in Paju. The course was "very flat and easy."

== Schedule ==
All times are Korea Standard Time adjusted for daylight savings (UTC+10)

Date	Time	Round
Tuesday, 27 September 1988	9:00	Final

== Results ==
The easy course kept the cyclists together and limited non-finishers; nearly 100 cyclists moved in a large pack through most of the race. Ludwig made two break attempts late, being caught by renowned sprinter Abdoujaparov and aborting the charge the first time. For the second breakaway, he was joined by Gröne; this time, Ludwig continued his attack and outsprinted Gröne at the end to win.

Rank	Cyclist	Nation	Time
1st place, gold medalist(s)	Olaf Ludwig	East Germany	4:32:22
2nd place, silver medalist(s)	Bernd Gröne	West Germany	4:32:25
3rd place, bronze medalist(s)	Christian Henn	West Germany	4:32:46
4	Bob Mionske	United States	s.t.
5	Djamolidine Abdoujaparov	Soviet Union	s.t.
6	Edward Salas	Australia	s.t.
7	Roberto Pelliconi	Italy	s.t.
8	Graeme Miller	New Zealand	s.t.
9	Emili Pérez	Andorra	s.t.
10	Jozef Regec	Czechoslovakia	s.t.
11	Jan Mattheus	Belgium	s.t.
12	Hung Chung Yam	Hong Kong	s.t.
13	Atle Pedersen	Norway	s.t.
14	Remig Stumpf	West Germany	4:32:56
15	Michel Zanoli	Netherlands	s.t.
16	Fabrizio Bontempi	Italy	s.t.
17	Zdzisław Wrona	Poland	s.t.
18	Neil Hoban	Great Britain	s.t.
19	Johnny Dauwe	Belgium	s.t.
20	Cássio Freitas	Brazil	s.t.
21	Park Hyeon-gon	South Korea	s.t.
22	Mario Traxl	Austria	s.t.
23	Uwe Raab	East Germany	s.t.
24	Jean-François Laffillé	France	s.t.
25	Mitsuhiro Suzuki	Japan	s.t.
26	Marcel Stäuble	Switzerland	s.t.
27	Erik Johan Sæbø	Norway	s.t.
28	Jacek Bodyk	Poland	s.t.
29	Yvan Waddell	Canada	s.t.
30	Rajko Čubrić	Yugoslavia	s.t.
31	Juan Arias	Colombia	s.t.
32	Mićo Brković	Yugoslavia	s.t.
33	Brian Walton	Canada	s.t.
34	Johann Lienhart	Austria	s.t.
35	Daniel Steiger	Switzerland	s.t.
36	Paul Curran	Great Britain	s.t.
37	Jari Lähde	Finland	s.t.
38	Rob Harmeling	Netherlands	s.t.
39	Mohamed Mir	Algeria	s.t.
40	Gianluca Bortolami	Italy	s.t.
41	Dietmar Hauer	Austria	s.t.
42	Tom Cordes	Netherlands	s.t.
43	Michel Lafis	Sweden	s.t.
44	Tang Xuezhong	China	s.t.
45	Cormac McCann	Ireland	s.t.
46	José Asconeguy	Uruguay	s.t.
47	Luděk Štyks	Czechoslovakia	s.t.
48	Nelson Rodríguez Serna	Colombia	s.t.
49	John McQuaid	Ireland	s.t.
50	Leung Hung Tak	Hong Kong	s.t.
51	Asiat Saitov	Soviet Union	s.t.
52	Eduardo Manrique	Spain	s.t.
53	Liu Hong	China	s.t.
54	Peter Hermann	Liechtenstein	s.t.
55	Chow Tai Ming	Hong Kong	s.t.
56	Iraj Amir-Akhori	Iran	s.t.
57	Anders Jarl	Sweden	s.t.
58	Perry Merren	Cayman Islands	s.t.
59	Xavier Pérez	Andorra	s.t.
60	Riho Suun	Soviet Union	s.t.
61	Luboš Lom	Czechoslovakia	s.t.
62	Mark Gornall	Great Britain	s.t.
63	Wanderley Magalhães Azevedo	Brazil	s.t.
64	Realdo Jessurun	Suriname	s.t.
65	Scott McKinley	United States	s.t.
66	Marcos Mazzaron	Brazil	s.t.
67	Dubán Ramírez	Colombia	s.t.
68	Geir Dahlen	Norway	s.t.
69	Craig Schommer	United States	s.t.
70	Claude Carlin	France	s.t.
71	Tommy Nielsen	Denmark	s.t.
72	Kyoshi Miura	Japan	s.t.
73	Gervais Rioux	Canada	s.t.
74	Peter Meinert Nielsen	Denmark	s.t.
75	Brian Fowler	New Zealand	s.t.
76	Alcides Etcheverry	Uruguay	s.t.
77	Luis Rosendo Ramos	Mexico	s.t.
78	Valter Bonča	Yugoslavia	s.t.
79	Felice Puttini	Switzerland	s.t.
80	Gonzalo Aguiar	Spain	s.t.
81	Paul McCormack	Ireland	s.t.
82	Uwe Ampler	East Germany	s.t.
83	Leonardo Sierra	Venezuela	s.t.
84	Andrés Torres	Guatemala	s.t.
85	Lee Jin-ok	South Korea	s.t.
86	Óscar Aquino	Guatemala	s.t.
87	Raoul Fahlin	Sweden	s.t.
88	Frank Francken	Belgium	s.t.
89	Iván Alemany	Spain	s.t.
90	Sin Dae-cheol	South Korea	4:34:13
91	Laurent Bezault	France	4:35:19
91	Murugayan Kumaresan	Malaysia	4:35:45
92	Syamak Zafarzadeh	Iran	4:42:47
93	Héctor Pérez	Mexico	s.t.
94	Yoshihiro Tsumuraya	Japan	s.t.
95	Sebti Benzine	Algeria	4:43:15
96	Raymond Thomas	Jamaica	s.t.
97	Mobange Amisi	Republic of the Congo	s.t.
98	Pierre Gouws	Zimbabwe	4:43:28
100	Víctor Lechuga	Guatemala	4:44:37
101	Sultan Khalifa	United Arab Emirates	s.t.
102	Richard Pascal	Cayman Islands	4:44:56
103	Domingo Villanueva	Philippines	4:45:20
104	Kimpale Mosengo	Republic of the Congo	s.t.
105	Gary Mandy	Zimbabwe	4:45:50
106	Stéphane Operto	Monaco	4:46:42
107	Arthur Tenn	Jamaica	4:48:06
108	Andrzej Mierzejewski	Poland	s.t.
109	Dyton Chimwaza	Malawi	4:52:43
—	Scott Steward	Australia	DNF
—	Stephen Fairless	Australia	DNF
—	Michael Lewis	Belize	DNF
—	Earl Theus	Belize	DNF
—	Fitzgerald Joseph	Belize	DNF
—	Michele Smith	Cayman Islands	DNF
—	Cai Yingquan	China	DNF
—	Hsu Jui-te	Chinese Taipei	DNF
—	Ndjibu N'Golomingi	Republic of the Congo	DNF
—	Byron James	Guyana	DNF
—	Mohammad Reza Bajool	Iran	DNF
—	Georges Honein	Lebanon	DNF
—	Hratch Zadourian	Lebanon	DNF
—	Abdel Hamed El-Hadi	Libya	DNF
—	Abdullah Badri	Libya	DNF
—	Patrick Matt	Liechtenstein	DNF
—	Amadu Yusufu	Malawi	DNF
—	George Nayeja	Malawi	DNF
—	Gabriel Cano	Mexico	DNF
—	Wayne Morgan	New Zealand	DNF
—	Norberto Oconer	Philippines	DNF
—	Frank Williams	Sierra Leone	DNF
—	Khalifa Bin Omair	United Arab Emirates	DNF
—	Issa Mohamed	United Arab Emirates	DNF
—	Enrique Campos	Venezuela	DNF
—	Ali Parra	Venezuela	DNF
—	Huỳnh Châu	Vietnam	DNF

== See also ==
- Women's Individual Road Race
