= Finland at the 1988 Summer Olympics =

- IOC code: FIN
- NOC: Finnish Olympic Committee

in Seoul, South Korea September 17–October 2, 1988
- Competitors: 78 (59 men, 19 women) in 15 sports
- Flag bearer: Jouko Salomäki (wrestling)
- Medals Ranked 25th: Gold 1 Silver 1 Bronze 2 Total 4

Summer Olympics appearances (overview)
- 1908; 1912; 1920; 1924; 1928; 1932; 1936; 1948; 1952; 1956; 1960; 1964; 1968; 1972; 1976; 1980; 1984; 1988; 1992; 1996; 2000; 2004; 2008; 2012; 2016; 2020; 2024

Other related appearances
- 1906 Intercalated Games

Finland competed at the 1988 Summer Olympics in Seoul, South Korea. 78 competitors, 59 men and 19 women, took part in 66 events in 15 sports.

== Competitors ==
The following is the list of number of competitors in the Games.

Sport	Men	Women	Total
Archery	3	3	6
Athletics	11	7	18
Boxing	3	–	3
Canoeing	3	0	3
Cycling	3	1	4
Diving	1	0	1
Equestrian	0	4	4
Fencing	1	0	1
Judo	2	–	2
Rowing	5	0	5
Sailing	3	2	5
Shooting	7	2	9
Swimming	1	0	1
Weightlifting	4	–	4
Wrestling	12	–	12
Total	59	19	78

== Medalists ==
Medal	Name	Sport	Event	Date
Gold	Tapio Korjus	Athletics	Men's javelin throw	25 September
Silver	Harri Koskela	Wrestling	Men's Greco-Roman 90 kg	20 September
Bronze	Tapio Sipilä	Wrestling	Men's Greco-Roman 68 kg	22 September
Bronze	Seppo Räty	Athletics	Men's javelin throw	25 September

== Archery ==
The Finnish team did not fare as well at the 1988 Olympic archery competition as they had previously, though the men's team was almost able to capture a medal. Only one archer placed in the top eight in individual competition.

Women's Individual Competition:

- Päivi Aaltonen — 1/8 Final (→ 20th place)
- Jutta Poikolainen — Preliminary Round (→ 55th place)
- Minna Heinonen — Preliminary Round (→ 56th place)

Men's Individual Competition:

- Pentti Vikström — Final (→ 7th place)
- Tomi Poikolainen — Semifinal (→ 11th place)
- Ismo Falck — Preliminary Round (→ 27th place)

Women's Team Competition:

- Aaltonen, Poikolainen, and Heinonen — Preliminary Round (→ 13th place)

Men's Team Competition:

- Vikstrom, Poikolainen, and Falck — Final (→ 4th place)

== Athletics ==
Men's Long Jump

- Jarmo Kärnä
  - Qualification — 7.90m
  - Final — 7.82m (→ 10th place)

Men's Hammer Throw

- Harri Huhtala
  - Qualification — 77.34m
  - Final — 75.38m (→ 9th place)
- Juha Tiainen
  - Qualification — 73.24m (→ did not advance)

Men's Javelin Throw

- Tapio Korjus
  - Qualification — 81.42m
  - Final — 84.28m (→ Gold Medal)
- Seppo Räty
  - Qualification — 81.62m
  - Final — 83.26m (→ Bronze Medal)
- Kimmo Kinnunen
  - Qualification — 80.24m
  - Final — 78.04m (→ 10th place)

Men's 50 km Walk

- Reima Salonen
  - Final — 3'51:36 (→ 18th place)

Men's Decathlon

- Petri Keskitalo — 8143 points (→ 11th place)

1. 100 metres — 10.94s
2. Long Jump — 7.56m
3. Shot Put — 15.34m
4. High Jump — 1.97m
5. 400 metres — 49.94s
6. 110m Hurdles — 14.25s
7. Discus Throw — 41.86m
8. Pole Vault — 4.80m
9. Javelin Throw — 66.64m
10. 1.500 metres — 4:55.89s

Women's Marathon

- Tuija Jousimaa
  - Final – 2:43:00 (→ 41st place)
- Sinikka Keskitalo
  - Final – 2:43:00 (→ 42nd place)

Women's Javelin Throw

- Päivi Alafrantti
  - Qualification – 62.82m
  - Final – 58.20m (→ 10th place)
- Tiina Lillak
  - Qualification – 60.06m (→ did not advance)
- Tuula Laaksalo
  - Qualification – 60.64m (→ did not advance)

Women's Heptathlon

- Satu Ruotsalainen
  - Final Result — 6101 points (→ 15th place)
- Ragne Kytölä
  - Final Result — 5686 points (→ 21st place)

== Cycling ==
Four cyclists, three men and one woman, represented Finland in 1988.

Men's road race

- Jari Lähde

Men's 1 km time trial

- Mika Hämäläinen

Men's individual pursuit

- Jyrki Tujunen

Women's road race

- Tea Vikstedt-Nyman — 2:00:52 (→ 43rd place)

== Diving ==
Men

Athlete	Event	Preliminary		Final	
Athlete	Event	Points	Rank	Points	Rank
Juha Ovaskainen	3 m springboard	500.76	22	Did not advance	

== Fencing ==
One male fencer represented Finland in 1988.

Men's épée

- Lars Winter

== Swimming ==
Men's 100m Breaststroke

- Petri Suominen
  1. Heat – 1:03.58
  2. B-Final – 1:04.04 (→ 14th place)

Men's 200m Breaststroke

- Petri Suominen
  1. Heat – 2:22.01 (→ did not advance, 29th place)
