= Naoyuki =

- Gender: Male

Origin
- Origin: Japanese
- Meaning: Different meanings depending on the kanji used

Naoyuki (written: 直之, 直行, 直幸, 尚幸, 尚之, 尚志, 尚往 or なおゆき in hiragana) is a masculine Japanese given name. Notable people with the name include:

- Naoyuki Agawa (阿川 尚之; born 1951), Japanese lawyer, diplomat, academic and writer
- Ban Naoyuki (塙 直之; 1567–1615), Japanese samurai
- Naoyuki Daigo (醍醐 直幸; born 1981), Japanese high jumper
- Naoyuki Fujita (藤田 直之; born 1987), Japanese footballer
- Naoyuki Ii (伊井 直行; born 1953), Japanese writer
- Naoyuki Itō (伊藤 尚往), Japanese anime director
- Naoyuki Kageyama (影山 なおゆき), Japanese manga artist
- Naoyuki Kato (加藤 直之; born 1952), Japanese illustrator
- Naoyuki Kinoshita (木下 直之; born 1954), Japanese art historian
- Naoyuki Kotani (小谷 直之; born 1981), Japanese mixed martial artist
- Nabeshima Naoyuki (鍋島 直之; 1643–1725), Japanese daimyō
- Nagai Naoyuki (永井 尚志; 1816–1896), Japanese samurai and politician
- Naoyuki Ogawa (小川 直之; born 1954), Japanese sailor
- Naoyuki Ohmura (大村 直之; born 1976), Japanese baseball player
- Naoyuki Ōi (大井 直幸; born 1983), Japanese pool player
- Naoyuki Shimizu (清水 直行; born 1975), Japanese baseball player
- Naoyuki Tomomatsu (友松 直之; born 1967), Japanese film director and screenwriter
- Naoyuki Uwasawa (上沢 直之; born 1994), Japanese baseball player
- Naoyuki Yamada (山田 尚幸; born 1987), Japanese footballer
- Naoyuki Yamazaki (山崎 直之; born 1991), Japanese footballer
