= Chillida =

Chillida is a Spanish surname that may refer to the following notable people:

- Eduardo Chillida (1924–2002), Spanish Basque sculptor
- Gonzalo Álvarez Chillida (born 1958), Spanish historian
- José Corbató Chillida (1862–1913), Spanish Roman Catholic priest
- Miguel Chillida (born 1963), Spanish water polo player
