= Tommy Nielsen =

Tommy Nielsen may refer to:

- Tommy Nielsen (cyclist) (born 1967), Danish cyclist
- Tommy Møller Nielsen (1961–2023), Danish football coach and player
- Tommy Nielsen (footballer, born 1972), Danish footballer

== See also ==
- Thomas Nielsen (born 1974), Danish cricketer
- Tom Nielsen, Danish curler
