= Peter Clausen =

Peter Clausen or Claussen may refer to:

- Peter Clausen (cyclist) (born 1964), Danish cyclist who competed at the 1988 Summer Olympics
- Peter Clausen (naturalist), Danish natural history collector
- Peter H. Claussen (1894–1990), American politician from Nebraska
