= Ortego =

Ortego is a surname. Notable people with the surname include:

- Artie Ortego (1890–1960), American film actor
- Keith Ortego (born 1963), American football player
- Miguel Ortego (born 1964), Spanish field hockey player
- Leo Ortego (1895–1947), American helicopter designer
- Stephen Ortego (born 1984), American politician

== See also ==
- Ortega
