= Sim Gyu-hae =

South Korean sailor

Personal information
- Nationality: South Korean
- Born: 1 February 1965 (age 60)
- Height: 182 cm (6 ft 0 in)
- Weight: 77 kg (170 lb)

Sport
- Sport: Sailing

Sim Gyu-hae (Korean: 심규해, also known as Shim Kyu-hae, born 1 February 1965) is a South Korean former sailor. He competed in the Tornado event at the 1988 Summer Olympics.
