= Christian Claus =

Austrian sailor

Personal information
- Nationality: Austrian
- Born: 2 May 1960 (age 64); Grebenstein, Germany

Sport
- Sport: Sailing

Christian Claus (born 2 May 1960) is an Austrian sailor. He competed in the Tornado event at the 1988 Summer Olympics.
