= Craig Schommer =

American cyclist

Personal information
- Born: October 29, 1966 (age 59) Oakland, California, United States

Cycling career
- Sport: Cycling

Craig Schommer (born October 29, 1966) is an American former cyclist. He competed in the road race at the 1988 Summer Olympics.
