= Kazuaki Sasaki =

Japanese cyclist

Personal information
- Born: 17 July 1967 (age 59) Hanamaki, Japan

Cycling career
- Sport: Cycling

Kazuaki Sasaki (佐々木 一昭, Sasaki Kazuaki; born 17 July 1967) is a Japanese former cyclist. He competed in the team pursuit event at the 1988 Summer Olympics. He later became a professional keirin cyclist with over 200 wins.
