= Raymond Cattin =

Swiss sailor

Personal information
- Nationality: Swiss
- Born: 23 July 1952 (age 72)

Sport
- Sport: Sailing

Raymond Cattin (born 23 July 1952) is a Swiss sailor. He competed in the Tornado event at the 1988 Summer Olympics.
