= Mohamed Mir =

Algerian cyclist

Personal information
- Born: 24 August 1963 (age 63)

Cycling career
- Sport: Cycling

Mohamed Mir (born 24 August 1963) is an Algerian former cyclist. He competed in the road race at the 1988 Summer Olympics.
