= Karl Strandman =

Swedish sailor

Personal information
- Nationality: Swedish
- Born: 9 April 1961 (age 63); Västerås, Sweden

Sport
- Sport: Sailing

Karl Strandman (born 9 April 1961) is a Swedish sailor. He competed in the Tornado event at the 1988 Summer Olympics.
