= Marcel Stäuble =

Swiss cyclist

Personal information
- Born: 23 April 1961 (age 65)

Cycling career
- Sport: Cycling

Marcel Stäuble (born 23 April 1961) is a Swiss former cyclist. He competed in the road race at the 1988 Summer Olympics.
