= Marian Turowski =

Polish cyclist

Personal information
- Born: 27 December 1964 (age 61) Sobótka, Poland

Cycling career
- Sport: Cycling

Marian Turowski (born 27 December 1964) is a Polish former cyclist. He competed in the team pursuit event at the 1988 Summer Olympics.
