= Park Byeong-gi =

South Korean sailor

Personal information
- Nationality: South Korean
- Born: 22 February 1963 (age 62)
- Height: 175 cm (5 ft 9 in)
- Weight: 68 kg (150 lb)

Sport
- Sport: Sailing

Park Byeong-gi (Korean: 박병기, also known as Park Byeong-ki or Park Byung-ki, born 22 February 1963) is a South Korean former sailor. He competed in the Tornado event at the 1988 Summer Olympics.
