= Do Eun-chul =

South Korean cyclist (born 1963)

Personal information
- Born: 24 March 1963 (age 63)

Cycling career
- Sport: Cycling

Do Eun-chul (born 24 March 1963) is a South Korean former cyclist. He competed in the points race at the 1988 Summer Olympics.
