= Sergio Llamazares =

Argentine cyclist

Personal information
- Born: 16 June 1965 (age 61)

Cycling career
- Sport: Cycling

Sergio Llamazares (born 16 June 1965) is an Argentine former cyclist. He competed in the team pursuit event at the 1988 Summer Olympics.
