= Mark Gornall =

British cyclist

Personal information
- Born: 25 October 1961 (age 64) Preston, Lancashire, England

Cycling career
- Sport: Cycling

Mark Gornall (born 25 October 1961) is a British former cyclist. He competed in the road race at the 1988 Summer Olympics.
