= Zbyněk Fiala =

Czech cyclist

Personal information
- Born: 12 July 1964 (age 62) Louny, Czechoslovakia

Cycling career
- Sport: Cycling

Zbyněk Fiala (born 12 July 1964) is a Czech former cyclist. He competed in the team pursuit event at the 1988 Summer Olympics.
