= Luděk Štyks =

Czech cyclist

Personal information
- Born: 30 June 1961 (age 65) Litoměřice, Czechoslovakia

Cycling career
- Sport: Cycling

Luděk Štyks (born 30 June 1961) is a Czech former cyclist. He competed in the road race at the 1988 Summer Olympics.
