= Kurt Schmied (cyclist) =

Austrian cyclist

Personal information
- Born: 3 September 1965 (age 61)

Cycling career
- Sport: Cycling

Kurt Schmied (born 3 September 1965) is an Austrian former cyclist. He competed in the team pursuit event at the 1988 Summer Olympics.
