= Robert Burns (cyclist) =

Australian cyclist (born 1968)

Personal information
- Born: 17 January 1968 (age 58)

Cycling career
- Sport: Cycling
Medal record
Track cycling
Representing Australia
Commonwealth Games
Gold medal – first place	1990 Auckland	Men's Points Race

Robert Burns (born 17 January 1968) is an Australian former cyclist. He competed in the points race at the 1988 Summer Olympics.
