= Bradley Schafferius =

Australian sailor

Personal information
- Nationality: Australian
- Born: 4 September 1960 (age 64)

Sport
- Sport: Sailing

Bradley Schafferius (born 4 September 1960) is an Australian sailor. He competed in the Tornado event at the 1988 Summer Olympics.
