= Geir Dahlen =

Norwegian cyclist

Personal information
- Born: 27 June 1960 Tønsberg, Norway
- Died: 10 May 2024 (aged 63)

Cycling career
- Sport: Cycling

Geir Dahlen (27 June 1960 – 10 May 2024) was a Norwegian cyclist. He competed in the road race at the 1988 Summer Olympics.
