= Didier Pasgrimaud =

French cyclist (1966–2021)

Personal information
- Born: 23 February 1966 Châteaubriant, France
- Died: 28 January 2021 (aged 54) Châteaubriant, France

Cycling career
- Sport: Cycling

Didier Pasgrimaud (23 February 1966 – 28 January 2021) was a French cyclist. He competed in the team pursuit event at the 1988 Summer Olympics.
