= Raoul Fahlin =

Swedish cyclist

Personal information
- Born: 13 October 1966 (age 60) Örebro, Sweden

Cycling career
- Sport: Cycling

Raoul Fahlin (born 13 October 1966) is a Swedish former cyclist. He competed in the road race at the 1988 Summer Olympics.
