= Raymond Thomas (cyclist) =

Jamaican cyclist

Personal information
- Born: 27 October 1968 (age 57)

Cycling career
- Sport: Cycling

Raymond Thomas (born 27 October 1968) is a Jamaican former cyclist. He first competed in the road race at the 1988 Summer Olympics in Seoul.
