= Matthias Lange =

German cyclist

Personal information
- Born: 14 February 1963 (age 63) Beckedorf, West Germany

Cycling career
- Sport: Cycling

Matthias Lange (born 14 February 1963) is a German former cyclist. He competed in the team pursuit event at the 1988 Summer Olympics.
