= Erik Johan Sæbø =

Norwegian cyclist

Personal information
- Born: 14 December 1964 (age 61) Sandnes, Norway

Cycling career
- Sport: Cycling
- Role: Rider

Erik Johan Sæbø (born 14 December 1964) is a Norwegian former professional racing cyclist. He won the Norwegian National Road Race Championship in 1988. He also competed in the road race at the 1988 Summer Olympics.
