= Edgar Röthlisberger =

Swiss sailor

Personal information
- Nationality: Swiss
- Born: 8 July 1958 (age 66)

Sport
- Sport: Sailing

Edgar Röthlisberger (born 8 July 1958) is a Swiss sailor. He competed in the Tornado event at the 1988 Summer Olympics.
