= Hans Reiter (sailor) =

United States Virgin Islands sailor

Personal information
- Nationality: American Virgin Islander
- Born: December 20, 1944 (age 80)
- Height: 185 cm (6 ft 1 in)
- Weight: 88 kg (194 lb)

Sport
- Sport: Sailing

Hans Reiter (born December 20, 1944) is a sailor who represented the United States Virgin Islands. He competed in the Tornado event at the 1988 Summer Olympics.
