= Chow Tai Ming =

Hong Kong cyclist

Personal information
- Born: 19 February 1959 (age 67)

Cycling career
- Sport: Cycling

Chow Tai Ming (born 19 February 1959) is a Hong Kong former cyclist. He competed in the road race at the 1988 Summer Olympics.
