= Carsten Wolf =

East German racing cyclist

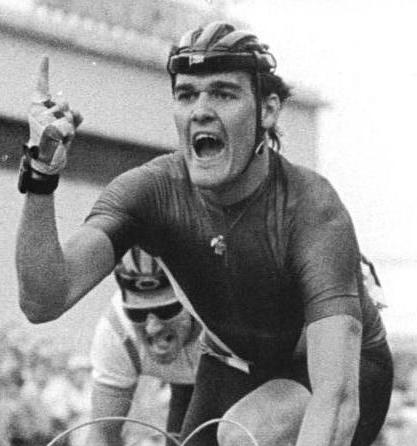
- Wolf in 1988

Personal information
- Born: 26 August 1964 (age 62) Potsdam, East Germany

Cycling career
- Sport: Cycling

Professional team
- 1991 to 1992: Team Telekom
Medal record
Men's cycling
Representing East Germany
Olympic Games
Silver medal – second place	1988 Seoul	4000 m Pursuit
World Championships
Gold medal – first place	1989 Chambéry	4000 m Pursuit

Carsten Wolf (born 26 August 1964) is an East German racing cyclist, who competed for the SC Dynamo Berlin / Sportvereinigung (SV) Dynamo. He won the silver medal at the Olympic games in Seoul 1988.

== Career ==
Wolf started cycling at an early age becoming the Individual pursuit World Junior Track Cycling Championships in 1982 at age 18. He also earned a silver medal in the Team pursuit during the same championships.

In 1983 he won his first victory on the road, the prologue of the Olympia's Tour.

In the 1988 Summer Olympics Wolf rode in the 4000m team pursuit. East Germany qualified as fourth fastest and after beating Australia in the playoffs they faced the Soviet Union in the final. They lost by less than one second to the Soviet Union.

Wolf spent two years at top level Team Telekom from 1991 to 1992. He ended up leaving the team as Wolf wanted to focus more on the Six Day Series.

== Major results ==
=== Track ===
1981
2nd Team pursuit World Junior Track Cycling Championships
1982
World Junior Track Cycling Championships

1st Individual pursuit
2nd Team pursuit

1983
2nd Team pursuit, World Amateur Track Cycling Championships
1987
2nd Team pursuit, World Amateur Track Cycling Championships
1988
2nd 4000m team pursuit Summer Olympic Games
1989
1st Team pursuit, World Amateur Track Cycling Championships

==== Six-Days Series ====
1994
1st Six Days of Zürich (with Urs Freuler)
1st Six Days of Köln
2nd Six Days of Munich (with Urs Freuler)
1996
1st Six Days of Bremen
1st Six Days of Stuttgart

=== Road ===
1983
3rd Overall Olympia's Tour

1st Prologue

1987
1st Stage 11 Olympia's Tour
1988
Niedersachsen Rundfahrt

1st Points classification
1st Stages 2, 8, 10 & 14

2nd Overall Olympia's Tour
1989
1st Overall Niedersachsen Rundfahrt

1st Points classification
1st Stages 5, 8, 9 & 11

1990
Niedersachsen Rundfahrt

1st Points classification
1st Stages 2, 4, 7, 11 & 12

1991
1st Stage 7 Tour of Sweden
1996
2nd Rund um Berlin
