= Roger Colman (sailor) =

Australian sailor

Personal information
- Nationality: Australian
- Born: 28 January 1951 (age 74)

Sport
- Sport: Sailing

Roger Colman (born 28 January 1951) is an Australian sailor. He competed in the Tornado event at the 1988 Summer Olympics.
