= Takashi Tamura =

Japanese sailor

Personal information
- Nationality: Japanese
- Born: 24 September 1961 (age 63)

Sport
- Sport: Sailing

Takashi Tamura (田村 孝, Tamura Takashi, born 24 September 1961) is a Japanese sailor. He competed in the Tornado event at the 1988 Summer Olympics.
