= Kazuo Takikawa =

Japanese cyclist

Personal information
- Born: 4 May 1962 (age 64) Ishikawa, Japan

Cycling career
- Sport: Cycling

Kazuo Takikawa (滝川 一夫, born 4 May 1962) is a Japanese former cyclist. He competed in the team pursuit event at the 1988 Summer Olympics.
