= Rubén Priede =

Argentine cyclist

Personal information
- Born: 8 June 1966 (age 60)

Cycling career
- Sport: Cycling

Rubén Priede (born 8 June 1966) is an Argentine former cyclist. He competed in the team pursuit event at the 1988 Summer Olympics.
