= Sebti Benzine =

Algerian cyclist

Personal information
- Born: 30 April 1964 (age 62)

Cycling career
- Sport: Cycling

Irbeh Sebti Benzine (born 30 April 1964) is an Algerian former cyclist. He competed in the road race at the 1988 Summer Olympics.
