= Jorge Gaday =

Argentine cyclist

Personal information
- Born: 19 February 1968 (age 58)

Cycling career
- Sport: Cycling

Jorge Gaday (born 19 February 1968) is an Argentine former cyclist. He competed in the team pursuit event at the 1988 Summer Olympics.
