= Fernando García (sailor) =

Argentine sailor

Personal information
- Full name: Fernando García Guevara
- Nationality: Argentine
- Born: 2 July 1952 (age 72)
- Height: 175 cm (5 ft 9 in)
- Weight: 66 kg (146 lb)

Sport
- Sport: Sailing

Fernando García Guevara (Note: In this Spanish name, the first or paternal surname is García and the second or maternal family name is Guevara.) (born 2 July 1952) is an Argentine sailor. He competed in the Tornado event at the 1988 Summer Olympics.
