= Mitsuhiro Suzuki =

Japanese cyclist

Personal information
- Born: 2 February 1963 (age 63) Furudono, Fukushima, Japan

Cycling career
- Sport: Cycling

Mitsuhiro Suzuki (鈴木 光広, Suzuki Mitsuhiro; born 2 February 1963) is a Japanese former cyclist. He competed in the road race at the 1988 Summer Olympics. He is currently general manager of the Bridgestone–Anchor cycling team.
