= David Brinton =

American cyclist (born 1967)

Personal information
- Full name: David John Brinton
- Born: January 17, 1967 (age 59) Covina, California, U.S.
- Height: 5 ft 8 1/2 in (174 cm)
- Weight: 143 lb (65 kg)

Cycling career
- Sport: Cycling

David Brinton (born January 17, 1967) is an American former cyclist. He competed in the individual pursuit event at the 1988 Summer Olympics.

== Career ==
During Brinton's cycling career he competed in seven World Championships, won gold and silver medals at the Pan American Games, set four national records and competed in the 1988 Olympic Games in Seoul. After his cycling career Brinton worked as a Hollywood Stuntman for 17 years, appearing in more than 120 films. He has recently began competing internationally earning four Master World Track Championship titles and setting three Master World Records in 2013–2015, also working as a cycling coach and motivational speaker.
