= Roman Čermák =

Czech cyclist

Personal information
- Born: 11 September 1959 (age 67) Prague, Czechoslovakia

Cycling career
- Sport: Cycling

Roman Čermák (born 11 September 1959) is a Czech former cyclist. He competed in the individual pursuit event at the 1988 Summer Olympics.
