= Hans-Jürgen Pfohe =

German sailor

Personal information
- Nationality: German
- Born: 23 September 1950 (age 74); Lüneburg, Germany

Sport
- Sport: Sailing

Hans-Jürgen Pfohe (born 23 September 1950) is a German former sailor. He competed in the Tornado event at the 1988 Summer Olympics. In 1987, along with Roland Gäbler, they were the German national champions in the event.
