= Gianpaolo Grisandi =

Italian cyclist (1964–2025)

Personal information
- Born: 4 December 1964 Ravenna, Italy
- Died: 29 January 2025 (aged 60)

Cycling career
- Sport: Cycling

Gianpaolo Grisandi (4 December 1964 – 29 January 2025) was an Italian cyclist. He competed in the team pursuit event at the 1988 Summer Olympics. Grisandi died on 29 January 2025, at the age of 60.
