= Uwe Nepp =

German cyclist

Personal information
- Born: 1 December 1966 (age 59) Krefeld, West Germany

Cycling career
- Sport: Cycling

Uwe Nepp (born 1 December 1966) is a German former cyclist. He competed in the team pursuit event at the 1988 Summer Olympics. Two years later, Nepp placed 21st at the 1990 Tour of Belgium.
