= Iraj Amirakhori =

Iranian cyclist

Personal information
- Born: 5 October 1962 (age 64)

Cycling career
- Sport: Cycling

Iraj Amirakhori (Persian: ایرج امیرآخوری, born 5 October 1962) is an Iranian former cyclist. He competed in the road race at the 1988 Summer Olympics.
