= Dave Lettieri =

American cyclist

Personal information
- Born: January 30, 1964 (age 62) Scranton, Pennsylvania, United States

Cycling career
- Sport: Cycling

Dave Lettieri (born January 30, 1964) is an American former cyclist. He competed in the team pursuit event at the 1988 Summer Olympics.

== Biography ==
Lettieri was born in Scranton, Pennsylvania in 1964, winning his first race in 1977, and his first national title at the age of 15. In 1980, Lettieri was the National Intermediate Boys Champion. Five years later, he was selected for the World Championship Team. Lettieri attended Scranton Preparatory School, before going on to study at Loyola Marymount University.

In 1987, at the American championships, he set a new national record in the team pursuit event. Later the same year, at the 1987 Pan American Games, Lettieri was part of the team that won the gold medal in the team pursuit. A year earlier, he rode at the 1986 Goodwill Games, and went on to ride in the team pursuit event at the 1988 Summer Olympics, finishing in ninth place in the latter.

After his track career, Lettieri worked as the team manager for the Chevrolet/LA Sheriff team from 1992 to 1996. Four years later, he was Lance Armstrong's mechanic at the 2000 Tour de France.

Following his time as a manager and mechanic, Lettieri opened his own bicycle shop in Santa Barbara, California.
