= Diego Minguens =

Argentine sailor

Personal information
- Nationality: Argentine
- Born: 25 January 1955 (age 70)

Sport
- Sport: Sailing

Diego Minguens (born 25 January 1955) is an Argentine sailor. He competed in the Tornado event at the 1988 Summer Olympics.
