= Xavier Isasa =

Spanish cyclist (born 1966)

Personal information
- Born: 2 June 1966 (age 60) Oiartzun, Spain

Cycling career
- Sport: Cycling

Xavier Isasa (born 2 June 1966) is a Spanish former cyclist. He competed in the team pursuit event at the 1988 Summer Olympics.
