= Pavel Tesař =

Czech cyclist

Personal information
- Born: 26 February 1967 (age 59) Prague, Czechoslovakia

Cycling career
- Sport: Cycling

Pavel Tesař (born 26 February 1967) is a Czech former cyclist. He competed at the 1988 Summer Olympics and the 1992 Summer Olympics.
