= Francisco García (sailor) =

Spanish sailor

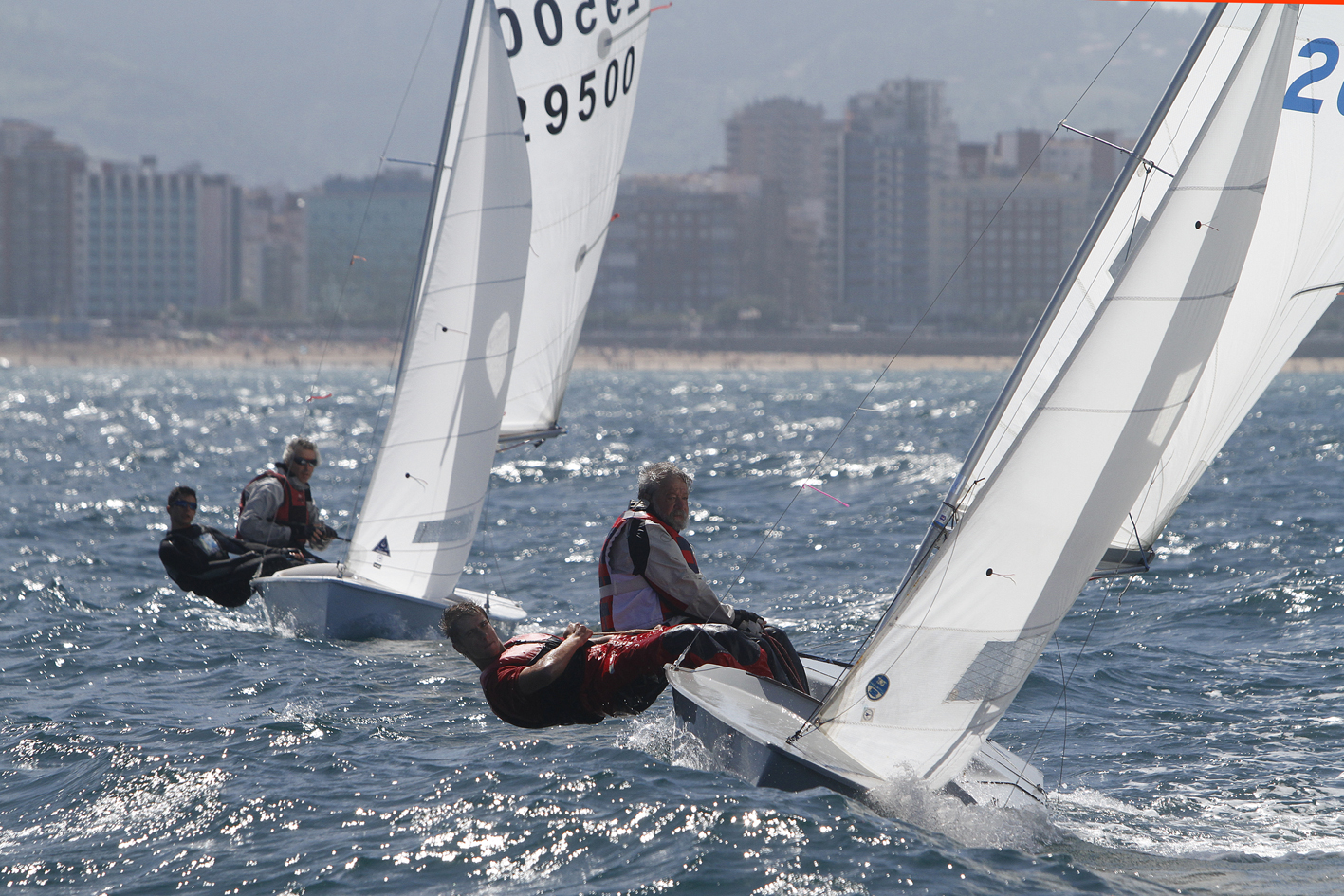

Personal information
- Full name: José Francisco García de Soto y de la Roza
- Nationality: Spanish
- Born: 23 June 1947 (age 77); Santander, Spain

Sport
- Sport: Sailing

José Francisco García de Soto (born 23 June 1947), known as Chiqui, is a Spanish sailor. He competed in the Tornado event at the 1988 Summer Olympics. He was runner-up at the Snipe European Championship in 1982, and national champion in the Tornado class in 1986 and 1988, and in the Star class in 2005.
