= Antonio Salvador (cyclist) =

Spanish cyclist

Personal information
- Born: 21 March 1968 (age 58) Madrid, Spain

Cycling career
- Sport: Cycling

Antonio Salvador (born 21 March 1968) is a Spanish former cyclist. He competed in the points race at the 1988 Summer Olympics.
