= Petri Suominen =

Finnish swimmer

Personal information
- Born: 30 April 1971 (age 55) Turku, Finland

Sport
- Sport: Swimming

Petri Suominen (born 30 April 1971) is a Finnish swimmer. He competed in at the 1988 Summer Olympics and the 1992 Summer Olympics.
