= Carl Erik Johannessen =

Norwegian sailor

Personal information
- Nationality: Norwegian
- Born: 16 May 1963 (age 61); Bergen

Sport
- Sport: Sailing

Carl Erik Johannessen (born 16 May 1963) is a Norwegian sailor, born in Bergen. He competed at the 1988 Summer Olympics in Seoul, in the multihull class together with Per Arne Nilsen, and the team finished sixth overall.
