= Agustín Sebastiá =

Spanish cyclist

Personal information
- Full name: Agustín Sebastiá Álvarez
- Born: 30 August 1964 (age 62) Valencia, Spain

Cycling career
- Sport: Cycling

Agustín Sebastiá Álvarez (Note: In this Spanish name, the first or paternal surname is Sebastiá and the second or maternal family name is Álvarez.) (born 30 August 1964) is a Spanish former cyclist. He competed in the team pursuit event at the 1988 Summer Olympics.
