= Hratch Zadourian =

Lebanese cyclist (born 1969)

Personal information
- Born: 25 March 1969 (age 57)

Cycling career
- Sport: Cycling

Hratch Zadourian (born 25 March 1969) is a Lebanese former racing cyclist who competed at the 1988 Summer Olympics.
