= Philippe Grivel =

Swiss cyclist

Personal information
- Born: 29 June 1964 (age 62)

Cycling career
- Sport: Cycling

Philippe Grivel (born 29 June 1964) is a Swiss former cyclist. He competed in the points race at the 1988 Summer Olympics.
