= Iván Alemany =

Spanish cyclist (born 1967)

Personal information
- Born: 30 April 1967 (age 59) Benifaió, Spain

Cycling career
- Sport: Cycling

Iván Alemany (born 30 April 1967) is a Spanish former cyclist. He competed in the road race at the 1988 Summer Olympics.
