= Naoyuki Ogawa =

Japanese sailor

Personal information
- Nationality: Japanese
- Born: 2 January 1954 (age 71)

Sport
- Sport: Sailing

Naoyuki Ogawa (小川 直之, Ogawa Naoyuki, born 2 January 1954) is a Japanese sailor. He competed in the Tornado event at the 1988 Summer Olympics.
