= José Asconeguy =

Uruguayan cyclist

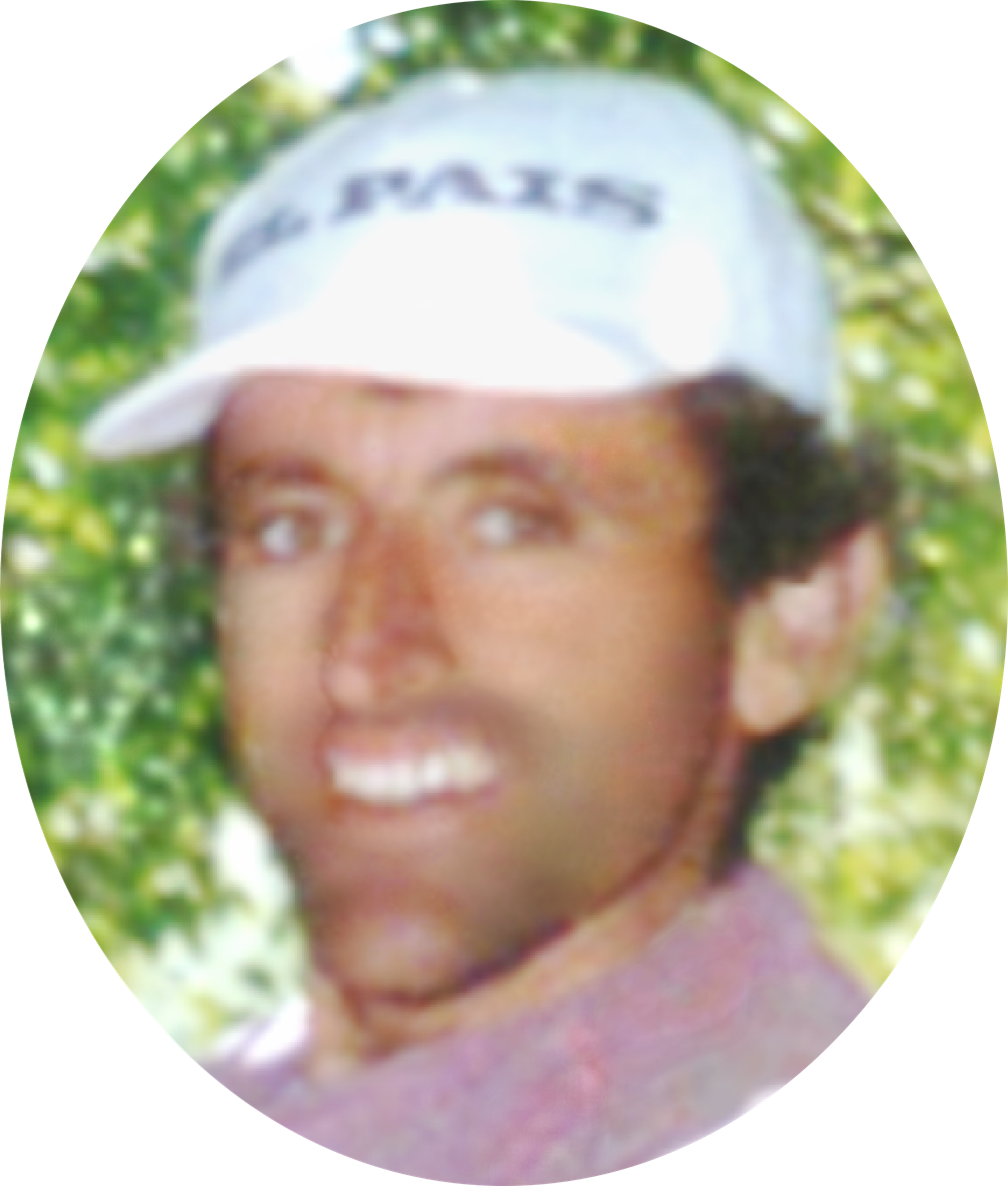

Personal information
- Born: 14 May 1963 (age 63) Trinidad, Uruguay

Cycling career
- Sport: Cycling

José Asconeguy (born 14 May 1963) is a Uruguayan former cyclist. He competed in the road race at the 1988 Summer Olympics.
