= Tommy Nielsen (cyclist) =

Danish cyclist

Personal information
- Born: 11 November 1967 (age 58) Hillerød, Denmark

Cycling career
- Sport: Cycling

Tommy Nielsen (born 11 November 1967) is a Danish former cyclist. He competed in the road race at the 1988 Summer Olympics.
