= Mario van Baarle =

Dutch cyclist

Personal information
- Born: 24 October 1965 Pijnacker, Netherlands
- Height: 187 cm (6 ft 2 in)
- Weight: 86 kg (190 lb)

Cycling career
- Sport: Cycling
- Discipline: Track cycling

Mario van Baarle (born 24 October 1965 in Pijnacker) is a track cyclist from the Netherlands. He competed in the men's team pursuit at the 1988 Summer Olympics, finishing 12th.

He is the father of Dutch professional cyclists Dylan van Baarle and Ashlynn van Baarle.

== See also ==
- List of Dutch Olympic cyclists
