= Peter Aldridge =

Jamaican cyclist (born 1961)

Peter Aldridge (born 2 January 1961) is a distinguished Jamaican cyclist and cycling coach with an accomplished international career spanning more than a decade at the elite level.

Aldridge represented Jamaica at three consecutive Olympic Games: the 1980 Summer Olympics, the 1984 Summer Olympics and the 1988 Summer Olympics . His strongest Olympic performance came in 1984, where he placed eleventh in the points race.

Throughout his competitive career, Aldridge represented Jamaica in numerous prestigious international events, including the Pan American Junior Cycling Championships (1977), the Central American and Caribbean Games (1977 and 1982), where he earned a gold medal, and the Spartakiad in Moscow (1979).

In 1982, he achieved significant success, winning the Budweiser Classic, claiming overall victory at the Tour of Jamaica, and finishing third overall in the Tour de la República Dominicana. That same year, he competed at the UCI Track Cycling World Championships 1982 and the 1982 Commonwealth Games.

His international podium finishes continued with a bronze medal at the 1983 Pan American Games, along with strong performances at the Trinidad International (1984) and the Pan American Cycling Championships, where he placed fourth.

Many of Aldridge’s records remain unbroken, including the Central American and Caribbean 10-mile Individual Time Trial record of 20 minutes and the Blue Mountain 6-mile Time Trial record of 19 minutes, 11 seconds.

Beyond competition, Aldridge has made a lasting impact on cycling development in Jamaica. He has hosted the Ted Gray Memorial Cycling Classic and founded the Peter Aldridge 2-Day Cycling Classic, first held in April 2024 and again in 2025. These events promote participation across all ages, genders, and skill levels, with particular emphasis on youth development.

Aldridge has been involved in mentoring cyclists and has coached Khalil Francis for several years. He also organizes road and gravel training rides and participates in the development of athletes in both coaching and support roles.
