= Amir Eftekhari =

Iranian football midfielder

Ali Eftekhari
Personal information
- Full name: Seyed Ali Eftekhari
- Date of birth: July 29, 1964 (age 62)
- Place of birth: Rasht, Iran
- Position: Midfielder

Senior career*
Years	Team	Apps	(Gls)
1979–1980	Sepidrood Rasht		
1980–1981	Iranmehr Rasht		
1984–1990	Esteghlal Rasht		
1990–1991	Esteghlal Tehran		
1991–1993	Keshavarz		
1993–1995	Saipa		
1995–1996	Persepolis		
1996–1997	Saipa		
1998	Balestier Central		
1999–2001	Bargh Tehran		
2001–2002	Homa Tehran		

International career
1988–1992	Iran	8	(0)
- * Club domestic league appearances and goals

Seyed Ali "Amir" Eftekhari (Persian: سید علی افتخاری) is an Iranian football midfielder who played for Iran in the 1988 Asian Cup.

"Amir" scored a magistral goal against China during the 1990 World Cup qualifiers, last game of First round - Group 5 on July 24, 1989. Before this decisive match, R.P. China lead the pool with 10 points and a large goals difference: 11/0 ! Playing at home, Iran (8 points and 9/3 goals) must win with at least three goals wide. "Team Melli" escaped at "3-0" on 53rd minute, but Chinese team came back to "3-2" and clinch the group win on goals difference (11/3 against 12/5).

== Honours ==
- AFC Asian Cup (third place): 1988
