= Brian Talma =

Barbadian windsurfer

Personal information
- Full name: Brian Herbert Hamilton Talma
- Nationality: Barbadian
- Born: 24 March 1965 (age 60)

Sport
- Sport: Windsurfing

Brian Herbert Hamilton Talma (born 24 March 1965) is a Barbadian windsurfer. He grew up with dyslexia, and attended The Gow School for his high school years. He competed at the 1988 Summer Olympics and the 1992 Summer Olympics.
