= Gonzalo Aguiar =

Spanish cyclist (born 1966)

Personal information
- Full name: Gonzalo Aguiar Martínez
- Born: 11 April 1966 (age 60) Galicia, Spain
- Height: 175 cm (5 ft 9 in)
- Weight: 62 kg (137 lb)

Cycling career
- Sport: Cycling

Gonzalo Aguiar Martínez (born 11 April 1966) is a Spanish former cyclist. He competed in the road race at the 1988 Summer Olympics.
