= José Luis Ballester (swimmer) =

Spanish swimmer

Personal information
- Full name: José Luis Ballester Rubert
- National team: Spain
- Born: August 6, 1969 (age 56) Castellón de la Plana, Castellón
- Height: 1.76 m (5 ft 9 in)
- Weight: 70 kg (154 lb)

Sport
- Sport: Swimming
- Strokes: Butterfly
- Club: Club Náutico Castaglia, Castellón
- College team: University of Florida

José Luis Ballester Rubert (born August 17, 1969) is a former butterfly swimmer from Spain, who competed at three consecutive Summer Olympics for his native country, starting in 1988. At each Olympic appearance he was eliminated in the qualifying heats.

Ballester was born in Vinaròs, Castellón, Spain.

Ballester received an athletic scholarship to attend the University of Florida in Gainesville, Florida, where he swam for the Florida Gators swimming and diving team in National Collegiate Athletic Association (NCAA) competition. He graduated from the University of Florida with a bachelor's degree in management in 2003.

== See also ==
- List of University of Florida alumni
- List of University of Florida Olympians
