= Marinus Reniers =

Dutch archer (born 1947)

Personal information
- Nationality: Dutch
- Born: 5 August 1947 (age 77); Eindhoven, Netherlands

Sport
- Sport: Archery

Marinus Reniers (born 5 August 1947) is a Dutch archer. He competed at the 1980 Summer Olympics, the 1984 Summer Olympics and the 1988 Summer Olympics.
