= Eduardo Manrique =

Spanish cyclist

Personal information
- Born: 19 April 1965 (age 61) Valladolid, Spain

Cycling career
- Sport: Cycling

Eduardo Manrique (born 19 April 1965) is a Spanish former cyclist. He competed in the road race at the 1988 Summer Olympics.
