= Gianni Vignaduzzi =

Canadian cyclist

Personal information
- Born: 27 August 1966 (age 60) Montreal, Quebec, Canada

Cycling career
- Sport: Cycling

Gianni Vignaduzzi (born 27 August 1966) is a retired track cyclist from Canada who represented his country at the 1988 Summer Olympics in Seoul, South Korea, where he finished in 17th place in the Men's Points Race and at the 1992 Summer Olympics in Barcelona, where he finished in 26th position in the Men's Individual Road Race.
