= Fabrizio Trezzi =

Italian cyclist

Personal information
- Born: 7 July 1967 (age 59) Milan, Italy

Cycling career
- Sport: Cycling

Fabrizio Trezzi (born 7 July 1967) is an Italian former cyclist. He competed at the 1988 Summer Olympics and the 1992 Summer Olympics.
