= Patrick Dybiona =

Dutch swimmer (born 1963)

Medal record

Men's Swimming

Representing Netherlands

European Championships (LC)
Bronze medal – third place	1985 Sofia	4×200 m freestyle

Summer Universiade
Silver medal – second place	1987 Zagreb	100 m freestyle

Patrick Stefan Bernard Dybiona (born 12 September 1963 in Brunssum, Limburg) is a former freestyle swimmer from the Netherlands, who competed for his native country at the 1988 Summer Olympics in Seoul, South Korea.

There he finished in seventh place (3:46.55) with the Dutch 4 × 100 m medley relay team, alongside Hans Kroes (backstroke), Ron Dekker (breaststroke), and Frank Drost (butterfly). On his two personal starts, in the 100 m and 200 m freestyle, he ended up in 30th (51.79) and in 34th (1:52.67) position.
