= Howard Palmer (sailor) =

Barbadian sailor

Personal information
- Nationality: Barbadian
- Born: 23 September 1946 (age 78)

Sport
- Sport: Sailing

Howard Palmer (born 23 September 1946) is a Barbadian sailor. He competed at the 1984 Summer Olympics and the 1988 Summer Olympics.
