= Per Arne Nilsen =

Norwegian sailor

Personal information
- Nationality: Norwegian
- Born: 30 March 1961 (age 64); Mandal, Norway

Sport
- Sport: Sailing

Per Arne Nilsen (born 30 March 1961) is a Norwegian sailor. He was born in Mandal, Norway.

He participated at the 1984 Summer Olympics in Los Angeles, where he placed 21st in the dinghy class. At the 1988 Summer Olympics in Seoul he competed in the multihull class together with Carl Erik Johannessen, and the team finished sixth overall.
