= Christopher Honey =

Barbadian diver

Personal information
- Nationality: Barbadian
- Born: 10 November 1961 (age 63)

Sport
- Sport: Diving

Christopher Honey (born 10 November 1961) is a Barbadian diver. He competed in the men's 3 metre springboard event at the 1988 Summer Olympics, during his time at University of Toronto, finishing in 33rd place.
