= Paul Yelle =

Barbadian swimmer (born 1964)

Personal information
- Born: 22 February 1964 (age 62)

Sport
- Sport: Swimming

Paul Yelle (born 22 February 1964) is a Barbadian swimmer. He competed in three events at the 1988 Summer Olympics.
