= Jyrki Tujunen =

Finnish cyclist

Personal information
- Born: 20 November 1968 (age 57) Helsinki, Finland

Cycling career
- Sport: Cycling

Jyrki Tujunen (born 20 November 1968) is a Finnish former cyclist. He competed in the individual pursuit event at the 1988 Summer Olympics.
