= Óscar Mercado (sailor) =

Puerto Rican sailor (born 1963)

Personal information
- Nationality: Puerto Rican
- Born: 16 November 1963 (age 62)

Sport
- Sport: Sailing

Óscar Mercado (born 16 November 1963) is a Puerto Rican sailor. He competed at the 1988 Summer Olympics and the 1992 Summer Olympics.
