= Dan Frost (cyclist) =

Danish cyclist (born 1961)

Personal information
- Full name: Dan Frost
- Born: 22 May 1961 (age 65) Frederiksberg, Denmark

Cycling career
- Sport: Cycling
- Discipline: Track
- Role: Rider
- Rider type: Endurance
Medal record
Men's track cycling
Representing Denmark
Olympic Games
Gold medal – first place	1988 Seoul	Points race

Dan Frost (born 22 May 1961) is a retired male track cyclist from Denmark, who won the gold medal for his native country in the men's points race at the 1988 Summer Olympics in Seoul, South Korea. His other major victories include the world title in the same event in 1986 (Colorado Springs). He is the brother of cyclist Ken Frost. After retiring from racing, he worked in management for Bjarne Riis's Team CSC for nine seasons before joining Team Sky as a directeur sportif for 2014. Eventually, he left competitive cycling to organise bike trips and work with the Amaury Sport Organisation, the organisers of the Tour de France.
