= Santiago Grau =

Spanish field hockey player (born 1963)

Santiago Grau (born 2 August 1963) is a Spanish former field hockey player who competed in the 1988 Summer Olympics and in the 1992 Summer Olympics.
