= Luis López (sailor) =

Spanish sailor

Personal information
- Nationality: Spanish
- Born: 8 March 1955 (age 70); Santander, Spain

Sport
- Sport: Sailing

Luis López (born 8 March 1955) is a Spanish sailor. He competed in the Tornado event at the 1988 Summer Olympics.
