= Michael Green (sailor) =

Barbadian sailor

Personal information
- Nationality: Barbadian
- Born: 4 June 1954 (age 70); Dublin, Ireland

Sport
- Sport: Sailing

Michael Green (born 4 June 1954) is a Barbadian sailor. He competed at the 1988 Summer Olympics and the 1996 Summer Olympics, representing Barbados and Saint Lucia respectively.
