= Erik Cent =

Dutch cyclist

Personal information
- Born: 29 March 1962 Goor, Netherlands
- Height: 187 cm (6 ft 2 in)
- Weight: 78 kg (172 lb)

Cycling career
- Sport: Cycling
- Discipline: Track cycling

Gerhardus Engelbertus "Erik" Cent (born 29 March 1962 in Goor) is a track cyclist from the Netherlands. He competed in the men's team pursuit and men's individual pursuit at the 1988 Summer Olympics and in the men's team pursuit at the 1992 Summer Olympics.

== See also ==
- List of Dutch Olympic cyclists
