= James Waithe =

Barbadian judoka

- Born: 30 December 1961 (age 64)

James Waithe (born 30 December 1961) is a former judoka who represented Barbados at the 1988 Summer Olympics, and England at the 2006 Commonwealth Judo Championships. He was sensei at the University of Bristol Judo club 2001.

In November 2009, Waithe was convicted of drugs offences in Bristol, England. He was reportedly the enforcer and debt collector for drug lord Craig Rodel, whose gang turned in over £50 million a year from trafficking cocaine, MDMA, heroin and firearms. In one incident Waithe and an associate tied a man to a chair, beat him with nunchuks, stuck a cigarette in his ear and put his hands in a toaster. Police were alerted to the gang's operations after a burglary was called into a flat owned by Waithe, where police discovered an 'industrial-scale' cocaine factory.
