= Marat Ganeyev =

Russian cyclist

Personal information
- Full name: Marat Ganeyev
- Born: 6 December 1964 (age 61) Naberezhnye Chelny, Russian SFSR, Soviet Union

Cycling career
- Sport: Cycling
- Discipline: Track
- Role: Rider
Medal record
Men's track cycling
Representing Soviet Union
Olympic Games
Bronze medal – third place	1988 Seoul	Points Race

Marat Ganeyev (born 6 December 1964) is a retired track cyclist from Russia, who won the bronze medal for the Soviet Union in the men's points race at the 1988 Summer Olympics in Seoul, South Korea. He was a professional road cyclist from 1989 to 1998.

== Major results ==
1983
1st Prologue Tour Européen Lorraine-Alsace
1984
2nd Overall International Tour of Hellas
1985
1st Overall Tour du Maroc
2nd Overall International Tour of Hellas
1986
1st Stage 8 Olympia's Tour
1995
3rd Nationale Sluitingprijs - Putte - Kapellen
