= Alcides Etcheverry =

Uruguayan cyclist (born 1961)

Alcides Etcheverry (born 4 September 1961) is a Uruguayan former cyclist. He competed in the road race at the 1988 Summer Olympics.
