= Miklós Somogyi =

Hungarian cyclist

Personal information
- Born: 19 August 1962 (age 64) Budapest, Hungary

Cycling career
- Sport: Cycling

Miklós Somogyi (born 19 August 1962) is a Hungarian former cyclist. He competed at the 1988 Summer Olympics and the 1992 Summer Olympics.
