= Jalil Eftekhari =

Iranian cyclist

Personal information
- Born: 29 March 1965 (age 61)

Cycling career
- Sport: Cycling

Jalil Eftekhari (Persian: جلیل افتخاری, born 29 March 1965) is an Iranian former cyclist. He competed in two events at the 1988 Summer Olympics.
