= Roderick Chase =

Barbadian cyclist (1967–2025)

Personal information
- Born: 12 October 1967
- Died: 15 December 2025 (aged 58)

Cycling career
- Sport: Cycling

Roderick Chase (12 October 1967 – 15 December 2025) was a Barbadian cyclist. He competed in two events at the 1988 Summer Olympics. Chase died on the morning of 15 December 2025, at the age of 58.
