= Hsu Jui-te =

Taiwanese cyclist (born 1964)

Personal information
- Full name: 徐 瑞德, 大甲高中自由車隊教練 Pinyin: Xú Ruì-dé
- Born: 10 October 1964 (age 62)

Cycling career
- Sport: Cycling

Hsu Jui-te (born 10 October 1964) is a Taiwanese former cyclist. He competed in two events at the 1988 Summer Olympics.
