= Miguel Ortego =

Spanish field hockey player (born 1964)

Personal information
- Full name: Miguel Ortego Fernández
- Born: 19 July 1964 (age 61); Madrid, Spain

Miguel Ortego Fernández (Note: In this Spanish name, the first or paternal surname is Ortego and the second or maternal family name is Fernández.) (born 19 July 1964 in Madrid) is a Spanish former field hockey player who competed in the 1988 Summer Olympics and in the 1992 Summer Olympics.
