= Thomas Dürst =

German cyclist

Personal information
- Born: 22 June 1967 (age 59) Munich, West Germany

Cycling career
- Sport: Cycling

Thomas Dürst (born 22 June 1967) is a former German cyclist. He competed in two events at the 1988 Summer Olympics.
