= Leo Peelen =

Dutch cyclist (1968–2017)

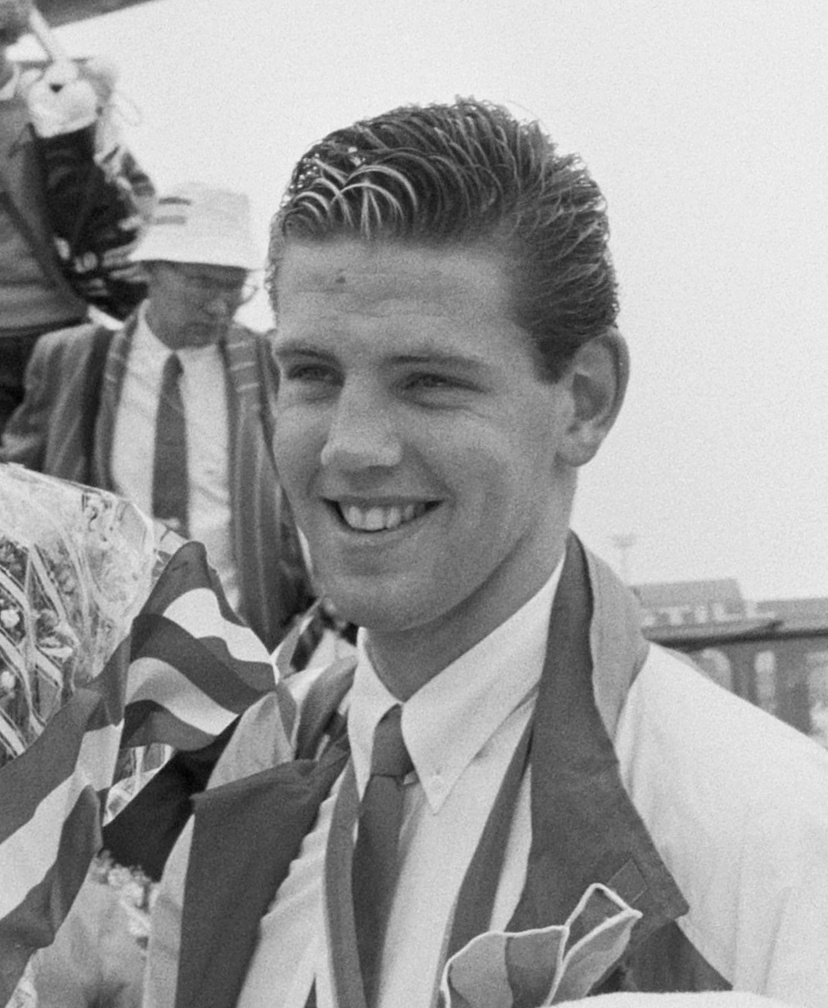
- Leo Peelen in 1988

Personal information
- Born: 16 July 1968 Arnhem, Netherlands
- Died: 24 March 2017 (aged 48) Apeldoorn, the Netherlands
- Height: 1.95 m (6 ft 5 in)
- Weight: 85 kg (187 lb)

Sport
- Sport: Track cycling
Medal record
Representing the Netherlands
Olympic Games
Silver medal – second place	1988 Seoul	Points Race

Leopoldus Eduardus Theoduris "Leo" Peelen (16 July 1968 – 24 March 2017) was a Dutch track cyclist. He won the silver medal at the 1988 Summer Olympics in Seoul in the points race. The following year, he captured a bronze medal at the 1989 World Championships. Peelen became six times Dutch champion on the track (Pointsrace in 1983, 1984, 1985 (winter), Individual Pursuit 1986 and Madison 1987 and 1988).

He was the chairman of the organization of the yearly time trial and cycling festival in Beek. He was one of the 66 riders who participated in the first Alpe d'HuZes when he climbed the Alpe d'Huez six times on 6 June 2006. They fundraised €400,000 for the Dutch Cancer Society during that event.

On 24 March 2017, Peelen died unexpectedly at the age of 48.

== See also ==
- List of Dutch Olympic cyclists
