= Ryszard Dawidowicz =

Polish cyclist (born 1960)

Personal information
- Born: 11 June 1960 (age 66) Stare Czarnowo, Poland

Cycling career
- Sport: Cycling

Ryszard Dawidowicz (born 11 June 1960) is a Polish former cyclist. He competed in two events at the 1988 Summer Olympics.
