= Miguel Chillida =

Spanish water polo player (born 1963)

Personal information
- Nationality: Spanish
- Born: 11 July 1963 (age 61)

Sport
- Sport: Water polo

Miguel Chillida (born 11 July 1963) is a Spanish water polo player. He competed in the men's tournament at the 1988 Summer Olympics.
