= Fernando Louro (cyclist) =

Brazilian cyclist

Personal information
- Born: 18 June 1962 (age 64)

Cycling career
- Sport: Cycling

Fernando Louro (born 18 June 1962) is a Brazilian former cyclist. He competed at the 1980, 1988 and 1992 Summer Olympics.
