= José Antonio Martiarena =

Spanish cyclist

Personal information
- Born: 14 January 1968 (age 58) San Sebastián, Spain

Cycling career
- Sport: Cycling

José Antonio Martiarena (born 14 January 1968) is a Spanish former track cyclist. He competed in two events at the 1988 Summer Olympics.
