= Hans Kroes =

Dutch swimmer (born 1965)

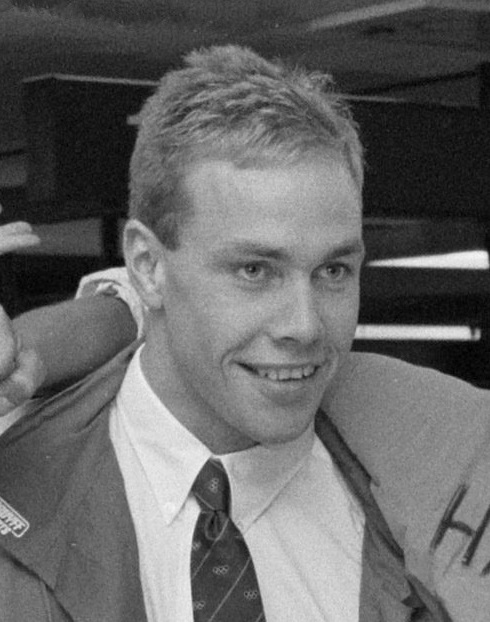
- Hans Kroes in 1988

Personal information
- Born: 3 June 1965 (age 61)
Medal record
Men's Swimming
Representing the Netherlands
European Championships (LC)
Bronze medal – third place	1985 Sofia	4×200 m freestyle
Summer Universiade
Silver medal – second place	1987 Zagreb	50 m freestyle
Bronze medal – third place	1987 Zagreb	100 m freestyle

Hans Kroes (born 3 June 1965 in Lisse, South Holland) is a former freestyle and backstroke swimmer from The Netherlands, who competed for his native country at two consecutive Summer Olympics, starting in 1984. His best individual result in Los Angeles, California was the eighth place in the 100 m backstroke (58.07).
