= Peter Clausen (cyclist) =

Danish cyclist

Personal information
- Born: 13 April 1964 (age 62) Rødovre, Denmark

Cycling career
- Sport: Cycling

Peter Clausen (born 13 April 1964) is a Danish former cyclist. He competed in two events at the 1988 Summer Olympics.
