= Cycling at the 1990 Commonwealth Games =

- Venue: Track: Manukau Velodrome; Road TTT: Auckland Southern Motorway; Road race:Blockhouse Bay, Green Bay, Lower Titirangi, Avondale
- Location: Auckland, New Zealand
- Dates: 24 January – 3 February 1990

Cycling at the 1990 Commonwealth Games was the 13th appearance of Cycling at the Commonwealth Games. The events were held in Auckland, New Zealand, from 24 January – 3 February 1990.

The track events were held at the Manukau Velodrome in Clover Park.

The road team time trial centered around the Auckland Southern Motorway, while the road race consisted of a circuit taking in Blockhouse Bay, Green Bay, Lower Titirangi and Avondale.

New Zealand topped the cycling medal table, by virtue of winning six gold medals.

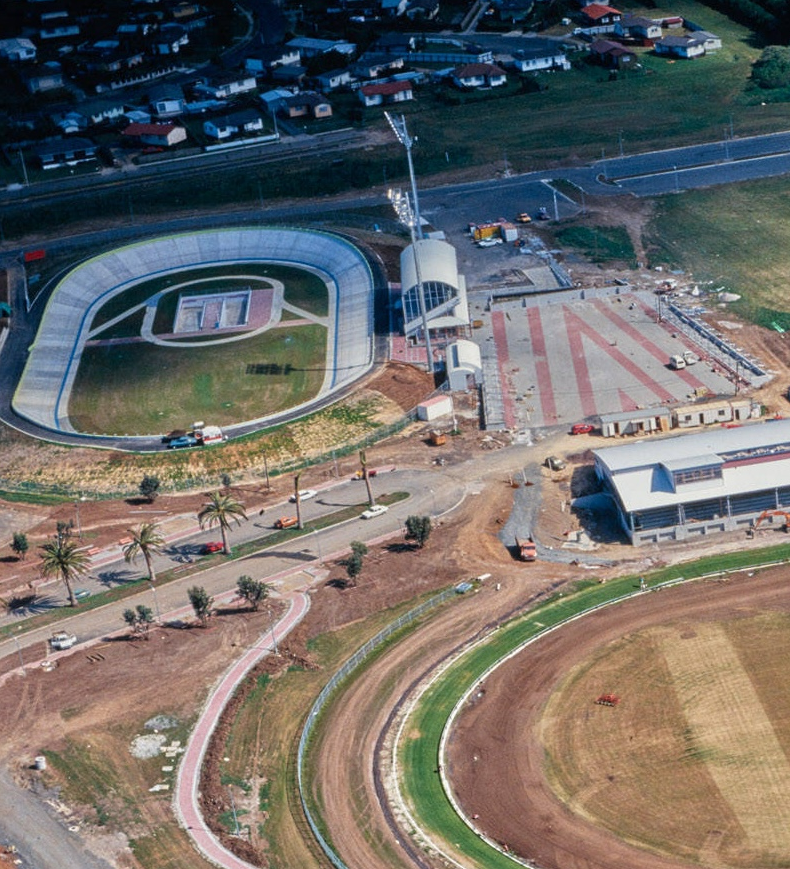
Manukau Velodrome, circa 1989 Auckland Libraries Heritage Collections

== Medal table ==
* Host nation (New Zealand)

Rank	Nation	Gold	Silver	Bronze	Total
1	New Zealand*	6	3	3	12
2	Australia	4	5	3	12
3	Wales	1	0	0	1
4	Canada	0	2	2	4
5	England	0	1	2	3
6	Northern Ireland	0	0	1	1
Totals (6 entries)		11	11	11	33

== Medallists ==
Men

Event	Gold	Silver	Bronze
Time Trial	Martin Vinnicombe (AUS)	Gary Anderson (NZL)	Jon Andrews (NZL)
Sprint	Gary Neiwand (AUS)	Curt Harnett (CAN)	Jon Andrews (NZL)
Individual Pursuit	Gary Anderson (NZL)	Mark Kingsland (AUS)	Darren Winter (AUS)
Team Pursuit	New Zealand; Gary Anderson; Nigel Donnelly; Glenn McLeay; Stuart Williams	Australia; Brett Aitken; Steve McGlede; Shaun O'Brien; Darren Winter	England; Chris Boardman; Simon Lillistone; Bryan Steel; Glen Sword
10 Miles Scratch	Gary Anderson (NZL)	Shaun O'Brien (AUS)	Steve McGlede (AUS)
Points Race	Robert Burns (AUS)	Craig Connell (NZL)	Alastair Irvine (NIR)
Road Race	Graeme Miller (NZL)	Brian Fowler (NZL)	Scott Goguen (CAN)
Road TTT	New Zealand; Brian Fowler; Gavin Stevens; Graeme Miller; Ian Richards	Canada; Christopher Koberstein; David Spears; Peter Verhesen; Sean Way	England; Chris Boardman; Peter Longbottom; Ben Luckwell; Wayne Randle

Women

Event	Gold	Silver	Bronze
Sprint	Louise Jones (WAL)	Julie Speight (AUS)	Sue Golder (NZL)
Individual Pursuit	Madonna Harris (NZL)	Kathy Watt (AUS)	Kelly-Ann Way (CAN)
Road Race	Kathryn Watt (AUS)	Lisa Brambani (ENG)	Kathleen Shannon (AUS)

== Individual road race ==
Pos	Athlete	Time
1	(New Zealand) Graeme Miller	4:34:00.19
2	(New Zealand) Brian Fowler	4:34:00.39
3	(Canada) Scott Goguen	4:34:05.45
4	(Canada) David Spears	4:34:25.04
5	(England) Peter Longbottom	4:34:25.46
6	(Scotland) Andrew Young	4:34:25.85
7	(England) Wayne Randle	4:36:06.70
8	(Australia) Matthew John Bazzano	4:36:10.39
9	(Isle of Man) Stephen Porter	4:36:15.77
10	(Isle of Man) Andrew Nicholson	4:36:15.78
11	(Scotland) Andrew Matheson	4:36:19.03
12	(Malaysia) Kumaresan Murugayan	4:36:19.50
13	(Northern Ireland) David McCall	4:36:19.66
14	(Canada) Sean Way	4:36:19.74
15	(Wales) Matthew Postle	4:36:19.77
16	(New Zealand) Ian Richards	4:36:23.41
17	(Northern Ireland) Andrew Moss	4:36:24.54
18	(Isle of Man) Andrew Roche	4:48:01.00
19	(Northern Ireland) Cormac McCann	4:48:01.00
20	(Wales) Norman Hughes	4:48:01.00
21	(Hong Kong) Chak Bor Hui	4:48:01.00
22	(Hong Kong) Yuk Kwong Chan	4:48:01.00
23	(Hong Kong) Hung Tak Leung	4:48:01.00
24	(Hong Kong) Kau Wai Yu	4:48:14.81
25	(Northern Ireland) Malcolm Kane	4:50:19.00
26	(Guernsey) Ian Brown	4:58:19.00

== Road team time trial ==
Pos	Team	Time
1	(New Zealand) Stevens, Miller, Richards, Fowler	2:06:46.55
2	(Canada) Spears, Koberstein, Verhesen, Way	2:09:19.59
3	(England) Boardman, Longbottom, Luckwell, Randle	2:09:33.71
4	(Scotland) Ferry, Matheson, B. Smith, D. Smith	2:10:56.16
5	(Australia) Keech, Grindal, Logan, Lancaster	2:15:19.77
6	(Northern Ireland) Irvine, McCann, Barr, McCall	2:18:51.22
7	(Wales) Postle, Evans, N. Hughes, R. Hughes	2:20:04.83
8	(Zimbabwe) Mandy, Stewart, Gouws, Draver	2:23:42.48
9	(Isle of Man) Nicholson, Roche, Harrison, Porter	2:24:34.21
10	(Hong Kong) Chak Bor Hui, Chi Kwong Suen, Hung Tak Leung, Kau Wai Yu	2:29:35.20

== Ten miles scratch race ==
Pos	Athlete	Time
1	(New Zealand) Gary Anderson	19:44.20
2	(Australia) Shaun O'Brien	19:44.22
3	(Australia) Stephen McGlede	19:44.26
4	(Australia) Brett Aitken	19:44.35
5	(Canada) Yannick Cojan	19:44.39
6	(England) Glen Sword	19:44.45
7	(Wales) Richard Hughes	19:44.65
8	(England) Simon Lillistone	19:44.82
9	(New Zealand) Glenn McLeay	19:51.64

== One kilometre time trial ==
Pos	Athlete	
1	(Australia) Martin Vinnicombe	1:05.572
2	(New Zealand) Gary Anderson	1:06.196
3	(New Zealand) Jon Andrews	1:06.516
4	(New Zealand) Anthony Graham	1:06.530
5	(Australia) David Ronald Dew	1:08.099
6	(Canada) Anthony Ward	1:08.184
7	(England) Adrian Hawkins	1:08.560
8	(Canada) Richard Young	1:08.665
9	(Wales) Steve Paulding	1:08.878
10	(England) David Baker	1:09.241

== 4,000m individual pursuit ==
Pos	Athlete
1	(New Zealand) Gary Anderson
2	(Australia) Mark Kingsland
3	(Australia) Darren Anthony Winter
4	(New Zealand) Craig Connell
5	(New Zealand) Jason Smith
5	(Canada) Jacques Naubert
5	(Australia) Shaun O'Brien
5	(England) Bryan Steel

Quarter finals

- Connell bt Smith 4.48.900 / +1.550
- Winter bt O'Brien 4.50.512 / +5.340
- Anderson bt Naubert 4.48.310 / +4.570
- Kingsland bt Steel 4.48.130 / +8.120

Semi finals

- Anderson bt Connell 4.52.150 / +3.100
- Kingsland bt Winter 4.48.660 / +2.950

Final

- Anderson bt Kingsland 4.44.610 / +8.140

== Team pursuit ==
Pos	Team
1	(New Zealand) Anderson, Donnelly, McLeay, Williams
2	(Australia) Aitken, McGlede, O'Brien, Winter
3	(England) Boardman, Lillistone, Steel, Sword
4	(Canada) Naubert, Gauthier, Scaletta, Cojan

Semi finals

- New Zealand bt England 4.26.410 / +0.075
- Australia bt Canada 4.31.580 / +9.360

Final

- New Zealand bt Australia 4.22.7 / +2.820

== 1,000m match sprint ==
Pos	Athlete
1	(Australia) Gary Neiwand
2	(Canada) Curt Harnett
3	(New Zealand) Jon Andrews
4	(Australia) David Joseph Spessot
5	(Scotland) Eddie Alexander
6	(New Zealand) Russell Ownsworth
7	(Trinidad and Tobago) Maxwell Cheesman
8	(Scotland) Stewart Brydon

Quarter finals

- Harnett bt Ownsworth
- Neiwand bt Cheesman
- Andrews bt Brydon
- Spessot bt Alexander

Semi finals

- Harnett bt Andrews
- Newiand bt Spessot

Bronze

- Andrews bt Spessot

Final

- Neiwand bt Harnett

== Points race ==
Pos	Athlete	Time
1	(Australia) Robert Burns	81
2	(New Zealand) Craig Connell	72
3	(Northern Ireland) Alastair Irvine	39
4	(Wales) Richard Hughes	26
5	(Isle of Man) Stephen Porter	25
6	(Jamaica) Peter Aldridge	23
7	(England) Spencer Wingrave	12
8	(Australia) Brett Aitken	42 (1 lap down)
9	(Northern Ireland) David McCall	20 (1 lap down)
10	(Canada) Perry Scaletta	18 (1 lap down)
11	(New Zealand) Mark Lucas	14 (1 lap down)
12	(England) David Baker	9 (1 lap down)
13	(Canada) Yannick Cojan	8 (1 lap down)
14	(Cayman Islands) Mitchell Smith	1 (1 lap down)

== Women's individual road race ==
Pos	Athlete	Time
1	(Australia) Kathy Watt	1:55:11.60
2	(England) Lisa Brambani	1:55:11.88
3	(Australia) Kathleen Shannon	1:55:12.06
4	(New Zealand) Madonna Harris	1:55:12.23
5	(Canada) Sara Neill	1:55:12.24
6	(Canada) Denise Kelly	1:55:12.60
7	(Canada) Kelly-Ann Way	1:55:12.89
8	(Australia) Donna Gould	1:55:12.98
9	(New Zealand) Kathy Lynch	1:55:14.25
10	(Wales) Clare Greenwood	1:55:14.41
11	(New Zealand) Sally Fraser	1:55:16.34
12	(England) Maria Blower	2:01:10.3
13	(New Zealand) Susan Matthews	2:01:42.22
14	(Isle of Man) Marie Purvis	2:01:42.24
15	(Australia) Jane Slack-Smith	2:04:15.98
16	(Canada) Alison Sydor	2:07:22.08
17	(Northern Ireland) Vanda McVicker	2:16:09.00

== Women's 3,000m individual pursuit ==
Pos	Athlete
1	(New Zealand) Madonna Harris
2	(Australia) Kathy Watt
3	(Canada) Kelly-Ann Way
4	(Australia) Donna Gould
5	(Canada) Kelly Ann Carter-Erdman
6	(Canada) Alison Sydor
7	(England) Maxine Johnson
8	(Wales) Sally McKenzie

Quarter finals

- Watt bt Johnson 3.52.740 / +17.510
- Harris bt Sydor 3.52.670 / +
- Gould bt Erdman 3.55.500 / +
- Way bt McKenzie 3.55.570 / +3.990

Semi finals

- Watt bt Gould 3.55.850 / +5.080
- Harris bt Way 3.57.050 / +3.010

Final

- Harris bt Watt 3.54.670 / +3.900

== Women's 1,000m match sprint ==
Pos	Athlete
1	(Wales) Louise Jones
2	(Australia) Julie Speight
3	(New Zealand) Sue Golder
4	(New Zealand) Tania Duff
5	(Canada) Samantha Deutscher
6	(England) Roberta Rushworth
7	(England) Jacqueline Harris
8	(Canada) Alison Sydor

Quarter finals

- Speight bt Harris
- Jones bt Rushworth
- Duff bt Sydor
- Golder bt Deutscher

Semi finals

- Speight bt Duff
- Jones bt Golder

Bronze

- Golder bt Duff

Final

- Jones bt Speight
