= Cycling at the 1988 Summer Olympics =

Cycling at the Games of the XXIV Olympiad
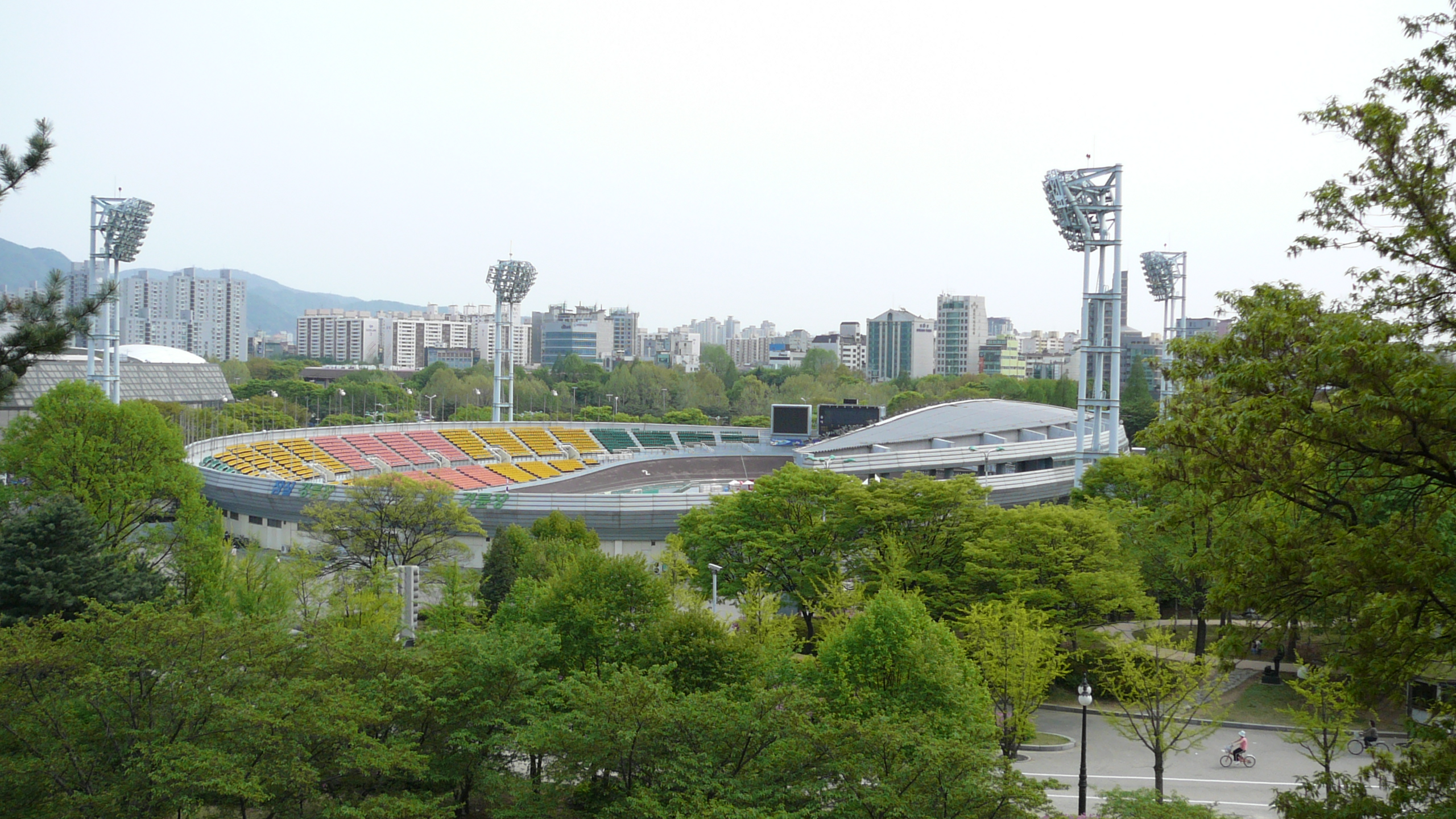
- The Seoul Olympic Velodrome in 2008
- Venues: Tongillo Road Course; Seoul Olympic Velodrome
- Date: 8–24 September 1988
- Competitors: 422 from 62 nations

The cycling competitions at the 1988 Olympic Games in Seoul consisted of two different categories: road cycling and track cycling. Nine events were contested, including the first women's sprint event at the Olympics.

== Road cycling ==
=== Men's ===
Event	Gold	Silver	Bronze
Road race	Olaf Ludwig; East Germany	Bernd Gröne; West Germany	Christian Henn; West Germany
Team time trial	East Germany; Jan Schur; Uwe Ampler; Mario Kummer; Maik Landsmann	Poland; Andrzej Sypytkowski; Joachim Halupczok; Zenon Jaskuła; Marek Leśniewski	Sweden; Michel Lafis; Anders Jarl; Björn Johansson; Jan Karlsson

=== Women's ===
Games	Gold	Silver	Bronze
Road race	Monique Knol; Netherlands	Jutta Niehaus; West Germany	Laima Zilporite; Soviet Union

== Track cycling ==
=== Men's ===
Games	Gold	Silver	Bronze
Points race	Dan Frost; Denmark	Leo Peelen; Netherlands	Marat Ganeyev; Soviet Union
Individual pursuit	Gintautas Umaras; Soviet Union	Dean Woods; Australia	Bernd Dittert; East Germany
Team pursuit	Soviet Union; Viatcheslav Ekimov; Artūras Kasputis; Dmitry Nelyubin; Gintautas Umaras	East Germany; Carsten Wolf; Steffen Blochwitz; Roland Hennig; Dirk Meier	Australia; Scott McGrory; Dean Woods; Brett Dutton; Wayne McCarney; Stephen McGlede
Sprint	Lutz Heßlich; East Germany	Nikolay Kovsh; Soviet Union	Gary Neiwand; Australia
1 km time trial	Aleksandr Kirichenko; Soviet Union	Martin Vinnicombe; Australia	Robert Lechner; West Germany

=== Women's ===
Games	Gold	Silver	Bronze
Sprint	Erika Salumäe; Soviet Union	Christa Luding-Rothenburger; East Germany	Connie Young; United States

== Participating nations ==
422 cyclists from 62 nations competed.

- Algeria (2)
- Andorra (2)
- Antigua and Barbuda (2)
- Argentina (7)
- Australia (17)
- Austria (7)
- Barbados (2)
- Belgium (6)
- Belize (5)
- Bolivia (1)
- Brazil (8)
- Canada (11)
- Cayman Islands (6)
- China (9)
- Chinese Taipei (2)
- Colombia (7)

- Zaire (4)
- Czechoslovakia (13)
- Denmark (9)
- East Germany (17)
- Ecuador (1)
- Finland (4)
- France (16)
- Great Britain (17)
- Guatemala (5)
- Guyana (2)
- Hong Kong (5)
- Hungary (1)
- Iran (7)
- Ireland (5)
- Italy (18)

- Jamaica (3)
- Japan (12)
- Lebanon (2)
- Libya (2)
- Liechtenstein (3)
- Malawi (4)
- Malaysia (2)
- Mexico (5)
- Monaco (1)
- Netherlands (13)
- New Zealand (13)
- Norway (5)
- Philippines (3)
- Poland (11)
- Sierra Leone (1)
- South Korea (15)

- Soviet Union (18)
- Spain (13)
- Suriname (1)
- Sweden (8)
- Switzerland (9)
- Trinidad and Tobago (2)
- United Arab Emirates (6)
- United States (19)
- Virgin Islands (1)
- Uruguay (3)
- Venezuela (4)
- Vietnam (1)
- West Germany (15)
- Yugoslavia (6)
- Zimbabwe (2)

== Medal table ==
Rank	Nation	Gold	Silver	Bronze	Total
1	Soviet Union	4	1	2	7
2	East Germany	3	2	1	6
3	Netherlands	1	1	0	2
4	Denmark	1	0	0	1
5	Australia	0	2	2	4
5	West Germany	0	2	2	4
7	Poland	0	1	0	1
8	Sweden	0	0	1	1
8	United States	0	0	1	1
Totals (9 entries)		9	9	9	27
