= Cycling at the 1988 Summer Olympics – Men's team time trial =

The men's team time trial event was part of the road cycling programme at the 1988 Summer Olympics. The time for the team was stopped after the third person on the team crossed the finish line. The venue for this event was the Tongil-ro Course, Paju, South Korea.

== Final standing ==
| Rank | Cyclists | Team | Time |
|---|---|---|---|
| 1st place, gold medalist(s) | Jan Schur; Uwe Ampler; Mario Kummer; Maik Landsmann | East Germany | 1:57:47.7 |
| 2nd place, silver medalist(s) | Andrzej Sypytkowski; Joachim Halupczok; Zenon Jaskuła; Marek Leśniewski | Poland | 1:57:54.2 |
| 3rd place, bronze medalist(s) | Michel Lafis; Anders Jarl; Björn Johansson; Jan Karlsson | Sweden | 1:59:47.3 |
| 4 | Laurent Bezault; Eric Heulot; Pascal Lance; Thierry Laurent | France | 1:59:49.8 |
| 5 | Roberto Maggioni; Eros Poli; Mario Scirea; Flavio Vanzella | Italy | 1:59:58.3 |
| 6 | Ernst Christl; Bernd Gröne; Rajmund Lehnert; Remig Stumpf | West Germany | 2:00:06.3 |
| 7 | Vasily Zhdanov; Viktor Klimov; Asiat Saitov; Igor Sumnikov | Soviet Union | 2:00:27.0 |
| 8 | Vladimír Hrůza; Vladimír Kinšt; Milan Křen; Jozef Regec | Czechoslovakia | 2:00:57.1 |
| 9 | Stephen Fairless; Bruce Keech; Clayton Stevenson; Scott Steward | Australia | 2:02:24.6 |
| 10 | Norman Alvis; Jim Copeland; Tony Palmer; Andy Paulin | United States | 2:02:35.7 |
| 11 | Tom Cordes; Gerrit de Vries; Maarten den Bakker; Michel Zanoli | Netherlands | 2:03:28.4 |
| 12 | Brian Fowler; Greg Fraine; Paul Leitch; Gavin Stevens | New Zealand | 2:03:48.7 |
| 13 | Chris Koberstein; David Spears; Yvan Waddell; Brian Walton | Canada | 2:04:09.0 |
| 14 | Javier Aldanondo; Javier Carbayeda; Arturo Gériz; José Rodríguez | Spain | 2:05:11.4 |
| 15 | Valter Bonča; Sandi Papež; Robert Šebenik; Jože Smole | Yugoslavia | 2:05:35.1 |
| 16 | Dietmar Hauer; Norbert Kostel; Hans Lienhart; Mario Traxl | Austria | 2:06:14.5 |
| 17 | Guo Longchen; Liu Hong; Tang Xuezhong; Wu Weipei | China | 2:06:22.5 |
| 18 | Wanderley Magalhães Azevedo; César Daneliczen; Cássio Freitas; Marcos Mazzaron | Brazil | 2:07:11.7 |
| 19 | Philip Cassidy; Cormac McCann; John McQuaid; Stephen Spratt | Ireland | 2:07:59.7 |
| 20 | Phil Bateman; Harry Lodge; Ben Luckwell; David Spencer | Great Britain | 2:08:07.8 |
| 21 | Ángel Noé Alayón; Pedro Bonilla; Orlando Castillo; Julio Cesar Rodríguez | Colombia | 2:10:34.3 |
| 22 | Gabriel Cano; Guillermo Gutiérrez; Héctor Pérez; Luis Rosendo Ramos | Mexico | 2:12:46.4 |
| 23 | Moustafa Chichi; Abas Ismaili; Mehrdad Zafarzadeh; Syamak Zafarzadeh | Iran | 2:15:29.5 |
| 24 | Jo Deok-haeng; Lee Jin-ok; Park Hyeon-gon; Yu Byeong-heon | South Korea | 2:16:16.9 |
| 25 | Hui Chak Bor; Hung Chung Yam; Leung Hung Tak; Yu Kau Wai | Hong Kong | 2:16:43.6 |
| 26 | Óscar Aquino; Julio Illescas; Víctor Lechuga; Andrés Torres | Guatemala | 2:18:58.7 |
| 27 | Nicholas Baker; Alfred Ebanks; Craig Merren; Richard Pascal | Cayman Islands | 2:19:08.0 |
| 28 | Mobange Amisi; Ndjibu N'Golomingi; Pasi Mbenza; Kimpale Mosengo | Zaire | 2:21:37.3 |
| 29 | Ali Al-Abed; Ali Hayyaz; Sultan Khalifa; Naji Sayed | United Arab Emirates | 2:26:11.3 |
| 30 | Dyton Chimwaza; Daniel Kaswanga; George Nayeja; Amadu Yusufu | Malawi | 2:32:37.6 |
| | Fitzgerald Joseph; Charles Lewis; Michael Lewis; Earl Theus | Belize | DNF |
