= Ben Luckwell =

British cyclist

Personal information
- Born: 30 March 1966 (age 60) Thornbury, Gloucestershire, England

Cycling career
- Sport: Cycling
Medal record
Cycling
Representing England
Commonwealth Games
Bronze medal – third place	1990 Auckland	team time trial

Benjamin Luckwell (born 30 March 1966) is a British former cyclist. Luckwell competed in the team time trial at the 1988 Summer Olympics. He represented England and won a bronze medal in the team time trial, at the 1990 Commonwealth Games. won three stages of the Milk Race Tour of Britain, and the sprints jersey in the Tour of Britain.

== Career ==
Luckwell competed in the team time trial at the 1988 Summer Olympics in Seoul, South Korea, alongside Phil Bateman, Harry Lodge and David Spencer.

He represented England and won a bronze medal in the team time trial, at the 1990 Commonwealth Games in Auckland, New Zealand, racing alongside Chris Boardman, Peter Longbottom and Wayne Randle. Luckwell won three stages of the Milk Race Tour of Britain, including into Leicester in 1993. He was a member of Team Raleigh Banana that supported compatriot Chris Lillywhite to win the overall race classification that year. He also won the sprints jersey in the Tour of Britain.

His career on the domestic British racing scene had great longevity. He won the Severn Bridge road race in 1984 and 1985, and also finished in third place at the race in 2007. In February 2008, at the age of 41 years-old, he became rider-manager of the newly-launched Sport Beans Willier team. In 2011, he was still competing in Great Britain in British Cycling masters age-group races. At the age of 48 years-old in 2014, he was still winning races in the Cotswold League.

== Personal life ==
He is a motorbike racing enthusiast. He is from Thornbury, Gloucestershire and was also based in Whitchurch.
