= Täve Schur =

East German bicycle racer and politician (born 1931)

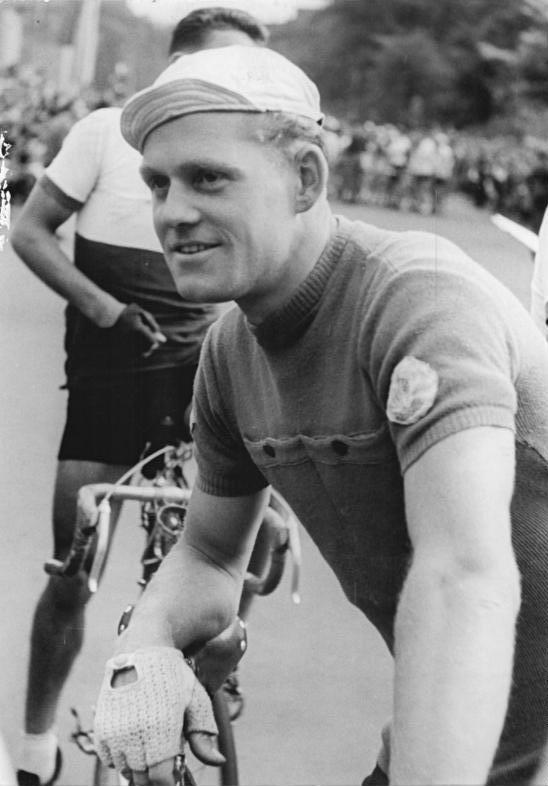
- Schur before a race in 1956

Personal information
- Full name: Gustav-Adolf Schur
- Born: 23 February 1931 (age 95) Heyrothsberge, Germany
- Height: 1.75 m (5 ft 9 in)
- Weight: 73 kg (161 lb)

Cycling career
- Sport: Cycling
- Current team: Retired
- Role: Rider

Major wins
- 1955 Peace Race; 1959 Peace Race; 1958 Amateur World Road Race Champion; 1959 Amateur World Road Race Champion
Medal record
Men's cycling
Representing Germany
Olympic Games
Silver medal – second place	1960 Rome	Team time trial
Bronze medal – third place	1956 Melbourne	Team road race
World Championships
Gold medal – first place	1958 Reims	Amateur's Road race
Gold medal – first place	1959 Zandvoort	Amateur's Road race
Silver medal – second place	1960 Sachsenring	Amateur's Road race

Gustav-Adolf "Täve" Schur (born 23 February 1931) is a former East German cyclist. He was born in Heyrothsberge, Saxony. His sporting career began with SC DHfK Leipzig. He was the first German to win the amateur competition of the World Cycling Championships and the Peace Race. Between 1958 and 1990 Schur was a member of the Volkskammer, the East German parliament.

== Life ==
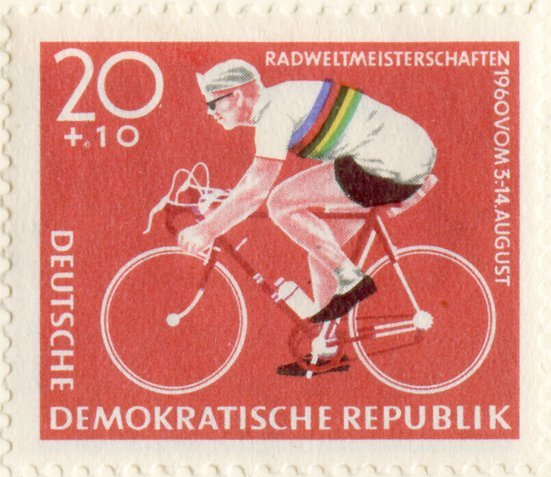
East German postage stamp depicting Schur, 1960

"Täve" Schur (a shortening of Gustav-Adolf) grew up near Magdeburg. He took up cycling aged 19 and won the highest honors an amateur cyclist could reach. Schur won the East German championships six times in that period and the GDR tour four times. In 1953 he played a part in East Germany winning the blue jersey of the best team at the Peace Race. In 1955, he was the first East German to win the Peace Race, considered the most prestigious amateur stage race. Schur won the Peace Race once more in 1959.

As a member of the United Team of Germany he won a bronze medal in the team time trial at the 1956 Summer Olympics in Melbourne and a silver medal at the 1960 Summer Olympics in Rome, at a time when the impact East Germany would have in later Olympic Games was not foreseen. Between 1955 and 1963 Schur studied at the DHfK Leipzig and finished with a diploma as coach. Schur achieved two wins at the amateur road race at the road world championships in 1958 and again in 1959 when he was the first amateur to defend his title. He won the DDR Rundfahrt in 1953, 1954, 1959 and 1961.

At the 1960 UCI Road World Championships that took place at the Sachsenring, Schur was favorite to defend his title again, but instead allowed his teammate Bernhard Eckstein to pass and eventually win the race. This gesture possibly contributed to his being voted the greatest East German sports personality of all time, 25 years after ending his career. Schur was selected as East German sports personality of the Year nine times in a row from 1953 to 1961. His son Jan (born 1962) won an Olympic gold medal in the team trial at the 1988 Summer Olympics, together with Uwe Ampler, Mario Kummer and Maik Landsmann.

Schur was more political than other sports people in East Germany. Between 1958 and 1990 he was a member of the Volkskammer. After German reunification he kept to his views and joined the SED successor party PDS and was a member of Germany's parliament, Bundestag, between 1998 and 2002.

Schur is a member of the "Kuratorium Friedensfahrt Course de la Paix e.V.". In 1992 Schur opened a bicycle store in Magdeburg that is now run by his son Gus-Erik Schur. "Täves Radladen" supports the bicycle racing club "RC Lostau" and takes part in races in Europe under the name "Team Täves Radladen". In May 2012 Schur re-rode two stages of the 1955 Peace Race, as part of the Alf Buttler Peace Race Tribute Ride.

== Honors ==
In 2005 the minor planet 2000 UR was named after Schur. It now has the official designation 38976 Taeve, circling the sun in an orbit between Mars and Jupiter.

== Books ==
- Adolf Klimanschewsky: Täve. Das Lebensbild eines Sportlers unserer Zeit. Sport Verlag, Berlin, 1955
- Klaus Ullrich: Unser Täve. Ein Buch über Gustav Adolf Schur. Sport-Verlag, Berlin, 1959.
- Klaus Ullrich: Unser Weltmeister. Sport-Verlag, Berlin, 1959
- Uwe Johnson: Das dritte Buch über Achim. Suhrkamp, Frankfurt am Main, 1962.
- Klaus Huhn: Das vierte Buch über Täve. Spotless-Verlag, Berlin, 1992, ISBN 3-928999-04-4
- Tilo Köhler: Der Favorit fuhr Kowalit. Täve Schur und die Friedensfahrt. Kiepenheuer, Leipzig 1997, ISBN 3-378-01015-0
- Klaus Huhn: Der Kandidat. Spotless-Verlag, Berlin, 1998, ISBN 3-92-8999-93-1
- Andreas Ciesielski:: Täve. Eine Legende wurde 70. Scheunen-Verlag, Kückenshagen 2001, ISBN 3-934301-47-9
- Gustav-Adolf Schur: Die Autobiographie. Das Neue Berlin Verlagsgesellschaft, Berlin, 2001, ISBN 3-360-00948-7
- Klaus Ullrich, Klaus Köste: Das 9. (neunte) Buch über Schur. Spotless-Verlag, Berlin, 2002, ISBN 3-933544-60-2
- Andreas Ciesielski: Typisch Täve. Scheunen-Verlag, Kückenshagen 2006, ISBN 3-938398-22-1
- Gustav-Adolf Schur: Täve, die Autobiografie. Gustav Adolf Schur erzählt sein Leben. Verlag Das Neue Berlin, Berlin 2011, ISBN 978-3-355-01783-1
- Gustav-Adolf Schur: Der Ruhm und ich. Spotless-Verlag, Berlin, 2011, ISBN 978-3-360-02054-3
- Gustav-Adolf Schur: Täve, die Autobiografie. Gustav Adolf Schur erzählt sein Leben. 2. überarbeitete und erweiterte Auflage, Verlag Das Neue Berlin, Berlin 2011, ISBN 978-3-355-01783-1
