= 1985 UCI Road World Championships =

- Venue: Giavera del Montello, Italy
- Date: 1 September 1985
- Coordinates: 45°48′N 12°10′E
- Events: 4

The 1985 UCI Road World Championships took place on 1 September 1985 in Giavera del Montello, Italy.

In the same period, the 1985 UCI Track Cycling World Championships were organized in Bassano del Grappa.

== Results ==
Race:	Gold:	Time	Silver:	Time	Bronze :	Time
Men
Men's road race	Joop Zoetemelk; Netherlands	6.26'38"	Greg LeMond; United States	+ 3"	Moreno Argentin; Italy	+ 3"
Amateurs' road race	Lech Piasecki; Poland	-	Johnny Weltz; Denmark	-	Franck Van De Vijver; Belgium	-
Team time trial	Soviet Union; Vassili Jdanov; Viktor Klimov; Igor Sumnikov; Alexandre Zinoviev	-	Czechoslovakia; Vladimir Hruza; Milan Jurčo; Michal Klasa; Milan Křen	-	Italy; Marcello Bartalini; Massimo Podenzana; Eros Poli; Claudio Vandelli	-
Women
Women's road race	Jeannie Longo; France	-	Maria Canins; Italy	-	Sandra Schumacher; West Germany	-

== Medal table ==
Rank	Nation	Gold	Silver	Bronze	Total
1	France (FRA)	1	0	0	1
1	Netherlands (NED)	1	0	0	1
1	Poland (POL)	1	0	0	1
1	Soviet Union (URS)	1	0	0	1
5	Italy (ITA)	0	1	2	3
6	Czechoslovakia (TCH)	0	1	0	1
6	Denmark (DEN)	0	1	0	1
6	United States (USA)	0	1	0	1
9	Belgium (BEL)	0	0	1	1
9	West Germany (FRG)	0	0	1	1
Totals (10 entries)		4	4	4	12
