= Lee Byung-hun (disambiguation) =

Lee Byung-hun (born 1970) is a South Korean actor.

Lee Byung-hun (Korean: 이병헌) is a Korean name consisting of the family name Lee and the given name Byung-hun, and may also refer to:

- Lee Byung-heon (biochemist), South Korean biochemist
- Lee Byeong-heon (filmmaker) (born 1980), South Korean filmmaker
- Byung Hun (entertainer) (born 1993), South Korean actor and singer
- Lee Byung-hoon (born 1944), South Korean television director
