= Maggioni =

Maggioni is an Italian surname. Notable people with the surname include:

- Enrico Maggioni (born 1946), Italian cyclist
- Ferdinando Maggioni (1914–1998), Italian prelate of the Catholic Church
- Lorenzo Maggioni (born 1984), Italian football referee
- Michela Maggioni (born 1988), Italian fashion model
- Roberto Maggioni (born 1968), Italian cyclist
- Vittorio Maggioni (1930–2017), Italian runner
