= Krenn =

Krenn is a surname. Notable people with the surname include:

- Franz Krenn (1816–1897), Austrian composer
- Gert Krenn, Austrian bobsledder
- Harald W. Krenn (born 1958), Austrian biologist
- Kurt Krenn, (1936-2014), Austrian Catholic bishop
- Sherrie Austin (born Sherrie Krenn), Australian actress and singer
- Veit Krenn (born 1960), American-born, German pathologist of Austrian origin
- Werner Krenn (born 1943), Austrian tenor

== See also ==
- Kren
- Dominique Crenn, a French chef
