= Michael Schnitzler =

Austrian American ecologist and musician

Michael Schnitzler (born August 7, 1944, in Berkeley, California) is an Austrian American ecologist and musician.

== Concert violinist and professor ==
Michael Schnitzler was born to Austrian parents, Heinrich (1902–1982) and Lilly Schnitzler (born 1911), née Strakosch-Feldringen, the daughter of the sugar industrialist Siegfried Strakosch, who fled from the country after the Anschluss in 1938. He is also the grandson of the Austrian writer Arthur Schnitzler. In 1959 the family moved back to Vienna, where he studied violin at the University of Music and Performing Arts, Vienna. At the age of 15 he played in the Vienna State Opera and the Vienna Philharmonic as a substitute, and from 1967 to 1983 he was first concertmaster of the Vienna Symphony. From 1982 to 2006 he was professor of violin at the University of Music and Performing Arts, Vienna. Since 1968, he has been violinist of the Haydn Trio Wien (together with pianist Heinz Medjimorec and cellist Walther Schulz), playing over 1500 concerts and recording a substantial part of the piano trio literature.

== Nature lover and conservationist ==
Michael Schnitzler founded the NGO Rainforest of the Austrians with the purpose of collecting funds to buy land within the Esquinas forest, Costa Rica. Soon, his voluntary work as a conservationist took up more time than his profession as a musician. Rainforest of the Austrians has since raised more than $3,000,000 and purchased 10,000 acres of rainforest, which were donated to the Costa Rican government to become part of Piedras Blancas National Park.

== See also ==
- Field Station La Gamba

== Sources ==
- esquinaslodge.com
