= Hruza =

Hruza, or Hrůza, is a Czech surname meaning Fright. Notable people with the surname include:

- George J. Hruza (fl. 1978), Czechoslovak-born American dermatologist
- Vladimír Hrůza (born 1960), Czech cyclist
