= Heulot =

Heulot is a surname. Notable people with the surname include:

- Éric Heulot (born 1962), French cyclist
- Stéphane Heulot (born 1971), French cyclist
