= Kren =

Kren or Křen ("horseradish" in Czech and Austrian German) is a surname. Notable people with the surname include:

- Brigitte Kren (born 1954), Austrian actress
- Jan Křen (1930–2020), Czech historian
- Kurt Kren (1929–1998), Austrian filmmaker
- Marvin Kren (born 1980), Austrian director
- Milan Křen (born 1965), Czech cyclist
- Vladimir Kren (1903–1948), Croatian major general

== See also ==
- Krenn
- KREN-TV
- Thomas Krens, former director of the Solomon R. Guggenheim Foundation
- Dominique Crenn, a French chef
