= Kelly-Ann Way =

Canadian cyclist

Personal information
- Born: September 18, 1964 (age 61) Windsor, Ontario, Canada
- Education: University of Windsor
Medal record
Women's cycling
Representing Canada
Pan American Games
| Silver medal – second place | 1987 Indianapolis | Individual Pursuit |
Commonwealth Games
| Bronze medal – third place | 1990 Auckland | Individual Pursuit |

Kelly-Ann Way (born September 18, 1964) is a Canadian retired track cyclist and road bicycle racer.

== Life and career ==
Way was born in Windsor, Ontario, on September 18, 1964, and began cycling at the age of seven and in 1975 she joined the Windsor Bicycle Club. She became a member of the Canadian National Cycling Team in 1983. She studied at the University of Windsor between 1983 and 1987 and graduated with a Bachelor with Honours in Human Kinetics.

In 1979 she won the Ontario provincial road championship at 15 years old and won her first national road race in 1980. She competed at the national track championships in 1982 where she won a silver medal in the individual points race and a bronze medal in the 3000m individual pursuit; in 1983 where she won a gold medal in the individual pursuit and a bronze medals in the 1000m time trial, the points race and the omnium event; and in 1991 where she won a gold medal in the omnium event.

Way competed at the 1987 Pan American Games where she won a silver medal in the 3000m Individual Pursuit track event. She also competed at the 1990 Commonwealth Games where she won a bronze medal in the individual pursuit event and came 7th in the women's road race.

She represented Canada at the Summer Olympics in 1988 where she came in 38th place in the Women's individual road race event and in 1992 where she came in 14th in the women's individual pursuit event and 31st in the women's individual road race event.

In 1984 she won the 8th stage in the Tour de France Féminin at 1 hour, 52 minutes 39 seconds. She was in 4th place after the 10th stage but injured her shoulder during a crash in the 12th stage. She finished the race in 20th place. She competed the Tour de France féminin again in 1985, 1987 and 1989 and the Tour de la CEE féminin in 1990 and 1991. In 1989 she became the first Canadian woman to wear the maillot jaune after leading the race for a short period. She finished 10th at the 1989 race which was her highest finishing place at the competition. She also finished 4th in the 1989 Tour de l'Aude Cycliste Féminin, won the Tour of Tasmania in 1990 and came 2nd in the 1990 Gastown Grand Prix.

She was inducted into the Windsor/Essex County Sports Hall of Fame in 1998 and was Ontario Cycling Association's Sportswoman of the Year in 1984, 1986, 1987, 1988 and 1990. She retired as a competitive cyclist in 1993 and became a massage therapist based in Windsor, Ontario.
