= Walter Kamper =

Austrian classical pianist

Walter Kamper (6 October 1931 – 26 September 2015) was an Austrian pianist.

== Life ==
Born in Vienna, Kamper studied with Richard Hauser, at the Vienna University of Music and Performing Arts and with Helmut Roloff, at the Berlin State University of Music and Performing Arts. He made his debut as a concert pianist in 1951 in Vienna. From 1963 until his retirement in 2000, he taught at the University of Music and Performing Arts Graz. With Michael Schnitzler and Walther Schulz, he founded the Haydn Trio Wien in 1964. In 1979, he was appointed full professor of piano at the university.

Kamper was a laureate of numerous international competitions, including the Geneva International Music Competition 1952 and the 1960 Brussels Queen Elisabeth Competition. In 1996, he was awarded the Austrian Decoration for Science and Art.

Kamper died in Graz at the age of 83.
