= Peter Longbottom =

British racing cyclist (1959–1998)

Personal information
- Born: 13 May 1959 Huddersfield, England
- Died: 10 February 1998 (aged 38) York, England

Cycling career
- Sport: Cycling
Medal record
Cycling
Representing England
Commonwealth Games
Bronze medal – third place	1990 Auckland	team time trial
Silver medal – second place	1994 Victoria	team time trial

Peter Longbottom (13 May 1959 – 10 February 1998) was a British road racing and time triallist cyclist. He won more than 40 national championship medals and won bronze and silver medals in the team time trial event at the 1990 and 1994 Commonwealth Games.

== Cycling career ==
Longbottom was born on 13 May 1959 in Huddersfield to cycling parents. He began cycling with Clifton Cycling Club and Velo Club York with whom he won his first national team time trial medal, a bronze, in 1978. He joined the Manchester Wheelers in the 1980s and also rode for GS Strada and North Wirral Velo. He briefly rode with A.C.B.B. during the 1982 season leading to an offer to turn professional with Wolber, which he declined.

Combining his cycling career with a full time job as a civil engineer at Ryedale District Council, he won the Tour of the Cotswold road race in 1983 and 1989, the Grand Prix of Essex in 1984 and the Archer International in 1992, and over 40 medals in national competitions. He competed in the Milk Race ten times, winning the opening stage in 1989 in Bournemouth.

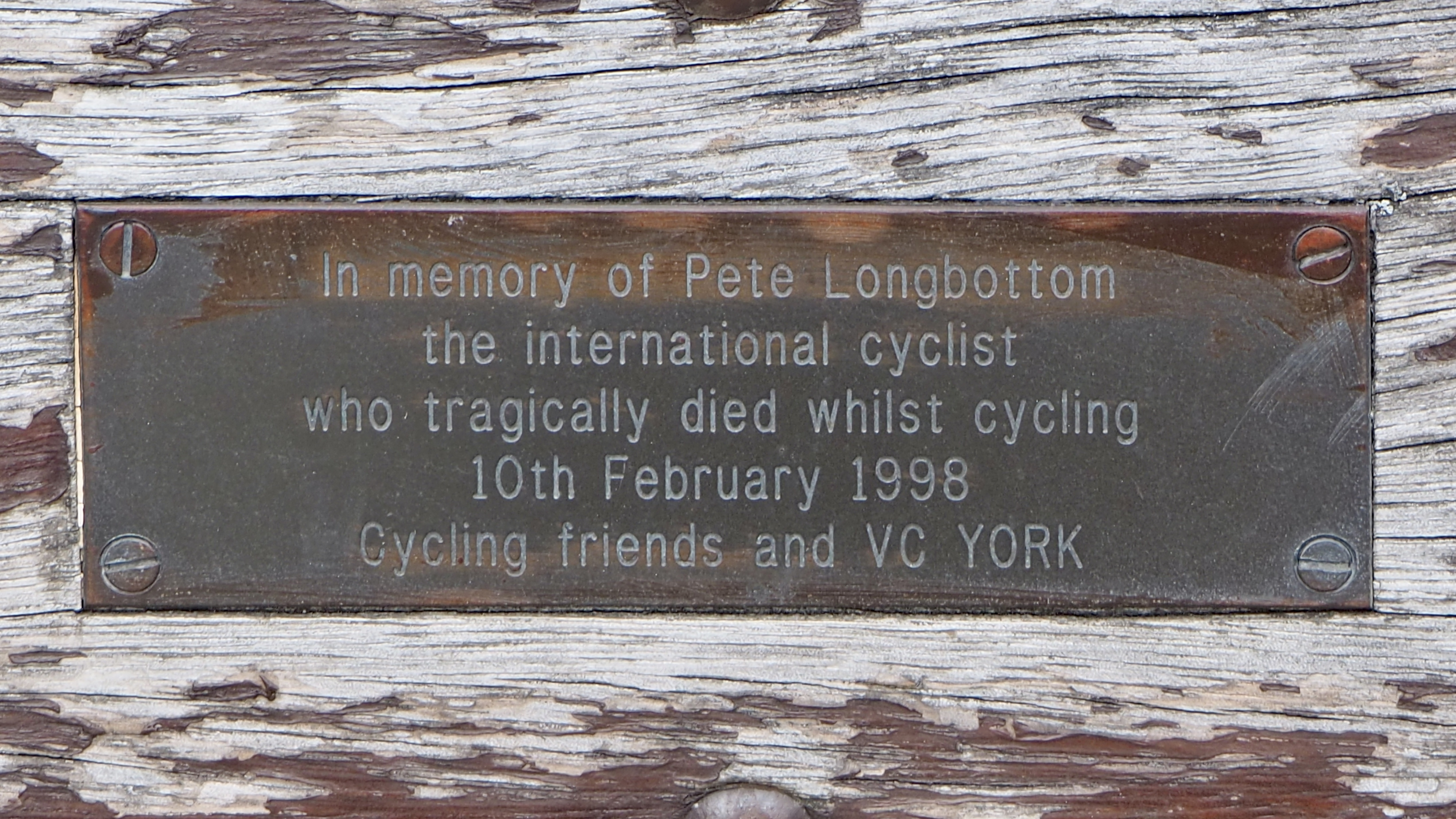
Memorial plaque for Pete Longbottom in York.

He won a bronze medal in the team time trial, riding with Chris Boardman, Ben Luckwell and Wayne Randle, at the 1990 Commonwealth Games in Auckland, New Zealand, and finished fifth in the road race. Also in 1990, he broke the 25-mile time trial record held by Alf Engers for 12 years with a time of 49 minutes 13 seconds and won the national 100-mile time trial, beating Gethin Butler by four minutes. Four years later at the 1994 Commonwealth Games in Victoria, British Columbia, Canada, he won silver medal in the team time trial with Matt Illingworth, Paul Jennings and Simon Lillistone. He competed in the team time trial at the 1992 Summer Olympics in Barcelona finishing 14th.

Longbottom retired from racing in 1996. He died on 10 February 1998 following a road accident near York as he was cycling on the A64.
