= Byeong-heon =

- Hangul: 병헌
- RR: Byeongheon
- MR: Pyŏnghŏn

Byeong-heon, also spelled Byung-hun, or Pyong-hon, is a Korean given name.

People with this name include:

- Yu Byeong-heon (born 1964), South Korean cyclist
- Lee Byung-hun (born 1970), South Korean actor
- Lee Byeong-heon (filmmaker) (born 1980), South Korean filmmaker
- Min Byung-hun (born 1987), South Korean baseball right fielder
- Lee Byung-heon (biochemist), South Korean biochemist

== See also ==
- List of Korean given names
