= Olga Hegedus =

English cellist (1920–2017)

Olga Hegedus

Olga Catherine Mary Elizabeth Hegedus (18 October 1920 – 22 April 2017) was an English cellist who was co-principal of the English Chamber Orchestra. She performed at the wedding of Prince Charles and Lady Diana Spencer.

== Life ==
Olga Catherine Mary Elizabeth Hegedus was born on 18 October 1920, in London. Her father was renowned Hungarian violinist Ferencz Hegedus, and her mother Kitty Buckley from a family who owned land in Saddleworth Moor. Hegedus was the second of three daughters. She was educated in Hungary, Belgium and France before the family settled back in London in 1928. She attended the London Violoncello School. Her first solo recital took place in 1938 at Wigmore Hall, where her accompanist was Adolph Hallis. She made a television appearance in June 1939, and made many appearances for the armed forces during the Second World War. She worked with pianist Viola Tunnard and with ensembles including the Haydn Trio, and as part of the Nemet Ensemble which gave the 1968 premiere of a rediscovered Mahler piece.

Hegedus was, with Charles Tunnell, co-principal cellist of the English Chamber Orchestra. Through the ECO, she worked with Vladimir Ashkenazy, Daniel Barenboim and Mstislav Rostropovich. She performed at the wedding of Prince Charles and Lady Diana Spencer. She retired from the ECO in the 1970s, and taught privately. Hegedus played a 17th century Grancini cello, but had an English cello for less formal occasions, which she referred to as 'Apple Cheeks'.

Hegedus died on the 22 April 2017, aged 96, at a Catholic nursing home in Hammersmith. She did not marry.
