= La Gamba =

Village in Costa Rica

Coordinates: 8°42′30″N 83°11′00″W

La Gamba is a village in the Guaycará District of Golfito canton, which is part of Puntarenas Province of Costa Rica. Village inhabitants are employed in agriculture and in jobs offered in cities such as Golfito and Rio Claro.

This village was developed in conjunction with different projects that were started and ended during the last 50 years in La Gamba; including the arrival of the United Fruit Company in the 1950s, the implementation of the Austrian Esquinas Rainforest Lodge. Developmental projects were also started in collaboration with organizations from La Gamba, the Costa Rican government and the Austrians.

== Geography and climate ==
The village is in Puntarenas Province on the south-west side of the country, a few kilometers away from Panama and is reachable by the Pan-American. From the Villa Briceño (km 37) 3 km separate the Pan-American from the center of the village that is easily reachable. Rio Claro and Golfito are the closest cities and are the centers of services such as banks, supermarkets and drugstores. Piedras Blancas park is nearby. The park is little known and serves mainly for biological research.

The weather is tropical; the temperature varies between 21 °C and 39 °C and the region receives roughly 6000 mm of rain per year. There are two seasons: the winter (May–December) and the summer (January–April). The summer is the dry season while the winter, which stretches on a longer period, is the rainy season, and the greener period of the year and there is plenty of drinking water. This season is characterized by strong thunderstorms, floods and unstable weather.

== Population ==
In the village, there are roughly 700 inhabitants separated into 150 families. Half of these families live around the center of La Gamba, while the other half are spread out along the roads leading to the center of the village, in Rio Bonito and La Bolsa, which are about 30 minutes walking distance from the center.

There is a microcredit organization located in the city, which help support two groups of women that produce handcrafted natural shampoos and local artisans.

== Agriculture ==
Given a decline in the wood and banana industries in the region since the 1970s, most of the workers that chose to stay in the village converted themselves into farmers. The climate of the area is perfect for rice, corn, cacao and palm agriculture. Most farmers also own cows, pigs, horses or chickens.

In the last few years, the cultivation of palm previously taken from Africa has expanded exponentially, providing an important source of revenue for some families and employment for others.

== Work ==
Nowadays, many inhabitants work in the biological station and the Esquinas Rainforest Lodge. Others find employment in the construction of small bridges along the villages main road, and in neighboring cities such as Rio Claro. There also is the “deposito libre”, which is an important source of employments.

== Sports ==
The main and most traditional sport of Costa Rica is football (soccer). In the village, there is a sport committee which organizes games and takes care of the material. Near the center of the village and the community center, the youth play on the big football field. This field is used by people of all ages. During the summer, the kids are more active on the football field and the team practices often.

Others also like to play volleyball and can practice it in Rio Claro, but football remains the main sport played in the village. Another traditional sport is carrera de cintura, in which people climb horses at full speed. Prizes are handed out to the most courageous and the best. There are also “fiestas taurinas” in which men ride bulls, watch bull fights and a fair.

== Attractions ==
- El Río Bonito: This small quiet river situated along the road between La Gamba and Rio Bonito is perfect for the inhabitants who wish to cool down. Since the water comes from the mountains, it represents the principal source of drinking water. The level of the river depends on the weather. During the summer, the water level can be particularly low. For tourists it is preferable to swim with locals since they are familiar with the river and are aware of the quick changes in tides depending on the location. Also the river is known to have caimans.
- The Catarata « El Chorro »: The entrance of the waterfall is accessible from the main road towards the km 37 and is the perfect place to calm down and enjoy the nature and fresh water coming from the mountains. Tourists pay 1000 colons ($2 US), but this is definitively worthwhile. This is almost heaven.
- Piedras Blancas National Park: The park is home to one of the richest fauna and flora of Costa Rica. Despite low frequentation, the visit is worthwhile and even more attractive given its authenticity. This park is known for its enormous trees known as “Ceiba” and its biodiversity. A three-hour tour can be available and it can also be visited without.
- Austrian field station: The station was born in 1993 from a partnership between the Austrian NGO “Rainforest of the Austrians” and the University of Vienna in order to study and protect the biodiversity of the Esquinas forest.
- El Mirador (belvédère): The access is limited since the road crosses a private property; however with the right contacts in the village and preparation it is possible to climb it and be surprised by a splendid view of the Golfito region.
- Horse riding: A family in the village owns a few horses and offers tours as horses are part of the village's landscape.

== The Asociación Pro-Bienestar (ASOPROBI) ==
This organization was created in July 1996 to replace the previous organization COOPEGAMBA in order to find alternatives to the development of the village. ASOPROBI works in harmony with its natural environment, which is in fact its major wealth. The final goal of the organization is the creation of employment in the village and the promotion of sustainable and local tourism. The village has a lot to offer and ASOPROBI wishes to promote it. All the participants are volunteers and change every few years, except for Jose Angel Montiel Franco, who works permanently organizing multiple activities and administrating the budget. The direction is formed of the president, vice-president, secretary, and the fiscal administrator.

Between 2004 and 2009, Plan Nagua, a Canadian organism, and ASOPROBI have collaborated in order to send groups of interns that have contributed to the development of the community through different projects.

== Region (Golfito et Rio Claro) ==
Rio Claro is situated at about 20 minutes of bus from km 37. The inhabitants from La Gamba needs to go at least once a week to buy what is missing in the village. There are two banks, internet coffees, supermarkets, a clinic and drugstores that are essentials. For those who wish to get more services, there is Golfito that is about 45 min away from the km 37. The nearest hospital is also located in Golfito and there is a ferry that crosses a few times a day to Puerto Jimenez.
