= Yu Kau Wai =

Hong Kong cyclist

Personal information
- Born: 23 March 1965 (age 61)

Cycling career
- Sport: Cycling

Yu Kau Wai (born 23 March 1965) is a Hong Kong former cyclist. He competed in the team time trial at the 1988 Summer Olympics.
