= Abbas Esmaeili =

Iranian cyclist

Personal information
- Born: 21 March 1967 (age 59)

Cycling career
- Sport: Cycling

Abbas Esmaeili (Persian: عباس اسماعیلی, born 21 March 1967) is an Iranian former cyclist. He competed in the team time trial at the 1988 Summer Olympics.
