= Norbert Kostel =

Austrian cyclist

Personal information
- Born: 28 July 1966 (age 60)

Cycling career
- Sport: Cycling

Norbert Kostel (born 28 July 1966) is an Austrian former cyclist. He competed in the team time trial at the 1988 Summer Olympics.
