= Michel Lafis =

Swedish cyclist

Personal information
- Born: 19 September 1967 (age 59) Stockholm, Sweden

Cycling career
- Sport: Cycling
- Current team: Retired
- Discipline: Road
- Role: Rider

Professional teams
- 1993–1995: Amore & Vita–Galatron
- 1996–1997: Team Telekom
- 1998–2000: TVM–Farm Frites
Medal record
Representing Sweden
Men's road bicycle racing
Olympic Games
Bronze medal – third place	1988 Seoul	Team time trial

Michel Peter Lafis (born 19 September 1967) is a Swedish former cyclist. He won the bronze medal in the Men's 100 kilometres team time trial along with Jan Karlsson, Anders Jarl and Björn Johansson at the 1988 Summer Olympics. He also rode at the 1992, 1996 and the 2000 Summer Olympics.

== Major results ==
1987
2nd National Road Race Championships
1988
2nd National Road Race Championships
3rd Team time trial, Summer Olympics (with Anders Jarl, Björn Johansson and Jan Karlsson)
4th Overall Tour of Sweden
1990
2nd National Road Race Championships
1992
2nd Overall Tour de Liège
4th Overall Tour of Sweden

1st Stage 4

1994
2nd Overall Tour of Sweden

1st Stage 1

1995
1st Stage 4 Grand Prix Guillaume Tell
2nd Overall Tour of Sweden

1st Stage 3

3rd National Road Race Championships
3rd Tour de Berne
1996
National Road Championships

2nd Time trial
2nd Road race

4th Overall Tour of Sweden
1997
1st National Road Race Championships
1998
2nd National Road Race Championships
1999
2nd Circuito de Getxo
2000
3rd National Road Race Championships

=== Grand Tour general classification results timeline ===
Grand Tour	1994	1995	1996	1997	1998	1999	2000
Giro d'Italia	—	23	—	—	DNF	91	70
Tour de France	—	—	—	—	—	—	78
Vuelta a España	93	—	DNF	—	70	21	—

Legend
—	Did not compete
DNF	Did not finish
