= Javier Carbayeda =

Spanish cyclist (born 1966)

Personal information
- Born: 5 October 1966 (age 60) Usurbil, Spain

Cycling career
- Sport: Cycling

Javier Carbayeda (born 5 October 1966) is a Spanish former cyclist. He competed in the team time trial at the 1988 Summer Olympics.
