= Anders Jarl =

Swedish cyclist

Personal information
- Born: Anders Torsten Martin Jarl; 10 March 1965 (age 61) Stockholm, Sweden

Cycling career
- Sport: Cycling
Medal record
Representing Sweden
Men's road bicycle racing
Olympic Games
Bronze medal – third place	1988 Seoul	Team time trial

Anders Torsten Martin Jarl (born 10 March 1965) is a Swedish former cyclist. He won the bronze medal in the team time trial road race along with Jan Karlsson, Michel Lafis and Björn Johansson in the 1988 Summer Olympics.
