= Arturo Gériz =

Spanish cyclist

Personal information
- Born: 24 July 1964 (age 62) Soria, Spain

Cycling career
- Sport: Cycling

Arturo Gériz (born 24 July 1964) is a Spanish former cyclist. He competed in the team time trial at the 1988 Summer Olympics. As a part of the Spanish cycling team, he placed 14th in the 100-kilometer team time trial, completing the race with a time of 2:05:11.4
