= Hui Chak Bor =

Hong Kong cyclist (born 1968)

Personal information
- Born: 7 May 1968 (age 58)

Cycling career
- Sport: Cycling

Chinese name
- Traditional Chinese: 許澤波
- Hanyu Pinyin: Xǔ Zébō
- Yale Romanization: Héui Jaahk-bō

Hui Chak Bor (born 7 May 1968) is a Hong Kong former cyclist. He competed in the team time trial at the 1988 Summer Olympics. In 1998 he won a bronze medal at invitational competition in Taipei. By 2002, he had retired from international competition. He later became a manager for a Taiwan-based bicycle wheel rim manufacturing company.
