= Vladimír Kinšt =

Czech cyclist

Personal information
- Born: 11 November 1965 (age 60)

Cycling career
- Sport: Cycling

Vladimír Kinšt (born 11 November 1965) is a Czech former cyclist. He competed in the team time trial at the 1988 Summer Olympics.
