= Harald W. Krenn =

Austrian biologist

- Born: 25 October 1958 (age 67); Vienna, Austria
- Known for: Insect mouthparts
- Scientific career
- Fields: Zoology
- Workplaces: University of Vienna

Harald W. Krenn (born 25 October 1958) is an Austrian biologist and a professor for integrative zoology at the Fakultät für Lebenswissenschaften at the University of Vienna.

== Life ==
Harald W. Krenn studied biology and earth science from 1977 to 1978 and zoology and botany at the University of Vienna. He finished a study of lectureship and environmental science and received his PhD in 1987 in zoology and botany. Next to his work as a teacher of biology and as a product manager in the pharmaceutical industry Krenn became assistant professor in 1993 at the Institut für Zoologie at the University of Vienna. After his habilitation in 2001 he became assistant professor at the department of evolutionary biology and from 2012 on at the department of Intergative Zoologie. Since 2012 Krenn has been head of Studienprogramme in biology at the University of Vienna.

== Scientific contributions ==
The investigation of Krenn and co-workers contributed to reveal the form and functional mechanism of insect mouthparts relationships. The study of insect mouthparts was helpful for the understanding of the functional mechanism of the proboscis of butterflies (Lepidoptera) to elucidate the evolution of new forms and functions. The study of the proboscis of butterflies revealed surprising examples of adaptations to different kinds of fluid food, for example nectar, plant sap, tree sap, dung) and of adaptations to the use of pollen as complementary food in butterflies of the Neotropical genus Heliconius. An extremely-long proboscis appears within multiple groups of flower visiting insects but is relatively rare. Current studies represent the first attempt to evaluate the costs and benefits of these long sucking organs taking into consideration sucking and pumping organs of different insects. In a group of Lepidoptera, novel mouthpart organs were analysed in detail, not homologous to related raxa. A novel mouth part organ evolved in the female yucca moth and serves for the pollination of the larval host plant.

== Practical research activity ==
Krenn's research activity combines experimental field work, for example at the tropical Field Station La Gamba, Costa Rica, with morphological and experimental studies at the University of Vienna.

== Academic memberships ==
- Deutsche Zoologische Gesellschaft
- Austrian Entomological Society
- Birdlife Austria
- Auring-Verein
- Societas Europaea Lepidopterologica

== Publications ==
Selected papers:

- H. W. Krenn, J. Plant, N. U. Szucsich (2005) "Mouthparts of flower-visiting insects". In: Arthropod Structure & Development. 34, 2005, S. 1–40. doi:10.1016/j.asd.2004.10.002 pdf
- H. W. Krenn, B-A. Gereben-Krenn, B. M. Steinwender, A. Popov: "Flower visiting Neuroptera: mouthparts and feeding behaviour of Nemoptera sinuata (Nemopteridae)." In: European Journal of Entomology. 105, 2008, S. 267–277. pdf
- H. W. Krenn, H. Aspöck: "Form, Function and Evolution of the Mouthparts of Blood-Sucking Arthropods". In: Arthropod Structure & Development. 41, 2012, S. 101–118 doi:10.1016/j.asd.2011.12.001.
- A. Wilhemi, H. W. Krenn: "Elongated mouthparts of nectar-feeding Meloidae (Coleoptera)". In: Zoomorphology. 131, 2012, S. 325–337 doi:10.1007/s00435-012-0162-3.
- F. Karolyi, N. U. Szucsich, J. F. Colville, H. W. Krenn: "Adaptations for nectar-feeding in the mouthparts of long-proboscid flies (Nemestrinidae: Prosoeca)". In: Biological Journal of the Linnean Society. 107, 2012, S. 414–424. doi: 10.1111/j.1095-8312.2012.01945.x
