= Ali Hayyaz =

Emirati cyclist

Personal information
- Born: 1965 (age 60–61)

Cycling career
- Sport: Cycling

Ali Hayyaz (born 1965) is an Emirati former cyclist. He competed in the team time trial at the 1988 Summer Olympics.
