= Glen Sword =

British cyclist

Personal information
- Born: 10 November 1967 (age 58) Liverpool, England

Cycling career
- Sport: Cycling
Medal record
Cycling
Representing England
Commonwealth Games
Bronze medal – third place	1990 Auckland	team pursuit

Glen Sword (born 10 November 1967) is a male British former cyclist.

== Cycling career ==
He competed at the 1988 Summer Olympics and the 1992 Summer Olympics.

He represented England in the scratch race and won a bronze medal in the 4,000 metres team pursuit, at the 1990 Commonwealth Games in Auckland, New Zealand.
