= Robert Šebenik =

Yugoslavian cyclist

Personal information
- Born: 3 September 1965 (age 61) Ljubljana, Yugoslavia

Cycling career
- Sport: Cycling

Robert Šebenik (born 3 September 1965) is a Yugoslav former cyclist. He competed in the team time trial at the 1988 Summer Olympics.
