= Jim Copeland (cyclist) =

American cyclist

Personal information
- Born: March 18, 1962 (age 64) Huntsville, Alabama, United States

Cycling career
- Sport: Cycling

Jim Copeland (born March 18, 1962) is an American former cyclist. He competed in the team time trial at the 1988 Summer Olympics.
