= Björn Johansson (cyclist) =

Swedish cyclist (born 1963)

Personal information
- Born: 10 September 1963 (age 63) Vänersborg, Sweden

Cycling career
- Sport: Cycling
Medal record
Representing Sweden
Men's road bicycle racing
Olympic Games
Bronze medal – third place	1988 Seoul	Team time trial

Björn Olof Johansson (born 10 September 1963) is a Swedish former cyclist. He won the bronze medal in the team time trial road race along with Jan Karlsson, Michel Lafis and Anders Jarl in the 1988 Summer Olympics. He also rode at the 1992 Summer Olympics.
