= Klaus Ampler =

German cyclist

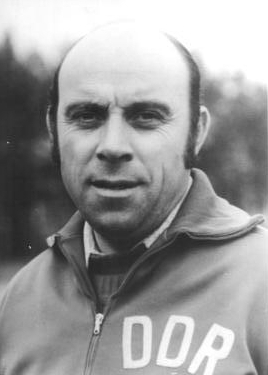
- Klaus Ampler in 1977

Personal information
- Born: 15 November 1940 Marienburg, West Prussia, Nazi Germany (modern Malbork, Poland)
- Died: 6 May 2016 (aged 75) Leipzig, Saxony, Germany

Cycling career
- Sport: Cycling

Klaus Ampler (15 November 1940 – 6 May 2016) was a German cyclist. His sporting career began with SC DHfK Leipzig. He competed for East Germany in the team time trial at the 1968 Summer Olympics. He won the peace race in 1963. He won the DDR Rundfahrt in 1962 and 1963. Ampler died at a nursing home in Leipzig on 6 May 2016 at the age of 75. He was the father of Uwe Ampler, who became a professional cyclist and was coached by his father in the 1980s.

== Books ==
Klaus Ampler: Schweiß. Autobiographie. Gotha, 2005, ISBN 3-9808816-9-5. (German)
