= Mehrdad Safarzadeh =

Iranian cyclist

Personal information
- Born: 12 February 1962 (age 64)

Cycling career
- Sport: Cycling

Mehrdad Safarzadeh (Persian: مهرداد صفرزاده, born 12 February 1962) is an Iranian former cyclist. He competed in the team time trial at the 1988 Summer Olympics.
