= Field Station La Gamba =

Coordinates: 8°42′03.78″N 83°12′06.14″W

Field Station La Gamba, in the “Rainforest of the Austrians” in Costa Rica, is an Austrian research, teaching and continuing-education institution, whose mission is to contribute to research on tropical rainforests, to generate interest in conservation and in rainforest research, and to give interested persons an opportunity to deepen their appreciation of nature within the rainforest.

Field Station La Gamba is situated in southern Costa Rica, on the edge of the parque nacional Piedras Blancas (“White Stones” National Park, formerly known as “Esquinas [‘Corners’] National Park,” previously known simply as “Section II,” an extension of Corcovado National Park). Yet another name for Piedras Blancas is “Rainforest of the Austrians" (der Regenwald der Österreicher). Occupying an area of 142 km², this tropical forest hosts a rich diversity of wildlife species. An initiative of the Austrians’ Rainforest Association (ARA) could prevent its deforestation. Beginning with a simple corrugated tin dwelling, which they purchased and refurbished with support from the ARA and from the University of Vienna, two Austrian biologists, Werner Huber and Anton Weissenhofer, founded Field Station La Gamba in 1993. Now an internationally recognized biological research station, it comprises several buildings with modern scientific equipment, as well as a botanical garden. It is the only Austrian station in the tropics.

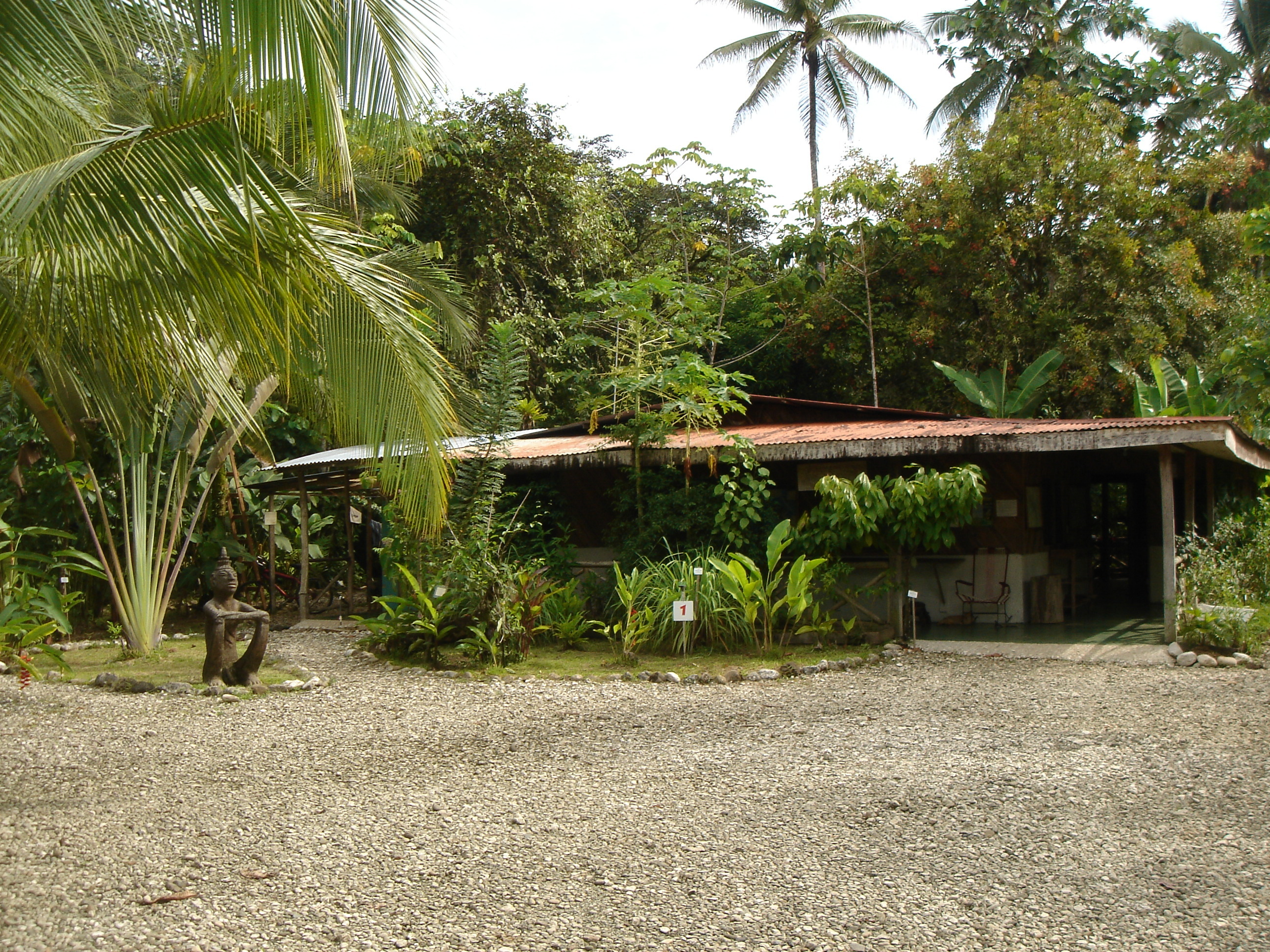
Field Station La Gamba

Field Station La Gamba is an important vehicle for the conservation of the Esquinas Forest, one of the last rainforests still under conservation in the lowlands of the Central American Pacific coast. It offers students, scientists and others, an excellent base for biological research and for learning about nature. A thriving ecotourism industry has also developed. The station has become an integral part of the community of La Gamba, and is an important resource for the local population, among whom the staff also promote conservation. For some years, station staff have also accompanied various aid-to-developing-nations projects in the region; for example, former woodcutters were trained as national park rangers and conservationists.

At first, the station was staffed predominantly by ARA members and was managed in conjunction with the University of Vienna. By 2002, the station had grown significantly and gained much notoriety, while the ARA wanted to refocus on its core mission of saving the forest; therefore, the “Field Station La Gamba Foundation” was established to fund and operate the station.

As of July 2007, Field Station La Gamba is a recognized service tour with the Austrian Service Abroad ( Österreichischer Auslandsdienst). A 10-month tour with the Austrian Service Abroad may be served in lieu of nine months of service in the Austrian Zivildienst (national civilian service), itself an alternative to military service. Common assignments at the station involve locally supportive roles in education programs (courses in language, computers, environmental protection), marketing, and medicinal agriculture.

== Publications ==
- Anton Weissenhofer; Werner Huber; Anton Weber; Georg Zimmermann; Nelson Zamora: "An introductory Field Guide to the flowering plants of the Corcovado and Piedras Blancas National Park (Regenwald der Österreicher).", OÖ Landesmuseum Linz, Biologiezentrum, Johann-Wilhelm Kleinstraße, 2001.
- Werner Huber; Anton Weissenhofer; Martina Fahrnberger; Anton Weber; Christoph Kastinger; Georg Krieger; Veronika Mayer; Renate Fischer: "Katalog zur Ausstellung "Helikonien und Kolibris" Der "Regenwald der Österreicher"in Costa Rica", Verein zur Förderung der Tropenstation La Gamba, Costa Rica, Rennweg 14, 1030 Wien, Austria, 2002.
- Werner Huber; Anton Weissenhofer: "The Amphibians & Reptiles of the Golfo Dulce Region, Costa Rica", Faculty Center of Botany, Rennweg 14, A-1030 Vienna, 2005.
