= Ernst Christl =

German cyclist

Personal information
- Born: 31 March 1964 (age 62) Munich, West Germany

Cycling career
- Sport: Cycling

Ernst Christl (born 31 March 1964) is a German former cyclist. He competed in the team time trial at the 1988 Summer Olympics.
