= Andy Paulin =

American cyclist

Personal information
- Born: November 29, 1958 (age 67) Palo Alto, California, United States

Cycling career
- Sport: Cycling

Andy Paulin (born November 29, 1958) is an American former cyclist. He competed in the team time trial at the 1988 Summer Olympics.

His ex-wife is cyclist Katrin Tobin who he met when Tobin was a member of the American national team.

In 1988, Andy Paulin recorded the highest total VO of any athlete in any sport to date at the Colorado Springs Olympic Training Center.
