= Rajmund Lehnert =

German cyclist

Personal information
- Born: 14 March 1965 (age 61) Wielowieś, Poland

Cycling career
- Sport: Cycling

Rajmund Lehnert (born 14 March 1965) is a German former cyclist. He competed in the team time trial at the 1988 Summer Olympics.
