= Bodhraj Acharya =

Nepalese-American biochemist

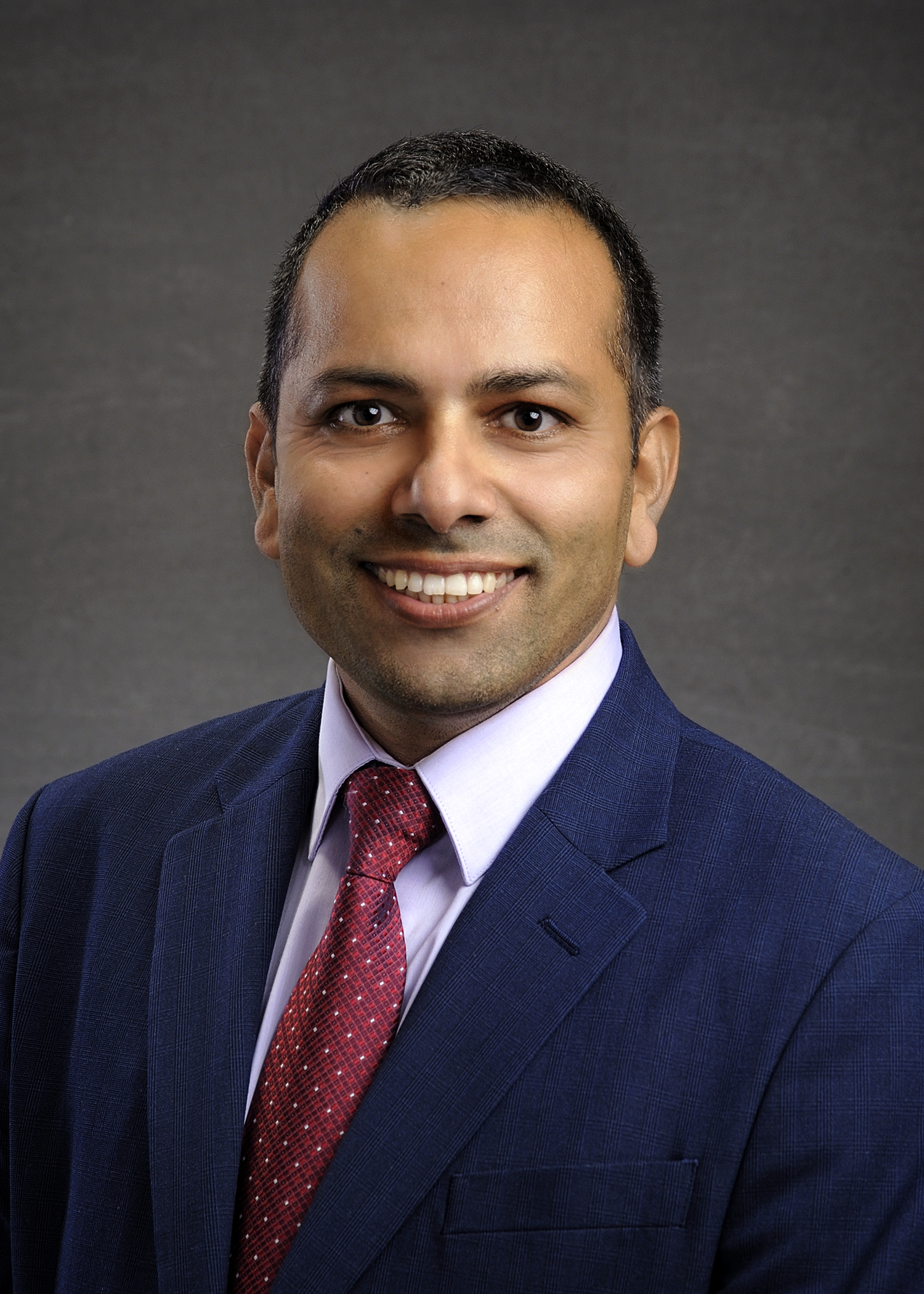
- Born: Chitwan, Nepal
- Scientific career
- Fields: Laboratory Medicine, Molecular Biology
- Institutions: University of Maryland
- Doctoral advisor: Prof Moudgil Kamal (Post-doctoral) Prof. Lee Byung-heon (biochemist)

Bodhraj Acharya is a Nepalese-born American professional, working in the field of laboratory medicine, Cell Biology and chemistry. He has received many honors, grants and travel fellowships in United States and other countries. He has published patents, abstracts and articles in the field. He had worked previously as a clinical laboratory technical director in various hospitals. He also work as Clinical Laboratory expert for various non-profit organizations.

== Prizes and honours ==
- 1997, 1999 Merit scholarship to study Medical Laboratory Technology at Institute of Medicine, Tribhuvan University
- 2005 Gallwas membership Grant, AACC
- 2005 and 2007 International travel grant, AACC
- 2006 Young Achievers Award
- 2007 International Travel Grant, Asian & Pacific Federation of Clinical Biochemistry (APFCB)
- 2008 and 2010 KNU Honors Scholarship for Graduation Study (MS and PHD)
- 2012 Featured member of AACC, interview published at AACC website
- 2013 KNU Best Publication Award
- 2014 KNU Cell-Matrix Research Institute Winter Seminar Award

== Professional membership ==
- American Association of Clinical Chemistry (AACC)
- Academy Fellow of AACC
- American Society of Clinical Pathology (ASCP)
- International Society on Thrombosis and Haemostasis (ISTH)
- Korean Society for Biochemistry and Molecular Biology

== Patents ==
- US patent 11174287B2
- US patent 10421780B2

== Book chapter ==
- Inflammation: From Molecular and Cellular Mechanisms to the Clinic, Publisher :Wiley

== Publication ==
- Acharya B, Acharya A, Gautam S, Ghimire SP, Mishra G, Parajuli N; et al. (2020). "Advances in diagnosis of Tuberculosis: an update into molecular diagnosis of Mycobacterium tuberculosis". Mol Biol Rep. 47 (5): 4065–4075. doi:10.1007/s11033-020-05413-7. PMID 32248381.
- Acharya B, Meka RR, Venkatesha SH, Lees JR, Teesalu T, Moudgil KD (2020). "A novel CNS-homing peptide for targeting neuroinflammatory lesions in experimental autoimmune encephalomyelitis". Mol Cell Probes. 51 101530. doi:10.1016/j.mcp.2020.101530. PMC 7245014. PMID 32035108.
- Meka RR, Venkatesha SH, Dudics S, Acharya B, Moudgil KD (2015). "IL-27-induced modulation of autoimmunity and its therapeutic potential". Autoimmun Rev. 14 (12): 1131–1141. doi:10.1016/j.autrev.2015.08.001. PMC 4628569. PMID 26253381.
- Venkatesha SH, Dudics S, Acharya B, Moudgil KD (2014). "Cytokine-modulating strategies and newer cytokine targets for arthritis therapy". Int J Mol Sci. 16 (1): 887–906. doi:10.3390/ijms16010887. PMC 4307281. PMID 25561237.
- Meka RR, Venkatesha SH, Acharya B, Moudgil KD (2019). "Peptide-targeted liposomal delivery of dexamethasone for arthritis therapy". Nanomedicine (Lond). 14 (11): 1455–1469. doi:10.2217/nnm-2018-0501. PMC 6613046. PMID 30938236.
- Acharya, B; Wang, K; Kim, IS; Kang, W; Moon, C; Lee, BH (2013). "In vivo imaging of myocardial cell death using a peptide probe and assessment of long-term heart function". Journal of Controlled Release. 172 (1): 367–73. doi:10.1016/j.jconrel.2013.08.294. PMID 24021357.
- Acharya, B; Chun, SY; Kim, SY; Moon, C; Shin, HI; Park, EK (2012). "Surface immobilization of MEPE peptide onto HA/β-TCP ceramic particles enhances bone regeneration and remodeling". Journal of Biomedical Materials Research Part B: Applied Biomaterials. 100 (3): 841–9. doi:10.1002/jbm.b.32648. PMID 22278974.
- Choi, YA; Lim, J; Kim, KM; Acharya, B; Cho, JY; Bae, YC; Shin, HI; Kim, SY; Park, EK (2010). "Secretome analysis of human BMSCs and identification of SMOC1 as an important ECM protein in osteoblast differentiation". Journal of Proteome Research. 9 (6): 2946–56. doi:10.1021/pr901110q. PMID 20359165.
- He, X; Bonaparte, N; Kim, S; Acharya, B; Lee, JY; Chi, L; Lee, HJ; Paik, YK; Moon, PG; Baek, MC; Lee, EK; KIM, JH; KIM, IS; Lee, BH (2012). "Enhanced delivery of T cells to tumor after chemotherapy using membrane-anchored, apoptosis-targeted peptide". Journal of Controlled Release. 162 (6): 521–8. doi:10.1016/j.jconrel.2012.07.023. PMID 22824781.
- Venkatesha, S. H.; Dudics, S; Acharya, B; Moudgil, K. D. (2014). "Cytokine-Modulating Strategies and Newer Cytokine Targets for Arthritis Therapy". International Journal of Molecular Sciences. 16 (1): 887–906. doi:10.3390/ijms16010887. PMC 4307281. PMID 25561237.
