= Tony Palmer (cyclist) =

American cyclist

Personal information
- Born: January 15, 1966 (age 60)

Cycling career
- Sport: Cycling

Tony Palmer (born January 15, 1966) is an American former cyclist. He competed in the team time trial at the 1988 Summer Olympics.
