= Jože Smole =

Yugoslav cyclist

Personal information
- Born: 29 October 1965 (age 60) Novo Mesto, Yugoslavia

Cycling career
- Sport: Cycling

Jože Smole (born 29 October 1965) is a Yugoslav former cyclist. He competed in the team time trial at the 1988 Summer Olympics.
