= Jan Karlsson (cyclist) =

Swedish cyclist

Personal information
- Born: 8 February 1966 (age 60) Falköping, Sweden

Cycling career
- Sport: Cycling
Medal record
Representing Sweden
Men's road bicycle racing
Olympic Games
| Bronze medal – third place | 1988 Seoul | Team time trial |

Jan Bengt Peter Karlsson (born 8 February 1966) is a Swedish former cyclist. He won the bronze medal in the team time trial road race along with Anders Jarl, Michel Lafis and Björn Johansson in the 1988 Summer Olympics. He also rode at the 1992 Summer Olympics and the 1996 Summer Olympics.
