= Gavin Stevens (cyclist) =

New Zealand cyclist (born 1960)

Personal information
- Born: 23 February 1960 (age 66) Auckland, New Zealand

Cycling career
- Sport: Cycling

Gavin Stevens (born 23 February 1960) is a New Zealand former cyclist. He competed in the team time trial at the 1988 Summer Olympics.
