= Bruce Keech =

Australian cyclist (born 1966)

Personal information
- Born: 8 October 1966 (age 60)

Cycling career
- Sport: Cycling

Bruce Allen Keech (born 8 October 1966) is an Australian former cyclist. He competed in the team time trial at the 1988 Summer Olympics.
