= Phil Bateman =

British cyclist

Personal information
- Born: 8 September 1962 (age 64) Leeds, England

Cycling career
- Sport: Cycling

Phil Bateman (born 8 September 1962) is a British former cyclist. He competed in the team time trial at the 1988 Summer Olympics.
