= Tongillo Road Course =

Race course in Seoul, South Korea

The Tongillo Road Course was a temporary road course that was repaired between March 1987 and August 1988. The course was located in the Tongil-ro section of Seoul between the Philippine Expeditionary Forces To Korea memorial and Munsan, located north of Seoul on the unification road, which is off exit 16 of the Seoul Ring Expressway.

During the 1988 Summer Olympics, the venue hosted the all three road cycling events. The circuit used for the individual road race was 16.4 km (10.2 mi) long and was twelve laps for men and five laps for women. For the men's road team time trial event, the circuit was 25 km (16 mi) long and required two round trips to complete the required 100 km (62 mi).

Most of the 1.665 million won spent on repairs was for road paving.
