= Haydn Trio Wien =

Austrian chamber ensemble

The Haydn Trio Wien (named after the composer Joseph Haydn) is an Austrian chamber music ensemble founded in 1964. The members studied at the Vienna Academy of Music, University of Music and Performing Arts Vienna and have been playing in the current line-up since 1968. The Piano Trio is dedicated to the faithful interpretation of works of classical music.

== Members ==
- 1964 to 1968: Walter Kamper – piano; since 1968: Heinz Medjimorec – piano.
- Walther Schulz – violoncello (founding member)
- Michael Schnitzler – violin (founding member)
