= Jan Schur =

East German cyclist

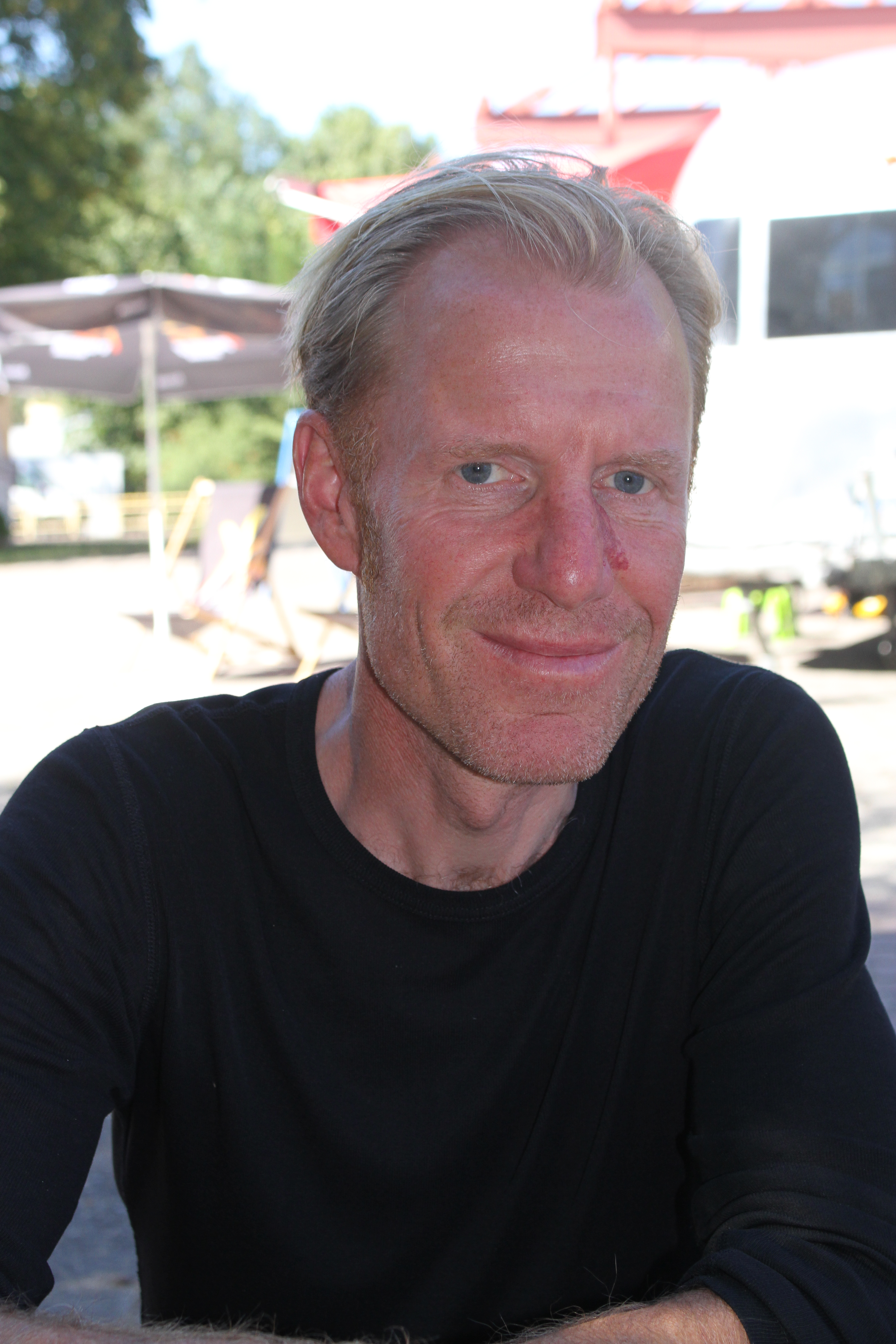
- Jan Schur in 2016

Personal information
- Full name: Jan Schur
- Born: 27 November 1962 (age 63) Leipzig, East Germany

Cycling career
- Sport: Cycling
- Disciplines: Road and track
- Role: Rider

Professional teams
- 1990–1991: Chateau d'Ax–Salotti
- 1992–1994: Motorola
Medal record
Representing East Germany
Men's road bicycle racing
Olympic Games
Gold medal – first place	1988 Seoul	Team time trial
World Championships
Gold medal – first place	1989 Chambéry	Team time trial

Jan Schur (born 27 November 1962) is a retired track cyclist and road cyclist from East Germany, who represented his native country at the 1988 Summer Olympics in Seoul, South Korea. There he won the gold medal in the men's team time trial, alongside Uwe Ampler, Mario Kummer, and Maik Landsmann. He is an alumnus of Leipzig University, where he studied sports science.

Schur was a professional road cyclist from 1990 to 1994. His father Täve Schur (born 1931) was also a famous cyclist.

== Major results ==
1982
1st Stage 7 Tour de Pologne
1987
3rd Overall International Tour of Hellas

1st Stage 7

4th Overall Tour of Sweden

1st Stage 6b (ITT)

1988
1st Team time trial, Summer Olympics (with Uwe Ampler, Mario Kummer and Maik Landsmann)
1st Stage 4 GP Tell
3rd Overall Tour du Vaucluse

1st Stage 1

1989
1st Team time trial, UCI Road World Championships (with Falk Boden, Mario Kummer and Maik Landsmann)
1st Stage 7 International Tour of Hellas
1990
6th Tour of Flanders
1994
10th Nice-Alassio
