= Igor Sumnikov =

Belarusian cyclist

Personal information
- Born: 29 September 1966 (age 60) Minsk, Byelorussian SSR, Soviet Union

Cycling career
- Sport: Cycling

Igor Sumnikov (born 29 September 1966) is a Soviet former cyclist. He competed in the team time trial at the 1988 Summer Olympics. In 1984 Sumnikov was first in the World Championship, Road, 75 km TTT Juniors. His best results are 2x Stage Tour du Vaucluse (1987).
