= Craig Connell (cyclist) =

New Zealand cyclist (born 1967)

Personal information
- Full name: Craig Martin Connell
- Born: 7 September 1967 (age 59) Auckland, New Zealand

Cycling career
- Sport: Cycling

Craig Martin Connell (born 7 September 1967) is a New Zealand former cyclist. He competed in the team pursuit event at the 1988 Summer Olympics. In 1990, Connell was awarded the New Zealand 1990 Commemoration Medal.
