= Yu Byeong-heon =

South Korean cyclist

Personal information
- Born: 17 April 1964 (age 62)

Cycling career
- Sport: Cycling

Yu Byeong-heon (born 17 April 1964) is a South Korean former cyclist. He competed in the team time trial at the 1988 Summer Olympics.
