= Lorenzo Maggioni =

Italian Football Referee

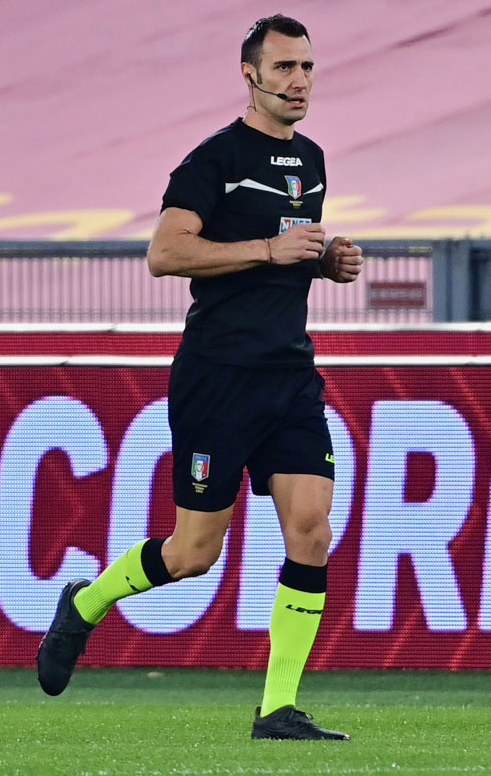
- Born: 12 March 1984 (age 42); Merate, LC, Italy
- Other occupation: Entrepreneur

Domestic
Years	League	Role
2010–2014	Serie D	Referee
2014–2018	Serie C	Referee
2018-2023	Serie A	Referee
2023-	Serie A	VAR

International
Years	League	Role
2022-2023	Kypello Kyprou	Referee

Lorenzo Maggioni (born 12 March 1984) is a professional Italian football referee who referees in the Italian Serie A and Serie B. From the season 2023-24 he has been included in the dedicated list of the Italian Video Assistant Referee.

== Career ==
Lorenzo Maggioni become a referee in 2002 near Lecco for the Italian Referee Association. After the classic iter in the minor leagues, in the 2009-2010 season he comes at the Interregional Referees Commission and in the following season at the National Referees Commission of Serie D where he spent four years. In the summer of 2014 he was promoted to the refereeing staff of Serie C, the third Italian championship.

He made his debut in third League on 7 September 2014 in the Pro Piacenza-Forlì match (3-0). The last direction in Serie C was for the Playoff Semifinal return between Catania and Siena on 10 June 2018, won by the Tuscan club on penalties. After 4 years in third League and 68 official marches referred, on 30 June 2018 he was promoted to Serie B, the second Italian football League

The absolute debut in Serie B was on 2 September 2018 at the Adriatico stadium for the match between Pescara-Livorno (2-1). After only 11 official directions in Serie B, 4 April 2019, he made his debut in Serie A for the match between Sassuolo and Chievo (4-0)

From 1 September 2020 he was included in the best 50 Italian referees which referee both in Serie A and in Serie B. The last match in his career was on 29 May 2023 between AEL Limassol-Doxa in the First Division of the Kypello Kyprou, the Cypriot Championship

On 3 July 2023 Maggioni retired as referee on the pitch from the Serie A with a total of 7 directions in Serie A, 61 in Serie B and 4 in the Italian Cup. He has been immediately included in the list of the Video Match Official (VMO) which works as Video Assistant Referee for the Serie A and Serie B matches.

== Personal life ==
When he is not refereeing, Maggioni works as an entrepreneur.
