= David Spears =

Canadian cyclist

Personal information
- Born: 21 December 1963 (age 62) Sudbury, Ontario, Canada

Cycling career
- Sport: Cycling

David Spears (born 21 December 1963) is a Canadian former cyclist. He competed in the team time trial at the 1988 Summer Olympics.
