= Éric Heulot =

French cyclist

Personal information
- Born: 9 October 1962 (age 64) Rennes, France

Cycling career
- Sport: Cycling

Éric Heulot (born 9 October 1962) is a French former cyclist. He competed in the team time trial at the 1988 Summer Olympics.
