= Veit Krenn =

German pathologist and sculptor

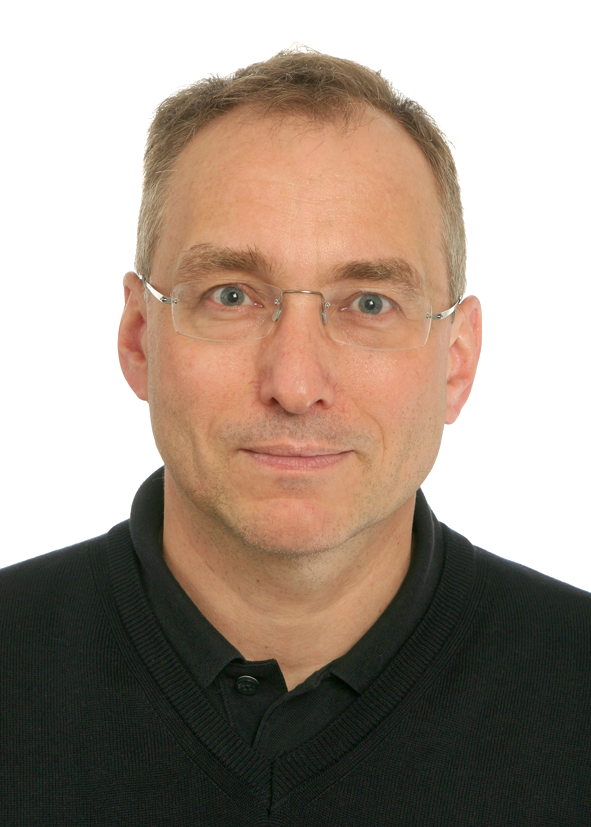
Veit Krenn, 2013

Veit Krenn (born November 3, 1960, in Philadelphia, Pennsylvania, United States) is a German pathologist and sculptor of Austrian origin.

== Life ==
Veit Krenn spent his childhood partially in Florida but mostly in Vienna. He earned his Dr. med. univ. at the Medical University of Vienna on November 30, 1987, with his work about Migration und Determination myogener Zellen im Embryo.

From 1988 to 1992 he worked as a medical intern at the Institute of Histology and Embryology in Vienna. Afterwards he worked as an assistant professor at the Institute of Pathology at the University of Würzburg until 2000. At the same university he obtained his medical doctorate with his work Das Expressionsprofil von Makrophagenantigenen, Adhäsionsmolekülen und Chemokinen der Epitheloidzelle in der granulomatösen und kleinherdigen Epitheloidzellreaktion on November 21, 1997, and on June 26, 2000, he received his Habilitation for his work in Morphologische und molekulare Analyse synovialer B-Zellen in der chronischen Synovialitits: Ein Beitrag zum Pathogeneseverständnis von Arthrose und rheumatoider Arthritis.

From 2000 to 2005, Krenn worked as an associate professor at the infection pathology and as a chief resident at the Institute of Pathology at the Charité in Berlin. Since 2005 Krenn has been working at the MVZ für Histologie, Zytologie und Molekulare Diagnostik Trier in Trier, Germany.

Krenn is married to Anke Krenn, a psychiatrist, and has three children.

== Field of work ==
Together with colleagues at the Charité, Krenn developed the Synovitis-Score, which is a score to classify rheumatic and nonrheumatic joint diseases.

In interdisciplinary collaboration Krenn developed the advanced consensus classification for periprosthetic membrane, which allows a classification in six subtypes and particle identification. based on histopathological criteria Veit Krenn contributed by Histopathology due to clarification of NETosis in context of diverse inflammatory tissue reactions.

As an artist Krenn forms sculptures, which are inspired by anatomic and pathological shapes.

== Awards ==
- 1989 - 1991: Erwin-Schrödinger-Scholarship
- 2017: DGORh's Arthur-Vick-Preis for the development of the Synovitis-Score
- 2018: OUP Award for the value of Histopathology in musculoskeletal und periprosthetic joint disease diagnostics
- 2018: DGOOC's Themistocles-Gluck-Award 2018 for the development of a histopathological classification system for standardized diagnostics

== Literature ==
- Isabel Atzl: Zeitzeugen Charité: Arbeitswelten des Instituts für Pathologie 1952 – 2005. LIT Verlag Berlin-Hamburg-Münster, 2006, ISBN 3-8258-9522-X, S. 134f.
- Krenn V., Rüther W (Hrsg.):., Pathologie des Bewegungsapparates, De Gruyter ISBN 978-3-11-028596-3
- Hempfling H., Krenn V., Schadenbeurteilung am Bewegungssystem, Band 1: Grundlagen, Gelenkflächen, Osteonekrosen, Epiphysen, Impingment, Synovialis, De Gruyter ISBN 978-3-11-028322-8
- Hempfling H., Krenn V., Schadenbeurteilung am Bewegungssystem, Band 2: Meniskus, Diskus, Bandscheiben, Labrum, Ligamente, Sehnen, De Gruyter ISBN 978-3-11-029738-6
- Hempfling H., Krenn V., Schadenbeurteilung am Bewegungssystem, Band 3: Femoropatellargelenk, Wertigkeit der histopathologischen Diagnostik, Neurologie, Psychiatrie, De Gruyter ISBN 978-3-11-054285-1
- H. Hempfling, V. Krenn: Schadenbeurteilung am Bewegungssystem. Band 3: Femoropatellargelenk Wertigkeit der histopathologischen Diagnostik, Neurologie, Psychiatrie. De Gruyter, ISBN 978-3-11-054285-1
- Krenn. V, Perino G., Histological Diagnosis of Implant-associated Pathologies, Springer ISBN 978-3-662-54204-0
