= Roberto Maggioni =

Italian cyclist

Personal information
- Born: 5 March 1968 (age 58) Lecco, Italy

Cycling career
- Sport: Cycling

Roberto Maggioni (born 5 March 1968) is an Italian former cyclist. He competed in the team time trial at the 1988 Summer Olympics.
