= Harry Lodge =

British cyclist

Personal information
- Full name: Harry Lodge
- Born: 23 September 1967 (age 59) Salisbury, Wiltshire, England

Cycling career
- Sport: Cycling
- Discipline: Road
- Role: Rider
- Rider type: Endurance

Amateur team
- Chiltern Road Club

Professional teams
- 1990: La William - Saltos
- 1991: Colstrop - Isoglass
- 1992: Tulip Computers
- 1993: Collstrop - Assur Carpets
- 1994–1995: Amore e Vita
- 1997: Ipso- Euroclean
- 1999–2000: Amore e Vita
- 2001–2002: Flanders

Harry Lodge (born 23 September 1967) was a professional English road racing cyclist from Salisbury, Wiltshire. He began cycling with the Chiltern Road Club before becoming a first category rider and gaining a place on the national squad. He was then selected to ride in the team time trial at the 1988 Summer Olympics.

Lodge lived in Italy for 13 years before returning to the UK. In December 2006 he started Halo Sports Management, of which he is managing director. The company distributes Jollywear clothing from Italy. In 2007 and 2008 Lodge managed the British cycling team, KFS Special Vehicles - Sunday Bicycles.
