= Mario Kummer =

German cyclist

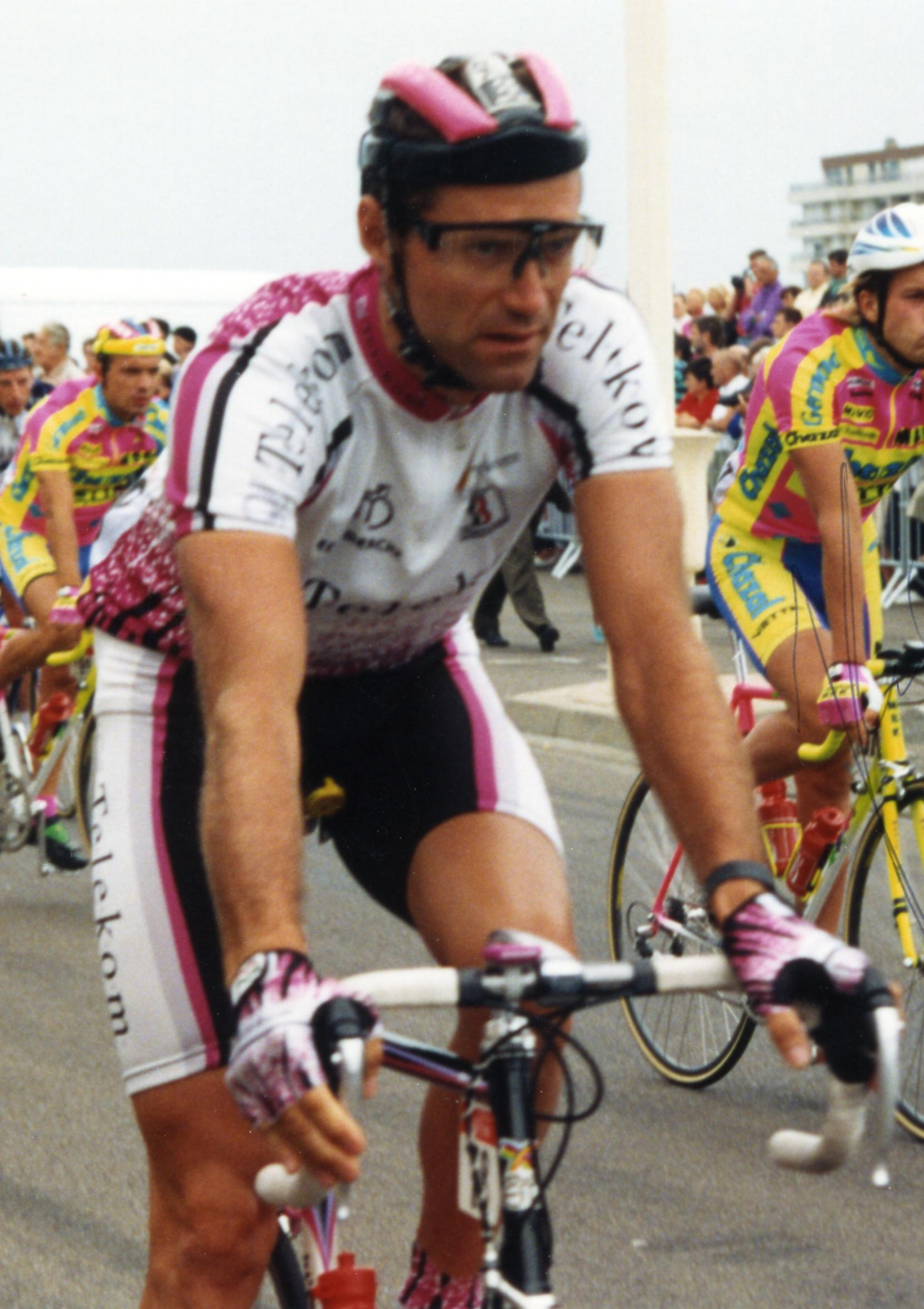
- Kummer at the 1993 Tour de France

Personal information
- Full name: Mario Kummer
- Born: 6 May 1962 (age 64) Suhl, Thuringia, East Germany

Cycling career
- Sport: Cycling
- Disciplines: Road and track
- Role: Rider

Professional teams
- 1990–1991: Chateau d'Ax–Salotti
- 1992: PDM–Ultima–Concorde
- 1993–1997: Team Telekom

Managerial team
- 2007: Astana
Medal record
Event	1st	2nd	3rd
Summer Olympics	1	0	0
Road World Championships	2	0	1
Total	3	0	1
Representing East Germany
Men's track cycling
Olympic Games
Gold medal – first place	1988 Seoul	Team time trial
World Championships
Gold medal – first place	1981 Prague	Team time trial
Gold medal – first place	1989 Chambéry	Team time trial
Bronze medal – third place	1986 Colorado Springs	Team time trial

Mario Kummer (born 6 May 1962) is a retired track and road racing cyclist from East Germany, who represented his native country at the 1988 Summer Olympics in Seoul, South Korea. There he won the gold medal in the men's team time trial, alongside Uwe Ampler, Jan Schur and Maik Landsmann. He was a professional road cyclist from 1990 to 1998, and afterwards became a cycling manager, managing Astana for the 2007 racing year.

== Major results ==
1983
Troféu Joaquim Agostinho

1st Stages 1 & 6

1st Stage 8 Okolo Slovenska
10th Overall Tour de l'Avenir
1984
1st Overall Tour de Normandie
1988
1st Team time trial, Summer Olympics (with Uwe Ampler, Jan Schur and Maik Landsmann)
1989
10th Overall Circuit Cycliste Sarthe
1990
3rd Firenze–Pistoia
10th Overall GP du Midi-Libre
1991
1st Stage 3 Giro di Puglia
8th Firenze–Pistoia
1994
8th Japan Cup Cycle Road Race
1997
5th HEW Cyclassics
