= Milan Křen =

Czech cyclist

Personal information
- Born: 29 May 1965 (age 61) Ústí nad Orlicí, Czechoslovakia

Cycling career
- Sport: Cycling

Milan Křen (born 29 May 1965) is a Czech former cyclist. He competed in the team time trial at the 1988 Summer Olympics.
