= Vladimír Hrůza =

Czech cyclist

Personal information
- Born: 6 February 1960 (age 66) Jihlava, Czechoslovakia

Cycling career
- Sport: Cycling

Vladimír Hrůza (born 6 February 1960) is a Czech former cyclist. He competed in the team time trial at the 1988 Summer Olympics.
