= Piedras Blancas National Park =

National park in Costa Rica

- IUCN category II (national park)
- Piedras Blancas National Park area
- Location: Puntarenas Province, Costa Rica
- Nearest city: La Gamba
- Coordinates: 8°42′00″N 83°15′40″W
- Area: 34,642 acres (14,019 ha)
- Established: 17 July 1991
- Governing body: National System of Conservation Areas (SINAC)
- Location in Costa Rica

Piedras Blancas National Park is a national park part of the Osa Conservation Area. It is found in the Puntarenas Province of southern Costa Rica near the town of La Gamba. It protects rainforests and beaches near the Golfo Dulce on the Pacific Coast. It used to operate as part of the Corcovado National Park called the Esquinas Sector from 1991 before becoming a separate park in 1999. Until the mid-1990s, much of the forest in the park was severely endangered by logging.

The rugged mountains and watersheds of the Esquinas and Piedras Blancas rivers are covered in dense evergreen forest that is home to a number of rare tropical trees and the habitat of many species of birds, mammals and reptiles. Hunting has been a problem, but the number of park rangers was increased from 6 to 16 between 2005 and 2007, and poaching has decreased.

Some of the park has remained in private hands, however a charitable organization Regenwald der Osterreicher (Rainforest of the Austrians) has been raising funds and purchasing these, which up to 2008 had moved 37 km^{2} (14 mi^{2}) of land in the area into public ownership. The Costa Rican government, the hydroelectric company Tenaska (carbon offset joint implementation), The Nature Conservancy and the Gordon and Betty Moore foundation have also purchased land in Piedras Blancas, bringing the total protected area within the park to more than 80%.

== Zoology ==
=== Mammals ===
Austrian researchers studying the mammals of Piedras Blancas NP in 2003 and 2004 compiled a list of 96 species sighted or caught in camera traps. The 14 species of carnivores include raccoons, coati, kinkajou, olingo, skunks, grison, tayra and five species of cats (jaguar, ocelot, margay, jaguarundi and puma). It is, however, highly unlikely that tourists will encounter a wildcat as they are elusive and nocturnal. Two-toed sloths are rare in the Esquinas forest but can be found in the coastal areas around Golfito. Around 20 years ago, the giant anteater was seen for the last time by local hunters, but it is extinct today. The northern tamandua has been sighted near Esquinas Lodge and the silky anteater was recorded in the mangroves near Golfito.

White-faced capuchin and squirrel monkeys are often seen in the lodge garden, whereas howler monkeys are usually heard and seen on the Golfo Dulce coast and spider monkeys have been regularly sighted since 2006. Five species of American opossums have been recorded, including the Mexican mouse, the gray four-eyed, and the common opossum. Rodents include the agouti, paca and several species of mice, squirrels and rats.

With 53 different species, bats are the richest mammal group in Piedras Blancas NP. Most of the species are fruit eaters like Artibeus watsoni and Carollia perspicillata. The vampire bat is a real blood feeding animal and was found foraging in open habitats near La Gamba.

=== Amphibians and reptiles ===
Several scientists and students have undertaken studies in Piedras Blancas National Park, using La Gamba Field Station as a base for their investigative trips. They have produced a booklet with descriptions of 37 amphibian and 42 reptile species of the Esquinas rainforest. You are likely to encounter spectacularly colored frogs such as the red-eyed leaf frog or poison-arrow frogs, tree frogs, glass frogs, rain frogs and cane toads. The nocturnal concert of frog calls at Esquinas Lodge is unforgettable. Basilisks and iguanas frequent the streams, anole lizards can be seen in the garden, and geckos can be seen chasing insects in the main lodge building at nighttime. The most common and most dangerous snake is the fer-de-lance, but coral snakes, vine snakes, boa constrictors and pit vipers are seen occasionally. Spectacled caimans live in the ponds, and American crocodiles can be seen in larger rivers and mangrove swamps.
