= Lee Byung-heon (biochemist) =

South Korean biochemist

Lee Byung-Heon
- Born: South Korea
- Scientific career
- Fields: Biochemistry, Molecular Biology
- Institutions: Kyungpook National University

Korean name
- Hangul: 이병헌
- RR: I Byeongheon
- MR: I Pyŏnghŏn

Lee Byung-heon (Korean: 이병헌) is a professor of biochemistry and cell biology in the school of medicine at Kyungpook National University (KNU), South Korea. He received his M.D. license from Korean Medical Association in 1989. He received his B.S. from the school of medicine, KNU, in 1989, and his M.S. and Ph.D. in biochemistry from KNU in 1991 and 1995. He was an assistant professor in the school of medicine at Dongguk University in 1996–2001 and a visiting investigator in the Sanford-Burnham Medical Research Institute, La Jolla, United States, in 2001–2003. He joined KNU in 2003. He is currently a member of the Korean Society for Biochemistry and Molecular Biology, the American Association for Cancer Research, and the American Society of Molecular Imaging. His main research interest is "discovery of tissue-specific homing peptides using phage display and their applications to molecular imaging and targeted therapy". He is currently carrying out projects for the identification of homing peptides to tumor and atherosclerotic plaque and of phosphatidylserine- and blood clotting factor XIIIa-specific peptide ligands. He has published over 30 peer-reviewed papers, book chapters, and review articles. He has also filed several patents.

== Academic career ==
- March 1989 – February 1993: Teaching assistant, department of biochemistry, school of medicine, KNU, South Korea
- May 1993 – April 1996: Primary physician, Public Health Center of Changyeong-gun, Gyeongju, South Korea
- March 1996 – February 1998: Instructor, department of biochemistry, school of medicine, Dongguk University, Gyeongju, South Korea
- June 1997 – August 1997: Visiting investigator, MD Anderson Cancer Center, Houston, Texas, United States
- October 1998 – February 2002: Assistant professor, department of biochemistry, school of medicine, Dongguk University, Gyeongju, South Korea
- February 2001 – July 2003: Visiting investigator, The Burnham Institute for Medical Research, San Diego, United States
- August 2003 – present: Professor, department of biochemistry and cell biology, school of medicine, KNU, South Korea; associate dean for research and international programs, school of medicine, KNU, South Korea

== Professional memberships ==
- 1989–present: Korean Society of Molecular Biology and Biochemistry
- 1990–present: Korean Society of Molecular Cell Biology
- 2003–present: American Association for Cancer Research
- 2005–present: American Society of Molecular Imaging

== Research interests ==
Phage display selection of tissue-specific homing peptides and biomarker-sensing peptides: Phage peptide display is a powerful tool for identifying peptides that selectively bind to a target protein or cells (see figure below). Using this technology, laboratory has identified diverse homing peptides, including the bladder tumor-targeting peptide, atherosclerotic plaque-homing peptide, and IL-4 receptor-binding peptide. She also have been working on selecting peptides that specifically recognize or sense biomarker proteins of cardiovascular diseases and cancers.

== Recent publications ==
- Acharya, B; Wang, K; Kim, IS; Kang, W; Moon, C; Lee, BH (2013). "In vivo imaging of myocardial cell death using a peptide probe and assessment of long-term heart function". Journal of Controlled Release. 172 (1): 367–73. doi:10.1016/j.jconrel.2013.08.294. PMID 24021357.
- Jeon, J. O.; Kim, S.; Choi, E.; Shin, K.; Cha, K.; So, I. S.; Kim, S. J.; Jun, E.; Kim, D.; Ahn, H. J.; Lee, B. H.; Lee, S. H.; Kim, I. S. (2013). "Designed Nanocage Displaying Ligand-Specific Peptide Bunches for High Affinity and Biological Activity". ACS Nano. 7 (9): 7462–71. doi:10.1021/nn403184u. PMID 23927443.
- Lee, B. H.; Kwon, T. H. (2013). "Application of Phage Display for Ligand Peptidomics to Identify Peptide Ligands Binding to AQP2-Expressing Membrane Fractions". The Low Molecular Weight Proteome. Methods in Molecular Biology. Vol. 1023. pp. 181–9. doi:10.1007/978-1-4614-7209-4_12. ISBN 978-1-4614-7167-7. PMID 23765627.
- Bae, S. M.; Kim, J. H.; Chung, S. W.; Byun, Y.; Kim, S. Y.; Lee, B. H.; Kim, I. S.; Park, R. W. (2013). "An apoptosis-homing peptide-conjugated low molecular weight heparin-taurocholate conjugate with antitumor properties". Biomaterials. 34 (8): 2077–2086. doi:10.1016/j.biomaterials.2012.11.020. PMID 23245333.
- Mentlein, R.; Von Kolszynski, M.; Sprang, R.; Lucius, R. (1990). "Proline-specific proteases in cultivated neuronal and glial cells". Brain Research. 527 (1): 159–162. doi:10.1016/0006-8993(90)91076-S. PMID 2282478. S2CID 10367361.
- Nam, J. -O.; Son, H. -N.; Jun, E.; Cha, K.; Lee, B. -H.; Park, R. -W.; Kim, I. -S. (2012). "FAS1 Domain Protein Inhibits VEGF165-Induced Angiogenesis by Targeting the Interaction between VEGFR-2 and v 3 Integrin". Molecular Cancer Research. 10 (8): 1010–1020. doi:10.1158/1541-7786.MCR-11-0600. PMID 22710795.
- Ha, Y. S.; Lee, H. Y.; An, G. I.; Kim, J.; Kwak, W.; Lee, E. J.; Lee, S. M.; Lee, B. H.; Kim, I. S.; Belay, T.; Lee, W.; Ahn, B. C.; Lee, J.; Yoo, J. (2012). "Synthesis and evaluation of a radioiodinated bladder cancer specific peptide". Bioorganic & Medicinal Chemistry. 20 (14): 4330–5. doi:10.1016/j.bmc.2012.05.049. PMID 22705190.
- Kim, J. H.; Bae, S. M.; Na, M. H.; Shin, H.; Yang, Y. J.; Min, K. H.; Choi, K. Y.; Kim, K.; Park, R. W.; Kwon, I. C.; Lee, B. H.; Hoffman, A. S.; Kim, I. S. (2012). "Facilitated intracellular delivery of peptide-guided nanoparticles in tumor tissues". Journal of Controlled Release. 157 (3): 493–499. doi:10.1016/j.jconrel.2011.09.070. PMID 21945679.
- Lee, G. Y.; Kim, J. H.; Oh, G. T.; Lee, B. H.; Kwon, I. C.; Kim, I. S. (2011). "Molecular targeting of atherosclerotic plaques by a stabilin-2-specific peptide ligand". Journal of Controlled Release. 155 (2): 211–217. doi:10.1016/j.jconrel.2011.07.010. PMID 21781994.
- Wang, K.; Na, M. H.; Hoffman, A. S.; Shim, G.; Han, S. E.; Oh, Y. K.; Kwon, I. C.; Kim, I. S.; Lee, B. H. (2011). "In situ dose amplification by apoptosis-targeted drug delivery". Journal of Controlled Release. 154 (3): 214–217. doi:10.1016/j.jconrel.2011.06.043. PMID 21763738.
- Lee, M. J.; Wang, K.; Kim, I. S.; Lee, B. H.; Han, H. S. (2011). "Molecular Imaging of Cell Death in an Experimental Model of Parkinson's Disease with a Novel Apoptosis-Targeting Peptide". Molecular Imaging and Biology. 14 (2): 147–155. doi:10.1007/s11307-011-0497-z. PMID 21567253. S2CID 2675055.
- He, X.; Na, M. H.; Kim, J. S.; Lee, G. Y.; Park, J. Y.; Hoffman, A. S.; Nam, J. O.; Han, S. E.; Sim, G. Y.; Oh, Y. K.; Kim, I. S.; Lee, B. H. (2011). "A Novel Peptide Probe for Imaging and Targeted Delivery of Liposomal Doxorubicin to Lung Tumor". Molecular Pharmaceutics. 8 (2): 430–438. doi:10.1021/mp100266g. PMID 21222482.
- Mun, G. I.; Kim, I. -S.; Lee, B. -H.; Boo, Y. C. (2010). "Endothelial Argininosuccinate Synthetase 1 Regulates Nitric Oxide Production and Monocyte Adhesion under Static and Laminar Shear Stress Conditions". Journal of Biological Chemistry. 286 (4): 2536–2542. doi:10.1074/jbc.M110.180489. PMC 3024748. PMID 21106532.
- Wang, K.; Purushotham, S.; Lee, J. Y.; Na, M. H.; Park, H.; Oh, S. J.; Park, R. W.; Park, J. Y.; Lee, E.; Cho, B. C.; Song, M. N.; Baek, M. C.; Kwak, W.; Yoo, J.; Hoffman, A. S.; Oh, Y. K.; Kim, I. S.; Lee, B. H. (2010). "In vivo imaging of tumor apoptosis using histone H1-targeting peptide". Journal of Controlled Release. 148 (3): 283–291. doi:10.1016/j.jconrel.2010.09.010. PMID 20869411.
- Lee, E. B.; Jeon, H. S.; Yoo, S. S.; Choi, Y. Y.; Kang, H. G.; Cho, S.; Cha, S. I.; Choi, J. E.; Park, T. I.; Lee, B. H.; Park, R. W.; Kim, I. S.; Kang, Y. M.; Kim, C. H.; Jheon, S.; Jung, T. H.; Park, J. Y. (2010). "Polymorphisms in Apoptosis-Related Genes and Survival of Patients with Early-Stage Non-Small-Cell Lung Cancer". Annals of Surgical Oncology. 17 (10): 2608–2618. doi:10.1245/s10434-010-1082-4. PMID 20422457. S2CID 13354091.
- Jesudasan, M.; John, T. J.; Gupta, B. L.; Bhujwala, R. A.; Shriniwas (1990). "Multiresistant Salmonella typhi in India". Lancet. 336 (8709): 252. doi:10.1016/0140-6736(90)91783-7. PMID 1973803. S2CID 34896690.
- Hong, H. Y.; Lee, H. Y.; Kwak, W.; Yoo, J.; Na, M. H.; So, I. S.; Kwon, T. H.; Park, H. S.; Huh, S.; Oh, G. T.; Kwon, I. C.; Kim, I. S.; Lee, B. H. (2008). "Phage display selection of peptides that home to atherosclerotic plaques: IL-4 receptor as a candidate target in atherosclerosis". Journal of Cellular and Molecular Medicine. 12 (5b): 2003–2014. doi:10.1111/j.1582-4934.2008.00189.x. PMC 4506166. PMID 19012727.
- Hong, H. Y.; Choi, J. S.; Kim, Y. J.; Lee, H. Y.; Kwak, W.; Yoo, J.; Lee, J. T.; Kwon, T. H.; Kim, I. S.; Han, H. S.; Lee, B. H. (2008). "Detection of apoptosis in a rat model of focal cerebral ischemia using a homing peptide selected from in vivo phage display". Journal of Controlled Release. 131 (3): 167–172. doi:10.1016/j.jconrel.2008.07.020. PMID 18692101.
- Thapa, N; Hong, HY; Sangeetha, P; Kim, IS; Yoo, J; Rhee, K; Oh, GT; Kwon, IC; Lee, BH (2008). "Identification of a peptide ligand recognizing dysfunctional endothelial cells for targeting atherosclerosis". Journal of Controlled Release. 131 (1): 27–33. doi:10.1016/j.jconrel.2008.07.013. PMID 18680772.
- Kwon, MK; Nam, JO; Park, RW; Lee, BH; Park, JY; Byun, YR; Kim, SY; Kwon, IC; Kim, IS (2008). "Antitumor effect of a transducible fusogenic peptide releasing multiple proapoptotic peptides by caspase-3". Molecular Cancer Therapeutics. 7 (6): 1514–1522. doi:10.1158/1535-7163.MCT-07-2009. PMID 18566222. S2CID 15515007.
- Lee, Y. -J.; Choi, H. -J.; Lim, J. -S.; Earm, J. -H.; Lee, B. -H.; Kim, I. -S.; Frokiaer, J.; Nielsen, S.; Kwon, T. -H. (2008). "A novel method of ligand peptidomics to identify peptide ligands binding to AQP2-expressing plasma membranes and intracellular vesicles of rat kidney". AJP: Renal Physiology. 295 (1): F300–F309. doi:10.1152/ajprenal.00006.2008. PMID 18480184.
- Nam, J. O.; Jung, M. Y.; Thapa, N.; Lee, B. H.; Park, R. W.; Kim, I. S. (2008). "T-CAM, a fastatin-FIII 9-10 fusion protein, potently enhances anti-angiogenic and anti-tumor activity αvβ3 and α5β1 integrins". Experimental & Molecular Medicine. 40 (2): 196–207. doi:10.3858/emm.2008.40.2.196. PMC 2679300. PMID 18446058.
- Thapa, N.; Kim, S.; So, I. S.; Lee, B. H.; Kwon, I. C.; Choi, K.; Kim, I. S. (2008). "Discovery of a phosphatidylserine-recognizing peptide and its utility in molecular imaging of tumour apoptosis". Journal of Cellular and Molecular Medicine. 12 (5a): 1649–1660. doi:10.1111/j.1582-4934.2008.00305.x. PMC 3918081. PMID 18363834.
- Thapa, N.; Lee, B. H.; Kim, I. S. (2007). "TGFBIp/βig-h3 protein: A versatile matrix molecule induced by TGF-β". The International Journal of Biochemistry & Cell Biology. 39 (12): 2183–2194. doi:10.1016/j.biocel.2007.06.004. PMID 17659994.
- Park, S. -H.; Choi, M. -J.; Song, I. -K.; Choi, S. -Y.; Nam, J. -O.; Kim, C. -D.; Lee, B. -H.; Park, R. -W.; Park, K. M.; Kim, Y. -J.; Kim, I. -S.; Kwon, T. -H.; Kim, Y. -L. (2007). "Erythropoietin Decreases Renal Fibrosis in Mice with Ureteral Obstruction: Role of Inhibiting TGF-beta-Induced Epithelial-to-Mesenchymal Transition". Journal of the American Society of Nephrology. 18 (5): 1497–1507. doi:10.1681/ASN.2005080866. PMID 17389738.
- Lee, S. -M.; Lee, E. -J.; Hong, H. -Y.; Kwon, M. -K.; Kwon, T. -H.; Choi, J. -Y.; Park, R. -W.; Kwon, T. -G.; Yoo, E. -S.; Yoon, G. -S.; Kim, I. -S.; Ruoslahti, E.; Lee, B. -H. (2007). "Targeting Bladder Tumor Cells in vivo and in the Urine with a Peptide Identified by Phage Display". Molecular Cancer Research. 5 (1): 11–19. doi:10.1158/1541-7786.MCR-06-0069. PMID 17259343.
- Lee, B. H.; Bae, J. S.; Park, R. W.; Kim, J. E.; Park, J. Y.; Kim, I. S. (2006). "Βig-h3 triggers signaling pathways mediating adhesion and migration of vascular smooth muscle cells through αvβ5 integrin". Experimental & Molecular Medicine. 38 (2): 153–161. doi:10.1038/emm.2006.19. PMID 16672769.
- Kim, Y. J.; Kim, H. N.; Park, E. K.; Lee, B. H.; Ryoo, H. M.; Kim, S. Y.; Kim, I. S.; Stein, J. L.; Lian, J. B.; Stein, G. S.; Van Wijnen, A. J.; Choi, J. Y. (2006). "The bone-related Zn finger transcription factor Osterix promotes proliferation of mesenchymal cells". Gene. 366 (1): 145–151. doi:10.1016/j.gene.2005.08.021. PMID 16314050.
- Lee, B. H.; Ruoslahti, E. (2005). "Α5β1 integrin stimulates Bcl-2 expression and cell survival through Akt, focal adhesion kinase, and Ca2+/calmodulin-dependent protein kinase IV". Journal of Cellular Biochemistry. 95 (6): 1214–1223. doi:10.1002/jcb.20488. PMID 15962308. S2CID 85628471.
- Nam, J. -O.; Jeong, H. W.; Lee, B. H.; Park, R. W.; Kim, I. S. (2005). "Regulation of Tumor Angiogenesis by Fastatin, the Fourth FAS1 Domain of ig-h3, via v 3 Integrin". Cancer Research. 65 (10): 4153–4161. doi:10.1158/0008-5472.CAN-04-2705. PMID 15899806.
- Lee, S. J.; Jeon, H. S.; Jang, J. S.; Park, S. H.; Lee, G. Y.; Lee, B. H.; Kim, C. H.; Kang, Y. M.; Lee, W. K.; Kam, S.; Park, R. W.; Kim, I. S.; Cho, Y. L.; Jung, T. H.; Park, J. Y. (2004). "DNMT3B polymorphisms and risk of primary lung cancer". Carcinogenesis. 26 (2): 403–409. doi:10.1093/carcin/bgh307. PMID 15528220.
- Park, S. W.; Bae, J. S.; Kim, K. S.; Park, S. H.; Lee, B. H.; Choi, J. Y.; Park, J. Y.; Ha, S. W.; Kim, Y. L.; Kwon, T. H.; Kim, I. S.; Park, R. W. (2004). "Beta ig-h3 promotes renal proximal tubular epithelial cell adhesion, migration and proliferation through the interaction with α3β1 integrin". Experimental & Molecular Medicine. 36 (3): 211–219. doi:10.1038/emm.2004.29. PMID 15272232.
- Lee, S. H.; Bae, J. S.; Park, S. H.; Lee, B. H.; Park, R. W.; Choi, J. Y.; Park, J. Y.; Ha, S. W.; Kim, Y. L.; Kwon, T. H.; Kim, I. S. (2003). "Expression of TGF-beta-induced matrix protein betaig-h3 is up-regulated in the diabetic rat kidney and human proximal tubular epithelial cells treated with high glucose". Kidney International. 64 (3): 1012–1021. doi:10.1046/j.1523-1755.2003.00158.x. PMID 12911551.
- Nam, J. -O.; Kim, J. E.; Jeong, H. W.; Lee, S. J.; Lee, B. H.; Choi, J. Y.; Park, R. W.; Park, J. Y.; Kim, I. S. (2003). "Identification of the alphavbeta3 integrin-interacting motif of betaig-h3 and its anti-angiogenic effect". Journal of Biological Chemistry. 278 (28): 25902–25909. doi:10.1074/jbc.M300358200. PMID 12704192.
- Kim, J. E.; Kim, S. J.; Jeong, H. W.; Lee, B. H.; Choi, J. Y.; Park, R. W.; Park, J. Y.; Kim, I. S. (2003). "RGD peptides released from βig-h3, a TGF-β-induced cell-adhesive molecule, mediate apoptosis". Oncogene. 22 (13): 2045–2053. doi:10.1038/sj.onc.1206269. PMID 12673209. S2CID 25129211.
- Kim, J. -E.; Jeong, H. W.; Nam, J. O.; Lee, B. H.; Choi, J. Y.; Park, R. W.; Park, J. Y.; Kim, I. S. (2002). "Identification of Motifs in the Fasciclin Domains of the Transforming Growth Factor-beta -induced Matrix Protein beta ig-h3 That Interact with the alpha vbeta 5 Integrin". Journal of Biological Chemistry. 277 (48): 46159–46165. doi:10.1074/jbc.M207055200. PMID 12270930.

== Patents ==
- Peptides for targeting apoptotic cells and uses thereof US 8217012 KR 20100029232 JP 2009273462 EP 2279201 CN 102177174
- Polypeptide specifically bound to phosphatidylserine and the use thereof US 8133971 KR 20090091589 JP 2011515075 EP 2280024 CN 101965356
- Peptide for diagnosing, preventing and treating atherosclerosis and uses thereof US 7968081 KR 20080090610
- Bladder tumor-targeting peptide and use thereof US 7745410
- Use of a peptide that interacts with alphaV beta3 integrin of endothelial cells EP 1620122
- Novel use of isolated polypeptide comprising four FAS-1 domains, EM1 domain and RGD motif US 2008274955 WO 2005099743
- Target-aiming drug delivery system for diagnosis and treatment of cancer containing liposome labeled with peptides which specifically targets interleukin-4 receptors, and manufacturing method thereof US 2012294931 EP 520281 KR 20110076836
- Peptide which passes through blood-brain barrier and targets apoptosis of neurodegenerative brain disease site and uses thereof US 2012288447 KR 20110053119 WO 2011059263
- Uses of apoptotic cell-targeting peptides, label substances and liposomes containing a therapeutic agent for preventing, treating or therapeutically diagnosing apoptosis-related diseases WO 2011059262
- Stroke-targeting peptide and use thereof US 2011150764 KR 20090125440

== Current lab members ==
- Gowri Rangaswamy Gunassekaran: Post-doctoral fellow (from India)
- Guruprasath Padmanaban : PhD student (from India)
- Jung Hyun-Kyung (정현경): PhD student (from South Korea)
- Chi Lianhua : PhD student (from China)
- Sri Murugan Poongkavithai Vadevod: PhD student (from India)
- Md. Enamul Haque: PhD student (from Bangladesh)
- Fatima Khan: PhD student (from India)
- Smirti Gurung: PhD student (from India)
- Lee Ji-young (이지영): lab manager

== Past lab members ==
- Sangeetha Purushotham: Post-doctoral fellow (from India)
- Bodhraj Acharya: post-doctoral fellow (from Nepal)
- Kai Wang: post-doctoral fellow (from China)
- Jung Jae-Yeop (정재엽): Master's student (from South Korea)
- Jung Joo-Hee (정주희): Master's student (from South Korea)
- Jung Yu-Min (정유민):Master's student (from South Korea)
