= Rainforest of the Austrians =

Environment protection project

Rainforest of the Austrians is an environment protection project was founded in 1991 by Michael Schnitzler, an Austrian violinist and grandson of the poet Arthur Schnitzler, as a non-profit organization. Its goal is raising funds to buy properties in the Esquinas Rainforest which is 146.7 square kilometres big and located in the south of Costa Rica. These properties become part of the Piedras Blancas National Park. This area of the rainforest was owned by local farmers.

In 1991 the government of Costa Rica declared the area a National Park to protect the forest against clearing. But there has not been enough money for buying the whole forest and foreign help was needed to realize an environmental protection plan.

At the end of 2005 33.7 square kilometres were bought. This area received the symbolical name 'Rainforest of the Austrians' (Ger. Regenwald der Österreicher). As a result of further protection initiatives there are now 90.3 square kilometres (65% of the Esquinas-rainforest) part of the National Park. 55.8 square kilometres are privately owned, but plans exist to integrate them into the National Park.

In the year 2000 the organization Rainforest of the Austrians was honored with the prestigious 'Binding Environmental Prize' in Liechtenstein. Vienna's Museum of Natural History had a special exhibition of the project on display. The Austrian national public broadcaster (ORF) aired a documentary as part of the television program series 'Universum'.

== See also ==
- Piedras Blancas National Park
