= Maik Landsmann =

East German racing cyclist

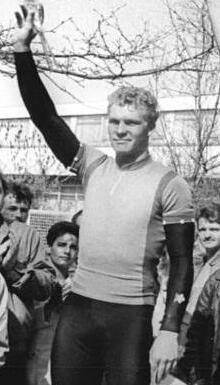
- Landsmann in 1988

Personal information
- Born: 25 October 1967 (age 58) Erfurt, East Germany

Cycling career
- Sport: Cycling
Medal record
Men's cycling
Representing East Germany
Olympic Games
Gold medal – first place	1988 Seoul	Team time trial
World Championships
Gold medal – first place	1989 Chambéry	Team time trial
Silver medal – second place	1990 Utsunomiya	Team time trial

Maik Landsmann (born 25 October 1967) is a retired track cyclist from East Germany, who represented his native country at the 1988 Summer Olympics in Seoul, South Korea. There he won the gold medal in the men's team time trial (100 km), alongside Uwe Ampler, Jan Schur and Mario Kummer. A year later he won the world title in the same event.

== Major results ==
1988
1st Team time trial, Summer Olympics (with Uwe Ampler, Mario Kummer and Jan Schur)
