= Chris Koberstein =

Canadian cyclist

Personal information
- Born: 28 May 1968 (age 58) Montreal, Quebec, Canada

Cycling career
- Sport: Cycling

Chris Koberstein (born 28 May 1968) is a Canadian former cyclist. He competed at the 1988 Summer Olympics and the 1992 Summer Olympics. He won a silver medal at the 1990 Commonwealth Games competing for Canada in the team time trial.
