= Wayne Randle =

British cyclist

Personal information
- Born: 21 October 1964 (age 61) Barnsley, South Yorkshire

Cycling career
- Sport: Cycling
Medal record
Cycling
Representing England
Commonwealth Games
Bronze medal – third place	1990 Auckland	team time trial

Wayne Randle (born 1964) is a British former cyclist.

== Cycling career ==
Randle represented England and won a bronze medal in the team time trial, at the 1990 Commonwealth Games in Auckland, New Zealand. He also competed in the road race where he finished in seventh place. He turned professional in 1993.
