= Uwe Ampler =

German cyclist

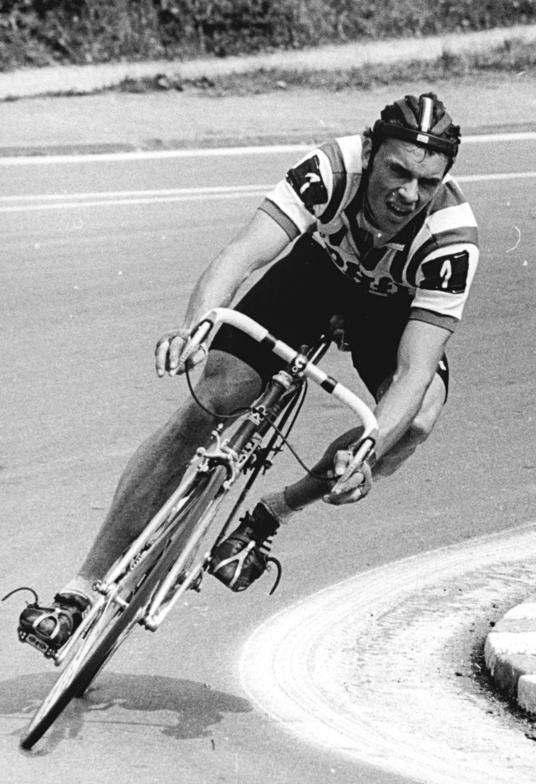

Personal information
- Full name: Uwe Ampler
- Born: 11 October 1964 (age 62) Zerbst, Bezirk Magdeburg, East Germany

Cycling career
- Sport: Cycling
- Discipline: Road
- Role: Rider

Amateur team
- 1983–1989: SC DHfK Leipzig

Professional teams
- 1990: PDM–Concorde–Ultima
- 1991: Histor–Sigma
- 1992–1993: Team Telekom
- 1997–1998: Mróz
- 1999: Agro–Adler Brandenburg

Major wins
- Stage races Peace Race (1987–1989, 1998) One-day races and Classics Olympic Road Race (1988) (Team Time Trial) World Road Race Championships (1986) (Amateur's Road Race)
Medal record
Representing East Germany
Men's road bicycle racing
Olympic Games
Gold medal – first place	1988 Seoul	Team time trial
World Championships
Gold medal – first place	1986 Colorado Springs	Amateur's Road Race
Bronze medal – third place	1986 Colorado Springs	Team Time Trial

Uwe Ampler (born 11 October 1964) is a retired track and road cyclist who competed for East Germany at the 1988 Summer Olympics in Seoul, South Korea. There he won the gold medal in the men's team time trial, alongside Jan Schur, Mario Kummer, and Maik Landsmann.

Ampler won the Peace Race in 1987, 1988, 1989 and 1998.

In August 1999 he tested positive for steroids during the Sachsen Tour and admitted he was doping. His father, Klaus Ampler, was also a famous cyclist. Also his son Rick Ampler (* 1989) was cyclist.

== Major results ==
1983
1st Stage 1 Okolo Slovenska
1985
3rd Overall Peace Race

1st Stage 4

1986
1st Prologue Peace Race
3rd Overall Tour du Vaucluse

1st Stage 1

1st Amateur's road race 1986 UCI Road World Championships
3nd Team time trial 1986 UCI Track Cycling World Championships
1st Overall DDR Rundfahrt
1987
1st Overall Peace Race

1st Stages 8, 9 (ITT) & 10

1st Overall DDR Rundfahrt
2nd Overall Tour du Vaucluse

1st Prologue

10th Overall Tour of Sweden
1988
1st Team time trial, Summer Olympics (with Mario Kummer, Jan Schur and Maik Landsmann)
1st Overall Peace Race

1st Prologue & Stage 6 (ITT)

5th Overall GP Tell

1st Stage 7b

1989
1st Overall Peace Race

1st Stages 9 & 11

1st Overall DDR Rundfahrt
5th Overall Circuit Cycliste Sarthe

1st Stage 4a

1990
1st Stage 10 Tour de Suisse
1st Stage 4 Setmana Catalana de Ciclisme
4th Overall Volta a la Comunitat Valenciana
9th Overall Vuelta a España

1st Young rider classification

1991
1st Stage 6 Paris-Nice
6th Overall Tour de Romandie
1992
1st Grand Prix of Aargau Canton
1993
5th Overall Tour of the Basque Country
1998
1st Overall Peace Race
1999
10th Overall Tour de Langkawi

== See also ==
- List of doping cases in cycling
- List of sportspeople sanctioned for doping offences
