= Swimming at the 1988 Summer Olympics – Women's 800 metre freestyle =

Women's 800 metre freestyle at the Games of the XXIV Olympiad
- Venue: Jamsil Indoor Swimming Pool
- Date: 23 September 1988 (heats); 24 September 1988 (final)
- Competitors: 27 from 19 nations

Medalists
1st place, gold medalist(s)		Janet Evans	United States
2nd place, silver medalist(s)		Astrid Strauss	East Germany
3rd place, bronze medalist(s)		Julie McDonald	Australia

The women's 800 metre freestyle event at the 1988 Summer Olym

pics took place between 20 and 21 September at the Jamsil Indoor Swimming Pool in Seoul, South Korea.

== Records ==
Prior to this competition, the existing world and Olympic records were as follows.

World record	Janet Evans (USA)	8:17.12	Orlando, United States	22 March 1988
Olympic record	Tiffany Cohen (USA)	8:24.96	Los Angeles, United States	3 August 1984

The following records were established during the competition:

Date	Round	Name	Nation	Time	Record
24 September	Final A	Janet Evans	United States	8:20.20	OR

== Results ==
=== Heats ===
Rule: The eight fastest swimmers advance to final A (Q).

Rank	Heat	Name	Nationality	Time	Notes
1	3	Astrid Strauss	East Germany	8:28.07	Q
2	3	Janet Evans	United States	8:28.13	Q
3	4	Julie McDonald	Australia	8:29.68	Q
4	4	Anke Möhring	East Germany	8:30.95	Q
5	2	Tami Bruce	United States	8:31.57	Q
6	2	Janelle Elford	Australia	8:32.14	Q
7	4	Isabelle Arnould	Belgium	8:34.56	Q
8	2	Antoaneta Strumenlieva	Bulgaria	8:35.40	Q
9	3	Debby Wurzburger	Canada	8:36.24	
10	4	Irene Dalby	Norway	8:38.33	
11	4	Tomomi Hosoda	Japan	8:39.55	
12	2	Manuela Melchiorri	Italy	8:40.63	
13	2	Karyn Faure	France	8:41.64	
14	3	Stephanie Ortwig	West Germany	8:41.95	
15	4	Natalia Trefilova	Soviet Union	8:43.19	
16	3	Karen Mellor	Great Britain	8:44.64	
17	2	Alexandra Russ	West Germany	8:49.31	
18	4	Pernille Jensen	Denmark	8:50.82	
19	4	Nurul Huda Abdullah	Malaysia	8:50.84	
20	3	Christelle Janssens	Belgium	8:51.22	
21	1	Patrícia Amorim	Brazil	8:51.95	
22	2	Eva Mortensen	Denmark	8:53.67	
23	3	Judit Csabai	Hungary	8:56.37	
24	2	Cécile Prunier	France	8:57.22	
25	1	Tracey Atkin	Great Britain	9:00.04	
26	4	Yan Ming	China	9:00.81	
27	1	Rita Jean Garay	Puerto Rico	9:04.62	

=== Final ===
Rank	Lane	Name	Nationality	Time	Notes
1st place, gold medalist(s)	5	Janet Evans	United States	8:20.20	OR
2nd place, silver medalist(s)	4	Astrid Strauss	East Germany	8:22.09	
3rd place, bronze medalist(s)	3	Julie McDonald	Australia	8:22.93	OC
4	6	Anke Möhring	East Germany	8:23.09	
5	2	Tami Bruce	United States	8:30.86	
6	7	Janelle Elford	Australia	8:30.94	
7	1	Isabelle Arnould	Belgium	8:37.47	
8	8	Antoaneta Strumenlieva	Bulgaria	8:41.05	
