= Denmark at the 1988 Summer Olympics =

- IOC code: DEN
- NOC: Danish Olympic Committee

in Seoul
- Competitors: 78 (57 men and 21 women) in 15 sports
- Flag bearer: Anne Törnblad
- Medals Ranked 23rd: Gold 2 Silver 1 Bronze 1 Total 4

Summer Olympics appearances (overview)
- 1896; 1900; 1904; 1908; 1912; 1920; 1924; 1928; 1932; 1936; 1948; 1952; 1956; 1960; 1964; 1968; 1972; 1976; 1980; 1984; 1988; 1992; 1996; 2000; 2004; 2008; 2012; 2016; 2020; 2024

Other related appearances
- 1906 Intercalated Games

Denmark competed at the 1988 Summer Olympics in Seoul, South Korea. 78 competitors, 57 men and 21 women, took part in 73 events in 15 sports.

== Medalists ==
Medal	Name	Sport	Event	Date
Gold	Dan Frost	Cycling	Men's points race	24 September
Gold	Jørgen Bojsen-Møller; Christian Grønborg	Sailing	Flying Dutchman	27 September
Silver	Benny Nielsen	Swimming	Men's 200 metre butterfly	24 September
Bronze	Jesper Bank; Jan Mathiasen; Steen Secher	Sailing	Soling	27 September

== Competitors ==
The following is the list of number of competitors in the Games.

Sport	Men	Women	Total
Archery	3	0	3
Athletics	4	1	5
Boxing	5	–	5
Canoeing	2	4	6
Cycling	8	1	9
Equestrian	2	2	4
Gymnastics	0	1	1
Judo	1	–	1
Modern pentathlon	1	–	1
Rowing	2	1	3
Sailing	11	3	14
Shooting	6	0	6
Swimming	8	7	15
Tennis	2	1	3
Weightlifting	2	–	2
Total	57	21	78

== Archery ==
After two Olympiads without competing in archery, Denmark returned to the sport in 1988. Three men competed, placing 11th as a team and no higher than 23rd as individuals.

Men's Individual Competition:

- Henrik Toft — 1/8 final (→ 23rd place)
- Jan Jacobsen — Preliminary round (→ 25th place)
- Niels Gammelgaard — Preliminary round (→ 56th place)

Men's Team Competition:

- Toft, Jacobsen, and Gammelgaard — Semifinal (→ 11th place)

== Athletics ==
Men's 1,500 metres

- Mogens Guldberg

Men's Marathon

- Henrik Jørgensen
  - Final — 2:16.40 (→ 22nd place)

Men's 110 metres Hurdles

- Erik Jensen

Men's Decathlon

- Lars Warming — 7859 points (→ 19th place)

1. 100 metres — 11.07s
2. Long Jump — 7.04m
3. Shot Put — 13.41m
4. High Jump — 1.94m
5. 400 metres — 47.97s
6. 110m Hurdles — 14.49s
7. Discus Throw — 40.38m
8. Pole Vault — 4.80m
9. Javelin Throw — 51.50m
10. 1.500 metres — 4:22.41s

Women's Long Jump

- Lene Demsitz

== Boxing ==
Men's Flyweight (– 51 kg)

- Johnny Bredahl
  - First Round — Lost to Hamed Halbouni (SYR), RSC-2

Men's Light-Welterweight

- Søren Søndergaard

Men's Light-Middleweight

- Johnny de Lima

Men's Light-Heavyweight

- Niels Madsen

Men's Heavyweight

- Claus Børge Nielsen

== Cycling ==
Nine cyclists, eight men and one woman, represented Denmark in 1988. Dan Frost won gold in the points race.

Men's road race

- Tommy Nielsen
- Peter Meinert Nielsen

Men's 1 km time trial

- Kenneth Røpke

Men's individual pursuit

- Peter Clausen

Men's team pursuit

- Peter Clausen
- Dan Frost
- Jimmi Madsen
- Lars Olsen
- Ken Frost

Men's points race

- Dan Frost

Women's road race

- Karina Skibby — 2:00:52 (→ 42nd place)

== Modern pentathlon ==
One male pentathlete represented Denmark in 1988.

Men's Individual Competition:

- Tue Hellstem — 4940pts (→ 27th place)

Men's Team Competition:

- Hellstem — 4940pts (→ 21st place)

== Sailing ==
Men

Athlete	Event	Race							Net points	Final rank
Athlete	Event	1	2	3	4	5	6	7	Net points	Final rank
Lasse Hjortnæs	Finn	1	~~RET~~	2	5	5	12	5	51.0	5
Hans Natorp; Paul Natorp	Men's 470	14	18	22	~~PMS~~	18	18	17	143.0	21

Women

Athlete	Event	Race							Net points	Final rank
Athlete	Event	1	2	3	4	5	6	7	Net points	Final rank
Mette Munch; Lone Sørensen	Women's 470	6	7	8	11	8	~~RET~~	RET	97.7	14

Open

Athlete	Event	Race							Net points	Final rank
Athlete	Event	1	2	3	4	5	6	7	Net points	Final rank
Jørgen Bojsen-Møller; Christian Grønborg	Flying Dutchman	1	4	2	2	~~6~~	3	6	31.4	Gold medal
Paul Elvstrøm; Trine Elvstrøm-Myralf	Tornado	16	14	~~RET~~	16	5	19	7	112.0	15
Anders Geert Jensen; Mogens Just	Star	~~PMS~~	10	10	9	8	2	5	74.0	11
Jesper Bank; Jan Mathiasen; Steen Secher	Soling	9	2	12	~~15~~	4	2	3	52.7	Bronze medal

== Swimming ==
Men's 50m Freestyle

- Vagn Høgholm
  - Heat — 23.50 (→ did not advance, 20th place)
- Peter Rohde
  - Heat — 23.70 (→ did not advance, 26th place)

Men's 100m Freestyle

- Franz Mortensen
  - Heat — 50.74
  - B-Final — 51.05 (→ 13th place)
- Peter Rohde
  - Heat — 51.38 (→ did not advance, 25th place)

Men's 200m Freestyle

- Franz Mortensen
  - Heat — 1:51.15
  - B-Final — 1:51.44 (→ 13th place)
- Jan Patvel Larsen
  - Heat — 1:53.61 (→ did not advance, 31st place)

Men's 400m Freestyle

- Claus Christensen
  - Heat — 4:00.46 (→ did not advance, 31st place)

Men's 100m Backstroke

- Lars Sørensen
  - Heat — 58.01 (→ did not advance, 21st place)

Men's 200m Backstroke

- Lars Sørensen
  - Heat — 2:05.73 (→ did not advance, 26th place)

Men's 100m Breaststroke

- Lars Sørensen
  - Heat — 1:06.30 (→ did not advance, 47th place)

Men's 200m Breaststroke

- Christian Toft
  - Heat — DSQ (→ did not advance, no ranking)

Men's 100m Butterfly

- Benny Nielsen
  - Heat — 54.52
  - B-Final — 54.77 (→ 11th place)

Men's 200m Butterfly

- Benny Nielsen
  - Heat — 1:59.26
  - Final — 1:58.24 (→ Silver Medal)
- Jan Patvel Larsen
  - Heat — 2:03.01 (→ did not advance, 23rd place)

Men's 4 × 100 m Freestyle Relay

- Franz Mortensen, Vagn Høgholm, Benny Nielsen, and Peter Rohde
  - Heat — 3:25.15 (→ did not advance, 10th place)

Men's 4 × 200 m Freestyle Relay

- Franz Mortensen, Claus Christensen, Jan Patvel Larsen, and Peter Rohde
  - Heat — 7:33.31 (→ did not advance, 11th place)

Men's 4 × 100 m Medley Relay

- Lars Sørensen, Christian Toft, Benny Nielsen, and Franz Mortensen
  - Heat — 3:51.97 (→ did not advance, 14th place)

Women's 50m Freestyle

- Gitta Jensen
  - Heat — 26.61 (→ did not advance, 20th place)

Women's 100m Freestyle

- Gitta Jensen
  - Heat — 57.28 (→ did not advance, 20th place)
  - B-Final — 57.02 (→ 13th place)
- Pia Sørensen
  - Heat — 57.82 (→ did not advance, 26th place)

Women's 200m Freestyle

- Mette Jacobsen
  - Heat — 2:01.80
  - B-Final — 2:01.84 (→ 11th place)
- Annette Jørgensen
  - Heat — 2:04.71 (→ did not advance, 24th place)

Women's 400m Freestyle

- Eva Mortensen
  - Heat — 4:18.06 (→ did not advance, 20th place)
- Pernille Jensen
  - Heat — 4:20.96 (→ did not advance, 26th place)

Women's 800m Freestyle

- Pernille Jensen
  - Heat — 8:50.82 (→ did not advance, 18th place)
- Eva Mortensen
  - Heat — 8:53.67 (→ did not advance, 22nd place)

Women's 200m Breaststroke

- Pia Sørensen
  - Heat — 2:38.49 (→ did not advance, 25th place)

Women's 200m Butterfly

- Mette Jacobsen
  - Heat — 2:15.78
  - B-Final — 2:15.60 (→ 13th place)

Women's 200m Individual Medley

- Annette Poulsen
  - Heat — 2:21.83 (→ did not advance, 20th place)

Women's 400m Individual Medley

- Annette Poulsen
  - Heat — 4:54.01
  - B-Final — 4:54.40 (→ 15th place)

Women's 4 × 100 m Freestyle Relay

- Mette Jacobsen, Gitta Jensen, Pia Sørensen, and Annette Jørgensen
  - Heat — 3:48.83
- Gitta Jensen, Pia Sørensen, Mette Jacobsen, and Annette Jørgensen
  - Final — 3:49.25 (→ 8th place)

Women's 4 × 100 m Medley Relay

- Mette Jacobsen, Pia Sørensen, Annette Jørgensen, and Gitta Jensen
  - Heat — DSQ (→ did not advance, no ranking)

== Tennis ==
Women's Singles Competition

- Tine Scheuer-Larsen
  - First Round — Defeated Warda Bouchabou (Algeria) 6–0, 6–1
  - Second Round — Defeated Wendy Turnbull (Australia) 6–4, 6–3
  - Third Round — Lost to Natasha Zvereva (Soviet Union) 1–6, 2–6
