= Swimming at the 1988 Summer Olympics – Women's 400 metre freestyle =

Women's 400 metre freestyle at the Games of the XXIV Olympiad
- Venue: Jamsil Indoor Swimming Pool
- Date: 22 September 1988 (heats & finals)
- Competitors: 30 from 21 nations
- Winning time: 4:03.85 WR

Medalists
1st place, gold medalist(s)		Janet Evans	United States
2nd place, silver medalist(s)		Heike Friedrich	East Germany
3rd place, bronze medalist(s)		Anke Möhring	East Germany

The women's 400 metre freestyle event at the 1988 Summer Olympics took place on 22 September at the Jamsil Indoor Swimming Pool in Seoul, South Korea.

== Records ==
Prior to this competition, the existing world and Olympic records were as follows;

World record	Janet Evans (USA)	4:05.45	Orlando, United States	20 December 1987
Olympic record	Tiffany Cohen (USA)	4:07.10	Los Angeles, United States	31 July 1984

The following records were established during the length of the competition;

Date	Round	Name	Nationality	Time	Record
22 September	Final A	Janet Evans	United States	4:03.85	WR

== Results ==
=== Heats ===
Rule: The eight fastest swimmers advance to final A (Q), while the next eight to final B (q).

Rank	Heat	Name	Nationality	Time	Notes
1	4	Janet Evans	United States	4:10.21	Q
2	2	Anke Möhring	East Germany	4:10.64	Q
3	4	Tami Bruce	United States	4:10.73	Q
4	2	Janelle Elford	Australia	4:11.07	Q
5	3	Heike Friedrich	East Germany	4:11.30	Q
6	4	Isabelle Arnould	Belgium	4:11.71	Q
7	4	Stephanie Ortwig	West Germany	4:12.18	Q
8	2	Natalia Trefilova	Soviet Union	4:12.20	Q
9	3	Noemi Lung	Romania	4:12.42	q
10	3	Sheridan Burge-Lopez	Australia	4:12.77	q
11	2	Antoaneta Strumenlieva	Bulgaria	4:13.25	q
12	3	Manuela Melchiorri	Italy	4:15.40	q
13	1	Chikako Nakamori	Japan	4:15.51	q
14	3	Cécile Prunier	France	4:15.63	q
15	4	Stela Pura	Romania	4:15.78	q
16	4	Patricia Noall	Canada	4:15.90	q
17	3	Irene Dalby	Norway	4:16.22	
18	4	Ruth Gilfillan	Great Britain	4:16.66	
19	2	Tomomi Hosoda	Japan	4:17.30	
20	3	Eva Mortensen	Denmark	4:18.06	
21	3	Yan Ming	China	4:18.58	
22	4	Alexandra Russ	West Germany	4:18.67	
23	1	Nurul Huda Abdullah	Malaysia	4:19.33	
24	1	Patrícia Amorim	Brazil	4:19.64	
25	2	Christelle Janssens	Belgium	4:19.95	
26	1	Pernille Jensen	Denmark	4:20.96	
27	2	June Croft	Great Britain	4:21.98	
28	1	Rita Jean Garay	Puerto Rico	4:24.84	
29	2	Judit Csabai	Hungary	4:25.52	
30	1	Senda Gharbi	Tunisia	4:34.67	

=== Finals ===
==== Final B ====
Rank	Lane	Name	Nationality	Time	Notes
9	5	Sheridan Burge-Lopez	Australia	4:10.21	
10	4	Noemi Lung	Romania	4:11.88	
11	1	Stela Pura	Romania	4:12.14	
12	3	Antoaneta Strumenlieva	Bulgaria	4:13.43	
13	8	Patricia Noall	Canada	4:14.70	
14	6	Manuela Melchiorri	Italy	4:14.90	
15	2	Chikako Nakamori	Japan	4:15.59	
16	7	Cécile Prunier	France	4:21.03	

==== Final A ====
Rank	Lane	Name	Nationality	Time	Notes
1st place, gold medalist(s)	4	Janet Evans	United States	4:03.85	WR
2nd place, silver medalist(s)	2	Heike Friedrich	East Germany	4:05.94	EU
3rd place, bronze medalist(s)	5	Anke Möhring	East Germany	4:06.62	
4	3	Tami Bruce	United States	4:08.16	
5	6	Janelle Elford	Australia	4:10.64	
6	7	Isabelle Arnould	Belgium	4:11.73	
7	1	Stephanie Ortwig	West Germany	4:13.05	
8	8	Natalia Trefilova	Soviet Union	4:13.92	
