= Swimming at the 1988 Summer Olympics – Men's 200 metre freestyle =

Men's 200 metre freestyle at the Games of the XXIV Olympiad
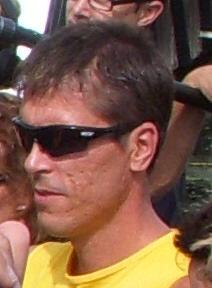
- Silver medalist Anders Holmertz (2009)
- Venue: Jamsil Indoor Swimming Pool
- Dates: 18 September 1988 (heats); 19 September 1988 (finals)
- Competitors: 63 from 41 nations
- Winning time: 1:47.25 WR

Medalists
1st place, gold medalist(s)		Duncan Armstrong	Australia
2nd place, silver medalist(s)		Anders Holmertz	Sweden
3rd place, bronze medalist(s)		Matt Biondi	United States

The men's 200 metre freestyle event at the 1988 Summer Olympics took place on 18–19 September at the Olympic Park Swimming Pool in Seoul, South Korea. There were 63 competitors from 41 nations, with each nation having up to two swimmers.

Australia's Duncan Armstrong set a new world record to win the Olympic title in the event. Swimming in lane six and coming from third at the final turn, he edged out a vastly experienced field for the gold medal in 1:47.25. His time also sliced 0.19 seconds off the global standard set by West Germany's Michael Gross at the 1984 Summer Olympics in Los Angeles.

Sweden's Anders Holmertz overtook U.S. swimmer Matt Biondi about midway through the final stretch, but could not catch Armstrong near the wall to finish with a silver in 1:47.89. It was Sweden's first medal in the men's 200 metre freestyle. Leading almost the entire race, Biondi faded down the stretch to break the 1:48 barrier and take the bronze at 1:47.99.

Poland's Artur Wojdat, a top qualifier on the morning preliminaries, dropped off the podium to a fourth-place time in 1:48.40. Meanwhile, Gross missed a chance to defend his Olympic title with a fifth-place finish in 1:48.59.

== Background ==
This was the eighth appearance of the 200 metre freestyle event. It was first contested in 1900. It would be contested a second time, though at 220 yards, in 1904. After that, the event did not return until 1968; since then, it has been on the programme at every Summer Games.

Two of the 8 finalists from the 1984 Games returned: gold medalist Michael Gross and bronze medalist Thomas Fahrner, both of West Germany. Gross was the two-time reigning World Champion as well, with wins in the 1982 and 1986 World Aquatics Championships. American Matt Biondi had taken bronze at the 1986 World Championships; he was a strong challenger even though his best races were at 100 metres. 1987 European champion Anders Holmertz of Sweden was also among the podium favourites; Duncan Armstrong of Australia was not a pre-race favourite.

Belgium, Guam, Luxembourg, Malaysia, Singapore, South Korea, and the United Arab Emirates each made their debut in the event. Australia made its eighth appearance, the only nation to have competed in all prior editions of the event.

== Competition format ==
The competition used a two-round (heats, final) format. The advancement rule followed the format introduced in 1952. A swimmer's place in the heat was not used to determine advancement; instead, the fastest times from across all heats in a round were used. There were 8 heats of up to 8 swimmers each. The top 8 swimmers advanced to the final. The 1984 event had also introduced a consolation or "B" final; the swimmers placing 9th through 16th in the heats competed in this "B" final for placing. Swim-offs were used as necessary to break ties.

This swimming event used freestyle swimming, which means that the method of the stroke is not regulated (unlike backstroke, breaststroke, and butterfly events). Nearly all swimmers use the front crawl or a variant of that stroke. Because an Olympic-size swimming pool is 50 metres long, this race consisted of four lengths of the pool.

== Records ==
Prior to this competition, the existing world and Olympic records were as follows.

World record	Michael Gross (FRG)	1:47.44	Los Angeles, United States	29 July 1984
Olympic record	Michael Gross (FRG)	1:47.44	Los Angeles, United States	29 July 1984

The following records were established during the competition:

Date	Round	Swimmer	Nation	Time	Record
19 September	Final A	Duncan Armstrong	Australia	1:47.25	WR

== Schedule ==
All times are Korea Standard Time adjusted for daylight savings (UTC+10)

Date	Time	Round
Sunday, 18 September 1988	9:00	Heats
Monday, 19 September 1988	12:00	Finals

== Results ==
=== Heats ===
Rule: The eight fastest swimmers advance to final A (Q), while the next eight to final B (q).

Rank	Heat	Swimmer	Nation	Time	Notes
1	7	Artur Wojdat	Poland	1:48.02	QA, NR
2	7	Matt Biondi	United States	1:48.39	QA
3	8	Michael Gross	West Germany	1:48.55	QA
4	8	Duncan Armstrong	Australia	1:48.86	QA
5	8	Troy Dalbey	United States	1:48.96	QA
6	7	Thomas Fahrner	West Germany	1:49.02	QA
7	7	Steffen Zesner	East Germany	1:49.13	QA
8	6	Anders Holmertz	Sweden	1:49.28	QA
9	8	Roberto Gleria	Italy	1:49.51	QB
10	8	Thomas Flemming	East Germany	1:49.52	QB
11	6	Stéphan Caron	France	1:49.66	QB, WD
12	6	Giorgio Lamberti	Italy	1:50.47	QB, WD
13	6	Aleksey Kuznetsov	Soviet Union	1:50.84	QB
14	6	Mariusz Podkościelny	Poland	1:50.95	QB
15	6	Tom Stachewicz	Australia	1:51.02	QB
16	5	Shigeo Ogata	Japan	1:51.14	QB
17	7	Franz Mortensen	Denmark	1:51.15	QB
18	6	Paul Howe	Great Britain	1:51.22	QB
19	7	Carlos Scanavino	Uruguay	1:51.42	
20	6	Alberto Bottini	Switzerland	1:51.45	
21	7	Tommy Werner	Sweden	1:51.96	
22	8	Iurie Başcatov	Soviet Union	1:52.04	
23	8	Cristiano Michelena	Brazil	1:52.32	
24	4	Patrick Dybiona	Netherlands	1:52.67	
25	4	Stéfan Voléry	Switzerland	1:52.94	
26	4	Rodrigo González	Mexico	1:52.99	
27	5	Michael Green	Great Britain	1:53.03	
28	5	Magnús Ólafsson	Iceland	1:53.05	
28	5	Daniel Serra	Spain	1:53.05	
30	5	Júlio César Rebolal	Brazil	1:53.16	
31	5	Jan Larsen	Denmark	1:53.61	
32	4	Ignacio Escamilla	Mexico	1:53.63	
33	5	Jean-Marie Arnould	Belgium	1:53.73	
34	5	Zoltán Szilágyi	Hungary	1:53.75	
35	7	Ludovic Depickère	France	1:53.81	
36	4	Salvador Vassallo	Puerto Rico	1:53.82	
37	8	Norbert Ágh	Hungary	1:54.72	
38	4	Yves Clausse	Luxembourg	1:54.90	
39	4	Xie Jun	China	1:55.04	
40	3	René Concepcion	Philippines	1:55.58	
41	3	Alexander Placheta	Austria	1:56.11	
42	4	Vaughan Smith	Zimbabwe	1:56.13	
43	2	David Lim	Singapore	1:56.44	
44	2	Joseph Eric Buhain	Philippines	1:56.84	
45	2	Kwon Sang-won	South Korea	1:56.88	
46	2	Oon Jin Gee	Singapore	1:57.28	
47	3	Moustafa Amer	Egypt	1:57.50	
48	3	Richard Sam Bera	Indonesia	1:57.60	
49	3	Jonathan Sakovich	Guam	1:57.72	
50	3	Stephen Cullen	Ireland	1:57.90	
51	2	Arthur Li Kai Yien	Hong Kong	1:58.10	
52	3	Hakan Eskioğlu	Turkey	1:58.45	
53	3	Jeffrey Ong	Malaysia	1:58.62	
54	2	Kwon Soon-kun	South Korea	1:58.95	
55	1	Wu Ming-hsun	Chinese Taipei	2:00.43	
56	2	Tsang Yi Ming	Hong Kong	2:01.02	
57	2	Richard Gheel	Ireland	2:01.73	
58	1	Hans Foerster	Virgin Islands	2:01.94	
59	1	Kristan Singleton	Virgin Islands	2:06.45	
60	1	Jason Chute	Fiji	2:09.05	
61	1	Mohamed Bin Abid	United Arab Emirates	2:09.43	
62	1	Ahmad Faraj	United Arab Emirates	2:13.21	
63	1	Émile Lahoud	Lebanon	2:16.39	

=== Finals ===
There were two finals, one for the top 8 swimmers and one for the next 8 (9th through 16th).

==== Final B ====
Rank	Lane	Swimmer	Nation	Time
9	4	Roberto Gleria	Italy	1:49.28
10	5	Thomas Flemming	East Germany	1:50.18
11	2	Tom Stachewicz	Australia	1:50.83
12	3	Aleksey Kuznetsov	Soviet Union	1:51.03
13	1	Franz Mortensen	Denmark	1:51.44
14	6	Mariusz Podkościelny	Poland	1:51.63
15	7	Shigeo Ogata	Japan	1:51.89
16	8	Paul Howe	Great Britain	1:51.99

==== Final A ====
Rank	Lane	Swimmer	Nation	Time	Notes
1st place, gold medalist(s)	6	Duncan Armstrong	Australia	1:47.25	WR
2nd place, silver medalist(s)	8	Anders Holmertz	Sweden	1:47.89	
3rd place, bronze medalist(s)	5	Matt Biondi	United States	1:47.99	
4	4	Artur Wojdat	Poland	1:48.40	
5	3	Michael Gross	West Germany	1:48.59	
6	1	Steffen Zesner	East Germany	1:48.77	
7	2	Troy Dalbey	United States	1:48.86	
8	7	Thomas Fahrner	West Germany	1:49.19	
