= Swimming at the 1988 Summer Olympics – Women's 400 metre individual medley =

Women's 400 metre individual medley at the Games of the XXIV Olympiad
- Venue: Jamsil Indoor Swimming Pool
- Date: 18 September 1988 (heats); 19 September 1988 (finals)
- Competitors: 31 from 21 nations
- Winning time: 4:37.76

Medalists
1st place, gold medalist(s)		Janet Evans	United States
2nd place, silver medalist(s)		Noemi Lung	Romania
3rd place, bronze medalist(s)		Daniela Hunger	East Germany

The women's 400 metre individual medley event at the 1988 Summer Olympics took place between 18–19 September at the Jamsil Indoor Swimming Pool in Seoul, South Korea.

== Records ==
Prior to this competition, the existing world and Olympic records were as follows.

World record	Petra Schneider (GDR)	4:36.10	Guayaquil, Ecuador	1 August 1982
Olympic record	Petra Schneider (GDR)	4:36.29	Moscow, Soviet Union	26 July 1980

== Results ==
=== Heats ===
Rule: The eight fastest swimmers advance to final A (Q), while the next eight to final B (q).

Rank	Heat	Name	Nationality	Time	Notes
1	3	Noemi Lung	Romania	4:41.96	Q
2	3	Kathleen Nord	East Germany	4:42.92	Q
3	4	Janet Evans	United States	4:43.04	Q
4	3	Jodie Clatworthy	Australia	4:44.26	Q, OC
5	4	Daniela Hunger	East Germany	4:44.85	Q
6	3	Yelena Dendeberova	Soviet Union	4:46.63	Q
7	2	Donna Procter	Australia	4:47.57	Q
8	3	Lin Li	China	4:48.89	Q
9	2	Yan Ming	China	4:49.04	q
10	4	Roberta Felotti	Italy	4:49.20	q
11	2	Erika Hansen	United States	4:50.03	q
12	2	Antoaneta Strumenlieva	Bulgaria	4:51.58	q
13	2	Christine Magnier	France	4:51.91	q
14	3	Birgit Lohberg-Schulz	West Germany	4:52.05	q
15	2	Anette Philipsson	Sweden	4:53.58	q
16	2	Annette Poulsen	Denmark	4:54.01	q
17	4	Anamarija Petričević	Yugoslavia	4:54.17	
18	4	Suki Brownsdon	Great Britain	4:54.66	
19	4	Yoshie Nishioka	Japan	4:55.31	
20	3	Marianne Muis	Netherlands	4:56.31	
21	3	Mildred Muis	Netherlands	4:56.89	
22	4	Irene Dalby	Norway	4:58.14	
23	1	Hiroyo Harada	Japan	5:00.92	
24	2	Tracey Atkin	Great Britain	5:01.34	
25	1	Michelle Smith	Ireland	5:01.84	
26	1	Marlene Bruten	Mexico	5:03.69	
27	1	Chang Hui-chien	Chinese Taipei	5:13.20	
28	1	Valentina Aracil	Argentina	5:19.17	
29	1	Annemarie Munk	Hong Kong	5:24.11	
30	1	Kimberly Chen	Chinese Taipei	5:28.15	
	4	Yuliya Bogacheva	Soviet Union	DNS	

=== Finals ===
==== Final B ====
Rank	Lane	Name	Nationality	Time	Notes
9	5	Roberta Felotti	Italy	4:49.53	
10	7	Birgit Lohberg-Schulz	West Germany	4:50.54	
11	3	Erika Hansen	United States	4:51.93	
12	6	Antoaneta Strumenlieva	Bulgaria	4:52.33	
13	1	Anette Philipsson	Sweden	4:52.77	
14	2	Christine Magnier	France	4:53.29	
15	8	Annette Poulsen	Denmark	4:54.40	
16	4	Yan Ming	China	4:55.92	

==== Final A ====
Rank	Lane	Name	Nationality	Time	Notes
1st place, gold medalist(s)	3	Janet Evans	United States	4:37.76	
2nd place, silver medalist(s)	4	Noemi Lung	Romania	4:39.46	
3rd place, bronze medalist(s)	2	Daniela Hunger	East Germany	4:39.76	
4	7	Yelena Dendeberova	Soviet Union	4:40.44	
5	5	Kathleen Nord	East Germany	4:41.64	
6	6	Jodie Clatworthy	Australia	4:45.86	
7	8	Lin Li	China	4:47.05	
8	1	Donna Procter	Australia	4:47.51	
