= Ireland at the 1988 Summer Olympics =

- IOC code: IRL
- NOC: Olympic Federation of Ireland
- Website: olympics.ie

in Seoul
- Competitors: 61 (52 men and 9 women) in 12 sports
- Flag bearer: Wayne McCullough
- Medals: Gold 0 Silver 0 Bronze 0 Total 0

Summer Olympics appearances (overview)
- 1924; 1928; 1932; 1936; 1948; 1952; 1956; 1960; 1964; 1968; 1972; 1976; 1980; 1984; 1988; 1992; 1996; 2000; 2004; 2008; 2012; 2016; 2020; 2024; 2028

Other related appearances
- Great Britain (1896–1920)

Ireland competed at the 1988 Summer Olympics in Seoul, South Korea. 61 competitors, 52 men and 9 women, took part in 47 events in 12 sports.

== Competitors ==
The following is the list of number of competitors in the Games.

Sport	Men	Women	Total
Archery	2	1	3
Athletics	14	4	18
Boxing	7	–	7
Canoeing	4	0	4
Cycling	5	0	5
Equestrian	7	0	7
Judo	1	–	1
Rowing	3	0	3
Sailing	3	2	5
Swimming	3	2	5
Tennis	2	0	2
Wrestling	1	–	1
Total	52	9	61

== Archery ==
In Ireland's fourth appearance in archery competition at the Olympics, the nation was represented by two men and one woman.

Athlete	Event	Preliminary round		Round of 16		Quarterfinal		Semifinal		Final	
Athlete	Event	Score	Rank	Score	Rank	Score	Rank	Score	Rank	Score	Rank
Joseph Malone	Individual	1162	69	Did not advance							
Noel Lynch	Individual	1141	74	Did not advance							
Pereira Greene	Individual	1208	38	Did not advance							

== Athletics ==
=== Men's Track ===
Athlete	Event	Heat		Semifinal		Final	
Athlete	Event	Time	Rank	Time	Rank	Time	Rank
Marcus O'Sullivan	1500m	3:42.01	6 q	3:38.84	6 q	3:38.39	8
Gerry O'Reilly	1500m	3:43.23	10	Did Not Advance			
John Doherty	5000m	13:47.99	7 Q	13:24.61	5 Q	13:27.71	9
Eamonn Coghlan	5000m	13:43.48	7 Q	14:02.16	15	Did Not Advance	
Frank O'Mara	5000m	13:59.46	10	Did Not Advance			
Thomas Kearns	110m Hurdles	14.17	4 Q	14.30	7	Did Not Advance	
Brendan Quinn	3000m Steeplechase	8:40.87	9 Q	8:43.34	11	Did Not Advance	

=== Women ===
Athlete	Event	Result	
Athlete	Event	Time	Rank
Anne Keenan-Buckley	3000m	9:03.10	24
Barbara Johnson	400m Hurdles	58.61	28
Marie Murphy-Rollins	Marathon	2:54:37	57
Ailish Smyth	Marathon	2:44:17	46

=== Men's Road Running ===
Athlete	Event	Final	
Athlete	Event	Time	Rank
Dick Hooper	Men's Marathon	2:17:16	24
John Woods	Men's Marathon	2:25:38	52
John Treacy	Men's Marathon	DNF	—
Jimmy McDonald	Men's 20km Race Walk	1:22:45	17

=== Field ===
Athlete	Event	Qualification		Final	
Athlete	Event	Time	Rank	Time	Rank
Conor McCullough	Hammer Throw	68.66	24	Did Not Advance	
Terry McHugh	Javelin Throw	76.46	22	Did Not Advance	

=== Decathlon ===
Athlete	Event	100 m	LJ	SP	HJ	400 m	110H	DT	PV	JT	1500 m	Points	Rank
Carlos O'Connell	Result	11.26	6.90	12.41	1.88	48.24	15.61	38.02	4.40	52.68	4:32.06	7310	29

== Boxing ==
Men's Light Flyweight (– 48 kg)

- Wayne McCullough

- First Round – Bye
- Second Round – Defeated Fred Mutuweta (Uganda), 5:0
- Third Round – Lost to Scott Olsen (Canada), 0:5

== Canoeing ==
- Patrick Holmes – Men's K-1 1000m 14th
- Alan Carey and Patrick Holmes – Men's K-2 500m 17th
- Declan Burns and Peter Connor – Men's K-2 1000m 14th

== Cycling ==
Five male cyclists represented Ireland in 1988.

Men's road race

- Cormac McCann – 45th
- John McQuaid – 49th
- Paul McCormack – 81st

Men's team time trial

Finished 19th behind Brazil and ahead of Great Britain with a time of 2:07:59.7

- Philip Cassidy
- Cormac McCann
- John McQuaid
- Stephen Spratt

== Equestrianism ==
=== Individual Dressage ===
- James Walsh on Robby 51st

=== Individual Eventing ===
- David Foster on Killiney Bay 16th
- John Watson on Tullineaskey DNF

=== Individual Jumping ===
- John Ledingham on Kilcoltrim =68th
- Paul Darragh on For Sure =68th
- Jack Doyle on Hardly 20th
- Gerry Mullins on Glendalough 22nd
- Team 11th

== Judo ==
Eugene McManus in Men's 71 kg lost in Round of 32 to Hugo d'Assunção from Portugal

== Rowing ==
Athlete	Event	Heat		Repechage		Semifinal		Final	
Athlete	Event	Time	Rank	Time	Rank	Time	Rank	Time	Rank
Pat McDonagh Frank Moore Coxswain: Liam Williams	Men's Coxed Pair	7:33.16	5 R	7:23.87	5	Did Not Advance			

== Sailing ==
- Cathy MacAleavey & Aisling Byrne-Bowman finished 18th in the Women's 470
- William O'Hara finished 21st in the Men's Finn
- David Wilkins & Peter Kennedy finished 10th in the Flying Dutchman

== Swimming ==
Men

Athlete	Event	Heat		Semifinal		Final	
Athlete	Event	Time	Rank	Time	Rank	Time	Rank
Stephen Cullen	200 m freestyle	1:57.90	50	—N/a		Did not advance	
Stephen Cullen	100 m backstroke	58.82	29	—N/a		Did not advance	
Stephen Cullen	200 m backstroke	2:06.98	27	—N/a		Did not advance	
Richard Gheel	200 m freestyle	2:01.73	57	—N/a		Did not advance	
Richard Gheel	100 m backstroke	59.37	36	—N/a		Did not advance	
Richard Gheel	200 m backstroke	2:05.71	25	—N/a		Did not advance	
Gary O'Toole	100 m breaststroke	1:05.34	34	—N/a		Did not advance	
Gary O'Toole	200 m breaststroke	2:18.93	18	—N/a		Did not advance	
Gary O'Toole	200 m individual medley	2:07.77	20	—N/a		Did not advance	

Women

Athlete	Event	Heat		Semifinal		Final	
Athlete	Event	Time	Rank	Time	Rank	Time	Rank
Michelle Smith	100 m backstroke	1:06.22	27	—N/a		Did not advance	
Michelle Smith	200 m backstroke	2:19.50	17	—N/a		Did not advance	
Michelle Smith	200 m individual medley	2:25.53	26	—N/a		Did not advance	
Michelle Smith	400 m individual medley	5:01.84	25	—N/a		Did not advance	
Aileen Convery	100 m backstroke	1:06.73	29	—N/a		Did not advance	
Aileen Convery	200 m backstroke	2:19.91	18	—N/a		Did not advance	

== Tennis ==
Men's Doubles Competition

- Owen Casey and Eoin Collins

- First Round – Lost 2-6 6-7 6-4 5-7

== Wrestling ==
David Harmon from Dublin was supposed to compete but withdrew from the Men's Greco-Roman 74 kg due to injury.
