= Sailing at the 1988 Summer Olympics – Flying Dutchman =

Sailing at the Olympics

Flying Dutchman at the Games of the XXIV Olympiad
- Flying Dutchman
- Venue: Busan 부산 釜山
- Dates: 20–27 September
- Competitors: 44 from 22 nations
- Teams: 22

Medalists
1st place, gold medalist(s)		Jorgen Bojsen-Moller; Christian Gronborg	Denmark
2nd place, silver medalist(s)		Ole Petter Pollen; Erik Bjørkum	Norway
3rd place, bronze medalist(s)		Frank McLaughlin; John Millen	Canada

The Flying Dutchman was a sailing event on the Sailing at the 1988 Summer Olympics program in Pusan, South Korea. Seven races were scheduled. 44 sailors, on 22 boats, from 22 nations competed. The second race falling on the Jewish most holy day of Yom Kippur prevented the Israeli duo Yoel Sela and Eldad Amir from sailing, thus pushing them out of the medals.

== Results ==
Rank	Helmsman (Country)	Crew	Race I		Race II		Race III		Race IV		Race V		Race VI		Race VII		Total Points	Total -1
Rank	Helmsman (Country)	Crew	Rank	Points	Rank	Points	Rank	Points	Rank	Points	Rank	Points	Rank	Points	Rank	Points	Total Points	Total -1
1st place, gold medalist(s)	Jørgen Bojsen-Møller (DEN)	Christian Grønborg	1	0.0	4	8.0	2	3.0	2	3.0	6	11.7	3	5.7	6	11.7	43.1	31.4
2nd place, silver medalist(s)	Ole Petter Pollen (NOR)	Erik Bjørkum	3	5.7	5	10.0	3	5.7	15	21.0	2	3.0	5	10.0	2	3.0	58.4	37.4
3rd place, bronze medalist(s)	Frank McLaughlin (CAN)	John Millen	5	10.0	6	11.7	1	0.0	12	18.0	9	15.0	6	11.7	1	0.0	66.4	48.4
4	Yoel Sela (ISR)	Eldad Amir	6	11.7	DNC	29.0	4	8.0	1	0.0	19	25.0	1	0.0	9	15.0	88.7	59.7
5	Murray Jones (NZL)	Greg Knowles	2	3.0	1	0.0	9	15.0	4	8.0	12	18.0	14	20.0	10	16.0	80.0	60.0
6	Roger Yeoman (GBR)	Neal McDonald	12	18.0	11	17.0	21	27.0	6	11.7	7	13.0	2	3.0	5	10.0	99.7	72.7
7	Alan Adler (BRA)	Marcus Temke	4	8.0	3	5.7	6	11.7	13	19.0	DSQ	29.0	9	15.0	11	17.0	105.4	76.4
8	Albert Batzill (FRG)	Peter Lang	13	19.0	2	3.0	5	10.0	8	14.0	14	20.0	7	13.0	RET	29.0	108.0	79.0
9	Ulf Lehmann (GDR)	Stefan Mädicke	17	23.0	8	14.0	15	21.0	10	16.0	5	10.0	11	17.0	3	5.7	106.7	83.7
10	David Wilkins (IRL)	Peter Kennedy	15	21.0	7	13.0	12	18.0	DSQ	29.0	1	0.0	13	19.0	8	14.0	114.0	85.0
11	Paul Foerster (USA)	Andrew Goldman	18	24.0	14	20.0	10	16.0	3	5.7	10	16.0	4	8.0	14	20.0	109.7	85.7
12	Laurent Delage (FRA)	Daniel Ferre	7	13.0	9	15.0	11	17.0	18	24.0	3	5.7	12	18.0	13	19.0	111.7	87.7
13	Luis Doreste (ESP)	Miguel Noguer	11	17.0	16	22.0	13	19.0	7	13.0	11	17.0	17	23.0	4	8.0	119.0	96.0
14	Sergey Borodinov (URS)	Viktor Budantsev	10	16.0	12	18.0	14	20.0	5	10.0	YMP	16.0	10	16.0	16	22.0	118.0	96.0
15	Henry Koning (NED)	Hans Schelling	16	22.0	17	23.0	7	13.0	11	17.0	8	14.0	8	14.0	12	18.0	121.0	98.0
16	Alexander Schroff (SUI)	Daniel Schroff	8	14.0	10	16.0	16	22.0	14	20.0	16	22.0	16	22.0	7	13.0	129.0	107.0
17	Gary Smith (AUS)	David Connor	21	27.0	13	19.0	8	14.0	16	22.0	4	8.0	18	24.0	15	21.0	135.0	108.0
18	Mats Nyberg (SWE)	Peter Eriksson	9	15.0	15	21.0	17	23.0	17	23.0	13	19.0	DSQ	29.0	18	24.0	154.0	125.0
19	Mario Celon (ITA)	Claudio Celon	14	20.0	18	24.0	18	24.0	9	15.0	PMS	29.0	15	21.0	17	23.0	156.0	127.0
20	Saburo Sato (JPN)	Tatsuya Wakinaga	19	25.0	19	25.0	19	25.0	19	25.0	17	23.0	21	27.0	DSQ	29.0	179.0	150.0
21	Eric Lockeyear (HKG)	Timothy Parsons	20	26.0	20	26.0	20	26.0	21	27.0	18	24.0	19	25.0	19	25.0	179.0	152.0
22	O Jong-yeol (KOR)	Kim Gi-han	22	28.0	21	27.0	22	28.0	20	26.0	20	26.0	20	26.0	RET	29.0	190.0	161.0

DNF = Did Not Finish, DSQ = Disqualified, PMS = Premature Start
Crossed out results did not count for the total result.
= Male, = Female

=== Daily standings ===
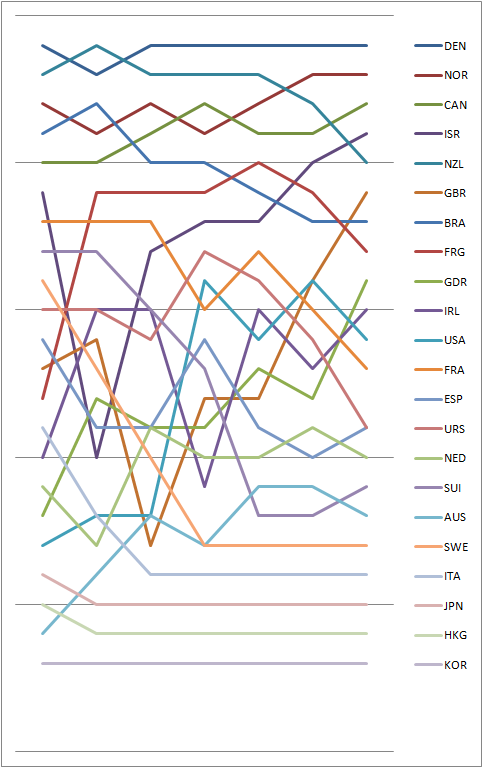
Graph showing the daily standings in the Flying Dutchman during the 1988 Summer Olympics
