= List of Bulgarian records in swimming =

The Bulgarian records in swimming are the fastest ever performances of swimmers from Bulgaria, which are recognised and ratified by Bulgarian Swimming Federation (Българска федерация плувни спортове).

All records were set in finals unless noted otherwise.

== Long Course (50 m) ==
=== Men ===
Event	Time		Name	Club	Date	Meet	Location	Ref
50 m freestyle	22.04	h, so	Kaloyan Bratanov	Texas Ford Aquatics	13 April 2024	TYR Pro Swim Series	San Antonio, United States	
100 m freestyle	48.83		Josif Miladinov	Mladost'91	18 December 2020	Bulgarian Team Championships	Sofia, Bulgaria	
200 m freestyle	1:46.48		Petar Mitsin	Bulgaria	26 June 2025	European U23 Championships	Šamorín, Slovakia	
400 m freestyle	3:44.31		Petar Mitsin	Bulgaria	9 July 2023	European Junior Championships	Belgrade, Serbia	
800 m freestyle	7:47.45		Petar Mitsin	Bulgaria	8 July 2023	European Junior Championships	Belgrade, Serbia	
1500 m freestyle	15:19.86		Ventsislav Aydarski	Bulgaria	6 December 2009	Grand Prix Alexandria	Thessaloniki, Greece	
50 m backstroke	25.44		Valentin Filipov	Asteri	18 July 2026	Bulgarian Championships	Sofia, Bulgaria	
100 m backstroke	54.96		Kaloyan Levterov	Slavia	6 November 2020	Grand Prix	Burgas, Bulgaria	
200 m backstroke	1:56.57		Kaloyan Levterov	Slavia	7 November 2020	Grand Prix	Burgas, Bulgaria	
50m breaststroke	27.34	h	Tonislav Sabev	Bulgaria	11 August 2023	European U23 Championships	Dublin, Ireland	
100m breaststroke	1:00.32	h	Lyubomir Epitropov	Tennessee Aquatics	8 April 2021	TYR Pro Swim Series	Mission Viejo, United States	
200m breaststroke	2:09.45		Lyubomir Epitropov	Bulgaria	20 June 2024	European Championships	Belgrade, Serbia	
50m butterfly	23.20	sf	Josif Miladinov	Bulgaria	11 August 2022	European Championships	Rome, Italy	
100m butterfly	50.93		Josif Miladinov	Bulgaria	23 May 2021	European Championships	Budapest, Hungary	
200m butterfly	1:54.50		Antani Ivanov	Bulgaria	19 May 2021	European Championships	Budapest, Hungary	
200m individual medley	2:00.70	h	Mihail Alexandrov	Bulgaria	13 August 2008	Summer Olympics	Beijing, China	
400m individual medley	4:22.59		Svetlozar Nikolov	Bulgaria	18 December 2020	Bulgarian Team Championships	Sofia, Bulgaria	
4×100m freestyle relay	3:19.41	h	Kaloyan Bratanov (49.06); Deniel Nankov (49.67); Yordan Yanchev (49.79); Kaloyan Levterov (50.89)	Bulgaria	20 June 2024	European Championships	Belgrade, Serbia	
4×200m freestyle relay	7:18.83	h	Antani Ivanov (1:49.00); Petar Mitsin (1:49.08); Kaloyan Levterov (1:51.10); Yordan Yanchev (1:49.65)	Bulgaria	11 August 2022	European Championships	Rome, Italy	
4×200m freestyle relay	7:17.98	h, #	Petar Mitsin (1:48.39); Miroslav Terziev (1:51.76); Daren Kirilov (1:48.56); Vasil Tushev (1:49.27)	Bulgaria	10 August 2026	European Championships	Paris, France	
4×100m medley relay	3:37.48	h	Kaloyan Levterov (55.89); Lyubomir Epitropov (1:00.13); Josif Miladinov (52.29); Antani Ivanov (49.17)	Bulgaria	23 May 2021	European Championships	Budapest, Hungary	

Legend: # – Record awaiting ratification by Bulgaria Swimming; WR – World record; ER – European record;
Records not set in finals: h – heat; sf – semifinal; r – relay 1st leg; rh – relay heat 1st leg; b – B final; † – en route to final mark; so – swim-off; tt – time trial

=== Women ===
Event	Time		Name	Club	Date	Meet	Location	Ref
50m freestyle	25.53	sf	Diana Petkova	Bulgaria	11 October 2018	Youth Olympic Games	Buenos Aires, Argentina	
100m freestyle	54.76	sf	Nina Rangelova	Bulgaria	17 May 2016	European Championships	London, Great Britain	
200m freestyle	1:58.27		Nina Rangelova	Bulgaria	21 May 2016	European Championships	London, Great Britain	
400m freestyle	4:11.71	h	Nina Rangelova	Bulgaria	29 July 2012	Olympic Games	London, Great Britain	
800m freestyle	8:35.40	h	Antoaneta Strumenlieva	Bulgaria	23 September 1988	Summer Olympics	Seoul, Korea	
1500m freestyle	16:55.53		Ivanka Moralieva	-	27 July 2001	World Championships	Fukuoka, Japan	
50m backstroke	28.64	sf	Ekaterina Avramova	Bulgaria	27 July 2011	World Championships	Shanghai, China	
100m backstroke	1:01.10	sf	Ekaterina Avramova	Bulgaria	25 July 2011	World Championships	Shanghai, China	
200m backstroke	2:09.95	sf	Gabriela Georgieva	Bulgaria	16 February 2024	World Championships	Doha, Qatar	
50m breaststroke	30.67	h	Teya Nikolova	Bulgaria	2 August 2025	World Championships	Singapore, Singapore	
100 m breaststroke	1:07.95		Tanya Dangalakova	Bulgaria	23 September 1988	Summer Olympics	Seoul, South Korea	
200m breaststroke	2:27.66		Tanya Dangalakova	Bulgaria	18 August 1986	World Championships	Madrid, Spain	
50m butterfly	27.44		Diana Petkova	Sprint	27 August 2020	Bulgarian Championships	Sofia, Bulgaria	
100m butterfly	1:00.02		Diana Petkova	Sprint Sofia	4 April 2026	Bulgarian Team Championships	Sofia, Bulgaria	
200m butterfly	2:13.69		Nevyana Miteva	-	15 July 1988	-	Sofia, Bulgaria	
200m individual medley	2:12.38	sf	Diana Petkova	Bulgaria	21 May 2021 (Note: by official result source; 22 May by federation source, a typo)	European Championships	Budapest, Hungary	
400m individual medley	4:49.25		Sonya Dangalakova	Bulgaria	26 July 1980	Summer Olympics	Moscow, Soviet Union	
4×100m freestyle relay	3:52.52		S. Blagova; Natalia Hristova; Radosveta Pironkova; Vanya Argirova	-	8 August 1985	-	Sofia, Bulgaria	
4×200m freestyle relay	8:16.69		Natasha Hristova; Adriana Borisova; Rumyana Kavardzhikova; Vanya Argirova	Bulgaria	18 August 1987	European Championships	Strasbourg, France	
4×100 m medley relay	4:11.92		Bistra Gospodinova; Tanya Dangalakova; Radosveta Pironkova; Vanya Argirova	-	10 August 1985	-	Sofia, Bulgaria	

Legend: # – Record awaiting ratification by Bulgaria Swimming; WR – World record; ER – European record;
Records not set in finals: h – heat; sf – semifinal; r – relay 1st leg; rh – relay heat 1st leg; b – B final; † – en route to final mark; so – swim-off; tt – time trial

=== Mixed relay ===
Event	Time		Name	Club	Date	Meet	Location	Ref
4×100m freestyle relay	3:37.20		Kaloyan Levterov (52.11); Maxim Ivanov (51.57); Ekaterina Avramova (58.12); Diana Petkova (55.40)	Sprint Sofia	12 July 2025	Bulgarian Championships	Sofia, Bulgaria	
4×100m medley relay	3:52.14	h	Gabriela Georgieva (1:04.33); Lyubomir Epitropov (1:01.53); Josif Miladinov (51.48); Diana Petkova (54.80)	Bulgaria	20 May 2021	European Championships	Budapest, Hungary	

Legend: # – Record awaiting ratification by Bulgaria Swimming; WR – World record; ER – European record;
Records not set in finals: h – heat; sf – semifinal; r – relay 1st leg; rh – relay heat 1st leg; b – B final; † – en route to final mark; so – swim-off; tt – time trial

== Short Course (25 m) ==
=== Men ===
Event	Time		Name	Club	Date	Meet	Location	Ref
50 m freestyle	21.50	h	Deniel Nankov	Bulgaria	14 December 2024	World Championships	Budapest, Hungary	
100 m freestyle	47.30	h	Deniel Nankov	Bulgaria	14 December 2022	World Championships	Melbourne, Australia	
200 m freestyle	1:43.48	h	Petar Mitsin	Bulgaria	18 December 2022	World Championships	Melbourne, Australia	
400 m freestyle	3:38.94	h	Petar Mitsin	Bulgaria	12 December 2024	World Championships	Budapest, Hungary	
800 m freestyle	7:46.98	h	Petar Mitsin	Bulgaria	5 December 2025	European Championships	Lublin, Poland	
1500 m freestyle	14:45.49		Petar Mitsin	Vihren	22 November 2023	Bulgarian Championships	Burgas, Bulgaria	
50 m backstroke	24.37	r	Vladislav Terziev	Psk Cherno More	28 November 2021	Bulgarian Championships	Burgas, Bulgaria	
100 m backstroke	52.46	h	Kaloyan Levterov	Bulgaria	7 December 2023	European Championships	Otopeni, Romania	
200 m backstroke	1:52.25		Daren Kirilov	Dorostol	20 November 2025	Bulgarian Championships	Burgas, Bulgaria	
50m breaststroke	26.83		Tonislav Sabev	Sprint Sofia	30 November 2024	Bulgarian Championships	Burgas, Bulgaria	
100m breaststroke	58.27	h	Lyubomir Epitropov	Bulgaria	16 December 2021	World Championships	Abu Dhabi, United Arab Emirates	
200m breaststroke	2:06.44	h	Lyubomir Epitropov	Bulgaria	18 December 2021	World Championships	Abu Dhabi, United Arab Emirates	
50m butterfly	23.14	h	Antani Ivanov	Bulgaria	5 November 2021	European Championships	Kazan, Russia	
100m butterfly	50.20	sf	Antani Ivanov	Bulgaria	2 November 2021	European Championships	Kazan, Russia	
200m butterfly	1:51.49	h	Antani Ivanov	Bulgaria	16 December 2021	World Championships	Abu Dhabi, United Arab Emirates	
100m individual medley	53.24		Josif Miladinov	SC Uster	18 November 2023	Swiss Championships	Uster, Switzerland	
200m individual medley	1:54.50	h	Kaloyan Bratanov	Bulgaria	13 December 2022	World Championships	Melbourne, Australia	
400m individual medley	4:10.98		Mihail Alexandrov	Bulgaria	9 December 2005	European Championships	Trieste, Italy	
4×50m freestyle relay	1:26.58	h	Josif Miladinov (22.15); Deniel Nankov (21.38); Kaloyan Bratanov (21.21); Antani Ivanov (21.84)	Bulgaria	15 December 2022	World Championships	Melbourne, Australia	
4×100m freestyle relay	3:12.15	h	Deniel Nankov (47.81); Josif Miladinov (48.16); Antani Ivanov (48.14); Kaloyan Bratanov (48.04)	Bulgaria	13 December 2022	World Championships	Melbourne, Australia	
4×200m freestyle relay	6:56.42	h	Petar Mitsin (1:43.76); Kaloyan Bratanov (1:43.68); Antani Ivanov (1:43.55); Yordan Yanchev (1:45.43)	Bulgaria	16 December 2022	World Championships	Melbourne, Australia	
4×50m medley relay	1:36.78		Kaloyan Levterov (25.14); Tonislav Sabev (26.89); Josif Miladinov (22.97); Yordan Yanchev (21.78)	Sprint Sofia	26 November 2023	Bulgarian Championships	Burgas, Bulgaria	
4×100m medley relay	3:33.05	h	Kaloyan Levterov (55.02); Tonislav Sabev (58.42); Antani Ivanov (51.88); Deniel Nankov (47.73)	Bulgaria	18 December 2022	World Championships	Melbourne, Australia	

Legend: # – Record awaiting ratification by Bulgaria Swimming; WR – World record; ER – European record;
Records not set in finals: h – heat; sf – semifinal; r – relay 1st leg; rh – relay heat 1st leg; b – B final; † – en route to final mark; so – swim-off; tt – time trial

=== Women ===
Event	Time		Name	Club	Date	Meet	Location	Ref
50 m freestyle	24.82	r	Diana Petkova	Sprint	21 December 2019	Bulgarian Championships	Sofia, Bulgaria	
100 m freestyle	53.85	h	Nina Rangelova	Bulgaria	4 December 2014	World Championships	Doha, Qatar	
200 m freestyle	1:56.01	h	Nina Rangelova	Bulgaria	7 December 2014	World Championships	Doha, Qatar	
400 m freestyle	4:06.00	h	Nina Rangelova	Bulgaria	17 December 2010	World Championships	Dubai, United Arab Emirates	
800 m freestyle	8:25.04		Antoaneta Strumenlieva	-	18 March 1988	-	Blagoevgrad, Bulgaria	
1500 m freestyle	16:32.4		Antoaneta Strumenlieva	-	23 January 1988	-	Plovdiv, Bulgaria	
50 m backstroke	27.30	sf	Ekaterina Avramova	Bulgaria	10 December 2011	European Championships	Szczecin, Poland	
100 m backstroke	58.58		Gabriela Georgieva	Damini LV	24 November 2023 (Note: by official result source; 25 November 2023 by national federation source, a typo)	Bulgarian Championships	Burgas, Bulgaria	
200 m backstroke	2:04.37	sf	Gabriela Georgieva	Bulgaria	6 December 2023	European Championships	Otopeni, Romania	
50 m breaststroke	29.97	sf	Diana Petkova	Bulgaria	6 December 2025	European Championships	Lublin, Poland	
100 m breaststroke	1:05.63	h	Diana Petkova	Bulgaria	5 December 2023	European Championships	Otopeni, Romania	
200 m breaststroke	2:25.95		Tanya Dangalakova	-	20 March 1988	-	Blagoevgrad, Bulgaria	
50 m butterfly	26.91		Diana Petkova	Sprint Sofia	29 November 2024	Bulgarian Championships	Burgas, Bulgaria	
100 m butterfly	59.94		Kalina Gamisheva	Aalborg Svømmeklub	14 November 2025	DM for Hold - 1. Division	Kastrup, Denmark	
200 m butterfly	2:12.94		Nevyana Miteva	-	18 March 1988	-	Blagoevgrad, Bulgaria	
100 m individual medley	58.28	sf	Diana Petkova	Bulgaria	12 December 2024	World Championships	Budapest, Hungary	
200 m individual medley	2:09.50	h	Diana Petkova	Bulgaria	10 December 2024	World Championships	Budapest, Hungary	
400 m individual medley	4:44.30		Antoaneta Strumenlieva	-	17 March 1988	-	Blagoevgrad, Bulgaria	
4×50 m freestyle relay	1:46.08		Kameliya Stoimenova (27.49); Margarita Stoimenova (27.19); Milena Kaludova (27.07); Diana Petkova (24.33)	Sprint Sofia	30 November 2024	Bulgarian Championships	Burgas, Bulgaria	
4×100 m freestyle relay	3:51.04		Rumyana Kavardzhikova; Radosveta Pironkova; Antoaneta Strumenlieva; Vanya Argirova	-	18 March 1988	-	Blagoevgrad, Bulgaria	
4×200 m freestyle relay	8:34.6		Adriana Borisova; B. Borisova; Yanita Rangacheva; Bistra Gospodinova	-	5 March 1987	-	Sofia, Bulgaria	
4×50 m medley relay	1:53.77		Margarita Stoimenova (29.38); Kameliya Stoimenova (30.71); Diana Petkova (26.59); Milena Kaludova (27.09)	Sprint Sofia	1 December 2024	Bulgarian Championships	Burgas, Bulgaria	
4×100 m medley relay	4:13.74		Mariya Kocheva; Antoaneta Frenkeva; Nevyana Miteva; Natalia Hristova	-	10 December 1989	-	Sabadell, Spain	

Legend: # – Record awaiting ratification by Bulgaria Swimming; WR – World record; ER – European record;
Records not set in finals: h – heat; sf – semifinal; r – relay 1st leg; rh – relay heat 1st leg; b – B final; † – en route to final mark; so – swim-off; tt – time trial

=== Mixed relay ===
Event	Time		Name	Club	Date	Meet	Location	Ref
4×50 m freestyle relay								
4×50 m medley relay	1:40.51	h	Gabriela Georgieva (28.35); Lyubomir Epitropov (27.24); Antani Ivanov (23.46); Diana Petkova (24.52)	Bulgaria	13 December 2018	World Championships	Hangzhou, China	

Legend: # – Record awaiting ratification by Bulgaria Swimming;
Records not set in finals: h – heat; so – swim-off
