= Jong-yul =

- Hangul: 종열
- RR: Jongyeol
- MR: Chongyŏl

Jong-yul, also spelled Jong-yeol, is a Korean given name. Jong-yul was the tenth-most popular name for newborn boys in 1940, according to South Korean government data.

People with this name include:

- Oh Jong-yul, South Korean sailor, competed in Sailing at the 1988 Summer Olympics – Flying Dutchman
- Kim Jong-yeol, South Korean politician; see List of members of the National Assembly (South Korea), 1950–54
- Kwon Jong-yul, South Korean bowler, competed in Bowling at the 1988 Summer Olympics

== See also ==
- Suk Jong-yul (석종율; born 1968), South Korean professional golfer
- List of Korean given names
