= Andrew Goodman =

Andrew Goodman may refer to:

- Andrew Goodman (activist) (1943–1964), American social worker and activist
- Andrew Goodman (rugby union) (born 1982), New Zealand rugby union player
- Andrew Goodman (bridge) (born 1946), American bridge player

== See also ==
- Andrew Goldman (born 1965), American Olympic sailor
- André Goodman (born 1978), American football player
