= Timothy Parsons =

Timothy Parsons may refer to:

- Timothy Parsons (sailor) (born 1952), Hong Kong sailor
- Timothy R. Parsons (1932–2022), Canadian oceanographer

== See also ==
- Timothy Persons (fl. 2000s–2010s), American curator, writer, artist, and adjunct professor
