= 2024 World Aquatics Swimming Championships (25 m) – Women's 100 metre individual medley =

Swimming competition

Women's 100 metre individual medley at the 2024 World Aquatics Swimming Championships (25 m)
- Venue: Duna Arena
- Location: Budapest, Hungary
- Dates: 12 December (heats and semifinals); 13 December (final)
- Competitors: 36
- Winning time: 55.11 WR

Medalists
gold medal	Gretchen Walsh	United States
silver medal	Kate Douglass	United States
bronze medal	Béryl Gastaldello	France

The women's 100 metre individual medley event at the 2024 World Aquatics Swimming Championships (25 m) was held from 12 to 13 December 2024 at the Duna Arena in Budapest, Hungary.

== Records ==
Prior to the competition, the existing world and championship records were as follows.

World record	Gretchen Walsh (USA)	55.98	Charlottesville, United States	18 October 2024
Competition record	Katinka Hosszú (HUN)	56.70	Doha, Qatar	5 December 2014

The following records were established during the competition:

Date	Event	Name	Nationality	Time	Record
12 December	Heat 4	Gretchen Walsh	United States	56.06	CR
12 December	Semifinal 2	Gretchen Walsh	United States	55.71	WR
13 December	Final	Gretchen Walsh	United States	55.11	WR

== Results ==
=== Heats ===
The heats were started on 12 December at 10:07.

Rank	Heat	Lane	Name	Nationality	Time	Notes
1	4	4	Gretchen Walsh	United States	56.06	Q, CR
2	3	4	Kate Douglass	United States	56.98	Q
3	2	3	Tessa Giele	Netherlands	57.87	Q
4	4	5	Mary-Sophie Harvey	Canada	58.21	Q
5	4	6	Rebecca Meder	South Africa	58.44	Q, AF
6	2	4	Béryl Gastaldello	France	58.58	Q
7	3	3	Diana Petkova	Bulgaria	58.79	Q, NR
8	3	7	Ellen Walshe	Ireland	58.85	Q, NR
9	2	5	Sydney Pickrem	Canada	58.92	Q
10	2	6	Tamara Potocká	Slovakia	58.95	Q, NR
11	3	5	Louise Hansson	Sweden	59.02	Q
12	2	2	Helena Gasson	New Zealand	59.14	Q
13	4	1	Barbora Janíčková	Czech Republic	59.25	Q, NR
14	3	2	Zheng Huiyu	China	59.58	Q
15	4	8	Fernanda Gomes Celidonio	Brazil	59.78	Q, NR
16	2	1	Anastasiya Kuliashova	Neutral Athletes A	59.82	Q
17	2	7	Qian Xinan	China	1:00.01	R
=18	3	6	Iona Anderson	Australia	1:00.06	R
=18	3	8	Stefanía Gómez	Colombia	1:00.06	R
20	4	2	Chiara Della Corte	Italy	1:00.14	
=21	3	1	Emma Carrasco	Spain	1:00.19	
=21	4	3	Lena Kreundl	Austria	1:00.19	
23	4	0	Kristen Romano	Puerto Rico	1:00.76	NR
24	4	9	Maria Romanjuk	Estonia	1:00.80	
25	2	8	Adela Piskorska	Poland	1:01.27	
26	2	0	Chloe Isleta	Philippines	1:01.89	
27	3	9	Valerie Rose Tarazi	Palestine	1:02.00	
28	1	4	Tam Hoi Lam	Hong Kong	1:02.41	
29	1	2	Vala Cicero	Iceland	1:03.06	
30	4	7	Fanny Teijonsalo	Finland	1:03.27	
31	2	9	Alexis Margett	Bolivia	1:04.38	
32	1	7	Wilina Jules-Marthe	Cape Verde	1:05.84	
33	1	6	Molina Smalley	Namibia	1:06.01	
34	1	5	M.C.A. Batallones	Northern Mariana Islands	1:08.46	
35	1	3	Chloe Ameara	Vanuatu	1:25.47	
	3	0	Lora Komoróczy	Hungary	Did not start	

=== Semifinals ===
The semifinals were started on 12 December at 18:52.

Rank	Heat	Lane	Name	Nationality	Time	Notes
1	2	4	Gretchen Walsh	United States	55.71	Q, WR
2	1	4	Kate Douglass	United States	56.88	Q
3	1	5	Mary-Sophie Harvey	Canada	57.19	Q
4	2	3	Rebecca Meder	South Africa	57.69	Q, AF
5	2	5	Tessa Giele	Netherlands	57.70	Q
6	1	3	Béryl Gastaldello	France	57.73	Q
7	2	6	Diana Petkova	Bulgaria	58.28	Q
8	2	2	Sydney Pickrem	Canada	58.47	Q
9	1	6	Ellen Walshe	Ireland	58.55	R, NR
10	2	7	Louise Hansson	Sweden	58.67	R
11	1	7	Helena Gasson	New Zealand	58.70	
=12	1	2	Tamara Potocká	Slovakia	59.31	
=12	2	1	Barbora Janíčková	Czech Republic	59.31	
14	1	1	Zheng Huiyu	China	59.34	
15	2	8	Fernanda Gomes Celidonio	Brazil	59.58	NR
16	1	8	Anastasiya Kuliashova	Neutral Athletes A	1:00.26	

=== Final ===
The final was held on 13 December at 18:51.

Rank	Lane	Name	Nationality	Time	Notes
1st place, gold medalist(s)	4	Gretchen Walsh	United States	55.11	WR
2nd place, silver medalist(s)	5	Kate Douglass	United States	56.49	
3rd place, bronze medalist(s)	7	Béryl Gastaldello	France	56.67	NR
4	3	Mary-Sophie Harvey	Canada	57.04	
5	2	Tessa Giele	Netherlands	57.69	
6	6	Rebecca Meder	South Africa	58.10	
7	1	Diana Petkova	Bulgaria	58.73	
8	8	Sydney Pickrem	Canada	59.07	
