= Michael Green (swimmer) =

British swimmer

Personal information
- Nationality: British
- Born: 15 November 1963 (age 62) Barking, Essex, England

Sport
- Sport: Swimming
- Club: Michigan State Spartans

Michael Green (born 15 November 1963) is a British swimmer. He competed in the men's 200 metre freestyle at the 1988 Summer Olympics.
