= Peter Eriksson (sailor) =

Swedish sailor

Personal information
- Nationality: Swedish
- Born: 29 September 1960 (age 64); Gothenburg, Sweden

Sport
- Sport: Sailing

Peter Eriksson (born 29 September 1960) is a Swedish sailor. He competed in the Flying Dutchman event at the 1988 Summer Olympics.
