= Eric Lockeyear =

Hong Kong sailor

Personal information
- Nationality: Hong Konger
- Born: 3 June 1941 (age 83)

Sport
- Sport: Sailing

Eric Lockeyear (born 3 June 1941) is a Hong Kong sailor. He competed in the Flying Dutchman event at the 1988 Summer Olympics.
