= Ole Petter Pollen =

Norwegian sailor (born 1966)

Personal information
- Born: 16 September 1966 (age 59) Rygge, Norway
- Height: 182 cm (6 ft 0 in)
- Weight: 71 kg (157 lb)

Sailing career
- Sport: Sailing
- Club: Moss Seilforening
- Class(es): Flying Dutchman, Europe
Medal record
Sailing
Representing Norway
Olympic Games
Silver medal – second place	1988 Seoul	Flying Dutchman
Europe World Championships
Gold medal – first place	1985 Tønsberg	Europe

Ole Petter Pollen (born 16 September 1966) is a Norwegian sailor, world champion in Europe (dinghy) and Olympic medalist in Flying Dutchman.

== Sailing career ==
Pollen became World Champion in Europe (dinghy) in 1985. He won a silver medal in the Flying Dutchman class at the 1988 Summer Olympics in Seoul, together with Erik Bjørkum. Pollen and Bjørkum won a silver medal at the 1988 European Championships, and a bronze medal at the 1989 Flying Dutchman World Championship.

Pollen resides at Stabekk.
