= Tami Bruce =

American swimmer (born 1967)

Personal information
- Full name: Tami Lee Bruce
- National team: United States
- Born: March 6, 1967 (age 59) San Diego, California, U.S.
- Height: 5 ft 7 in (1.70 m)
- Weight: 137 lb (62 kg)

Sport
- Sport: Swimming
- Strokes: Freestyle
- College team: University of Florida
Medal record
Women's swimming
Representing the United States
Pan Pacific Championships
| Gold medal – first place | 1985 Tokyo | 800 m freestyle |
Pan American Games
| Gold medal – first place | 1987 Indianapolis | 400 m medley |
| Gold medal – first place | 1987 Indianapolis | 800 m freestyle |

Tami Lee Bruce (born March 6, 1967) is an American former competition swimmer who represented the United States in two freestyle events at the 1988 Summer Olympics.

== Early years ==
Bruce was born in San Diego in 1967. She attended Hilltop High School in Chula Vista, California, and swam for the Hilltop Lancers high school team. She graduated from Hilltop in 1985. She also trained with the Mission Viejo Nadadores swim team.

== College swimming career ==
Bruce accepted an athletic scholarship to attend the University of Florida in Gainesville, Florida, where she swam for coach Randy Reese's Florida Gators swimming and diving team in NCAA and Southeastern Conference (SEC) competition from 1986 to 1989. During her four-year college career, she was a seven-time NCAA national champion—three times in the 1,650-yard freestyle (1986, 1987, 1988), twice in the 500-yard freestyle (1986, 1988), once in the 200-yard freestyle, and, together with Paige Zemina, Carmen Cowart and Debbie Daniel, was a member of the Gators' NCAA championship relay team in the 4x200 freestyle relay. She also won seven SEC individual titles in the 500-yard freestyle (1986, 1987, 1988), 1,650-yard freestyle (1986, 1987, 1988), and 200-yard freestyle (1988), was a member of three of the Gators' SEC championship relay teams in the 4x200-yard event (1986, 1987, 1988), and was named SEC Swimmer of the Year (1988).

Bruce was inducted into the University of Florida Athletic Hall of Fame as a "Gator Great" in 2005.

== International swimming career ==
At the 1987 Pan American Games in Indianapolis, Indiana, Bruce was a double gold medalist in the 400-meter individual medley and the 800-meter freestyle. At the 1988 Summer Olympics in Seoul, South Korea, she placed fourth in the world in the women's 400-meter freestyle event with a time of 4:08.16, and fifth in the women's 800-meter freestyle event in 8:30.86.

Bruce attempted a comeback in 1993, after several years out of the pool. While competing for the Australian women's swim team, she finished sixth in the short-course 400-meter freestyle event at the 1993 FINA World Swimming Championships in Palma de Mallorca, Spain.

== Life after swimming ==
Bruce married Australian Olympian and fellow Florida Gator swimmer Duncan Armstrong in October 1989; they have two sons. Armstrong and Bruce later divorced.

== See also ==
- List of University of Florida alumni
- List of University of Florida Athletic Hall of Fame members
- List of University of Florida Olympians
