= Kim Gi-han =

South Korean sailor

Personal information
- Nationality: South Korean
- Born: 22 January 1963 (age 62)
- Height: 180 cm (5 ft 11 in)
- Weight: 83 kg (183 lb)

Sport
- Sport: Sailing

Kim Gi-han (Korean: 김기한, also known as Kim Ki-han, born 22 January 1963) is a South Korean sailor. He competed in the Flying Dutchman event at the 1988 Summer Olympics.
