= Alexander Schroff =

Swiss sailor

Personal information
- Nationality: Swiss
- Born: 13 June 1962 (age 62)

Sport
- Sport: Sailing

Alexander Schroff (born 13 June 1962) is a Swiss sailor. He competed in the Flying Dutchman event at the 1988 Summer Olympics.
