= Janet Evans =

American swimmer (born 1971)

Janet Evans OLY
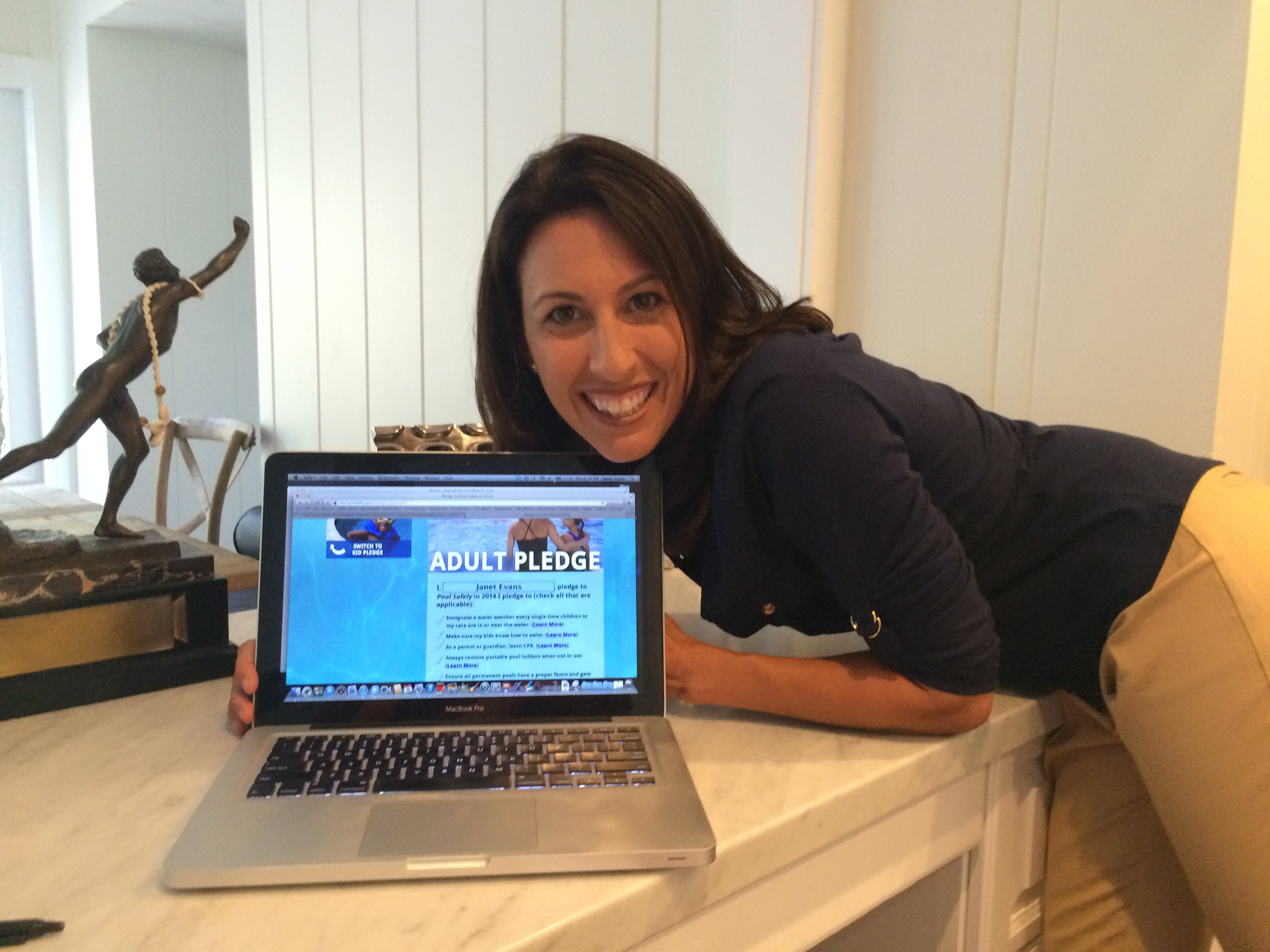
- Evans in 2014

Personal information
- Full name: Janet Beth Evans
- National team: United States
- Born: August 28, 1971 (age 54) Fullerton, California, U.S.
- Height: 5 ft 5 in (165 cm)
- Weight: 119 lb (54 kg)
- Spouse: Bill Willson

Sport
- Sport: Swimming
- Strokes: Freestyle, individual medley
- Club: Fullerton Aquatics; Golden West Swim Club; Trojan SC
- College team: Stanford University
- Coach: Bud McAllister (FAST); Richard Quick (Stanford); Mark Schubert (Texas AC)(Trojan SC)
Medal record
Event	1st	2nd	3rd
Olympic Games	4	1	0
World Championships (LC)	3	1	1
World Championships (SC)	2	0	0
Pan Pacific Championships	12	2	0
Total	21	4	1
Women's Swimming
Representing United States
Olympic Games
Gold medal – first place	1988 Seoul	400 m freestyle
Gold medal – first place	1988 Seoul	800 m freestyle
Gold medal – first place	1988 Seoul	400 m medley
Gold medal – first place	1992 Barcelona	800 m freestyle
Silver medal – second place	1992 Barcelona	400 m freestyle
World Championships (LC)
Gold medal – first place	1991 Perth	400 m freestyle
Gold medal – first place	1991 Perth	800 m freestyle
Gold medal – first place	1994 Rome	800 m freestyle
Silver medal – second place	1991 Perth	200 m freestyle
Bronze medal – third place	1994 Rome	4 x 200 m freestyle
World Championships (SC)
Gold medal – first place	1993 Palma	400 m freestyle
Gold medal – first place	1993 Palma	800 m freestyle
Pan Pacific Championships
Gold medal – first place	1987 Brisbane	400 m freestyle
Gold medal – first place	1987 Brisbane	400 m medley
Gold medal – first place	1989 Tokyo	400 m freestyle
Gold medal – first place	1989 Tokyo	800 m freestyle
Gold medal – first place	1989 Tokyo	400 m medley
Gold medal – first place	1989 Tokyo	4x200 m freestyle
Gold medal – first place	1991 Edmonton	400 m freestyle
Gold medal – first place	1991 Edmonton	800 m freestyle
Gold medal – first place	1991 Edmonton	4x200 m freestyle
Gold medal – first place	1993 Kobe	400 m freestyle
Gold medal – first place	1993 Kobe	800 m freestyle
Gold medal – first place	1993 Kobe	4x200 m freestyle
Silver medal – second place	1987 Brisbane	800 m freestyle
Silver medal – second place	1991 Edmonton	200 m freestyle

Janet Beth Evans (born August 28, 1971) is an American former competition swimmer who swam from 1989 to 1992 for Stanford University and specialized in distance freestyle events. Evans was a world champion and world record-holder, and won a total of four gold medals in the 400 and 800-meter freestyle events at the 1988 and the 1992 Olympics. In the late 1980s Evans was the first woman to hold three world records simultaneously in the 400, 800, and 1500-meter freestyle and was the first American woman to win four individual Olympic gold medals in swimming.

== Career ==
=== Early career ===
Born in Fullerton, California, Evans grew up in neighboring Placentia, where she started swimming competitively by the age of 5. By the age of 11, she was setting national age group records in distance events. She swam as a teenager for Fullerton Aquatics Sports Team (FAST Swimming) where her most influential coach in the mid-1980's was Bud McAllister.

In 1987, at age 15, Evans broke the world records in the 400-meter, 800-meter, and 1,500-meter freestyle distances.

=== High school ===
She graduated from El Dorado High School, and when not competing or representing FAST, she swam meets and trained with El Dorado High, where she was coached by Tom Milich, a 1987 California Swimming Coach of the Year, and an American Swimming Coaches Association (ASCA) Distinguished Coach of the Year.

=== College ===
==== Stanford University ====
Evans attended Stanford University, where she swam for the Stanford Cardinal swimming and diving team from 1989 to 1991 under Stanford's Hall of Fame Women's Head Coach Richard Quick. At Stanford, she received the Honda Sports Award for Swimming and Diving, recognizing her as the outstanding college female swimmer of the year in 1988–89. At Stanford, Evans was an All-American eight times, dominating distance events. She captured all the 500 free and 1650 free events in both 1990 and 1991, and in 1990 also captured a 400 IM title. She also took two national titles in the 800 free relay during those seasons.

==== University of Southern California ====
When the NCAA placed weekly hours limits on athletic training time, she quit the Stanford swim team to focus full time on training. She began training at the University of Texas at Austin the Texas Aquatic Club around 1992 under Coach Mark Schubert who helped prepare her for 1992 Olympic competition. Schubert served as Head women's coach in the 1992 Olympics, where Evans excelled. After enrolling for the Spring semester in 1993, Evans graduated from the University of Southern California with a bachelor's degree in communications in 1994, where Mark Schubert had moved and continued his coaching career. At USC, Evans trained under Schubert, worked out with the USC team and the Trojan Swim Club, and served as a student Assistant Coach for two seasons for the USC Women's swim team. She could not compete for USC, however, because she had accepted commercial endorsements in Spring, 1991 after her Sophomore season at Stanford.

== Olympics ==
=== 1988 Olympics ===
At the 1988 Summer Olympics in Seoul, South Korea, she won three individual gold medals in the 400 and 800-meter freestyle and the 400-meter Individual Medley. At the games, she earned the nickname "Miss Perpetual Motion" due to her unique swimming style. In these Olympics, Evans set a new world record in the 400-meter freestyle event. This record stood for 18 years until France's Laure Manaudou broke it in May 2006.

Evans held the 1,500-meter freestyle record, set in March 1988, through June 2007, when it was broken by American Kate Ziegler with her time of 15:42.54.

Evans held the world record in the 800-meter freestyle, 8:16:22, that she set in August 1989, until it was broken by Rebecca Adlington of Britain in August 2008. Adlington set the new record with her time of 8:14.10 in winning the race at the 2008 Summer Olympics. Evans's 800-meter record was one of the longest-standing ones ever in swimming, and it went unbroken through four Olympic Games (1992–2004). Only the 100-meter freestyle swimming record set by the Dutch swimmer Willy den Ouden stood longer—from 1936 through 1956, during a period when international competition was interrupted by world war.

Following her 1988 Olympics performance, Evans continued to dominate the world's long-distance swimming competitions, remaining undefeated in all of the 400-, 800-, and 1500-meter freestyle events for over five years.

=== 1992 Olympics ===
Evans became the first woman to capture back-to-back Olympic and world championship titles in any one swimming event by winning the 1988 and 1992 Olympic gold medals and the 1991 and 1994 world championships in the 800-meter freestyle race. At the 1992 Barcelona Olympics, she won a silver in the 400-meter freestyle with a time of 4:07.37, taking second, and finished about .2 seconds behind German swimmer Dagmar Hase, whom she led for almost the entire competition but was narrowly caught at the end. Evans had held the record in the 400 since the 1988 Olympics, but her times in the event had been continually slowing. At the 1992 Barcelona Olympics, she also won a gold in the 800-meter freestyle in 8:25.52, another signature distance event, finishing nearly 5 seconds ahead of Australia's Haley Lewis.

Evans won the 400-meter and 800-meter freestyle events at the U.S. National Championships 12 times each, the largest number of national titles in one event by an American swimmer in the 100-year history of the competition.

=== 1996 Olympics ===
Evans ended her swimming career, for all practical purposes, at the 1996 Summer Olympics in Atlanta, Georgia. She did not win any medals, but she did add one more highlight to her life. She was given the honour of carrying the Olympic torch in the opening ceremony, handing it to the American boxing legend Muhammad Ali who lit the Olympic cauldron.

On July 27, 1996, she was in a building being interviewed by a German newsman when a bomb exploded nearby. The explosion very lightly shook the building and startled Evans. The incident traumatized her so much that she had a panic attack the next day while waiting for a train in an Atlanta subway station.

In 1996 Olympic heats, Evans finished ninth in the preliminaries of the 400-meter freestyle. She did not qualify for the finals, as only the top eight finishers advance to the next level. In the final swim of her career, Evans finished in sixth place in the 800-meter freestyle.

At the 1996 Atlanta Games, American swimming officials criticized Ireland's Michelle Smith about her unexpected gold medals, suggesting that she might have been using performance-enhancing drugs. When asked about the accusations, Evans said that when anyone like Smith showed such a significant improvement, "there's always that question." American sportswriters sympathetic to Smith took this comment to mean that Evans was accusing Smith of steroid use as well, and they attacked Evans as being a sore loser. Evans later insisted that she meant no such accusation and that her remarks were taken out of context. In 1998, Smith received a four-year suspension for tampering with a urine sample.

=== 2012 Olympic trials ===
In June 2011, it was reported that Evans was in the process of a comeback and had been training for six months with the goal of competing at the 2012 U.S. Olympic Trials. At the 2012 Olympic Trials, at the age of 40, she finished 80th out of 113 swimmers in the 400-meter freestyle and 53rd out of 65 swimmers in the 800-meter freestyle.

At the end of Evans's swimming career, she held seven world records, five Olympic medals (including four gold medals), and 45 American national titles – third only to Tracy Caulkins and Michael Phelps. She was the first American woman to win four individual Olympic gold medals in swimming.

== Other activities ==
In 2010, Evans returned to competitive swimming as a United States Masters swimmer.

On November 3, 2016, Evans was chosen to serve as co-Grand Marshal of the 2017 Rose Parade.

Evans served as Vice Chair and Athletes director for the Los Angeles 2024 Olympic bid committee and traveled with the team to promote Los Angeles as a candidate city. Los Angeles was ultimately awarded the 2028 Summer Olympics at the 131st IOC Session in Lima, Peru, on September 13, 2017. As of 2020, Evans works with the organizing committee for the 2028 Summer Olympics in the executive leadership role of chief athlete officer.

As of August 2019, Evans works as chief athlete officer for the 2028 Summer Olympics organizing committee.

== Swim style and technique ==
Evans was known for her unorthodox "windmill" stroke and her cardio-respiratory reserves. She had a higher stroke count than many distance swimmers, taking 55 strokes per 50 meters, when other distance swimmers took closer to 40. Her endurance was at least partly a product of her training. In July 1986, at the height of her training, she was reputed to have often completed as much as 13,000 meters in a day of workouts, the equivalent of 8 miles. Slight of build and short of stature, she more than once found herself competing and winning against bigger and stronger athletes, some of whom were subsequently found to have been using performance-enhancing drugs.

== Honors ==
Janet Evans was the 1989 recipient of the James E. Sullivan Award as the top amateur athlete in the United States. She was named the Female World Swimmer of the Year by Swimming World Magazine in 1987, 1989, and 1990. In 1988, as a junior in high school, she was recognized as a "Rising Star" by the Los Angeles Times. Evans was inducted into the International Swimming Hall of Fame as an "Honor Swimmer" in 2001. In 1995, Evans was inducted into the U.S. Olympic Hall of Fame.

== Personal life ==
Evans married Bill Willson in Long Beach in 2004, with whom she has two children.

== See also ==
- List of members of the International Swimming Hall of Fame
- List of multiple Olympic gold medalists
- List of Olympic medalists in swimming (women)
- List of World Aquatics Championships medalists in swimming (women)
- World record progression 400 metres freestyle
- World record progression 800 metres freestyle
- World record progression 1500 metres freestyle

Records
Preceded by Tracey Wickham; Anke Möhring	Women's 800-meter freestyle world record-holder (long course); July 27, 1987 – August 19, 1987; March 22, 1988 – August 16, 2008	Succeeded by Anke Möhring; Rebecca Adlington
Preceded by Kim Linehan	Women's 1,500-meter freestyle world record-holder (long course); July 31, 1987 – June 17, 2007	Succeeded by Kate Ziegler
Preceded by Tracey Wickham	Women's 400-meter freestyle world record-holder (long course); December 20, 1987 – May 12, 2006	Succeeded by Laure Manaudou
Awards and achievements
Preceded by Kristin Otto; Kristin Otto	Swimming World; World Swimmer of the Year; 1987; 1989–1990	Succeeded by Kristin Otto; Krisztina Egerszegi
Preceded by Mary T. Meagher	Swimming World; American Swimmer of the Year; 1987–1991	Succeeded by Summer Sanders
