= Karyn Faure =

French swimmer

Personal information
- Born: 5 May 1969 (age 57) Cannes, France

Sport
- Sport: Swimming

Karyn Faure (born 5 May 1969) is a French swimmer. She competed in the women's 800 metre freestyle at the 1988 Summer Olympics.
