= 1993 FINA World Swimming Championships (25 m) – Women's 400 metre freestyle =

The finals and the qualifying heats of the Women's 400 metres Freestyle event at the 1993 FINA Short Course World Championships were held in Palma de Mallorca, Spain.

== Finals ==
RANK	FINAL A	TIME
	Janet Evans (USA)	4:05.64
	Trina Jackson (USA)	4:07.49
	Julie Majer (AUS)	4:07.91
4.	Sachiko Miyaji (JPN)	4:08.05
5.	Malin Nilsson (SWE)	4:08.09
6.	Tami Bruce (AUS)	4:08.98
7.	Joanne Malar (CAN)	4:09.05
8.	Jana Henke (GER)	4:13.32

== Qualifying heats ==
RANK	HEATS RANKING	TIME
1.	Trina Jackson (USA)	4:09.12
2.	Janet Evans (USA)	4:09.72
3.	Julie Majer (AUS)	4:10.18
4.	Tami Bruce (AUS)	4:10.73
5.	Sachiko Miyaji (JPN)	4:11.04
6.	Joanne Malar (CAN)	4:11.10
7.	Malin Nilsson (SWE)	4:11.57
8.	Jana Henke (GER)	4:16.88

== See also ==
- 1992 Women's Olympic Games 400m Freestyle
- 1993 Men's European LC Championships 400m Freestyle
