= David Connor (sailor) =

Australian sailor

Personal information
- Nationality: Australian
- Born: 31 July 1962 (age 62)

Sport
- Sport: Sailing

David Connor (born 31 July 1962) is an Australian sailor. He competed in the Flying Dutchman event at the 1988 Summer Olympics.
