= Hans Schelling =

Dutch sailor (1954–2008)

Personal information
- Full name: Johannes Schelling
- Nationality: Dutch
- Born: 27 October 1954 Leiderdorp, Netherlands
- Died: 20 May 2008 (aged 53) Zoetermeer, Netherlands
- Height: 1.88 m (6.2 ft)

Sailing career
- Sport: Sailing
- Class: Flying Dutchman
Competition record
Sailing
Representing Netherlands
Olympic Games
1988 Pusan	Flying Dutchman
- Updated on 2014-01-31

Johannes "Hans" Schelling (27 October 1954, Leiderdorp – 20 May 2008, Zoetermeer) was a sailor from the Netherlands, who represented his country at the 1988 Summer Olympics in Pusan. With Henry Koning as helmsman, Schelling took the 15th place in the Flying Dutchman.

== Sources ==
- "Hans Schelling Bio, Stats, and Results". Olympic Sports. Sports-Reference.com. Archived from the original on 2020-04-18.
- "De Nederlandse olympische zeilploeg". De Telegraaf (in Dutch). 1988-09-10.
- "Nederlandse zeilploeg met lege handen naar huis". De Telegraaf (in Dutch). 1988-09-28.
- Official Report, Volume 1: Organization and Planning (PDF). Seoul: Olympic Organizing Committee. 1989. Archived from the original (PDF) on March 4, 2016.
- Official Report, Volume 2: Competition, Summary and Results (PDF). Seoul: Seoul Olympic Organizing Committee. 1989. Archived from the original (PDF) on October 7, 2013.
