= Henry Koning =

Dutch sailor (born 1960)

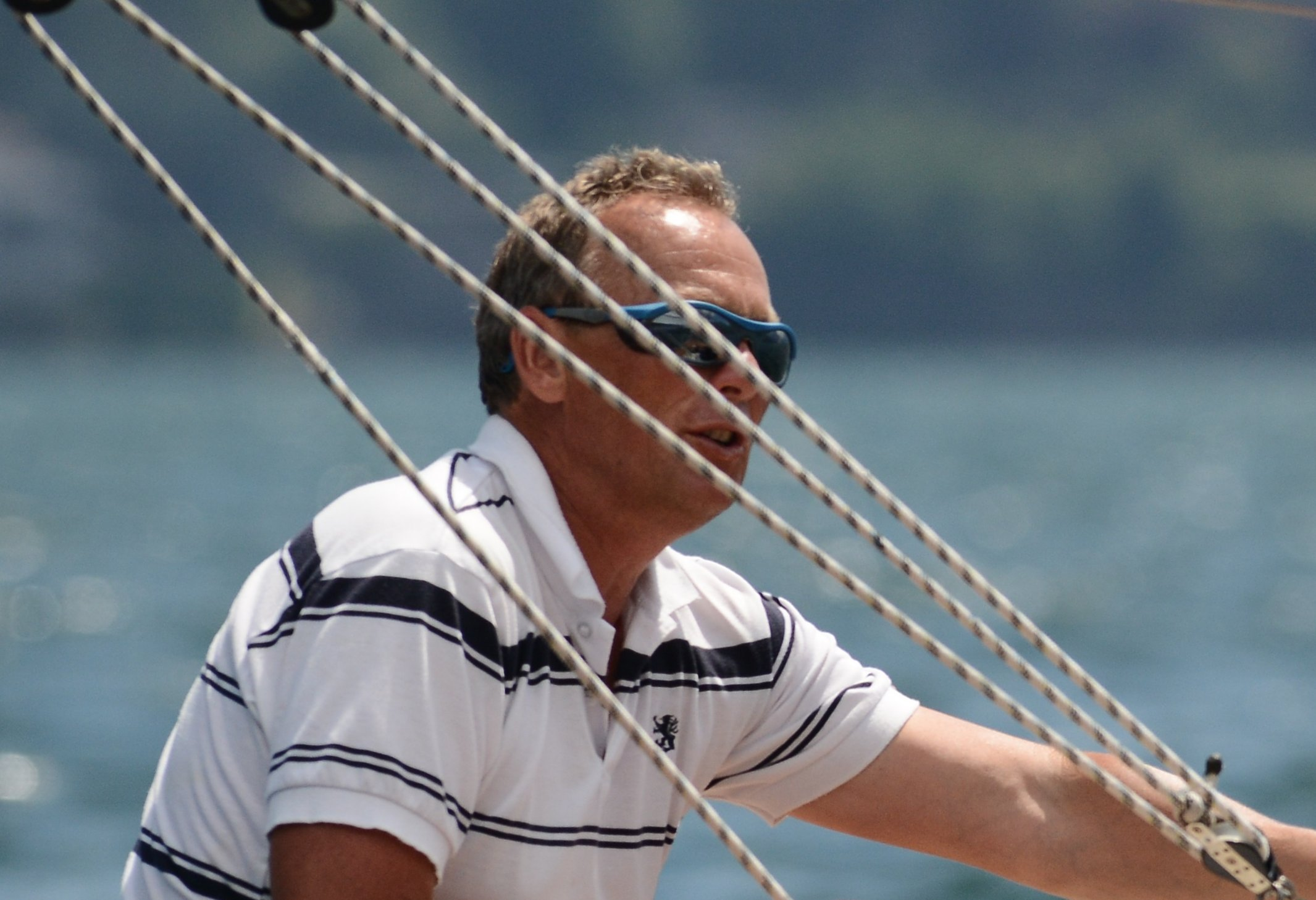
- Koning during the 2012 Vintage Yachting Games at Lake Como

Personal information
- Full name: Henry Arthur Koning
- Nationality: Dutch
- Born: 29 June 1960 (age 66) Zaandam, Netherlands
- Height: 1.70 m (5.6 ft)

Sailing career
- Sport: Sailing
- Class: Flying Dutchman
Competition record
Representing Netherlands
Olympic Games
	1988 Pusan	Flying Dutchman
Representing Netherlands Antilles
Vintage Yachting Games
4th	2008 Medemblik	Flying Dutchman
4th	2012 Lake Como	Flying Dutchman
- Updated on 2014-01-31

Henry Arthur Koning (born 29 June 1960 in Zaandam) is a sailor from the Netherlands, who represented his country at the 1988 Summer Olympics in Pusan. With Hans Schelling as crew, Koning took the 15th place in the Flying Dutchman.

Koning represented Bonaire during the 2008 Vintage Yachting Games in Medemblik in the Flying Dutchman with Rob Taal as crew. The team made 4th place. In the 2012 Koning and Taal returned to the Vintage Yachting Games in Lake Como also for Bonaire. They finished again 4th.

== Professional life ==
Koning works as organizational consultant for the community of Purmerend.

== Sources ==
- "Henry Koning Bio, Stats, and Results". Olympic Sports. Sports-Reference.com. Archived from the original on 2014-01-10.
- "De Nederlandse olympische zeilploeg". De Telegraaf (in Dutch). 1988-09-10.
- "Nederlandse zeilploeg met lege handen naar huis". De Telegraaf (in Dutch). 1988-09-28.
- Official Report, Volume 1: Organization and Planning (PDF). Seoul: Olympic Organizing Committee. 1989. Archived from the original (PDF) on March 4, 2016.
- Official Report, Volume 2: Competition, Summary and Results (PDF). Seoul: Seoul Olympic Organizing Committee. 1989. Archived from the original (PDF) on October 7, 2013.
- "Henry Koning". www.linkedin.com.
