= Roger Yeoman =

British sailor

Personal information
- Nationality: British
- Born: 15 January 1957 (age 68); Cardiff, Wales

Sport
- Sport: Sailing

Roger Yeoman (born 15 January 1957) is a British sailor. He competed in the Flying Dutchman event at the 1988 Summer Olympics.
