= Daniel Schroff =

Swiss sailor

Personal information
- Nationality: Swiss
- Born: 13 October 1960 (age 64)

Sport
- Sport: Sailing

Daniel Schroff (born 13 October 1960) is a Swiss sailor. He competed in the Flying Dutchman event at the 1988 Summer Olympics.
