= Erik Bjørkum =

Norwegian sailor (born 1965)

Personal information
- Born: 26 February 1965 (age 61) Sandefjord
- Height: 188 cm (6 ft 2 in)
- Weight: 83 kg (183 lb)

Sailing career
- Sport: Sailing
- Club: Sandefjord Seilforening
- Class: Flying Dutchman
Medal record
Sailing
Representing Norway
Olympic Games
Silver medal – second place	1988 Seoul	Flying Dutchman

Erik Bjørkum (born 26 February 1965) is a Norwegian sailor and Olympic medallist, born in Sandefjord. He received a silver medal in the Flying Dutchman class at the 1988 Summer Olympics in Seoul, together with Ole Petter Pollen. Bjørkum and Pollen won a silver medal at the 1988 European Championships, and a bronze medal at the 1989 Flying Dutchman World Championship.

Bjørkum resides at Høvik.
