= Gary Smith (sailor) =

Australian sailor

Personal information
- Nationality: Australian
- Born: 26 June 1952 (age 72)

Sport
- Sport: Sailing

Gary Smith (born 26 June 1952) is an Australian sailor. He competed in the Flying Dutchman event at the 1988 Summer Olympics.
