= Timothy Parsons (sailor) =

Hong Kong sailor

Personal information
- Nationality: Hong Konger
- Born: 14 February 1952 (age 73)

Sport
- Sport: Sailing

Timothy Parsons (born 14 February 1952) is a Hong Kong sailor. He competed in the Flying Dutchman event at the 1988 Summer Olympics.
