= Sailing at the 1988 Summer Olympics =

Coordinates: 35°9′32″N 129°8′18″E

Sailing at the Games of the XXIV Olympiad
- Venues: Busan 부산
- Dates: First race: 20 September 1988; Last race: 27 September 1988
- Competitors: 375 (331 male, 44 female) from 60 nations
- Boats: 214

Sailing/Yachting is an Olympic sport starting from the 1896 Olympics in Athens, Greece. With the exception of 1904 and possibly the canceled 1916 Summer Olympics, sailing has always been included on the Olympic schedule. The Sailing program of 1988 consisted of a total of eight sailing classes (disciplines). For each class seven races were scheduled from 20 September 1988 to 27 September 1988 of the coast of Busan and was the first time that a separate event was allocated exclusively for women (sailed in the 470 class). The sailing was done on the triangular type Olympic courses.

== Venue ==
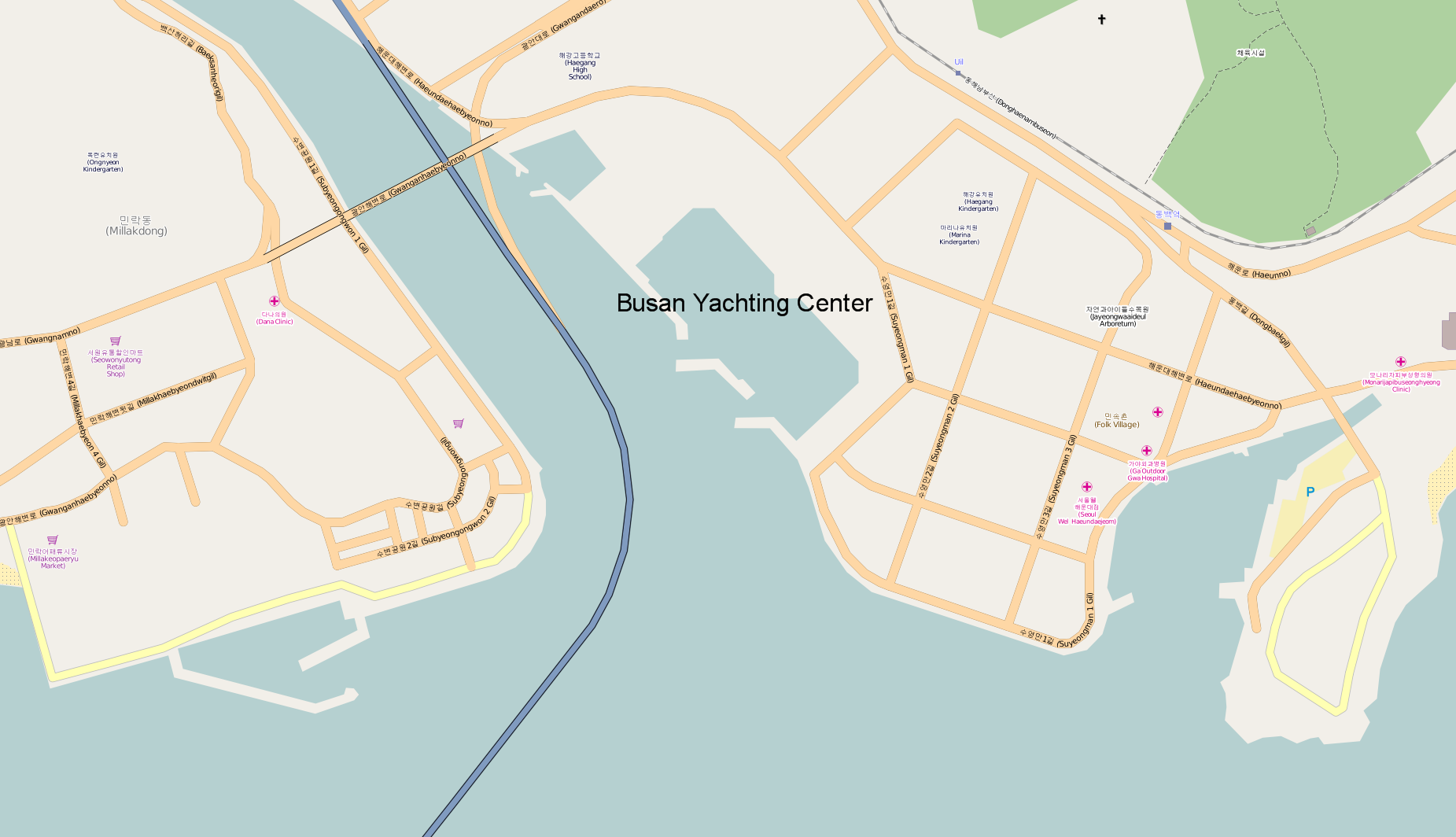
Busan Yachting Center

According to the IOC statutes the contests in all sport disciplines must be held either in, or as close as possible to the city which the IOC has chosen. Since the sailing conditions of the coast near Seoul are not very suitable for Olympic sailing Busan was chosen for the 1988 Sailing event. A total of two race areas were created of the coast of Busan.

Busan in Korea was reportedly a light wind venue but no one realised until too late that this information came from the airport which was located in a sheltered valley. It turned out to be that the 1988 Olympic Games were one of the windiest ever with one day of racing postponed due to too much wind. One day of racing saw around 30 knots of wind with 5 knots of current going against the wind. There was a lot of equipment damage and rescues for many classes resulting in many sailors did not finish and requests for redress.

== Competition ==
=== Overview ===
Continents	Countries	Classes	Boats	Male	Female
5	60	8	214	331	44

=== Continents ===
- Africa
- Asia
- Oceania
- Europe
- Americas

=== Countries ===
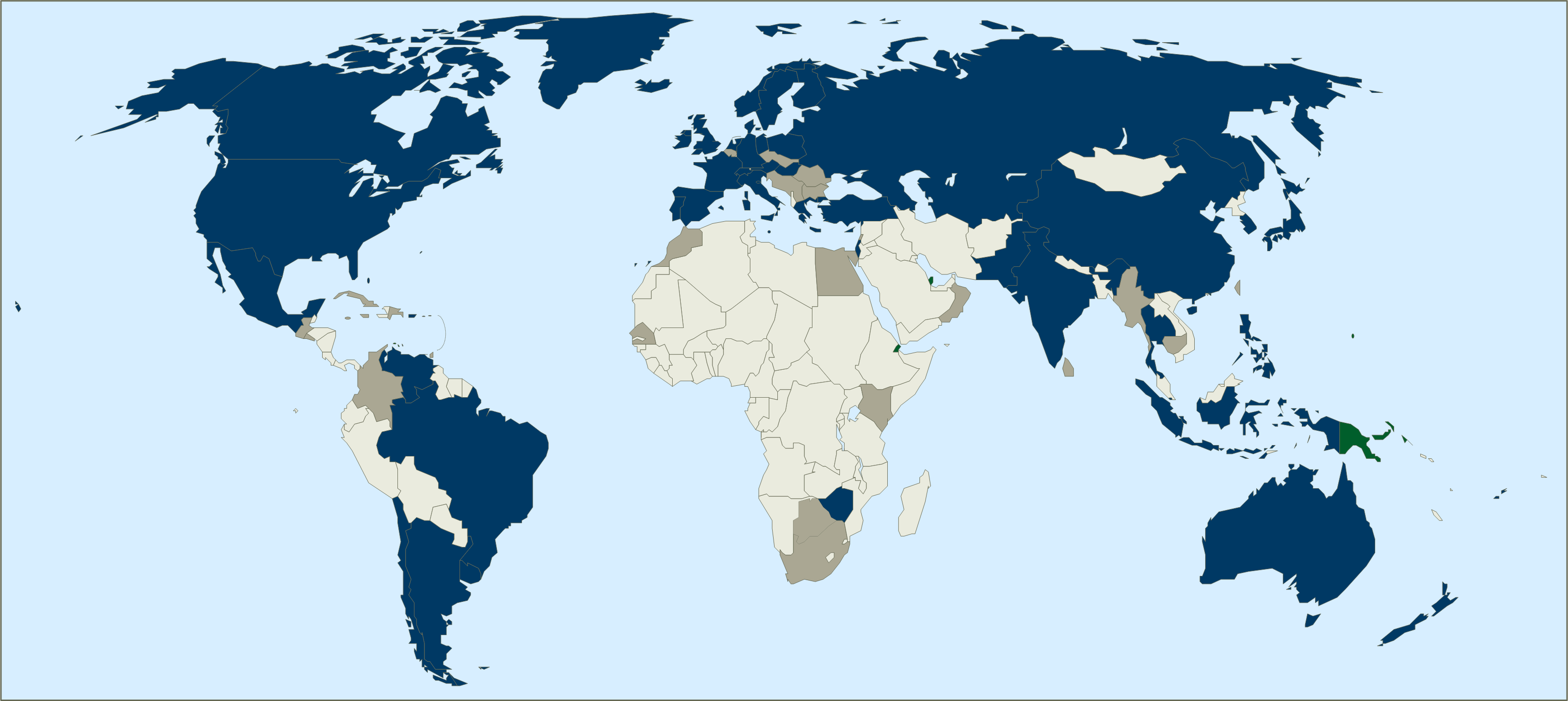
Countries that participated in the Sailing event of the 1988 Olympic Games. Blue: Water Gray: Never participated in OG Dark Gray: Participated in earlier OG Green: Country participated for the first time Dark Blue: Country participated also on previous games Red: Country boycotted the sailing event of the OG

Netherlands Antilles	Antigua and Barbuda	Argentina
Australia	Austria	Bahamas
Barbados	Bermuda	Brazil
Canada	Chile	China
Cyprus	Denmark	Djibouti
Spain	Fiji	Finland
France	West Germany	Great Britain
East Germany	Greece	Guam
Hong Kong	Hungary	Indonesia
India	Ireland	Iceland
Israel	Virgin Islands	Italy
British Virgin Islands	Japan	South Korea
Mexico	Malta	Monaco
Netherlands	Norway	New Zealand
Pakistan	Philippines	Papua New Guinea
Poland	Portugal	Puerto Rico
Qatar	Singapore	San Marino
Switzerland	Sweden	Thailand
Turkey	Soviet Union	Uruguay
United States	Venezuela	Zimbabwe

=== Classes (equipment) ===
Class	Type	Event	Sailors	Trapeze	Mainsail	Jib/Genoa	Spinnaker	First OG	Olympics so far
Division II	Surfboard		1	0	+	-	-	1988	1
Finn	Dinghy		1	0	+	-	-	1952	10
470	Dinghy		2	1	+	+	+	1988	1
470	Dinghy		2	1	+	+	+	1976	4
Flying Dutchman	Dinghy		2	1	+	+	+	1960	7
Tornado	Catamaran		2	1	+	+	-	1976	4
Star	Keelboat		2	0	+	+	-	1932	12
Soling	Keelboat		3	0	+	+	+	1972	5

1988 Olympic Classes designs

== Medal summary ==
=== Women's event ===
Games	Gold	Silver	Bronze
1988: Women's 470	United States (USA); Allison Jolly; Lynne Jewell	Sweden (SWE); Marit Söderström; Birgitta Bengtsson	Soviet Union (URS); Larisa Moskalenko; Iryna Chunykhovska

=== Men's event ===
Games	Gold	Silver	Bronze
1988: Men's Division II	New Zealand (NZL); Bruce Kendall	Netherlands Antilles (AHO); Jan Boersma	United States (USA); Mike Gebhardt
1988: Finn	Spain (ESP); Jose Doreste	Virgin Islands (ISV); Peter Holmberg	New Zealand (NZL); John Cutler
1988: Men's 470	France (FRA); Thierry Peponnet; Luc Pillot	Soviet Union (URS); Tõnu Tõniste; Toomas Tõniste	United States (USA); John Shadden; Charles McKee

=== Open events ===
Games	Gold	Silver	Bronze
1988: Flying Dutchman	Denmark (DEN); Jørgen Bojsen-Møller; Christian Grønborg	Norway (NOR); Ole Pollen; Erik Bjørkum	Canada (CAN); Frank McLaughlin; John Millen
1988: Tornado	France (FRA); Jean Le Deroff; Nicolas Hénard	New Zealand (NZL); Chris Timms; Rex Sellers	Brazil (BRA); Lars Grael; Clinio Freitas
1988: Star	Great Britain (GBR); Michael McIntyre; Bryn Vaile	United States (USA); Mark Reynolds; Harold Haenel	Brazil (BRA); Torben Grael; Nelson Falcão
1988: Soling	East Germany (GDR); Jochen Schümann; Thomas Flach; Bernd Jäkel	United States (USA); John Kostecki; William Baylis; Robert Billingham	Denmark (DEN); Jesper Bank; Jan Mathiasen; Steen Secher

== Medal table ==
Rank	Nation	Gold	Silver	Bronze	Total
1	France	2	0	0	2
2	United States	1	2	2	5
3	New Zealand	1	1	1	3
4	Denmark	1	0	1	2
5	East Germany	1	0	0	1
5	Great Britain	1	0	0	1
5	Spain	1	0	0	1
8	Soviet Union	0	1	1	2
9	Netherlands Antilles	0	1	0	1
9	Norway	0	1	0	1
9	Sweden	0	1	0	1
9	Virgin Islands	0	1	0	1
13	Brazil	0	0	2	2
14	Canada	0	0	1	1
Totals (14 entries)		8	8	8	24

== Remarks ==
=== Sailing ===
For the first time, a female-specific event, Women's 470, was on the program. Prior to this, all events were open to both men and women. Allison Jolly and Lynne Jewell of the USA won the event.

=== Sailors ===
During the Sailing regattas at the 1988 Summer Olympics among others the following persons were competing in the various classes:

- Denmark, Paul Elvstrøm
Sailors at the 1988 Olympic Games
In 470:
Luis Doreste.

== Sources ==
- "Olympic Medal Winners". International Olympic Committee.
