= Christian Toft =

Danish swimmer

Personal information
- Nationality: Danish
- Born: 14 December 1968 (age 57) Glostrup, Denmark

Sport
- Sport: Swimming

Christian Toft (born 14 December 1968) is a Danish breaststroke swimmer. He competed in two events at the 1988 Summer Olympics.
