= Eva Mortensen =

Danish swimmer

Personal information
- Born: 12 September 1970 (age 55) Palo Alto, California, United States

Sport
- Sport: Swimming

Eva Mortensen (born 12 September 1970) is a Danish swimmer. She competed in the women's 400 metre freestyle and women's 800 metre freestyle events at the 1988 Summer Olympics.
