= Vagn Høgholm =

Danish swimmer

Personal information
- Nationality: Danish
- Born: 24 September 1965 (age 60) Virum, Denmark

Sport
- Sport: Swimming

Vagn Høgholm (born 24 September 1965) is a Danish swimmer. He competed in the men's 50 metre freestyle and men's 4 × 100 metre freestyle relay events at the 1988 Summer Olympics.
