= Andrew Goldman =

American sailor

Personal information
- Born: November 21, 1966 (age 59) New York, New York, United States

Sport
- Sport: Sailing

Andrew Goldman (born November 21, 1966) is an American sailor. He competed in the Flying Dutchman event at the 1988 Summer Olympics.
