= Anke Möhring =

East German swimmer

Personal information
- Nationality: East German
- Born: 28 August 1969 (age 56) Magdeburg, East Germany
- Height: 5 ft 11 in (180 cm)
- Weight: 152 lb (69 kg)

Sport
- Sport: Swimming
- Strokes: Freestyle
- Club: Sportclub Magdeburg
Medal record
Women's swimming
Representing East Germany
Olympic Games
Bronze medal – third place	1988 Seoul	400 m freestyle
European Championships (LC)
Gold medal – first place	1987 Strasbourg	800 m freestyle
Gold medal – first place	1987 Strasbourg	4 × 200 m freestyle
Gold medal – first place	1989 Bonn	400 m freestyle
Gold medal – first place	1989 Bonn	800 m freestyle
Gold medal – first place	1989 Bonn	4 × 200 m freestyle
Silver medal – second place	1985 Sofia	400 m freestyle
Bronze medal – third place	1985 Sofia	800 m freestyle

Anke Möhring (born 28 August 1969) is a former freestyle swimmer from East Germany, who won the bronze medal in the 400 m freestyle at the 1988 Summer Olympics in Seoul, South Korea. She was named Swimming World's European Swimmers of the Year in 1989.

== See also ==
- List of German records in swimming

Records
Preceded by Janet Evans	Women's 800 metre freestyle world record holder (long course); 19 August 1987 – 22 March 1988	Succeeded by Janet Evans
Awards
Preceded by Kristin Otto	European Swimmer of the Year; 1989	Succeeded by Krisztina Egerszegi
