= Annette Jørgensen =

Danish swimmer

Personal information
- Born: 25 April 1966 (age 60) Thisted, Denmark

Sport
- Sport: Swimming

Annette Jørgensen (born 25 April 1966) is a Danish swimmer. She competed in three events at the 1988 Summer Olympics.
