= Peter Rohde (swimmer) =

Danish swimmer

Personal information
- Nationality: Danish
- Born: 10 January 1965 (age 61) Glostrup, Denmark

Sport
- Sport: Swimming

Peter Rohde (born 10 January 1965) is a Danish freestyle and medley swimmer. He competed at the 1984 Summer Olympics and the 1988 Summer Olympics.
