= John McQuaid (cyclist) =

Irish cyclist

Personal information
- Born: 24 May 1960 (age 66)

Cycling career
- Sport: Cycling

John McQuaid (born 24 May 1960) is an Irish former cyclist. He competed in the road race at the 1988 Summer Olympics.
