= Pernille Jensen =

Danish swimmer

Personal information
- Born: 15 April 1973 (age 53) Esbjerg, Denmark

Sport
- Sport: Swimming

Pernille Jensen (born 15 April 1973) is a Danish swimmer.

She competed in the women's 400 metre freestyle and women's 800 metre freestyle events at the 1988 Summer Olympics.
