= Pia Sørensen =

Danish swimmer

Personal information
- Born: 14 June 1967 (age 59) Hillerød, Denmark

Sport
- Sport: Swimming

Pia Sørensen (born 14 June 1967) is a Danish swimmer. She competed in four events at the 1988 Summer Olympics.
