= O Jong-yeol =

South Korean sailor

Personal information
- Nationality: South Korean
- Born: 2 October 1961 (age 63)
- Height: 180 cm (5 ft 11 in)
- Weight: 72 kg (159 lb)

Sport
- Sport: Sailing

O Jong-yeol (Korean: 오종열, also known as Oh Jong-yul or Oh Jong-jul, born 2 October 1961) is a South Korean sailor. He competed in the Flying Dutchman event at the 1988 Summer Olympics.
