= Alexandra Russ =

German swimmer

Personal information
- Born: 1 May 1970 (age 56) Fulda, West Germany

Sport
- Sport: Swimming

Alexandra Russ (born 1 May 1970) is a German former swimmer. She competed in two events at the 1988 Summer Olympics representing West Germany.
