= Christelle Janssens =

Belgian swimmer

Personal information
- Born: 26 February 1972 (age 54) Arlon, Belgium

Sport
- Sport: Swimming

Christelle Janssens (born 26 February 1972) is a Belgian former freestyle swimmer. She competed in two events at the 1988 Summer Olympics.
