= Cécile Prunier =

French swimmer

Personal information
- Nationality: French
- Born: 28 August 1969 (age 56) Paris, France

Sport
- Sport: Swimming
Medal record
Representing France
Mediterranean Games
Bronze medal – third place	1987 Latakia	200m freestyle

Cécile Prunier (born 28 August 1969) is a French freestyle swimmer. She competed in three events at the 1988 Summer Olympics.
