= Tracey Atkin =

British swimmer

Personal information
- Born: 14 August 1971 (age 54) Lincoln, England

Sport
- Sport: Swimming

Tracey Ann Atkin (born 14 August 1971) is a female retired British swimmer. Atkin competed in two events at the 1988 Summer Olympics. At the ASA National British Championships she won the 400 metres medley title in 1988.
