= Jan Larsen (swimmer) =

Danish swimmer

Personal information
- Born: 16 November 1967 (age 58) Herning, Denmark

Sport
- Sport: Swimming

Jan Larsen (born 16 November 1967) is a Danish butterfly and freestyle swimmer. He competed in three events at the 1988 Summer Olympics.
