= Franz Mortensen =

Danish swimmer

Personal information
- Born: 16 February 1964 (age 62) Copenhagen, Denmark

Sport
- Sport: Swimming

Franz Mortensen (born 16 February 1964) is a Danish freestyle swimmer. He competed at the 1984, 1988 and the 1992 Summer Olympics.
