= Stephen Cullen =

Irish swimmer

Personal information
- Born: 9 November 1970 (age 55)

Sport
- Sport: Swimming

Stephen Cullen (born 9 November 1970) is an Irish swimmer. He competed in three events at the 1988 Summer Olympics.
