= Diana Petkova =

Bulgarian swimmer (born 2000)

Personal information
- Nationality: Bulgarian
- Born: 10 June 2000 (age 26) Plovdiv, Bulgaria

Sport
- Sport: Swimming
- College team: University of Alabama

Diana Petkova (Bulgarian: Диана Петкова; born 10 June 2000) is a Bulgarian swimmer. She competed at the 2020 Summer Olympics, in Women's 100 m breaststroke, and Women's 200 m individual medley.

== Life ==
She studied at University of Alabama. She competed in the women's 50 metre freestyle event at the 2018 FINA World Swimming Championships (25 m), in Hangzhou, China.
