= Jørgen Bojsen-Møller =

Danish sailor (born 1954)

Medal record

Men's sailing

Representing Denmark

Olympic Games
Gold medal – first place	1988 Seoul	Flying Dutchman
Bronze medal – third place	1992 Barcelona	Flying Dutchman

Jørgen Bojsen-Møller (born 17 April 1954 in Stege, Denmark) is a Danish sailor and Olympic champion. He competed at the 1988 Summer Olympics in Seoul and won a gold medal in the Flying Dutchman class, together with Christian Grønborg. At the 1992 Summer Olympics in Barcelona he received a bronze medal in the Flying Dutchman, together with his cousin Jens Bojsen-Møller.
