= Christian Grønborg =

Danish sailor

Medal record

Men's sailing

Representing Denmark

Olympic Games
Gold medal – first place	1988 Seoul	Flying Dutchman

Christian Grønborg (born 29 June 1962 in Sorø, Denmark) is a Danish sailor and Olympic champion. He competed at the 1988 Summer Olympics in Seoul and won a gold medal in the Flying Dutchman class, together with Jørgen Bojsen-Møller.

At club level he was a part of Vallensbæk Sejlklub.
