= Annette Poulsen =

Danish swimmer (born 1969)

Personal information
- Born: 29 July 1969 (age 57) Maglegård, Gentofte, Denmark
- Height: 1.70 m (5 ft 7 in)
- Weight: 56 kg (123 lb)

Sport
- Sport: Swimming
- Club: Herlev Idrætsforening/Albertslund Idrætsforening
Medal record
Women's swimming
Representing Denmark
World Championships
Bronze medal – third place	1991 Perth	4×200 m freestyle
European Championships
Gold medal – first place	1991 Athens	4×200 m freestyle

Annette Poulsen (born 29 July 1969) is a Danish retired swimmer who won two medals in the 4 × 200 m freestyle relay at the World and European championships in 1991. She also competed at the 1988 and 1992 Summer Olympics in four events; her best achievement was sixth place in the 4 × 100 m freestyle relay in 1992.
