= Tomomi Hosoda =

Japanese swimmer (born 1971)

Personal information
- Born: June 30, 1971 (age 55)

Sport
- Sport: Swimming
Medal record
Representing Japan
Asian Games
Bronze medal – third place	1990 Beijing	800m freestyle

Tomomi Hosoda (細田 朋美, Hosoda Tomomi; born 30 June 1971) is a Japanese former freestyle swimmer who competed in the 1988 Summer Olympics.
