= Richard Gheel =

Irish swimmer

Personal information
- Born: 13 November 1968 (age 57)

Sport
- Sport: Swimming

Richard Gheel (born 13 November 1968) is an Irish former swimmer. He competed in three events at the 1988 Summer Olympics.
