= Peter Kennedy (sailor) =

Irish sailor

Personal information
- Nationality: Irish
- Born: 3 May 1964 (age 61); Belfast, Northern Ireland

Sport
- Sport: Sailing

Peter Kennedy (born 3 May 1964) is an Irish sailor. He competed at the 1988 Summer Olympics and the 1992 Summer Olympics.
