= Yan Ming (swimmer) =

Chinese swimmer (born 1969)

Personal information
- Nationality: Chinese
- Born: 6 December 1969 (age 56)

Sport
- Sport: Swimming
Medal record
Representing China
Summer Universiade
Bronze medal – third place	1987 Zagreb	800m freestyle
Asian Games
Gold medal – first place	1986 Seoul	400m freestyle
Gold medal – first place	1986 Seoul	800m freestyle
Gold medal – first place	1986 Seoul	400m individual medley
Gold medal – first place	1990 Beijing	400m freestyle
Gold medal – first place	1990 Beijing	800m freestyle
Silver medal – second place	1990 Beijing	400m individual medley

Yan Ming (born 6 December 1969) is a Chinese swimmer who competed at the 1988 and 1992 Summer Olympics.
