= Antoaneta Strumenlieva =

Bulgarian swimmer

Personal information
- Born: 26 June 1968 (age 58) Plovdiv, Bulgaria

Sport
- Sport: Swimming

Antoaneta Strumenlieva (Bulgarian: Антоанета Струменлиева, born 26 June 1968) is a Bulgarian swimmer. She competed in three events at the 1988 Summer Olympics.
