= Fencing at the 1980 Summer Olympics – Men's sabre =

Fencing at the Olympics

Men's sabre at the Games of the XXII Olympiad
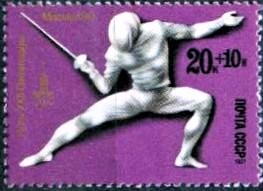
- Soviet stamp commemorating 1980 Olympic fencing
- Venue: CSKA Sports Complex
- Dates: 24–25 July 1980
- Competitors: 30 from 12 nations

Medalists
1st place, gold medalist(s)		Viktor Krovopuskov	Soviet Union
2nd place, silver medalist(s)		Mikhail Burtsev	Soviet Union
3rd place, bronze medalist(s)		Imre Gedővári	Hungary

The men's sabre was one of eight fencing events on the fencing at the 1980 Summer Olympics programme. It was the nineteenth appearance of the event. The competition was held from 24 to 25 July 1980. 30 fencers from 12 nations competed. Nations had been limited to three fencers each since 1928. The event was won by defending champion Viktor Krovopuskov of the Soviet Union, the nation's third consecutive victory in the event (a streak that would be broken by the Soviet-led boycott four years later). Krovopuskov was the third man to successfully defend a sabre title and the 10th man to win two medals of any color in the event. His teammate Mikhail Burtsev took silver. Imre Gedővári's bronze medal returned Hungary to the podium after a one-Games absence broke an eleven-Games streak.

== Background ==
This was the 19th appearance of the event, which is the only fencing event to have been held at every Summer Olympics. Five of the six finalists from 1976 returned: gold medalist Viktor Krovopuskov of the Soviet Union, silver medalist (and 1972 bronze medalist) Vladimir Nazlymov of the Soviet Union, fourth-place finisher Ioan Pop of Romania, fifth-place finisher Mario Aldo Montano of Italy, and sixth-place finisher Michele Maffei of Italy. Bronze medalist (and 1972 gold medalist) Viktor Sidyak's place on the Soviet team had been filled by Mikhail Burtsev. The three world championships since the last Games had been won by Hungarian Pál Gerevich (1977) and Soviets Krovopuskov (1978) and Nazlymov (1979), the latter of whom had also won in 1975. The American-led boycott had little effect on the top of the favorites list, with the Soviet Union dominating, other Eastern Bloc countries such as Hungary, Poland, Romania being perpetually strong (with Bulgarian twins Vasil Etropolski and Khristo Etropolski making a case to add that nation), and the strongest Western nation in the event (Italy) participating under the Olympic flag in partial support for the boycott. Indeed, the only nation that had ever won a men's sabre medal to boycott the 1980 Games was the United States—which had taken silver in St. Louis 1904.

Kuwait and East Germany each made their debut in the men's sabre. Italy made its 17th appearance in the event, most of any nation, having missed the inaugural 1896 event and the 1904 Olympics.

== Competition format ==
The 1980 tournament continued to use a mix of pool and knockout rounds. The competition included two pool rounds, followed by a double-elimination knockout round, finishing with a final pool round. In each pool round, the fencers competed in a round-robin.

Bouts in the round-robin pools were to 5 touches; bouts in the double-elimination round were to 10 touches. Repechages were not used in the first two rounds, but were used to determine medalists if necessary in the final.

== Schedule ==
All times are Moscow Time (UTC+3)

Date	Time	Round
Thursday, 24 July 1980		Round 1 Round 2
Friday, 25 July 1980		Elimination rounds Final

== Results ==
=== Round 1 ===
==== Round 1 Pool A ====
Pos	Fencer	W	L	TF	TA	Notes	IG	VE	JL	LJ	VP
1	Imre Gedővári (HUN)	4	0	20	12	Q		5–4	5–2	5–3	5–3
2	Vasil Etropolski (BUL)	2	2	18	16	Q	4–5		4–5	5–3	5–3
3	José Laverdecia (CUB)	2	2	16	18	Q	2–5	5–4		5–4	4–5
4	Leszek Jabłonowski (POL)	1	3	15	19	Q	3–5	3–5	4–5		5–4
5	Valentín Paraíso (ESP)	1	3	15	19		3–5	3–5	5–4	4–5	

Source: Official Report, vol. 3, p. 243

==== Round 1 Pool B ====
Pos	Fencer	W	L	TF	TA	Notes	VN	JO	JFL	MS	RM
1	Vladimir Nazlymov (URS)	3	1	19	12	Q		4–5	5–3	5–3	5–1
2	Jesús Ortiz (CUB)	3	1	16	14	Q	5–4		1–5	5–1	5–4
3	Jean-François Lamour (FRA)	2	2	16	13	Q	3–5	5–1		3–5	5–2
4	Mark Slade (GBR)	2	2	14	17	Q	3–5	1–5	5–3		5–4
5	Rüdiger Müller (GDR)	0	4	11	20		1–5	4–5	2–5	4–5	

Source: Official Report, vol. 3, p. 243

==== Round 1 Pool C ====
Pos	Fencer	W	L	TF	TA	Notes	GN	FEH	MM	GC	MO
1	György Nébald (HUN)	3	1	15	16	Q		0–5	5–4	5–4	5–3
2	Frank-Eberhard Höltje (GDR)	2	2	16	13	Q	5–0		5–3	3–5	3–5
3	Michele Maffei (ITA)	2	2	17	14	Q	4–5	3–5		5–1	5–3
4	Georgi Chomakov (BUL)	2	2	15	17	Q	4–5	5–3	1–5		5–4
5	Manuel Ortiz (CUB)	1	3	15	18		3–5	5–3	3–5	4–5	

Source: Official Report, vol. 3, p. 243

==== Round 1 Pool D ====
Pos	Fencer	W	L	TF	TA	Notes	KE	IP	VK	AK	AAA
1	Khristo Etropolski (BUL)	4	0	20	8	Q		5–4	5–3	5–0	5–1
2	Ioan Pop (ROU)	2	2	16	12	Q	4–5		5–2	2–5	5–0
3	Viktor Krovopuskov (URS)	2	2	15	12	Q	3–5	2–5		5–0	5–2
4	Andrzej Kostrzewa (POL)	2	2	10	12	Q	0–5	5–2	0–5		5–0
5	Ahmed Al-Ahmed (KUW)	0	4	3	20		1–5	0–5	2–5	0–5	

Source: Official Report, vol. 3, p. 243

==== Round 1 Pool E ====
Pos	Fencer	W	L	TF	TA	Notes	MAM	PU	CM	MB	ME
1	Mario Aldo Montano (ITA)	3	1	18	12	Q		5–3	5–4	3–5	5–0
2	Peter Ulbrich (GDR)	3	1	18	13	Q	3–5		5–3	5–4	5–1
3	Cornel Marin (ROU)	2	2	17	13	Q	4–5	3–5		5–3	5–0
4	Mikhail Burtsev (URS)	2	2	17	14	Q	5–3	4–5	3–5		5–1
5	Mohamed Eyiad (KUW)	0	4	2	20		0–5	1–5	0–5	1–5	

Source: Official Report, vol. 3, p. 243

==== Round 1 Pool F ====
Pos	Fencer	W	L	TF	TA	Notes	JB	FM	PG	MM	AAK
1	Jacek Bierkowski (POL)	4	0	20	10	Q		5–4	5–2	5–2	5–2
2	Ferdinando Meglio (ITA)	3	1	19	11	Q	4–5		5–4	5–2	5–0
3	Pál Gerevich (HUN)	2	2	16	13	Q	2–5	4–5		5–2	5–1
4	Marin Mustață (ROU)	1	3	11	15	Q	2–5	2–5	2–5		5–0
5	Ali Al-Khawajah (KUW)	0	4	3	20		2–5	0–5	1–5	0–5	

Source: Official Report, vol. 3, p. 243

=== Round 2 ===
==== Round 2 Pool A ====
Pos	Fencer	W	L	TF	TA	Notes	MMa	MB	GN	KE	JO	MMu
1	Michele Maffei (ITA)	5	0	25	15	Q		5–4	5–3	5–4	5–2	5–2
2	Mikhail Burtsev (URS)	4	1	24	13	Q	4–5		5–1	5–2	5–3	5–2
3	György Nébald (HUN)	3	2	19	18	Q	3–5	1–5		5–2	5–4	5–2
4	Khristo Etropolski (BUL)	1	4	17	22	Q	4–5	2–5	2–5		4–5	5–2
5	Jesús Ortiz (CUB)	1	4	18	24		2–5	3–5	4–5	5–4		4–5
6	Marin Mustață (ROU)	1	4	13	24		2–5	2–5	2–5	2–5	5–4	

Source: Official Report, vol. 3, p. 244

==== Round 2 Pool B ====
Pos	Fencer	W	L	TF	TA	Notes	JB	VE	PG	IP	LJ	PU
1	Jacek Bierkowski (POL)	4	1	24	14	Q		5–2	5–3	4–5	5–2	5–2
2	Vasil Etropolski (BUL)	3	2	18	15	Q	2–5		1–5	5–1	5–2	5–2
3	Pál Gerevich (HUN)	3	2	19	16	Q	3–5	5–1		1–5	5–4	5–1
4	Ioan Pop (ROU)	3	2	18	19	Q	5–4	1–5	5–1		2–5	5–4
5	Leszek Jabłonowski (POL)	2	3	18	20		2–5	2–5	4–5	5–2		5–3
6	Peter Ulbrich (GDR)	0	5	12	25		2–5	2–5	1–5	4–5	3–5	

Source: Official Report, vol. 3, p. 244

==== Round 2 Pool C ====
Pos	Fencer	W	L	TF	TA	Notes	VK	IG	CM	AK	MAM	MS
1	Viktor Krovopuskov (URS)	5	0	25	15	Q		5–4	5–1	5–2	5–4	5–4
2	Imre Gedővári (HUN)	4	1	24	16	Q	4–5		5–1	5–4	5–3	5–3
3	Cornel Marin (ROU)	3	2	17	16	Q	1–5	1–5		5–2	5–3	5–1
4	Andrzej Kostrzewa (POL)	2	3	18	20	Q	2–5	4–5	2–5		5–4	5–1
5	Mario Aldo Montano (ITA)	1	4	19	20		4–5	3–5	3–5	4–5		5–0
6	Mark Slade (GBR)	0	5	9	25		4–5	3–5	1–5	1–5	0–5	

Source: Official Report, vol. 3, p. 244

==== Round 2 Pool D ====
Pos	Fencer	W	L	TF	TA	Notes	VN	JL	FM	GC	FEH	JFL
1	Vladimir Nazlymov (URS)	5	0	25	19	Q		5–3	5–4	5–4	5–4	5–4
2	José Laverdecia (CUB)	3	2	22	18	Q	3–5		5–3	5–2	4–5	5–3
3	Ferdinando Meglio (ITA)	2	3	19	18	Q	4–5	3–5		2–5	5–3	5–0
4	Georgi Chomakov (BUL)	2	3	20	20	Q	4–5	2–5	5–2		5–3	4–5
5	Frank-Eberhard Höltje (GDR)	2	3	20	23		4–5	5–4	3–5	3–5		5–4
6	Jean-François Lamour (FRA)	1	4	16	24		4–5	3–5	0–5	5–4	4–5	

Source: Official Report, vol. 3, p. 244

=== Double elimination rounds ===
==== Winners brackets ====
===== Winners group 1 =====
Round of 16		Round of 8
Andrzej Kostrzewa (POL)	W
Jacek Bierkowski (POL)	L	Andrzej Kostrzewa (POL)	L
Khristo Etropolski (BUL)	W	Khristo Etropolski (BUL)	W
Ferdinando Meglio (ITA)	L

===== Winners group 2 =====
Round of 16		Round of 8
Pál Gerevich (HUN)	W
Michele Maffei (ITA)	L	Pál Gerevich (HUN)	L
Viktor Krovopuskov (URS)	10	Viktor Krovopuskov (URS)	W
Ioan Pop (ROU)	9

===== Winners group 3 =====
Round of 16		Round of 8
Vladimir Nazlymov (URS)	W
José Laverdecia (CUB)	L	Vladimir Nazlymov (URS)	L
Vasil Etropolski (BUL)	W	Vasil Etropolski (BUL)	W
György Nébald (HUN)	L

===== Winners group 4 =====
Round of 16		Round of 8
Mikhail Burtsev (URS)	W
Cornel Marin (ROU)	L	Mikhail Burtsev (URS)	L
Imre Gedővári (HUN)	W	Imre Gedővári (HUN)	W
Georgi Chomakov (BUL)	L

==== Losers brackets ====
===== Losers group 1 =====
Round of 4
Jacek Bierkowski (POL)	L
Ferdinando Meglio (ITA)	W
José Laverdecia (CUB)	W
György Nébald (HUN)	L

Round of 4
Ferdinando Meglio (ITA)	W
Pál Gerevich (HUN)	L
José Laverdecia (CUB)	L
Mikhail Burtsev (URS)	W

Round of 2
Ferdinando Meglio (ITA)	L
Mikhail Burtsev (URS)	W

===== Losers group 2 =====
Round of 4
Michele Maffei (ITA)	W
Ioan Pop (ROU)	L
Cornel Marin (ROU)	W
Georgi Chomakov (BUL)	L

Round of 4
Michele Maffei (ITA)	W
Andrzej Kostrzewa (POL)	L
Cornel Marin (ROU)	L
Vladimir Nazlymov (URS)	W

Round of 2
Michele Maffei (ITA)	W
Vladimir Nazlymov (URS)	L

=== Final round ===
Pos	Fencer	W	L	TF	TA	Notes	VK	MB	IG	VE	KE	MM
1	Viktor Krovopuskov (URS)	4	1	24	17	B		4–5	5–4	5–3	5–3	5–2
1	Mikhail Burtsev (URS)	4	1	23	18	B	5–4		3–5	5–3	5–3	5–3
3rd place, bronze medalist(s)	Imre Gedővári (HUN)	3	2	23	21		4–5	5–3		4–5	5–4	5–4
4	Vasil Etropolski (BUL)	2	3	17	23		3–5	3–5	5–4		5–4	1–5
5	Khristo Etropolski (BUL)	1	4	19	21		3–5	3–5	4–5	4–5		5–1
6	Michele Maffei (ITA)	1	4	15	21		2–5	3–5	4–5	5–1	1–5	

Source: Official Report, vol. 3, p. 245

Barrage

Pos	Fencer	W	L	TF	TA	VK	MB
1st place, gold medalist(s)	Viktor Krovopuskov (URS)	1	0	5	3		5–3
2nd place, silver medalist(s)	Mikhail Burtsev (URS)	0	1	3	5	3–5	

Source: Official Report, vol. 3, p. 245

== Final classification ==
Fencer	Nation
Viktor Krovopuskov	Soviet Union
Mikhail Burtsev	Soviet Union
Imre Gedővári	Hungary
Vasil Etropolski	Bulgaria
Khristo Etropolski	Bulgaria
Michele Maffei	Italy
Ferdinando Meglio	Italy
Vladimir Nazlymov	Soviet Union
Cornel Marin	Romania
Pál Gerevich	Hungary
Andrzej Kostrzewa	Poland
José Laverdecia	Cuba
Jacek Bierkowski	Poland
Ioan Pop	Romania
György Nébald	Hungary
Georgi Chomakov	Bulgaria
Leszek Jabłonowski	Poland
Frank-Eberhard Höltje	East Germany
Mario Aldo Montano	Italy
Jesús Ortiz	Cuba
Jean-François Lamour	France
Marin Mustață	Romania
Peter Ulbrich	East Germany
Mark Slade	Great Britain
Manuel Ortiz	Cuba
Valentín Paraíso	Spain
Rüdiger Müller	East Germany
Ahmed Al-Ahmed	Kuwait
Ali Al-Khawajah	Kuwait
Mohamed Eyiad	Kuwait
