= Fencing at the 1980 Summer Olympics =

Fencing at the Games of the XXII Olympiad

At the 1980 Summer Olympics in Moscow, eight events in fencing were contested. Men competed in both individual and team events for each of the three weapon types (épée, foil and sabre), but women competed only in foil events. They were held between July 22 and July 31 at the fencing hall of the Sports Complex of the Central Sports Club of the Army (north-western part of Moscow).

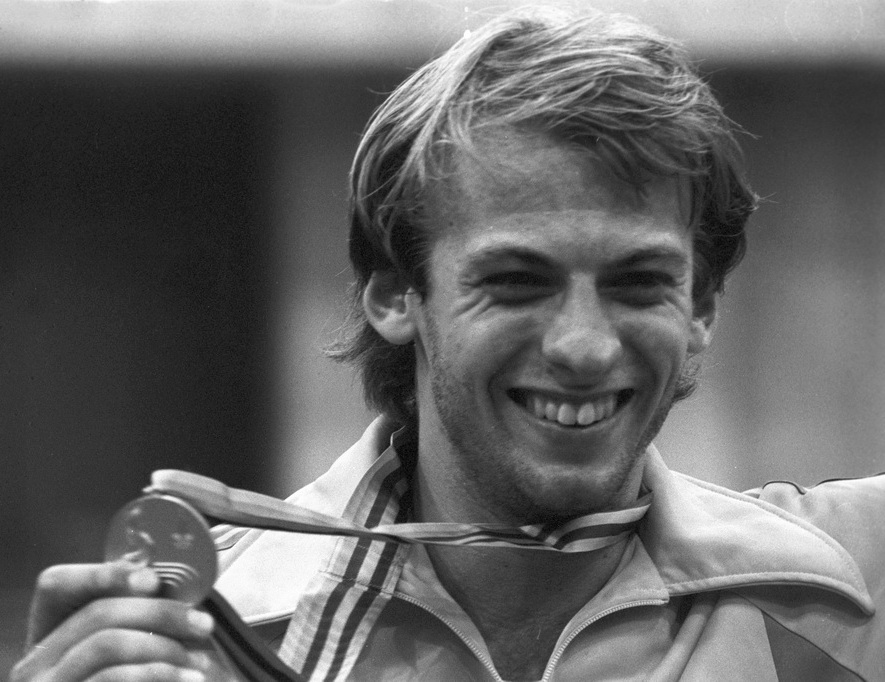
Johan Harmenberg during the victory ceremony. RIAN photo.

== Medal summary ==
=== Men's events ===
Games	Gold	Silver	Bronze
Individual épée	Johan Harmenberg; Sweden	Ernõ Kolczonay; Hungary	Philippe Riboud; France
team épée	France; Philippe Riboud; Patrick Picot; Hubert Gardas; Philippe Boisse; Michel Salesse	Poland; Piotr Jabłkowski; Andrzej Lis; Leszek Swornowski; Ludomir Chronowski; Mariusz Strzałka	Soviet Union; Ashot Karagian; Boris Lukomsky; Aleksander Abushackmetov; Aleksander Mozhaev; Vladimir Smirnov
Individual foil	Vladimir Smirnov; Soviet Union	Pascal Jolyot; France	Aleksander Romankov; Soviet Union
team foil	France; Didier Flament; Pascal Jolyot; Bruno Boscherie; Philippe Bonnin; Frederic Pietruszka	Soviet Union; Aleksander Romankov; Vladimir Smirnov; Sabirzhan Ruziev; Ashot Karagian; Vladimir Lapitsky	Poland; Adam Robak; Bogusław Zych; Lech Koziejowski; Marian Sypniewski
Individual sabre	Viktor Krovopuskov; Soviet Union	Mikhail Burtsev; Soviet Union	Imre Gedővári; Hungary
team sabre	Soviet Union; Mikhail Burtsev; Viktor Krovopuskov; Viktor Sidjak; Vladimir Nazlymov; Nikolay Alyokhin	Italy; Michele Maffei; Mario Aldo Montano; Marco Romano; Ferdinando Meglio; Giovanni Scalzo	Hungary; Imre Gedővári; Rudolf Nébald; Pál Gerevich; Ferenc Hammang; György Nébald

=== Women's events ===
Games	Gold	Silver	Bronze
individual foil	Pascale Trinquet; France	Magda Maros; Hungary	Barbara Wysoczańska; Poland
team foil	France; Brigitte Latrille-Gaudin; Pascale Trinquet; Isabelle Begard; Veronique Brouquier; Christine Muzio	Soviet Union; Valentina Sidorova; Nailia Giliazova; Elena Belova; Irina Ushakova; Larisa Tsagaraeva	Hungary; Ildikó Schwarczenberger; Magda Maros; Gertrúd Stefanek; Zsuzsanna Szőcs; Edit Kovács

== Medal table ==
Rank	Nation	Gold	Silver	Bronze	Total
1	France	4	1	1	6
2	Soviet Union	3	3	2	8
3	Sweden	1	0	0	1
4	Hungary	0	2	3	5
5	Poland	0	1	2	3
6	Italy	0	1	0	1
Totals (6 entries)		8	8	8	24

== Participating nations ==
A total of 182 fencers (133 men and 49 women) from 20 nations competed at the Moscow Games:

- Algeria (1)
- Australia (3)
- Belgium (3)
- Bulgaria (4)
- Cuba (12)
- Czechoslovakia (7)
- Denmark (1)
- East Germany (14)
- Finland (5)
- France (16)
- Great Britain (11)
- Hungary (18)
- Italy (13)
- Kuwait (9)
- Lebanon (2)
- Poland (18)
- Romania (18)
- Soviet Union (19)
- Spain (4)
- Sweden (6)
