= Fencing at the 1980 Summer Olympics – Men's team sabre =

Men's team sabre at the Games of the XXII Olympiad
- Venue: Central Army Sports Club Complex
- Dates: 28 – 29 July 1980
- Competitors: 63 from 8 nations

Medalists
1st place, gold medalist(s)		Viktor Sidyak; Vladimir Nazlymov; Viktor Krovopuskov; Mikhail Burtsev; Nikolay Alyokhin	Soviet Union
2nd place, silver medalist(s)		Mario Aldo Montano; Michele Maffei; Ferdinando Meglio; Marco Romano	Italy
3rd place, bronze medalist(s)		Imre Gedővári; Pál Gerevich; Ferenc Hammang; Rudolf Nébald; György Nébald	Hungary

The men's team sabre was one of eight fencing events on the fencing at the 1980 Summer Olympics programme. It was the sixteenth appearance of the event. The competition was held from 28 to 29 July 1980. 63 fencers from 8 nations competed.

== Rosters ==
Bulgaria
- Khristo Etropolski
- Nikolay Marincheshki
- Vasil Etropolski
- Georgi Chomakov
- Marin Ivanov

Cuba
- Manuel Ortiz
- Jesús Ortiz
- José Laverdecia
- Guzman Salazar

East Germany
- Rüdiger Müller
- Hendrik Jung
- Peter Ulbrich
- Frank-Eberhard Höltje
- Gerd May

Hungary
- Imre Gedővári
- Pál Gerevich
- Ferenc Hammang
- Rudolf Nébald
- György Nébald

Italy
- Mario Aldo Montano
- Michele Maffei
- Ferdinando Meglio
- Marco Romano
- Giovanni Scalzo

Poland
- Tadeusz Piguła
- Leszek Jabłonowski
- Jacek Bierkowski
- Andrzej Kostrzewa

Romania
- Ioan Pop
- Marin Mustață
- Cornel Marin
- Ion Pantelimonescu
- Alexandru Nilca

Soviet Union
- Viktor Sidyak
- Vladimir Nazlymov
- Viktor Krovopuskov
- Mikhail Burtsev
- Nikolay Alyokhin

== Results ==
=== Round 1 ===
==== Round 1 Pool A ====
Cuba defeated Romania 9–7, followed by Romania defeating the Soviet Union 9–7. In the final match of the pool, Cuba needed a win to take first place while the Soviet team needed to reach at least 10 bouts won to guarantee first place (a 9–7 Soviet win would result in a three-way tie, broken by touches). The Soviets got to 10–5 to win the pool, with the final bout unnecessary.

Pos	Team	W	L	BW	BL	Qual.	URS	ROU	CUB
1	Soviet Union	1	1	17	14	QS		7–9	10–5
2	Romania	1	1	16	16	QQ	9–7		7–9
3	Cuba	1	1	14	17		5–10	9–7	

Source: Official Report, vol. 3, p. 247

==== Round 1 Pool B ====
Poland defeated East Germany 9–7, followed by East Germany and Bulgaria tying 8–8 (with 63 touches apiece). Poland defeated Bulgaria 9–7 to win the pool. East Germany and Bulgaria were tied on matches, bouts, and touches received, but East Germany had 2 more touches scored than Bulgaria (having scored 60–62 against Poland, to Bulgaria's 58–62).

Pos	Team	W	L	BW	BL	Qual.	POL	GDR	BUL
1	Poland	2	0	18	14	QQ		9–7	9–7
2	East Germany	0.5	1.5	15	17	QQ	7–9		8–8
3	Bulgaria	0.5	1.5	15	17		7–9	8–8	

Source: Official Report, vol. 3, pp. 247–48

==== Round 1 Pool C ====
In the only match of the pool, Italy defeated Hungary 8–7. (The final bout was unnecessary, as Italy's 65–52 touches lead ensured that Italy would win the tie-breaker even if Hungary won the last bout 5–0.)

Pos	Team	W	L	BW	BL	Qual.	ITA	HUN
1	Italy	1	0	8	7	QS		8–7
2	Hungary	0	1	7	8	QQ	7–8	

Source: Official Report, vol. 3, p. 248

=== Elimination rounds ===
Quarterfinals
C2	Hungary	9
B2	East Germany	7
A1	Soviet Union
Bye
A2	Romania	7
B1	Poland	9
C1	Italy
Bye

Semifinals
C2	Hungary	6
A1	Soviet Union	8
B1	Poland	5
C1	Italy	10

Final
A1	Soviet Union	9
C1	Italy	2
Third place
C2	Hungary	9
B1	Poland	6

Fifth Place
B2	East Germany	6
A2	Romania	9
