= Fencing at the Friendship Games =

Fencing at the Friendship Games took place at the Budapest Sportcsarnok in Budapest, Hungary between 15 and 21 July 1984. 8 events (6 men's and 2 women's) were contested.

== Medal summary ==
=== Men's events ===
Event	Gold	Silver	Bronze
Individual foil	Vladimer Aptsiauri (URS)	Guillermo Betancourt (CUB)	Bogusław Zych (POL)
Team foil	Soviet Union (URS); Aleksander Romankov; Vladimer Aptsiauri; Vladimir Lapitsky; Anvar Ibraguimov; Boris Koretsky	Hungary (HUN); Róbert Gátai; Pál Szekeres; Zsolt Érsek; István Szelei	Poland (POL); Bogusław Zych; Waldemar Ciesielczyk; Marian Sypniewski; Adam Robak; Piotr Kiełpikowski
Individual épée	Ernõ Kolczonay (HUN)	Andre Kuehnemund (GDR)	Robert Felisiak (POL)
Team épée	Poland (POL); Robert Felisiak; Leszek Swornowski; Ludomir Chronowski; Mariusz Strzałka; Wojciech Mróz	East Germany (GDR); Uwe Proske; Thomas Bieler; Andreas Gerlach; Uwe Koslowsky; Andre Kuehnemund	Soviet Union (URS); Leonid Dunaev; Aleksander Mozhaev; Mikhail Tishko; Andrus Kajak; Vitaliy Ageyev
Individual sabre	Mikhail Burtsev (URS)	Andrey Alshan (URS)	Vasil Etropolski (BUL)
Team sabre	Soviet Union (URS); Mikhail Burtsev; Viktor Krovopuskov; Andrey Alshan; Heorhiy Pohosov; Sergei Mindirgassov	Hungary (HUN); József Varga; Imre Bujdosó; Imre Gedővári; László Csongrádi; Péter Abay	Poland (POL); Tadeusz Piguła; Jacek Bierkowski; Dariusz Wódke; Janusz Olech; Andrzej Kostrzewa

=== Women's events ===
Event	Gold	Silver	Bronze
Individual foil	Gertrúd Stefanek (HUN)	Beate Götze (GDR)	Edit Kovács (HUN)
Team foil	Hungary (HUN); Gertrúd Stefanek; Edit Kovács; Zsuzsanna Jánosi; Katalin Győrffy	Soviet Union (URS); Valentina Sidorova; Irina Ushakova; Olga Velichko; Olga Voshchakina; Olga Kislyakova	East Germany (GDR); Beate Götze; Elke Gerstenberger; Mandy Niklaus; Gabrielle Janke; Rieper

== Medal table ==
* Host nation (Hungary)

Rank	Nation	Gold	Silver	Bronze	Total
1	Soviet Union (URS)	4	2	1	7
2	Hungary (HUN)*	3	2	1	6
3	Poland (POL)	1	0	4	5
4	East Germany (GDR)	0	3	1	4
5	Cuba (CUB)	0	1	0	1
6	Bulgaria (BUL)	0	0	1	1
Totals (6 entries)		8	8	8	24

== See also ==
- Fencing at the 1984 Summer Olympics
