= Nikolay Alyokhin =

Belarusian Olympic fencer (1954–2023)

Personal information
- Native name: Николай Алёхин
- Full name: Nikolay Aleksandrovich Alyokhin
- Born: 26 October 1954 Minsk, Byelorussian Soviet Socialist Republic
- Died: 8 July 2023

Fencing career
- Sport: Fencing
- Weapon: Sabre
Medal record
Men's fencing
Representing Soviet Union
Olympic Games
Gold medal – first place	1980 Moscow	Sabre, team
World Championships
Gold medal – first place	1979 Melbourne	Sabre, team
Silver medal – second place	1981 Clermont-Ferrand	Sabre, team
Universiade
Gold medal – first place	1979 Mexico City	Sabre, team

Nikolay Aleksandrovich Alyokhin (Russian: Николай Александрович Алёхин; Belarusian: Мікалай Аляксандравіч Алёхін; 26 October 1954 – 8 July 2023) was a Belarusian sabre fencer. He competed at the 1980 Summer Olympics for the Soviet Union, winning the gold medal in the team sabre event.

Born in Minsk, Belarus, Alyokhin took up fencing as a youth and won local competitions. Wanting to become an Olympic and world champion, he trained on a near-daily basis and was eventually accepted into the Minsk Sports Palace, where he trained under the national coach. He won a bronze medal at the Spartakiad of the Peoples of the USSR in 1975 and was selected for the Soviet Union national team in 1978. He was subsequently a member of the Soviet team that won gold at the 1979 World Fencing Championships.

Alyokhin was a member of the Soviet gold medal-winning team at the 1980 Summer Olympics in Moscow and helped the Soviet team to a silver at the 1981 World Fencing Championships. He was ranked second in the world among sabre fencers in 1982 by the Fencing World Cup and later retired. After his career, he worked as a coach for the national team.

== Early life ==
Alyokhin was born on 26 October 1954 in Minsk, Byelorussian Soviet Socialist Republic. He grew up in the military town of Masyukovshchina and was friends with future Olympic champion Alexandr Romankov. Sovetsky Sport described Masyukovshchina as a "small town where the only entertainment was a morning market and one amateur performance club for the whole town". Alyokhin and Romankov decided to try out for the town's fencing club, the only sports club in the town, later explaining that "We came because there was nothing else to do". They initially practiced fencing with the rapier, but their trainer, Ernest Asievsky, later decided to switch them to the sabre.

== Career ==
Alyokhin quickly showed talent in the sabre, winning second place at the Republican Spartakiad for schoolchildren, the first competition he entered. He followed this with a series of victories at other local competitions. As a child, he was asked by national coach Alexander Fel, "What do you want to be?", and Alyokhin declared "World and Olympic champion!" Despite Alyokhin's local success, Fel did not consider him talented enough; according to Sovetsky Sport, Fel "slapped Alyokhin in the forehead" and told him: "You're not talented".

Alyokhin continued to pursue fencing and trained on a near-daily basis at the gym until "the workers turned off the lights" each day. His parents were initially unsupportive of his career. He watched training sessions at the Minsk Sports Palace, where Fel was coach, and eventually impressed Fel enough that Fel took him on as a student. At the Sports Palace, he learned from and watched many fencing champions, including Olympic champion Viktor Sidyak.

Alyokhin became a candidate for the Soviet Union national fencing team in 1974 by being one of the top 24 finishers at the national championship. The following year, he competed at the Spartakiad of the Peoples of the USSR and won the bronze medal in the sabre event. He served in the Soviet Armed Forces and graduated from the Byelorussian State Institute of Physical Culture in 1978. He was selected for the national team for the first time in 1978, and in 1979 was a silver medalist in the team event at the 1979 Summer Spartakiad of the Peoples of the USSR. After his medal at the Spartakiad, he was selected for the 1979 World Fencing Championships in Australia, where he competed in the individual and team events. He missed out on the bronze medal in the individual event by one point. In the team event, he helped the Soviets win the gold medal. He also won a gold medal in the team event at the 1979 Summer Universiade.

In 1980, Alyokhin was selected to represent the Soviet Union in team sabre fencing at the 1980 Summer Olympics in Moscow. Part of a team comprising Viktor Sidyak, Vladimir Nazlymov, Viktor Krovopuskov and Mikhail Burtsev, he participated in the preliminary round, in which the team lost to Romania by a score of 9–7. Afterwards, the team defeated Cuba, Hungary, and Italy in the finals to become the Olympic champions. He was one of two Belarusians on the Soviet gold medal team.

The same year as his Olympic gold medal, Alyokhin won third place at the 1980 Czechoslovakia tournament in the individual event and won gold in the team event at the USSR championships. He competed at the 1981 World Fencing Championships in Clermont-Ferrand, where he was a silver medalist with the Soviet team. He also placed fourth in the individual event at the 1981 championships. In 1982, he won the USSR championship in the team event. That year, he also won the Hungarian Cup, and at the end of the season, he was ranked second in the world in the Fencing World Cup standings. He later retired from fencing. For his career, he received the title of Honored Master of Sports of the USSR and was honored with the Medal "For Distinguished Labour".

== Later life ==
After his career, Alyokhin worked as a coach and was president of the Golden Blade fencing club in Belarus. He also was a coach for the Belarus national team. Outside of sports, he worked as a commercial director for a company in Minsk. In later years, he said his Olympic medal had been stolen, and he lamented the lack of interest in his career, saying that "They remember me only when there are some events where they need to show champions. I have been retired for a long time, but I still have strength, knowledge, and experience, it's a shame that there is no one to pass it on to". He died on 8 July 2023 at the age of 68. Viktor Lukashenko, the president of the Belarus Olympic Committee, described Alyokhin's death as a "bitter loss for domestic fencing".
