= Valentina Sidorova =

Soviet fencer (1954–2021)

Personal information
- Born: Valentina Burochkina; 4 May 1954 Moscow, Russian SFSR, Soviet Union
- Died: 9 June 2021 (aged 67) Moscow, Russia

Sport
- Sport: Fencing
- Coached by: David Dushman
Medal record
Women's fencing
Representing Soviet Union
Olympic Games
Gold medal – first place	1976 Montréal	Team foil
Silver medal – second place	1980 Moscow	Team foil
World Championships
Gold medal – first place	1974 Grenoble	Team foil
Gold medal – first place	1975 Budapest	Team foil
Gold medal – first place	1977 Buenos Aires	Individual foil
Gold medal – first place	1977 Buenos Aires	Team foil
Gold medal – first place	1978 Hamburg	Individual foil
Gold medal – first place	1978 Hamburg	Team foil
Gold medal – first place	1979 Melbourne	Team foil
Gold medal – first place	1981 Clermont-Ferrand	Team foil
Gold medal – first place	1986 Sofia	Team foil
Silver medal – second place	1973 Gothenburg	Team foil
Silver medal – second place	1979 Melbourne	Individual foil
Bronze medal – third place	1985 Barcelona	Team foil
Summer Universiade
Gold medal – first place	1973 Moscow	Individual foil
Gold medal – first place	1977 Sofia	Team foil
Silver medal – second place	1973 Moscow	Team foil
Silver medal – second place	1979 Mexico City	Team foil

Valentina Vasilyevna Sidorova (Russian: Валентина Васильевна Сидорова, née Burochkina; 4 May 1954 – 9 June 2021) was a Soviet fencer. She won a gold medal in the women's team foil event at the 1976 Summer Olympics and a silver in the same event at the 1980 Summer Olympics.
