= Mikhail Burtsev =

Soviet fencer (1956–2015)

Personal information
- Born: 21 June 1956 Moscow, Soviet Union
- Died: 16 October 2015 (aged 59) Moscow, Russia

Sport
- Sport: Fencing
Medal record
Men's fencing
Representing Soviet Union
Olympic Games
Gold medal – first place	1976 Montréal	Team sabre
Gold medal – first place	1980 Moscow	Team sabre
Silver medal – second place	1980 Moscow	Individual sabre
Silver medal – second place	1988 Seoul	Team sabre
World Championships
Gold medal – first place	1977 Buenos Aires	Team sabre
Gold medal – first place	1979 Melbourne	Team sabre
Gold medal – first place	1983 Vienna	Team sabre
Gold medal – first place	1985 Barcelona	Team sabre
Gold medal – first place	1986 Sofia	Team sabre
Gold medal – first place	1987 Lausanne	Team sabre
Silver medal – second place	1978 Hamburg	Team sabre
Silver medal – second place	1978 Hamburg	Individual sabre
Silver medal – second place	1981 Clermont-Ferrand	Team sabre
Bronze medal – third place	1979 Melbourne	Individual sabre
Bronze medal – third place	1982 Rome	Team sabre
Summer Universiade
Gold medal – first place	1979 Mexico City	Team sabre
Silver medal – second place	1979 Mexico City	Individual sabre
Bronze medal – third place	1977 Sofia	Team sabre

Mikhail Ivanovich Burtsev (Russian: Михаил Иванович Бурцев; 21 June 1956 – 16 October 2015) was a Soviet sabre fencer. He won two gold medals and two silvers at three different Olympic Games.

== Career ==
Burtsev began his fencing career in 1965; he originally fenced for Burevstnik, and later for CSKA Moscow. Burtsev was a graduate of the Russian State University of Physical Education, Sport, Youth and Tourism. He was named a Merited Master of Sport of the USSR (Заслуженный мастер спорта) in 1980.

Burtsev was one of the youngest Olympic fencing champions, being only 20 years old when he won his first gold medal in Canada in 1976. Burtsev was unable to compete at the 1984 Summer Olympics because of the Soviet boycott of those games, but went on to win the silver medal in men's team sabre in the 1988 Summer Olympics. At the 1992 Summer Olympics, he coached the Unified Team fielded by the former Soviet Union, which took the gold medal at men's team sabre.

== Honours ==
=== Individual ===
- Silver medal at the World Championships (1978)
- Bronze medal at the World Championships (1979)
- Silver medal at the Olympic Games (1980)
- Gold medal at the Friendship Games (1984)
- Merited Master of Sport of the USSR (1980)

=== Team ===
- Six-time world champion (1977, 1979, 1983, 1985, 1986, 1987)
- Silver medal at the World Championships (1978, 1981)
- Bronze medal at the World Championships (1982)
- Gold medal at the Olympic Games (1976, 1980)
- Silver medal at the Olympic Games (1988)
- Gold medal at the Friendship Games (1984)
