= Rudolf Nébald =

Hungarian fencer (born 1952)

Personal information
- Born: 7 September 1952 (age 74) Budapest, Hungary

Sport
- Sport: Fencing
Medal record
Men's fencing
Representing Hungary
Olympic Games
| Bronze medal – third place | 1980 Moscow | Team sabre |
World Championships
| Gold medal – first place | 1981 Clermont-Ferrand | Team sabre |
Summer Universiade
| Silver medal – second place | 1979 Mexico City | Team sabre |

Rudolf Nébald (born 7 September 1952) is a Hungarian fencer who won a bronze medal in the team sabre competition at the 1980 Summer Olympics in Moscow together with György Nébald, Ferenc Hammang, Imre Gedővári and Pál Gerevich.
