= Elena Belova (fencer) =

Soviet fencer and professor

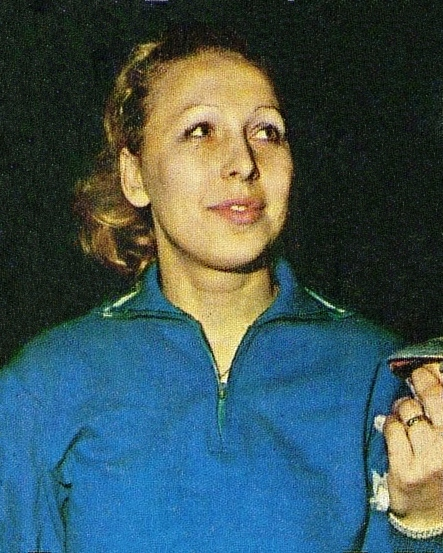
- Elena Belova c. 1974

Personal information
- Full name: Elena Dmitriyevna Novikova-Belova (née Novikova)
- Born: 28 July 1947 (age 79) Sovetskaya Gavan, Khabarovsk Kray, Russian SFSR, Soviet Union
- Height: 1.76 m (5 ft 9 in)
- Weight: 69 kg (152 lb)

Sport
- Sport: Fencing
- Club: Dynamo Minsk; Army Club Minsk
Medal record
Representing Soviet Union
Olympic Games
Gold medal – first place	1968 Mexico City	Individual foil
Gold medal – first place	1968 Mexico City	Team foil
Gold medal – first place	1972 Munich	Team foil
Gold medal – first place	1976 Montreal	Team foil
Bronze medal – third place	1976 Montreal	Individual foil
Silver medal – second place	1980 Moscow	Team foil
	Pierre de Coubertin medal	2007
World Championships
Gold medal – first place	1969 Havana	Individual foil
Gold medal – first place	1970 Ankara	Team foil
Gold medal – first place	1971 Vienna	Team foil
Gold medal – first place	1974 Grenoble	Team foil
Gold medal – first place	1975 Budapest	Team foil
Gold medal – first place	1977 Buenos Aires	Team foil
Gold medal – first place	1978 Hamburg	Team foil
Gold medal – first place	1979 Melbourne	Team foil
Silver medal – second place	1969 Havana	Team foil
Silver medal – second place	1970 Ankara	Individual foil
Silver medal – second place	1973 Gothenburg	Team foil
Silver medal – second place	1977 Buenos Aires	Individual foil
Summer Universiade
Gold medal – first place	1970 Turin	Team foil
Silver medal – second place	1973 Moscow	Team foil
Bronze medal – third place	1973 Moscow	Individual foil

Elena Dmitriyevna Novikova-Belova (Russian: Елена Дмитриевна Новикова-Белова, née Novikova, born 28 July 1947) is a retired Russian foil fencer, known professionally simply as Elena Belova. She competed at the 1968, 1972, 1976 and 1980 Olympics in the individual and team events and won four gold, one silver and one bronze medal, becoming the first female fencer to win four Olympic gold medals. She nearly won a fifth gold in 1976, but lost her last pool match to the last-placed fencer. Belova also won eight world titles, individually in 1969, and with the Soviet team in 1970–1979.

Shortly before the 1968 Olympics, she married Vyacheslav Belov, a future world champion in modern pentathlon, and hyphenated her last name from Novikova to Novikova-Belova. She retired after the 1980 Olympics, and gave birth in 1987, aged 40. After divorcing Belov, she married her second husband, composer Valery Ivanov, who devoted a waltz to her, while keeping the surname Novikova-Belova.

In 1970, Belova graduated from the Minsk Institute of Pedagogy, she holds a PhD in this discipline. In 1997 she was awarded the Olympic Order in Silver, and in 2007 the Pierre de Coubertin Medal. On 14 May 2021, Jovian asteroid 24426 Belova, discovered by astronomers with the LINEAR program in 2000, was named in her honor.
