= Imre Gedővári =

Hungarian fencer (1951–2014)

Personal information
- Nationality: Hungarian
- Born: 1 July 1951 Budapest, Hungarian People's Republic
- Died: 22 May 2014 (aged 62)
- Height: 1.90 m (6 ft 3 in)
- Weight: 87 kg (192 lb)

Sport
- Country: Hungary
- Sport: Fencing
- Event: Sabre
- Club: Újpesti TE (1964–1986); Vasas SC (1986–1988)
- Coached by: Csaba Zarándi
Medal record
Representing Hungary
Olympic Games
Gold medal – first place	1988 Seoul	Team sabre
Bronze medal – third place	1980 Moscow	Individual sabre
Bronze medal – third place	1980 Moscow	Team sabre
World Championships
Gold medal – first place	1978 Hamburg	Team sabre
Gold medal – first place	1981 Clermont-Ferrand	Team sabre
Gold medal – first place	1982 Rome	Team sabre
Silver medal – second place	1975 Budapest	Team sabre
Silver medal – second place	1977 Buenos Aires	Team sabre
Silver medal – second place	1981 Clermont-Ferrand	Individual sabre
Bronze medal – third place	1982 Rome	Individual sabre
Bronze medal – third place	1983 Vienna	Team sabre
Bronze medal – third place	1985 Barcelona	Team sabre
European Championships
Gold medal – first place	1981 Foggi	Individual sabre
Summer Universiade
Gold medal – first place	1979 Mexico City	Individual sabre
Silver medal – second place	1973 Moscow	Team sabre
Silver medal – second place	1977 Sofia	Team sabre
Silver medal – second place	1979 Mexico City	Team sabre

Imre Gedővári (1 July 1951 – 22 May 2014) was a Hungarian fencer and Olympic gold medalist. He won his first World Championship medal, a silver, in 1975 and made his Olympic debut in 1976. He won his first World Championship gold medals in 1978 for team sabre, adding two more in 1981 and 1982. At the 1980 Olympics, he won two bronze medals. At the 1988 Olympics, Gedővári won the decisive match in a come-from-behind gold medal performance for Hungary. He retired from competition after the Olympics as a ten-time national champion. He remained active in sport, working for the Hungarian Fencing Federation and Újpesti TE.

Gedővári was awarded an Order of the Star by Hungary in 1988, and was twice named national fencer of the year. He fenced left-handed and had a tall, slender build.

== Career ==
In 1964, Gedővári joined Újpesti Dózsa. He made his senior debut with the national team in 1974 and won a silver medal at the World Championship in team sabre the following year.

Gedővári made his first Olympics in 1976. In the individual sabre competition, he advanced to the semi-finals where he was eliminated in a tie for seventh place. He accumulated a 17–6 record in the team sabre, but Hungary lost the bronze medal match to Romania, leaving Gedővári without a medal. The following year, he won a bronze in team sabre at the World Championships. In 1978, he won his first World Championship gold medal in the team sabre. He was also selected as national fencer of year.

At the 1980 Summer Olympics, Gedővári advanced past the opening round of the individual sabre with a 4–0 record. He then went 4–1 in the next round and made the finals. He went 3–2 in the finals, winning the bronze medal. In the team competition, he went 11–5 and won a second bronze medal. Hungary followed up the Olympic bronze with back-to-back World Championship wins, netting Gedővári two gold medals. He captured the European Championship in individual sabre in 1981, and the silver in the World Championships that year. In 1982, he won the individual bronze at Worlds.

In 1983, Hungary placed third at the World Championships, earning Gedővári another bronze medal. He was selected as national fencer of the year in 1984, but was unable to represent his country in the Olympics due to Hungary boycotting the Games. He added another bronze medal to his collection in team sabre at the 1985 World Championships.

Perhaps the highlight of Gedővári's career came at the 1988 Summer Olympics. In the team sabre gold medal match, the Soviet Union took an 8–4 lead with four matches to go. Gedővári's teammates won three straight to make it 8–7 with just Gedővári's final match remaining. He fell behind 4–1 early, but fought back to win the bout 5–4. The win gave Hungary the gold medal on points. Gedővári placed 15th in the individual competition that year.

Gedővári retired after the Olympics, later remarking he could have continued physically but was "bored" with competition. Between 1976 and his retirement, he won 10 national titles in sabre. Gedővári was awarded an Order of the Star of the Republic of Hungary, a State Order, in 1988. In 1992, he won the Ferenc Kemény award which is given annual by the Ministry of National Resources in recognition of outstanding teaching and scholarly activity in the sports. In 2000, Vasas SC selected him into their honorary "Goldring".

== Later life ==
After retiring, Gedővári went to Donát Bánki College to get a law degree. He served as the Hungarian Fencing Federation General Secretary from 1989 to 1991, and as president of Újpesti TE from 1991 to 1996. He also spent time teaching fencing to young people and entering cooking contests.

Gedővári died on 22 May 2014, following a prolonged undisclosed illness. He was 62. Teammate and individual Olympic champion Bence Szabó called Gedővári his role model as an athlete and as a person. "It is difficult to accept that we have lost such a valuable person," he said.
