= 1982 European Fencing Championships =

Fencing tournament

The 1982 European Fencing Championships were held in Mödling, Austria. The competition consisted of individual events only.

== Medal summary ==
=== Men's events ===
Event	Gold	Silver	Bronze
Foil	Mauro Numa (ITA)	Mathias Gey (FRG)	Andrea Borella (ITA)
Épée	Olivier Carrard (SUI)	Ernő Kolczonay (HUN)	Robert Felisiak (POL)
Sabre	Tadeusz Piguła (POL)	Andrzej Kostrzewa (POL)	György Nébald (HUN)

=== Women's events ===
Event	Gold	Silver	Bronze
Foil	Dorina Vaccaroni (ITA)	Gertrúd Stefanek (HUN)	Carola Cicconetti (ITA)

=== Medal table ===
Rank	Nation	Gold	Silver	Bronze	Total
1	Italy (ITA)	2	0	2	4
2	Poland (POL)	1	1	1	3
3	Switzerland (SUI)	1	0	0	1
4	Hungary (HUN)	0	2	1	3
5	West Germany (FRG)	0	1	0	1
Totals (5 entries)		4	4	4	12
