= Angelo Mazzoni =

Italian fencer (born 1961)

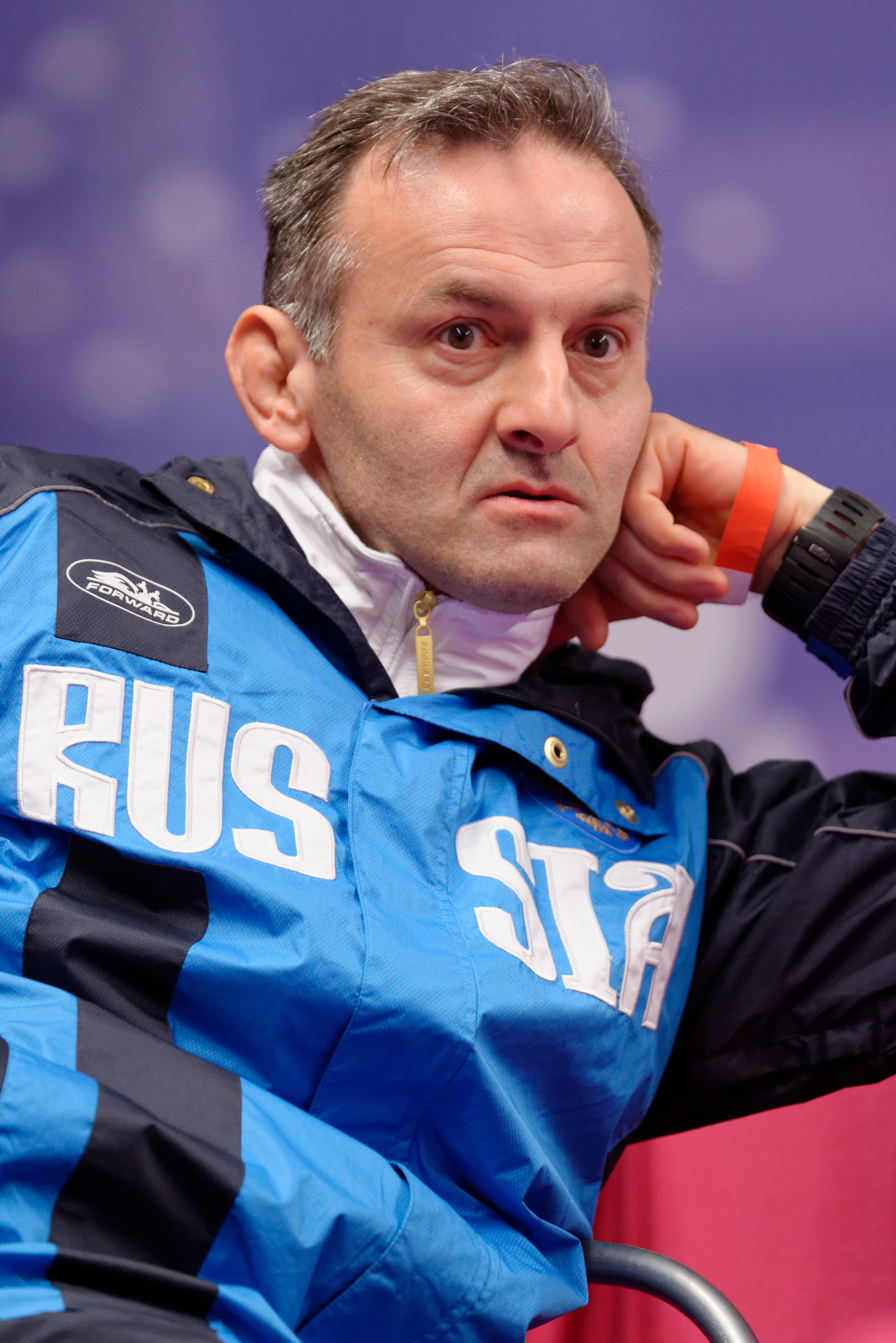

Personal information
- Born: 3 April 1961 (age 65) Milan, Italy
- Height: 1.83 m (6 ft 0 in)
- Weight: 77 kg (170 lb)

Fencing career
- Sport: Fencing
- Weapon: Épée
- Hand: Right-handed
- Club: CS Carabinieri
Medal record
Men's épée fencing
Representing Italy
Olympic Games
Gold medal – first place	1996 Atlanta	Team épée
Gold medal – first place	2000 Sydney	Team épée
Bronze medal – third place	1984 Los Angeles	Team épée
World Championships
Gold medal – first place	1989 Denver	Team épée
Gold medal – first place	1990 Lyon	Team épée
Gold medal – first place	1993 Essen	Team épée
Silver medal – second place	1985 Barcelona	Team épée
Silver medal – second place	1990 Lyon	Individual épée
Bronze medal – third place	1983 Vienna	Individual épée
Bronze medal – third place	1983 Vienna	Team épée
Bronze medal – third place	1986 Sofia	Team épée
Bronze medal – third place	1997 Cape Town	Team épée
European Championships
Gold medal – first place	1981 Foggia	Individual épée
Silver medal – second place	1983 Madeira	Individual épée
Mediterranean Games
Silver medal – second place	1983 Casablanca	Individual épée
Bronze medal – third place	1991 Athens	Individual épée

Angelo Mazzoni (born 3 April 1961, in Milan) is an Italian épée fencer who competed at six consecutive Olympics between 1980 and 2000, winning gold medals in 1996 and 2000.

== Career ==
=== Fencing career ===
Mazzoni was the eighth fencer, and the first Italian fencer, to compete at six Olympics. He was the third Italian, after Piero and Raimondo D'Inzeo, to compete at six Olympics.

At the World Championships, Mazzoni placed third in 1983 and second in 1990. At the European Championships, he came in first in 1981 and third in 1983.

Mazzoni competed in the Individual épée event at the Mediterranean Games where he won a gold medal in 1983 and a bronze medal in 1991.

He was coached by Italian coach Gianni Muzio.

=== Coaching career ===
In February 2008, Mazzoni and Muzio were hired by the Fencing Federation of Switzerland to be in charge of coaching the Switzerland men's and women's teams for the 2012 London Olympics. In April 2014, Mazzoni decided to leave Switzerland, and expressed a desire to return to Italy mainly for family reasons.

After the 2014 World Fencing Championships, the Russian Fencing Federation announced Mazzoni as the new coach of the Russian senior men's épée team.

Since 2022 he has been coaching the Israeli fencing team, including épée fencer, Yuval Freilich.

== See also ==
- List of athletes with the most appearances at Olympic Games
