= Viktor Sidyak =

Soviet fencer

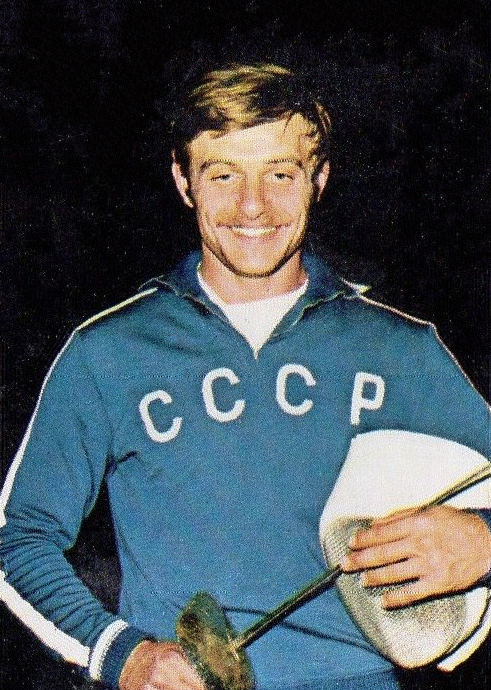

Personal information
- Born: 24 November 1943 (age 82) Anzhero-Sudzhensk, Kemerovo Oblast, Russian SFSR, Soviet Union
- Height: 1.76 m (5 ft 9 in)
- Weight: 76 kg (168 lb)

Sport
- Sport: Fencing
- Club: SKA Lviv, SKA Minsk
Medal record
Men's fencing
Representing Soviet Union
Olympic Games
Gold medal – first place	1968 Mexico City	Team sabre
Gold medal – first place	1972 Munich	Individual sabre
Gold medal – first place	1976 Montreal	Team sabre
Gold medal – first place	1980 Moscow	Team sabre
Silver medal – second place	1972 Munich	Team sabre
Bronze medal – third place	1976 Montreal	Individual sabre
World Championships
Gold medal – first place	1969 Havana	Individual sabre
Gold medal – first place	1969 Havana	Team sabre
Gold medal – first place	1970 Ankara	Team sabre
Gold medal – first place	1971 Vienna	Team sabre
Gold medal – first place	1974 Grenoble	Team sabre
Gold medal – first place	1975 Budapest	Team sabre
Gold medal – first place	1979 Melbourne	Team sabre
Silver medal – second place	1973 Gothenburg	Individual sabre
Silver medal – second place	1973 Gothenburg	Team sabre
Bronze medal – third place	1971 Vienna	Individual sabre
Bronze medal – third place	1974 Grenoble	Individual sabre
Summer Universiade
Gold medal – first place	1970 Turin	Individual sabre
Gold medal – first place	1970 Turin	Team sabre

Viktor Aleksandrovich Sidyak (Russian: Ви́ктор Алекса́ндрович Сидя́к; born 24 November 1943) is a Russian former left-handed sabre fencer, a pupil of Mark Rakita and David Tyshler. He was known for his aggressive style and the "one-and-a-half tempo attack".

== Biography ==
Sidyak was born in Anzhero-Sudzhensk in Kemerovo Oblast, but spent most of his childhood in Donetsk. He started fencing at age fifteen. In the 1960s, while training in Lviv, he represented Ukraine on the internal Soviet circuit. He was part of the winning team at the 1968 Summer Olympics in Mexico City. In 1970, he moved to Minsk and joined the Belarusian fencing lobby which had produced Elena Belova, Alexandr Romankov, and Nikolai Alyokhin.

At the 1972 Summer Olympics in Munich, Sidyak became the first Soviet sabreur to win individual gold. At the same Olympics, he fenced in the team final with his right eye bandaged over after having a fragment of the Italian Michele Maffei's blade removed from his eye the previous day. Besides Sidyak, the team consisted of Vladimir Nazlymov, Eduard Vinokurov, and Viktor Bazhenov. The Soviet and Italian teams met again in the finals, Italy taking gold, and USSR silver.

At the world championships Sidyak's won an individual title in 1969 and team titles in 1969–1971, 1974, 1975 and 1979.

In 1994, Maffei's 1972 teammate Mario Aldo Montano invited Sidyak to coach the young fencers at his club in Livorno, including his own son Aldo Montano. Aldo went on to win five olympic medals. Right before the 2008 Summer Olympics Aldo called him again as his trainer.

As of 2016, Sidyak was the chairman of the professional boxing association of Belarus.
