= List of Summer Olympics venues: C =

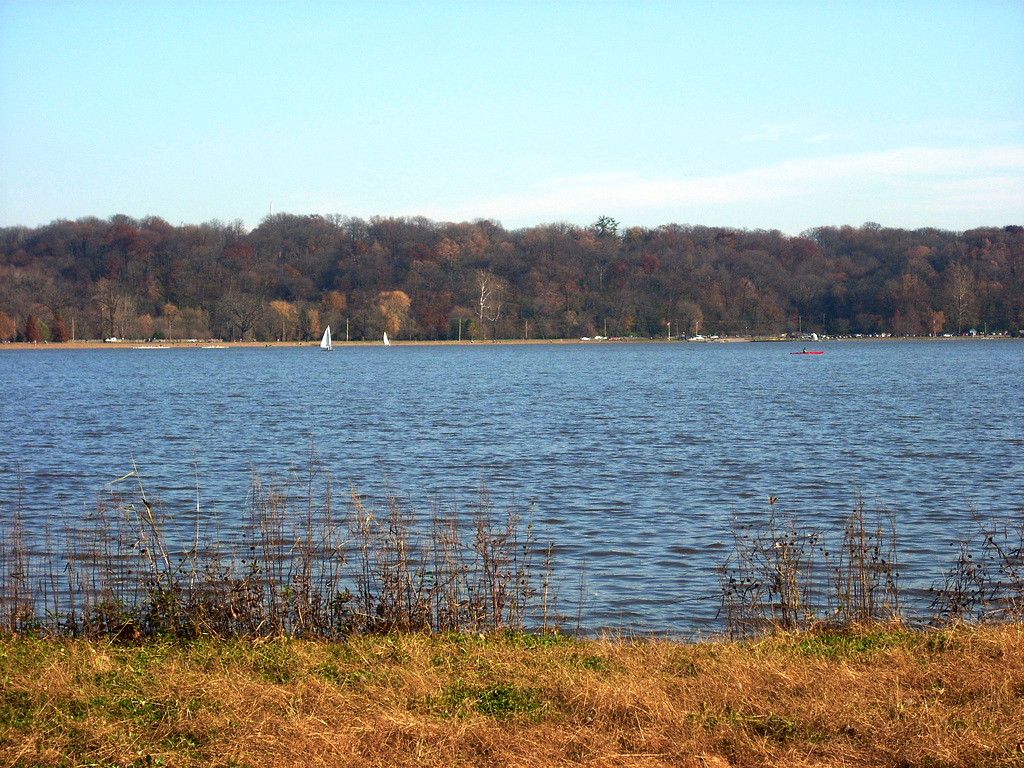
Creve Coeur Lake hosted the rowing events for the 1904 Summer Olympics in St. Louis.

For the Summer Olympics, there are a total of 34 venues that start with the letter 'C'.

| Venue | Games | Sports | Capacity | Ref. |
|---|---|---|---|---|
| Camp de Châlons | 1924 Paris | Shooting (600 m free rifle individual and team) | 395. | |
| Camp Municipal de Beisbol de Viladecans | 1992 Barcelona | Baseball | 4,000 | |
| Campo Marte | 1968 Mexico City | Equestrian (dressage, jumping individual) | 7,885 (jumping); 4,990 (dressage) | |
| Campo Militar 1 | 1968 Mexico City | Modern pentathlon (riding, running) | Not listed. | |
| Campo Tre Fontane | 1960 Rome | Field hockey | 5,000 | |
| Canal Olímpic de Catalunya | 1992 Barcelona | Canoeing (sprint) | 500 | |
| Capital Indoor Stadium | 2008 Beijing | Volleyball (final) | 18,000 | |
| Centennial Parklands | 2000 Sydney | Cycling (road) | Not listed. | |
| Centre Étienne Desmarteau | 1976 Montreal | Basketball | 2,200 | |
| Centre Pierre Charbonneau | 1976 Montreal | Wrestling | 2,700 | |
| Cesano Infantry School Range | 1960 Rome | Shooting (300 m free rifle) | Not listed. | |
| Champion Hill | 1948 London | Football | 3,000 | |
| Chaoyang Park Beach Volleyball Ground | 2008 Beijing | Volleyball (beach) | 12,000 | |
| China Agricultural University Gymnasium | 2008 Beijing | Wrestling | 8,000 | |
| Chofu City | 1964 Tokyo | Athletics (marathon, 50 km walk) | Not listed. | |
| Circuit de Catalunya | 1992 Barcelona | Cycling (road team time trial) | 2,000 | |
| Ricoh Arena (renamed City of Coventry Stadium during the games) | 2012 London | Football | 32,500 | |
| Clark Atlanta University Stadium | 1996 Atlanta | Field hockey | 5,000 | |
| Club de Yates | 1968 Mexico City | Sailing | Not listed. | |
| Club Hípic El Montayá | 1992 Barcelona | Equestrian (dressage, eventing endurance) | 3,400 | |
| Compiègne | 1900 Paris | Golf | Not listed. | |
| Complexe sportif Claude-Robillard | 1976 Montreal | Handball, Water polo | 2,755 (Water polo); 4,721 (Handball) | |
| Copacabana Arena | 2016 Rio de Janeiro | Volleyball (beach) | 12,000 | |
| Copper Box | 2012 London | Fencing, Handball, Modern pentathlon (fencing) | 7,000 | |
| Coto de Caza | 1984 Los Angeles | Modern pentathlon (fencing, riding, running, shooting) | 8,000 | |
| Craven Cottage | 1948 London | Football | 25,700 | |
| Creve Coeur Lake | 1904 St. Louis | Rowing | Not listed. | |
| Cricklefield Stadium | 1948 London | Football | 3,500 | |
| Croix-Catelan Stadium | 1900 Paris | Athletics | Not listed. | |
| Cross-country course | 1992 Barcelona | Modern pentathlon (running) | Not listed. | |
| CSKA Athletics Fieldhouse | 1980 Moscow | Wrestling | 8,500 | |
| CSKA Football Fieldhouse | 1980 Moscow | Fencing, Modern pentathlon (fencing) | 8,500 | |
| CSKA Palace of Sports | 1980 Moscow | Basketball | 5,500 | |
| Cycling road course | 1996 Atlanta | Cycling (road) | 800 | |
