= Ferenc Hammang =

Hungarian fencer (born 1944)

Personal information
- Born: 20 May 1944 (age 82) Budapest, Hungary

Sport
- Sport: Fencing
Medal record
Men's fencing
Representing Hungary
Olympic Games
Bronze medal – third place	1980 Moscow	Sabre Team

Ferenc Hammang (born 20 May 1944) is a Hungarian fencer, who won a bronze medal in the team sabre competition at the 1980 Summer Olympics in Moscow together with György Nébald, Rudolf Nébald, Imre Gedővári and Pál Gerevich.

Is currently the trainer of FKV (Fechtklub Villach).
