= Boris Lukomsky =

Soviet fencer (born 1951)

Personal information
- Born: 6 June 1951 (age 75) Saratov, Russian SFSR, Soviet Union

Sport
- Sport: Fencing
- Club: Metro Chicago Fencing Center
- Team: Soviet National Team
- Now coaching: Metro Chicago Fencing Center

Achievements and titles
- World finals: 3 Titles
Medal record
Men's fencing
Representing Soviet Union
Olympic Games
Bronze medal – third place	1980 Moscow	Team épée
World Championships
Gold medal – first place	1979 Melbourne	Team épée
Silver medal – second place	1975 Budapest	Individual épée
Silver medal – second place	1978 Hamburg	Team épée
Bronze medal – third place	1973 Gothenburg	Team épée
Bronze medal – third place	1974 Grenoble	Individual épée
Bronze medal – third place	1977 Buenos Aires	Team épée
Summer Universiade
Gold medal – first place	1973 Moscow	Team épée
Silver medal – second place	1977 Sofia	Individual épée
Bronze medal – third place	1973 Moscow	Individual épée
Bronze medal – third place	1977 Sofia	Team épée

Boris Lukomsky (Russian: Борис Семёнович Лукомский; born 6 June 1951) is a Soviet fencer. He won a bronze medal in the team épée event at the 1980 Summer Olympics.
