= Mauro Numa =

Italian fencer (born 1961)

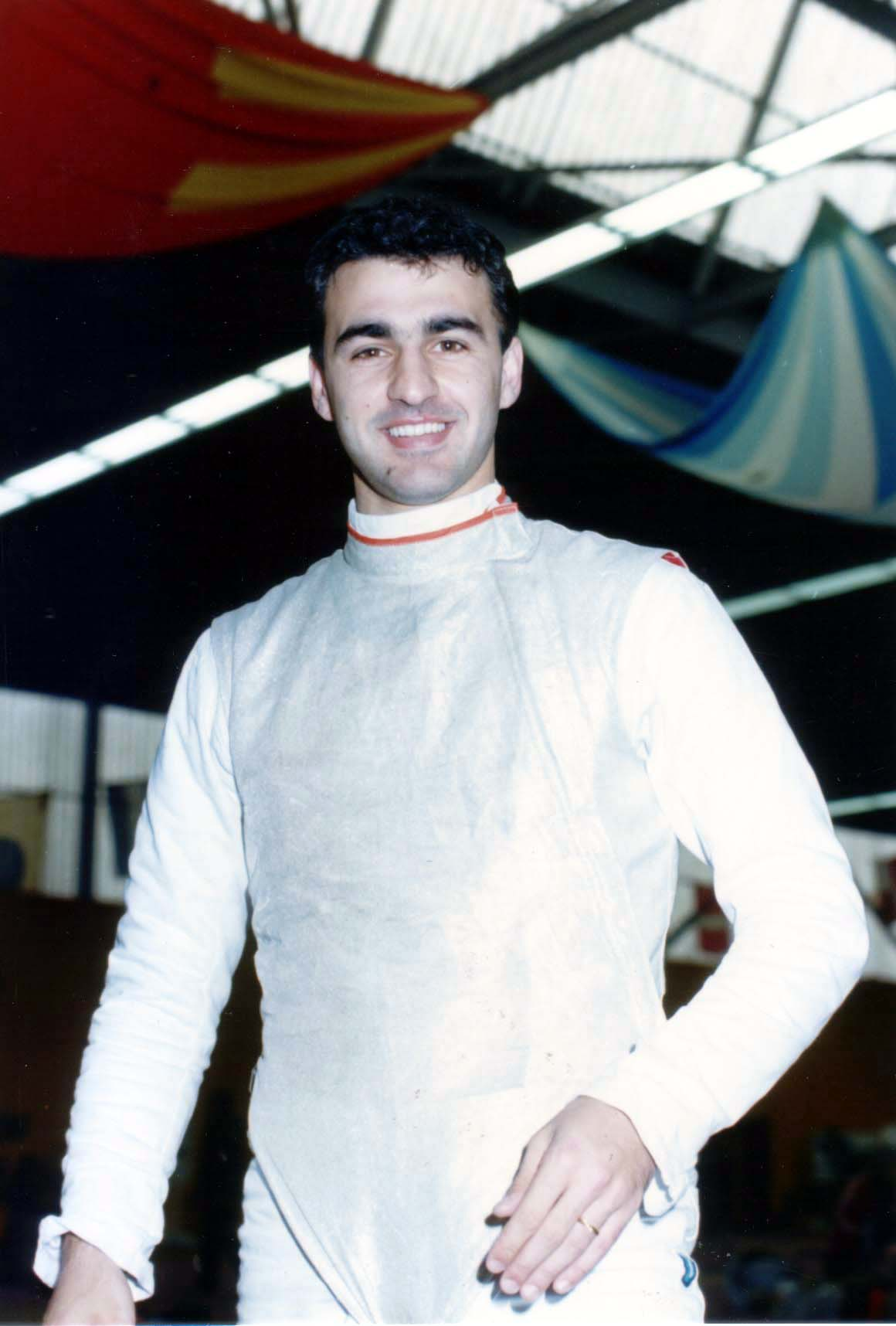

Personal information
- Born: 18 November 1961 (age 64) Mestre, Italy

Sport
- Country: Italy
- Sport: Fencing
- Event: Foil
Medal record
Olympic Games
Gold medal – first place	1984 Los Angeles	Individual foil
Gold medal – first place	1984 Los Angeles	Team foil
World Championships
Gold medal – first place	1985 Barcelona	Individual foil
Gold medal – first place	1985 Barcelona	Team foil
Gold medal – first place	1986 Sofia	Team foil
Silver medal – second place	1979 Melbourne	Team foil
Silver medal – second place	1981 Clermont-Ferrand	Team foil
Silver medal – second place	1982 Rome	Individual foil
Bronze medal – third place	1982 Rome	Team foil
Bronze medal – third place	1986 Sofia	Individual foil
Bronze medal – third place	1989 Denver	Individual foil
European Championships
Gold medal – first place	1982 Mödling	Individual foil
Mediterranean Games
Gold medal – first place	1991 Athens	Individual foil
Bronze medal – third place	1983 Casablanca	Individual foil
Summer Universiade
Gold medal – first place	1981 Bucharest	Team foil
Gold medal – first place	1983 Edmonton	Team foil
Gold medal – first place	1989 Duisburg	Individual foil
Silver medal – second place	1983 Edmonton	Individual foil
Bronze medal – third place	1985 Kobe	Team foil
Bronze medal – third place	1989 Duisburg	Team foil

Mauro Numa (born 8 November 1961 in Mestre) is an Italian fencer and one of the strongest during the 1980s.His career started very early and in 1979, at 18, he was included in the Foil's Italian Team. In 1980 Numa could not compete at the Moscow Olympic Games due to the boycott.

== Biography ==
In 1984 at 22 he competed at the 1984 Summer Olympics winning gold in the individual and team foil events. In the final for the Individual Title Numa won over Matthias Behr. Less than 1 minute before the end Behr was 4 points up but Numa caught his opponent and eventually won in the tie break with the final score of 12-11.

He competed in the individual foil event at the Mediterranean Games in 1983 where he won a bronze medal and in 1991 where he won a gold medal.

In the following years Numa confirmed to be one of the strongest in Foil Individual winning medals in Clermont-Ferrand 1982, in Barcelona 1985, in Sofia 1986, in Denver 1989 World Championships.

== Achievements ==
Year	Competition	Venue	Position	Event
1979	World Championships	(Australia) Melbourne	2nd	Foil team
1981	World Championships	(France) Clermont-Ferrand	2nd	Foil team
1982	World Championships	(Italy) Rome	2nd	Foil individual
1982	World Championships	(Italy) Rome	3rd	Foil Team
1982	European Championships	(Austria) Mödling	1st	Foil individual
1983	Mediterranean Games	(Morocco) Casablanca	3rd	Foil individual
1984	Olympic Games	(United States) Los Angeles	1st	Foil individual
1984	Olympic Games	(United States) Los Angeles	1st	Foil Team
1985	World Championships	(Spain) Barcelona	1st	Foil individual
1985	World Championships	(Spain) Barcelona	1st	Foil Team
1986	World Championships	(Bulgaria) Sofia	3rd	Foil individual
1986	World Championships	(Bulgaria) Sofia	1st	Foil Team
1989	World Championships	(United States) Denver	3rd	Foil individual
1990	World Championships	(France) Lyon	1st	Foil team
1991	Mediterranean Games	(Greece) Athens	1st	Foil individual

Fencing World Cup

- Foil (1982, 1983, 1985)
