= István Osztrics =

Hungarian fencer (born 1949)

Personal information
- Born: 25 December 1949 (age 76) Budapest, Hungary

Sport
- Sport: Fencing
Medal record
Men's fencing
Representing Hungary
Olympic Games
Gold medal – first place	1972 Munich	Team épée
World Championships
Gold medal – first place	1978 Hamburg	Team épée
Silver medal – second place	1973 Gothenburg	Team épée
Bronze medal – third place	1974 Grenoble	Team épée
Bronze medal – third place	1975 Budapest	Individual épée
Bronze medal – third place	1975 Budapest	Team épée
Summer Universiade
Gold medal – first place	1973 Moscow	Individual épée
Silver medal – second place	1970 Turin	Team épée
Silver medal – second place	1973 Moscow	Team épée
Bronze medal – third place	1970 Turin	Individual épée

István Osztrics (born 25 December 1949) is a Hungarian fencer. He won a gold medal in the team épée event at the 1972 Summer Olympics.
