= György Nébald =

Hungarian fencer (born 1956)

Personal information
- Born: 9 March 1956 (age 70) Budapest, Hungary

Fencing career
- Sport: Fencing
- Weapon: Sabre
- Club: Bp. Honvéd (1970-1993)
- Head coach: Tibor Pézsa
Medal record
Men's fencing
Representing Hungary
Olympic Games
Gold medal – first place	1988 Seoul	Team sabre
Silver medal – second place	1992 Barcelona	Team sabre
Bronze medal – third place	1980 Moscow	Team sabre
World Championships
Gold medal – first place	1978 Hamburg	Team sabre
Gold medal – first place	1981 Clermont-Ferrand	Team sabre
Gold medal – first place	1982 Rome	Team sabre
Gold medal – first place	1985 Barcelona	Individual sabre
Gold medal – first place	1990 Lyon	Individual sabre
Gold medal – first place	1991 Budapest	Team sabre
Silver medal – second place	1983 Vienna	Team sabre
Silver medal – second place	1987 Lausanne	Individual sabre
Silver medal – second place	1990 Lyon	Team sabre
Bronze medal – third place	1985 Barcelona	Team sabre
Bronze medal – third place	1991 Budapest	Individual sabre
Summer Universiade
Silver medal – second place	1977 Sofia	Team sabre
Silver medal – second place	1979 Mexico City	Team sabre

György Nébald (born 9 March 1956) is a Hungarian sabre fencer, who has won three Olympic medals in the team sabre competition.

== Awards ==
- Hungarian fencer of the Year (4): 1985, 1987, 1988, 1990
- Order of Merit of the Hungarian People's Republic – Order of Stars (1988)
- Cross of Merit of the Republic of the Hungary – Golden Cross (1992)
- Kemény Ferenc award (1993)
- Fencer Head Coach of the Year - Hungary (2010)
