= Jesús Ortiz =

Jesús Ortiz may refer to:

- Jesús Ortiz (fencer), Cuban fencer
- Jesús Ortiz (football manager), Venezuelan football manager
- Jesús Manuel Ortiz, Puerto Rican politician
- Jessie Ortiz (Jesús Ortiz), American soccer player
