= Ernő Kolczonay =

Hungarian fencer (1953–2009)

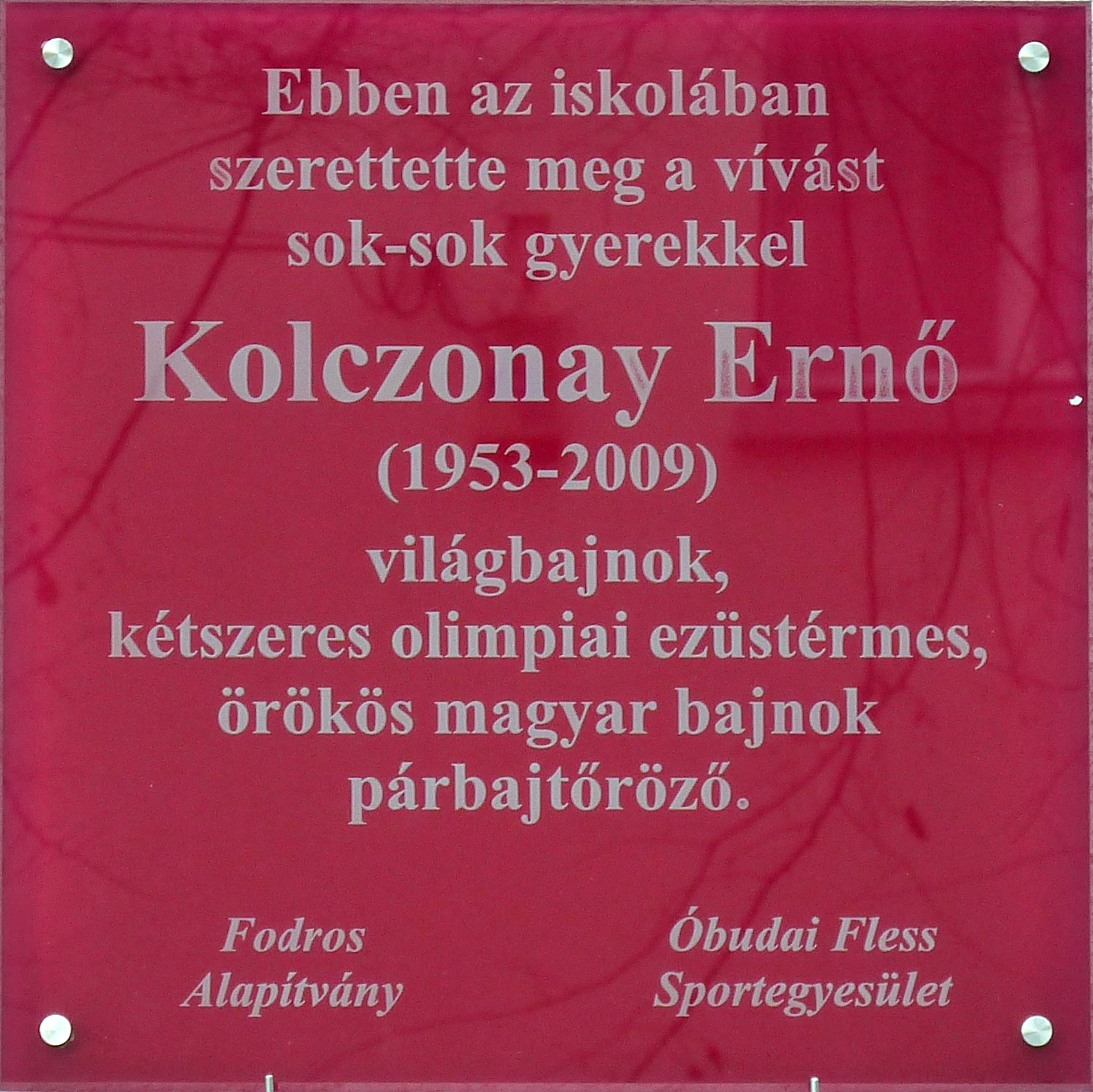

Personal information
- Born: 15 May 1953 Budapest, Hungary
- Died: 3 October 2009 (aged 56) Budapest, Hungary

Sport
- Sport: Fencing
Medal record
Men's fencing
Representing Hungary
Olympic Games
| Silver medal – second place | 1980 Moscow | Individual épée |
| Silver medal – second place | 1992 Barcelona | Team épée |
World Championships
| Gold medal – first place | 1978 Hamburg | Team épée |
| Silver medal – second place | 1979 Melbourne | Individual épée |
| Bronze medal – third place | 1974 Grenoble | Team épée |
| Bronze medal – third place | 1981 Clermont-Ferrand | Team épée |
| Bronze medal – third place | 1982 Rome | Individual épée |
| Bronze medal – third place | 1982 Rome | Team épée |
Summer Universiade
| Gold medal – first place | 1979 Mexico City | Individual épée |
| Gold medal – first place | 1979 Mexico City | Team épée |
| Bronze medal – third place | 1981 Bucharest | Individual épée |

Ernő Kolczonay (15 May 1953 – 3 October 2009) was a Hungarian épée fencer, who won two Olympic silver medals in the Épée competitions. He was a member of the Hungarian fencing team that won the world championship in Hamburg, 1978. He was runner-up in the 1979 world championship (Melbourne) and the 1982 European Championship (Mödling).

He was the fencer of the Hungarian club Budapesti Honved where he reached his most outstanding results. Later, he became a coach and he also worked for the Greece national team for several years.

At the start of the 1990s, he founded his own club named Fless Vívósikola és Sportklub. He became a successful coach and he dedicated his life to train, especially children and young people. While he remained active competitor as well, the young fencers of Fless became successful.

In his later years, Kolczonay suffered from liver disease, and died on October 3, 2009.
