= Ildikó Schwarczenberger =

Hungarian fencer (1951–2015)

Personal information
- Born: 9 September 1951 Budapest, Hungary
- Died: 13 July 2015 (aged 63) Budapest, Hungary
- Height: 1.61 m (5 ft 3 in)
- Weight: 60 kg (132 lb)

Fencing career
- Sport: Fencing
- Weapon: foil
- Hand: left-handed
- Club: Vörös Meteor, Budapest; MTK, Budapest
- Head coach: Bertalan Szőcs
Medal record
Women's foil
Representing Hungary
Olympic Games
Silver medal – second place	1972 Munich	Team foil
Gold medal – first place	1976 Montreal	Individual foil
Bronze medal – third place	1976 Montreal	Team foil
Bronze medal – third place	1980 Moscow	Team foil
World Championships
Gold medal – first place	1973 Gothenburg	Team foil
Silver medal – second place	1971 Vienna	Team foil
Silver medal – second place	1973 Gothenburg	Individual foil
Silver medal – second place	1974 Grenoble	Team foil
Silver medal – second place	1974 Grenoble	Individual foil
Silver medal – second place	1975 Budapest	Team foil
Silver medal – second place	1979 Melbourne	Team foil
Silver medal – second place	1982 Rome	Team foil
Bronze medal – third place	1977 Buenos Aires	Individual foil
Bronze medal – third place	1979 Melbourne	Individual foil
Bronze medal – third place	1981 Clermont-Ferrand	Team foil
Summer Universiade
Bronze medal – third place	1977 Sofia	Individual foil

Ildikó Tordasi (née Schwarczenberger; 9 September 1951 – 13 July 2015) was a Hungarian foil fencer. She competed in the 1972, 1976 and 1980 Olympics and won four medals.

Schwarczenberger was named Hungarian Sportswoman of The Year after winning the world title in 1973. In 1976, she won another world title and an Olympics gold medal. She died on 13 July 2015 at the age of 63.

Awards
Preceded by Andrea Gyarmati	Hungarian Sportswoman of The Year; 1973	Succeeded by Ilona Bruzsenyák
Preceded by Mariann Ambrus	Hungarian Sportswoman of The Year; 1976	Succeeded by Mariann Ambrus
