= Pál Gerevich =

Hungarian fencer (born 1948)

Personal information
- Born: 10 August 1948 (age 77) Budapest, Hungary

Sport
- Sport: Fencing
Medal record
Men's fencing
Representing Hungary
Olympic Games
Bronze medal – third place	1972 Munich	Team sabre
Bronze medal – third place	1980 Moscow	Team sabre
World Championships
Gold medal – first place	1973 Gothenburg	Team sabre
Gold medal – first place	1977 Buenos Aires	Individual sabre
Gold medal – first place	1978 Hamburg	Team sabre
Gold medal – first place	1981 Clermont-Ferrand	Team sabre
Gold medal – first place	1982 Rome	Team sabre
Silver medal – second place	1975 Budapest	Team sabre
Silver medal – second place	1977 Buenos Aires	Team sabre
Summer Universiade
Silver medal – second place	1970 Turin	Team sabre
Silver medal – second place	1973 Moscow	Individual sabre
Silver medal – second place	1973 Moscow	Team sabre

Pál Gerevich (born 10 August 1948) is a Hungarian fencer, who won two Olympic bronze medals in the team sabre competitions. Pál Gerevich won the world championships in sabre fencing in 1977 and is currently coaching the Viennese fencing club Wiener Sportclub.

He also was a member of the Hungarian team that won the world championships in 1973, 1978, 1981 and 1982, and won silver in 1975 and bronze in 1977. He was elected Hungarian Sportsman of the year in 1977.

He is the son of legendary fencer Aladár Gerevich and Olympic medalist Erna Bogen-Bogáti. His grandfather Albert Bogen who competed for Austria at the 1912 Summer Olympics (winning a silver medal in team sabre) and for Hungary at the 1928 Summer Olympics.

Awards
Preceded by Miklós Németh	Hungarian Sportsman of The Year; 1977	Succeeded by Zoltán Magyar
