= Fencing at the 1983 Mediterranean Games =

Fencing competition

- Location: Casablanca, Morocco
- Dates: September 1983

The fencing competition at the 1983 Mediterranean Games was held in Casablanca, Morocco.

== Medalists ==
=== Men's events ===
Event	Gold	Silver	Bronze
Individual épée	Sandro Cuomo (ITA)	Angelo Mazzoni (ITA)	Ángel Fernández (ESP)
Individual foil	Haluk Yamaç (TUR)	Ahmed Shafik (EGY)	Mauro Numa (ITA)
Individual sabre	Ferdinando Meglio (ITA)	Jean-François Lamour (FRA)	Valentín Paraíso (ESP)

=== Women's events ===
Event	Gold	Silver	Bronze
Individual foil	Dorina Vaccaroni (ITA)	Carola Cicconetti (ITA)	Aysel Güneş (TUR)

== Medal table ==
Rank	Nation	Gold	Silver	Bronze	Total
1	Italy (ITA)	3	2	1	6
2	Turkey (TUR)	1	0	1	2
3	Egypt (EGY)	0	1	0	1
3	France (FRA)	0	1	0	1
5	Spain (ESP)	0	0	2	2
Totals (5 entries)		4	4	4	12
