= Alexandr Romankov =

Soviet fencer (born 1953)

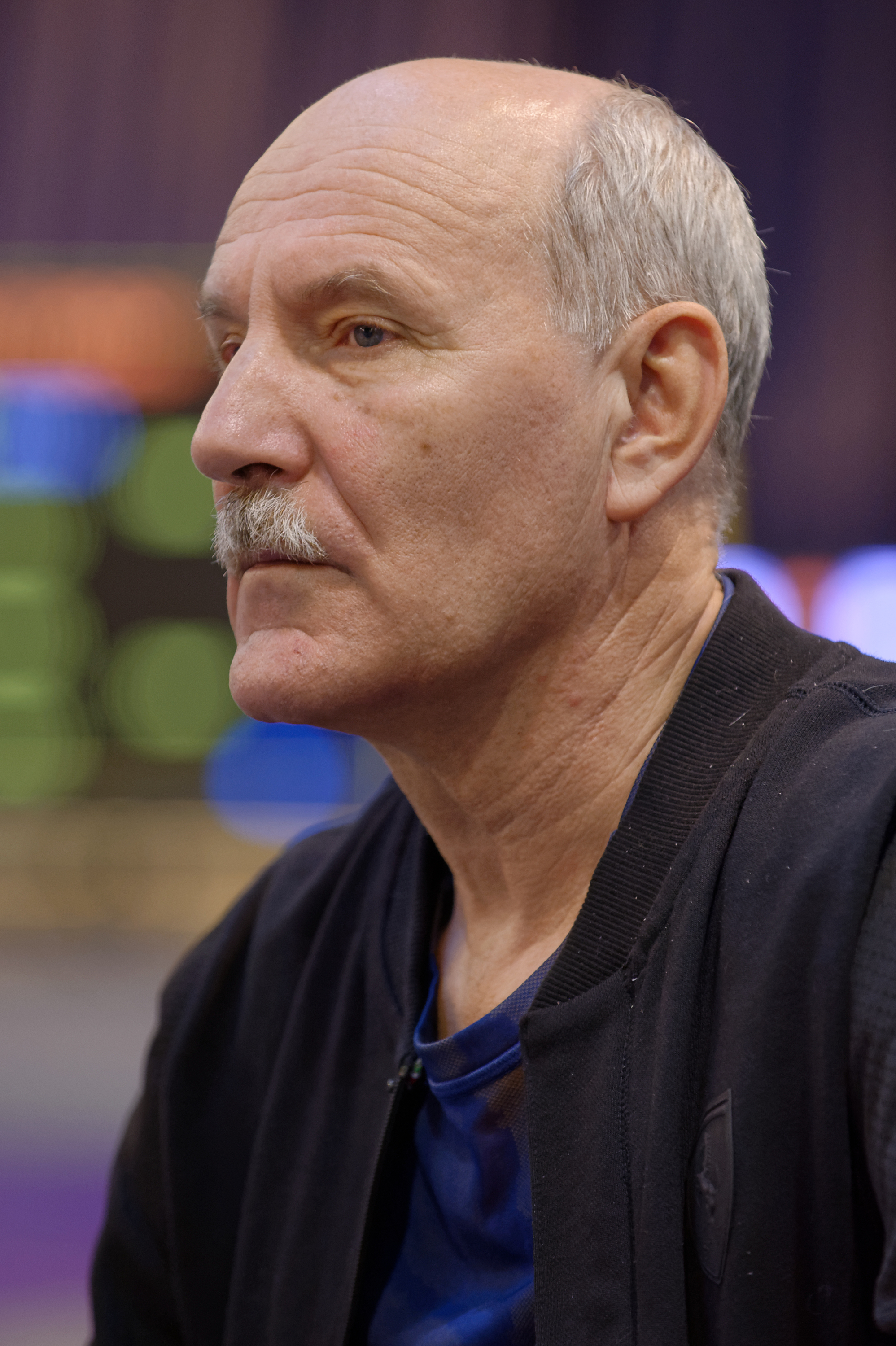
- Romankov in 2015

Personal information
- Full name: Alexandr Anatolyevich Romankov
- Born: 7 November 1953 (age 72) Korsakov, Sakhalin Oblast, Russian SFSR, USSR
- Height: 1.78 m (5 ft 10 in)
- Weight: 72 kg (159 lb)

Fencing career
- Sport: Fencing
- Country: Soviet Union
- Weapon: foil
- Hand: left-handed
Medal record
Representing Soviet Union
Men's fencing
Olympic Games
Gold medal – first place	1988 Seoul	Team foil
Silver medal – second place	1976 Montreal	Individual foil
Silver medal – second place	1980 Moscow	Team foil
Bronze medal – third place	1980 Moscow	Individual foil
Bronze medal – third place	1988 Seoul	Individual foil
World Championships
Gold medal – first place	1974 Grenoble	Individual foil
Gold medal – first place	1974 Grenoble	Team foil
Gold medal – first place	1977 Buenos Aires	Individual foil
Gold medal – first place	1979 Melbourne	Individual foil
Gold medal – first place	1979 Melbourne	Team foil
Gold medal – first place	1981 Clermont-Ferrand	Team foil
Gold medal – first place	1982 Rome	Individual foil
Gold medal – first place	1982 Rome	Team foil
Gold medal – first place	1983 Vienna	Team foil
Gold medal – first place	1989 Denver	Team foil
Silver medal – second place	1975 Budapest	Team foil
Silver medal – second place	1978 Hamburg	Individual foil
Bronze medal – third place	1977 Buenos Aires	Team foil
Bronze medal – third place	1978 Hamburg	Team foil
Bronze medal – third place	1985 Barcelona	Team foil
Summer Universiade
Gold medal – first place	1977 Sofia	Team foil
Gold medal – first place	1979 Mexico City	Individual foil
Gold medal – first place	1979 Mexico City	Team foil
Silver medal – second place	1981 Bucharest	Team foil
Bronze medal – third place	1977 Sofia	Individual foil

Alexandr Anatolyevich Romankov (Belarusian: Аляксандр Анатольевіч Раманькоў, romanized: Alyaksandr Anatolyevich Ramankow; Russian: Александр Анатольевич Романьков, romanized: Aleksandr Anatolyevich Romankov) is a former Belarusian fencer from the former Soviet Union, who was born on 7 November 1953 in the town of Korsakov on the island of Sakhalin (just north of Japan). He trained at Dynamo in Minsk and won a gold medal, two silver medals and two bronze medals at the three Olympic Games that he competed in between 1976 and 1988 ) .

== Achievements ==
Olympic Games

- Foil team (1988)
- Foil individual (1976) and Foil team (1980)
- Foil individual (1980, 1988)

Fencing World Cup

- Foil (1974, 1976)
- A ten-time World Champion (1977, 1983 - individual; 1981, 1989 - team; 1974, 1979, 1982 - individual and team).
- A seventeen-time Champion of the USSR.

== Honours ==
- Awarded the title of Chevallier Feyerick by the FIE.
- Has coached the National teams of Australia, Belarus, and Korea.
- Featured in the 2004 Guinness Book of World Records.
- Coached for a few years at FAW, the Fencing Academy of Westchester, in Westchester New York.
- Known sometimes as the "Tsar of Fencing".

== See also ==
- Multiple medallist at the World Fencing Championships
