= Dariusz Wódke =

Polish fencer

Dariusz Wódke (born 26 February 1957) is a Polish former world champion sabre fencer.

He won the individual sabre championship at the 1981 World Fencing Championships. He won bronze medals in team sabre at the 1979 World Fencing Championships and 1981 World Fencing Championships.

After retiring from competitions, he became a fencing coach in Italy. He has been the first fencing coach of Camilla Mancini (world gold 2017, team foil) and followed the development of Manuela Spica (Italian junior champion 2023).
