= Ferdinando Meglio =

Italian fencer (born 1959)

Personal information
- Born: 27 June 1959 (age 67) Naples, Italy

Sport
- Sport: Fencing
Medal record
Men's fencing
Representing Italy
Olympic Games
Gold medal – first place	1984 Los Angeles	Team sabre
Silver medal – second place	1980 Moscow	Team sabre
Bronze medal – third place	1988 Seoul	Team sabre
World Championships
Silver medal – second place	1979 Melbourne	Team sabre
Silver medal – second place	1982 Rome	Team sabre
Bronze medal – third place	1983 Vienna	Team sabre
Mediterranean Games
Gold medal – first place	1983 Casablanca	Individual sabre
Gold medal – first place	1991 Athens	Individual sabre
Summer Universiade
Gold medal – first place	1981 Bucharest	Team sabre
Silver medal – second place	1983 Edmonton	Team sabre
Bronze medal – third place	1987 Zagreb	Individual sabre
Bronze medal – third place	1987 Zagreb	Team sabre

Ferdinando Meglio (born 27 June 1959) is an Italian fencer. In the team sabre events he won a gold medal at the 1984 Summer Olympics, a silver at the 1980 Summer Olympics and a bronze at the 1988 Summer Olympics. He also competed in the individual sabre event at the Mediterranean Games winning gold medals in 1983 and 1991.
