= Philippe Riboud =

French fencer (born 1957)

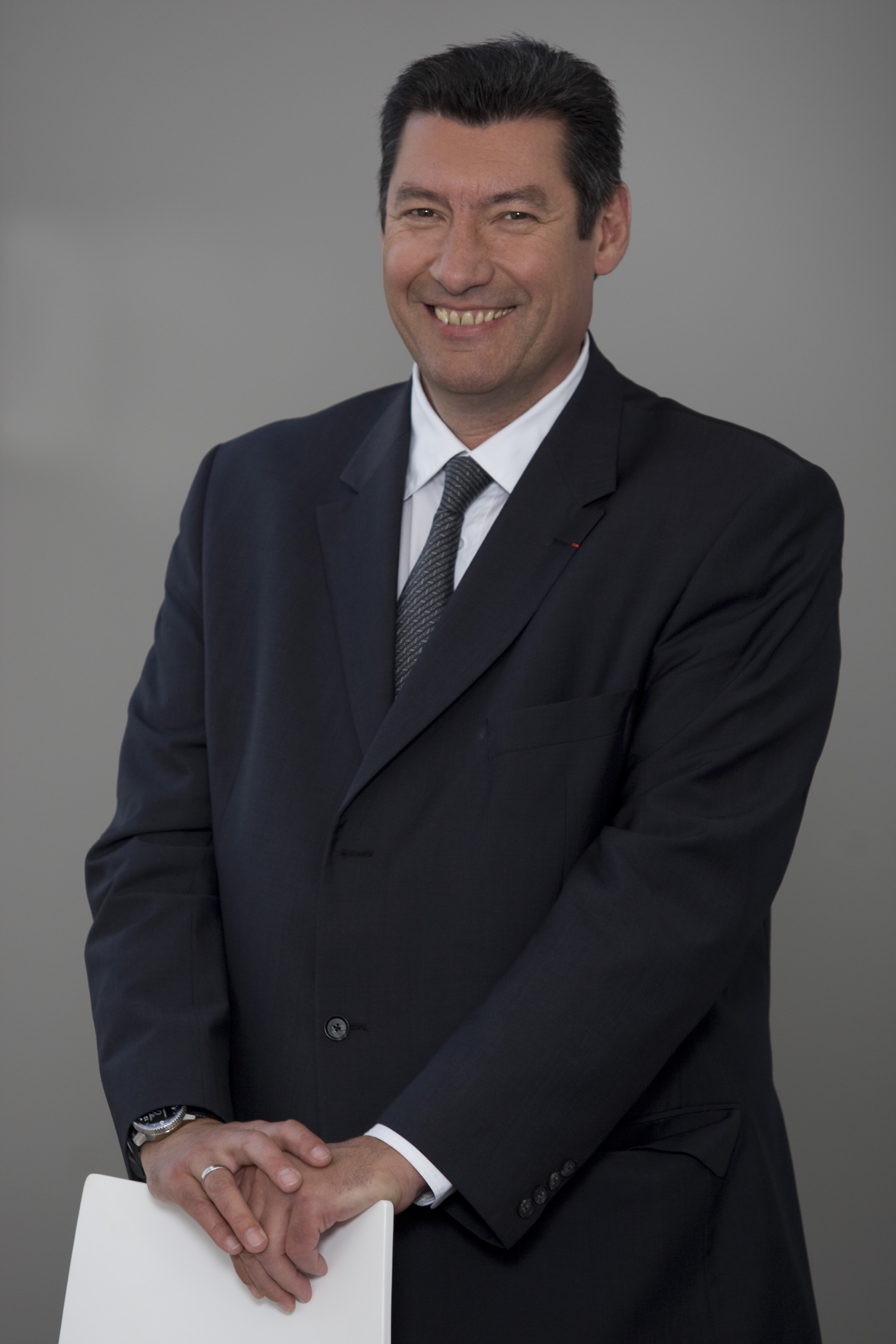
- Philippe Riboud (2008)

Personal information
- Born: 9 April 1957 (age 69) Lyon, France

Sport
- Sport: Fencing
Medal record
Men's fencing
Representing France
Olympic Games
Gold medal – first place	1980 Moscow	Team épée
Gold medal – first place	1988 Seoul	Team épée
Silver medal – second place	1984 Los Angeles	Team épée
Silver medal – second place	1988 Seoul	Individual épée
Bronze medal – third place	1980 Moscow	Individual épée
Bronze medal – third place	1984 Los Angeles	Individual épée
World Championships
Gold medal – first place	1979 Melbourne	Individual épé
Gold medal – first place	1982 Rome	Team épée
Gold medal – first place	1986 Sofia	Individual épée
Silver medal – second place	1978 Hamburg	Individual épée
Silver medal – second place	1982 Rome	Individual épée
Silver medal – second place	1990 Lyon	Team épée
Bronze medal – third place	1985 Barcelona	Individual épée
Bronze medal – third place	1987 Lausanne	Team épée
Mediterranean Games
Gold medal – first place	1979 Split	Individual épée
Silver medal – second place	1975 Algiers	Individual épée
Summer Universiade
Gold medal – first place	1977 Sofia	Individual épée
Silver medal – second place	1977 Sofia	Team épée

Philippe Claude Riboud (born 9 April 1957) is a French fencer. He won two golds, two silvers and two bronze medals at three Olympic Games. He also competed at the Mediterranean Games in the individual épée event winning gold medal in 1979 and a silver medal in 1975. He was vice-president of the French Fencing Federation after the Olympic Games of 1988.
