= Michele Maffei =

Italian fencer (born 1946)

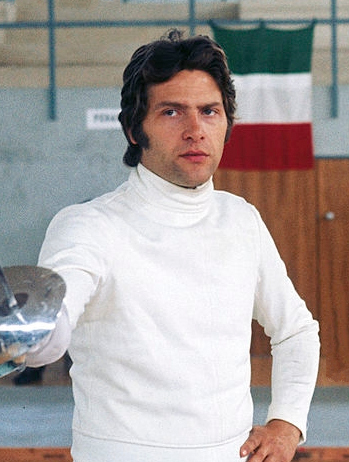
- Michele Maffei at the 1972 Olympics

Personal information
- Born: 11 November 1946 (age 79) Rome, Italy
- Height: 1.78 m (5 ft 10 in)
- Weight: 79 kg (174 lb)

Sport
- Sport: Fencing
Medal record
Representing Italy
Olympic Games
| Gold medal – first place | 1972 Munich | Team sabre |
| Silver medal – second place | 1968 Mexico City | Team sabre |
| Silver medal – second place | 1976 Montréal | Team sabre |
| Silver medal – second place | 1980 Moscow | Team sabre |
World Championships
| Gold medal – first place | 1971 Vienna | Individual sabre |
| Silver medal – second place | 1979 Melbourne | Team sabre |
| Bronze medal – third place | 1971 Vienna | Team sabre |
| Bronze medal – third place | 1973 Gothenburg | Team sabre |
| Bronze medal – third place | 1974 Grenoble | Team sabre |
| Bronze medal – third place | 1978 Hamburg | Individual sabre |
| Bronze medal – third place | 1978 Hamburg | Team sabre |
| Bronze medal – third place | 1981 Clermont-Ferrand | Individual sabre |
| Bronze medal – third place | 1982 Rome | Team sabre |
| Bronze medal – third place | 1983 Vienna | Team sabre |
Mediterranean Games
| Gold medal – first place | 1975 Algiers | Individual sabre |
| Gold medal – first place | 1979 Split | Individual sabre |
| Bronze medal – third place | 1967 Tunis | Individual sabre |
Summer Universiade
| Silver medal – second place | 1970 Turin | Individual sabre |
| Bronze medal – third place | 1970 Turin | Team sabre |

Michele Maffei (born 11 November 1946) is a retired Italian fencer. He won a gold and three silver medals in the team sabre events at four Olympic Games. He also competed at the Mediterranean Games where he won gold medals in the individual sabre event in the 1975 and 1979 and a bronze medal at the 1967.
