= Khristo Etropolski =

Bulgarian fencer (born 1959)

Personal information
- Born: 18 March 1959 (age 67) Sofia, Bulgaria

Sport
- Sport: Fencing
Medal record
Representing Bulgaria
World Championships
Silver medal – second place	1985 Barcelona	Individual sabre
Silver medal – second place	1985 Barcelona	Team sabre
Silver medal – second place	1987 Lausanne	Team sabre
Bronze medal – third place	1983 Vienna	Individual sabre
Bronze medal – third place	1986 Sofia	Team sabre
Summer Universiade
Silver medal – second place	1985 Kobe	Team sabre

Khristo Etropolski (Bulgarian: Христо Етрополски, born 18 March 1959) is a Bulgarian fencer. He competed in the individual and team sabre events at the 1980 and 1988 Summer Olympics. He is the twin brother of Vasil Etropolski, who also fenced for Bulgaria at the Olympics.
