= Marco Romano (fencer) =

Italian fencer (born 1953)

Personal information
- Born: 6 May 1953 (age 73) Naples, Italy

Sport
- Sport: Fencing
Medal record
Men's fencing
Representing Italy
Olympic Games
| Silver medal – second place | 1980 Moscow | Sabre, team |

Marco Romano (born 6 May 1953) is an Italian fencer and physician. He won a silver medal in the team sabre event at the 1980 Summer Olympics. He works as professor and physician at the Second University of Naples and in 2013 was elected councilor for the 'Società Italiana di Gastroenterologia' in the National Societies Forum (NSF) of the United European Gastroenterology.
