= Olivier Carrard =

Swiss fencer

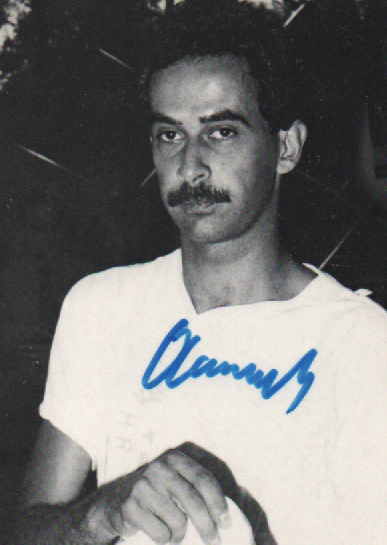
- Olivier Carrard

Personal information
- Born: 19 November 1956 (age 69)

Sport
- Sport: Fencing

Olivier Carrard (born 19 November 1956) is a Swiss fencer. He competed in the team épée event at the 1984 Summer Olympics.
