= Ion Pantelimonescu =

Romanian fencer (born 1956)

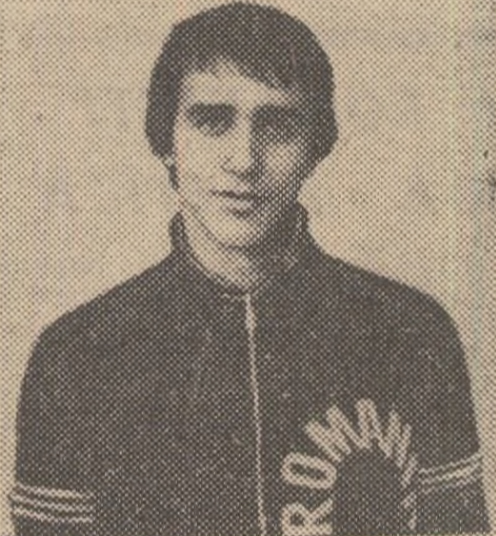
- Pantelimonescu in 1977

Personal information
- Born: 15 May 1956 (age 70)

Sport
- Sport: Fencing

Ion Pantelimonescu (born 15 May 1956) is a Romanian fencer. He competed in the team sabre event at the 1980 Summer Olympics.
