= Valentín Paraíso =

Spanish fencer

Personal information
- Born: 13 March 1955 (age 71)

Sport
- Sport: Fencing
Medal record
Mediterranean Games
Bronze medal – third place	1983 Casablanca	Individual sabre

Valentín Paraíso (born 13 March 1955) is a Spanish fencer. He competed in the individual sabre event at the 1980 Summer Olympics. He won a bronze medal in the individual sabre event at the 1983 Mediterranean Games.
