= 1968 Olympics =

1968 Olympics may refer to:

- 1968 Summer Olympics, which were held in Mexico City, Mexico
- 1968 Winter Olympics, which were held in Grenoble, France
