= Rüdiger Müller =

German fencer

Personal information
- Born: 13 February 1955 (age 71) Mügeln, Bezirk Leipzig, East Germany

Sport
- Sport: Fencing

Rüdiger Müller (born 13 February 1955) is a German fencer. He competed in the individual and team sabre events for East Germany at the 1980 Summer Olympics.
