= Vasil Etropolski =

Bulgarian fencer (born 1959)

Personal information
- Full name: Vasil Mihaylov•Etropolski
- Born: Васил Михайлов•Етрополски; 18 March 1959 (age 67) Sofia, Bulgaria
- Employer: New York Athletic Club
- Height: 183 cm (6 ft 0 in)

Sport
- Sport: Fencing
- Event: Sabre

Achievements and titles
- World finals: 1983 sabre world champion
Medal record
Representing Bulgaria
World Championships
Gold medal – first place	1983 Vienna	Individual sabre
Silver medal – second place	1985 Barcelona	Team sabre
Silver medal – second place	1987 Lausanne	Team sabre
Bronze medal – third place	1985 Barcelona	Individual sabre
Bronze medal – third place	1986 Sofia	Individual sabre
Bronze medal – third place	1986 Sofia	Team sabre
Summer Universiade
Silver medal – second place	1985 Kobe	Team sabre
Bronze medal – third place	1981 Bucharest	Individual sabre
Bronze medal – third place	1985 Kobe	Individual sabre

Vasil Etropolski (born 18 March 1959) is a Bulgarian fencer and fencing coach. He competed in the individual and team sabre events at the 1980 and 1988 Summer Olympics. He also won the 1983 sabre world championship. He is the twin brother of Khristo Etropolski, who also fenced for Bulgaria at the 1980 and 1988 Olympics.

At the New York Athletic Club he coached Stephen Kovacs, a sabre fencer who in 1989 won the United States Fencing Association (USFA) Under-17 saber championship, and in 1990 won the USFA Under-20 (Junior) saber championship. Kovacs later became a fencing coach, was charged with the sexual assault of two of his students, and died in prison in 2022.
