= Fencing at the 1970 Summer Universiade =

Fencing events were contested at the 1970 Summer Universiade in Turin, Italy.

== Medal overview ==
=== Men's events ===
Event	Gold	Silver	Bronze
Individual foil	Leonid Romanov (URS)	Vasyl Stankovych (URS)	Marek Dąbrowski (POL)
Team foil	Soviet Union (URS)	Poland (POL)	Hungary (HUN)
Individual épée	Sergey Paramonov (URS)	Nicola Granieri (ITA)	István Osztrics (HUN)
Team épée	West Germany (FRG)	Hungary (HUN)	Italy (ITA)
Individual sabre	Viktor Sidyak (URS)	Michele Maffei (ITA)	Vladimir Nazlymov (URS)
Team sabre	Soviet Union (URS)	Hungary (HUN)	Italy (ITA)

=== Women's events ===
Event	Gold	Silver	Bronze
Individual foil	Agnes Simonffy (HUN)	Ecaterina Stahl (ROM)	Mariya Scakolina (URS)
Team foil	Soviet Union (URS)	Romania (ROM)	Hungary (HUN)

== Medal table ==
Rank	Nation	Gold	Silver	Bronze	Total
1	Soviet Union (URS)	6	1	2	9
2	Hungary (HUN)	1	2	3	6
3	West Germany (FRG)	1	0	0	1
4	Italy (ITA)	0	2	2	4
5	Romania (ROM)	0	2	0	2
6	Poland (POL)	0	1	1	2
Totals (6 entries)		8	8	8	24
