= Vladimir Nazlymov =

Soviet-American fencer

Personal information
- Native name: Владимир Аливерович Назлымов
- Full name: Vladimir Aliverovich Nazlymov
- Nationality: Soviet-born
- Born: 1 November 1945 (age 80) Makhachkala, Daghestan, Russian SFSR, Soviet Union
- Height: 5 ft 9 in (1.75 m)
- Weight: 161 lb (73 kg)
- Children: Vitali Nazlymov
- Relative: Tatiana Nazlymov (granddaughter) Andrei Nazlymov (grandson)

Sport
- Country: Soviet Union
- Sport: Fencing
- Event: Sabre
- Club: Moscow Central Army Sports Club
Medal record
Men's fencing
Representing Soviet Union
Olympic Games
Gold medal – first place	1968 Mexico City	Team sabre
Gold medal – first place	1976 Montreal	Team sabre
Gold medal – first place	1980 Moscow	Team sabre
Silver medal – second place	1972 Munich	Team sabre
Silver medal – second place	1976 Montreal	Individual sabre
Bronze medal – third place	1972 Munich	Individual sabre
World Championships
Gold medal – first place	1967 Montreal	Team sabre
Gold medal – first place	1969 Havana	Team sabre
Gold medal – first place	1970 Ankara	Team sabre
Gold medal – first place	1971 Vienna	Team sabre
Gold medal – first place	1974 Grenoble	Team sabre
Gold medal – first place	1975 Budapest	Individual sabre
Gold medal – first place	1975 Budapest	Team sabre
Gold medal – first place	1977 Buenos Aires	Team sabre
Gold medal – first place	1979 Melbourne	Individual sabre
Gold medal – first place	1979 Melbourne	Team sabre
Silver medal – second place	1973 Gothenburg	Team sabre
Silver medal – second place	1977 Buenos Aires	Individual sabre
Silver medal – second place	1978 Hamburg	Team sabre
Bronze medal – third place	1970 Ankara	Individual sabre
Bronze medal – third place	1973 Gothenburg	Individual sabre
Summer Universiade
Gold medal – first place	1970 Turin	Team sabre
Gold medal – first place	1973 Moscow	Individual sabre
Gold medal – first place	1973 Moscow	Team sabre
Bronze medal – third place	1970 Turin	Individual sabre

Vladimir Aliverovich Nazlymov (born November 1, 1945; Russian: Владимир Аливерович Назлымов) is a former sabre fencer, and coach for the USSR and later the United States, to which he moved in 1991, of Crimean Tatar origin. He won three team Olympic sabre gold medals, and was the head coach of the Soviet Union Military Fencing Team for 14 years. He then coached in the United States, notably for Ohio State University, from which he retired in lieu of termination during an NCAA investigation that found him guilty of aggravated level I violations, sanctioned him, and vacated a number of records of the team and its members. He now serves as a coach at the Nazlymov Fencing Foundation, which was founded by his son and daughter-in-law.

== Early years ==
Nazlymov was born in Makhachkala, Daghestan, Russian SFSR, Soviet Union, to a Crimean Tatar family. He said in an interview that when he was a child, he was "not a nice kid," and was constantly in trouble.

Nazlymov graduated from the Faculty of Physical Education of the Dagestan State Pedagogical Institute in 1969 as a teacher.

Nazlymov served 25 years in the Soviet Army, where he was a colonel. He was in a special regimen where he was able to fence full-time with the CSKA Moscow Central Army Sports Club team in Moscow, a department of the Russian Defense Ministry.

== Fencing career ==
Nazlymov began fencing in Makhachkala. Competing for the Soviet Union, he was a three-time Olympic team gold medalist (1968, 1976, 1980), team silver medalist (1972), and individual silver and bronze medalist (1976, 1972). In addition, he was an 8-time team world champion, and twice won the individual world championship (1975, 1979). He was a world championship silver medalist in 1977, and bronze medalist in 1970 and 1973. In the 1970s, he was the USSR individual sabre champion six times. The Soviet Union awarded him the title of Master of the Sport of the USSR (fencing) in 1968.

== Coaching career ==
=== USSR ===
Nazlymov's coaching career began in Moscow as the head coach of the Soviet Union Military Fencing Team from 1976 to 1990. He said the team had the best facilities, as "Army is army. They have everything." The Central Army Sports Club (ЦСКА) in Moscow was a Soviet national team training facility. From 1970 to 1980, Nazlymov served as the captain of the fencing team of the Soviet Union at the Olympics. His students won two Olympic gold medals and 12 world championships, as well as eight European Championship crowns. From 1986 to 1988, Nazlymov served as the head coach of the Soviet National Fencing Team. The USSR won a gold medal at the 1986 World Championships and silver medals at the 1987 Worlds and 1988 Olympics.

=== United States ===
Nazlymov moved to the United States with his family in 1991. Years later, commenting on his allegiance to Russia, he said: "I didn't even change my passport. I lived in the States for many years, but never left Russia." From 1991 to 1999, he was a fencing coach at Central High School, an inner-city high school in Kansas City, Missouri. He captained the USA team at the World Championships from 1995 to 1997 and at the 1995 and 1997 World University Games. Nazlymov also served as the sabre coach for the U.S. National Team from 1994 to 1999. Nazlymov guided U.S. teams to a ninth-place finish at the 1996 Olympics, third place at the 1997 Junior World Championships, and 12th place at the Senior World Championships. He was named a coach for the U.S. 1999 Pan American Games and 1999 Senior World Championships teams. His US Junior Team finished in second place in the overall medal count at the Junior Worlds in 2001. In 1999, he was named Coach of the Year by the United States Fencing Association. In 2019, Nazlymov became the sabre coach of the Uzbekistan national fencing team.

==== Ohio State University ====
In the end of 1999, Nazlymov was hired by Ohio State University (OSU), after spending eight years as the fencing coach for the Kansas City, Missouri School District and establishing a private club in the Kansas City area (KCFC). In the 2003–04 and 2007–08 seasons, Nazlymov guided Ohio State Buckeyes to the NCAA Fencing Championship, and produced a number of individual NCAA champions (Adam Crompton, Boaz Ellis, Andras Horanyi). Two of his students, Jason Rogers and Louise Bond-Williams, qualified for the 2004 Olympic Games in Athens, and OSU fencing team member Siobhan Byrne participated at the 2008 Olympic Games in Beijing. At OSU as of 2005, Nazlymov's fencers had a combined record of 292–148 (.614), but after a subsequent NCAA investigation many of his later wins were vacated by the NCAA. In 2015–16, he was paid $223,693 for coaching at OSU. He retired from coaching at OSU in Spring 2018.

=== NCAA investigation and sanctions ===
While Nazlymov had retired in 2018, in 2020 his departure was revised from "retired" to "retired in lieu of termination." That year, as the NCAA was investigating the OSU fencing program for infractions, OSU self-imposed a 2020–21 postseason ban for its fencing program.

In April 2022, the NCAA Division I Committee on Infractions panel, upon the conclusion of an investigation, found that Nazlymov had violated NCAA head coach responsibility rules, and was guilty of aggravated level I violations. Further, he violated ethical conduct rules, by ignoring several requests that had been made to him to cooperate with the NCAA investigation. The panel found that:

"The head fencing coach violated fundamental, well-known bylaws. Worse, the head fencing coach received relevant education on the exact areas of the violations as they were occurring, but continued to commit the same violations and, in some circumstances, concealed them from compliance staff."

The NCAA said Nazlymov arranged, provided, or directed other coaches to give more than $6,000 in recruiting inducements to three fencers, primarily by giving them free access to the OSU fencing facility. Two of the prospects also received free meals and free private lessons from Nazylmov, which allowed OSU coaches to observe the fencers, and constituted impermissible tryouts, and received other inducements. It also found that under Nazlymov's direction, in addition 18 student fencers also received impermissible benefits worth over $8,000 in the form of free access to his local fencing club, resulting in them competing while ineligible.

The NCAA sanctioned Nazlymov with a 10-year show-cause order. He was restricted from any athletically related duties by any NCAA school hiring him, unless that school could demonstrate why such restriction should not apply. If Nazlymov is hired after his show cause order ends, he will be suspended from 100% of his first season of employment.

The NCAA also meted out additional punishments to the school athletic department and fencing program. The Ohio State fencing team was placed on four years of probation for NCAA violations committed between 2015 and 2019. In addition, the OSU athletic department was fined, and the OSU fencing program budget was reduced by 3%. The fencing program scholarship program was reduced by 10% for the 2022–23 academic year. Team wins and championships, and individual records for affected fencers, were vacated, including the 2016 and 2017 second-place finishes and a 2018 third-place finish in the NCAAs for the fencing team, and Midwest Fencing Conference championships in 2016, 2017, and 2018.

== Officiating ==
Nazlymov officiated sabre fencing at the 1988 Olympic Games.

== Family ==
Nazlymov's son, Vitali, attended Penn State University and won the 1991 individual NCAA saber championship.

His granddaughter Tatiana Nazlymov trains in saber at the Nazlymov Fencing Foundation founded by her father (Vitali) and mother, where Vladimir also coaches, with Fikrat Valiyev as her primary coach. In December 2023, Phil Andrews, the CEO of USA Fencing, wrote to the International Fencing Federation that there was "likely to be improper officiating" of bouts involving Tatiana Nazlymov, and that video evidence indicated that calls made by two referees in bouts involving her demonstrated "a likely favoritism" toward her; in addition, in a letter to Tatiana that month he informed her that "we are aware of this alleged manipulation of the sport." Her mother, Vladimir's daughter-in-law, wrote that "Tatiana is absolutely innocent and the cheating/matchfixing accusation is ridiculous." Vitali Nazlymov said that he himself behaved according to the rules, but that "fencing is a small world and conflicts exist everywhere." Tatiana has qualified for Team USA in the 2024 Olympics.

== Clubs ==
Nazlymov owned a club in Columbus, Ohio, called the Fencing Alliance of Ohio. The club disbanded in 2018.

In 2016 in Russia, an order was given in the Republic of Dagestan, Makhachkala, by region Governor Ramazan Abdulatipov to create a fencing school named after Nazlymov.

In 2018, his son Vitali and daughter-in-law established Nazlymov Fencing Foundation in Bethesda, Maryland. He joined it that year as a coach after leaving Ohio State University, joining coach and referee Fikrat Valiyev and coach and former Russian national team member Alex Filatov, along with his son who is also a coach and referee. His son is the principal officer. Most of its fencers are saber fencers.

== Writing ==
Nazlymov wrote the foreword to Foil, Saber, and Épée Fencing: Skills, Safety, Operations, and Responsibilities (1994) by Maxwell R. Garret, Guglielmo Pezza, and Emmanuil G. Kaidanov.

== See also ==
- List of Olympic medalists in fencing (men)
- Hugh Freeze, college coach found guilty of NCAA level 1 violations
