= Frank-Eberhard Höltje =

German fencer

Personal information
- Born: 21 August 1953 (age 72) Salzwedel, Bezirk Magdeburg, East Germany

Sport
- Sport: Fencing

Frank-Eberhard Höltje (born 21 August 1953) is a German fencer. He competed in the individual and team sabre events for East Germany at the 1980 Summer Olympics.
