= Peter Ulbrich =

German fencer

Personal information
- Born: 17 August 1955 (age 71) Karl-Marx-Stadt, German Democratic Republic

Sport
- Sport: Fencing

Peter Ulbrich (born 17 August 1955) is a German fencer. He competed in the individual and team sabre events for East Germany at the 1980 Summer Olympics.
