= Georgi Chomakov =

Bulgarian fencer

Personal information
- Born: 6 April 1959 (age 67) Plovdiv, Bulgaria

Sport
- Sport: Fencing

Georgi Chomakov (Bulgarian: Георги Чомаков) (born 6 April 1959) is a Bulgarian fencer. He competed in the individual and team sabre events at the 1980 Summer Olympics, and the team sabre event at the 1988 Summer Olympics.

In 1984, Chomakov announced that he will not compete in the 1984 Olympics in Los Angeles due to a boycott.

In 1983, he finished third in the European Individual Championships. In 1985 and 1987, he finished second in the World Championships with the Bulgarian sabre team.

He is the father of Margarita Tschomakova, a Bulgarian sabre fencer.
