= José Laverdecia =

Cuban fencer (born 1960)

Personal information
- Born: 6 August 1960 (age 65)

Sport
- Sport: Fencing

José Laverdecia (born 6 August 1960) is a Cuban fencer. He competed in the individual and team sabre events at the 1980 Summer Olympics.
