= Fencing at the 1973 Summer Universiade =

Fencing events were contested at the 1973 Summer Universiade in Moscow, Soviet Union.

== Medal overview ==
=== Men's events ===
Event	Gold	Silver	Bronze
Individual foil	Vasyl Stankovych (URS)	Mihai Tiu (ROU)	Stefano Simoncelli (ITA)
Team foil	Soviet Union (URS)	Poland (POL)	Hungary (HUN)
Individual épée	István Osztrics (HUN)	Gábor Muskovszky (HUN)	Boris Lukomsky (URS)
Team épée	Soviet Union (URS)	Hungary (HUN)	Italy (ITA)
Individual sabre	Vladimir Nazlymov (URS)	Pál Gerevich (HUN)	Dan Irimiciuc (ROU)
Team sabre	Soviet Union (URS)	Hungary (HUN)	Poland (POL)

=== Women's events ===
Event	Gold	Silver	Bronze
Individual foil	Valentina Burochkina (URS)	Elena Belova (URS)	Valentina Nikonova (URS)
Team foil	Soviet Union (URS)	Romania (ROU)	Poland (POL)

== Medals table ==
Rank	Nation	Gold	Silver	Bronze	Total
1	Soviet Union (URS)	7	1	2	10
2	Hungary (HUN)	1	4	1	6
3	Romania (ROU)	0	2	1	3
4	Poland (POL)	0	1	2	3
5	Italy (ITA)	0	0	2	2
Totals (5 entries)		8	8	8	24
