= 1977 World Fencing Championships =

International fencing competition

1977 World Championships in Fencing
- Host city: Buenos Aires, Argentina

The 1977 World Fencing Championships were held in Buenos Aires, Argentina. The event took place from July 14 to July 24, 1977.

== Medal table ==
Rank	Nation	Gold	Silver	Bronze	Total
1	Soviet Union (URS)	4	2	2	8
2	Sweden (SWE)	2	1	0	3
3	West Germany (FRG)	1	2	0	3
4	Hungary (HUN)	1	0	2	3
5	Italy (ITA)	0	1	2	3
6	Romania (ROU)	0	1	1	2
6	Switzerland (SUI)	0	1	1	2
Totals (7 entries)		8	8	8	24

== Medal summary ==
=== Men's events ===
Event	Gold	Silver	Bronze
Individual Foil	(Soviet Union) Alexandr Romankov	(West Germany) Harald Hein	(Italy) Carlo Montano
Team Foil	West Germany	Italy	Soviet Union
Individual Sabre	(Hungarian People's Republic) Pál Gerevich	(Soviet Union) Vladimir Nazlymov	(Italy) Angelo Arcidiacono
Team Sabre	Soviet Union	(Socialist Republic of Romania) Romania	(Hungarian People's Republic) Hungary
Individual Épée	(Sweden) Johan Harmenberg	(Sweden) Rolf Edling	(Switzerland) Patrice Gaille
Team Épée	Sweden	Switzerland	Soviet Union

=== Women's events ===
Event	Gold	Silver	Bronze
Individual Foil	(Soviet Union) Valentina Sidorova	(Soviet Union) Elena Belova	(Hungarian People's Republic) Ildikó Schwarczenberger
Team Foil	Soviet Union	West Germany	(Socialist Republic of Romania) Romania
