= Fencing at the 1979 Summer Universiade =

Fencing events were contested at the 1979 Summer Universiade in Mexico City, Mexico.

== Medal overview ==
=== Men's events ===
Event	Gold	Silver	Bronze
Individual foil	Alexandr Romankov (URS)	Vladimir Viktorovich Smirnov (URS)	Klaus Haertter (GDR)
Team foil	Soviet Union (URS)	Italy (ITA)	East Germany (GDR)
Individual épée	Ernő Kolczonay (HUN)	Leonid Dunayev (URS)	Hanns Jana (FRG)
Team épée	Hungary (HUN)	Soviet Union (URS)	Romania (ROM)
Individual sabre	Imre Gedővári (HUN)	Mikhail Burtsev (URS)	Marin Mustata (ROM)
Team sabre	Soviet Union (URS)	Hungary (HUN)	Poland (POL)

=== Women's events ===
Event	Gold	Silver	Bronze
Individual foil	Pascale Trinquet (FRA)	Cornelia Hanisch (FRG)	Mandy Niklaus (GDR)
Team foil	East Germany (GDR)	Soviet Union (URS)	West Germany (FRG)

== Medal table ==
Rank	Nation	Gold	Silver	Bronze	Total
1	Soviet Union (URS)	3	5	0	8
2	Hungary (HUN)	3	1	0	4
3	East Germany (GDR)	1	0	3	4
4	France (FRA)	1	0	0	1
5	West Germany (FRG)	0	1	2	3
6	Italy (ITA)	0	1	0	1
7	Romania (ROM)	0	0	2	2
8	Poland (POL)	0	0	1	1
Totals (8 entries)		8	8	8	24
