= CSKA Sports Complex =

Sports venue in Moscow, Russia

Coordinates: 55.791076°N 37.538824°E

The CSKA Sports Complex is an Olympic Village that is part of CSKA Moscow and was prepared to the 1980 Summer Olympics. It is located right next to a military air field.

Its athletics fieldhouse hosted the wrestling competitions while its football fieldhouse hosted the fencing and the fencing part of the modern pentathlon competitions.

== List of sports grounds ==
- Alexander Gomelsky Universal Sports Hall CSKA (formerly CSKA Palace of Sports)
- Light-Athletic Football Complex CSKA
- CSKA Ice Palace
- CSKA Swimming Pool
- CSKA Palace of Sports Martial Arts (formerly CSKA Weightlifting Hall)
- CSKA Gymnastics Hall
- CSKA Tennis Hall

== List of sports grounds outside complex ==
- CSKA Equestrian Resort
- CSKA Shooting Range
- Hills of Krylatskoye, sports ski resort (built in 2002)
- Peschanoye Universal Sports Resort (Grigory Fedotov Stadium)
- Vatutinki Sports Training Resort
