= Jesús Ortiz (fencer) =

Cuban fencer (born 1954)

Personal information
- Born: 17 April 1954 (age 71)

Sport
- Sport: Fencing

Jesús Ortiz (born 17 April 1954) is a Cuban fencer. He competed in the individual and team sabre events at the 1980 Summer Olympics.
