= Fencing at the 1977 Summer Universiade =

International fencing championship event

- Venue: Sofia Festival Hall
- Dates: 18–28 August 1977
- Competitors: 182 from 27 nations

The fencing events at the 1977 Summer Universiade were held from August 18 to 28, 1977, at the Sofia Festival Hall in Sofia, Bulgaria.

== Participant nations/NUSFs ==
27 National University Sporting Federations (NUSF)s participated in this event.

1. Austria (4)
2. Belgium (2)
3. Bulgaria (15)
4. Canada (2)
5. China (6)
6. Cuba (1)
7. East Germany (4)
8. Egypt (3)
9. Finland (1)
10. France (2)
11. Great Britain (5)
12. Hungary (15)
13. Italy (10)
14. Japan (6)
15. South Korea (2)
16. Netherlands (2)
17. Mexico (2)
18. Poland (8)
19. Romania (15)
20. Switzerland (3)
21. Sweden (3)
22. Czechoslovakia (4)
23. Turkey (2)
24. West Germany (9)
25. United States (12)
26. Soviet Union (15)
27. Yugoslavia (4)

== Medal overview ==
=== Men's events ===
Event	Gold	Silver	Bronze
Individual foil	Sabirzhan Ruziyev (URS)	Klaus Haertter (GDR)	Aleksandr Romankov (URS)
Team foil	Soviet Union (URS)	Poland (POL)	Italy (ITA)
Individual épée	Philippe Riboud (FRA)	Boris Lukomsky (URS)	François Suchanecki (SUI)
Team épée	Romania (ROU)	France (FRA)	Soviet Union (URS)
Individual sabre	Cornel Marin (ROU)	Angelo Arcidiacono (ITA)	Dan Irimiciuc (ROU)
Team sabre	Romania (ROU)	Hungary (HUN)	Soviet Union (URS)

=== Women's events ===
Event	Gold	Silver	Bronze
Individual foil	Katarina Raczová (TCH)	Cornelia Hanisch (FRG)	Ildikó Schwarczenberger (HUN)
Team foil	Soviet Union (URS)	Romania (ROU)	France (FRA)

== Medal table ==
Rank	Nation	Gold	Silver	Bronze	Total
1	Soviet Union (URS)	3	1	3	7
2	Romania (ROU)	3	1	1	5
3	France (FRA)	1	1	1	3
4	Czechoslovakia (TCH)	1	0	0	1
5	Hungary (HUN)	0	1	1	2
5	Italy (ITA)	0	1	1	2
7	East Germany (GDR)	0	1	0	1
7	Poland (POL)	0	1	0	1
7	West Germany (FRG)	0	1	0	1
10	Switzerland (SUI)	0	0	1	1
Totals (10 entries)		8	8	8	24
