= 1986 World Fencing Championships =

International fencing competition

1986 World Championships in Fencing
- Host city: (People's Republic of Bulgaria) Sofia, Bulgaria

The 1986 World Fencing Championships were held in Sofia, Bulgaria. The event took place from July 25 to August 3, 1986.

== Medal table ==
* Host nation (Bulgaria)

Rank	Nation	Gold	Silver	Bronze	Total
1	Soviet Union (URS)	3	1	1	5
2	West Germany (FRG)	2	2	1	5
3	Italy (ITA)	2	1	2	5
4	France (FRA)	1	0	1	2
5	Cuba (CUB)	0	1	0	1
5	Hungary (HUN)	0	1	0	1
5	Poland (POL)	0	1	0	1
5	Romania (ROU)	0	1	0	1
9	Bulgaria (BUL)*	0	0	2	2
10	East Germany (GDR)	0	0	1	1
Totals (10 entries)		8	8	8	24

== Medal summary ==
=== Men's events ===
Event	Gold	Silver	Bronze
Individual Foil	(Italy) Andrea Borella	(Cuba) Tulio Díaz	(Italy) Mauro Numa
Team Foil	Italy	West Germany	East Germany
Individual Sabre	(Soviet Union) Sergey Mindirgasov	(Hungarian People's Republic) Imre Bujdosó	(People's Republic of Bulgaria) Vasil Etropolski
Team Sabre	Soviet Union	(Polish People's Republic) Poland	(People's Republic of Bulgaria) Bulgaria
Individual Épée	(France) Philippe Riboud	(Socialist Republic of Romania) Mikloş-Gabor Bodoczi	(France) Olivier Lenglet
Team Épée	West Germany	Soviet Union	Italy

=== Women's events ===
Event	Gold	Silver	Bronze
Individual Foil	(West Germany) Anja Fichtel	(West Germany) Sabine Bau	(Soviet Union) Olga Voshchakina
Team Foil	Soviet Union	Italy	West Germany
