= 1987 World Fencing Championships =

International fencing competition

1987 World Championships in Fencing
- Host city: Lausanne, Switzerland

The 1987 World Fencing Championships were held in Lausanne, Switzerland.

== Medal table ==
Rank	Nation	Gold	Silver	Bronze	Total
1	West Germany (FRG)	3	3	0	6
2	Soviet Union (URS)	2	1	0	3
3	France (FRA)	1	1	2	4
4	Hungary (HUN)	1	1	1	3
5	Romania (ROU)	1	1	0	2
6	Bulgaria (BUL)	0	1	0	1
7	Italy (ITA)	0	0	2	2
8	China (CHN)	0	0	1	1
8	Cuba (CUB)	0	0	1	1
8	Poland (POL)	0	0	1	1
Totals (10 entries)		8	8	8	24

== Medal summary ==
=== Men's events ===
Event	Gold	Silver	Bronze
Individual Foil	(West Germany) Matthias Gey	(West Germany) Matthias Behr	(Italy) Federico Cervi
Team Foil	West Germany	France	(Hungarian People's Republic) Hungary
Individual Sabre	(France) Jean-François Lamour	(Hungarian People's Republic) György Nébald	(Poland) Robert Kościelniakowski
Team Sabre	Soviet Union	Bulgaria	France
Individual Épée	(West Germany) Volker Fischer	(Soviet Union) Andrey Shuvalov	(Cuba) Wilfredo Loyola-Torriente
Team Épée	Soviet Union	West Germany	France

=== Women's events ===
Event	Gold	Silver	Bronze
Individual Foil	(Socialist Republic of Romania) Elisabeta Guzganu-Tufan	(West Germany) Zita-Eva Funkenhauser	(China) Jujie Luan
Team Foil	(Hungarian People's Republic) Hungary	(Socialist Republic of Romania) Romania	Italy
