= Andrzej Kostrzewa =

Polish fencer

Personal information
- Born: 31 July 1958 (age 67) Wolina, Poland

Sport
- Sport: Fencing

Andrzej Piotr Kostrzewa (born 31 July 1958) is a Polish fencer. He competed at the 1980 and 1988 Summer Olympics.
