= 1983 World Fencing Championships =

International fencing competition

1983 World Championships in Fencing
- Host city: Vienna, Austria

The 1983 World Fencing Championships were held in Vienna, Austria. The event took place from July 20 to July 30, 1983.

== Medal table ==
Rank	Nation	Gold	Silver	Bronze	Total
1	West Germany (FRG)	2	3	0	5
2	Italy (ITA)	2	2	3	7
3	Soviet Union (URS)	2	0	0	2
4	Bulgaria (BUL)	1	0	1	2
5	France (FRA)	1	0	0	1
6	Hungary (HUN)	0	1	1	2
7	East Germany (GDR)	0	1	0	1
7	Switzerland (SUI)	0	1	0	1
9	China (CHN)	0	0	1	1
9	Cuba (CUB)	0	0	1	1
9	Poland (POL)	0	0	1	1
Totals (11 entries)		8	8	8	24

== Medal summary ==
=== Men's events ===
Event	Gold	Silver	Bronze
Individual Foil	(Soviet Union) Alexandr Romankov	(West Germany) Matthias Gey	(Polish People's Republic) Marian Sypniewski
Team Foil	West Germany	East Germany	Cuba
Individual Sabre	(People's Republic of Bulgaria) Vasil Etropolski	(Italy) Gianfranco Dalla Barba	(People's Republic of Bulgaria) Khristo Etropolski
Team Sabre	Soviet Union	(Hungarian People's Republic) Hungary	Italy
Individual Épée	(West Germany) Elmar Borrmann	(Switzerland) Daniel Giger	(Italy) Angelo Mazzoni
Team Épée	France	West Germany	Italy

=== Women's events ===
Event	Gold	Silver	Bronze
Individual Foil	(Italy) Dorina Vaccaroni	(Italy) Carola Cicconetti	(China) Jujie Luan
Team Foil	Italy	West Germany	(Hungarian People's Republic) Hungary
