= 1985 World Fencing Championships =

International fencing competition

1985 World Championships in Fencing
- Host city: Barcelona, Spain

The 1985 World Fencing Championships were held in Barcelona, Catalonia, Spain.

== Medal table ==
Rank	Nation	Gold	Silver	Bronze	Total
1	West Germany (FRG)	3	2	1	6
2	Italy (ITA)	2	2	1	5
3	Hungary (HUN)	1	1	1	3
4	Soviet Union (URS)	1	0	3	4
5	France (FRA)	1	0	1	2
6	Bulgaria (BUL)	0	2	1	3
7	Czechoslovakia (TCH)	0	1	0	1
Totals (7 entries)		8	8	8	24

== Medal summary ==
=== Men's events ===
Event	Gold	Silver	Bronze
Individual Foil	(Italy) Mauro Numa	(Italy) Andrea Cipressa	(West Germany) Harald Hein
Team Foil	Italy	West Germany	Soviet Union
Individual Sabre	(Hungarian People's Republic) György Nébald	(People's Republic of Bulgaria) Khristo Etropolski	(People's Republic of Bulgaria) Vasil Etropolski
Team Sabre	Soviet Union	(People's Republic of Bulgaria) Bulgaria	(Hungarian People's Republic) Hungary
Individual Épée	(France) Philippe Boisse	(Czechoslovakia) Jaroslav Jurka	(France) Philippe Riboud
Team Épée	West Germany	Italy	Soviet Union

=== Women's events ===
Event	Gold	Silver	Bronze
Individual Foil	(West Germany) Cornelia Hanisch	(West Germany) Sabine Bischoff	(Italy) Anna Rita Sparaciari
Team Foil	West Germany	(Hungarian People's Republic) Hungary	Soviet Union
