= 1974 World Fencing Championships =

International fencing competition

1974 World Championships in Fencing
- Host city: Grenoble, France

The 1974 World Fencing Championships were held in Grenoble, France.

== Medal table ==
* Host nation (France)

Rank	Nation	Gold	Silver	Bronze	Total
1	Soviet Union (URS)	4	1	3	8
2	Sweden (SWE)	2	0	0	2
3	Hungary (HUN)	1	2	1	4
4	Italy (ITA)	1	1	1	3
5	France (FRA)*	0	1	2	3
6	Romania (ROU)	0	1	1	2
7	Poland (POL)	0	1	0	1
7	West Germany (FRG)	0	1	0	1
Totals (8 entries)		8	8	8	24

== Medal summary ==
=== Men's events ===
Event	Gold	Silver	Bronze
Individual Foil	(Soviet Union) Alexandr Romankov	(Italy) Carlo Montano	(France) Frédéric Pietruszka
Team Foil	Soviet Union	(Polish People's Republic) Poland	France
Individual Sabre	(Italy) Mario Aldo Montano	(Soviet Union) Viktor Krovopuskov	(Soviet Union) Viktor Sidyak
Team Sabre	Soviet Union	(Socialist Republic of Romania) Romania	Italy
Individual Épée	(Sweden) Rolf Edling	(France) Jacques Brodin	(Soviet Union) Boris Lukomsky
Team Épée	Sweden	West Germany	(Hungarian People's Republic) Hungary

=== Women's events ===
Event	Gold	Silver	Bronze
Individual Foil	(Hungarian People's Republic) Ildikó Farkasinszky-Bóbis	(Hungarian People's Republic) Ildikó Schwarczenberger	(Soviet Union) Nailya Gilyazova
Team Foil	Soviet Union	(Hungarian People's Republic) Hungary	(Socialist Republic of Romania) Romania
