= Viktor Krovopuskov =

Soviet fencer (born 1948)

Personal information
- Born: 29 September 1948 (age 78) Moscow, Russian SFSR, Soviet Union

Sport
- Sport: Fencing
Medal record
Men's fencing
Representing Soviet Union
Olympic Games
Gold medal – first place	1976 Montreal	Team sabre
Gold medal – first place	1976 Montreal	Sabre individual
Gold medal – first place	1980 Moscow	Team sabre
Gold medal – first place	1980 Moscow	Sabre individual

Viktor Alekseyevich Krovopuskov (Russian: Ви́ктор Алексе́евич Кровопу́сков; born 29 September 1948 in Moscow) is a retired sabre fencer, who competed for the USSR.

Krovopuskov began fencing at age 13 at the Children and Youth Sport School in Moscow, his first trainer being Igor Chernyshev. In 1967, he joined the Armed Forces Sports Society in Moscow. He was a member of the USSR National Team between 1973 and 1986. At the 1976 Olympics he won gold medals in both the individual and team sabre events. He repeated his performance at the 1980 Summer Olympics, where he, again, won gold medals in both events.

Krovopuskov was world champion in individual sabre twice (1978 and 1982), and team sabre five times (1974, 1975, 1979, 1983, and 1985). He also won the World Cup in sabre twice (1976 and 1979). In 1979, he was named the Best Sabre Fencer of the World by the International Fencing Federation.

He was awarded the Order of the Red Banner of Labour in 1976 and the Order of Lenin in 1980.

== Bibliography ==
- V. L. Golubev (1981). Viktor Krovopuskov. Heroes of the Olympic Games (in Russian). Moscow: Fizkultura i sport.
