= 1979 World Fencing Championships =

International fencing competition

1979 World Championships in Fencing
- Host city: Melbourne, Australia

The 1979 World Fencing Championships were held in Melbourne, Australia.

== Medal table ==
Rank	Nation	Gold	Silver	Bronze	Total
1	Soviet Union (URS)	6	2	1	9
2	West Germany (FRG)	1	1	2	4
3	France (FRA)	1	1	0	2
4	Hungary (HUN)	0	2	1	3
4	Italy (ITA)	0	2	1	3
6	Poland (POL)	0	0	2	2
7	Switzerland (SUI)	0	0	1	1
Totals (7 entries)		8	8	8	24

== Medal summary ==
=== Men's events ===
Event	Gold	Silver	Bronze
Individual Foil	(Soviet Union) Alexandr Romankov	(France) Pascal Jolyot	(Italy) Fabio Dal Zotto
Team Foil	Soviet Union	Italy	West Germany
Individual Sabre	(Soviet Union) Vladimir Nazlymov	(Soviet Union) Viktor Krovopuskov	(Soviet Union) Mikhail Burtsev
Team Sabre	Soviet Union	Italy	(Polish People's Republic) Poland
Individual Épée	(France) Philippe Riboud	(Hungarian People's Republic) Ernő Kolczonay	(Polish People's Republic) Leszek Swornowski
Team Épée	Soviet Union	West Germany	Switzerland

=== Women's events ===
Event	Gold	Silver	Bronze
Individual Foil	(West Germany) Cornelia Hanisch	(Soviet Union) Valentina Sidorova	(Hungarian People's Republic) Ildikó Schwarczenberger
Team Foil	Soviet Union	(Hungarian People's Republic) Hungary	West Germany
