= 1975 World Fencing Championships =

International fencing competition

1975 World Championships in Fencing
- Host city: (Hungarian People's Republic) Budapest, Hungary

The 1975 World Fencing Championships were held in Budapest, Hungary.

== Medal table ==
* Host nation (Hungary)

Rank	Nation	Gold	Silver	Bronze	Total
1	Soviet Union (URS)	3	3	1	7
2	France (FRA)	2	1	0	3
3	West Germany (FRG)	1	1	0	2
4	Romania (ROU)	1	0	2	3
5	Sweden (SWE)	1	0	0	1
6	Hungary (HUN)*	0	2	4	6
7	Poland (POL)	0	1	0	1
8	Italy (ITA)	0	0	1	1
Totals (8 entries)		8	8	8	24

== Medal summary ==
=== Men's events ===
Event	Gold	Silver	Bronze
Individual Foil	(France) Christian Noël	(France) Bernard Talvard	(Soviet Union) Vladimir Denisov
Team Foil	France	Soviet Union	Italy
Individual Sabre	(Soviet Union) Vladimir Nazlymov	(Polish People's Republic) Jacek Bierkowski	(Hungarian People's Republic) Péter Marót
Team Sabre	Soviet Union	(Hungarian People's Republic) Hungary	(Socialist Republic of Romania) Romania
Individual Épée	(West Germany) Alexander Pusch	(Soviet Union) Boris Lukomsky	(Hungarian People's Republic) István Osztrics
Team Épée	Sweden	West Germany	(Hungarian People's Republic) Hungary

=== Women's events ===
Event	Gold	Silver	Bronze
Individual Foil	(Socialist Republic of Romania) Ecaterina Stahl-Iencic	(Soviet Union) Olga Knyazeva	(Hungarian People's Republic) Ildikó Farkasinszky-Bóbis
Team Foil	Soviet Union	(Hungarian People's Republic) Hungary	(Socialist Republic of Romania) Romania
