= 1978 World Fencing Championships =

International fencing competition

1978 World Championships in Fencing
- Host city: Hamburg, West Germany

The 1978 World Fencing Championships were held in Hamburg, West Germany. The event took place from July 12 to July 22, 1978, and was held at Alsterdorfer Sporthalle.

== Medal table ==
* Host nation (West Germany)

Rank	Nation	Gold	Silver	Bronze	Total
1	Soviet Union (URS)	3	4	1	8
2	Hungary (HUN)	2	0	0	2
3	France (FRA)	1	2	0	3
4	Poland (POL)	1	1	0	2
5	West Germany (FRG)*	1	0	2	3
6	Czechoslovakia (TCH)	0	1	0	1
7	Italy (ITA)	0	0	2	2
7	Sweden (SWE)	0	0	2	2
9	Romania (ROM)	0	0	1	1
Totals (9 entries)		8	8	8	24

== Medal summary ==
=== Men's events ===
Event	Gold	Silver	Bronze
Individual Foil	(France) Didier Flament	(Soviet Union) Alexandr Romankov	(West Germany) Harald Hein
Team Foil	(Polish People's Republic) Poland	France	Soviet Union
Individual Sabre	(Soviet Union) Viktor Krovopuskov	(Soviet Union) Mikhail Burtsev	(Italy) Michele Maffei
Team Sabre	(Hungarian People's Republic) Hungary	Soviet Union	Italy
Individual Épée	(West Germany) Alexander Pusch	(France) Philippe Riboud	(Sweden) Hans Jacobson
Team Épée	(Hungarian People's Republic) Hungary	Soviet Union	Sweden

=== Women's events ===
Event	Gold	Silver	Bronze
Individual Foil	(Soviet Union) Valentina Sidorova	(Czechoslovakia) Katarína Lokšová-Ráczová	(West Germany) Cornelia Hanisch
Team Foil	Soviet Union	(Polish People's Republic) Poland	(Socialist Republic of Romania) Romania
