= 1979 Summer Universiade =

Multi-sport event in Mexico City, Mexico

X Summer Universiade X Universiadas de Verano
- Host city: Mexico City, Mexico
- Nations: 94
- Athletes: 2,974
- Events: 95 in 10 sports
- Opening: September 2, 1979
- Closing: September 13, 1979
- Opened by: José López Portillo
- Torch lighter: Ana Maria Orendain
- Main venue: Estadio Olimpico Universitario

The 1979 Summer Universiade, also known as the X Summer Universiade, took place in Mexico City, Mexico from 2 to 13 September.

== Sports ==
- Athletics (37)
- Basketball (2)
- Diving (4)
- Fencing (8)
- Football (1)
- Gymnastics (14)
- Swimming (26)
- Tennis (5)
- Volleyball (2)
- Water polo (1)

== Medal table ==
* Host nation (Mexico)

Rank	Nation	Gold	Silver	Bronze	Total
1	Soviet Union (URS)	33	29	14	76
2	United States (USA)	21	14	16	51
3	Romania (ROU)	13	3	14	30
4	East Germany (GDR)	6	4	4	14
5	West Germany (FRG)	4	6	7	17
6	Hungary (HUN)	4	3	3	10
7	Italy (ITA)	3	2	5	10
8	Netherlands (NED)	2	4	3	9
9	Poland (POL)	2	3	3	8
10	Czechoslovakia (TCH)	2	0	3	5
11	Great Britain (GBR)	1	6	4	11
12	Japan (JPN)	1	3	6	10
13	Mexico (MEX)*	1	2	1	4
14	Brazil (BRA)	1	2	0	3
15	China (CHN)	1	1	4	6
16	France (FRA)	1	1	3	5
17	South Korea (KOR)	1	1	0	2
18	Australia (AUS)	1	0	1	2
19	Austria (AUT)	1	0	0	1
20	Cuba (CUB)	0	3	3	6
21	Finland (FIN)	0	3	0	3
22	Bulgaria (BUL)	0	1	1	2
22	Yugoslavia (YUG)	0	1	1	2
24	India (IND)	0	1	0	1
24	Ivory Coast (CIV)	0	1	0	1
24	Switzerland (SUI)	0	1	0	1
24	Uruguay (URU)	0	1	0	1
28	Canada (CAN)	0	0	3	3
29	Kenya (KEN)	0	0	1	1
Totals (29 entries)		99	96	100	295
