= 1981 World Fencing Championships =

International fencing competition

1981 World Championships in Fencing
- Host city: Clermont-Ferrand, France

The 1981 World Fencing Championships were held in Clermont-Ferrand, France. The event was held between July 2-13, 1981.

== Medal table ==
Rank	Nation	Gold	Silver	Bronze	Total
1	Soviet Union (URS)	4	2	0	6
2	Hungary (HUN)	2	1	2	5
3	West Germany (FRG)	1	1	2	4
4	Poland (POL)	1	0	1	2
5	Italy (ITA)	0	1	3	4
6	China (CHN)	0	1	0	1
6	Romania (ROU)	0	1	0	1
6	Switzerland (SUI)	0	1	0	1
Totals (8 entries)		8	8	8	24

== Medal summary ==
=== Men's events ===
Event	Gold	Silver	Bronze
Individual Foil	(Soviet Union) Vladimir Smirnov	(Socialist Republic of Romania) Petru Kuki	(Italy) Angelo Scuri
Team Foil	Soviet Union	Italy	West Germany
Individual Sabre	(Polish People's Republic) Dariusz Wódke	(Hungarian People's Republic) Imre Gedővári	(Italy) Michele Maffei
Team Sabre	(Hungarian People's Republic) Hungary	Soviet Union	(Polish People's Republic) Poland
Individual Épée	(Hungarian People's Republic) Zoltán Székely	(Soviet Union) Aleksandr Mozhayev	(West Germany) Elmar Borrmann
Team Épée	Soviet Union	Switzerland	(Hungarian People's Republic) Hungary

=== Women's events ===
Event	Gold	Silver	Bronze
Individual Foil	(West Germany) Cornelia Hanisch	(China) Jujie Luan	(Italy) Dorina Vaccaroni
Team Foil	Soviet Union	West Germany	(Hungarian People's Republic) Hungary
