= World Fencing Championships =

International fencing competition

- Status: Active
- Frequency: Annual
- Inaugurated: 1921 Paris
- Most recent: 2026 Hong Kong
- Next event: 2027
- Organiser: International Fencing Federation
- Website: fie.org
- 2025 World Fencing Championships

The World Fencing Championships (also known as Senior Fencing World Championships) is an annual competition in fencing organized by the International Fencing Federation. Contestants may participate in foil, épée, and sabre events.

== History ==
The FIE first organized an international fencing championship in Paris, France in 1921. The competition in its early years was named the European Championships (Championnats d'Europe), and the initial participants were members of the fencing federations of the FIE. In 1921, the only event was men's épée individual. In 1922 and 1923, men's sabre individual was also held. In 1925, only men's sabre individual was held. Since 1926, men's individual events have been held in all three weapons: épée, foil, and sabre. In 1929, women's foil was added to the program as well as a men's foil team event. Men's épée and sabre teams were added in 1930 and women's foil team in 1932. Women's épée individual and team events were added in 1988, and women's sabre individual and team in 1999.

After the 1936 Olympics, the government of Benito Mussolini in Italy offered national recognition and privileges to winners of Olympic or world titles, but not European titles. The Italian fencing federation requested that the FIE change the name of the European Championships to World Championships (Championnats du Monde). The FIE approved this request and gave retroactive World Championship status to the previous European Championships.

Since 1921, the FIE championships have occurred annually except for an interruption forced by World War II from 1939 to 1946, and in some of the years when the Summer Olympics are held. The fencing competitions at the Summer Olympics have served as the World Championships of the year for the relevant events. Since 1932, World Championships have been held during the Olympic years only for those events not being held during that year's Summer Olympics. For the years 1932, 1936, 1948, 1952, and 1956, World Championships were held only in Women's Foil Team since that event was not on the Olympic program during those years. After this event was added to the Olympic program beginning with the 1960 Olympics, the FIE stopped holding World Championships during the Olympic years until 1988 when women's épée individual and women's épée team events were added to the World Championship program, but the IOC declined to add these events to the Olympic program. A World Championship in these two events was again held in 1992 for the same reason. Finally, in 1996 the IOC added these two events to the Olympic program, and the FIE again stopped holding a World Championship in an Olympic year.

When the FIE added women's sabre to the World Championships in 1999, the IOC refused to add these two events to the 2000 Olympic program and so the FIE held a World Championships in only women's sabre in 2000. For the 2004 Olympics, the IOC allowed women's sabre to be contested at the Olympics but only under the condition that the number of fencing events being contested (individual and team) remain at ten. The FIE reluctantly agreed to this condition, and has satisfied it by not contesting two of the team events at the Olympics but holding World Championships for them instead during those years. So World Championships have been held but Olympic events have not been held (2004–16) for the following events:

- 2004 – women's foil team, women's sabre team
- 2008 – men's foil team, women's épée team
- 2012 – men's épée team, women's sabre team
- 2016 – men's sabre team, women's foil team

From 2020 Summer Olympics, all 12 fencing events were held, which means no World Championships are held on Olympic years.

=== Naming ===
These World Fencing Championships are usually referred to as Senior World Fencing Championships because the FIE also runs three other World Championships. Beginning in 1950, the FIE also sanctioned an annual competitions which it originally called the Junior World Criterium (Criterium Mondial des Jeunes). Entries were originally restricted to those 21 years of age or lower, but in 1960 the age limit was dropped to 20. In 1964, the name of the competition was officially changed to Junior World Championships, and world championship status was retroactively granted to the participants of the previous competitions.

Beginning in 1987, the FIE began sanctioning an annual competition called the Cadet World Championships. Entries were restricted to those 17 years of age or lower. Originally the Junior and Cadet World Championships were held in different cities on different dates, but beginning in 1993 they've been called the Junior/Cadet World Championships and have been held at the same venue with all of the cadet events held first followed by all of the junior events.

Beginning in 1997, the FIE began sanctioning an annual competition called the Veteran World Championships. Entries were restricted to those 40 years of age or older the first year, and 50 years or older in subsequent years.

== Editions ==
Edition	Year	Host City	Country	Events
International Fencing Championships
1	1921	Paris	France	1
2	1922	Paris Ostend	France Belgium	1 1
3	1923	The Hague	Netherlands	2
4	1925	Ostend	Belgium	1
5	1926	Budapest Ostend	Hungary Belgium	2 1
6	1927	Vichy	France	3
7	1929	Naples	Italy	5
8	1930	Liège	Belgium	7
9	1931	Vienna	Austria	7
10	1932	Copenhagen	Denmark	1
11	1933	Budapest	Hungary	8
12	1934	Warsaw	Poland	8
13	1935	Lausanne	Switzerland	8
14	1936	San Remo	Italy	1
World Fencing Championships
1	1937	Paris	France	8
2	1938	Piešťany	Czechoslovakia	7
3	1947	Lisbon	Portugal	8
4	1948	The Hague	Netherlands	1
5	1949	Cairo	Egypt	7
6	1950	Monte Carlo	Monaco	8
7	1951	Stockholm	Sweden	8
8	1952	Copenhagen	Denmark	1
9	1953	Brussels	Belgium	8
10	1954	Luxembourg	Luxembourg	8
11	1955	Rome	Italy	8
12	1956	London	Great Britain	1
13	1957	Paris	France	8
14	1958	Philadelphia	United States	8
15	1959	Budapest	Hungary	8
16	1961	Turin	Italy	8
17	1962	Buenos Aires	Argentina	8
18	1963	Gdańsk	Poland	8
19	1965	Paris	France	8
20	1966	Moscow	Soviet Union	8
21	1967	Montreal	Canada	8
22	1969	Havana	Cuba	8
23	1970	Ankara	Turkey	8
24	1971	Vienna	Austria	8
25	1973	Gothenburg	Sweden	8
26	1974	Grenoble	France	8
27	1975	Budapest	Hungary	8

Edition	Year	Host City	Country	Events
28	1977	Buenos Aires	Argentina	8
29	1978	Hamburg	West Germany	8
30	1979	Melbourne	Australia	8
31	1981	Clermont-Ferrand	France	8
32	1982	Rome	Italy	8
33	1983	Vienna	Austria	8
34	1985	Barcelona	Spain	8
35	1986	Sofia	Bulgaria	8
36	1987	Lausanne	Switzerland	8
37	1988	Orléans	France	2
38	1989	Denver	United States	10
39	1990	Lyon	France	10
40	1991	Budapest	Hungary	10
41	1992	Havana	Cuba	2
42	1993	Essen	Germany	10
43	1994	Athens	Greece	10
44	1995	The Hague	Netherlands	10
45	1997	Cape Town	South Africa	10
46	1998	La Chaux-de-Fonds	Switzerland	10
47	1999	Seoul	South Korea	12
48	2000	Budapest	Hungary	2
49	2001	Nîmes	France	12
50	2002	Lisbon	Portugal	12
51	2003	Havana	Cuba	12
52	2004	New York City	United States	2
53	2005	Leipzig	Germany	12
54	2006	Turin	Italy	12
55	2007	Saint Petersburg	Russia	12
56	2008	Beijing	China	2
57	2009	Antalya	Turkey	12
58	2010	Paris	France	12
59	2011	Catania	Italy	12
60	2012	Kyiv	Ukraine	2
61	2013	Budapest	Hungary	12
62	2014	Kazan	Russia	12
63	2015	Moscow	Russia	12
64	2016	Rio de Janeiro	Brazil	2
65	2017	Leipzig	Germany	12
66	2018	Wuxi	China	12
67	2019	Budapest	Hungary	12
68	2022	Cairo	Egypt	12
69	2023	Milan	Italy	12
70	2025	Tbilisi	Georgia	12
71	2026	Hong Kong	Hong Kong	12
72	2027	Tehran	Iran	12

== Hosting tally ==
Hosting nations 1921–2026

Times hosted	Host country
12	France
8	Hungary, Italy
5	Belgium
3	Austria, Cuba, Germany, Netherlands, Russia, Switzerland, United States
2	Argentina, China, Denmark, Egypt, Poland, Portugal, Sweden, Turkey
1	Australia, Brazil, Bulgaria, Canada, Czechoslovakia, Georgia, Great Britain, Greece, Hong Kong, Luxembourg, Monaco, South Africa, South Korea, Ukraine, Spain, Soviet Union, West Germany

== Medal table ==
This table has been last updated after the 2026 World Fencing Championships. This counts the medals from the World Championships since 1921, and does not include the results of the fencing competitions at the Summer Olympics.

Rank	Nation	Gold	Silver	Bronze	Total
1	Italy	128	116	141	385
2	France	100	102	101	303
3	Hungary	97	90	100	287
4	Soviet Union	92	54	47	193
5	Russia	57	32	36	125
6	West Germany	25	26	16	67
7	Germany	23	35	45	103
8	Poland	18	30	43	91
9	United States	14	18	19	51
10	Romania	13	22	35	70
11	Ukraine	13	13	23	49
12	South Korea	12	15	30	57
13	China	8	21	19	48
14	Sweden	7	15	21	43
15	Cuba	6	5	9	20
16	Japan	6	2	13	21
17	Estonia	5	8	7	20
18	Denmark	5	3	4	12
19	Austria	4	4	9	17
20	Switzerland	3	9	13	25
21	Great Britain	3	6	9	18
22	Netherlands	3	3	6	12
23	Belgium	2	4	11	17
24	Spain	2	2	7	11
25	Azerbaijan	2	2	4	8
26	Bulgaria	1	3	5	9
27	Czechoslovakia	1	3	1	5
–	Individual Neutral Athletes (Note: At the 2025 World Championships, in accordance with sanctions imposed following by the 2022 Russian invasion of Ukraine, fencers from Russia were not permitted to use the name, flag, or anthem of Russia. They instead participated as "Individual Neutral Athletes (AIN)", their medals were not included in the official medal table.)	1	2	0	3
28	Hong Kong	1	1	4	6
29	Georgia	1	1	1	3
30	Kazakhstan	1	0	2	3
31	Norway	1	0	1	2
32	Brazil	1	0	0	1
32	Czech Republic	1	0	0	1
34	Venezuela	0	2	1	3
35	Greece	0	1	3	4
35	Tunisia	0	1	3	4
37	Belarus	0	1	2	3
37	Canada	0	1	2	3
37	East Germany	0	1	2	3
40	Portugal	0	1	0	1
41	Egypt	0	0	11	11
42	CIS	0	0	1	1
42	Colombia	0	0	1	1
42	Finland	0	0	1	1
42	Iran	0	0	1	1
42	Saudi Arabia	0	0	1	1
Totals (46 entries)		657	655	811	2,123

== World champions ==
=== Épée ===
Year	Men's individual	Women's individual	Men's team	Women's team
1921	(France) Lucien Gaudin			
1922	(Norway) Raoul Heide			
1923	(Netherlands) Wouter Brouwer			
1926	(France) Georges Tainturier			
1927	(France) Georges Buchard			
1929	(France) Philippe Cattiau			
1930	(France) Philippe Cattiau		Belgium	
1931	(France) Georges Buchard		Italy	
1933	(France) Georges Buchard		Italy	
1934	(Hungary) Pál Dunay		France	
1935	(Sweden) Hans Drakenberg		France	
1937	(France) Bernard Schmetz		Italy	
1938	(France) Michel Pécheux		France	
1939–1946	did not take place due to World War II			
1947	(France) Édouard Artigas		France	
1949	(Italy) Dario Mangiarotti		Italy	
1950	(Denmark) Mogens Lüchow		Italy	
1951	(Italy) Edoardo Mangiarotti		France	
1953	(Hungary) József Sákovics		Italy	
1954	(Italy) Edoardo Mangiarotti		Italy	
1955	(Italy) Giorgio Anglesio		Italy	
1957	(France) Armand Mouyal		Italy	
1958	(United Kingdom) Bill Hoskyns		Italy	
1959	(Soviet Union) Bruno Habārovs		Hungary	
1961	(France) Jack Guittet		Soviet Union	
1962	(Hungary) István Kausz		France	
1963	(Austria) Roland Losert		Poland	
1965	(Hungary) Zoltán Nemere		France	
1966	(Soviet Union) Aleksey Nikanchikov		France	
1967	(Soviet Union) Aleksey Nikanchikov		Soviet Union	
1969	(Poland) Bohdan Andrzejewski		Soviet Union	
1970	(Soviet Union) Aleksey Nikanchikov		Hungary	
1971	(Soviet Union) Grigory Kriss		Hungary	
1973	(Sweden) Rolf Edling		West Germany	
1974	(Sweden) Rolf Edling		Sweden	
1975	(Germany) Alexander Pusch		Sweden	
1977	(Sweden) Johan Harmenberg		Sweden	
1978	(Germany) Alexander Pusch		Hungary	
1979	(France) Philippe Riboud		Soviet Union	
1981	(Hungary) Zoltán Székely		Soviet Union	
1982	(Hungary) Jenő Pap		France	
1983	(Germany) Elmar Borrmann		France	
1985	(France) Philippe Boisse		West Germany	
1986	(France) Philippe Riboud		West Germany	
1987	(Germany) Volker Fischer		Soviet Union	
1988	event not held	(France) Brigitte Benon	event not held	West Germany
1989	(Spain) Manuel Pereira	(Switzerland) Anja Straub	Italy	Hungary
1990	(Germany) Thomas Gerull	(Cuba) Taymi Chappé	Italy	West Germany
1991	(Soviet Union) Andrey Shuvalov	(Hungary) Mariann Horváth	Soviet Union	Hungary
1992	event not held	(Hungary) Mariann Horváth	event not held	Hungary
1993	(Russia) Pavel Kolobkov	(Estonia) Oksana Jermakova	Italy	Hungary
1994	(Russia) Pavel Kolobkov	(Italy) Laura Chiesa	France	Spain
1995	(France) Éric Srecki	(Poland) Joanna Jakimiuk	Germany	Hungary
1997	(France) Éric Srecki	(Cuba) Mirayda García	Cuba	Hungary
1998	(France) Hugues Obry	(France) Laura Flessel-Colovic	Hungary	France
1999	(Germany) Arnd Schmitt	(France) Laura Flessel-Colovic	France	Hungary
2001	(Italy) Paolo Milanoli	(Germany) Claudia Bokel	Hungary	Russia
2002	(Russia) Pavel Kolobkov	(South Korea) Hyun Hee	France	Hungary
2003	(France) Fabrice Jeannet	(Ukraine) Natalia Konrad	Russia	Russia
2005	(Russia) Pavel Kolobkov	(Poland) Danuta Dmowska	France	France
2006	(China) Wang Lei	(Hungary) Tímea Nagy	France	China
2007	(Hungary) Krisztián Kulcsár	(Germany) Britta Heidemann	France	France
2008	events not held			France
2009	(Russia) Anton Avdeyev	(Russia) Lyubov Shutova	France	Italy
2010	(Estonia) Nikolai Novosjolov	(France) Maureen Nisima	France	Romania
2011	(Italy) Paolo Pizzo	(China) Li Na	France	Romania
2012	events not held		United States	event not held
2013	(Estonia) Nikolai Novosjolov	(Estonia) Julia Beljajeva	Hungary	Russia
2014	(France) Ulrich Robeiri	(Italy) Rossella Fiamingo	France	Russia
2015	(Hungary) Géza Imre	(Italy) Rossella Fiamingo	Ukraine	China
2017	(Italy) Paolo Pizzo	(Russia) Tatyana Gudkova	France	Estonia
2018	(France) Yannick Borel	(Italy) Mara Navarria	Switzerland	United States
2019	(Hungary) Gergely Siklósi	(Brazil) Nathalie Moellhausen	France	China
2022	(France) Romain Cannone	(South Korea) Song Se-ra	France	South Korea
2023	(Hungary) Máté Tamás Koch	(France) Marie-Florence Candassamy	Italy	Poland
2025	(Japan) Koki Kano	(Ukraine) Vlada Kharkova	Japan	France
2026	(Switzerland) Lucas Malcotti	(South Korea) Song Se-ra	Kazakhstan	Italy

=== Foil ===
Year	Men's individual	Women's individual	Men's team	Women's team
1926	(Italy) Giorgio Chiavacci			
1927	(Italy) Oreste Puliti			
1929	(Italy) Oreste Puliti	(Germany) Helene Mayer	Italy	
1930	(Italy) Giulio Gaudini	(Belgium) Jenny Addams	Italy	
1931	(France) René Lemoine	(Germany) Helene Mayer	Italy	
1932	events not held			Denmark
1933	(Italy) Gioacchino Guaragna	(United Kingdom) Gwendoline Neligan	Italy	Hungary
1934	(Italy) Giulio Gaudini	(Hungary) Ilona Elek	Italy	Hungary
1935	(France) André Gardère	(Hungary) Ilona Elek	Italy	Hungary
1936	events not held			Germany
1937	(Italy) Gustavo Marzi	(Nazi Germany) Helene Mayer	Italy	Hungary
1938	(Italy) Gioacchino Guaragna	(Czechoslovakia) Marie Šedivá	Italy	event not held
1939–1946	did not take place due to World War II			
1947	(France) Christian d'Oriola	(Austria) Ellen Müller-Preis	France	Denmark
1948	events not held			Denmark
1949	(France) Christian d'Oriola	(Austria) Ellen Müller-Preis	Italy	event not held
1950	(Italy) Renzo Nostini	(Austria) Ellen Müller-Preis & (France) Renée Garilhe	Italy	France
1951	(Italy) Manlio Di Rosa	(Hungary) Ilona Elek	France	France
1952	events not held			Hungary
1953	(France) Christian d'Oriola	(Italy) Irene Camber	France	Hungary
1954	(France) Christian d'Oriola	(Denmark) Karen Lachmann	Italy	Hungary
1955	(Hungary) József Gyuricza	(Hungary) Lídia Dömölky	Italy	Hungary
1956	events not held			Soviet Union
1957	(Hungary) Mihály Fülöp	(Soviet Union) Alexandra Zabelina	Hungary	Italy
1958	(Italy) Giancarlo Bergamini	(Soviet Union) Valentina Rastvorova	France	Soviet Union
1959	(United Kingdom) Allan Jay	(Soviet Union) Emma Yefimova	Soviet Union	Hungary
1961	(Poland) Ryszard Parulski	(Germany) Heidi Schmid	Soviet Union	Soviet Union
1962	(Soviet Union) German Sveshnikov	(Romania) Olga Szabó-Orbán	Soviet Union	Hungary
1963	(France) Jean-Claude Magnan	(Hungary) Ildikó Rejtő	Soviet Union	Soviet Union
1965	(France) Jean-Claude Magnan	(Soviet Union) Galina Gorokhova	Soviet Union	Soviet Union
1966	(Soviet Union) German Sveshnikov	(Soviet Union) Tatyana Samusenko	Soviet Union	Soviet Union
1967	(Soviet Union) Viktor Putyatin	(Soviet Union) Alexandra Zabelina	Romania	Hungary
1969	(West Germany) Friedrich Wessel	(Soviet Union) Elena Belova	Soviet Union	Romania
1970	(West Germany) Friedrich Wessel	(Soviet Union) Galina Gorokhova	Soviet Union	Soviet Union
1971	(Soviet Union) Vasyl Stankovych	(France) Marie-Chantal Demaille	France	Soviet Union
1973	(France) Christian Noël	(Soviet Union) Valentina Nikonova	Soviet Union	Hungary
1974	(Soviet Union) Alexandr Romankov	(Hungary) Ildikó Bóbis	Soviet Union	Soviet Union
1975	(France) Christian Noël	(Romania) Ecaterina Stahl	France	Soviet Union
1977	(Soviet Union) Alexandr Romankov	(Soviet Union) Valentina Sidorova	West Germany	Soviet Union
1978	(France) Didier Flament	(Soviet Union) Valentina Sidorova	Poland	Soviet Union
1979	(Soviet Union) Alexandr Romankov	(West Germany) Cornelia Hanisch	Soviet Union	Soviet Union
1981	(Soviet Union) Vladimir Smirnov	(Germany) Cornelia Hanisch	Soviet Union	Soviet Union
1982	(Soviet Union) Alexandr Romankov	(Soviet Union) Nailya Gilyazova	Soviet Union	Italy
1983	(Soviet Union) Alexandr Romankov	(Italy) Dorina Vaccaroni	West Germany	Italy
1985	(Italy) Mauro Numa	(West Germany) Cornelia Hanisch	Italy	West Germany
1986	(Italy) Andrea Borella	(West Germany) Anja Fichtel	Italy	Soviet Union
1987	(West Germany) Mathias Gey	(Romania) Elisabeta Tufan	West Germany	Hungary
1989	(West Germany) Alexander Koch	(Soviet Union) Olga Velichko	Soviet Union	West Germany
1990	(France) Philippe Omnès	(West Germany) Anja Fichtel	Italy	Italy
1991	(Germany) Ingo Weißenborn	(Italy) Giovanna Trillini	Cuba	Italy
1993	(Germany) Alexander Koch	(Italy) Francesca Bortolozzi	Germany	Germany
1994	(Cuba) Rolando Tucker	(Romania) Réka Szabó-Lăzar	Italy	Romania
1995	(Russia) Dmitriy Shevchenko	(Romania) Laura Badea	Cuba	Italy
1997	(Ukraine) Sergei Golubitsky	(Italy) Giovanna Trillini	France	Italy
1998	(Ukraine) Sergei Golubitsky	(Germany) Sabine Bau	Poland	Italy
1999	(Ukraine) Sergei Golubitsky	(Italy) Valentina Vezzali	France	Germany
2001	(Italy) Salvatore Sanzo	(Italy) Valentina Vezzali	France	Italy
2002	(Italy) Simone Vanni	(Russia) Svetlana Boyko	Germany	Russia
2003	(Germany) Peter Joppich	(Italy) Valentina Vezzali	Italy	Poland
2004	events not held			Italy
2005	(Italy) Salvatore Sanzo	(Italy) Valentina Vezzali	France	South Korea
2006	(Germany) Peter Joppich	(Italy) Margherita Granbassi	France	Russia
2007	(Germany) Peter Joppich	(Italy) Valentina Vezzali	France	Poland
2008	events not held		Italy	event not held
2009	(Italy) Andrea Baldini	(Russia) Aida Shanayeva	Italy	Italy
2010	(Germany) Peter Joppich	(Italy) Elisa Di Francisca	China	Italy
2011	(Italy) Andrea Cassarà	(Italy) Valentina Vezzali	China	Russia
2013	(United States) Miles Chamley-Watson	(Italy) Arianna Errigo	Italy	Italy
2014	(Russia) Aleksey Cheremisinov	(Italy) Arianna Errigo	France	Italy
2015	(Japan) Yūki Ōta	(Russia) Inna Deriglazova	Italy	Italy
2016	events not held			Russia
2017	(Russia) Dmitry Zherebchenko	(Russia) Inna Deriglazova	Italy	Italy
2018	(Italy) Alessio Foconi	(Italy) Alice Volpi	Italy	United States
2019	(France) Enzo Lefort	(Russia) Inna Deriglazova	United States	Russia
2022	(France) Enzo Lefort	(France) Ysaora Thibus	Italy	Italy
2023	(Italy) Tommaso Marini	(Italy) Alice Volpi	Japan	Italy
2025	(Hong Kong) Ryan Choi	(United States) Lee Kiefer	Italy	United States
2026	(Czech Republic) Alexander Choupenitch	(Italy) Martina Favaretto	Italy	Italy

=== Sabre ===
Year	Men's individual	Women's individual	Men's team	Women's team
1922	(Netherlands) Adrianus de Jong			
1923	(Netherlands) Adrianus de Jong			
1925	(Hungary) János Garay			
1926	(Hungary) Sándor Gombos			
1927	(Hungary) Sándor Gombos			
1929	(Hungary) Gyula Glykais			
1930	(Hungary) György Piller		Hungary	
1931	(Hungary) György Piller		Hungary	
1933	(Hungary) Endre Kabos		Hungary	
1934	(Hungary) Endre Kabos		Hungary	
1935	(Hungary) Aladár Gerevich		Hungary	
1937	(Hungary) Pál Kovács		Hungary	
1938	(Italy) Aldo Montano		Italy	
1939–1946	did not take place due to World War II			
1947	(Italy) Aldo Montano		Italy	
1949	(Italy) Gastone Darè		Italy	
1950	(France) Jean Levavasseur		Italy	
1951	(Hungary) Aladár Gerevich		Hungary	
1953	(Hungary) Pál Kovács		Hungary	
1954	(Hungary) Rudolf Kárpáti		Hungary	
1955	(Hungary) Aladár Gerevich		Hungary	
1957	(Poland) Jerzy Pawłowski		Hungary	
1958	(Soviet Union) Yakov Rylsky		Hungary	
1959	(Hungary) Rudolf Kárpáti		Poland	
1961	(Soviet Union) Yakov Rylsky		Poland	
1962	(Hungary) Zoltán Horváth		Poland	
1963	(Soviet Union) Yakov Rylsky		Poland	
1965	(Poland) Jerzy Pawłowski		Soviet Union	
1966	(Poland) Jerzy Pawłowski		Hungary	
1967	(Soviet Union) Mark Rakita		Soviet Union	
1969	(Soviet Union) Viktor Sidyak		Soviet Union	
1970	(Hungary) Tibor Pézsa		Soviet Union	
1971	(Italy) Michele Maffei		Soviet Union	
1973	(Italy) Mario Aldo Montano		Hungary	
1974	(Italy) Mario Aldo Montano		Soviet Union	
1975	(Soviet Union) Vladimir Nazlymov		Soviet Union	
1977	(Hungary) Pál Gerevich		Soviet Union	
1978	(Soviet Union) Viktor Krovopuskov		Hungary	
1979	(Soviet Union) Vladimir Nazlymov		Soviet Union	
1981	(Poland) Dariusz Wódke		Hungary	
1982	(Soviet Union) Viktor Krovopuskov		Hungary	
1983	(Bulgaria) Vasil Etropolski		Soviet Union	
1985	(Hungary) György Nébald		Soviet Union	
1986	(Soviet Union) Sergey Mindirgasov		Soviet Union	
1987	(France) Jean-François Lamour		Soviet Union	
1989	(Soviet Union) Grigory Kiriyenko		Soviet Union	
1990	(Hungary) György Nébald		Soviet Union	
1991	(Soviet Union) Grigory Kiriyenko		Hungary	
1993	(Russia) Grigory Kiriyenko		Hungary	
1994	(Germany) Felix Becker		Russia	
1995	(Russia) Grigory Kiriyenko		Italy	
1997	(Russia) Stanislav Pozdnyakov		France	
1998	(Italy) Luigi Tarantino		Hungary	
1999	(France) Damien Touya	(Azerbaijan) Yelena Jemayeva	France	Italy
2000	event not held	(Azerbaijan) Yelena Jemayeva	event not held	United States
2001	(Russia) Stanislav Pozdnyakov	(France) Anne-Lise Touya	Russia	Russia
2002	(Russia) Stanislav Pozdnyakov	(China) Tan Xue	Russia	Russia
2003	(Ukraine) Volodymyr Lukashenko	(Romania) Dorina Mihai	Russia	Italy
2004	events not held			Russia
2005	(Romania) Mihai Covaliu	(France) Anne-Lise Touya	Russia	United States
2006	(Russia) Stanislav Pozdnyakov	(United States) Rebecca Ward	France	France
2007	(Russia) Stanislav Pozdnyakov	(Russia) Yelena Nechayeva	Hungary	France
2008	events not held			
2009	(Germany) Nicolas Limbach	(United States) Mariel Zagunis	Romania	Ukraine
2010	(South Korea) Won Woo-young	(United States) Mariel Zagunis	Russia	Russia
2011	(Italy) Aldo Montano	(Russia) Sofya Velikaya	Russia	Russia
2012	events not held			Russia
2013	(Russia) Veniamin Reshetnikov	(Ukraine) Olha Kharlan	Russia	Ukraine
2014	(Russia) Nikolay Kovalev	(Ukraine) Olha Kharlan	Germany	United States
2015	(Russia) Aleksey Yakimenko	(Russia) Sofya Velikaya	Italy	Russia
2016	events not held		Russia	event not held
2017	(Hungary) András Szatmári	(Ukraine) Olha Kharlan	South Korea	Italy
2018	(South Korea) Kim Jung-hwan	(Russia) Sofia Pozdniakova	South Korea	France
2019	(South Korea) Oh Sang-uk	(Ukraine) Olha Kharlan	South Korea	Russia
2022	(Hungary) Áron Szilágyi	(Japan) Misaki Emura	South Korea	Hungary
2023	(United States) Eli Dershwitz	(Japan) Misaki Emura	Hungary	Hungary
2025	(Georgia (country)) Sandro Bazadze	Yana Egorian	Italy	France
2026	(Russia) Pavel Graudyn	(Germany) Larissa Eifler	France	Hungary

== Multiple gold medalists ==
Boldface denotes active fencers and highest medal count among all fencers (including these who not included in these tables) per type. The numbers in brackets denotes number of medals earned at the unofficial World Championships in 1921–1936 (known as European Championships back then) which are counted in overall statistics.

=== Men ===
==== All events ====
Rank	Fencer	Country	Weapon(s)	From	To	Gold	Silver	Bronze	Total
1	Aladár Gerevich	Hungary	Sabre & Foil	1931	1959	**14** (5)	2	3 (1)	19 (6)
2	Edoardo Mangiarotti	Italy	Épée & Foil	1937	1958	13	8	5	**26**
3	Stanislav Pozdnyakov	Russia	Sabre	1994	2007	10	5	2	17
4	Vladimir Nazlymov	Soviet Union	Sabre	1967	1979	10	3	2	15
5	Alexandr Romankov	Soviet Union	Foil	1974	1989	10	2	3	15
6	Pál Kovács	Hungary	Sabre	1933	1958	10 (1)	2	–	12 (1)
7	Gustavo Marzi	Italy	Foil & Sabre	1929	1938	9 (5)	**11 (10)**	1 (1)	21 **(16)**
8	German Sveshnikov	Soviet Union	Foil	1958	1969	9	2	1	12
9	Giulio Gaudini	Italy	Foil & Sabre	1929	1938	8 **(7)**	7 (7)	2 (2)	17 **(16)**
10	Christian d'Oriola	France	Foil	1947	1958	8	5	–	13

==== Individual events ====
Rank	Fencer	Country	Weapon	From	To	Gold	Silver	Bronze	Total
1	Stanislav Pozdnyakov	Russia	Sabre	1994	2007	**5**	3	–	8
2	Alexandr Romankov	Soviet Union	Foil	1974	1983	**5**	1	–	6
3	Pavel Kolobkov	Soviet Union; Russia	Épée	1989	2005	4	1	2	7
4	Christian d'Oriola	France	Foil	1947	1955	4	1	–	5
5	Peter Joppich	Germany	Foil	2003	2010	4	–	1	5
5	Grigory Kiriyenko	Soviet Union; Russia	Sabre	1989	1995	4	–	1	5
7	Jerzy Pawłowski	Poland	Sabre	1957	1971	3	4	1	8
8	Sergei Golubitsky	Ukraine	Foil	1993	1999	3	1	1	5
9	Aladár Gerevich	Hungary	Sabre	1935	1955	3 (1)	1	–	4 (1)
9	Aleksey Nikanchikov	Soviet Union	Épée	1966	1970	3	1	–	4

=== Women ===
==== All events ====
Rank	Fencer	Country	Weapon	From	To	Gold	Silver	Bronze	Total
1	Valentina Vezzali	Italy	Foil	1994	2016	**16**	6	4	**26**
2	**Arianna Errigo**	Italy	Foil	2009	2026	11	**8**	6	25
3	Ilona Elek	Hungary	Foil	1933	1956	11 **(5)**	5 (1)	2	18 **(6)**
4	Galina Gorokhova	Soviet Union	Foil	1958	1971	9	6	1	16
5	Alexandra Zabelina	Soviet Union	Foil	1956	1971	9	6	–	15
6	Giovanna Trillini	Italy	Foil	1986	2007	9	5	6	20
7	Valentina Sidorova (Burochkina)	Soviet Union	Foil	1973	1986	9	2	1	12
8	**Sofya Velikaya**	Russia	Sabre	2004	2019	8	5	3	16
9	Margit Elek	Hungary	Foil	1933	1956	8 (3)	4 (2)	1	13 (5)
10	Elena Belova (Novikova)	Soviet Union	Foil	1969	1979	8	4	–	12

==== Individual events ====
Rank	Fencer	Country	Weapon	From	To	Gold	Silver	Bronze	Total
1	Valentina Vezzali	Italy	Foil	1994	2014	**6**	2	4	**12**
2	**Olha Kharlan**	Ukraine	Sabre	2009	2019	4	2	1	7
3	Ilona Elek	Hungary	Foil	1934	1955	3 **(2)**	2	1	6 **(2)**
4	Ellen Müller-Preis	Austria	Foil	1931	1950	3	1 (1)	2 **(1)**	6 **(2)**
5	**Inna Deriglazova**	Russia	Foil	2013	2019	3	–	1	4
5	Cornelia Hanisch	West Germany	Foil	1978	1985	3	–	1	4
7	Helene Mayer	Germany	Foil	1929	1937	3 **(2)**	–	–	3 **(2)**
8	**Arianna Errigo**	Italy	Foil	2009	2026	2	**4**	**5**	11
9	**Sofya Velikaya**	Russia	Sabre	2005	2019	2	3	1	6
10	Mariel Zagunis	United States	Sabre	2006	2014	2	3	–	5

== See also ==
- Fencing at the Summer Olympics
- Junior World Fencing Championships
- Fencing World Cup

== Sources ==
- Cohen, Richard (2002). By the Sword. New York: Random House. ISBN 0-375-50417-6.
