= Women's fencing =

Fencing practiced by women

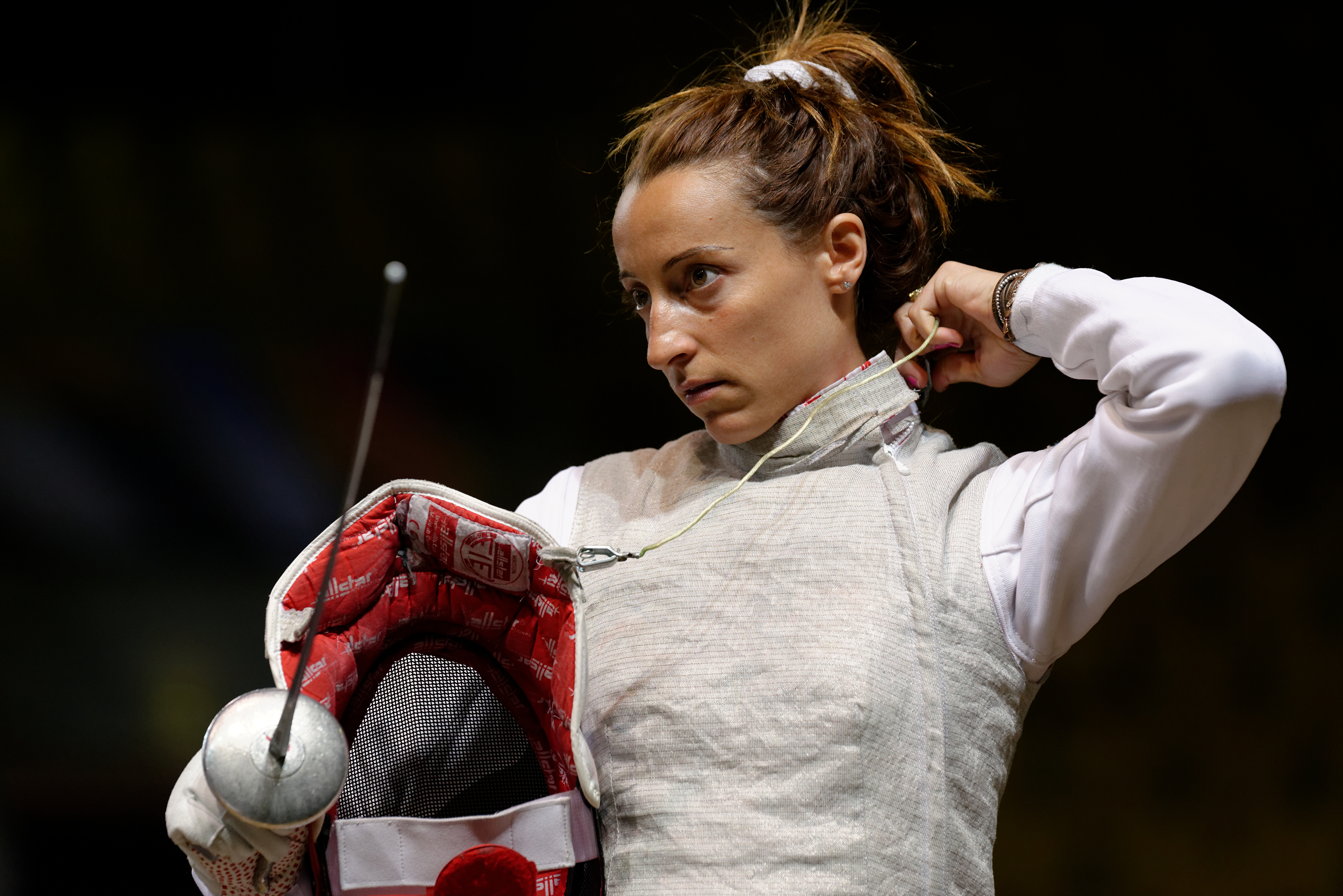
- Italian fencer Elisa Di Francisca during the 2014 European Fencing Championships
- Highest governing body: International Fencing Federation (FIE)
- First played: 14th century (documented in Ms. I.33)

Characteristics
- Contact: limited contact
- Team members: Individual and team
- Type: Combat sport, martial arts, women's sports

Presence
- Olympic: 1924 (foil); 1996 (épée); 2004 (sabre)

Women's fencing is the sport of fencing by women. Although most martial sports were predominantly male, women's fencing and swordplay can be traced back to medieval manuscripts such as Royal Armouries Ms. I.33, high society duelling, and early fencing schools.

The formalisation of competitive women's fencing began in the late 19th century, transitioning from being considered merely entertainment to true sport. Women's fencing made its Olympic debut at the 1924 Paris Games. Although women were restricted to foil — which was considered more socially appropriate and less violent — such restrictions were gradually abolished, due to evolving policies within the Fédération Internationale d'Escrime (FIE). International acceptance of women's épée and sabre was eventually completed with each joining the Olympic program in 1996 and 2004 respectively. Full Olympic gender parity across all individual and team events was achieved at the 2020 Tokyo Games.

Women's fencing is governed — like men's fencing — by the FIE. FIE rules for women's fencing are identical to that for men's fencing, and the equipment is equally identical excepting requirements for a chest protector, and differences in jacket design for women.

Various studies have shown some distinct characteristics between male and female fencers, such as differences in lower-limb mechanics and higher overall injury rates. Performance analyses of women's foil, épée, and sabre have found that women's fencing is predominantly defined by high-intensity actions, and reliance on the anaerobic alactic energy system.

== History ==
For much of history, fencing was predominantly practiced by men, and was considered a masculine sport. Documented examples of women duelling and fencing do exist however, even in the late Middle Ages and early modern period.

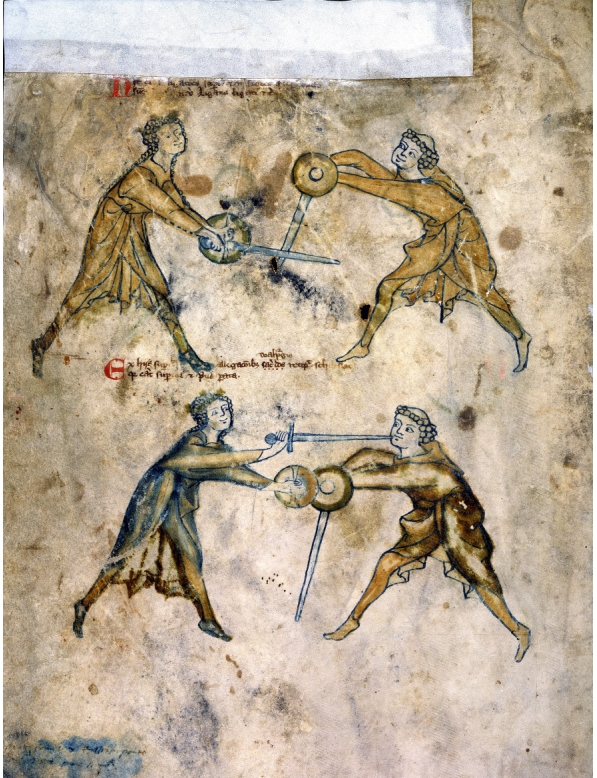
Walpurgis depicted fencing a priest

One of the oldest known illustrations of women fencing can be found in the Royal Armouries Ms. I.33, the earliest known fencing manual, in which a female figure known as Walpurgis is depicted using various techniques. Although Walpurgis' true identity remains subject to theory, her presence remains among the earliest known portrayals of women's fencing.

Among earlier duels between women was that between the former friends Isabella de Carazzi and Diambra de Pottinella at Naples in May 1552, who allegedly engaged in a public duel over the courtier Fabio di Zeresola. The duel was presided over by Marquis del Vasto, and a popular event in the Neapolitan court; gaining enough notoriety that Jusepe de Ribera later depicted it in his painting Women Gladiators.

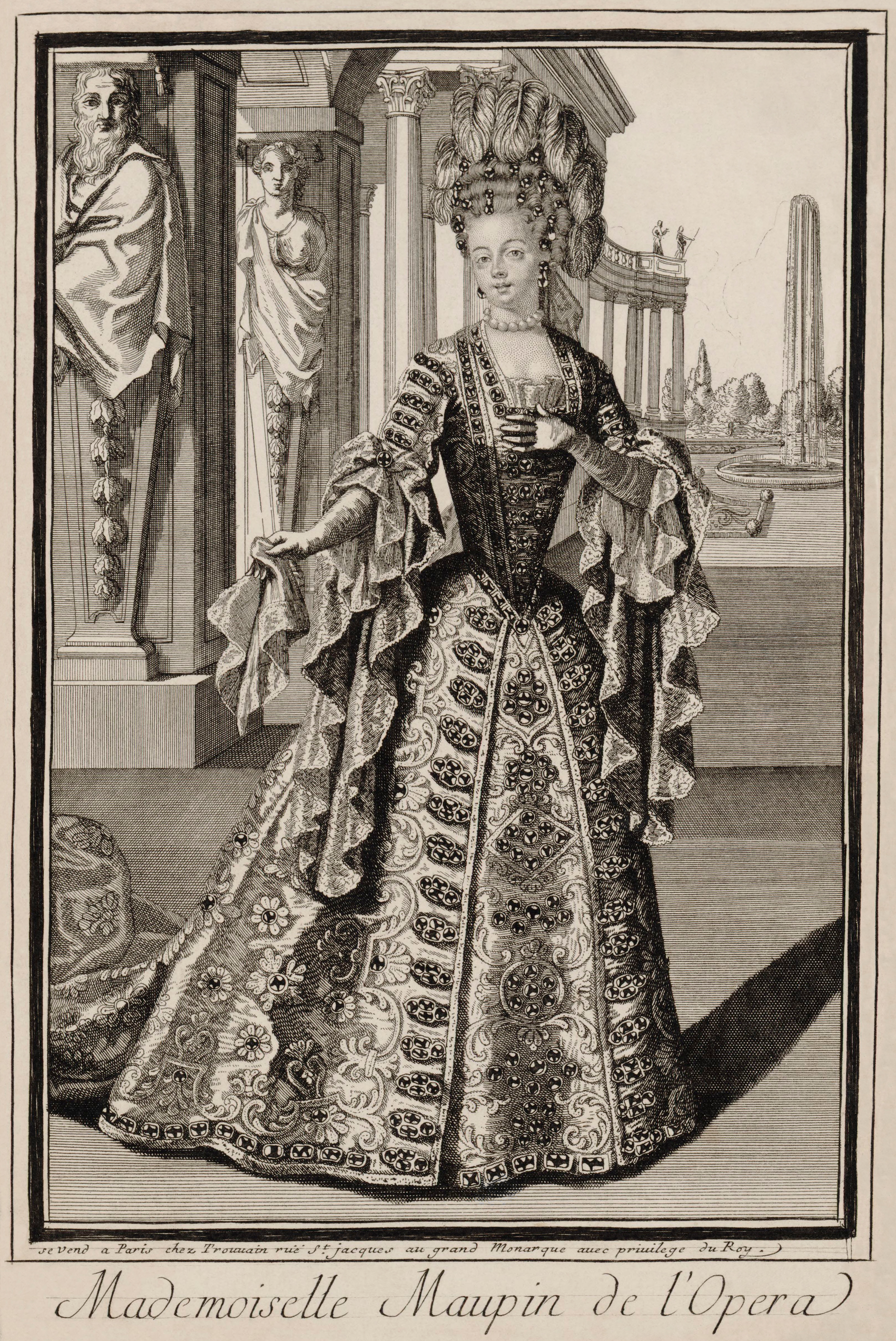
Julie d'Aubigny

In the late 17th century French opera singer Julie d'Aubigny (Mademoiselle Maupin) became famous for her skills as a duellist. Period accounts and later biographical works recount the many duels she engaged in during her life, the most famous of which being her fencing three noblemen in the same evening, having angered them by kissing a young lady they were courting while dressed as a man.

The 18th century saw a resurgence of female fencing, particularly among actresses who learned to fence in order to play breeches roles. Domenico Angelo's School of Arms in Soho Square was the first fencing school to accept female students, some of whom were actresses from London theatres. Among Angelo's pupils was the Duchess of Queensberry, a figure who also paid for her protégé Julius Soubise to be taught.

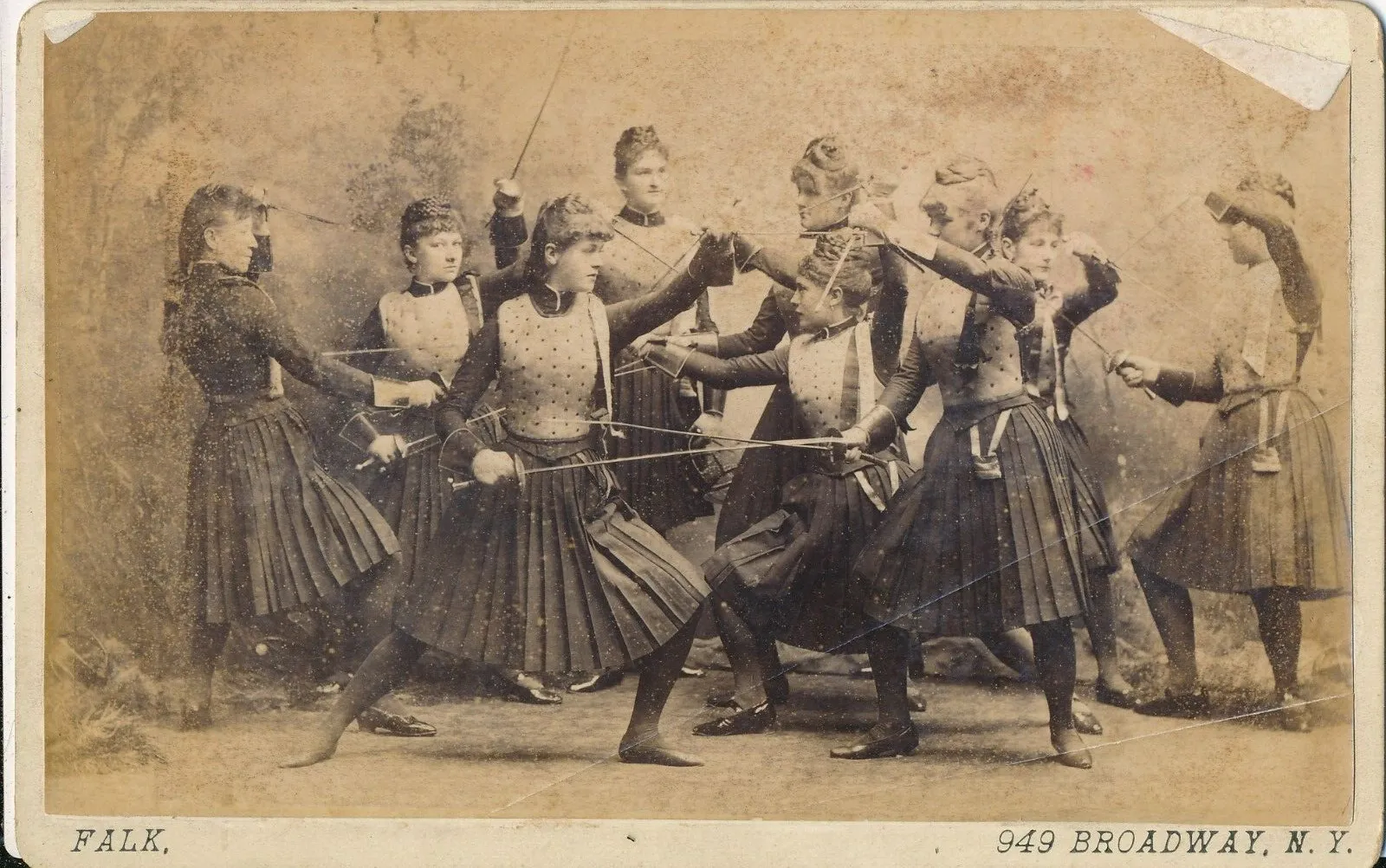
Hans Hartl's Corps of Viennese Fencing Ladies

Other fencing schools and instructors accepting female students were quick to follow in the 19th century, such as Thomas Monstery's New York School of Arms, and his most famous pupil Ella Hattan (also known as "Jaguarina"), who fenced throughout her lifetime and defeated many male challengers of her time. A few years later Hans Hartl would open his own "Corps of Viennese fencing ladies", which he toured during the Amateur Athletic Union's (AAU) first championship in 1888. According to Liu, these demonstrations marked the first time that women fencers appeared in such a prestigious competition.

In the 1800s, the widely reported topless "emancipated duel" — between Pauline von Metternich and Countess Anastasia von Kielmannsegg in August 1892 in Liechtenstein — was so called for reportedly being the first in which all participants were women. However the veracity of the event is uncertain, given that no first-hand accounts of the story are known, and Princess Metternich herself refuted the event as a "stupid and ridiculous hoax invented by Italian newspapers" (Canard stupide et ridicule inventé par journaux italiens). Ignaz Matthey argues the event was only a sensationalised news fabrication.

The late 19th and early 20th century began the shift from fencing being considered entertainment reserved for high society to being considered exercise and becoming an organised sport. Women were encouraged to fence in order to develop their posture and grace, but were warned to move "nicely rather than strongly and not to sacrifice everything in order to fulfil the desire of touching the opponent" (faire "bien" plutôt que "fort" [et ne] sacrifier [pas] tout au désir de toucher l'adversaire). Simultaneously, women's fencing clubs became more and more common, such as the Polytechnic Ladies' Fencing Club in London. In 1912 the Amateur Fencing League of America (AFLA) — later known as the United States Fencing Association — amended its constitution to admit women, leading to the first US Women's Foil Championship in the same year.

Increased acceptance of women's fencing was coupled with restrictions on the weapon women could use — namely foil — as unlike épée and sabre it was not associated with violence and danger, but rather with grace and form. Institutional and social restrictions on weapons women could use would persist throughout the 20th century, with women's épée and sabre only being accepted into the Olympics in 1996 and 2004 respectively.

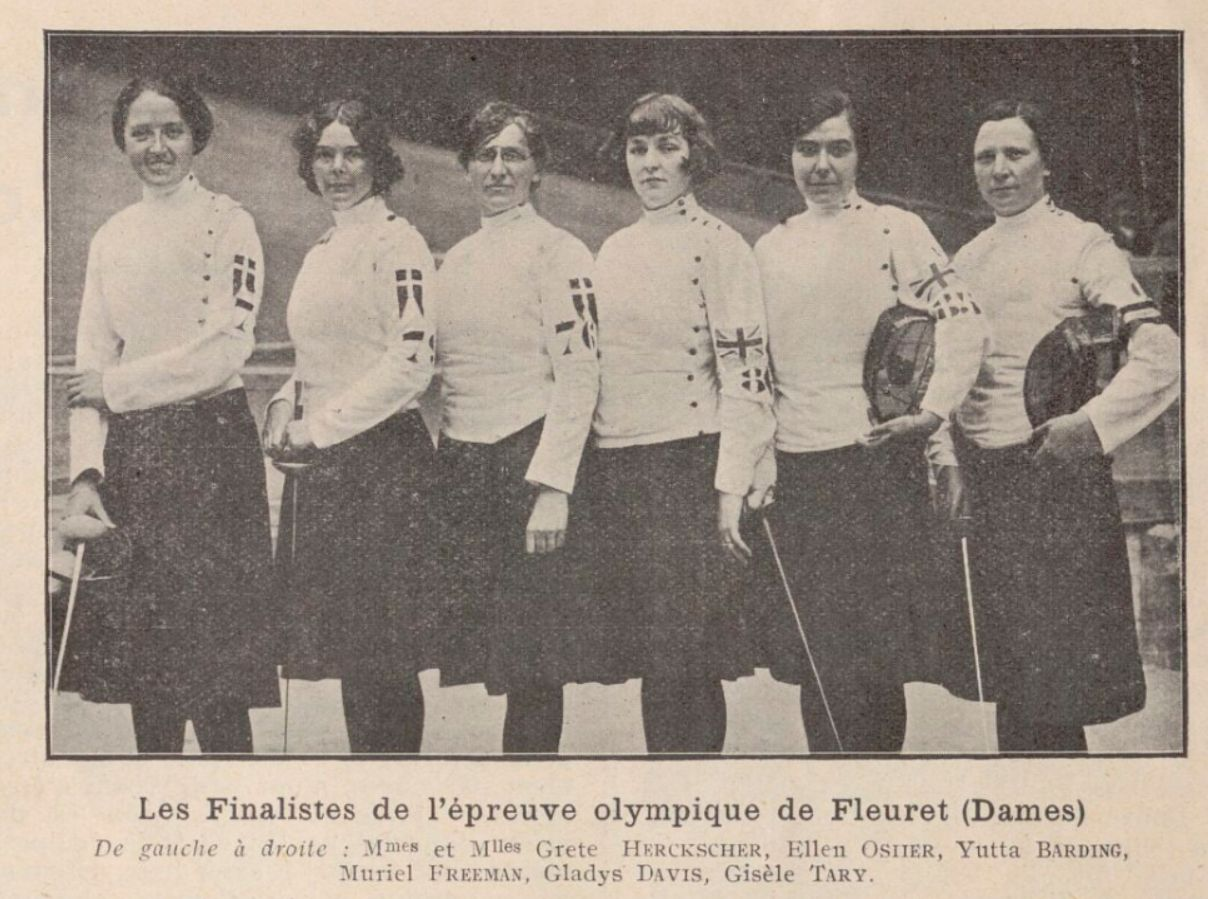
Finalists of women's foil Paris 1924. Yutta Barding is pictured third from the left.

The first structured fencing competitions between women began in the 20th century and soon became frequent. In 1907 Great Britain held the first recurring Women's Foil National Championship, which was won by Millicent Hall. Three years later, on 31 March 1910, Britain hosted a women's team from Belgium, which won; De Nieuwe Courant later described it as an informal contest rather than a match. The following year a Dutch team travelled to England for an official match, which England won. Between 1915 and 1918, Denmark held a women's foil event in the national championship, and Yutta Barding came first in the 1918 event. The Fédération Nationale d'Escrime (FNE) would sponsor what Terret describes as the first international foil competition for women in June 1921, in which Yutta Barding again came first.

Throughout this period, women had been required to wear long pleated skirts in fencing competitions, as the FIE had set dress rules requiring skirts in 1923. From February 1928, some women complained that the skirts were uncomfortable and dangerous. At the 1932 Olympics, Judy Guinness was one of the first women to wear breeches, and in 1935 the FIE officially removed the compulsory mandate for skirts, making bloomers the official dress for women.

== Olympic era ==
The first appearance of women's fencing in an Olympic event was in the foil Open event at the 1908 Summer Olympics, in which the aforementioned Millicent Hall took part. This event was however considered "artistic" rather than competitive.

Discussion of a women's event in the Olympics by the FIE was carried out at the 1921 congress at the request of Julie Simonsen, transmitted by the delegate of Denmark, but ultimately rejected on the grounds that the International Olympic Committee (IOC) "formally opposed any increase in the number of events, and any request that the F.I.E. may make is therefore doomed to failure" (formellement opposé a toute augmentation du nombre des epreuves et la demande que pourrait en faire la F.I.E. etant vouée, de ces chef, à un échec certain). This reasoning was faulty — as acknowledged by René Lacroix in the 1922 congress — as the IOC had made "no mention of such a refusal" (ne fait pas mention de ce refus) and had deferred the matter to the FIE at the request of the Marquis de Chasseloup‐Laubat. In the same 1922 congress, the FIE successfully passed — with 39 votes against 22 — a vote for an individual women's competition to be held in the 1924 Olympics.

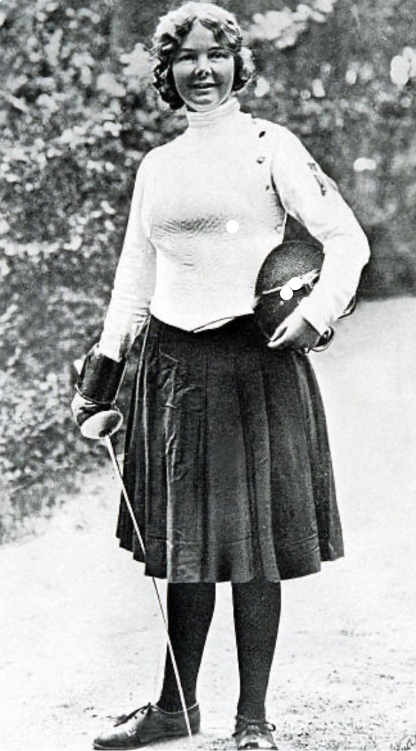
Ellen Osiier, winner of the Paris Summer Olympics, women's individual foil

These discussions ultimately led to the first acceptance of competitive women's fencing in the Olympics with the 1924 women's individual foil event in which Danish fencer Ellen Osiier came first. This event was also among the earlier introductions of women's events in the Olympics.

Despite this first breakthrough, women's fencing continued to be restricted to foil, regardless of attempts to widen the scope to include épée by Swiss delegate Dr Mende in the 1929 FIE congress, where he argued that "there is no reason for women not to use an épée" (Il n'y a donc aucune raison pour que la femme ne puis se servir de l'epée) and Switzerland had already previously held women's épée events.

Progress in team events for women's foil began for the first time in the World Championships held in Copenhagen, on 5 May 1932 following a proposal by the Danish Fencing Federation for the 25th anniversary of the Danish Fencing Federation. Women's foil team fencing continued in the world championships in the Olympic years of 1932, 1936, 1948, 1952, and 1956, although it was a separate event from the Olympics.

Women's team foil finally appeared in the 1960 Summer Olympics held in Rome, following a request by the FIE in 1957. According to Terret this request was made primarily due to the financial instability within the fencing world — mirroring the earlier development of women's foil for monetary purposes — rather than concerns over gender equality. It was confirmed by the IOC during its Congress in Tokyo in 1958.

Helene Mayer fencing Judy Guinness. The length of black piping across the jacket can be seen on Helene Mayer (in dress)

In 1964, the target area for foil was made the same between men and women, where previously touches below the waist (delineated by a length of black piping) had been off-target.

On the 8 June, 1972, the US government passed Title IX, a law that prohibited sex-based discrimination in educational institutions that receive funding from the federal government. Following the passing of Title IX, fencing clubs and teams and scholarships available to women increased, and as of 2026 there are over 40 women's NCAA programs for fencing in the US.

The International Union of Modern Pentathlon (UIPM) held its first women's World Cup in 1978 in Jönköping, Sweden, which included an épée event. A few years later women's épée was added to the fencing national championship in US in 1981.

In consequence of the increase in international and national women's épée, the FIE soon reconsidered its position, and in 1983 the FIE's Executive Committee requested that the Regulation Committee consider the matter, but immediately received backlash from Olympic foil champion Ilona Elek — winner of more fencing titles than any other woman — leading to the formation of a commission made up of five women to investigate the matter. Due to insufficient reports, and having found that women's épée fencing was present in 23 countries, the FIE decided to hold a "world criterion event" at the 1988 World Fencing Championships to try out regulations, and women's epée was completely introduced in the 1989 World Fencing Championships. Women were only allowed to use the traditional French grip at this time, as the pistol grip was considered too dangerous.

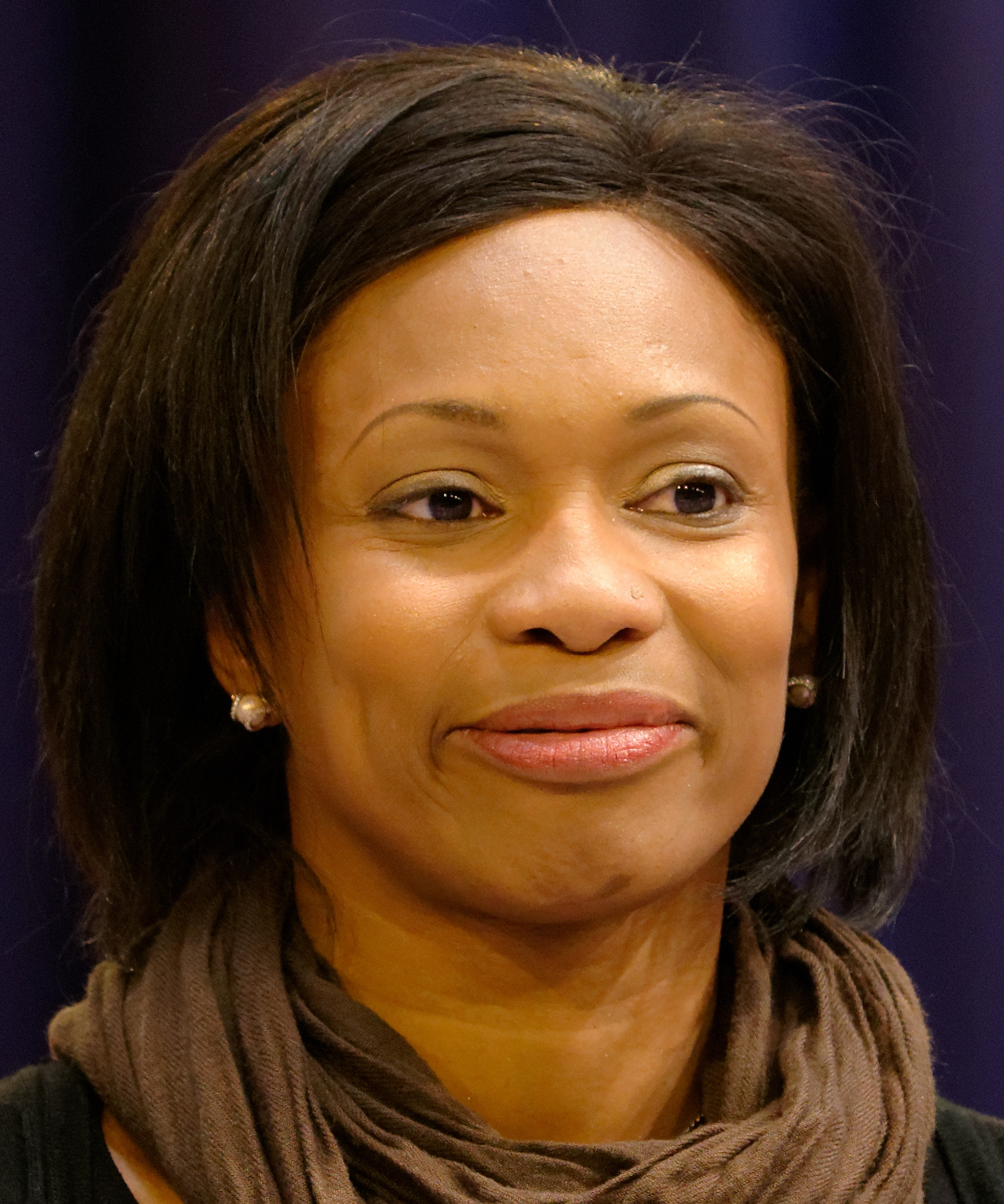
Laura Flessel-Colovic, winner of the 1996 Summer Olympics women's Individual épée event

Women's épée — both individual and team — was introduced in the 1996 Summer Olympics in Atlanta, where Laura Flessel-Colovic won gold in the individual event, and France in the team event. This was also the first year in which women were able to use the pistol grip.

Progress had also been made in the meanwhile for women's sabre fencing, when in 1988 women's sabre was added to the Fencing National Championship, marking the fall of the last barrier of women's fencing in the US. In 1998 the FIE decided that women's sabre would be added to the next world championships which would be held in Seoul the following year, despite opinions described by Le Monde that sabre was "too demanding and where the blows are carried out in a manner too violent for frail shoulders" (trop physique et que les coups y étaient portés de façon trop violente pour de frêles épaules).

Women's sabre fencing was finally introduced to the 2004 Summer Olympics in Athens following a 59–23 FIE vote at the 2002 FIE Extraordinary congress. Despite the FIE initially intending to introduce both individual and team women's sabre to the Olympics, an IOC quota limiting fencing to 10 events meant only an Individual event was introduced, and women's team foil was temporarily removed.

The Olympic limit of 10 events continued until the 2020 Summer Olympics, which marked the first complete fencing Olympics with all 12 fencing events.

== Rules and equipment ==
Fencing is both an individual and team sport, individual bouts are typically up to 15 touches, and team matches are made up of 9 relay bouts scored up to 5 touches each. The rules for women's fencing are identical to those for men's fencing, and the jacket and chest protector differ between men and women.

The jacket — which protects the whole upper body excepting the head — is form-fitting for both men and women, but especially so for the women's versions which have a more tailored waist.

The chest protector or chest guard protects the upper chest and is made of a rigid material, usually plastic. It is the only piece of gear which is compulsory for women but not for men.

== Governance ==
Women's fencing is governed internationally by the Fédération Internationale d'Escrime (FIE). The FIE has held European (in effect world) championships for women since 1929, and has included women in the Olympics since 1924.

== Analyses ==
Analyses have shown some biomechanical and physiological differences between male and female fencers, such as female fencers displaying greater hip adduction, knee abduction or adduction, ankle eversion and patellofemoral contact forces of the leading leg during lunging movements, although they display lower Achilles tendon loading rates. Female fencers also had higher injury rates than their male counterparts.

A study conducted by J. Matthew Wylde, Frankie H.Y. Tan, and G. Peter O'Donoghue found that elite women's foil fencing is characterized by intermittent high-intensity efforts interspersed with extended periods of low- and moderate-intensity activity. The representation of high-intensity activity indicated that female fencers rely on the anaerobic alactic energy system during bouts. Although the study concluded that the only "large" difference between 15-touch, 5-touch and team bouts was in the low-intensity movement category, a later study by Matthew J. Wylde and Low Chee Yong on adolescent female foil fencing found that "adolescent female foil fencers perform a greater percentage of high-intensity movement in 5-touch bouts compared to 15-touch bouts" and "demonstrate a higher heart-rate in the 15-touch bouts".

Another study by Giulio S. Roi and Diana Bianchedi found that during women's épée competitions fencers' heart rates were elevated for most of the bout, and were above the anaerobic threshold for almost half the time.

A performance analysis on men and women's sabre found that on average female sabreurs had fewer actions in a fencing bout than male sabreurs. Of these actions almost half were offensive, and the majority occurred within the central piste. Female sabreurs on average had a significantly higher effective fighting time than male sabreurs, and similarly female sabreurs had a higher action-to-break ratio than male sabreurs. Female sabreurs' bouts were also shorter on average than male sabreurs' bouts. The study concluded that female sabreurs generally took longer to finish actions, relied less on first-intention attacks, and experienced shorter recovery times, and that the primary metabolic pathway was the anaerobic alactic.

== Bibliography ==
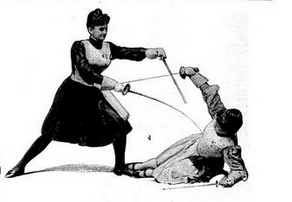
Threat parried with the dagger and straight threat with sword

- (in French) Alexandre Bergès, L'Escrime et la femme, D. Benoist, Paris, 1896.
- Paola Luisa Mangiacapra, Comparative Energy Cost of Fencing for Women, University of Illinois at Urbana–Champaign, 1968.
- Zhou Yongchen, "Analysis of the Women's Fencing in Our Country", Journal of Anhui Sports Science, 2000.
- Anita Evangelista, Nick Evangelista, The Woman Fencer, Wish Publishing, Terre Haute, 2001 – ISBN 9781930546486.
- Milly Mogulof, Foiled:Hitler's Jewish Olympian: The Helene Mayer Story, RDR Books, Oakland, 2002 – ISBN 9781571430922.
- Zhang Ai-min, Zhu Yi-qun, Wu Xia-ping, "Investigation and Analysis on the Statue Quo of Chinese Women Sabre Fencing", Journal of Nanjing Institute of Physical Education, 2004.
- Sherraine MacKay, Running With Swords: The Adventures and Misadventures of the Irrepressible Canadian Fencing Champion, Fitzhenry & Whiteside, Markham, 2005 – ISBN 9781550419825.
- (in Italian) Valentina Vezzali, A viso scoperto, Sperling & Kupfer, Milan, 2006 – ISBN 9788820041625.
- Jiang Lan, "Application of Counter Offensive Technology in Modern Women Epee Competition", Journal of Nanjing Institute of Physical Education, 2008.
- Dai Qing, Shu Jian-ping, "The Utilization of Counterattack in Female Epee Competition", Journal of Hefei University, 2008.
- Raúl Bescós, Marc Esteve, Jordi Porta, Mercè Mateu, Alfredo Irurtia, Martin Voracek, "Prenatal programming of sporting success: Associations of digit ratio (2D:4D), a putative marker for prenatal androgen action, with world rankings in female fencers", Journal of Sports Sciences, 2009.
- M. Voracek, B. Reimer, S. G. Dressler, "Digit ratio (2D:4D) predicts sporting success among female fencers independent from physical, experience, and personality factors", Scandinavian Journal of Medicine & Science in Sports, 2010.
- Thierry Terret, Cécile Ottogalli-Mazzacavallo, "Women in Weapon Land: The Rise of International Women's Fencing", The International Journal of the History of Sport, 2012.
- (in Italian) Valentina Vezzali, Betta Carbone, Io, Valentina Vezzali, Baldini & Castoldi, Milan, 2012 – ISBN 9788866203551.

== See also ==
- Women's fencing in Australia
- Fencing
