= Ilona Elek =

Hungarian fencer

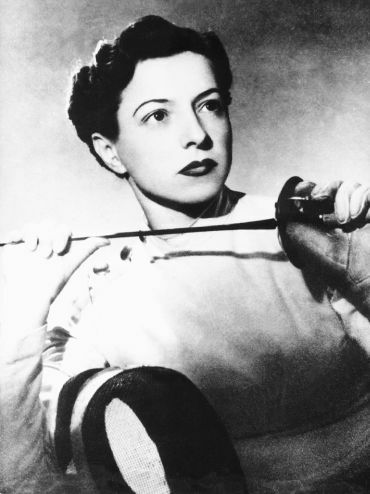

Personal information
- Full name: Ilona Elek-Schacherer
- Born: Ilona Elek; 17 May 1907 Budapest, Hungary
- Died: 24 July 1988 (aged 81) Budapest, Hungary

Sport
- Sport: Fencing
- Event: Foil
Medal record
Women's fencing
Representing Hungary
Women's Fencing
Olympic Games
Gold medal – first place	1936 Berlin	Foil individual
Gold medal – first place	1948 London	Foil individual
Silver medal – second place	1952 Helsinki	Foil individual
World Championships
Gold medal – first place	1934 Warsaw	Individual foil
Gold medal – first place	1934 Warsaw	Team foil
Gold medal – first place	1935 Lausanne	Individual foil
Gold medal – first place	1935 Lausanne	Team foil
Gold medal – first place	1937 Paris	Team foil
Gold medal – first place	1951 Stockholm	Individual foil
Gold medal – first place	1952 Copenhagen	Team foil
Gold medal – first place	1953 Brussels	Team foil
Gold medal – first place	1954 Luxembourg	Team foil
Gold medal – first place	1955 Rome	Team foil
Silver medal – second place	1936 Sanremo	Team foil
Silver medal – second place	1937 Paris	Individual foil
Silver medal – second place	1948 The Hague	Team foil
Silver medal – second place	1951 Stockholm	Team foil
Silver medal – second place	1954 Luxembourg	Individual foil
Bronze medal – third place	1955 Rome	Individual foil
Bronze medal – third place	1956 London	Team foil

Ilona Elek, known also as Ilona Elek-Schacherer (née “Elek"; 17 May 1907 – 24 July 1988) was a Hungarian Olympic fencer. Elek won more international fencing titles than any other woman.

== Early and personal life ==
Elek was born on 17 May 1907, in Budapest, Kingdom of Hungary to a Hungarian-Jewish father born Eisler who 1939 converted to Lutheranism and a Roman-Catholic mother. She had seven siblings, including two-time Olympic fencer Margit Elek, and her mother died when she was 11 years old. She graduated from a music school. When Hungary entered World War II on the side of Nazi Germany, Hungarian Jews were forbidden from entering fencing competitions, and so Elek and her sister, who was also half-Jewish, were unable to compete until after the war ended.

== Fencing career ==
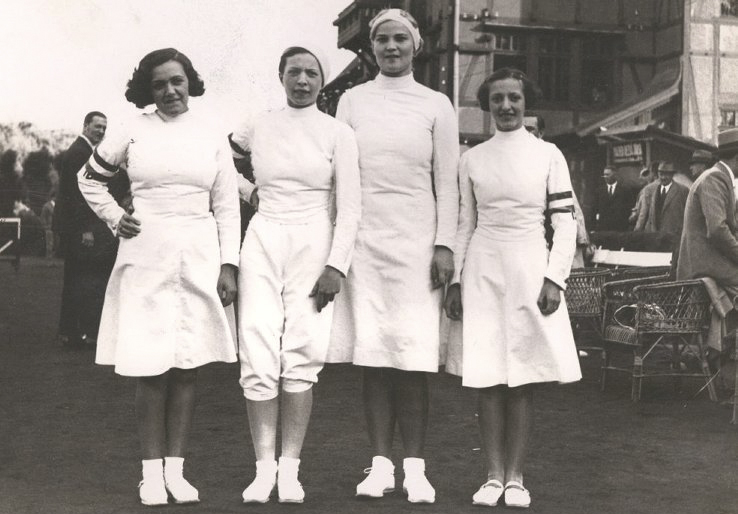
Margit Danÿ, Ilona Elek, Erna Bogen-Bogáti, and Margit Elek in 1933.

Elek competed for Hungary in three Olympiads, winning three medals. She is considered to be one of the greatest female fencers in the history of the sport.

=== Hungarian National Championships ===
Elek won the Hungarian foil championship in 1946–47, 1949–50, and 1952.

=== World Championships ===
Elek won the gold medal in women's foil at the World Championships in 1934, 1935, and 1951. She won silver in 1937 and 1954, and bronze in 1955.

=== Olympics ===
Elek was the first woman to win two Olympic gold medals in the individual foil competition.

Elek's first Olympic competition was at the 1936 Summer Olympics in Berlin, Germany, at the age of 29. She won the gold medal in the foil event, the first Hungarian woman to win a gold medal at the Olympics. In the process, Elek, who was Jewish, defeated a German with a Jewish father, Helene Mayer. The bronze medal went to Ellen Preis, an Austrian Jew.

The Games were cancelled in 1940 and 1944. When the Games resumed after World War II, at age 41 she repeated her performance as Olympic champion by winning a gold medal in the 1948 Summer Olympics in London, England. Ellen Preis again won the bronze medal.

Elek won the silver medal at the 1952 Helsinki Games. After winning her first five matches in the final pool, she was in contention for the gold medal, but she lost to American Maxine Mitchell, and Italian Irene Camber, who won the gold.

=== Awards ===
She was later awarded the Robert Feyerick Cup and the Olympic Order.

== International Fencing Federation ==
In 1983, she was the International Fencing Federation honorary President.

== Later years and death ==
Elek later was a director of a trade company. She died in Budapest at the age of 81.

== See also ==
- List of select Jewish fencers
- List of Jewish Olympic medalists
