= Carl Gripenstedt =

Swedish fencer

Personal information
- Born: 23 February 1893 Nyköping, Sweden
- Died: 30 April 1981 (aged 88) Örebro, Sweden

Sport
- Sport: Fencing
- Club: Föreningen för Fäktkonstens Främjande
Medal record
Men's fencing
Representing Sweden
World Fencing Championships
Silver medal – second place	1935 Lausanne	Team épée
Silver medal – second place	1931 Vienna	Team épée
Silver medal – second place	1934 Warsaw	Team épée

Carl Gripenstedt (23 February 1893 – 30 April 1981) was a Swedish fencer.

Gripenstedt was born at Nynäs Castle in present Nyköping Municipality and represented Föreningen för Fäktkonstens Främjande as a fencer. He competed in the épée events at the 1920 and 1924 Summer Olympics. He reached the semi-finals in the 1924 individual épée event. Gripensted also won three team medals at the World Fencing Championships, a 1931 bronze, a 1934 bronze, and a 1935 silver.

Gripenstedt, a friherre and hovjägmästare, ran the ironworks at Brevens bruk. He died in Odensbacken, Örebro.

Carl Gripenstedt was the brother of fencer Ebba Gripenstedt.
