= Renée Garilhe =

French fencer (1923–1991)

Personal information
- Born: 15 June 1923 Paris, France
- Died: 6 July 1991 (aged 68)

Sport
- Sport: Fencing
Medal record
Women's fencing
Representing France
Olympic Games
Bronze medal – third place	1956 Melbourne	Foil, individual
World Championships
Gold medal – first place	1950 Monte Carlo	Foil, individual
Gold medal – first place	1950 Monte Carlo	Foil, team
Gold medal – first place	1951 Stockholm	Foil, team
Silver medal – second place	1947 Lisbon	Foil, team
Silver medal – second place	1952 Copenhagen	Foil, team
Silver medal – second place	1953 Brussels	Foil, individual
Silver medal – second place	1953 Brussels	Foil, team
Silver medal – second place	1955 Rome	Foil, team
Silver medal – second place	1956 London	Foil, team
Bronze medal – third place	1948 The Hague	Foil, team
Bronze medal – third place	1954 Luxembourg	Foil, individual
Bronze medal – third place	1954 Luxembourg	Foil, team
Bronze medal – third place	1958 Philadelphia	Foil, team

Renée Garilhe (15 June 1923 – 6 July 1991) was a French fencer. She won a bronze medal in the women's individual foil event at the 1956 Summer Olympics, and a gold medal in both women's individual foil and foil team events at the 1950 World Fencing Championships.
