= Irene Camber =

Italian fencer (1926–2024)

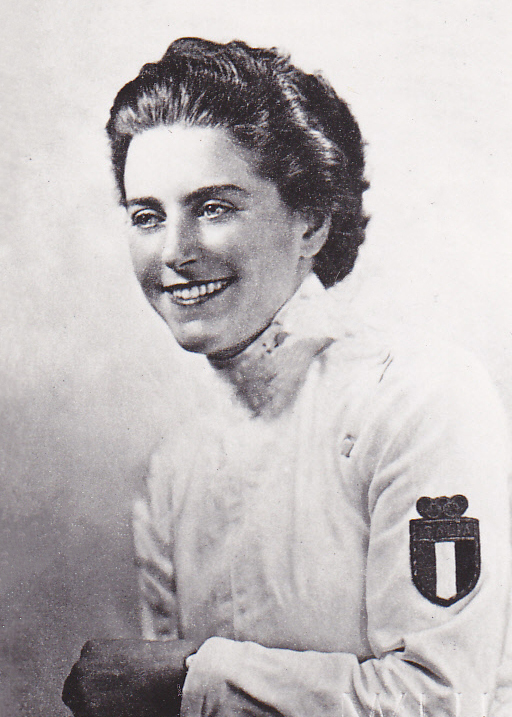
- Camber in 1960

Personal information
- Nationality: Italian
- Born: 12 February 1926 Trieste, Italy
- Died: 23 February 2024 (aged 98) Lissone, Italy
- Height: 169 cm (5 ft 7 in)
- Weight: 63 kg (139 lb)

Sport
- Country: Italy
- Sport: Fencing
- Event: Foil
- Club: SS Cassa di Risparmio, Milan
Medal record
Olympic Games
Gold medal – first place	1952 Helsinki	Foil Individual
Bronze medal – third place	1960 Rome	Foil Team
World Championships
Gold medal – first place	1953 Brussels	Foil Individual
Gold medal – first place	1957 Paris	Foil Team
Silver medal – second place	1954 Luxembourg	Foil Team
Bronze medal – third place	1957 Paris	Foil Individual
Bronze medal – third place	1952 Copenhagen	Foil Team
Bronze medal – third place	1953 Brussels	Foil Team
Bronze medal – third place	1955 Rome	Foil Team
Bronze medal – third place	1962 Buenos Aires	Foil Team

Irene Camber-Corno (12 February 1926 – 23 February 2024) was an Italian fencer and Olympic champion in foil competition.

== Biography ==
Irene Camber was born in Trieste, Italy, on 12 February 1926. She began to be interested in fencing at eight years-old in Trieste. Her involvement in fencing was accidental: instead of entering the hall where she used to practice gymnastics, she mistakenly entered the fencing hall. She had four appearances at Olympic Games: London (1948), Helsinki (1952), Rome (1960) and Tokyo (1964).

After graduating with a Bachelor of Science degree in industrial chemistry, she made her debut at the London Games in 1948. She was defeated in the semi-finals. Four years later at the Helsinki Games, she faced two-time Olympic champion (at Berlin and London Games) 45-year-old Hungarian Ilona Elek. She won the match by 4–3. She did not appear at the Melbourne Games, since she was pregnant. At the Rome Games in 1960, she won a bronze team medal. She lastly took part in the Italian fencing team at the Tokyo Games. She won medals at the world fencing championships. Then she began to serve as the national team coach at the Munich Games, and Antonella Ragno, her pupil, won the gold medal. Camber also worked at Montedison chemical corporation during her fencing career.

== Death ==
Camber died in Lissone on 23 February 2024, at the age of 98.

== Achievements ==
Camber received a gold medal in the individual foil at the 1952 Summer Olympics in Helsinki. At the 1960 Summer Olympics in Rome she received a bronze medal in foil team. She also earned two titles – one individually (1953) and one with the Italian team (1957) – and six more medals at the Fencing World Championships.

== See also ==
- Walk of Fame of Italian sport
- Italian sportswomen multiple medalists at Olympics and World Championships
