= Jean Levavasseur =

French fencer (1924–1999)

Personal information
- Born: 8 June 1924 Chatou, Yvelines, France
- Died: 10 February 1999 (aged 74) Poissy, Yvelines, France

Sport
- Sport: Fencing
Medal record
Men's fencing
Representing France
Olympic Games
| Bronze medal – third place | 1952 Helsinki | Team sabre |
Mediterranean Games
| Silver medal – second place | 1955 Barcelona | Team sabre |
World Fencing Championships
| Gold medal – first place | 1950 Monte Carlo | Individual sabre |
| Silver medal – second place | 1949 Cairo | Team sabre |
| Silver medal – second place | 1950 Monte Carlo | Team sabre |
| Bronze medal – third place | 1954 Luxembourg | Team sabre |

Jean Levavasseur (8 June 1924 – 10 February 1999) was a French fencer. He won a bronze medal in the team sabre event at the 1952 Summer Olympics.

He competed World Fencing Championships in 1949, winning a silver medal in the team sabre event, in 1950, winning a gold medal in the individual sabre event and a silver medal in the team sabre event, and in 1954, winning a bronze medal in the team sabre event. He won a silver medal at the 1955 Mediterranean Games in the team sabre event.
