= Pál Kovács =

Hungarian fencer (1912–1995)

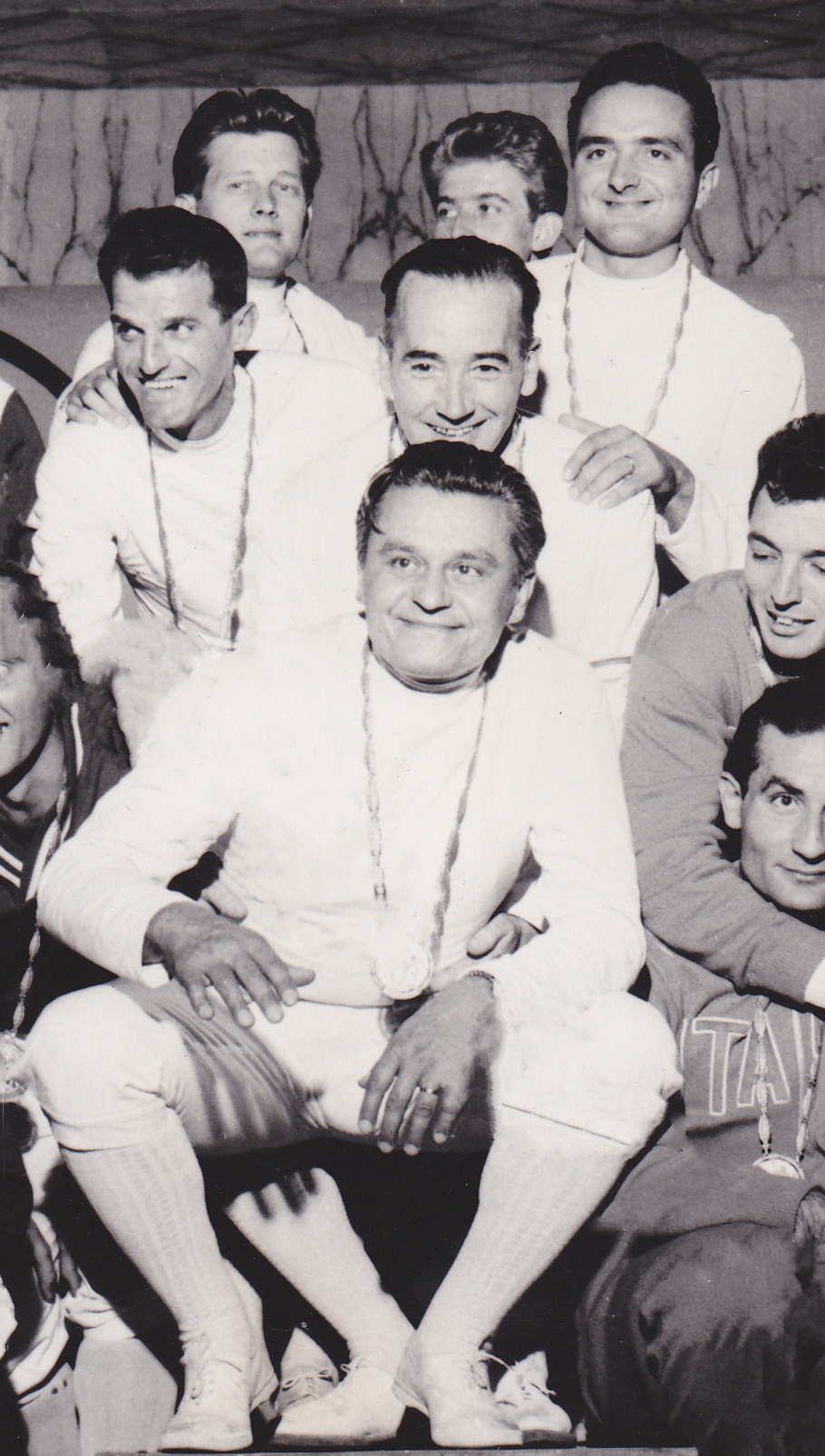
- Hungarian sabre team at the 1960 Olympics, Kovács is in the center, just above Aladár Gerevich

Personal information
- Born: 17 July 1912 Debrecen, Hungary
- Died: 8 July 1995 (aged 82) Budapest, Hungary
- Height: 1.79 m (5 ft 10 in)
- Weight: 80 kg (176 lb)

Fencing career
- Sport: Fencing
- Weapon: sabre
- Hand: right-handed
- Club: Honvéd Tiszti Vívó Klub ÖT; Ganz-Mávag SportegyesületMávag SportegyesületVasas Sport Club
Medal record
Representing Hungary
Olympic Games
Gold medal – first place	1936 Berlin	Team sabre
Gold medal – first place	1948 London	Team sabre
Gold medal – first place	1952 Helsinki	Team sabre
Gold medal – first place	1952 Helsinki	Individual sabre
Gold medal – first place	1956 Melbourne	Team sabre
Gold medal – first place	1960 Rome	Team Sabre
Bronze medal – third place	1948 London	Individual sabre
World Championships
Gold medal – first place	1933 Budapest	Team sabre
Gold medal – first place	1937 Paris	Team sabre
Gold medal – first place	1951 Stockholm	Team sabre
Gold medal – first place	1953 Brussels	Team sabre
Gold medal – first place	1954 Luxembourg	Team sabre
Gold medal – first place	1955 Rome	Team sabre
Gold medal – first place	1957 Paris	Team sabre
Gold medal – first place	1958 Philadelphia	Team sabre

Pál Kovács (17 July 1912 – 8 July 1995) was a Hungarian athlete, who began as a hurdler, but eventually switched to fencing.

By the time Kovács won his first fencing gold, in 1936, he had already been a member of the winning Hungarian team at the 1933 World Championships. The Hungarians won team sabre gold in five successive Olympics, lasting from 1936 until 1960. The same team won gold eight back-to-back world championships (including the two Olympics, which double as world championships in their respective years). Kovács also won individual gold in 1952, as well as individual bronze in 1948. In 1980, he became vice-president of the Fédération Internationale d'Escrime. He died in Budapest in July 1995.

== See also ==
- List of multiple Olympic gold medalists in one event
- List of multiple Olympic gold medalists
