= Lídia Sákovicsné Dömölky =

Hungarian fencer (born 1936)

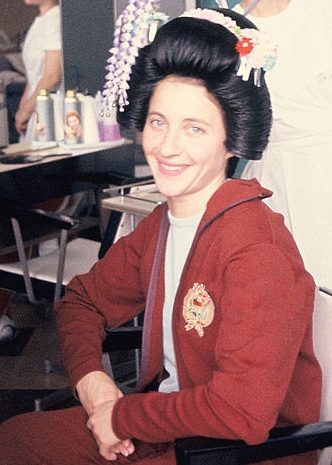
- Dömölky at a hairdresser at the 1964 Olympics

Personal information
- Born: 9 March 1936 (age 90) Budapest, Hungary
- Height: 1.65 m (5 ft 5 in)
- Weight: 55 kg (121 lb)

Sport
- Sport: Fencing
- Club: Budapesti Haladás; Vörös Meteor, Budapest
Medal record
Representing Hungary
Olympic Games
Gold medal – first place	1964 Tokyo	Team foil
Silver medal – second place	1960 Rome	Team foil
Silver medal – second place	1968 Mexico	Team foil
World Fencing Championships
Gold medal – first place	1955 Rome	Individual foil
Gold medal – first place	1955 Rome	Team foil
Gold medal – first place	1959 Budapest	Team foil
Gold medal – first place	1967 Montreal	Team foil
Silver medal – second place	1961 Turin	Team foil
Silver medal – second place	1963 Gdansk	Team foil
Silver medal – second place	1963 Gdansk	Team foil
Silver medal – second place	1966 Moscow	Team foil
Bronze medal – third place	1956 London	Team foil
Summer Universiade
Gold medal – first place	1963 Porto Alegre	Individual foil
Silver medal – second place	1963 Porto Alegre	Team foil

Lídia Sákovicsné Dömölky (born 9 March 1936) is a retired Hungarian fencer. She competed at the 1956, 1960, 1964 and 1968 Olympics and won one gold and two silver medals.

== Sports career ==
In 1955, aged 19, Dömölky won her first and only individual world title, though she continued winning other medals at the World Championships until 1967. After the 1956 Olympics, while touring the United States, she and her husband, József Sákovics, a fellow fencer, defected and stayed there for a year. Dömölky worked as a draftswoman and her husband as an auto mechanic. Dissatisfied, they returned to Budapest, where they lived ever since.

== Post-sports career ==
After retiring from competitions around 1968 Sákovicsné Dömölky received a degree in physical education and a coaching certificate, yet instead of coaching she mostly worked as a sportswriter and co-authored several books on gymnastics and the culture of artistic movement. In 1996 she and her husband spent another year in the United States, as visiting coaches to the Harvard fencing team.

== Personal life ==
Her brother, Georges Dömölky, also competed in fencing and defected to the United States permanently.
