= Raoul Årmann =

Swedish fencer

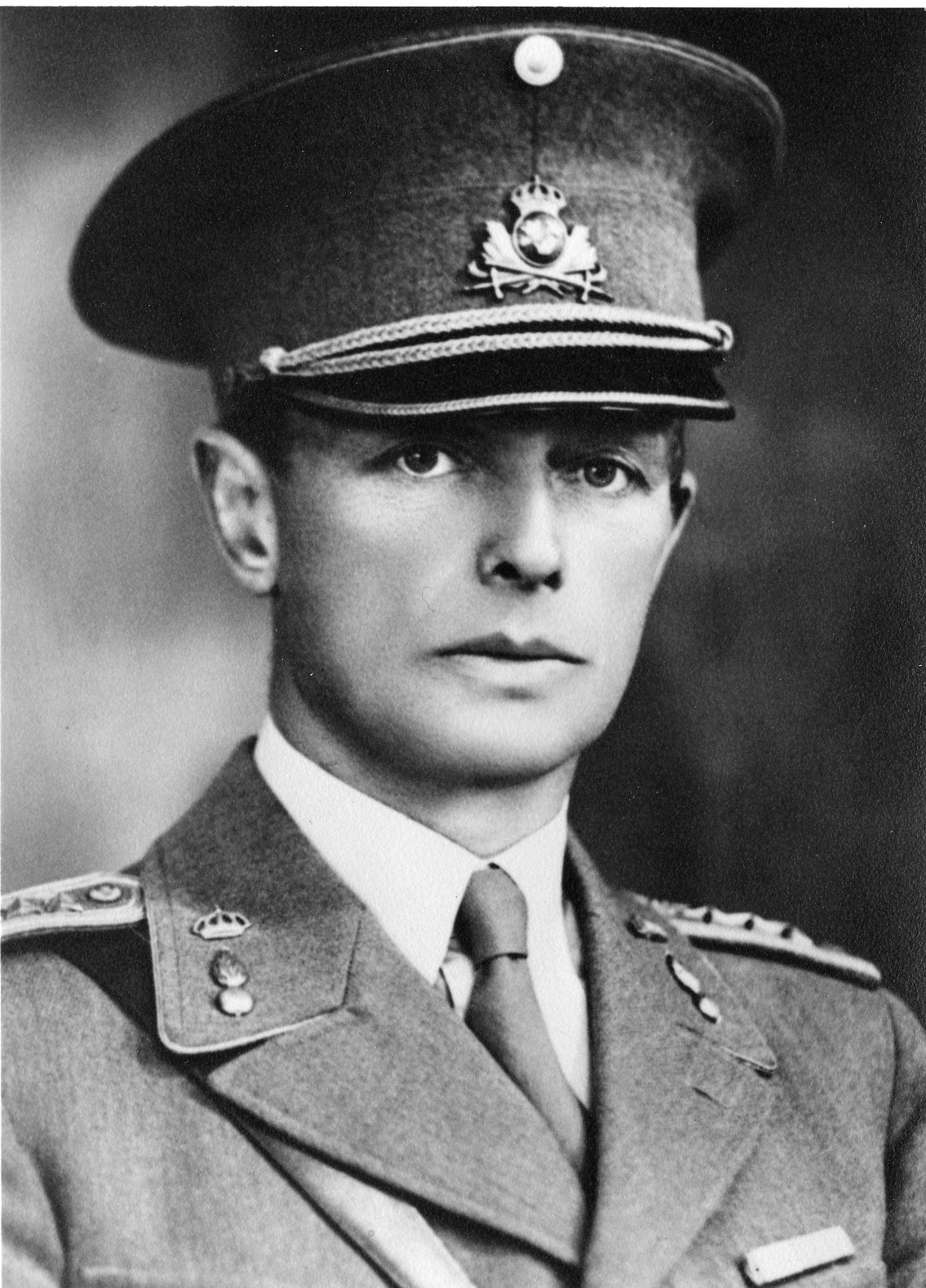

Sport
- Sport: Fencing
Medal record
World Fencing Championships
Bronze medal – third place	1933 Budapest	Team épée

Raoul Nils Alvar Årmann was an épée fencer. He was a member of the Swedish team, which won the bronze medal in the 1933 World Fencing Championships.

== Biography ==
Årmann originated from Sweden and was an épée fencer. In 1933, he was a member of the Swedish team at the 1933 World Fencing Championships in Budapest. The team won a bronze medal in the team épée.
