= 1927 World Fencing Championships =

International fencing competition

1927 World Championships in Fencing
- Host city: Vichy, France

The 1927 World Fencing Championships were held in Vichy, France.

== Medal summary ==
=== Men's events ===
Event	Gold	Silver	Bronze
Individual Foil	(Kingdom of Italy) Oreste Puliti	(France) Philippe Cattiau	(Kingdom of Italy) Gioacchino Guaragna
Individual Sabre	(Hungary) Sándor Gombos	(Hungary) Ödön Tersztyánszky	(Hungary) Gyula Glykais
Individual Épée	(France) Georges Buchard	(France) Fernand Jourdant	(Belgium) Xavier de Beukelaer
