= 1935 World Fencing Championships =

International fencing competition

1935 World Championships in Fencing
- Host city: Lausanne, Switzerland

The 1935 World Fencing Championships were held in Lausanne, Switzerland.

== Medal summary ==
=== Men's events ===
Event	Gold	Silver	Bronze
Individual Foil	(France) Edward Gardère	(Kingdom of Italy) Giorgio Bocchino	(Kingdom of Italy) Gustavo Marzi
Team Foil	(Kingdom of Italy) Italy	France	Hungary
Individual Sabre	(Hungary) Aladár Gerevich	(Hungary) Imre Rajczy	(Hungary) László Rajcsányi
Team Sabre	Hungary	(Kingdom of Italy) Italy	Germany
Individual Épée	(Sweden) Hans Drakenberg	(France) Paul Deydier	(Kingdom of Italy) Saverio Ragno
Team Épée	France	Sweden	Germany

=== Women's events ===
Event	Gold	Silver	Bronze
Individual Foil	(Hungary) Ilona Elek	(Austria) Ellen Preis	(Belgium) Jenny Addams
Team Foil	Hungary	Austria	Germany
