= 1931 World Fencing Championships =

International fencing competition

1931 World Championships in Fencing
- Host city: Vienna, Austria

The 1931 World Fencing Championships were held in Vienna, Austria.

== Medal summary ==
=== Men's events ===
Event	Gold	Silver	Bronze
Individual Foil	(France) René Lemoine	(Italy) Gustavo Marzi	(United Kingdom) John Emrys Lloyd
Team Foil	(Kingdom of Italy) Italy	Hungary	Austria
Individual Sabre	(Hungary) György Piller	(Hungary) Endre Kabos	(Hungary) Attila Petschauer
Team Sabre	Hungary	(Kingdom of Italy) Italy	(Weimar Republic) Germany
Individual Épée	(France) Georges Buchard	(France) Bernard Schmetz	(France) Paul Rousset
Team Épée	(Kingdom of Italy) Italy	France	Sweden

=== Women's events ===
Event	Gold	Silver	Bronze
Individual Foil	(Weimar Republic) Helene Mayer	(Hungary) Erna Bogen-Bogáti	(Austria) Ellen Preis
