= 1929 World Fencing Championships =

International fencing competition

1929 World Championships in Fencing
- Host city: (Kingdom of Italy) Naples, Italy

The 1929 World Fencing Championships were held in Naples, Italy.

== Medal summary ==
=== Men's events ===
Event	Gold	Silver	Bronze
Individual Foil	(Kingdom of Italy) Oreste Puliti	(France) Philippe Cattiau	(Kingdom of Italy) Giulio Gaudini
Team Foil	(Kingdom of Italy) Italy	Belgium	Hungary
Individual Sabre	(Hungary) Gyula Glykais	(Kingdom of Italy) Gustavo Marzi	(Hungary) Attila Petschauer
Individual Épée	(France) Philippe Cattiau	(Kingdom of Italy) Marcello Bertinetti	(Kingdom of Italy) Franco Riccardi

=== Women's events ===
Event	Gold	Silver	Bronze
Individual Foil	(Weimar Republic) Helene Mayer	(Netherlands) Johanna de Boer	(Hungary) Margit Danÿ
