= 1950 World Fencing Championships =

International fencing competition

1950 World Championships in Fencing
- Host city: Monte Carlo, Monaco

The 1950 World Fencing Championships were held in Monte Carlo, Monaco.

== Medal table ==
Medal table
Rank	Nation	Gold	Silver	Bronze	Total
1	Italy (ITA)	4	1	2	7
2	France (FRA)	3	4	1	8
3	Denmark (DEN)	1	1	0	2
4	Austria (AUT)	1	0	1	2
5	Sweden (SWE)	0	1	1	2
6	Egypt (EGY)	0	0	2	2
7	Great Britain (GBR)	0	0	1	1
Totals (7 entries)		9	7	8	24

== Medal summary ==
=== Men's events ===
Event	Gold	Silver	Bronze
Individual Foil	(Italy) Renzo Nostini	(France) Jehan Buhan	(France) Jacques Lataste
Team Foil	Italy	France	Egypt
Individual Sabre	(France) Jean Levavasseur	(Italy) Vincenzo Pinton	(Italy) Gastone Darè
Team Sabre	Italy	France	Egypt
Individual Épée	(Denmark) Mogens Lüchow	(Sweden) Carl Forssell	(Italy) Dario Mangiarotti
Team Épée	Italy	France	Sweden

=== Women's events ===
Event	Gold	Silver	Bronze
Individual Foil	(Austria) Ellen Preis	(France) Renée Garilhe	(Austria) Frederika Filz
Team Foil	France	Denmark	(United Kingdom) Great Britain
