= Ryszard Parulski =

Polish fencer (1938–2017)

Personal information
- Born: 9 March 1938 Warsaw, Poland
- Died: 10 January 2017 (aged 78) Warsaw, Poland

Sport
- Sport: Fencing
Medal record
Representing Poland
Olympic Games
Silver medal – second place	1964 Tokyo	Team foil
Bronze medal – third place	1968 Mexico City	Team foil
World Fencing Championships
Gold medal – first place	1961 Turin	Individual oil
Gold medal – first place	1963 Gdańsk	Team épée
Silver medal – second place	1963 Gdańsk	Team foil
Silver medal – second place	1963 Gdańsk	Team foil
Silver medal – second place	1969 Havana	Individual foil
Bronze medal – third place	1961 Turin	Team foil
Bronze medal – third place	1962 Buenos Aires	Team foil
Bronze medal – third place	1966 Moscow	Team foil
Bronze medal – third place	1967 Montreal	Team foil
Bronze medal – third place	1969 Havana	Team foil
Summer Universiade
Gold medal – first place	1963 Porto Alegre	Team épée
Gold medal – first place	1963 Porto Alegre	Team foil
Bronze medal – third place	1959 Turin	Team sabre
Bronze medal – third place	1961 Sofia	Team foil

Ryszard Władysław Parulski (9 March 1938 – 10 January 2017) was a Polish fencer. He won a silver medal in the team foil event at the 1964 Summer Olympics and a bronze in the same event at the 1968 Summer Olympics. He also won gold medals at the 1961 World Fencing Championships and 1963 World Fencing Championships.

A lawyer by civil profession, Parulski served as the vice-chairman of the Polish Olympic Committee from 1990 until 1992. In 1997, he was awarded the Commander's Cross of the Order of Polonia Restituta. In 2017, he was posthumously awarded the Commander's Cross with Star of the Order of Polonia Restituta by President of Poland Andrzej Duda for "outstanding contributions to the promotion and popularization of sport as well as his activism for the Olympic community".
