= 1937 World Fencing Championships =

International fencing competition

1937 World Championships in Fencing
- Host city: Paris, France

The 1937 World Fencing Championships were held in Paris, France.

== Medal table ==
* Host nation (France)

Rank	Nation	Gold	Silver	Bronze	Total
1	Hungary (HUN)	3	2	1	6
2	Italy (ITA)	3	1	0	4
3	France (FRA)*	1	4	1	6
4	Germany (Germany)	1	1	1	3
5	Austria (AUT)	0	0	2	2
6	Belgium (BEL)	0	0	1	1
6	Denmark (DEN)	0	0	1	1
6	Sweden (SWE)	0	0	1	1
Totals (8 entries)		8	8	8	24

== Medal summary ==
=== Men's events ===
Event	Gold	Silver	Bronze
Individual Foil	(Kingdom of Italy) Gustavo Marzi	(France) Edward Gardère	(France) René Lemoine
Team Foil	(Kingdom of Italy) Italy	France	Austria
Individual Sabre	(Hungary) Pál Kovács	(Hungary) Tibor Berczelly	(Hungary) László Rajcsányi
Team Sabre	Hungary	(Kingdom of Italy) Italy	(Nazi Germany) Germany
Individual Épée	(France) Bernard Schmetz	(France) Jacques Coutrot	(Belgium) Robert Stasse
Team Épée	(Kingdom of Italy) Italy	France	Sweden

=== Women's events ===
Event	Gold	Silver	Bronze
Individual Foil	(Nazi Germany) Helene Mayer	(Hungary) Ilona Elek	(Austria) Ellen Preis
Team Foil	Hungary	(Nazi Germany) Germany	Denmark
