= USSR Fencing Federation =

Fencing organisation in the USSR

The USSR Fencing Federation (Russian: Федерация фехтования СССР) was the national organisation for fencing in the USSR. It was affiliated with the International Fencing Federation (FIE) since 1952. The headquarters of the USSR Fencing Federation were in Moscow. The USSR Fencing Federation hosted the 1966 World Fencing Championships.

== Administration ==
=== Board ===
The board consisted of a chairman, a deputy chairman, a secretary, and a treasurer.

== Soviet fencers ==
- Vadim Gutzeit, Ukraine (saber), Olympic champion
- Grigory Kriss, Soviet (épée), Olympic champion, 2x silver
- Maria Mazina, Russia (épée), Olympic champion, bronze
- Mark Midler, Soviet (foil), 2x Olympic champion
- Mark Rakita, Soviet (saber), 2x Olympic champion, 2x silver
- Yakov Rylsky, Soviet (saber), Olympic champion
- Sergey Sharikov, Russia (saber), 2x Olympic champion, silver, bronze
- Viktor Sidyak
- Vladimir Smirnov (1954–1982), Olympic and world champion
- David Tyshler, Soviet (saber), Olympic bronze
- Eduard Vinokurov, Russia (saber), 2x Olympic champion, silver
- Iosif Vitebskiy, Soviet (épée), Olympic silver, 10x national champion
