= 2027 World Fencing Championships =

Sports event in Uzbekistan

- Dates: 20–28 July
- Host city: Tashkent, Uzbekistan

The 2027 World Fencing Championships will be held from 20 to 28 July 2027 in Tashkent, Uzbekistan.

== Medal summary ==
=== Men ===
Event	Gold	Silver	Bronze
Individual épée			
Team épée			
Individual foil			
Team foil			
Individual sabre			
Team sabre			

=== Women ===
Event	Gold	Silver	Bronze
Individual épée			
Team épée			
Individual foil			
Team foil			
Individual sabre			
Team sabre			
