= 1963 World Fencing Championships =

International fencing competition

1963 World Championships in Fencing
- Host city: (Polish People's Republic) Gdańsk, Poland

The 1963 World Fencing Championships were held in Gdańsk, Poland.

== Medal table ==
* Host nation (Poland)

Rank	Nation	Gold	Silver	Bronze	Total
1	Soviet Union (URS)	3	1	1	5
2	Poland (POL)*	2	3	1	6
3	Hungary (HUN)	1	2	3	6
4	France (FRA)	1	2	1	4
5	Austria (AUT)	1	0	0	1
6	Italy (ITA)	0	0	2	2
Totals (6 entries)		8	8	8	24

== Medal summary ==
=== Men's events ===
Event	Gold	Silver	Bronze
Individual Foil	(France) Jean-Claude Magnan	(Polish People's Republic) Ryszard Parulski	(Polish People's Republic) Egon Franke
Team Foil	Soviet Union	(Polish People's Republic) Poland	France
Individual Sabre	(Soviet Union) Yakov Rylsky	(Polish People's Republic) Jerzy Pawłowski	(Italy) Wladimiro Calarese
Team Sabre	(Polish People's Republic) Poland	Soviet Union	(Hungarian People's Republic) Hungary
Individual Épée	(Austria) Roland Losert	(France) Yves Dreyfus	(Soviet Union) Guram Kostava
Team Épée	(Polish People's Republic) Poland	France	(Hungarian People's Republic) Hungary

=== Women's events ===
Event	Gold	Silver	Bronze
Individual Foil	(Hungarian People's Republic) Ildikó Újlaky-Rejtő	(Hungarian People's Republic) Lídia Sákovicsné Dömölky	(Hungarian People's Republic) Katalin Juhász
Team Foil	Soviet Union	(Hungarian People's Republic) Hungary	Italy
