= Christian d'Oriola =

French fencer (1928–2007)

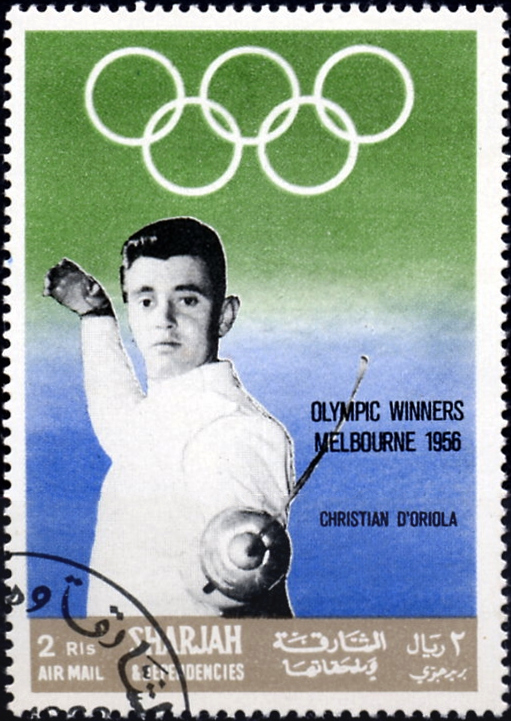
- D'Oriola on a 1968 stamp of Sharjah (United Arab Emirates)

Personal information
- Born: 3 October 1928 Perpignan, France
- Died: 29 October 2007 (aged 79) Nîmes, France
- Height: 1.78 m (5 ft 10 in)
- Weight: 75 kg (165 lb)

Sport
- Sport: Fencing
- Event(s): Foil, épée
Medal record
Representing France
Olympic Games
Gold medal – first place	1948 London	Team foil
Silver medal – second place	1948 London	Individual foil
Gold medal – first place	1952 Helsinki	Individual foil
Gold medal – first place	1952 Helsinki	Team foil
Gold medal – first place	1956 Melbourne	Individual foil
Silver medal – second place	1956 Melbourne	Team foil
World Championships
Gold medal – first place	1947 Lisbon	Individual foil
Gold medal – first place	1947 Lisbon	Team foil
Gold medal – first place	1949 Cairo	Individual foil
Silver medal – second place	1949 Cairo	Team foil
Gold medal – first place	1951 Stockholm	Team foil
Gold medal – first place	1953 Brussels	Individual foil
Gold medal – first place	1953 Brussels	Team foil
Gold medal – first place	1954 Luxembourg	Individual foil
Silver medal – second place	1954 Luxembourg	Team foil
Silver medal – second place	1955 Rome	Individual foil
Gold medal – first place	1958 Philadelphia	Team foil
Mediterranean Games
Gold medal – first place	1951 Alexandria	Individual foil
Gold medal – first place	1955 Barcelona	Individual foil
Gold medal – first place	1955 Barcelona	Team foil
Silver medal – second place	1951 Barcelona	Team foil

Christian d'Oriola (3 October 1928 – 29 October 2007) was a French fencer.

== Career ==
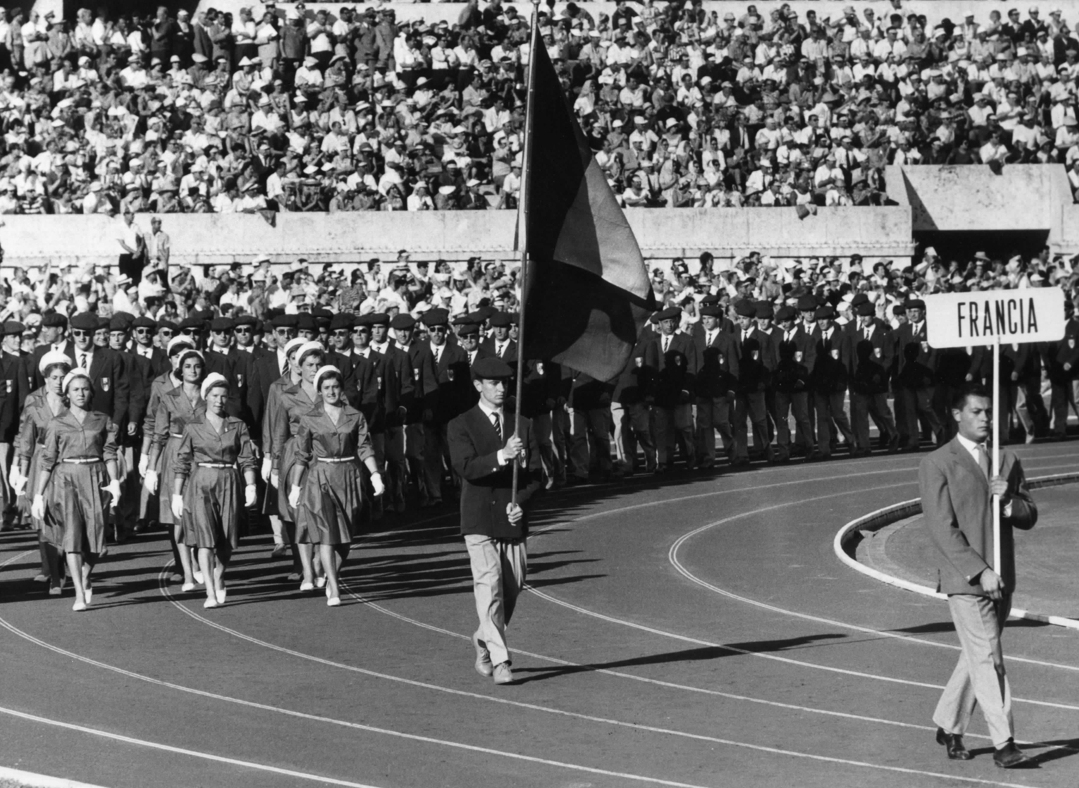
D'Oriola carrying the French flag at the 1960 Olympics

D'Oriola took part in the 1948, 1952, 1956, and 1960 Olympics, serving as the Olympic flag bearer for France in 1960.

Between 1947 and 1958, he won four gold and two silver medals at Summer Olympics and eight world titles in the foil. At the 1960 Olympics, he also competed in the team épée.

He also competed at the Mediterranean Games in 1951 where he won a gold medal in the individual foil event and a silver medal in the team foil event, and in 1955 where he won gold medals in the individual and team foil events. He won the French national title in the team épée event in 1970. In 1972, he was awarded the French Legion of Honor.

After retiring from competitions, D'Oriola acted as a fencing judge and served as vice-president of the French Fencing Federation.

D'Oriola was a cousin of the Olympic equestrian Pierre Jonquères d'Oriola.
