= 1922 World Fencing Championships =

International fencing competition

1922 World Championships in Fencing
- Host city: Paris, France

The 1922 World Fencing Championships were held in Paris, France.

== Medal summary ==
=== Men's events ===
Event	Gold	Silver	Bronze
Individual Épée	(Norway) Raoul Heide	(France) Robert Liottel	(France) Gaston Cornereau
Individual Sabre	(Netherlands) Adrianus de Jong	(France) Maurice Taillandier	(Belgium) Léon Tom
