= 1926 World Fencing Championships =

International fencing competition

1926 World Championships in Fencing
- Host city: Budapest, Hungary; Ostend, Belgium

The 1926 World Fencing Championships were held in Budapest, Hungary, and Ostend, Belgium.

== Medal summary ==
=== Men's events ===
Event	Gold	Silver	Bronze
Individual Foil	(Kingdom of Italy) Giorgio Chiavacci	(Hungary) László Berti	(Kingdom of Italy) Ugo Pignotti
Individual Sabre	(Hungary) Sándor Gombos	(Hungary) Attila Petschauer	(Kingdom of Italy) Bino Bini
Individual Épée	(France) Georges Tainturier	(Belgium) Fernand de Montigny	(Belgium) Léon Tom
