= 1934 World Fencing Championships =

International fencing competition

1934 World Championships in Fencing
- Host city: (Second Polish Republic) Warsaw, Poland

The 1934 World Fencing Championships were held in Warsaw, Poland.

== Medal summary ==
=== Men's events ===
| Event | Gold | Silver | Bronze |
|---|---|---|---|
| Individual Foil | (Kingdom of Italy) Giulio Gaudini | (Kingdom of Italy) Gustavo Marzi | (Kingdom of Italy) Giorgio Bocchino |
| Team Foil | (Kingdom of Italy) Italy | France | Germany |
| Individual Sabre | (Hungary) Endre Kabos | (Kingdom of Italy) Giulio Gaudini | (Hungary) László Rajcsányi |
| Team Sabre | Hungary | (Kingdom of Italy) Italy | (Second Polish Republic) Poland |
| Individual Épée | (Hungary) Pál Dunay | (Sweden) Gustaf Dyrssen | (Sweden) Hans Drakenberg |
| Team Épée | France | (Kingdom of Italy) Italy | Sweden |

=== Women's events ===
| Event | Gold | Silver | Bronze |
|---|---|---|---|
| Individual Foil | (Hungary) Ilona Elek | (Hungary) Margit Elek | (Germany) Hedwig Haß |
| Team Foil | Hungary | Germany | (United Kingdom) Great Britain (Kingdom of Italy) Italy |
