= Ebba Gripenstedt =

Swedish fencer

Personal information
- Born: 3 June 1894 Nynäs Castle, Sweden
- Died: 21 December 1950 (aged 56) Stockholm, Sweden

Sport
- Sport: Fencing
- Club: Stockholms Kvinnliga Fäktklubb

Ebba Gripenstedt (3 June 1894 – 21 December 1950) was a Swedish fencer.

Gripenstedt was born at Nynäs Castle in present Nyköping Municipality and represented Stockholms Kvinnliga Fäktklubb as a fencer. She competed in the women's individual foil events at the 1928 and 1936 Summer Olympics.

Gripenstedt died in Stockholm.

Ebba Gripenstedt was the sister of fencer Carl Gripenstedt.
