= 1925 World Fencing Championships =

International fencing competition

1925 World Championships in Fencing
- Host city: Ostend, Belgium

The 1925 World Fencing Championships were held in Ostend, Belgium.

== Medal summary ==
=== Men's events ===
Event	Gold	Silver	Bronze
Individual sabre	(Hungary) János Garay	(Hungary) Jenő Uhlyárik	(Hungary) Attila Petschauer
