= Maurice Taillandier =

French fencer

Personal information
- Born: 27 January 1881
- Died: 28 December 1932 (aged 51)

Sport
- Sport: Fencing

Maurice Taillandier (27 January 1881 – 28 December 1932) was a French fencer. He competed in the team sabre competition at the 1924 and 1928 Summer Olympics.
