= 1949 World Fencing Championships =

Sporting event

1949 World Championships in Fencing
- Host city: (Kingdom of Egypt) Cairo, Egypt

The 1949 World Fencing Championships were held in Cairo, Egypt.

== Medal table ==
Rank	Nation	Gold	Silver	Bronze	Total
1	Italy (ITA)	5	2	2	9
2	France (FRA)	1	3	1	5
3	Austria (AUT)	1	0	0	1
4	Sweden (SWE)	0	1	1	2
5	Denmark (DEN)	0	1	0	1
6	Egypt (EGY)	0	0	3	3
Totals (6 entries)		7	7	7	21

== Medal summary ==
=== Men's events ===
Event	Gold	Silver	Bronze
Individual Foil	(France) Christian d'Oriola	(Italy) Renzo Nostini	(Italy) Edoardo Mangiarotti
Team Foil	Italy	France	(Kingdom of Egypt) Egypt
Individual Sabre	(Italy) Gastone Darè	(Italy) Giorgio Pellini	(Italy) Vincenzo Pinton
Team Sabre	Italy	France	(Kingdom of Egypt) Egypt
Individual Épée	(Italy) Dario Mangiarotti	(France) René Bougnol	(Sweden) Per Carleson
Team Épée	Italy	Sweden	(Kingdom of Egypt) Egypt

=== Women's events ===
Event	Gold	Silver	Bronze
Individual Foil	(Austria) Ellen Müller-Preis	(Denmark) Karen Lachmann	(France) Jacqueline Baudot
