= 1936 World Fencing Championships =

International fencing competition

1936 World Championships in Fencing
- Host city: (Kingdom of Italy) Sanremo, Italy

The 1936 World Fencing Championships were held in Sanremo, Italy. The championships were for non-Olympic events only.

== Medal summary ==
=== Women's events ===
Event	Gold	Silver	Bronze
Team Foil	(Nazi Germany) Germany	Hungary	Austria
