= 1988 World Fencing Championships =

International fencing competition

1988 World Championships in Fencing
- Host city: Orléans, France

The 1988 World Fencing Championships were held in Orléans, France.

== Medal table ==
* Host nation (France)

Rank	Nation	Gold	Silver	Bronze	Total
1	France (FRA)*	1	2	0	3
2	West Germany (FRG)	1	0	0	1
3	Italy (ITA)	0	0	1	1
3	Sweden (SWE)	0	0	1	1
Totals (4 entries)		2	2	2	6

=== Women's events ===
Event	Gold	Silver	Bronze
Individual Épée	(France) Brigitte Benon	(France) Sophie Moressée-Pichot	(Sweden) Ninni Eglén
Team Épée	(West Germany) Carmen Engert; Eva-Maria Ittner; Sabine Krapf; Renate Riebandt-Kaspar; Ute Schäper	(France) Valérie Devaux; Nathalie Devillers; Sophie Moressée-Pichot; Jacqueline Rodenbach	(Italy) Saba Amendolara; Alessandra Anglesio; Cecilia Salvioli; Elisa Uga; Nathalie Vezzali
