= 1921 World Fencing Championships =

International fencing competition

1921 World Championships in Fencing
- Host city: Paris, France

The 1921 World Fencing Championships were held in Paris, France.

== Medal summary ==
=== Men's events ===
Event	Gold	Silver	Bronze
Individual Épée	(France) Lucien Gaudin	(France) Gaston Cornereau	(Netherlands) Henri Wijnoldy-Daniëls
