= 1932 World Fencing Championships =

International fencing competition

1932 World Championships in Fencing
- Host city: Copenhagen, Denmark

The 1932 World Fencing Championships were held in Copenhagen, Denmark. From 1932 only non-Olympic events were competed for.

== Women's events ==
Event	Gold	Silver	Bronze
Team Foil	Denmark	Austria	(Weimar Republic) Germany
