= 1923 World Fencing Championships =

International fencing competition

1923 World Championships in Fencing
- Host city: The Hague, Netherlands

The 1923 World Fencing Championships were held in The Hague, Netherlands.

== Medal summary ==
=== Men's events ===
Event	Gold	Silver	Bronze
Individual Épée	(Netherlands) Wouter Brouwer	(Netherlands) Adrianus de Jong	(France) Roger Ducret
Individual Sabre	(Netherlands) Adrianus de Jong	(France) Marc Perrodon	(Netherlands) Henri Wijnoldy-Daniëls
