= Hans Drakenberg =

Swedish fencer (1901–1982)

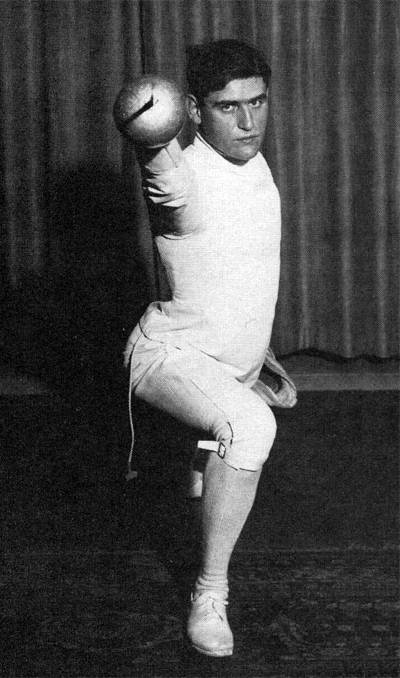
- Hans Drakenberg by the mid-1930s

Personal information
- Nationality: Swedish
- Born: 4 February 1901 Stockholm, Sweden
- Died: 1 November 1982 (aged 81) Malmö, Sweden

Sport
- Country: Sweden
- Sport: Fencing
- Club: Malmö FK 1919
Medal record
Representing Sweden
Olympic Games
Silver medal – second place	1936 Berlin	Épée, team
World Championships
Bronze medal – third place	1933 Budapest	Épée, team
Bronze medal – third place	1934 Warsaw	Épée, ind.
Bronze medal – third place	1934 Warsaw	Épée, team
Gold medal – first place	1935 Lausanne	Épée, ind.
Silver medal – second place	1935 Lausanne	Épée, team
Bronze medal – third place	1937 Paris	Épée, team
Bronze medal – third place	1938 Piešťany	Épée, team
Silver medal – second place	1949 Cairo	Épée, team

Hans Drakenberg (4 February 1901 – 1 November 1982) was a Swedish épée fencer. He won a silver medal in the team event at the 1936 Summer Olympics and finished fourth individually. Drakenberg won an individual European title in 1935 and two silver and five bronze medals at European and world championships in 1933–49. In 1935 he was awarded the Svenska Dagbladet Gold Medal.

== Awards and decorations ==
- (Sweden) Swedish Fencing Federation Honorary Shield (Svenska fäktförbundets hederssköld) (1973)
