= 1933 World Fencing Championships =

International fencing competition

1933 World Championships in Fencing
- Host city: Budapest, Hungary

The 1933 World Fencing Championships were held in Budapest, Hungary.

== Medal summary ==
=== Men's events ===
Event	Gold	Silver	Bronze
Individual Foil	(Kingdom of Italy) Gioacchino Guaragna	(Kingdom of Italy) Giulio Gaudini	(United Kingdom) John Emrys Lloyd
Team Foil	(Kingdom of Italy) Italy	Austria	Hungary
Individual Sabre	(Hungary) Endre Kabos	(Kingdom of Italy) Gustavo Marzi	(Kingdom of Italy) Giulio Gaudini
Team Sabre	Hungary	(Kingdom of Italy) Italy	(United Kingdom) Great Britain
Individual Épée	(France) Georges Buchard	(Kingdom of Italy) Saverio Ragno	(France) Bernard Schmetz
Team Épée	(Kingdom of Italy) Italy	France	Sweden

=== Women's events ===
Event	Gold	Silver	Bronze
Individual Foil	(United Kingdom) Gwendoline Neligan	(Hungary) Erna Bogen-Bogáti	(Denmark) Mitzi With
Team Foil	Hungary	(United Kingdom) Great Britain	Austria
