= 1954 World Fencing Championships =

International fencing competition

1954 World Championships in Fencing
- Host city: Luxembourg City, Luxembourg

The 1954 World Fencing Championships were held in Luxembourg City, in southern Luxembourg.

== Medal table ==
Rank	Nation	Gold	Silver	Bronze	Total
1	Italy (ITA)	3	3	2	8
2	Hungary (HUN)	3	2	2	7
3	France (FRA)	1	1	4	6
4	Denmark (DNK)	1	0	0	1
5	Poland (POL)	0	1	0	1
5	Sweden (SWE)	0	1	0	1
Totals (6 entries)		8	8	8	24

== Medal summary ==
=== Men's events ===
Event	Gold	Silver	Bronze
Épée	(Italy) Edoardo Mangiarotti	(Italy) Carlo Pavesi	(Italy) Franco Bertinetti
Foil	(France) Christian d'Oriola	(Italy) Edoardo Mangiarotti	(Italy) Giancarlo Bergamini
Sabre	(Hungary) Rudolf Kárpáti	(Hungary) Pál Kovács	(Hungary) Tibor Berczelly
Team Épée	Italy	Sweden	France
Team Foil	Italy	France	Hungary
Team Sabre	Hungary	Poland	France

=== Women's events ===
Event	Gold	Silver	Bronze
Foil	(Denmark) Karen Lachmann	(Hungary) Ilona Elek	(France) Renée Garilhe
Team Foil	Hungary	Italy	France
