= 1966 World Fencing Championships =

International fencing competition

1966 World Championships in Fencing
- Host city: Moscow, Soviet Union

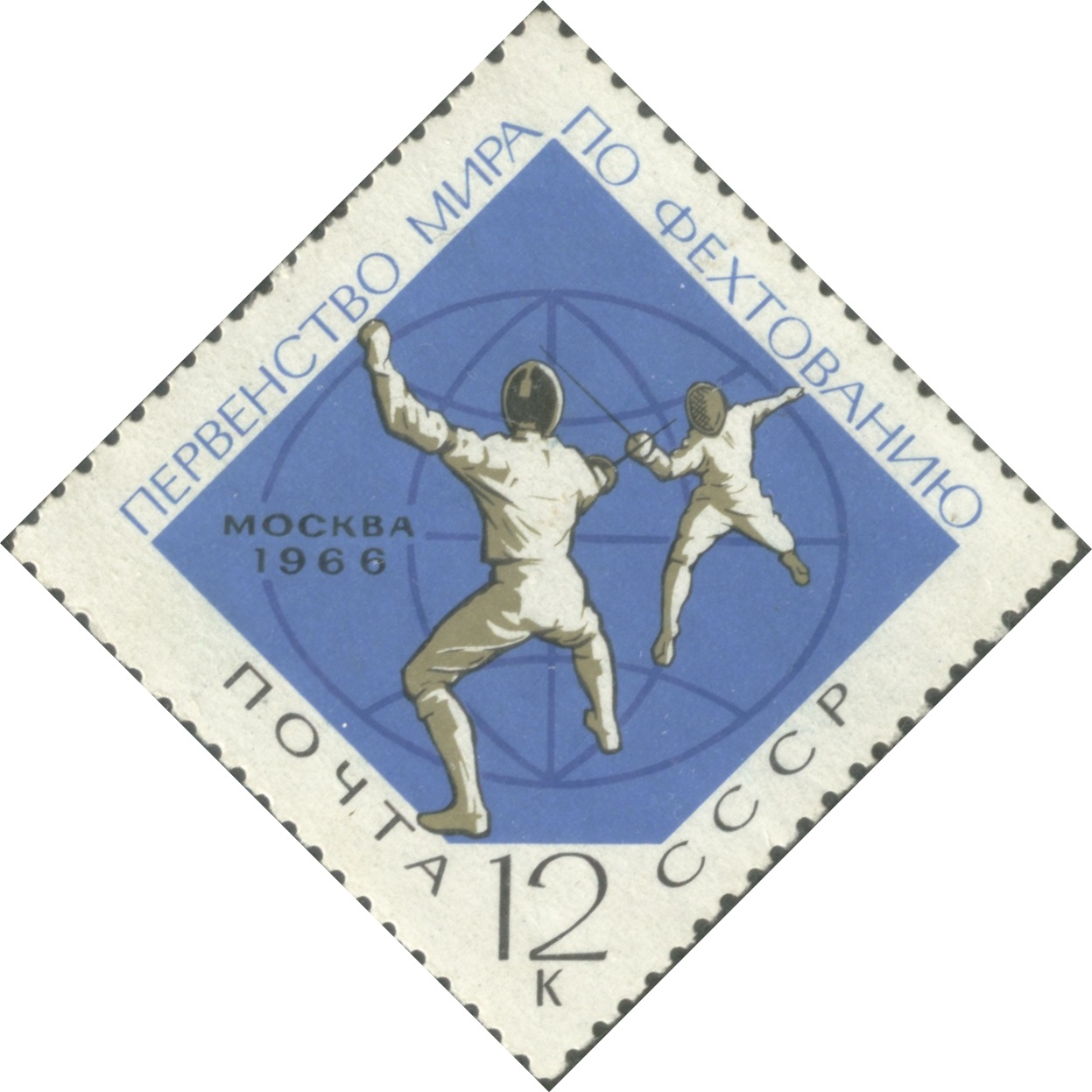
A Soviet stamp dedicated to the 1966 World Fencing Championships

The 1966 World Fencing Championships were held in Moscow, Russian SFSR, Soviet Union. The event took place from July 6 to July 16, 1966. They were organized by the USSR Fencing Federation.

== Medal table ==
* Host nation (Soviet Union)

Rank	Nation	Gold	Silver	Bronze	Total
1	Soviet Union (URS)*	5	3	2	10
2	Hungary (HUN)	1	3	1	5
3	France (FRA)	1	2	2	5
4	Poland (POL)	1	0	2	3
5	Sweden (SWE)	0	0	1	1
Totals (5 entries)		8	8	8	24

== Medal summary ==
=== Men's events ===
Event	Gold	Silver	Bronze
Individual Foil	(Soviet Union) German Sveshnikov	(France) Jean-Claude Magnan	(Soviet Union) Viktor Putyatin
Team Foil	Soviet Union	(Hungarian People's Republic) Hungary	(Polish People's Republic) Poland
Individual Sabre	(Polish People's Republic) Jerzy Pawłowski	(Hungarian People's Republic) Tibor Pézsa	(Hungarian People's Republic) Zoltán Horváth
Team Sabre	(Hungarian People's Republic) Hungary	Soviet Union	France
Individual Épée	(Soviet Union) Aleksey Nikanchikov	(France) Claude Bourquard	(Polish People's Republic) Bohdan Gonsior
Team Épée	France	Soviet Union	Sweden

=== Women's events ===
Event	Gold	Silver	Bronze
Individual Foil	(Soviet Union) Tatyana Petrenko-Samusenko	(Soviet Union) Alexandra Zabelina	(Soviet Union) Galina Gorokhova
Team Foil	Soviet Union	(Hungarian People's Republic) Hungary	France
