= French Fencing Federation =

- Sport: Fencing
- Jurisdiction: France
- Abbreviation: FFE
- Founded: 1906
- Affiliation: FIE
- Regional affiliation: EFC
- President: Bruno Gares
- Director: Sylvie Le Maux

Official website
- www.escrime-ffe.fr
- (France)

The French Fencing Federation (French: Fédération Française d'Escrime - FFE) is the national governing body for fencing in France. It is affiliated with the International Fencing Federation. The president is Bruno Gares, and the treasurer is Sylvie Sormail. The organisation was founded in 1906, and has its headquarters in Noisy-Le-Grand.

== French fencers ==
- Philippe Boisse, épée, vice president of the French Fencing Federation
- Yves Dreyfus, épée, Olympic bronze, French champion
- Alexandre Lippmann, épée, 2x Olympic champion, 2x silver, bronze
- Armand Mouyal, épée, Olympic bronze, world champion
- Claude Netter, foil, Olympic champion, silver
- Eric Srecki, épée, Olympic and World champion
- Jean Stern, épée, Olympic champion
- Romain Cannone, épée, Olympic champion
- Anne-Lise Touya, sabre
- Damien Touya, sabre
