= 1952 World Fencing Championships =

International fencing competition

1952 World Championships in Fencing
- Host city: Copenhagen, Denmark

The 1952 World Fencing Championships were held in Copenhagen, Denmark. The championships were for non-Olympic events only.

== Medal table ==
Rank	Nation	Gold	Silver	Bronze	Total
1	Hungary (HUN)	1	0	0	1
2	France (FRA)	0	1	0	1
3	Italy (ITA)	0	0	1	1
Totals (3 entries)		1	1	1	3

=== Women's events ===
Event	Gold	Silver	Bronze
Team Foil	Hungary	France	Italy
