= Sándor Gombos =

Hungarian fencer (1895–1968)

Olympic medal record

Representing Hungary

Men's Fencing
Gold medal – first place	1928 Amsterdam	Team sabre

Sandor Gombos

Dr. Sándor Gombos (December 4, 1895 – January 27, 1968, in Zombor, Kingdom of Hungary) was a Hungarian Olympic champion sabre fencer.

== Early and personal life ==
Gombos was born in Zombor, Kingdom of Hungary, and was Jewish.

== Fencing career ==
Gombos was a member of the Nemzeti Vivo Club (NVC), as well as of the Istvan Tisza Fencing Club which he founded in 1925.

=== Hungarian Championship ===
Gombos was the Hungarian sabre champion in 1930.

=== European Championships ===
At the European Championships (predecessor to the World Championships), Gombos won gold medals in Individual Sabre at the 1926, 1927, 1930, and 1931 events and gold medals in Team Sabre at the 1930 and 1931 events.

=== Olympics ===
He won a gold medal in Team Sabre at the 1928 Summer Olympics in Amsterdam, in which the Hungarian team went undefeated. He finished in fifth place in Individual Sabre, winning 8 of his 11 matches.

== Miscellaneous ==
Gombos fought a duel in 1937 with a fencing instructor, which was reported in the Hungarian press.

== Hall of Fame ==
Gombos, who was Jewish, was inducted into the International Jewish Sports Hall of Fame in 1997.

== See also ==
- List of select Jewish fencers
- List of Jewish Olympic medalists
