= 1956 World Fencing Championships =

International fencing competition

1956 World Championships in Fencing
- Host city: London, England

The 1956 World Fencing Championships were held in London, England, United Kingdom. The championships were for non-Olympic events only.

== Medal table ==
Rank	Nation	Gold	Silver	Bronze	Total
1	Soviet Union (URS)	1	0	0	1
2	France (FRA)	0	1	0	1
3	Hungary (HUN)	0	0	1	1
Totals (3 entries)		1	1	1	3

== Medal summary ==
=== Women's events ===
Event	Gold	Silver	Bronze
Team Foil	Soviet Union	France	Hungary
