= 1955 World Fencing Championships =

International fencing competition

1955 World Championships in Fencing
- Host city: Rome, Italy

The 1955 World Fencing Championships were held in Rome, Italy.

== Medal table ==
* Host nation (Italy)

Rank	Nation	Gold	Silver	Bronze	Total
1	Hungary (HUN)	5	2	2	9
2	Italy (ITA)*	3	3	3	9
3	France (FRA)	0	3	1	4
4	Great Britain (GBR)	0	0	1	1
4	Soviet Union (URS)	0	0	1	1
Totals (5 entries)		8	8	8	24

== Medal summary ==
=== Men's events ===
Event	Gold	Silver	Bronze
Individual Foil	(Hungary) József Gyuricza	(France) Christian d'Oriola	(France) Jacques Lataste
Team Foil	Italy	Hungary	(United Kingdom) Great Britain
Individual Sabre	(Hungary) Aladár Gerevich	(Hungary) Rudolf Kárpáti	(Italy) Renzo Nostini
Team Sabre	Hungary	Italy	Soviet Union
Individual Épée	(Italy) Giorgio Anglesio	(Italy) Franco Bertinetti	(Italy) Carlo Pavesi
Team Épée	Italy	France	Hungary

=== Women's events ===
Event	Gold	Silver	Bronze
Individual Foil	(Hungary) Lídia Sákovicsné Dömölky	(Italy) Bruna Colombetti-Peroncini	(Hungary) Ilona Elek
Team Foil	Hungary	France	Italy
