= Ellen Preis =

Austrian fencer

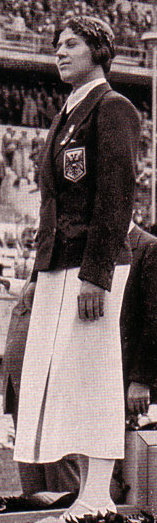

Personal information
- Born: 6 May 1912 Charlottenburg, Berlin, Germany
- Died: 18 November 2007 (aged 95) Vienna, Austria

Sport
- Sport: Fencing
- Club: Fechtsaal Werdnik, Wien; Union Fechtclub, Wien
Medal record
Representing Austria
Olympic Games
Gold medal – first place	1932 Los Angeles	Individual foil
Bronze medal – third place	1936 Berlin	Individual foil
Bronze medal – third place	1948 London	Individual foil

Ellen Müller-Preis (née Preis; 6 May 1912 – 18 November 2007) was a German-born Austrian Olympic-champion foil fencer.

In 1949, she was named Austrian female athlete of the year.

== Fencing career ==
Preis was born in Berlin, and was Jewish. She moved to Vienna at the age of 18 in 1930, and began receiving fencing instruction from her aunt. In under two years she came in third in the European Championships in Vienna. She later married Dr. Müller and had two sons and a daughter, who died from whooping cough.

=== World and National Championships ===
She won three world championships (1947, 1949, and 1950) and numerous national Austrian titles (17). In 1949 Müller-Preis was named the first ever "Austrian Female Athlete of the Year."

At one point, Prof. Müller-Preis was credited in the Guinness Book of World Records as the female with the longest Olympic span of any woman, competing from 1932 until 1956. The record has since been broken. Two Olympic Games were cancelled at that time due to World War II, 1940 and 1944.

=== Olympics ===
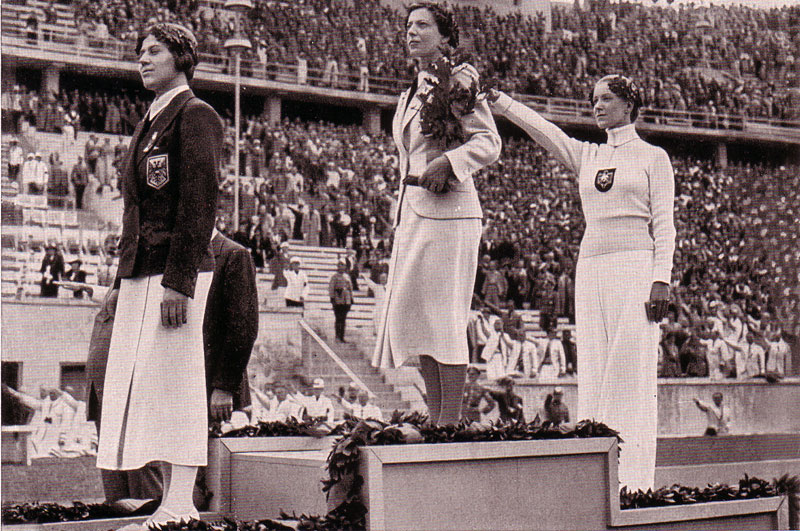
Preis (left) at the 1936 Summer Olympics

As a German/Austrian dual citizen, she wanted to fence for Germany in the 1932 Los Angeles Olympics but was rejected by the German Federation. She then fenced in those Olympics for Austria, beating Heather Judy Guinness of England for the gold medal. At both the 1936 Berlin Olympics and the 1948 London Olympics, she won bronze medals.

In the 1936 Berlin Olympics, Preis was one of a number of Jewish athletes who won medals. In the individual women's foil competition, all three medals were won by Jewish women who are counted among the greatest women fencers of the 20th century. Ilona Elek, known also as Ilona Elek-Schacherer, from Hungary won gold. Elek defeated a German with a Jewish father, Helene Mayer, gold medalist at the 1928 Summer Olympics in Amsterdam, one of only two Jews allowed to compete for Germany by the Nazis, who admitted her under threat of boycott by the US. Mayer caused controversy by giving the Nazi salute on the medal stand while accepting the silver medal.

In 1956, at the age of 44, Preis reached the final round at the Melbourne Olympics and came in seventh.

== Later life ==
After retiring from fencing, she was Professor Emeritus of the Universität für Musik and darstellende Kunst (University of Music and Performing Arts Vienna) in Vienna, taught at the Max Reinhardt Seminar, and coached at the Openstudio of the Vienna Staatsoper and the Burgtheater. She worked as a consultant, ensuring that fencing performed in plays was properly done.

Ellen Müller-Preis died on 18 November 2007 in Vienna of kidney failure.

== See also ==
- List of select Jewish fencers
- List of Jewish Olympic medalists
