= Helene Mayer =

German fencer (1910–1953)

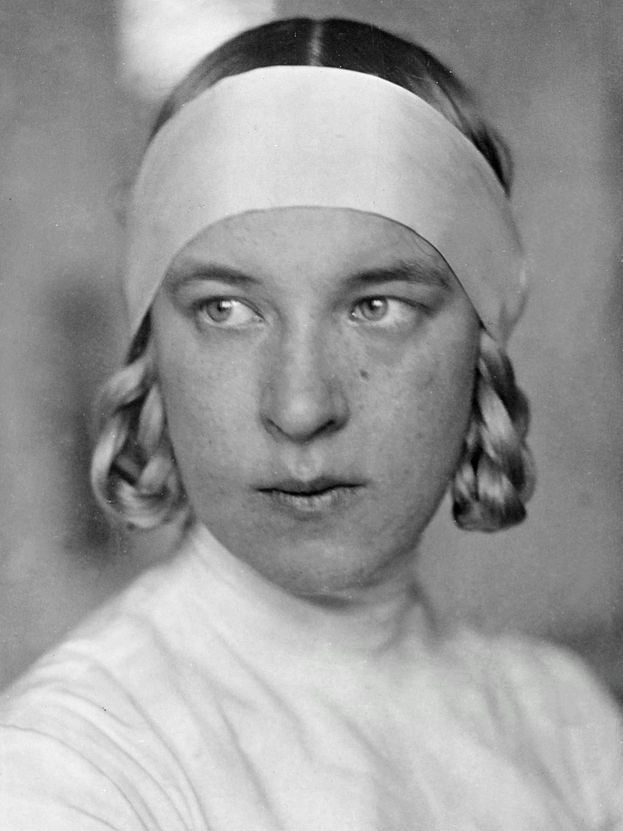
- Mayer in 1928

Personal information
- Full name: Helene Julie Mayer
- Born: 20 December 1910 Offenbach am Main, Germany
- Died: 10 October 1953 (aged 42) Heidelberg, West Germany
- Height: 5 ft 9 in (175 cm)
- Weight: 155 lb (70 kg)

Fencing career
- Sport: Fencing
- Country: Germany; Germany; United States
- Club: FC Hermannia
Medal record
Olympic Games
Representing Germany
Gold medal – first place	1928 Amsterdam	Individual foil
Representing Nazi Germany
Silver medal – second place	1936 Berlin	Individual foil

Helene Julie Mayer (20 December 1910 – 10 October 1953) was a German fencer who won the gold medal at the 1928 Olympics in Amsterdam, and the silver medal at the 1936 Olympics in Berlin. She competed for Nazi Germany in Berlin, despite having been forced to leave Germany in 1935 and resettle in the United States because she was of Jewish descent. She studied at American universities, and later returned to Germany in 1952 where she died of breast cancer.

Mayer had been called the greatest female fencer of all time, and was named by Sports Illustrated as one of the Top 100 Female Athletes of the 20th Century, but her legacy remains clouded. At the Olympics in Berlin, where she was the only German athlete of Jewish origin to win a medal, she gave the Nazi salute during the medal ceremony and later said it might have protected her family that was in labor camps in Germany. Some consider her a traitor and opportunist, while others consider her a tragic figure who was used not only by Nazi Germany but by the International Olympic Committee to prevent a boycott of the Games.

After the Olympics, she returned to the United States and became a nine-time U.S. champion. She received citizenship in 1941 but returned to Germany in 1952. Mayer died the following year, leaving few interviews and little correspondence.

== Family and early life ==
Mayer was born in Offenbach am Main, a city close to Frankfurt. Her mother lda Anna Bertha (née Becker) was Lutheran, and her father Ludwig Karl Mayer, a physician, was Jewish and was born in 1876. Emmanuel Mayer, her paternal great-grandfather, and Jule Weissman, his wife, were the parents of Martin Mayer, her paternal grandfather who was born in 1841 and who married Rosalie Hamburg, her paternal grandmother.

Mayer was the subject of the book Foiled: Hitler's Jewish Olympian: the Helene Mayer Story (RDR Books, 2002), which focused on how "the Nazis brought Mayer home from self-imposed exile in California to be the token Jew on their team." Her birth certificate listed her as "Israelitischen"; as Jewish. As a child, she was called the "Jewish Mayer", to distinguish her from the "Christian Mayer", a child who lived next door to her, as was reported by the press of the time. In January 1933, the Offenbach Fencing Club rescinded her membership on the basis of new Nazi legislation banning Jews. Her ethnic identity reportedly did not become an issue until the Nazi Party rose to power in the early 1930s.

== Fencing career ==
Mayer was only 13 when she won the German women's foil championship in 1924. Her technique and talent were spectacular, according to fencing experts who have seen footage of her fencing. By 1930, she had won six German championships.

=== Olympics ===
Mayer won a gold medal in fencing at the age of 17 at the 1928 Summer Olympics in Amsterdam, representing Germany, winning 18 bouts and losing only 2. She became a national hero in Germany and was celebrated, with her photo plastered everywhere. According to a profile in The Guardian, "She was tall, blonde, elegant and vivacious."

In 1931, her father died of a heart attack. She finished fifth at the 1932 Summer Olympics in Los Angeles, having learned, two hours prior to the match, that her boyfriend had died in a military training exercise in Germany. She then remained in the U.S. to study for two years as an exchange student at Scripps College, earning a certificate in social work in 1934. She later studied towards a master's degree at the University of California at Berkeley, and fenced for the USC Fencing Club. She hoped to join the German diplomatic corps.

After Hitler came to power in 1933, anti-Jewish laws put in place nearly ended her career. Her membership at her German fencing club was terminated, as was her study exchange. She found work teaching German at Mills College in Oakland, California, and later taught at San Francisco City College. She was stripped of her citizenship in Germany in 1935 by the Nuremberg Laws, which considered her non-German.

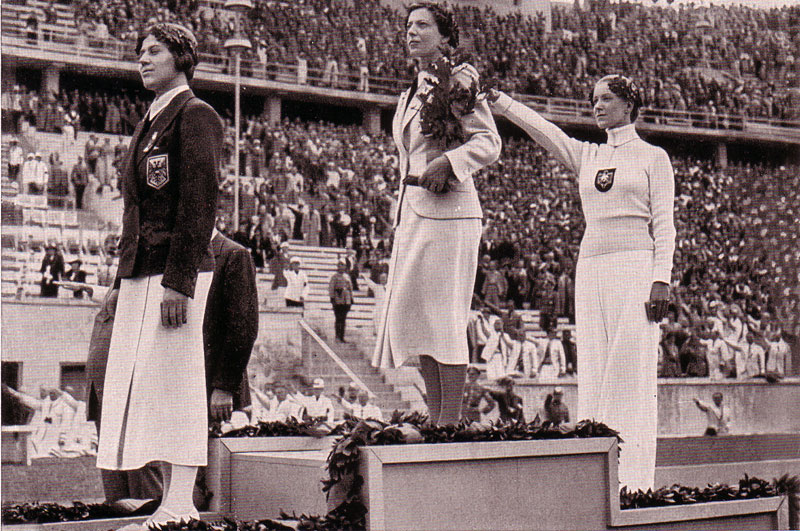
Mayer giving the Nazi salute at the 1936 Summer Olympics

She accepted an invitation to compete for Germany at the 1936 Summer Olympics, held in Berlin. Joseph Goebbels required of the press that "no comments may be made regarding Helene Mayer's non-Aryan ancestry". She achieved a silver medal in individual women's foil. She gave a Nazi salute on the podium, and later said it might have protected her family that was still in Germany, in labor camps.

=== International competitions ===
In 1928, she won the Italian national championship. She was the European champion in 1929 and 1931. She was World Foil Champion in 1929–31 and 1937.

=== US competitions ===
Ultimately, she settled in the United States and had a successful fencing career, winning the US women's foil championship 8 times from 1934 to 1946 (1934, 1935, 1937, 1938, 1939, 1941, 1942, and 1946).

In 1938, she won the Amateur Fencers League of America's San Francisco Division men's title; however, two days later, she was stripped of the title, as the League adopted a rule banning competition between women and men, stating that since fencing involved physical contact, "a chivalrous man found it difficult to do his worst when he faced a woman." The restriction was later lifted in the 1950s.

== Return to Germany and death ==
In 1952, Mayer returned to Germany, where she married an old friend, Erwin Falkner von Sonnenburg, in a quiet May ceremony in Munich. The couple moved to the hills above Stuttgart before settling in Heidelberg where she died of breast cancer in October 1953, at age 42.

== Legacy ==
Mayer was named one of the top 100 female athletes of the 20th century by Sports Illustrated. She was inducted into the USFA Hall of Fame in 1963.

== Accomplishments ==
- 1924: German Foil Champion
- 1925: German Foil Champion
- 1926: German Foil Champion
- 1927: German Foil Champion
- 1928: German Foil Champion
  - Olympic gold medal, Foil, German Team
  - Winner Foil, Italian National Championships
- 1929: German Foil Champion
  - World Foil Champion
- 1930: German Foil Champion
- 1931: World Foil Champion
- 1932: German Olympic Foil Team
- 1933: U.S. Foil Champion (outdoors)
- 1934: U.S. Foil Champion
- 1935: U.S. Foil Champion
- 1936: Olympic silver medal, Foil, German Team
- 1937: U.S. Foil Champion
  - World Foil Champion
- 1938: U.S. Foil Champion
- 1939: U.S. Foil Champion
- 1941: U.S. Foil Champion
- 1942: U.S. Foil Champion
- 1946: U.S. Foil Champion

== See also ==
- List of select Jewish fencers
- List of Jewish Olympic medalists
- Helene-Mayer-Ring
- List of USFA Division I National Champions
