= Budapesti VSC (fencing) =

Hungarian fencing team

- Founded: 1949
- Based in: Budapest, Hungary
- Arena: Szőnyi úti Vívócsarnok
- Colors: blue and yellow
- Chairman: Kristóf Szatmáry
- Manager: Dominika Honti-Kiss; Iván Kovács
- Website: bvsc.hu

Budapesti VSC created a fencing section in 1949, which had one of the most successful teams in Hungary.

== Achievements ==
Competition	(gold) Gold	(silver) Silver	(bronze) Bronze	Total
Summer Olympic Games	8	11	6	25
World Championships	36			
European Championships	10			
Universiade and World Universiade Summer Games				
World Cup				
European Cup				

== Fencing Hall ==
- Name: Szőnyi utcai Vívócsarnok
- City: Budapest, Hungary
- Address: H-1142 Budapest, XIV. district, Szőnyi út 2. II. em.

== International success ==
=== Olympic medalists ===
The team's olympic medalists are shown below.

Games	Medal	Category	Name
(Finland) 1952 Helsinki	Silver	Foil, women's individual	Ilona Elek
(Australia) 1956 Melbourne	Gold	Sabre, men's team	Attila Keresztes; A. Gerevich, R. Kárpáti, J. Hámori, P. Kovács, D. Magay
(Italy) 1960 Rome	Gold	Sabre, men's team	Tamás Mendelényi; R. Kárpáti, P. Kovács, Z. Horváth, G. Delneky, A. Gerevich
(Italy) 1960 Rome	Silver	Foil, women's team	Györgyi Marvalics, Magdolna Nyári; I. Rejtő, K. Juhász, L. Dömölky
(Japan) 1964 Tokyo	Gold	Foil, women's team	Judit Ágoston; P. Marosi, K. Juhász, L. Dömölky, I. Rejtő
1968 Mexico City	Gold	Épée, men's team	Csaba Fenyvesi; Z. Nemere, P. Schmitt, Gy. Kulcsár, P. B.Nagy
1968 Mexico City	Silver	Foil, men's individual	Jenő Kamuti
1968 Mexico City	Silver	Foil, women's team	Ildikó Bóbis; L. Dömölky, I. Rejtő, M. Gulácsy, P. Marosi
(West Germany) 1972 Munich	Gold	Épée, men's individual	Csaba Fenyvesi
(West Germany) 1972 Munich	Gold	Épée, men's team	Sándor Erdős, Csaba Fenyvesi; Gy. Kulcsár, P. Schmitt, I. Osztrics
(West Germany) 1972 Munich	Silver	Foil, men's individual	Jenő Kamuti
(West Germany) 1972 Munich	Silver	Foil, women's individual	Ildikó Bóbis
(West Germany) 1972 Munich	Silver	Foil, women's team	Ildikó Bóbis; I. Rejtő, I. Tordasi, M. Szolnoki, I. Rónay
(West Germany) 1972 Munich	Bronze	Sabre, men's team	Pál Gerevich; T. Kovács, P. Marót, T. Pézsa, P. Bakonyi
(Canada) 1976 Montreal	Bronze	Foil, women's team	Ildikó Bóbis, Magda Maros; I. Tordasi, I. Rejtő, E. Kovács
(Soviet Union) 1980 Moscow	Silver	Foil, women's individual	Magda Maros
(Soviet Union) 1980 Moscow	Bronze	Foil, women's team	Magda Maros; E. Kovács, I. Tordasi, Zs. Szőcs, G. Stefanek
(Soviet Union) 1980 Moscow	Bronze	Sabre, men's team	Pál Gerevich; I. Gedővári, R. Nébald, Gy. Nébald, F. Hammang
(South Korea) 1988 Seoul	Bronze	Foil, men's team	Zsolt Érsek; I. Szelei, I. Busa, R. Gátai, P. Szekeres
(Spain) 1992 Barcelona	Silver	Épée, men's team	Ferenc Hegedűs; I. Kovács, K. Kulcsár, E. Kolczonay, G. Totola
(Greece) 2004 Athens	Silver	Épée, men's team	Iván Kovács; G. Boczkó, K. Kulcsár, G. Imre

=== World Championships ===
Year	Category	Name
1951	Foil, women's individual	Ilona Elek
1952	Foil, women's team	Ilona Elek, Margit Elek, Magdolna Nyári-Kovács
1953	Épée, men's individual	József Sákovics
1953	Foil, women's team	Katalin Kiss
1954	Sabre, men's team	Dániel Magay
1954	Foil, women's team	Katalin Kiss, Magdolna Nyári-Kovács
1955	Sabre, men's team	Attila Keresztes
1955	Foil, women's team	Katalin Kiss, Magdolna Nyári-Kovács
1957	Foil, men's team	Jenő Kamuti, Ferenc Czvikovszky
1957	Sabre, men's team	Tamás Mendelényi
1958	Sabre, men's team	Tamás Mendelényi
1959	Foil, women's team	Magdolna Nyári-Kovács, Györgyi Marvalics-Székely
1962	Foil, women's team	Magdolna Nyári-Kovács
1967	Foil, women's team	Ildikó Farkasinszky-Bóbis
1970	Épée, men's team	Csaba Fenyvesi, Sándor Erdős
1971	Épée, men's team	Csaba Fenyvesi
1973	Sabre, men's team	Pál Gerevich
1973	Foil, women's team	Ildikó Farkasinszky-Bóbis, Magda Maros
1974	Foil, women's individual	Ildikó Farkasinszky-Bóbis
1977	Sabre, men's individual	Pál Gerevich
1978	Épée, men's team	Csaba Fenyvesi, Jenő Pap
1978	Sabre, men's team	Pál Gerevich
1982	Épée, men's individual	Jenő Pap
1998	Épée, men's team	Attila Fekete
2001	Épée, men's team	Iván Kovács, Attila Fekete
2002	Épée, women's team	Hajnalka Tóth

=== European Championships ===
Year	Category	Name
1991	Foil, men's individual	Zsolt Érsek
1991	Foil, men's team	Zsolt Érsek
1998	Épée, men's team	Attila Fekete
2001	Épée, women's team	Hajnalka Tóth
2002	Épée, women's team	Hajnalka Tóth
2006	Épée, men's individual	Iván Kovács
2006	Épée, men's team	Iván Kovács, Attila Fekete
2007	Épée, men's team	Iván Kovács
2010	Épée, men's team	Tamás Pádár

== Notable former fencers ==
Sabre

- Dániel Magay
- Attila Keresztes
- Tamás Mendelényi
- Pál Gerevich

Épée

- József Sákovics
- Csaba Fenyvesi
- Jenő Pap
- Sándor Erdős
- Attila Fekete
- Hajnalka Tóth
- Iván Kovács
- Tamás Pádár

Foil

- Ilona Elek
- Margit Elek
- Magdolna Nyári-Kovács
- Katalin Kiss
- Judit Ágoston-Mendelényi
- Jenő Kamuti
- Ferenc Czvikovszky
- Györgyi Marvalics-Székely
- Ildikó Farkasinszky-Bóbis
- Magda Maros
- Zsolt Érsek

== See also ==
- Hungarian Fencer of the Year
