= Budapesti Honvéd SE (fencing) =

- Full name: Budapesti Honvéd Sportegyesület
- Short name: BHSE
- Founded: 1950; 76 years ago (parent club in 1949)
- Based in: Budapest, Hungary
- Arena: Tüzér utcai Vívócsarnok
- Colors: Red and white
- Chairman: dr. István Simicskó; István Gergely (executive)
- Head coach: Edina Knapek
- Website: Club home page

Budapesti Honvéd SE created a fencing section in 1950, which had one of the most successful teams in Hungary.

== Achievements ==
Competition	(gold) Gold	(silver) Silver	(bronze) Bronze	Total
Summer Olympic Games	10	7	11	28
World Championships	47			
European Championships	22			
Universiade and World Universiade Summer Games				
World Cup				
European Cup				

== Current squad ==
=== Technical and Managerial Staff ===
Fencing team officials according to the official website:

Name	Nat.	Job
Edina Knapek	(Hungary)	Branch Director
Róbert Steiner	(Hungary)	Support Officer
Tamás Dancsházy-Nagy	(Hungary)	Head coach
Péter Babos	(Hungary)	Coach, foli, épée
István Budai	(Hungary)	Coach, épée
Dóra Deli	(Hungary)	Coach, foil
Ferenc Dierra	(Hungary)	Coach, épée
Tibor Kiss	(Hungary)	MOB Special coach, foil
Marco Gonçalves	(Portugal)	MOB Special coach, foil
Nándor Rózsavári	(Hungary)	Coach, foil
Péter Somfai	(Hungary)	Junior coach, épée
Ádám Steiner	(Hungary)	Junior coach, foil
Géza Imre	(Hungary)	Junior coach, épée
Tibor Krámer	(Hungary)	Gunsmith

=== Athletes ===
==== Men's squad ====
- Gábor Boczkó
- Géza Imre
- Péter Somfai

==== Women's squad ====
- Dorina Budai
- Edina Knapek
- Gabriella Varga
- Katalin Varga

== Fencing Hall ==
- Name: Tüzér utcai Vívócsarnok
- City: Budapest, Hungary
- Address: H-1134 Budapest, XIII. district, Dózsa György út 55.

== International success ==
=== Olympic medalists ===
The team's olympic medalists are shown below.

Games	Medal	Category	Name
(Finland) 1952 Helsinki	Gold	Sabre, men's team	Bertalan Papp, Rudolf Kárpáti; L. Rajcsányi, T. Berczelly, A. Gerevich, P. Kovács
(Finland) 1952 Helsinki	Bronze	Foil, men's team	Lajos Maszlay; E. Palócz, T. Berczelly, E. Tilli, A. Gerevich, J. Sákovics
(Australia) 1956 Melbourne	Gold	Sabre, men's individual	Rudolf Kárpáti
(Australia) 1956 Melbourne	Gold	Sabre, men's team	Rudolf Kárpáti; A. Keresztes, A. Gerevich, J. Hámori, P. Kovács, D. Magay
(Italy) 1960 Rome	Gold	Sabre, men's individual	Rudolf Kárpáti
(Italy) 1960 Rome	Gold	Sabre, men's team	Rudolf Kárpáti; T. Mendelényi, P. Kovács, Z. Horváth, G. Delneky, A. Gerevich
(Japan) 1964 Tokyo	Gold	Sabre, men's individual	Tibor Pézsa
1968 Mexico City	Silver	Foil, women's team	Mária Gulácsy; L. Dömölky, I. Bóbis, I. Rejtő, P. Marosi
1968 Mexico City	Bronze	Sabre, men's individual	Tibor Pézsa
1968 Mexico City	Bronze	Sabre, men's team	János Kalmár, Tibor Pézsa, Péter Bakonyi; T. Kovács, M. Meszéna
(West Germany) 1972 Munich	Bronze	Sabre, men's team	Tibor Pézsa, Péter Bakonyi; P. Gerevich, T. Kovács, P. Marót
(Soviet Union) 1980 Moscow	Silver	Épée, men's individual	Ernő Kolczonay
(Soviet Union) 1980 Moscow	Bronze	Sabre, men's team	Rudolf Nébald, György Nébald; I. Gedővári, P. Gerevich, F. Hammang
(South Korea) 1988 Seoul	Gold	Sabre, men's team	György Nébald; L. Csongrádi, B. Szabó, I. Bujdosó, I. Gedővári
(South Korea) 1988 Seoul	Bronze	Foil, men's team	István Szelei; Zs. Érsek, I. Busa, R. Gátai, P. Szekeres
(South Korea) 1988 Seoul	Bronze	Foil, women's team	Zsuzsa Jánosi; Zs. Szőcs, K. Tuschák, E. Kovács, G. Stefanek
(Spain) 1992 Barcelona	Silver	Épée, men's team	Krisztián Kulcsár; I. Kovács, F. Hegedűs, E. Kolczonay, G. Totola
(Spain) 1992 Barcelona	Silver	Sabre, men's team	György Nébald; B. Szabó, Cs. Köves, P. Abay, I. Bujdosó
(Australia) 2000 Sydney	Gold	Épée, women's individual	Tímea Nagy
(Greece) 2004 Athens	Gold	Épée, women's individual	Tímea Nagy
(Greece) 2004 Athens	Silver	Épée, men's team	Gábor Boczkó, Krisztián Kulcsár, Géza Imre; I. Kovács
(Brazil) 2016 Rio de Janeiro	Silver	Épée, men's individual	Géza Imre
(Brazil) 2016 Rio de Janeiro	Bronze	Épée, men's team	Gábor Boczkó, Géza Imre, Péter Somfai; A. Rédli

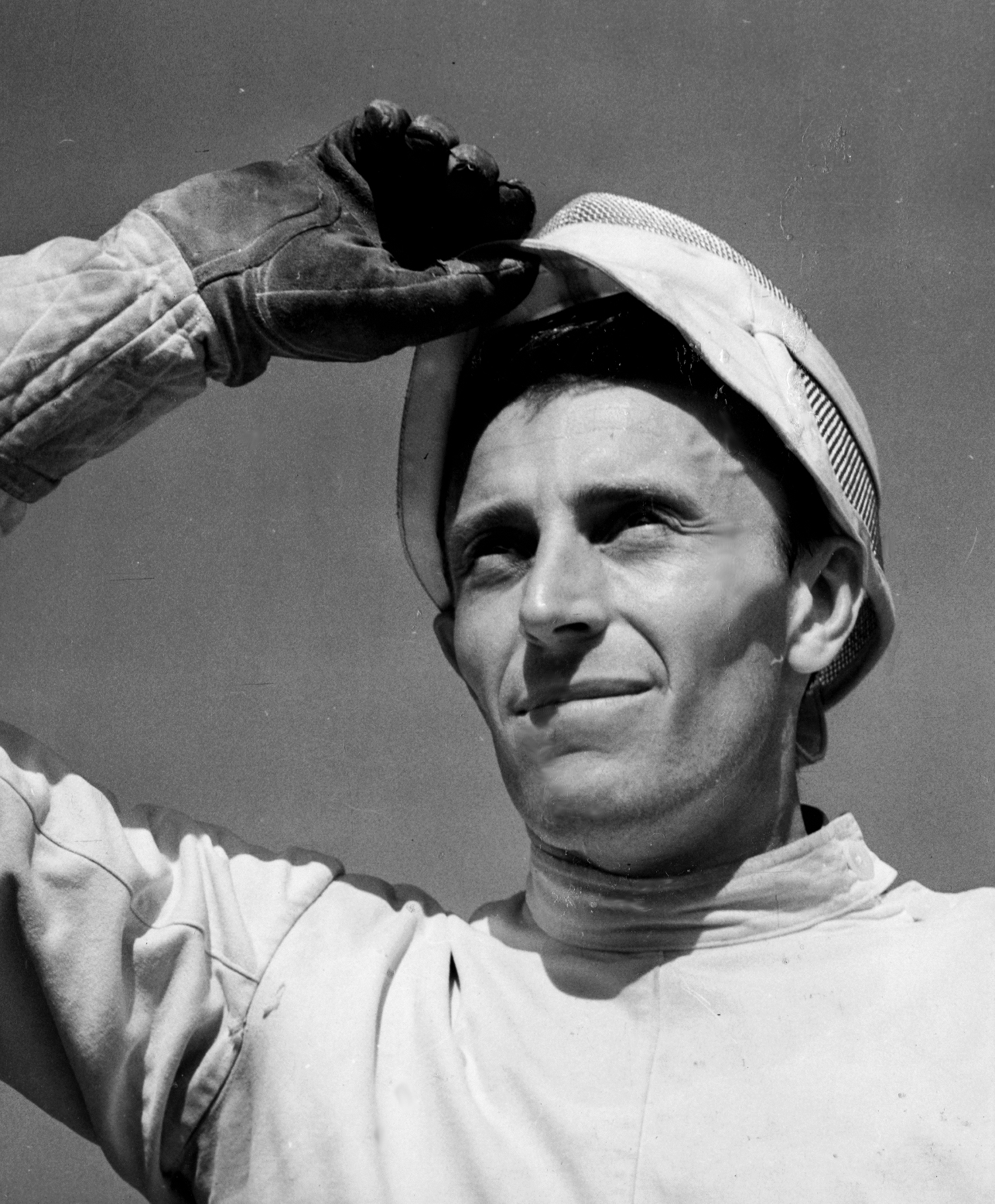
Tibor Pézsa
(1957–1973)

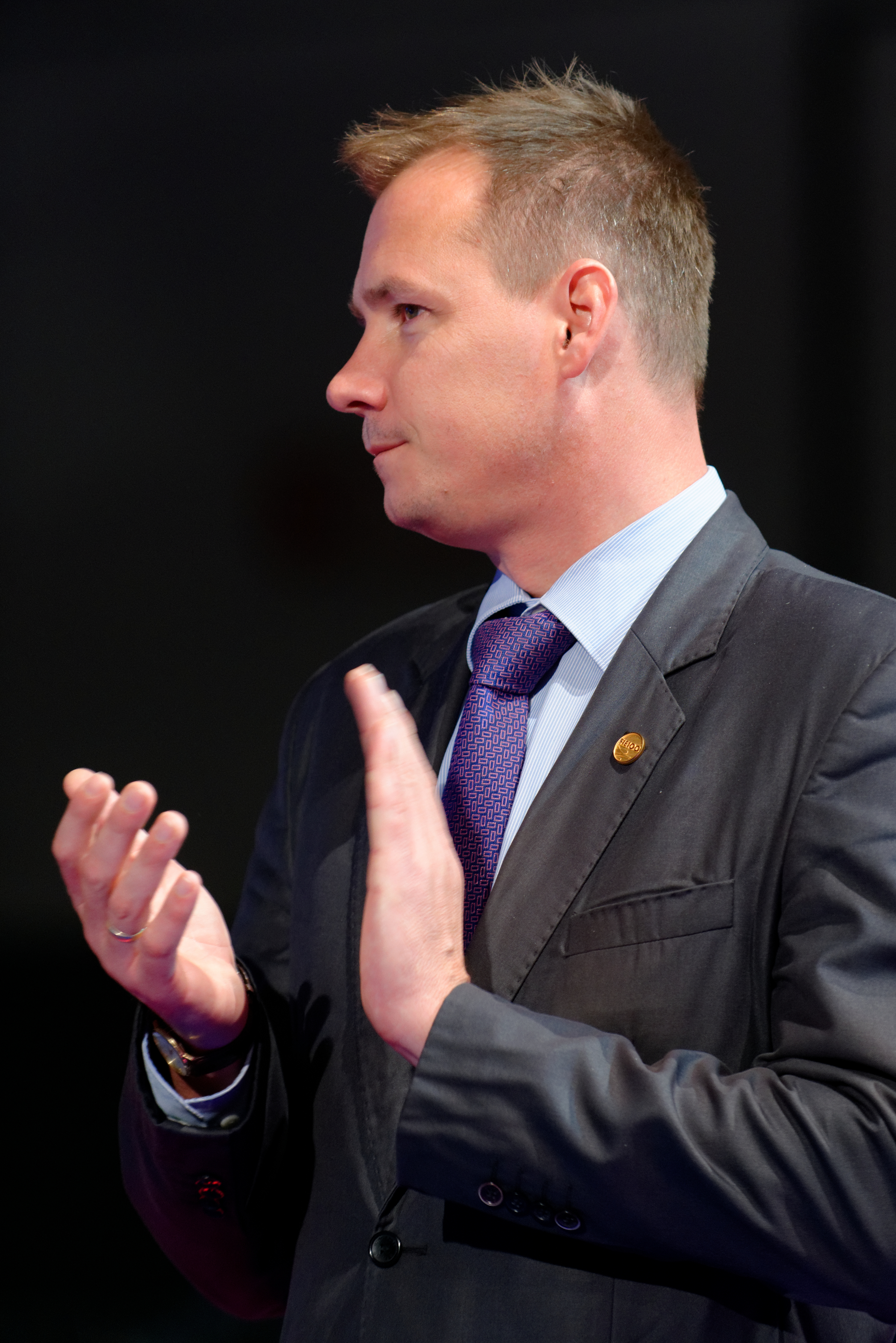
Krisztián Kulcsár

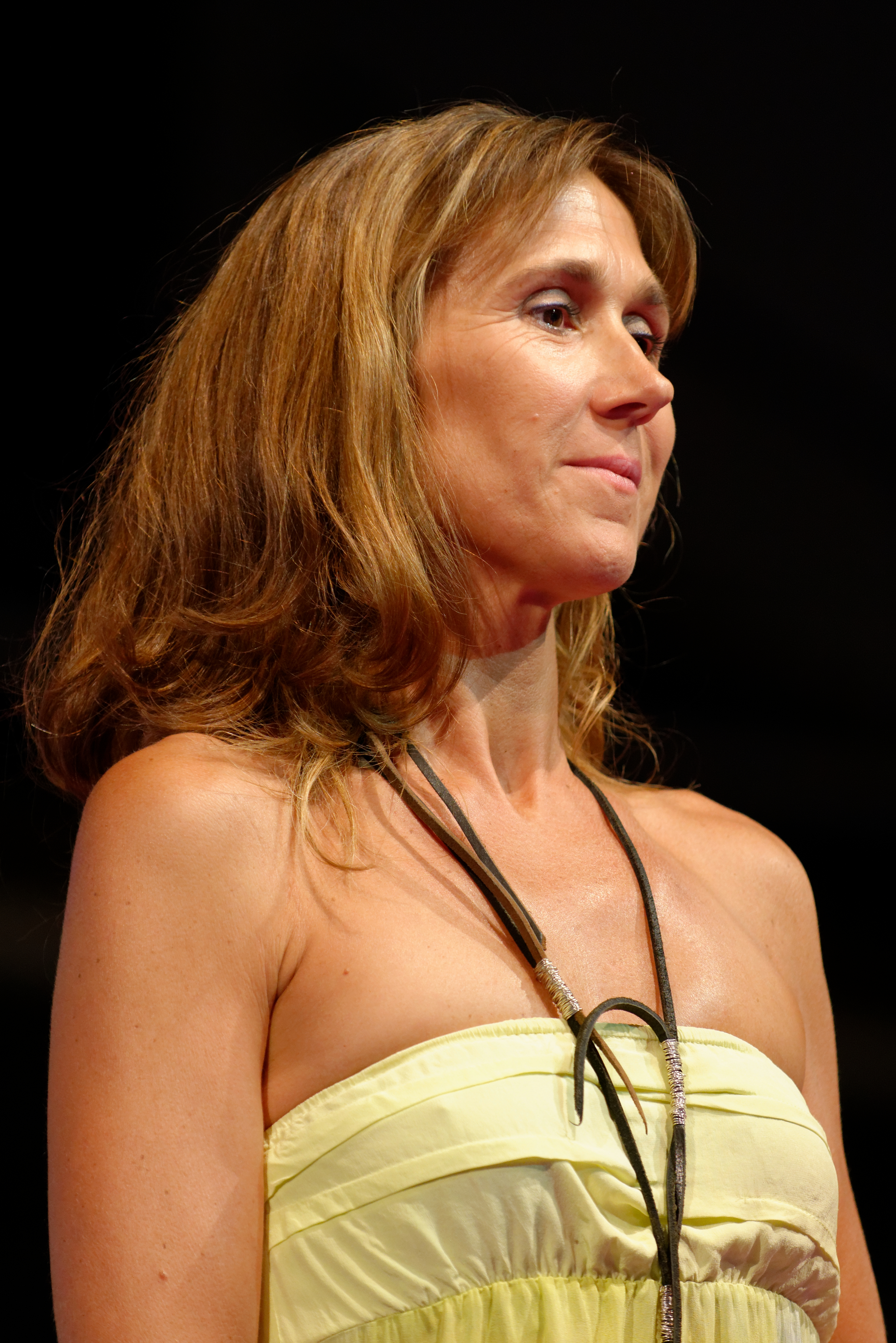
Tímea Nagy (1991–2010)

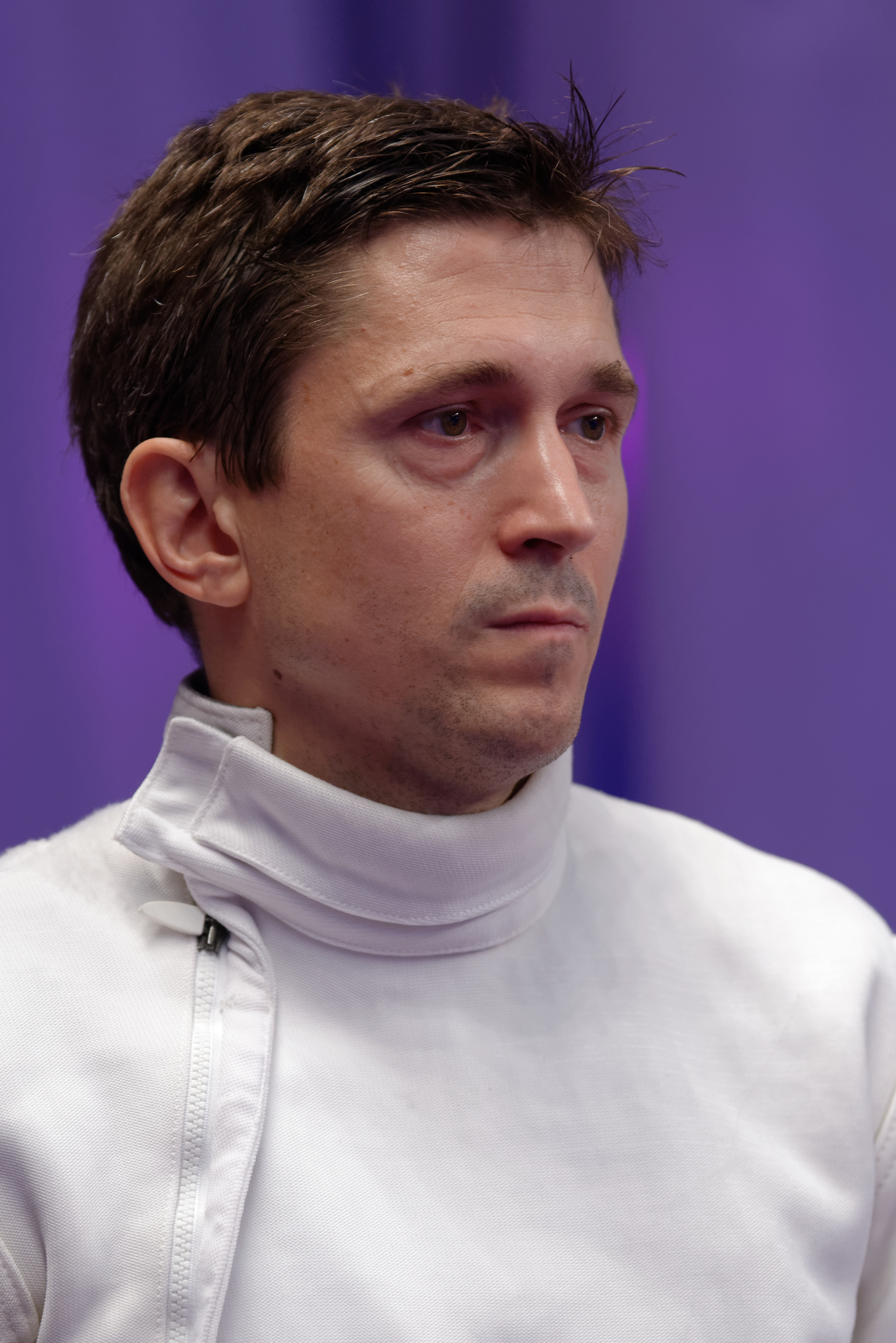
Géza Imre (1996– )

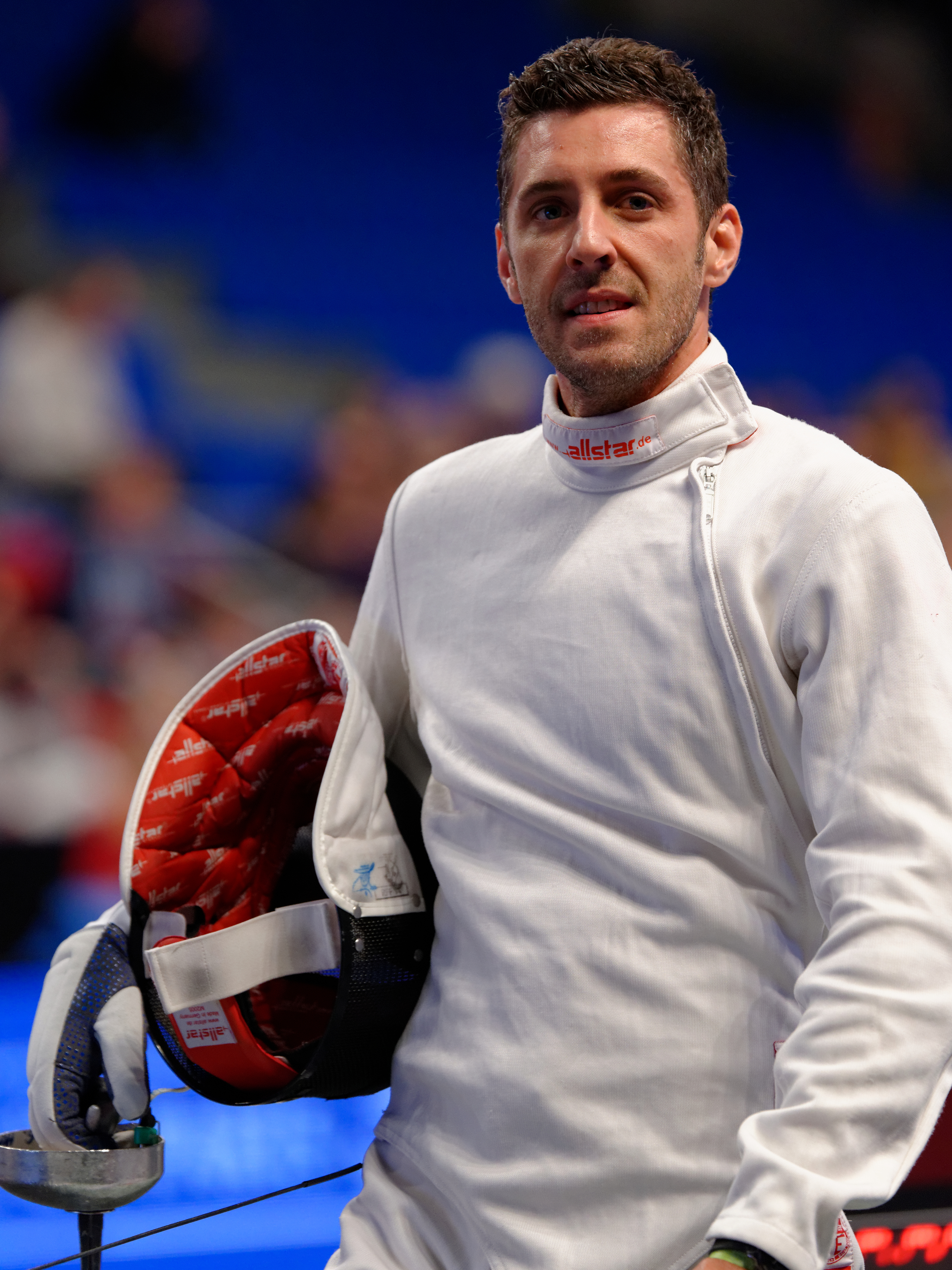
Gábor Boczkó (1997– )

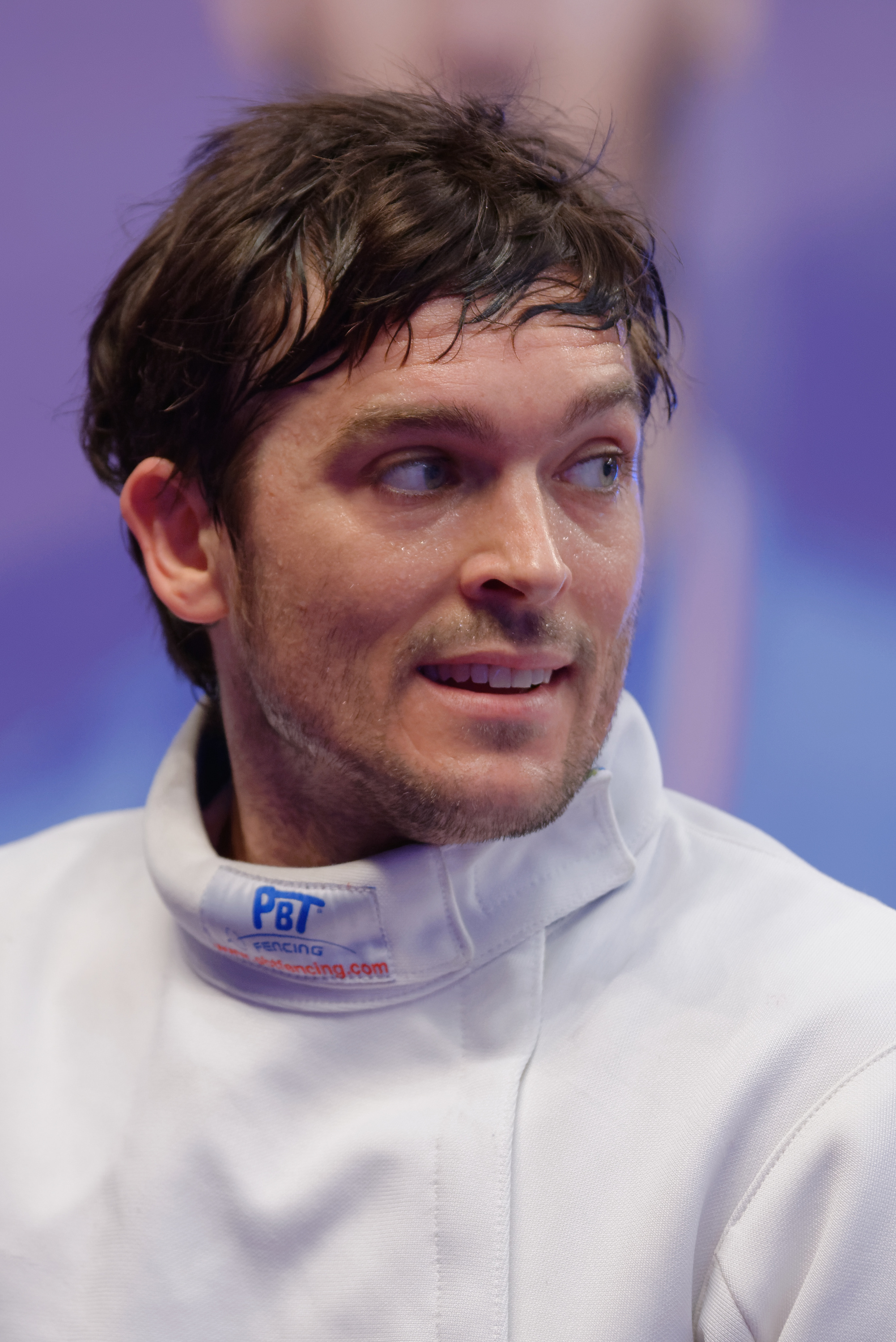
Péter Somfai

=== World Championships ===
Year	Category	Name
1953	Foil, women's team	Ilona Elek, Margit Elek
1953	Sabre, men's team	Rudolf Kárpáti, Bertalan Papp
1954	Foil, women's team	Ilona Elek, Margit Elek
1954	Sabre, men's individual	Rudolf Kárpáti
1954	Sabre, men's team	Rudolf Kárpáti, Bertalan Papp
1955	Foil, women's team	Ilona Elek, Margit Elek
1955	Sabre, men's team	Rudolf Kárpáti, Bertalan Papp
1957	Foil, men's team	József Gyuricza
1957	Sabre, men's team	Rudolf Kárpáti
1958	Sabre, men's team	Rudolf Kárpáti
1959	Sabre, men's individual	Rudolf Kárpáti
1962	Foil, women's team	Mária Gulácsy
1966	Sabre, men's team	Péter Bakonyi, Tibor Pézsa
1967	Foil, women's team	Mária Gulácsy
1970	Sabre, men's individual	Tibor Pézsa
1978	Épée, men's team	Ernő Kolczonay
1978	Sabre, men's team	György Nébald
1981	Sabre, men's team	György Nébald, Rudolf Nébald
1982	Sabre, men's team	György Nébald
1985	Sabre, men's individual	György Nébald
1987	Foil, women's team	Zsuzsa Jánosi
1990	Sabre, men's individual	György Nébald
1991	Sabre, men's team	György Nébald
1992	Épée, women's team	Tímea Nagy
1995	Épée, women's team	Tímea Nagy
1997	Épée, women's team	Tímea Nagy
1998	Épée, men's team	Géza Imre, Krisztián Kulcsár
1999	Épée, women's team	Hajnalka Tóth, Tímea Nagy
2001	Épée, men's team	Krisztián Kulcsár, Géza Imre
2002	Épée, women's team	Hajnalka Király, Tímea Nagy
2006	Épée, women's individual	Tímea Nagy
2007	Épée, men's individual	Krisztián Kulcsár
2013	Épée, men's team	Géza Imre, Gábor Boczkó
2015	Épée, men's individual	Géza Imre

=== European Championships ===
Year	Category	Name
1991	Foil, women's team	Zsuzsa Jánosi
1991	Sabre, men's team	György Nébald
1995	Épée, women's individual	Tímea Nagy
1998	Épée, men's team	Géza Imre, Krisztián Kulcsár
2002	Épée, men's individual	Gábor Boczkó
2003	Épée, men's individual	Gábor Boczkó
2003	Foil, women's individual	Gabriella Varga
2006	Épée, men's team	Gábor Boczkó, Géza Imre
2007	Épée, men's team	Géza Imre, Gábor Boczkó, Krisztián Kulcsár
2007	Foil, women's team	Edina Knapek, Gabriella Varga
2008	Épée, men's individual	Géza Imre
2009	Épée, men's team	Gábor Boczkó, Géza Imre, Péter Somfai
2010	Épée, men's team	Gábor Boczkó, Géza Imre, Péter Somfai

== Notable former fencers ==
Sabre

- Bertalan Papp
- Rudolf Kárpáti
- Péter Bakonyi
- Tibor Pézsa
- Rudolf Nébald
- György Nébald

Épée

- Ernő Kolczonay
- Hajnalka Kiraly
- Tímea Nagy
- Krisztián Kulcsár
- Géza Imre
- Gábor Boczkó
- Hajnalka Tóth
- Péter Somfai

Foil

- Ilona Elek
- Margit Elek
- József Gyuricza
- Mária Gulácsy
- Zsuzsa Jánosi
- Edina Knapek
- Gabriella Varga

== See also ==
- Hungarian Fencer of the Year
