= MTK Budapest (fencing) =

Fencing club in Budapest, Hungary

- Founded: 1908
- Based in: Budapest, Hungary
- Arena: Lantos Mihály Sporttelep
- Colors: blue and white
- Chairman: Tamás Deutsch
- Manager: Marina Várkonyi; Csilla Sütő
- Website: mtk.hu

MTK Budapest created a fencing section on 17 October 1908, which had one of the most successful teams in Hungary.

== Achievements ==
Competition	(gold) Gold	(silver) Silver	(bronze) Bronze	Total
Summer Olympic Games				
World Championships				
European Championships				
Universiade and World Universiade Summer Games				
World Cup				
European Cup				

== Current squad ==
=== Technical and Managerial Staff ===
Fencing team officials according to the official website:

Name	Nat.	Job
Csilla Sütő	(Hungary)	Branch Director (sabre)
Gábor Udvarhelyi	(Hungary)	Head coach
Ildikó Mincza	(Hungary)	Branch President (foil, épée)
Gábor Gárdos	(Hungary)	Branch President (sabre)
Marina Várkonyi	(Hungary)	Branch Director (foil, épée)
Róbert Bakodi	(Hungary)	Coach
Dániel Bojti	(Hungary)	Coach
István László	(Hungary)	Coach
András Peterdi	(Hungary)	Coach
Tibor Török	(Hungary)	Coach
Miklós Kósa	(Hungary)	Junior coach
Gergely Sárközi	(Hungary)	Junior coach

=== Athletes ===
==== Men's squad ====
- Botond Árpási
- Gellért Csapodi
- András Elbert
- Bence Fabó
- Róbert Gátai
- Ervin Karasszon
- András Kovács
- István Kovács
- Balázs Gábor Lengyel
- Áron Makovecz
- Csaba Pásztor
- Ervin Sági
- Péter Szényi
- Péter Valicsek

==== Women's squad ====
- Nóra Balla
- Katalin Báthory
- Edina Czeglédi, dr.
- Zita Fenyősi
- Zsófia Gajdán
- Nóra Garam
- Nóra Kárpáti
- Regina Lampert
- Anna Márton
- Anita Nyéki
- Barbara Szombath

== Fencing Hall ==
- Name: Lantos Mihály Sporttelep
- City: Budapest, Hungary
- Address: H-1149 Budapest, XIV. district, Rákospatak u. 13-27.

== International success ==
=== Olympic medalists ===
The team's olympic medalists are shown below.

Games	Medal	Category	Name
(United Kingdom) 1948 London	Gold	Sabre, men's team	Bertalan Papp, Aladár Gerevich, Tibor Berczelly; L. Rajcsányi, R. Kárpáti, P. Kovács
(United Kingdom) 1948 London	Gold	Sabre, men's individual	Aladár Gerevich
(United Kingdom) 1948 London	Bronze	Foil, men's individual	Lajos Maszlay
(Finland) 1952 Helsinki	Gold	Sabre, men's team	Tibor Berczelly, Aladár Gerevich; B. Papp, L. Rajcsányi, R. Kárpáti, P. Kovács
(Finland) 1952 Helsinki	Silver	Sabre, men's individual	Aladár Gerevich
(Finland) 1952 Helsinki	Bronze	Foil, men's team	Tibor Berczelly, Aladár Gerevich, József Sákovics; E. Palócz, E. Tilli, L. Maszlay
(Finland) 1952 Helsinki	Bronze	Sabre, men's individual	Tibor Berczelly
(Australia) 1956 Melbourne	Gold	Sabre, men's team	Aladár Gerevich; A. Keresztes, R. Kárpáti, J. Hámori, P. Kovács, D. Magay
(Australia) 1956 Melbourne	Silver	Épée, men's team	Barnabás Berzsenyi, József Sákovics; B. Rerrich, A. Nagy, J. Marosi, L. Balthazár
(Australia) 1956 Melbourne	Bronze	Foil, men's team	József Sákovics; L. Somodi, J. Gyuricza, E. Tilli, J. Marosi, M. Fülöp
(Italy) 1960 Rome	Gold	Sabre, men's team	Zoltán Horváth, Aladár Gerevich; T. Mendelényi, R. Kárpáti, P. Kovács, G. Delneky
(Italy) 1960 Rome	Silver	Sabre, men's individual	Zoltán Horváth
(Italy) 1960 Rome	Silver	Foil, women's team	Lídia Dömölky; Gy. Marvalics, I. Rejtő, M. Nyári, K. Juhász
(Japan) 1964 Tokyo	Gold	Épée, men's team	Árpád Bárány, Tamás Gábor; I. Kausz, Gy. Kulcsár, Z. Nemere
(Japan) 1964 Tokyo	Gold	Foil, women's team	Lídia Dömölky; P. Marosi, K. Juhász, J. Ágoston, I. Rejtő
1968 Mexico City	Gold	Épée, men's team	Pál Schmitt; Cs. Fenyvesi, Z. Nemere, Gy. Kulcsár, P. B.Nagy
1968 Mexico City	Silver	Foil, women's team	Lídia Dömölky; I. Bóbis, I. Rejtő, M. Gulácsy, P. Marosi
(West Germany) 1972 Munich	Gold	Épée, men's team	Pál Schmitt; S. Erdős, Cs. Fenyvesi, Gy. Kulcsár, I. Osztrics
(West Germany) 1972 Munich	Silver	Foil, women's team	Ildikó Tordasi; I. Rejtő, I. Bóbis, M. Szolnoki, I. Rónay
(Canada) 1976 Montreal	Gold	Foil, women's individual	Ildikó Tordasi
(Canada) 1976 Montreal	Bronze	Foil, women's team	Ildikó Tordasi, Edit Kovács; I. Rejtő, I. Bóbis, M. Maros
(Soviet Union) 1980 Moscow	Bronze	Foil, women's team	Edit Kovács, Ildikó Tordasi, Zsuzsanna Szőcs; M. Maros, G. Stefanek
(South Korea) 1988 Seoul	Bronze	Foil, men's team	Róbert Gátai; I. Szelei, Zs. Érsek, I. Busa, P. Szekeres
(South Korea) 1988 Seoul	Bronze	Foil, women's team	Zsuzsanna Szőcs, Katalin Tuschák, Edit Kovács; Zs. Jánosi, G. Stefanek
(Spain) 1992 Barcelona	Silver	Épée, men's team	Iván Kovács, Gábor Totola; K. Kulcsár, F. Hegedűs, E. Kolczonay
(China) 2008 Beijing	Bronze	Épée, women's individual	Ildikó Mincza

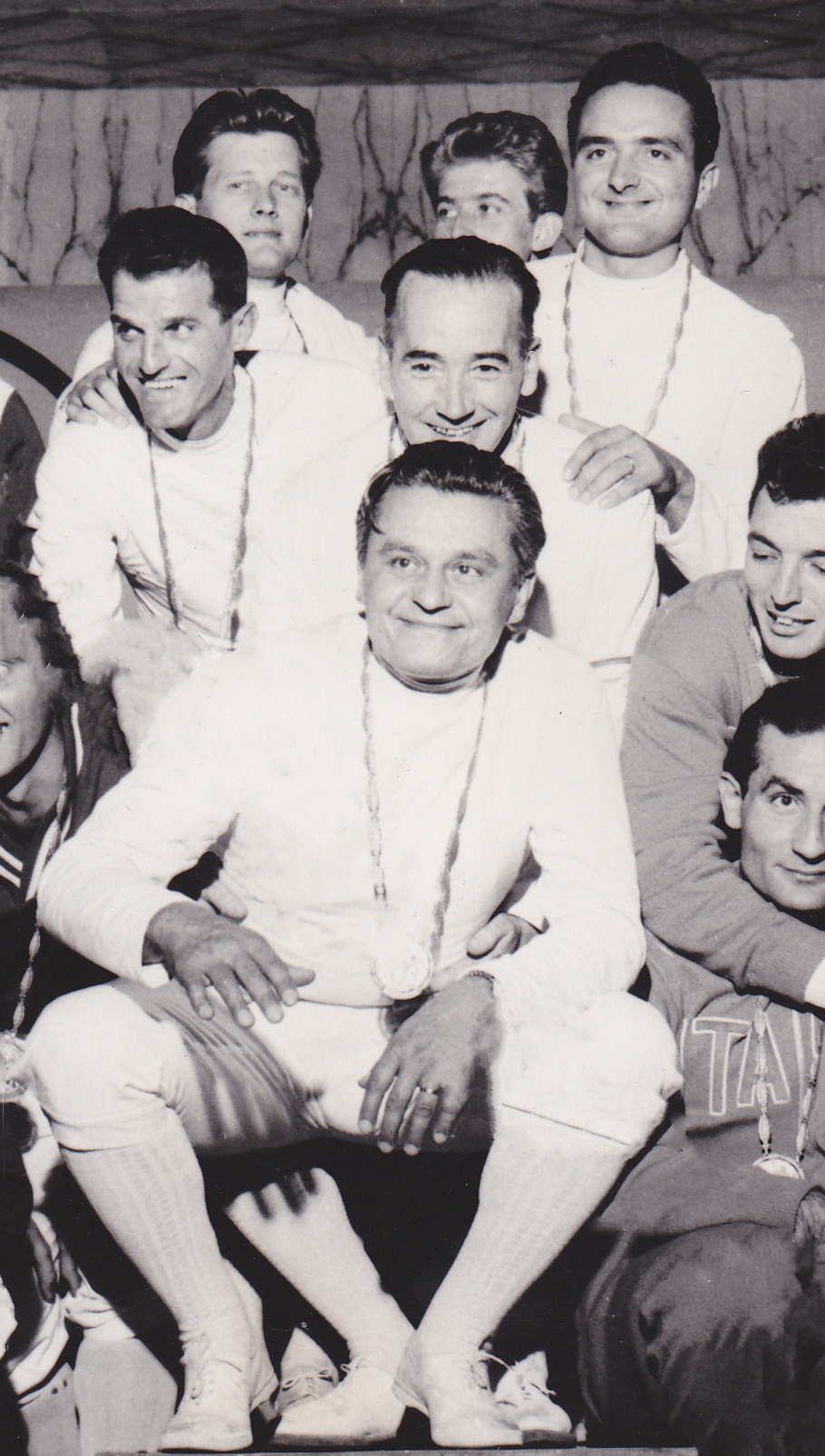
1960 olympic Sabre, men's team

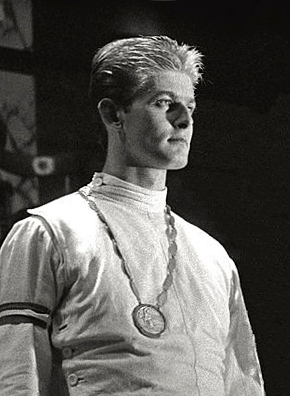
Zoltán Horváth (1957–1971)

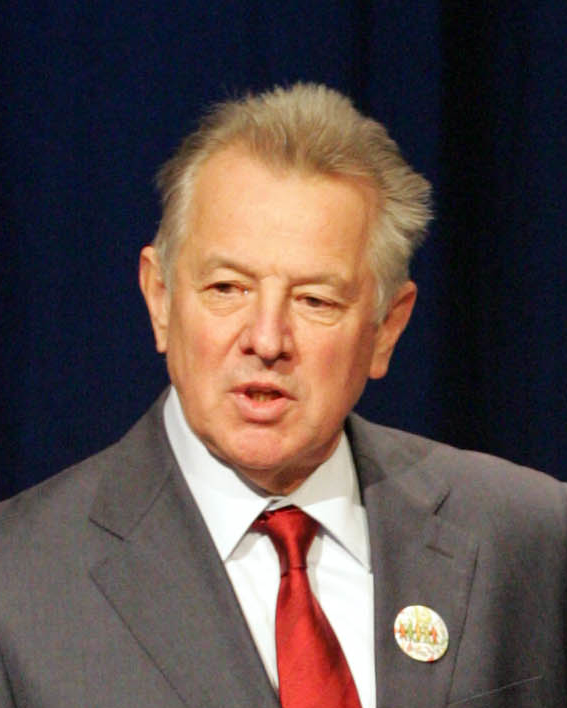
Pál Schmitt
(1955–1977)

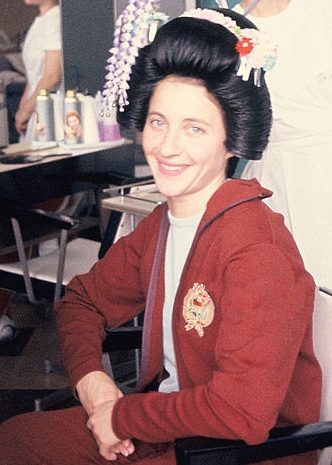
Lídia Dömölky (1958–1970)

== See also ==
- Hungarian Fencer of the Year
