= Újpesti TE (fencing) =

Fencing club in Budapest, Hungary

- Founded: 1922
- Based in: Budapest, Hungary
- Location: Király u. 71
- Colors: purple and white
- Chairman: István Őze
- Manager: Dezső László
- Website: ute.hu

Újpesti TE created a fencing section in 1922, which had one of the most successful teams in Hungary.

== Achievements ==
Competition	(gold) Gold	(silver) Silver	(bronze) Bronze	Total
Summer Olympic Games	9	10	9	28
World Championships	21			
European Championships	5			
Universiade and World Universiade Summer Games				
World Cup				
European Cup				

== Current squad ==
=== Technical and Managerial Staff ===
Fencing team officials according to the official website:

Name	Nat.	Job
Dezső László	(Hungary)	Branch President
Péter Bíró	(Hungary)	Coach, foil
Viktor Feczer	(Hungary)	Coach, foil, épée
Rita Gáborján	(Hungary)	Coach, foil, épée
László Gergácz	(Hungary)	Coach, sabre
Ádám Karvalics	(Hungary)	Coach, foil
László Kossuth	(Hungary)	Coach, sabre, foil
Laura Kovács	(Hungary)	Coach, sabre
Gábor Kreiss	(Hungary)	Coach, foil
Kolos Kun	(Hungary)	Coach, sabre
Zoltán Beszédes	(Hungary)	Gunsmith

=== Athletes ===
==== Men's squad ====
- Bálint Kossuth

==== Women's squad ====
- Fruzsina Gólya
- Fanni Kreiss
- Viktória Mesteri
- Aida Mohamed

== Fencing Hall ==
- Name: UTE Vívócsarnok
- City: Budapest, Hungary
- Address: H-1077 Budapest, VII. district, Király u. 71.

== International success ==
=== Olympic medalists ===
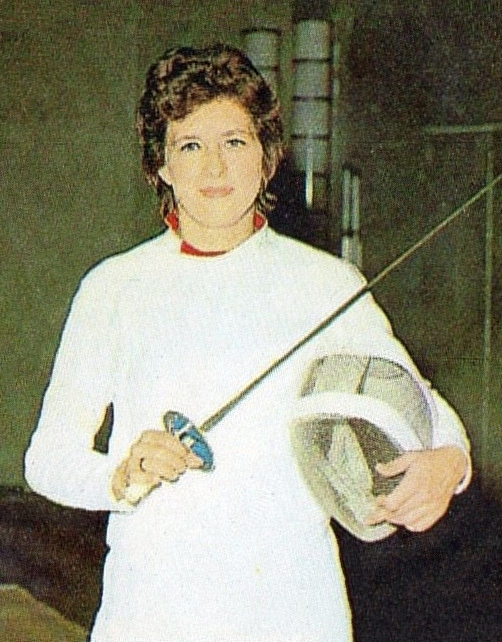
Ildikó Rejtő (2x olympic, 5x world champion)

The team's olympic medalists are shown below.

Games	Medal	Category	Name
(Germany) 1936 Berlin	Gold	Sabre, men's team	Endre Kabos; P. Kovács, T. Berczelly, I. Rajczy, A. Gerevich, L. Rajcsányi
(Germany) 1936 Berlin	Gold	Sabre, men's individual	Endre Kabos
(Australia) 1956 Melbourne	Bronze	Foil, men's team	id. Lajos Somodi; J. Gyuricza, E. Tilli, J. Marosi, M. Fülöp, J. Sákovics
(Italy) 1960 Rome	Silver	Foil, women's team	Ildikó Rejtő; Gy. Marvalics, M. Nyári, K. Juhász, L. Dömölky
(Japan) 1964 Tokyo	Gold	Foil, women's individual	Ildikó Rejtő
(Japan) 1964 Tokyo	Gold	Foil, women's team	Paula Marosi, Ildikó Rejtő; K. Juhász, J. Ágoston, L. Dömölky
1968 Mexico City	Gold	Épée, men's team	Pál B. Nagy; Cs. Fenyvesi, Z. Nemere, P. Schmitt, Gy. Kulcsár
1968 Mexico City	Silver	Foil, women's team	Ildikó Rejtő; L. Dömölky, I. Bóbis, M. Gulácsy, P. Marosi
1968 Mexico City	Bronze	Foil, women's individual	Ildikó Rejtő
(West Germany) 1972 Munich	Silver	Foil, women's team	Ildikó Rejtő, Mária Szolnoki, Ildikó Rónay; I. Bóbis, I. Tordasi
(Canada) 1976 Montreal	Bronze	Foil, women's team	Ildikó Rejtő; I. Tordasi, I. Bóbis, M. Maros E. Kovács
(Soviet Union) 1980 Moscow	Bronze	Sabre, men's individual	Imre Gedővári
(Soviet Union) 1980 Moscow	Bronze	Foil, women's team	Gertrúd Stefanek; M. Maros, E. Kovács, I. Tordasi, Zs. Szőcs
(Soviet Union) 1980 Moscow	Bronze	Sabre, men's team	Imre Gedővári; R. Nébald, P. Gerevich, Gy. Nébald, F. Hammang
(South Korea) 1988 Seoul	Gold	Sabre, men's team	László Csongrádi, Bence Szabó; Gy. Nébald, I. Bujdosó, I. Gedővári
(South Korea) 1988 Seoul	Bronze	Foil, men's team	Pál Szekeres; I. Szelei, Zs. Érsek, I. Busa, R. Gátai
(South Korea) 1988 Seoul	Bronze	Foil, women's team	Gertrúd Stefanek; Zs. Jánosi, Zs. Szőcs, K. Tuschák, E. Kovács
(Spain) 1992 Barcelona	Gold	Sabre, men's individual	Bence Szabó
(Spain) 1992 Barcelona	Silver	Sabre, men's team	Bence Szabó, Csaba Köves, Péter Abay; Gy. Nébald, I. Bujdosó
(United States) 1996 Atlanta	Silver	Sabre, men's team	Csaba Köves, József Navarrete, Bence Szabó

=== World Championships ===
Year	Category	Name
1962	Foil, women's team	Ildikó Újlaky-Rejtő, Paula Marosi
1963	Foil, women's individual	Ildikó Újlaky-Rejtő
1967	Foil, women's team	Ildikó Újlaky-Rejtő
1973	Foil, women's team	Mária Szolnoki, Ildikó Újlaky-Rejtő
1978	Sabre, men's team	Imre Gedővári, Zoltán Nagyházi
1981	Épée, men's individual	Zoltán Székely
1981	Sabre, men's team	Imre Gedővári
1982	Sabre, men's team	Imre Gedővári, Zoltán Nagyházi
1987	Foil, women's team	Gertrúd Stefanek
1991	Sabre, men's team	Péter Abay, Csaba Köves, Bence Szabó
1993	Sabre, men's team	Péter Abay, Csaba Köves, József Navarrete, Bence Szabó
1998	Sabre, men's team	József Navarrete

=== European Championships ===
Year	Category	Name
1981	Sabre, men's individual	Imre Gedővári
1991	Foil, women's team	Ildikó Pusztai, Gertrúd Stefanek
1991	Sabre, men's team	Bence Szabó, Péter Abay

== Notable former fencers ==
Sabre

- Endre Kabos
- Imre Gedővári
- Zoltán Nagyházi
- László Csongrádi
- Bence Szabó
- Csaba Köves
- József Navarrete
- Péter Abay

Épée

- Pál B. Nagy
- Zoltán Székely

Foil

- Paula Marosi
- Ildikó Újlaky-Rejtő
- Mária Szolnoki
- Gertrúd Stefanek
- Ildikó Pusztai

== See also ==
- Hungarian Fencer of the Year
