= Vasas SC (fencing) =

- Founded: 1947
- Based in: Budapest, Hungary
- Arena: Kovács Pál Vívócsarnok
- Colors: Red and blue
- Chairman: László Markovits
- Manager: Domonkos Ferjancsik
- Website: vasassc.hu

Vasas SC created a fencing section in 1947, which had one of the most successful teams in Hungary.

== Achievements ==
Competition	(gold) Gold	(silver) Silver	(bronze) Bronze	Total
Summer Olympic Games	9	3	6	18
World Championships	19			
European Championships	2			
Universiade and World Universiade Summer Games				
World Cup				
European Cup				

== Current squad ==
=== Technical and Managerial Staff ===
Fencing team officials according to the official website:

Name	Nat.	Job
Ernő Kemenes	(Hungary)	Honorary Branch President
Domonkos Ferjancsik	(Hungary)	Branch President
dr. György Boros	(Hungary)	Branch Director
Béla Somlai	(Hungary)	Coach, sabre
Péter Halla	(Hungary)	Coach, épée
Gergely Halla	(Hungary)	Coach, épée
Ádám Fridvalszky	(Hungary)	Coach, sabre
Ferenc Riba	(Hungary)	Coach, sabre
Ferenc Pinkóczi	(Hungary)	Coach, sabre
András Weiperth	(Hungary)	Coach, sabre
Etele Ravasz	(Hungary)	Coach, sabre
Sebestyén Puy	(Hungary)	Coach, sabre
Győző Kulcsár	(Hungary)	Coach, épée
Árpád Németh	(Hungary)	Coach, épée
István Szlovenszky	(Hungary)	Coach, épée
Izabella Laborc	(Hungary)	Coach, épée

=== Athletes ===
==== Men's squad ====
- Bálint Bakos
- Zsombor Bányai
- Levente Buta
- Dávid Nagy
- Pál Nagy
- Iliász Nikolász
- Etele Ravasz
- András Szatmári
- Áron Szilágyi

==== Women's squad ====
- Bianka Bukóczi
- Valéria Csonka
- Renáta Katona
- Léna Kelecsényi
- Míra
- Emese Szász

== Fencing Hall ==
- Name: Kovács Pál Vívócsarnok
- City: Budapest, Hungary
- Address: H-1026 Budapest, II. district, Pasaréti út 11-13.

== International success ==
=== Olympic medalists ===
The team's olympic medalists are shown below.

Games	Medal	Category	Name
(United Kingdom) 1948 London	Gold	Sabre, men's team	László Rajcsányi, Rudolf Kárpáti; B. Papp, A. Gerevich, T. Berczelly, P. Kovács
(Finland) 1952 Helsinki	Bronze	Foil, men's team	Endre Palócz, Endre Tilli; T. Berczelly, A. Gerevich, J. Sákovics, L. Maszalay
(Australia) 1956 Melbourne	Gold	Sabre, men's team	Pál Kovács; A. Keresztes, A. Gerevich, R. Kárpáti, J. Hámori, P. Kovács, D. Magay
(Australia) 1956 Melbourne	Bronze	Foil, men's team	Endre Tilli; L. Somodi, J. Gyuricza, J. Marosi, M. Fülöp, J. Sákovics
(Italy) 1960 Rome	Gold	Sabre, men's team	Pál Kovács, Gábor Delneky; T. Mendelényi, R. Kárpáti, Z. Horváth, A. Gerevich
(Japan) 1964 Tokyo	Gold	Épée, men's team	Zoltán Nemere; Á. Bárány, T. Gábor, I. Kausz, Gy. Kulcsár, Z. Nemere
1968 Mexico City	Bronze	Sabre, men's team	Tamás Kovács, Miklós Meszéna; J. Kalmár, T. Pézsa, P. Bakonyi
(West Germany) 1972 Munich	Silver	Sabre, men's individual	Péter Marót
(West Germany) 1972 Munich	Bronze	Sabre, men's team	Tamás Kovács, Péter Marót; P. Gerevich, T. Pézsa, P. Bakonyi
(Soviet Union) 1980 Moscow	Bronze	Sabre, men's team	Ferenc Hammang; I. Gedővári, R. Nébald, P. Gerevich, Gy. Nébald
(South Korea) 1988 Seoul	Gold	Sabre, men's team	Imre Bujdosó, Imre Gedővári; Gy. Nébald, L. Csongrádi, B. Szabó
(Spain) 1992 Barcelona	Silver	Sabre, men's team	Imre Bujdosó; B. Szabó, Cs. Köves, Gy. Nébald, P. Abay
(Greece) 2004 Athens	Silver	Sabre, men's individual	Zsolt Nemcsik
(United Kingdom) 2012 London	Gold	Sabre, men's individual	Áron Szilágyi
(Brazil) 2016 Rio de Janeiro	Gold	Épée, women's individual	Emese Szász
(Brazil) 2016 Rio de Janeiro	Gold	Sabre, men's individual	Áron Szilágyi
(Japan) 2020 Tokyo	Gold	Sabre, men's individual	Áron Szilágyi
(Japan) 2020 Tokyo	Bronze	Sabre, men's team	Áron Szilágyi; A. Szatmári, T. Decsi, C. Gémesi

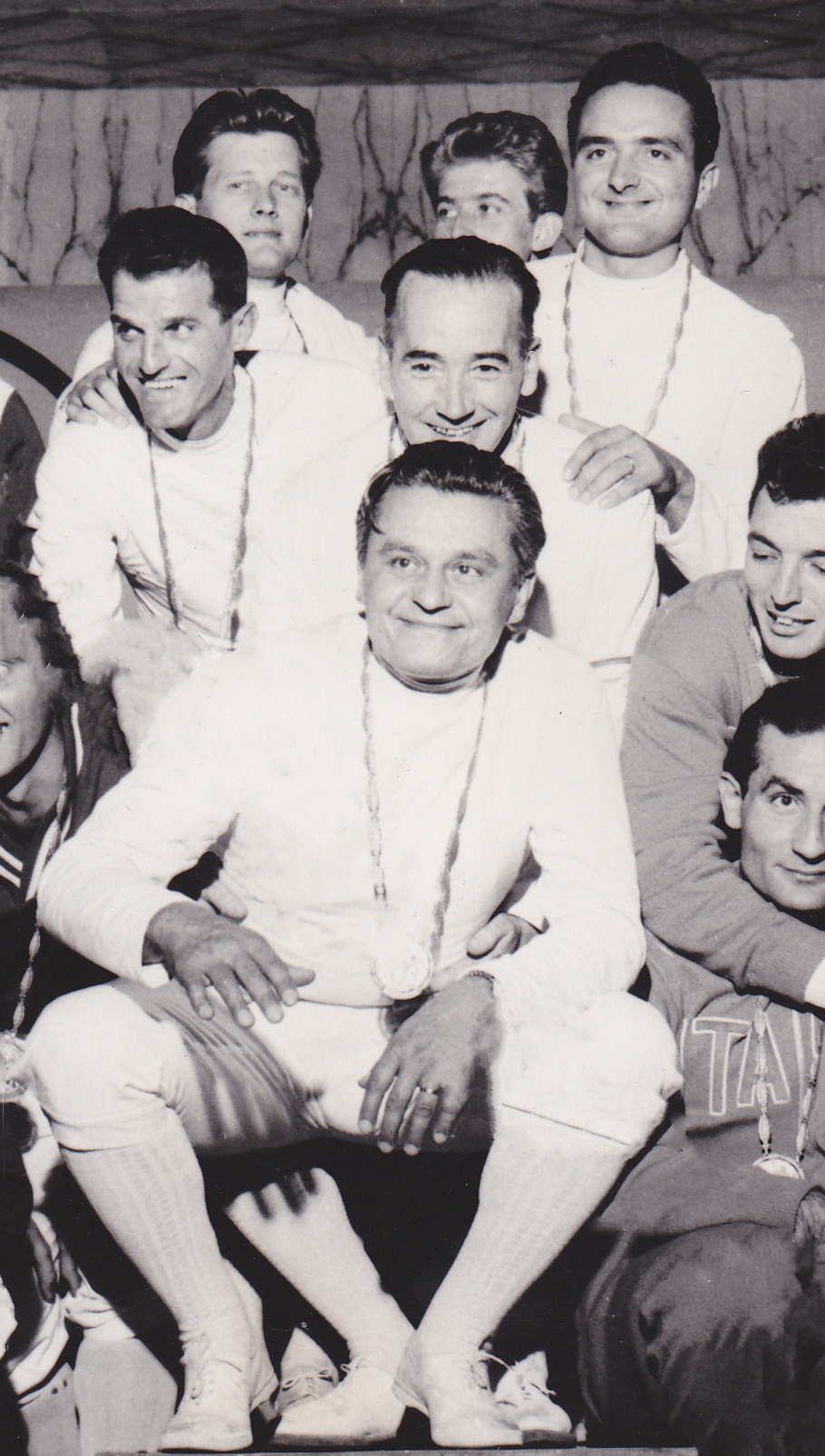
1960 olympic Sabre, men's team

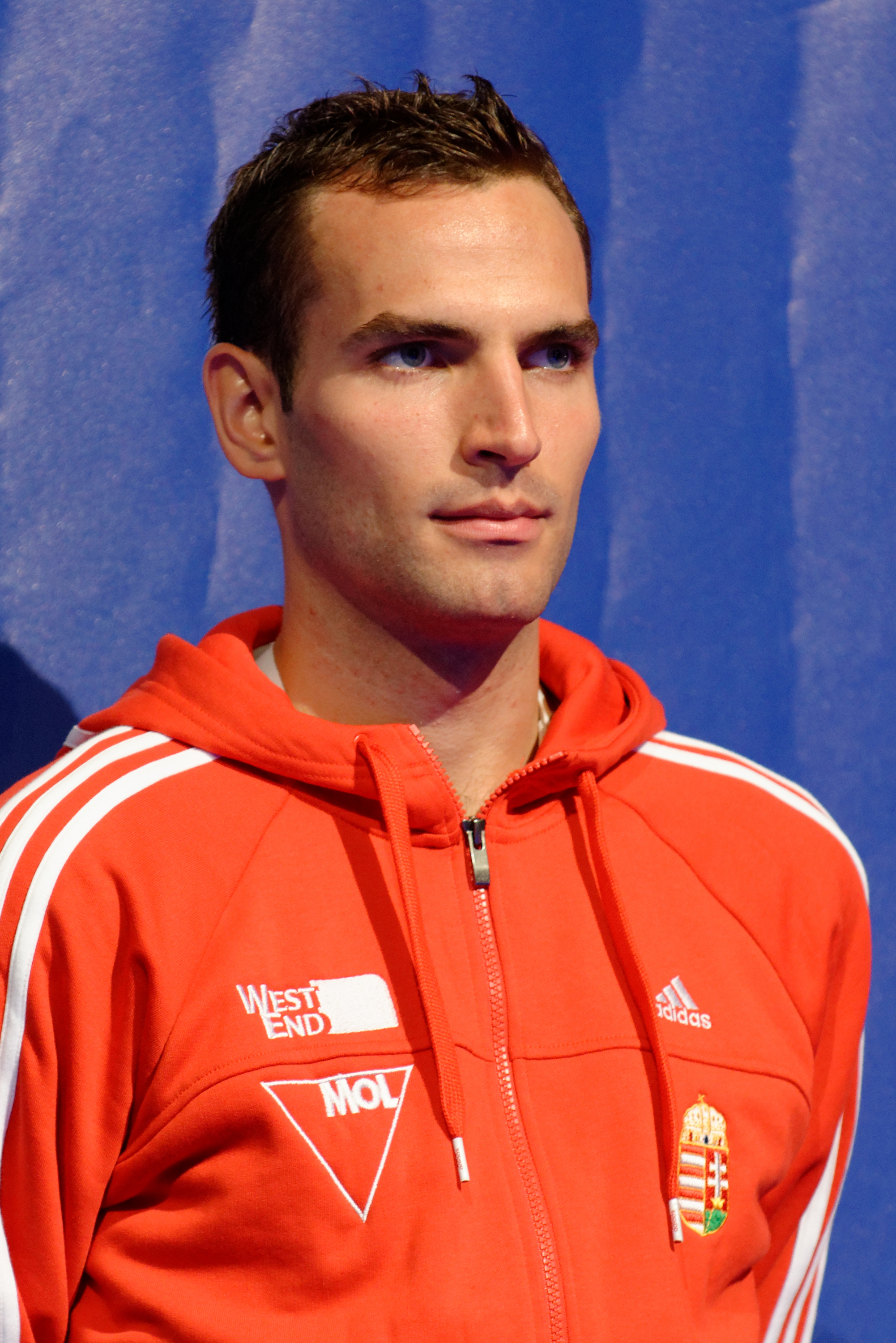
Áron Szilágyi

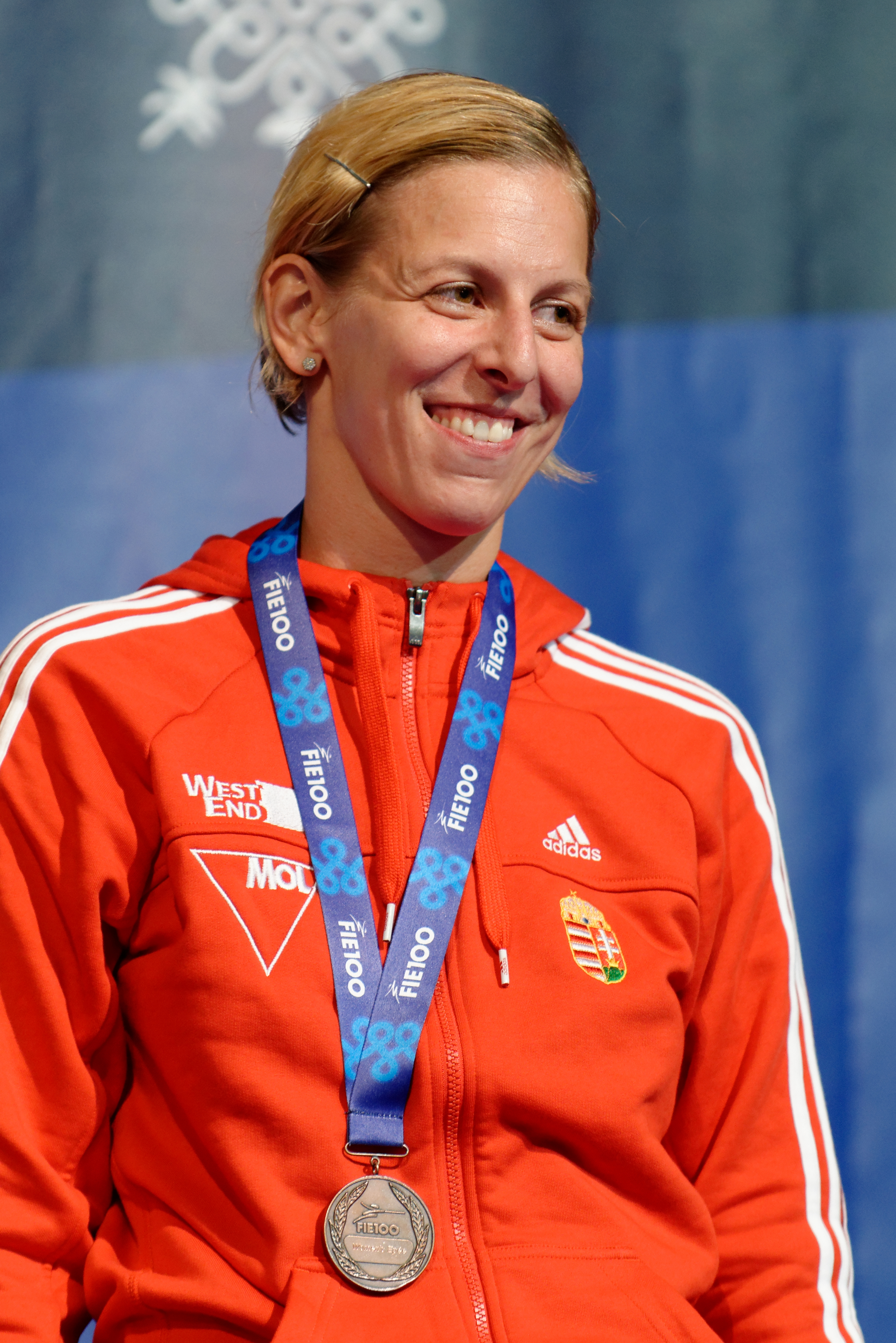
Emese Szász

=== World Championships ===
Year	Category	Name
1955	Sabre, men's team	Pál Kovács
1957	Foil, men's team	Endre Tilli
1957	Sabre, men's team	Pál Kovács
1958	Sabre, men's team	Pál Kovács
1965	Épée, men's individual	Zoltán Nemere
1966	Sabre, men's team	Tamás Kovács, Miklós Meszéna
1973	Sabre, men's team	Tamás Kovács, Attila Kovács, Péter Marót, Ferenc Hammang
1978	Sabre, men's team	Ferenc Hammang
1981	Sabre, men's team	Pál Gerevich
1982	Sabre, men's team	Pál Gerevich
1991	Sabre, men's team	Imre Bujdosó
1998	Sabre, men's team	Domonkos Ferjancsik, Zsolt Nemcsik
2007	Sabre, men's team	Zsolt Nemcsik, Áron Szilágyi

=== European Championships ===
Year	Category	Name
1991	Sabre, men's team	Imre Bujdosó
2015	Sabre, men's individual	Áron Szilágyi

== Notable former fencers ==
Sabre

- Rudolf Kárpáti
- László Rajcsányi
- Gábor Delneky
- Pál Kovács
- Miklós Meszéna
- Attila Kovács
- Tamás Kovács
- Péter Marót
- Ferenc Hammang
- Pál Gerevich
- Imre Gedővári
- Imre Bujdosó
- Domonkos Ferjancsik
- Zsolt Nemcsik
- Áron Szilágyi

Épée

- Zoltán Nemere

Foil

- Endre Tilli

== See also ==
- Hungarian Fencer of the Year
