= 2018 Hungarian Fencing Championships =

- Host city: Budapest
- Dates: 20–22 December 2018

The 2018 Hungarian Fencing Championships were the 113th edition of the Hungarian Fencing Championships, which took place on 20–22 December 2018 at the Aladár Gerevich National Sports Hall in Budapest.

== Schedule ==
●	Finals

December	20	21	22	Total
Foil Individual	Men / Women			2
Foil Team			Men / Women	2
Épée Individual	Men / Women			2
Épée Team			Men / Women	2
Sabre Individual	Men / Women			2
Sabre Team			Men / Women	2
Total Gold Medals	6	0	6	12

== Results ==
=== Men's ===
Event	Gold	Silver	Bronze
Individual épée	Dávid Nagy; Vasas	András Peterdi; BHSE	Tibor Andrásfi; BVSC Máté Koch; Vasas
Team épée	BHSE; Dániel Hosszú; András Rédli; Gergely Siklósi; Péter Somfai	BVSC; Tibor Andrásfi; Barnabás Bánsági; Gergő Kiss; Niko Vuorinen	Vasas; Bálint Bakos; Zsombor Bányai; Máté Koch; Dávid Nagy
Individual foil	Dániel Dósa; Törekvés	Gergő Szemes; FTC	Dániel Róbert Kiss; BHSE Bálint Mátyás; Törekvés
Team foil	Törekvés; Dániel Dósa; Benjamin Frűhauf; Bálint Mátyás; Andor Mihályi	FTC; Soma Horváth; Kristóf Szabados; Bence Széki; Gergő Szemes	BHSE; Gábor Bellovicz; Dániel Róbert Kiss; Tamás Liszkai; András Németh
Individual sabre	Áron Szilágyi; Vasas	Tamás Decsi; KVSE	Bálint Kossuth; UTE Miklós Péch; MTK
Team sabre	MTK; Nikolász Iliász; István Kovács; Miklós Péch; András Szatmári	Vasas; Tamás Galgóczy; Pál Nagy; Krisztián Rabb; Áron Szilágyi	GEAC; Bence Gémesi; Csanád Gémesi; Huba Gémesi; Ferenc Valkai

=== Women's ===
Event	Gold	Silver	Bronze
Individual épée	Eszter Muhari; BHSE	Anna Kun; OMS-Tata	Réka Szabó; AVA Kata Mihályi; Békéssy Debrecen
Team épée	OMS-Tata; Lili Büki; Tamara Gnám; Sarolta Kovács; Anna Kun	BVSC; Emma Borsodi; Julianna Révész; Laura Szabó; Bianka Turcsák	BHSE; Dorina Budai; Eszter Muhari; Barbara Szombath; Vivien Várnai
Individual foil	Fanni Kreiss; UTE	Kata Kondricz; BHSE	Fruzsina Zámbó-Gólya; UTE Flóra Pásztor; Törekvés
Team foil	UTE; Fanni Kreiss; Viktória Mesteri; Aida Mohamed; Fruzsina Zámbó-Gólya	Törekvés; Erika Nekifor; Flóra Pásztor; Szonja Szalai; Janka Tóth	BHSE; Orsolya Balogh; Kata Kondricz; Dóra Lupkovics; Anna Szántay
Individual sabre	Liza Pusztai; BVSC	Anna Márton; MTK	Petra Záhonyi; Kárpáti Dorottya Bérczy; BVSC
Team sabre	BVSC; Dorottya Bérczy; Fanni Pócz-Nagy; Liza Pusztai; Luca Szűcs	BHSE; Júlia Mikulik; Valentína Nagy; Brigitta Péntek; Kata Várhelyi	MTK; Daria Antonova; Nóra Garam; Judit Gárdos; Anna Márton

== Medal table ==
Rank	Team	Gold	Silver	Bronze	Total
1	BHSE	2	3	4	9
2	BVSC	2	2	2	6
3	Vasas	2	1	2	5
3	Törekvés	2	1	2	5
5	UTE	2	0	2	4
6	MTK	1	1	2	4
7	OMS-Tata	1	1	0	2
8	FTC	0	2	0	2
9	KVSE	0	1	0	1
10	GEAC	0	0	1	1
10	AVA	0	0	1	1
10	Békéssy Debrecen	0	0	1	1
10	Kárpáti	0	0	1	1
Total		12	12	18	42

== Results ==
=== Men ===
==== Épée individual (men) ====
Position	Name	Club
1st place, gold medalist(s)	Dávid Nagy	Vasas
2nd place, silver medalist(s)	András Peterdi	BHSE
3rd place, bronze medalist(s)	Tibor Andrásfi	BVSC
3rd place, bronze medalist(s)	Máté Koch	Vasas
5.	Zsombor Bányai	Vasas
6.	Zsombor Keszthelyi	AVA
7.	Péter Somfai	BHSE
8.	Dániel Berta	BHSE

Quarter-finals
Zsombor Bányai	11
András Peterdi	15
Péter Somfai	9
Tibor Andrásfi	15
Máté Koch	15
Zsombor Keszthelyi	14
Dániel Berta	6
Dávid Nagy	15

Semi-finals
András Peterdi	15
Tibor Andrásfi	8
Dániel Dósa	10
Dávid Nagy	15

Final
András Peterdi	12
Dávid Nagy	15

===== Épée team (men) =====
Quarter-finals
Vasas	45
Tapolca	33
Vasas 2	26
BVSC	45
BHSE 2	45
PTE-PEAC	21
OMS-Tata	30
BHSE	45

Semi-finals
Vasas	37
BVSC	44
BHSE 2	32
BHSE	45

Final
BVSC	35
BHSE	37

==== Foil individual (men) ====
Position	Name	Club
1st place, gold medalist(s)	Dániel Dósa	Törekvés
2nd place, silver medalist(s)	Gergő Szemes	FTC
3rd place, bronze medalist(s)	Dániel Róbert Kiss	BHSE
3rd place, bronze medalist(s)	Bálint Mátyás	Törekvés
5.	Gábor Bellovicz	BHSE
6.	Tamás Mendrey	UTE
7.	Mátyás Maior	Törekvés
8.	Benjamin Frűhauf	Törekvés

Quarter-finals
Gábor Bellovicz	6
Bálint Mátyás	15
Tamás Mendrey
Gergő Szemes	wo.
Dániel Dósa	15
Mátyás Maior	10
Dániel Róbert Kiss	15
Benjamin Frűhauf	14

Semi-finals
Bálint Mátyás	8
Gergő Szemes	15
Dániel Dósa	15
Dániel Róbert Kiss	11

Final
Gergő Szemes	10
Dániel Dósa	15

===== Foil team (men) =====
Quarter-finals
Törekvés	45
BHSE 2	37
Budakalász	23
UTE	45
BHSE	45
Törekvés 2	23
UTE 2	17
FTC	45

Semi-finals
Törekvés	45
UTE	20
BHSE	39
FTC	45

Final
Törekvés	45
FTC	23
Third place
UTE	38
BHSE	45

==== Sabre individual (men) ====
Position	Name	Club
1st place, gold medalist(s)	Áron Szilágyi	Vasas
2nd place, silver medalist(s)	Tamás Decsi	KVSE
3rd place, bronze medalist(s)	Bálint Kossuth	UTE
3rd place, bronze medalist(s)	Miklós Péch	MTK
5.	Csanád Gémesi	GEAC
6.	András Szatmári	MTK
7.	Bence Gémesi	GEAC
8.	Lehel György	UTE

Quarter-finals
Áron Szilágyi	15
András Szatmári	12
Bence Gémesi	10
Miklós Péch	15
Csanád Gémesi	10
Tamás Decsi	15
Bálint Kossuth	15
Lehel György	14

Semi-finals
Áron Szilágyi	15
Miklós Péch	10
Tamás Decsi	15
Bálint Kossuth	12

Final
Áron Szilágyi	15
Tamás Decsi	6

===== Sabre team (men) =====
Quarter-finals
MTK	45
Kárpáti	18
KVSE	37
GEAC	45
Vasas	45
BVSC	32
TFSE	18
UTE	45

Semi-finals
MTK	45
GEAC	38
Vasas	45
UTE	33

Final
MTK	45
Vasas	37
Third place
GEAC	45
UTE	21

=== Women ===
==== Épée individual (women) ====
Position	Name	Club
1st place, gold medalist(s)	Eszter Muhari	BHSE
2nd place, silver medalist(s)	Anna Kun	OMS-Tata
3rd place, bronze medalist(s)	Kata Mihályi	Békéssy Debrecen
3rd place, bronze medalist(s)	Réka Szabó	AVA
5.	Kinga Nagy	DVE
6.	Laura Szabó	BVSC
7.	Tamara Gnám	TSC
8.	Zsófia Nyikos	Vasas

Quarter-finals
Réka Szabó	15
Kinga Nagy	11
Tamara Gnám	13
Eszter Muhari	15
Zsófia Nyikos	9
Kata Mihályi	15
Laura Szabó	7
Anna Kun	15

Semi-finals
András Peterdi	13
Eszter Muhari	15
Kata Mihályi	12
Anna Kun	15

Final
Eszter Muhari	15
Anna Kun	11

===== Épée team (women) =====
Quarter-finals
BHSE	40
DVE	37
Békéssy Debrecen	42
BVSC	45
Vasas 2	45
MTK	35
OMS-Tata	45
AVA	40

Semi-finals
BHSE	26
BVSC	31
Vasas 2	32
OMS-Tata	45

Final
BVSC	35
OMS-Tata	45
Third place
BHSE	45
Vasas 2	39

==== Foil individual (women) ====
Position	Name	Club
1st place, gold medalist(s)	Fanni Kreis	UTE
2nd place, silver medalist(s)	Kata Kondricz	BHSE
3rd place, bronze medalist(s)	Flóra Pásztor	Törekvés
3rd place, bronze medalist(s)	Fruzsina Zámbó-Gólya	UTE
5.	Viktória Mesteri	UTE
6.	Anna Pöltz	MTK
7.	Janka Tóth	Törekvés
8.	Andrea Bernát	UTE

Quarter-finals
Janka Tóth	7
Kata Kondricz	15
Fruzsina Zámbó-Gólya	15
Viktória Mesteri	12
Fanni Kreis	15
Anna Pöltz	13
Andrea Bernát	6
Flóra Pásztor	15

Semi-finals
Kata Kondricz	15
Fruzsina Zámbó-Gólya	7
Fanni Kreis	15
Flóra Pásztor	14

Final
Kata Kondricz	6
Fanni Kreis	15

===== Foil team (women) =====
Quarter-finals
Törekvés	45
FTC 2	16
FTC	31
MTK	35
BHSE	45
TUS	33
BHSE 2	27
UTE	45

Semi-finals
Törekvés	45
MTK	36
BHSE	37
UTE	45

Final
Törekvés	35
UTE	45
Third place
MTK	35
BHSE	45

==== Sabre individual (women) ====
Position	Name	Club
1st place, gold medalist(s)	Liza Pusztai	BVSC
2nd place, silver medalist(s)	Anna Márton	MTK
3rd place, bronze medalist(s)	Dorottya Bérczy	BVSC
3rd place, bronze medalist(s)	Petra Záhonyi	Kárpáti
5.	Kata Várhelyi	BHSE
6.	Renáta Katona	Vasas
7.	Luca László	UTE
8.	Júlia Mikulik	BHSE

Quarter-finals
Anna Márton	15
Júlia Mikulik	5
Dorottya Bérczy	15
Renáta Katona	10
Liza Pusztai	15
Luca László	7
Petra Záhonyi	15
Kata Várhelyi	9

Semi-finals
Anna Márton	15
Dorottya Bérczy	2
Liza Pusztai	15
Petra Záhonyi	6

Final
Anna Márton	13
Liza Pusztai	15

===== Sabre team (women) =====
Quarter-finals
BVSC	45
GEAC	30
MTK	45
UTE	18
Vasas	45
TFSE	35
Kárpáti	31
BHSE	45

Semi-finals
BVSC	45
MTK	38
Vasas	28
BHSE	45

Final
BVSC	45
BHSE	36
Third place
MTK	45
Vasas	27

== See also ==
- Hungarian Fencing Championships
- Hungarian Fencing Federation
