= Hungarian Fencing Federation =

Sports governing body in Hungary

- Sport: Fencing
- Jurisdiction: Hungary
- Abbreviation: MVSZ
- Founded: 1914
- Affiliation: FIE
- Affiliation date: 1917
- Regional affiliation: EFC
- Headquarters: Budapest
- President: Zsolt Csampa

Official website
- hunfencing.hu
- (Hungary)

The Hungarian Fencing Federation (Hungarian: Magyar Vívó Szövetség, pronounced [ˈmɒɟɒr ˈviːvoː ˈsøvɛt͡ʃːeːɡ], MVSZ) is the national organization for fencing in Hungary. It was founded in 1914 and has been affiliated to the International Fencing Federation since 1917. Its headquarters is in Budapest.

Hungary has hosted the World Fencing Championships five times (in 1959, 1975, 1991, 2000, and 2013). The chairman of the Hungarian Fencing Federation is Zsolt Csampa (since 2012).

== Current officers ==
- President: Zsolt Csampa
- General vice president: Jenő Kamuti
- Vice president: Antal Perczel
- Professional vice president: Lajos Szlovenszky
- Secretary: Pál Polgár

== International organizations in Hungary ==
World Championships:

- 1926 World Fencing Championships – Budapest
- 1933 World Fencing Championships – Budapest
- 1959 World Fencing Championships – Budapest
- 1975 World Fencing Championships – Budapest
- 1991 World Fencing Championships – Budapest
- 2013 World Fencing Championships – Budapest
- 2019 World Fencing Championships – Budapest

European Championships:

- 1995 European Fencing Championships – Keszthely
- 2005 European Fencing Championships – Zalaegerszeg

== International achievements ==
Event	Gold medal	Silver medal	Bronze medal	Pos.
Olympic Games	35	22	26	3rd
World Championships	89	82	92	3rd
European Championships	28	30	39	3rd

=== Olympic Games ===
Accurate as of the conclusion of the 2020 Olympic Games.

Games	Athletes	Gold	Silver	Bronze	Total	Rank
1896 Athens	no competitors					
1900 Paris	5	0	0	0	0	–
1904 St. Louis	no competitors					
1908 London	8	2	1	0	3	2
1912 Stockholm	13	2	1	1	4	1
1920 Antwerp	did not participate					
1924 Paris	10	1	1	2	4	3
1928 Amsterdam	17	2	1	0	3	3
1932 Los Angeles	10	2	0	2	4	3
1936 Berlin	19	3	0	1	4	2
1948 London	18	3	0	2	5	2
1952 Helsinki	17	2	2	2	6	2
1956 Melbourne	18	2	1	1	4	2
1960 Rome	21	2	2	0	4	2
1964 Tokyo	20	4	0	0	4	1
1968 Mexico City	20	2	2	3	7	2
1972 Munich	19	2	4	2	6	1
1976 Montreal	18	1	0	2	3	4
1980 Moscow	18	0	2	3	5	4
1984 Los Angeles	did not participate					
1988 Seoul	20	1	0	2	3	5
1992 Barcelona	20	1	2	0	3	5
1996 Atlanta	15	0	1	2	3	5
2000 Sydney	13	1	0	0	1	5
2004 Athens	15	1	2	0	3	3
2008 Beijing	15	0	0	1	1	12
2012 London	4	1	0	0	1	5
2016 Rio de Janeiro	9	2	1	1	4	2
2020 Tokyo	10	1	1	1	3	4
Total		38	24	28	90	3

== Fencing clubs of Hungary ==
- Alföldi Vívó Akadémia (Békéscsaba)
- Angels Vívó Sportegyesület (Győr)
- SZ-L BAU Balaton Vívóklub (Tapolca)
- Benkő Kardvívó SE (Budapest)
- Budapesti Honvéd SE (Bp.)
- Budapest SE (Bp.)
- BVSC-Zugló (Bp.)
- Budavári Vívó Egylet (Bp.)
- Csepel Vívó Egyesület (Bp.)
- DHSE-PMD (Debrecen)
- Diák Vívóegyesület (Szigetszentmiklós)
- Diósgyőri Vívó Egyesület (Miskolc)
- Dózsavárosi DSE (Veszprém)
- Eger Városi Vívóklub (Eger)
- Építők SC (Bp.)
- Érdi Torna Club (Érd)
- Fénylakk Budakalászi Vívó SE (Budakalász)
- Galba Árpád Vívóegylet (Salgótarján)
- Gödöllői EAC (Gödöllő)
- Győri Szabadidő és Vívó Egyesület (Győr)
- Győrújbaráti DSE (Győrújbarát)
- Gyulai SE (Gyula)
- Hajdú Vitéz KSE (Hajdúhadház)
- Hiperaktív SE (Bp.)
- Hobbi Vívó SE (Bp.)
- Csomorkány SE (Hódmezővásárhely)
- Kárpáti Rudolf Vívó Klub (Bp.)
- Kecskeméti Repülő és Vívó SE (Kecskemét)
- Kertvárosi Vívó SE (Bp.)
- Kitörés Vívó Klub (Szentendre)
- Körmendi Vívó SC (Körmend)
- Kunszentmiklósi Diák Vívó SE (Kunszentmiklós)
- Lőrinc 2000 Szabadidő SE (Maglód)
- MTK Budapest (Bp.)
- Nagykanizsai TE 1866 (Nagykanizsa)
- NKE SE-Tiszti Vívóklub (Bp.)
- Nyíregyházi Vasutas SC (Nyíregyháza)
- Óbudai FLESS SE (Bp.)
- Orvosegyetem SC (Bp.)
- Pásztói Szabadidő SE (Pásztó)
- Penge Vívóakadémia (Salgótarján)
- PTE-PEAC (Pécs)
- Pécsi Sport Nonprofit Zrt. (Pécs)
- QPAC Bencés DSE (Pannonhalma)
- S.A.G.A. Európai Harcművészetek Iskolája SE (Bp.)
- Sárvári Vívóképző SE (Sárvár)
- Soproni Líceumi Vívóegylet (Sopron)
- Szegedi Gumigyár SE (Szeged)
- SZTE Vívó Klub (Szeged)
- Székesfehérvári Vívó és Szabadídő SE (Székesfehérvár)
- Szekszárdi Kórház SK (Szekszárd)
- Szentesi VSC (Szentes)
- Szent György Vívó Egyesület (Esztergom)
- Szent László Vívóegyesület (Kesztölc)
- Szigetszentmiklósi Tőregylet (Szigetszentmiklós)
- Szolnoki MÁV SE (Szolnok)
- Szolnoki Sportcentrum Nonprofit Zrt. (Szolnok)
- Szombathelyi Vívóakadémia SE (Szombathely)
- Szőlőskert Nagyréde SC (Nagyréde)
- OMS-Tata (Tata)
- Tatabányai SC (Tatabánya)
- Testnevlési Egyetem SE (Bp.)
- Törökbálinti TC (Törökbálint)
- TUS Sport és Business Nonprofit Kft. (Bp.)
- Telki SE (Telki)
- Terézvárosi Diáksport és Vívó Egylet (Bp.)
- Törekvés SE (Bp.)
- Univer-Sport (Kecskemét)
- Újpesti TE (Bp.)
- Váci Reménység Egyesület (Vác)
- Vasas SC (Bp.)
- Veszprémi Egyetemi SC (Veszprém)
- Veresegyház VSK (Veresegyház)
- Zalaegerszegi Vívó Egylet (Zalaegerszeg)
- Zsoldos Péter Vívó Egyesület (Orosháza)

=== Point classification for Hungarian clubs (2015) ===
Sabre

#	Club	Point
1	Vasas Sport Club	15575.5
2	MTK	14636
3	BVSC-Zugló	10331
4	Újpesti Torna Egylet	8607.5
5	Gödöllői EAC	4757
6	Kárpáti Rudolf Vívó Klub	4456
7	Kertvárosi Vívó Sport Egyesület	3443.5
8	NTE 1866 Vívó Szakosztály	2025
9	Diák Vívóegyesület	1835
10	TFSE	1512

Foil

#	Club	Point
1	Budapesti Honvéd Sportegyesület	21148
2	Újpesti Torna Egylet	15354
3	Törekvés SE	12044
4	MTK	4190
5	Terézvárosi Diáksport Vívó Egyesület	4070
6	Építők SC	2600
7	Fénylakk Budakalászi Vívó SE	1450
8	Zalaegerszegi Vívó Egylet	1049
9	Csomorkány Sport Egyesület	912
10	Szegedi Tudományegyetem Vívó Klub	851

Épée

#	Club	Point
1	Budapesti Honvéd Sportegyesület	20381.5
2	Vasas Sport Club	16646.5
3	SZ-L BAU Balaton Vívóklub	8962
4	BVSC-Zugló	8429.5
5	OMS-Tata	5989
6	MTK	3608
7	Alföldi Vívó Akadémia	3476
8	DHSE-PMD	2007.5
9	PTE-PEAC	1624
10	Diósgyőri Vívó Egyesület	1517.5

== Presidents ==
- 1914–1927: Pál Beöthy, (Chief executive: Béla Nagy, 1914–1924)
- 1927–1932: Iván Rakovszky, (Chief executive: Géza Krencsei)
- 1932–1943: Archduke Albrecht Franz, Duke of Teschen, (Chief executive: Béla Nagyszombati)
- 1943–1945: András Vincze
- 1945–1948: Lajos Szilaveczky, (Chief executive: Sándor Gombos)
- 1948–1960: János Soproni Sporer
- 1960–1964: György Csanády
- 1964–1968: Pál Kovács
- 1968–1972: László Eperjesi
- 1972–1980: Mihály Tömpe
- 1980–1984: Péter Bakonyi
- 1984–1994: Jenő Kamuti
- 1994–1998: György Kertai
- 1998–2008: György Gémesi
- 2008–2012: János Erős
- since 2012: Zsolt Csampa

== See also ==
- Hungary national fencing team
- Hungarian Fencer of the Year
