= Ilse Keydel =

German fencer

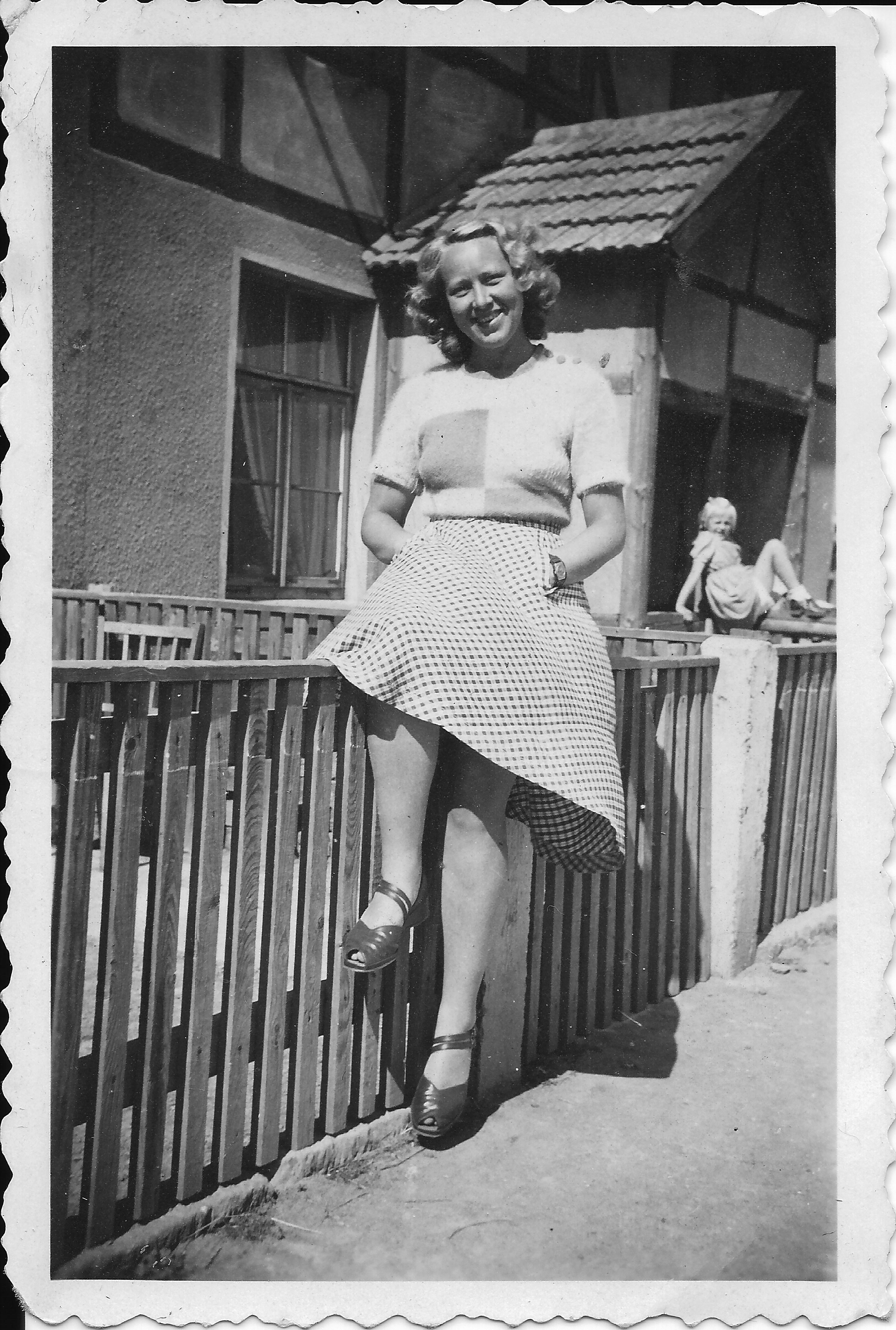

Personal information
- Born: 11 February 1921 Hannover, Germany
- Died: 5 May 2003 (aged 82) Hannover

Sport
- Sport: Fencing
Medal record
Representing West Germany
World Fencing Championships
Bronze medal – third place	1953 Brussels	Individual foil
Silver medal – second place	1957 Paris	Team foil
Silver medal – second place	1958 Philadelphia	Team foil

Ilse Keydel (11 February 1921 in Hannover, Germany – 5 May 2003 in Hannover) was a German fencer who won three medals in the foil events at world championships. Her bronze medal in 1953 was the first West Germany medal in fencing at world championships.
