= Ferenc Czvikovszki =

Hungarian fencer (1932–2021)

Personal information
- Born: 1 January 1932 Budapest, Hungary
- Died: 16 November 2021 (aged 89)

Sport
- Sport: Fencing
Medal record
Representing Hungary
World Championships
| Gold medal – first place | 1957 Paris | Team foil |
| Silver medal – second place | 1957 Paris | Team épée |
| Silver medal – second place | 1958 Philadelphia | Individual foil |
| Silver medal – second place | 1961 Turin | Team foil |
| Bronze medal – third place | 1959 Budapest | Team foil |
Summer Universiade
| Silver medal – second place | 1959 Turin | Team foil |

Ferenc Czvikovszki (1 January 1932 – 16 November 2021) was a Hungarian fencer. He competed in the team foil event at the 1960 Summer Olympics. He died in November 2021, at the age of 89.
