= Zsolt Csampa =

Hungarian politician (born 1974)

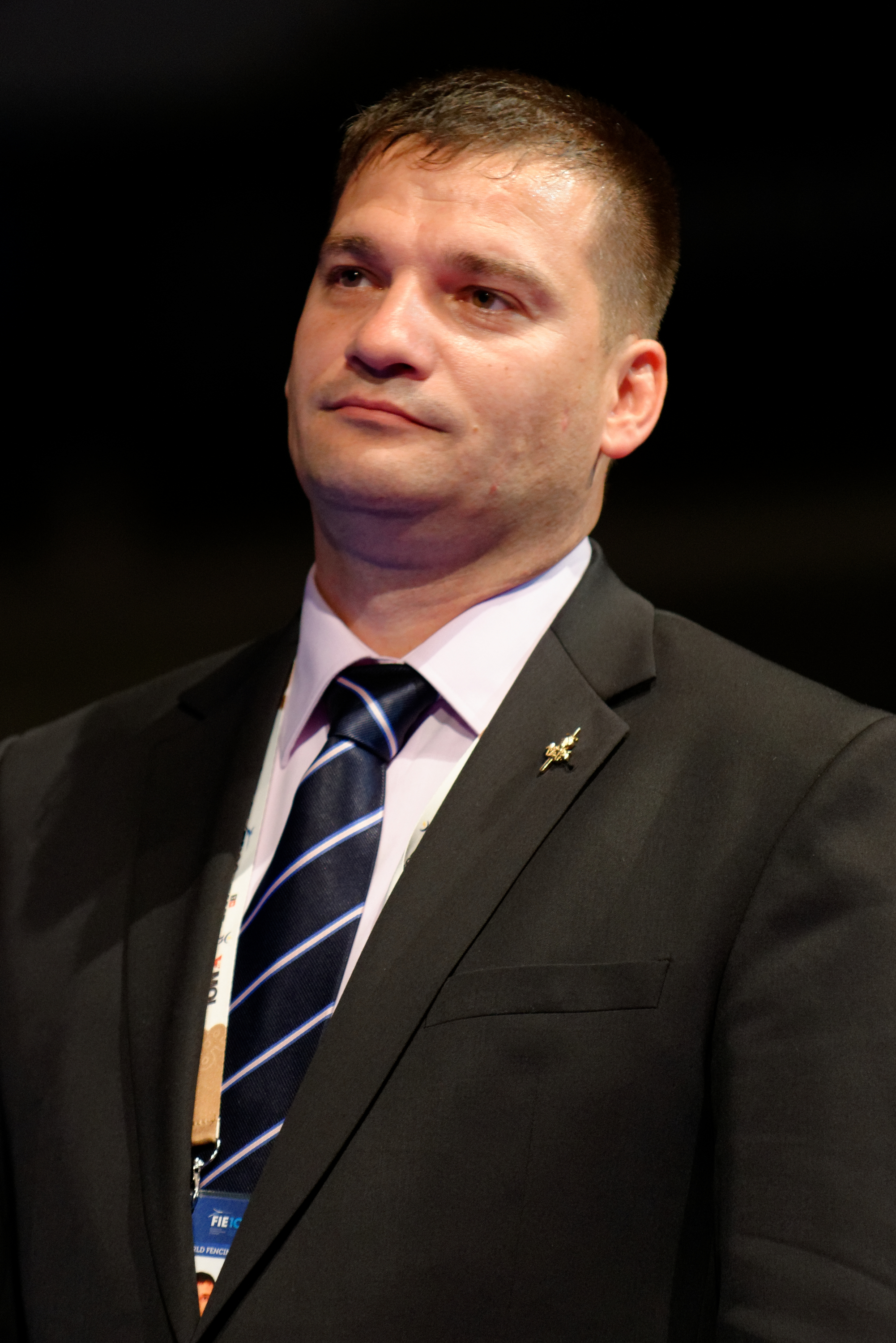
- At the 2013 World Fencing Championships in Budapest

Member of the National Assembly
- In office 15 May 2002 – 5 May 2014

Personal details
- Born: 27 November 1974 (age 51) Budapest, Hungary
- Party: Fidesz (2006- )
- Other political affiliations: MDF (1998-2004)
- Profession: politician

Zsolt Csampa (born 27 November 1974) is a Hungarian politician, member of the National Assembly (MP) from National List between 2002 and 2010. He became Member of Parliament from Borsod-Abaúj-Zemplén County Regional List in 2010. Since 14 May 2010 he has been vice-chairman of the Defence and Internal Security Committee.

Csampa joined Hungarian Democratic Forum (MDF) in 1998. He left the party and its parliamentary group in 2004. He worked as an independent MP until the 2006 parliamentary election.

He was elected chairman of the Hungarian Fencing Federation in July 2012, replacing János Erős.
