= Katalin Kiss =

Hungarian rhythmic gymnast

Stalin Kiss
- Born: January 3, 1982 (age 44) Budapest, Hungary

Gymnastics career
- Discipline: Rhythmic gymnastics
- Country represented: Hungary (1997-2005)
- Club: Csepel RG
- Head coach: Adrienn Kiss
- Retired: yes

Katalin Kiss (born 3 January 1982) is a retired Hungarian rhythmic gymnast.

== Biography ==
Trained by her sister Adrienn, Katalin made her international debut at the 1997 World Championships in Berlin, where she competed with rope and ribbon, taking 142nd place in the All-Around and 13th place in teams along Viktoria Frater, Orsolya Balogh and Dora Toth.

She again competed at the World Championships in 2003, being 20th in the team final with Petra Daróczi, Brigitta Haris and Zsófia Mészáros. The following year she took part in the European Championships in Kyiv, placing 35th in the All-Around and 20th in teams along Nikolett Királyvári and Fruzsina Benyó. In July 2004 she won the Hungarian Cup ahead of Királyvár and Benyó. In November she was crowned national champion.

In early 2005 she started working as a newsreader for Budapest's television. In April she competed at the European Championships in Moscow finishing 20th in teams and 35th in the All-Around. At the World Championships in Baku she was 25th in teams with Fruzsina Benyó and Orsolya Zsidi. In November she was 2nd at the Hungarian Cup, days later she again was the runner up at nationals.

In 2008 she performed rhythmic gymnastics exhibitions on a cruise, then joining a circus school in Beijing where she also became and aerialist. She appeared in shows during the 2008 Olympics and, from October 2008 she performed as an aerialist in the Budapest Grand Circus. Meanwhile, she trained with Rita Polákovits, Nikoletta Királyvár, Alexandra Demeter, and Julcsi Buda as a group in order to compete at the 2009 Universiade.

In recent years she's a member of the rhythmic gymnastics' committee in the Hungarian gymnastics federation.
