= Ildikó Pusztai =

Hungarian fencer

Personal information
- Born: 11 November 1964 (age 61) Szolnok, Hungary

Sport
- Sport: Fencing

Ildikó Pusztai (born 11 November 1964) is a Hungarian fencer. She competed in the women's team foil event at the 1992 Summer Olympics.
