= 1953 World Fencing Championships =

International fencing competition

1953 World Championships in Fencing
- Host city: Brussels, Belgium

The 1953 World Fencing Championships were held in Brussels, Belgium.

== Medal table ==
| Rank | Nation | Gold | Silver | Bronze | Total |
|---|---|---|---|---|---|
| 1 | Hungary (HUN) | 4 | 2 | 2 | 8 |
| 2 | Italy (ITA) | 2 | 3 | 3 | 8 |
| 3 | France (FRA) | 2 | 3 | 0 | 5 |
| 4 | Poland (POL) | 0 | 0 | 1 | 1 |
| 4 | Switzerland (SUI) | 0 | 0 | 1 | 1 |
| 4 | West Germany (FRG) | 0 | 0 | 1 | 1 |
| Totals (6 entries) | | 8 | 8 | 8 | 24 |

== Medal summary ==
=== Men's events ===
| Event | Gold | Silver | Bronze |
|---|---|---|---|
| Individual Foil | (France) Christian d'Oriola | (Italy) Edoardo Mangiarotti | (Italy) Manlio Di Rosa |
| Team Foil | France | Italy | Hungary |
| Individual Sabre | (Hungary) Pál Kovács | (Hungary) Aladár Gerevich | (Hungary) Rudolf Kárpáti |
| Team Sabre | Hungary | Italy | Poland |
| Individual Épée | (Hungary) József Sákovics | (Hungary) Barnabás Berzsenyi | (Italy) Fiorenzo Marini |
| Team Épée | Italy | France | Switzerland |

=== Women's events ===
| Event | Gold | Silver | Bronze |
|---|---|---|---|
| Individual Foil | (Italy) Irene Camber | (France) Renée Garilhe | (West Germany) Ilse Keydel |
| Team Foil | Hungary | France | Italy |
