= Margit Elek =

Hungarian fencer

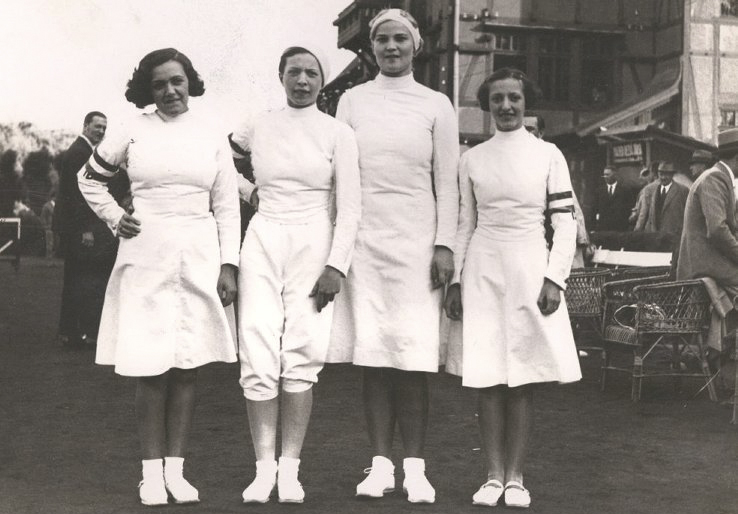
- Margit Danÿ, Ilona Elek, Erna Bogen and Margit Elek (1933)

Personal information
- Born: 5 May 1910 Budapest, Hungary
- Died: 4 February 1986 (aged 75) Budapest, Hungary

Sport
- Sport: Fencing
- Event: foil

Margit Elek (5 May 1910 – 4 February 1986) was a Hungarian Olympic foil fencer.

She was born in Budapest, Hungary, was the sister of Olympic champion Ilona Elek, and was Jewish. She competed in the women's individual foil events at the 1948 and 1952 Summer Olympics. She also won the silver medal at the 1934 World Fencing Championships.
