= Hajnalka Tóth =

Hungarian fencer (born 1976)

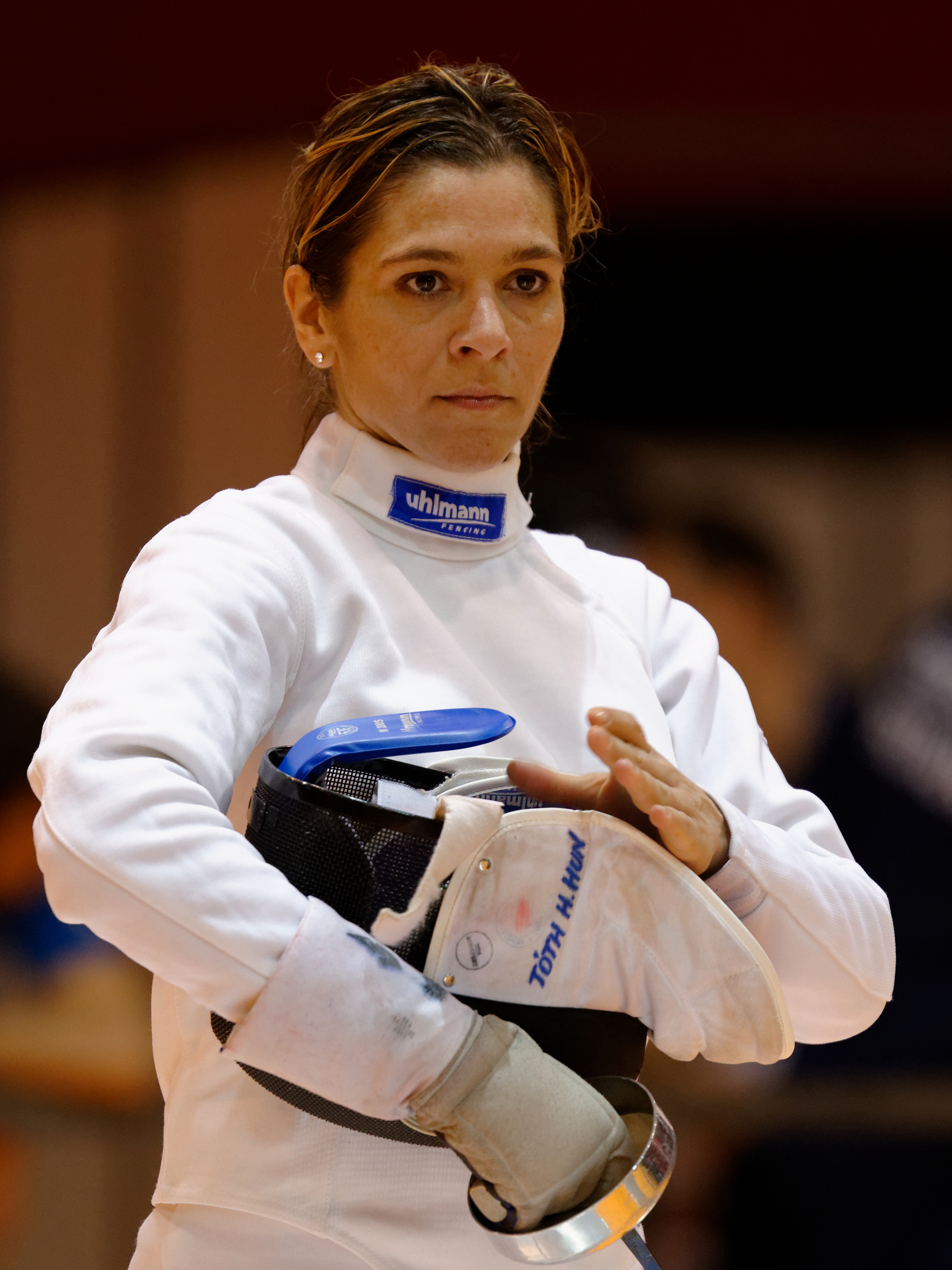
- At the 2014 European Fencing Championships

Personal information
- Born: 27 August 1976 (age 49) Békéscsaba, Hungary
- Height: 1.74 m (5 ft 9 in)
- Weight: 70 kg (150 lb)

Fencing career
- Sport: Fencing
- Weapon: Épée
- Hand: right-handed
- Club: Honvéd-LNX
- FIE ranking: current ranking
Medal record
Women's Épée
Representing Hungary
World Championships
Gold medal – first place	1999 Seoul	Team épée
Gold medal – first place	2002 Lisbon	Team épée
Silver medal – second place	2005 Leipzig	Team épée
Bronze medal – third place	1998 La Chaux-de-Fonds	Team épée
Bronze medal – third place	2001 Nîmes	Team épée
Bronze medal – third place	2003 Havana	Team épée
European Championships
Gold medal – first place	2001 Coblenz	Team épée
Silver medal – second place	2000 Madeira	Team épée
Silver medal – second place	2006 Izmir	Team épée
Silver medal – second place	2007 Zalaegerszeg	Team épée
Bronze medal – third place	1999 Bozen	Team épée

Hajnalka Tóth (born 27 August 1976) is a Hungarian fencer, team World champion in 1999 and 2002, team European champion in 2001. She competed in the women's team épée event at the 2004 Summer Olympics.
