= Emma Yefimova =

Soviet fencer

Personal information
- Born: 28 September 1931 Moscow, Russian SFSR, Soviet Union
- Died: 12 July 2004 (aged 72) Moscow, Russia

Sport
- Sport: Fencing

Emma Yefimova (Russian: Эмма Корнеевна Ефимова; 28 September 1931 – 12 July 2004) was a Soviet fencer. She competed in the women's individual foil event at the 1956 Summer Olympics.
