= Hungarian Fencer of the Year =

Hungarian Fencer of the Year awards are granted each year since 1964, Hungarian Fencing Federation (MVSZ) considers the winners.

== List of winners ==
| Year | Men | | Woman | |
| Year | Fencer | Weapon | Fencer | Weapon |
|---|---|---|---|---|
| 1964 | Tibor Pézsa | sabre | Ildikó Rejtő | foil |
| 1965 | Zoltán Nemere | épée | not awarded | |
| 1966 | Tibor Pézsa (2) | sabre | not awarded | |
| 1967 | not awarded | | Ildikó Bóbis | foil |
| 1968 | Győző Kulcsár | épée | Ildikó Rejtő (2) | foil |
| 1969 | János Kalmár | sabre | Ildikó Rejtő (3) | foil |
| 1970 | Tibor Pézsa (3) | sabre | Ildikó Rejtő (4) | foil |
| 1971 | Győző Kulcsár (2) | épée | Ildikó Rejtő (5) | foil |
| 1972 | Csaba Fenyvesi | épée, foil | Ildikó Bóbis (2) | foil |
| 1973 | Pál Gerevich | sabre | Ildikó Tordasi | foil |
| 1974 | Győző Kulcsár (3) | épée | Ildikó Bóbis (3) | foil |
| 1975 | Péter Marót | sabre | Ildikó Bóbis (4) | foil |
| 1976 | not awarded | | Ildikó Tordasi (2) | foil |
| 1977 | Pál Gerevich (2) | sabre | Ildikó Tordasi (3) | foil |
| 1978 | Imre Gedővári | sabre | not awarded | |
| 1979 | Ernő Kolczonay | épée, foil | Ildikó Tordasi (4) | foil |
| 1980 | Ernő Kolczonay (2) | épée, foil | Magda Maros | foil |
| 1981 | Zoltán Székely | épée | Edit Kovács | foil |
| 1982 | Péter Abay | sabre | Zsuzsanna Szőcs | foil |
| 1983 | Ernő Kolczonay (3) | épée, foil | Gertrúd Stefanek | foil |
| 1984 | Imre Gedővári (2) | sabre | Zsuzsa Jánosi | foil |
| 1985 | György Nébald | sabre | Zsuzsa Jánosi (2) | foil |
| 1986 | Imre Bujdosó | sabre | Zsuzsa Jánosi (3) | foil |
| 1987 | György Nébald (2) | sabre | Zsuzsa Jánosi (4) | foil |
| 1988 | György Nébald (3) | sabre | Zsuzsa Jánosi (5) | foil |
| 1989 | Bence Szabó | sabre | Dianna Eőri | épée |
| 1990 | György Nébald (4) | sabre | Dianna Eőri (2) | épée |
| 1991 | Péter Abay (2) | sabre | Mariann Horváth | épée |
| 1992 | Bence Szabó (2) | sabre | Mariann Horváth (2) | épée |
| 1993 | Bence Szabó (3) | sabre | Aida Mohamed | foil |
| 1994 | Bence Szabó (4) | sabre | Gyöngyi Szalay | épée |
| 1995 | Iván Kovács | épée | Gyöngyi Szalay (2) | épée |
| 1996 | Géza Imre | épée | Gyöngyi Szalay (3) | épée |
| 1997 | Domonkos Ferjancsik | sabre | Gyöngyi Szalay (4) | épée |
| 1998 | Attila Fekete | épée | Gyöngyi Szalay (5) | épée |
| 1999 | Domonkos Ferjancsik (2) | sabre | Ildikó Mincza | épée |
| 2000 | Domonkos Ferjancsik (3) | sabre | Tímea Nagy | épée |
| 2001 | Zsolt Nemcsik | sabre | Ildikó Mincza (2) | épée |
| 2002 | Gábor Boczkó | épée | Aida Mohamed (2) | foil |
| 2003 | Domonkos Ferjancsik (4) | sabre | Aida Mohamed (3) | foil |
| 2004 | Zsolt Nemcsik (2) | sabre | Tímea Nagy (2) | épée |
| 2005 | Zsolt Nemcsik (3) | sabre | Edina Knapek | foil |
| 2006 | Zsolt Nemcsik (4) | sabre | Tímea Nagy (3) | épée |
| 2007 | Krisztián Kulcsár | épée | Aida Mohamed (4) | foil |
| 2008 | Gábor Boczkó (2) | épée | Ildikó Mincza-Nébald (3) | épée |
| 2009 | Tamás Decsi | sabre | Orsolya Nagy | sabre |
| 2010 | Gábor Boczkó (3) | épée | Emese Szász | épée |
| 2011 | Áron Szilágyi | sabre | Edina Knapek (2) | foil |
| 2012 | Áron Szilágyi (2) | sabre | Aida Mohamed (5) | foil |
| 2013 | Gábor Boczkó (4) | épée | Emese Szász (2) | épée |
| 2014 | András Rédli | épée | Emese Szász (3) | épée |
| 2015 | Géza Imre (2) | épée | Emese Szász (4), Anna Márton | épée sabre |
| 2016 | Áron Szilágyi (3) | sabre | Emese Szász (5) | épée |
| 2017 | András Szatmári | sabre | Anna Márton (2) | sabre |
| 2018 | Áron Szilágyi (4) | sabre | Liza Pusztai | sabre |
| 2019 | Gergely Siklósi | épée | Anna Márton (3) | sabre |
| 2020 | Áron Szilágyi (5) | sabre | Liza Pusztai (2) | sabre |
| 2021 | Áron Szilágyi (6) | sabre | Anna Márton (4) | sabre |
| 2022 | Áron Szilágyi (7) | sabre | Liza Pusztai (3) | sabre |
| 2023 | Máté Tamás Koch | épée | Sugár Katinka Battai | sabre |

== Sources ==
- Antal Zoltán–Sass Tibor: A magyar sport kézikönyve. Az év sportolói (1958–1981), 866. o., Sport Kiadó, Budapest, 1983. ISBN 963-253-562-6
- A magyar sport évkönyve (1974-1993)
- Magyar sportévkönyv (1994-2010)
