= Gábor Totola =

Hungarian fencer (born 1973)

Personal information
- Born: 10 December 1973 (age 52) Budapest, Hungary

Sport
- Sport: Fencing
Medal record
Men's fencing
Representing Hungary
Olympic Games
Silver medal – second place	1992 Barcelona	Épée Team

Gábor Totola (born 10 December 1973) is a Hungarian fencer, who won a silver medal in the team Épée competition at the 1992 Summer Olympics in Barcelona together with Krisztián Kulcsár, Ferenc Hegedüs, Ernõ Kolczonay and Iván Kovács.
