= Ferenc Hegedűs (fencer) =

Hungarian fencer (born 1959)

Personal information
- Born: 14 September 1959 (age 66) Tarján, Hungary

Sport
- Sport: Fencing
Medal record
Men's fencing
Representing Hungary
Olympic Games
Silver medal – second place	1992 Barcelona	Épée Team

Ferenc Hegedűs (born 14 September 1959) is a Hungarian fencer, who won a silver medal in the team Épée competition at the 1992 Summer Olympics in Barcelona together with Krisztián Kulcsár, Gábor Totola, Ernõ Kolczonay and Iván Kovács.
