= Gábor Delneky =

Hungarian fencer (1932–2008)

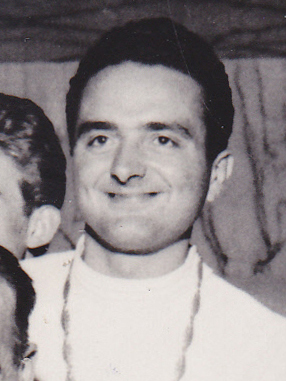
- Gábor Delneky (1960)

Personal information
- Born: 29 May 1932 Budapest, Hungary
- Died: 26 October 2008 (aged 76) Orlando, Florida, United States
- Height: 1.83 m (6 ft 0 in)
- Weight: 80 kg (176 lb)

Sport
- Sport: Fencing
- Club: Vasas, Budapest
Medal record
Representing Hungary
Olympic Games
Gold medal – first place	1960 Rome	Sabre, team
World Championships
Silver medal – second place	1959 Budapest	Sabre, team
Bronze medal – third place	1961 Turin	Sabre, team

Gábor Delneky (29 May 1932 – 26 October 2008) was a Hungarian fencer won a gold medal in the team sabre event at the 1960 Summer Olympics.

Delneky lost his parents at early age – his mother died when he was 10, and his father was placed in a military labor camp when he was 13. Delneky turned to sports and studies, and after graduating in civil engineering became the head of the engineering department at Viziterv, a Hungarian engineering firm. In 1969, he immigrated through Italy to the United States. There he received a master's degree in engineering at the University of Wisconsin at Milwaukee, and continued his engineering education in Florida and Illinois. He eventually became an American citizen and died in Florida, aged 76.
