= Judit Ágoston-Mendelényi =

Hungarian fencer (1937–2013)

Personal information
- Born: 21 January 1937 Miskolc, Hungary
- Died: 12 May 2013 (aged 76) Göd, Hungary

Sport
- Sport: Fencing
Medal record
Women's fencing
Representing Hungary
Olympic Games
Gold medal – first place	1964 Tokyo	Team foil
World Championships
Silver medal – second place	1961 Turin	Team foil
Silver medal – second place	1971 Vienna	Team foil
Bronze medal – third place	1969 Havana	Team foil
Summer Universiade
Silver medal – second place	1963 Porto Alegre	Team foil
Bronze medal – third place	1963 Porto Alegre	Individual foil

Judit Ágoston-Mendelényi (21 January 1937 – 12 May 2013) was a Hungarian fencer. She won a gold medal in the women's team foil event at the 1964 Summer Olympics.
