= Ildikó Rónay-Matuscsák =

Hungarian fencer (born 1946)

Personal information
- Born: 25 March 1946 (age 80) Budapest, Hungary

Sport
- Sport: Fencing
Medal record
Women's fencing
Representing Hungary
Olympic Games
Silver medal – second place	1972 Munich	Foil, Women's team

Ildikó Rónay-Matuscsák (born 25 March 1946) is a Hungarian fencer. She won a silver medal in the women's team foil at the 1972 Summer Olympics.
