= Rudolf Kárpáti =

Hungarian fencer (1920–1999)

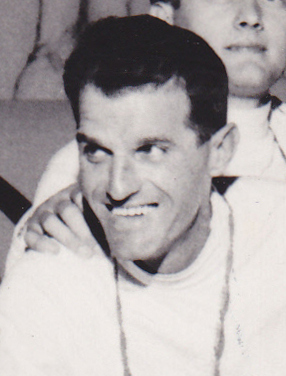
- Kárpáti at the 1960 Olympics

Personal information
- Born: 17 July 1920 Budapest, Hungary
- Died: 1 February 1999 (aged 78) Budapest, Hungary
- Height: 1.79 m (5 ft 10 in)
- Weight: 64 kg (141 lb)

Fencing career
- Sport: Fencing
- Weapon: sabre
- Hand: right-handed
- Club: Bp. Honvéd
Medal record
Representing Hungary
Olympic Games
Gold medal – first place	1948 London	Team
Gold medal – first place	1952 Helsinki	Team
Gold medal – first place	1956 Melbourne	Team
Gold medal – first place	1956 Melbourne	Individual
Gold medal – first place	1960 Rome	Individual
Gold medal – first place	1960 Rome	Team
World Championships
Gold medal – first place	Brussels 1953	Team
Gold medal – first place	Luxembourg 1954	Individual
Gold medal – first place	Luxembourg 1954	Team
Gold medal – first place	Rome 1955	Team
Gold medal – first place	Paris 1957	Team
Gold medal – first place	Philadelphia 1958	Team
Gold medal – first place	Budapest 1959	Individual
Silver medal – second place	Rome 1955	Individual
Silver medal – second place	Paris 1957	Individual
Silver medal – second place	Budapest 1959	Team
Bronze medal – third place	Brussels 1953	Individual
Bronze medal – third place	Turin 1961	Team

Rudolf Kárpáti (17 July 1920 – 1 February 1999) was a fencer from Hungary, who won six gold medals in sabre at four Olympic Games (1948–1960). He also won seven gold, three silver and two bronze medals at the world championships. For his achievements he was named Hungarian Sportsman of the year in 1959 and 1960.

Kárpáti graduated from the National Conservatory majoring in the history of music; he was also an accomplished violinist and the artistic director of the People's Army Central Artistic Ensemble (1961–1986). Besides fencing and music, he was an employee at the Hungarian State Credit Bank and an officer with the Hungarian Army – he retired as Colonel, and later in 1990 was promoted to Major General.

Kárpáti was a member of the Hungarian Fencing Federation from 1961 to 1991. After retiring from competitions, in 1977 he became president of the Budapest Fencing Federation and an administrator with the Fédération Internationale d'Escrime.

== See also ==
- List of multiple Olympic gold medalists
- List of multiple Olympic gold medalists in one event

Awards
Preceded by Imre Polyák	Hungarian Sportsman of The Year; 1959–1960	Succeeded by György Gurics
