= Bertalan Papp =

Hungarian fencer (1913–1992)

Personal information
- Born: 7 September 1913 Tiszaföldvár, Hungary
- Died: 8 August 1992 (aged 78) Budapest, Hungary

Sport
- Sport: Fencing
Medal record
Men's fencing
Representing Hungary
Olympic Games
Gold medal – first place	1948 London	Sabre, team
Gold medal – first place	1952 Helsinki	Sabre, team

Bertalan Papp (7 September 1913 – 8 August 1992) was a Hungarian fencer. He won two gold medals in the team sabre events at the 1948 and 1952 Summer Olympics.
