= Györgyi Marvalics-Székely =

Hungarian fencer (1924–2002)

Personal information
- Born: 1 December 1924 Nagykanizsa, Hungary
- Died: 18 July 2002 (aged 77)

Sport
- Sport: Fencing
Medal record
Women's fencing
Representing Hungary
Olympic Games
Silver medal – second place	1960 Rome	Women's Foil, team

Györgyi Marvalics-Székely (1 December 1924 – 18 July 2002) was a Hungarian fencer. She won a silver medal in the women's team foil event at the 1960 Summer Olympics.
