= János Kalmár =

Hungarian fencer (born 1942)

Personal information
- Born: 16 April 1942 (age 84) Budapest, Hungary

Sport
- Sport: Fencing
Medal record
Men's fencing
Representing Hungary
Olympic Games
Bronze medal – third place	1968 Mexico City	Sabre, team

János Kalmár (born 16 April 1942) is a Hungarian fencer. He won a bronze medal in the team sabre event at the 1968 Summer Olympics.
