= Tamás Mendelényi =

Hungarian fencer (1936–1999)

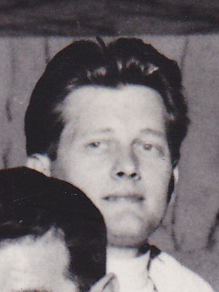
- in 1960

Personal information
- Born: 2 May 1936 Budapest, Hungary
- Died: 6 September 1999 (aged 63) Várgesztes, Hungary

Sport
- Sport: Fencing
Medal record
Representing Hungary
Olympic Games
Gold medal – first place	1960 Rome	Team sabre
World Championships
Gold medal – first place	1957 Paris	Team sabre
Gold medal – first place	1958 Philadelphia	Team sabre
Silver medal – second place	1959 Budapest	Individual sabre
Silver medal – second place	1959 Budapest	Team sabre
Silver medal – second place	1962 Buenos Aires	Team sabre
Bronze medal – third place	1957 Paris	Individual sabre
Bronze medal – third place	1961 Turin	Team sabre
Summer Universiade
Gold medal – first place	1959 Turin	Team sabre
Gold medal – first place	1961 Sofia	Team sabre

Tamás Mendelényi (2 May 1936 – 6 September 1999) was a Hungarian fencer. He won a gold medal in the team sabre event at the 1960 Summer Olympics.
