= Pál B. Nagy =

Hungarian fencer (born 1935)

Personal information
- Born: 2 May 1935 (age 91) Szolnok, Hungary

Sport
- Sport: Fencing
Medal record
Men's fencing
Representing Hungary
Olympic Games
Gold medal – first place	1968 Mexico City	Épée, team

Pál B. Nagy (born 2 May 1935) is a Hungarian fencer. He won a gold medal in the team épée event at the 1968 Summer Olympics.
