= 1959 World Fencing Championships =

Sporting event

1959 World Championships in Fencing
- Host city: (Hungarian People's Republic) Budapest, Hungary

The 1959 World Fencing Championships were held in Budapest, Hungary.

== Medal table ==
* Host nation (Hungary)

Rank	Nation	Gold	Silver	Bronze	Total
1	Soviet Union (URS)	3	3	3	9
2	Hungary (HUN)*	3	2	1	6
3	Great Britain (GBR)	1	1	0	2
4	Poland (POL)	1	0	1	2
5	France (FRA)	0	1	1	2
5	West Germany (FRG)	0	1	1	2
7	Italy (ITA)	0	0	1	1
Totals (7 entries)		8	8	8	24

== Medal summary ==
=== Men's events ===
Event	Gold	Silver	Bronze
Individual Foil	(United Kingdom) Allan Jay	(France) Claude Netter	(Soviet Union) Mark Midler
Team Foil	Soviet Union	West Germany	(Hungarian People's Republic) Hungary
Individual Sabre	(Hungarian People's Republic) Rudolf Kárpáti	(Hungarian People's Republic) Tamás Mendelényi	(Polish People's Republic) Jerzy Pawłowski
Team Sabre	(Polish People's Republic) Poland	(Hungarian People's Republic) Hungary	Soviet Union
Individual Épée	(Soviet Union) Bruno Kharbarov	(United Kingdom) Allan Jay	(Italy) Giuseppe Delfino
Team Épée	(Hungarian People's Republic) Hungary	Soviet Union	France

=== Women's events ===
Event	Gold	Silver	Bronze
Individual Foil	(Soviet Union) Emma Yefimova	(Soviet Union) Galina Gorokhova	(Soviet Union) Tatyana Petrenko-Samusenko
Team Foil	(Hungarian People's Republic) Hungary	Soviet Union	West Germany
