= Iván Kovács =

Hungarian fencer (born 1970)

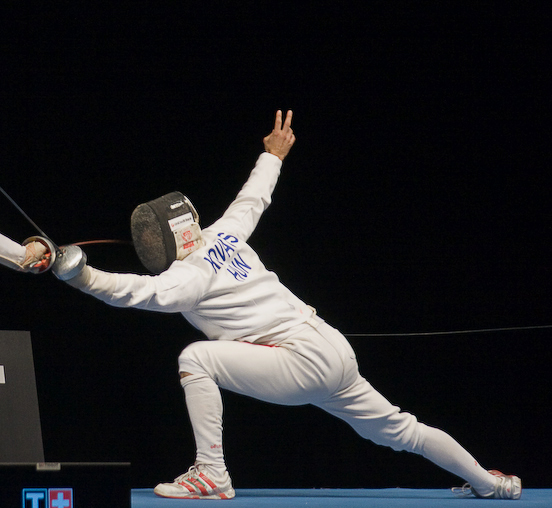

Personal information
- Born: 8 February 1970 (age 56) Budapest, Hungary
- Height: 1.84 m (6 ft 0 in)
- Weight: 85 kg (187 lb)

Fencing career
- Sport: Fencing
- Country: Hungary
- Weapon: épée
- Hand: left-handed
- Club: MTK Budapest; BVSC
- Head coach: Gábor Udvarhelyi
Medal record
Men's épée
Representing Hungary
| Event | 1st | 2nd | 3rd |
|---|---|---|---|
| Olympic Games | 0 | 2 | 0 |
| World Championships | 2 | 0 | 4 |
| European Championships | 5 | 2 | 2 |
| Total | 7 | 4 | 6 |
Olympic Games
| Silver medal – second place | 1992 Barcelona | Team |
| Silver medal – second place | 2004 Athens | Team |
World Championships
| Gold medal – first place | 1998 La Chaux-de-Fonds | Team |
| Gold medal – first place | 2001 Nîmes | Team |
| Bronze medal – third place | 1991 Budapest | Individual |
| Bronze medal – third place | 1993 Essen | Individual |
| Bronze medal – third place | 1995 The Hague | Team |
| Bronze medal – third place | 2007 St Petersburg | Team |
Summer Universiade
| Gold medal – first place | 1995 Fukuoka | Team |
| Silver medal – second place | 1993 Buffalo | Team |
| Bronze medal – third place | 1995 Fukuoka | Individual |

Iván Kovács (born 8 February 1970) is a Hungarian épée fencer, who won two Olympic silver medals in the team épée competition.
