= Mária Gulácsy =

Hungarian fencer (1941–2015)

Personal information
- Born: 27 April 1941 Beregszász, Hungary
- Died: 13 April 2015 (aged 73) Budapest, Hungary

Sport
- Sport: Fencing
Medal record
Women's fencing
Representing Hungary
Olympic Games
Silver medal – second place	1968 Mexico City	Foil, Women's team

Mária Gulácsy (27 April 1941 – 13 April 2015) was a Hungarian foil fencer. She won a silver medal in the women's team foil event at the 1968 Summer Olympics.
