= Attila Keresztes =

Hungarian fencer (1928–2002)

Personal information
- Born: 18 January 1928 Budapest, Hungary
- Died: 27 September 2002 (aged 74) Budapest, Hungary

Sport
- Sport: Fencing
Medal record
Men's fencing
Representing Hungary
Olympic Games
Gold medal – first place	1956 Melbourne	Sabre, team

Attila Keresztes (18 January 1928 – 27 September 2002) was a Hungarian fencer. He won a gold medal in the team sabre event at the 1956 Summer Olympics. After the 1956 Olympics, he defected and represented the United States at the 1964 Summer Olympics.

== See also ==
- List of USFA Division I National Champions
