= László Rajcsányi =

Hungarian fencer (1907–1992)

Personal information
- Born: 16 February 1907 Budapest, Austria-Hungary
- Died: 5 September 1992 (aged 85) Budapest, Hungary

Sport
- Sport: Fencing
Medal record
Men's fencing
Representing Hungary
Olympic Games
Gold medal – first place	1936 Berlin	Sabre, team
Gold medal – first place	1948 London	Sabre, team
Gold medal – first place	1952 Helsinki	Sabre, team

László Rajcsányi (16 February 1907 – 5 September 1992) was a Hungarian fencer. He won a gold medal in the team sabre event at the 1936, 1948 and 1952 Summer Olympics.
