= István Busa =

Hungarian fencer (born 1961)

Personal information
- Born: 31 May 1961 (age 65) Kecskemét, Hungary

Sport
- Sport: Fencing
Medal record
Men's fencing
Representing Hungary
Olympic Games
| Bronze medal – third place | 1988 Seoul | Foil, team |

István Busa (born 31 May 1961) is a Hungarian fencer. He won a bronze medal in the team foil event at the 1988 Summer Olympics.
