= Paula Marosi =

Hungarian fencer (1936–2022)

Personal information
- Born: 3 November 1936 Budapest, Hungary
- Died: 4 March 2022 (aged 85) Budapest, Hungary

Sport
- Sport: Fencing
Medal record
Women's fencing
Representing Hungary
Olympic Games
Gold medal – first place	1964 Tokyo	Women's foil, team
Silver medal – second place	1968 Mexico City	Women's foil, team

Paula Marosi (3 November 1936 – 4 March 2022) was a Hungarian fencer. She won a gold medal in the women's team foil event at the 1964 Summer Olympics. She won a silver in the same event at the 1968 Summer Olympics.

Marosi died in Budapest on 4 March 2022, at the age of 85.
