= Jenő Hámori (fencer) =

Hungarian fencer (1933–2025)

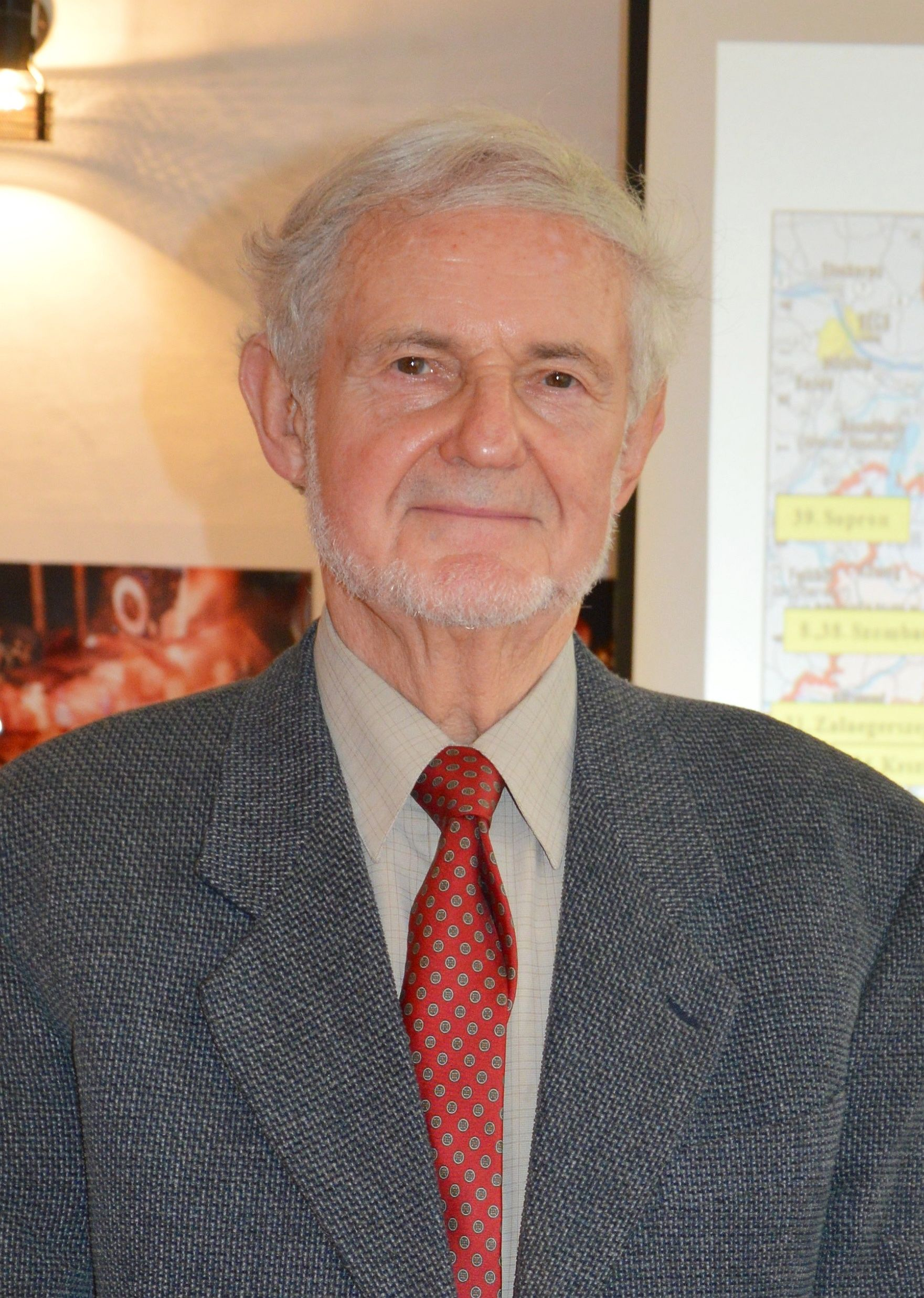
- Hámori in 2014

Personal information
- Born: 27 August 1933 Győr, Hungary
- Died: 23 November 2025 (aged 92)

Sport
- Sport: Fencing
Medal record
Men's fencing
Representing Hungary
Olympic Games
Gold medal – first place	1956 Melbourne	Sabre, team

Jenő Hámori (27 August 1933 – 23 November 2025) was a Hungarian fencer. He won a gold medal in the team sabre event at the 1956 Summer Olympics. After the 1956 Olympics, he defected to the United States amidst the Soviet invasion of Hungary and represented the U.S. at the 1964 Summer Olympics.

Hámori died on 23 November 2025, at the age of 92.

== See also ==
- List of USFA Division I National Champions
- List of USFA Hall of Fame members
