= 1957 World Fencing Championships =

International fencing competition

1957 World Championships in Fencing
- Host city: Paris, France

The 1957 World Fencing Championships were held in Paris, France.

== Medal table ==
* Host nation (France)

Rank	Nation	Gold	Silver	Bronze	Total
1	Hungary (HUN)	3	3	1	7
2	Italy (ITA)	2	0	3	5
3	France (FRA)*	1	1	0	2
3	Soviet Union (URS)	1	1	0	2
5	Poland (POL)	1	0	1	2
6	West Germany (FRG)	0	2	0	2
7	United States (USA)	0	1	0	1
8	Great Britain (GBR)	0	0	2	2
9	Austria (AUT)	0	0	1	1
Totals (9 entries)		8	8	8	24

== Medal summary ==
=== Men's events ===
Event	Gold	Silver	Bronze
Individual Foil	(Hungarian People's Republic) Mihály Fülöp	(Soviet Union) Mark Midler	(United Kingdom) Allan Jay
Team Foil	(Hungarian People's Republic) Hungary	France	Italy
Individual Sabre	(Polish People's Republic) Jerzy Pawłowski	(Hungarian People's Republic) Rudolf Kárpáti	(Hungarian People's Republic) Tamás Mendelényi
Team Sabre	(Hungarian People's Republic) Hungary	Soviet Union	(Polish People's Republic) Poland
Individual Épée	(France) Armand Mouyal	(Hungarian People's Republic) Gurgy Baranyi	(Italy) Franco Bertinetti
Team Épée	Italy	(Hungarian People's Republic) Hungary	(United Kingdom) Great Britain

=== Women's events ===
Event	Gold	Silver	Bronze
Individual Foil	(Soviet Union) Alexandra Zabelina	(West Germany) Heidi Schmid	(Italy) Irene Camber
Team Foil	Italy	West Germany	Austria
