= 1958 World Fencing Championships =

International fencing competition

1958 World Championships in Fencing
- Host city: Philadelphia, United States

The 1958 World Fencing Championships were held in Philadelphia, Pennsylvania, United States.

== Medal table ==
Rank	Nation	Gold	Silver	Bronze	Total
1	Soviet Union (URS)	3	4	1	8
2	Italy (ITA)	2	1	1	4
3	Hungary (HUN)	1	2	1	4
4	France (FRA)	1	0	3	4
5	Great Britain (GBR)	1	0	0	1
6	West Germany (FRG)	0	1	0	1
7	Poland (POL)	0	0	2	2
Totals (7 entries)		8	8	8	24

== Medal summary ==
=== Men's events ===
Event	Gold	Silver	Bronze
Individual Foil	(Italy) Giancarlo Bergamini	(Hungarian People's Republic) Ferenc Czvikovszki	(France) Bernard Baudoux
Team Foil	France	Soviet Union	Italy
Individual Sabre	(Soviet Union) Yakov Rylsky	(Soviet Union) David Tyshler	(Polish People's Republic) Jerzy Twardokens
Team Sabre	(Hungarian People's Republic) Hungary	Soviet Union	(Polish People's Republic) Poland
Individual Épée	(United Kingdom) Bill Hoskyns	(Italy) Edoardo Mangiarotti	(Soviet Union) Arnold Chernushevich
Team Épée	Italy	(Hungarian People's Republic) Hungary	France

=== Women's events ===
Event	Gold	Silver	Bronze
Individual Foil	(Soviet Union) Valentina Kiselyova	(Soviet Union) Emma Yefimova	(Hungarian People's Republic) Ildikó Újlaky-Rejtő
Team Foil	Soviet Union	West Germany	France
