= Zsuzsanna Szőcs =

Hungarian fencer (born 1962)

Personal information
- Born: 10 April 1962 (age 64) Budapest, Hungary

Sport
- Sport: Fencing
Medal record
Women's fencing
Representing Hungary
Olympic Games
Bronze medal – third place	1980 Moscow	Foil Team
Bronze medal – third place	1988 Seoul	Foil Team

Zsuzsanna Szőcs (born 10 April 1962) is a Hungarian fencer, who won two Olympic medals in the foil team competitions. Among her trainers was her father, Bertalan Szőcs.

She won the World Championship four times in 1987, 1989, 1991 and 1992.
