= Fencing at the 1980 Summer Olympics – Men's épée =

Fencing at the Olympics

Men's épée at the Games of the XXII Olympiad
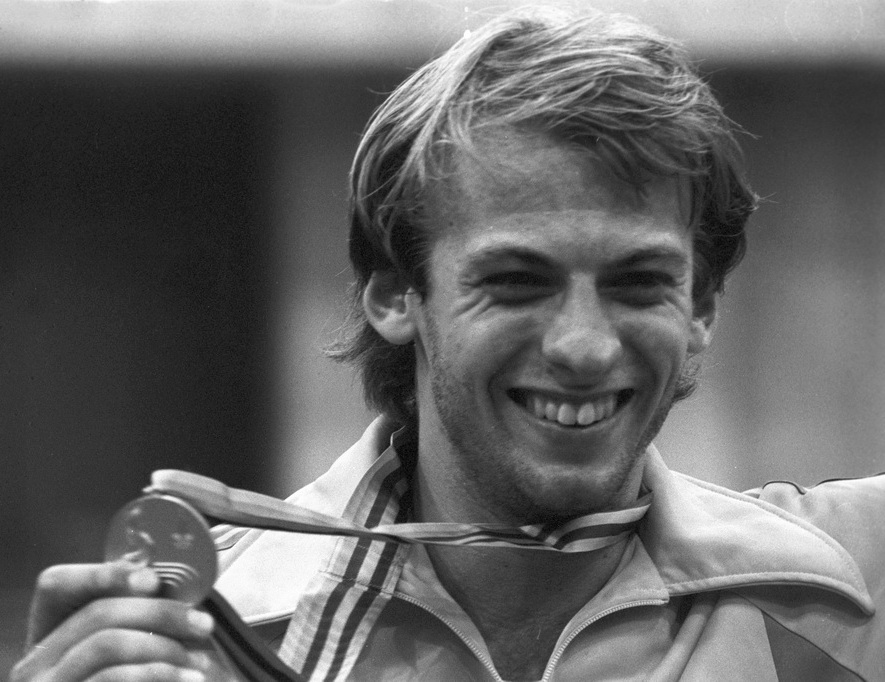
- Gold medalist Johan Harmenberg
- Venue: CSKA Sports Complex
- Dates: 27–28 July 1980
- Competitors: 42 from 16 nations

Medalists
1st place, gold medalist(s)		Johan Harmenberg; Sweden
2nd place, silver medalist(s)		Ernő Kolczonay; Hungary
3rd place, bronze medalist(s)		Philippe Riboud; France

The men's épée was one of eight fencing events on the fencing at the 1980 Summer Olympics programme. It was the eighteenth appearance of the event. The competition was held from 27 to 28 July 1980. 42 fencers from 16 nations competed. Each nation was limited to 3 fencers. The event was won by Johan Harmenberg of Sweden, the nation's first victory in the event and first medal of any color in the men's individual épée since 1924. Silver went to Ernő Kolczonay of Hungary, extending the nation's podium streak to four Games despite the retirement of three-time medalist Győző Kulcsár. Philippe Riboud of France took bronze. Sweden's Rolf Edling, a two-time World Champion, made his third final in the event, but once again missed the podium.

== Background ==
This was the 18th appearance of the event, which was not held at the first Games in 1896 (with only foil and sabre events held) but has been held at every Summer Olympics since 1900.

With West Germany boycotting the Games and Győző Kulcsár retiring, none of the 1976 medalists returned. Two of the other three finalists did, however: fourth-place finisher István Osztrics of Hungary and sixth-place finisher (as well as 1972 finalist) Rolf Edling of Sweden. Philippe Riboud of France was the reigning (1979) World Champion; Sweden's Johan Harmenberg had won in 1977 and Edling had been World Champion in 1973 and 1974. (The 1975 and 1978 World Champion and 1976 Olympic champion, Alexander Pusch, was from the boycotting West Germany.)

Kuwait made its debut in the event. Belgium, France, Great Britain, and Sweden each appeared for the 16th time, tying the absent United States for most among nations.

== Competition format ==
The 1980 tournament continued to use the mix of pool and knockout rounds used in 1968 and 1976. The competition included two pool rounds, followed by a double-elimination knockout round, finishing with a final pool round. In each pool round, the fencers competed in a round-robin.

Bouts in the round-robin pools were to 5 touches; bouts in the double-elimination round were to 10 touches. No barrages were held.

- Round 1: 8 pools of 5 or 6 fencers each. The top 3 in each pool (24 total) advanced.
- Round 2: 4 pools of 6 fencers each. The top 4 in each pool (16 total) advanced.
- Elimination rounds: A double-elimination tournament. The 4 fencers who won in both of the first two rounds advanced, as did the 2 fencers who reached the end of the repechage.
- Final round: 1 pool of 6 fencers.

== Schedule ==
All times are Moscow Time (UTC+3)

Date	Time	Round
Sunday, 27 July 1980		Round 1
Monday, 28 July 1980		Round 2 Elimination rounds Final

== Results ==
=== Round 1 ===
==== Round 1 Pool A ====
Pos	Fencer	W	L	TF	TA	Notes	PJ	PR	SG	JP	PP
1	Piotr Jabłkowski (POL)	3	1	18	10	Q		3–5	5–0	5–1	5–4
2	Philippe Riboud (FRA)	3	1	18	14	Q	5–3		3–5	5–4	5–2
3	Stéphane Ganeff (BEL)	3	1	15	12	Q	0–5	5–3		5–2	5–2
4	José Pérez (ESP)	1	3	12	19		1–5	4–5	2–5		5–4
5	Peder Planting (FIN)	0	4	12	20		4–5	2–5	2–5	4–5	

Source: Official Report, vol. 3, p. 251

==== Round 1 Pool B ====
Pos	Fencer	W	L	TF	TA	Notes	PB	AA	RE	MS	TS
1	Philippe Boisse (FRA)	3	1	19	12	Q		4–5	5–3	5–1	5–3
2	Aleksandr Abushakhmetov (URS)	3	1	18	12	Q	5–4		3–5	5–2	5–1
3	Rolf Edling (SWE)	3	1	18	13	Q	3–5	5–3		5–4	5–3
4	Mikko Salminen (FIN)	1	3	12	15		1–5	2–5	4–5		5–0
5	Thierry Soumagne (BEL)	0	4	7	20		3–5	1–5	3–5	0–5	

Source: Official Report, vol. 3, p. 251

==== Round 1 Pool C ====
Pos	Fencer	W	L	TF	TA	Notes	IP	JH	IO	JD	HG
1	Ioan Popa (ROU)	4	0	20	10	Q		5–2	5–3	5–2	5–3
2	Johan Harmenberg (SWE)	3	1	17	11	Q	2–5		5–3	5–2	5–1
3	István Osztrics (HUN)	2	2	16	15	Q	3–5	3–5		5–3	5–2
4	Jiří Douba (TCH)	1	3	12	17		2–5	2–5	3–5		5–2
5	Heriberto González (CUB)	0	4	8	20		3–5	1–5	2–5	2–5	

Source: Official Report, vol. 3, p. 251

==== Round 1 Pool D ====
Pos	Fencer	W	L	TF	TA	Notes	JJ	EF	AMo	AMa	NM
1	Jaroslav Jurka (TCH)	4	0	20	14	Q		5–3	5.1–5	5–4	5–2
2	Efigenio Favier (CUB)	2	2	17	17	Q	3–5		4–5	5–3	5–4
3	Aleksandr Mozhayev (URS)	2	2	18	18	Q	5–5.1	5–4		3–5	5–4
4	Angelo Mazzoni (ITA)	1	3	17	18		4–5	3–5	5–3		5–5.1
5	Neal Mallett (GBR)	1	3	15	20		2–5	4–5	4–5	5.1–5	

Source: Official Report, vol. 3, p. 251

==== Round 1 Pool E ====
Pos	Fencer	W	L	TF	TA	Notes	AL	LP	SP	HH	GB
1	Andrzej Lis (POL)	4	0	20	13	Q		5–3	5–4	5–2	5–4
2	László Pető (HUN)	2	2	15	14	Q	3–5		2–5	5–2	5–2
3	Steven Paul (GBR)	2	2	17	16	Q	4–5	5–2		3–5	5–4
4	Heikki Hulkkonen (FIN)	2	2	14	15		2–5	2–5	5–3		5–2
5	Guillermo Betancourt (CUB)	0	4	12	20		4–5	2–5	4–5	2–5	

Source: Official Report, vol. 3, p. 251

==== Round 1 Pool F ====
Pos	Fencer	W	L	TF	TA	Notes	EK	SB	OK	OZ	OAK
1	Ernő Kolczonay (HUN)	3	1	19	11	Q		4–5	5.1–5	5–1	5–0
1	Stefano Bellone (ITA)	3	1	19	11	Q	5–4		4–5	5–1	5–1
3	Oldřich Kubišta (TCH)	2	2	18	17	Q	5–5.1	5–4		3–5	5–3
4	Octavian Zidaru (ROU)	2	2	12	13		1–5	1–5	5–3		5–0
5	Osama Al-Khurafi (KUW)	0	4	4	20		0–5	1–5	3–5	0–5	

Source: Official Report, vol. 3, p. 251

==== Round 1 Pool G ====
Pos	Fencer	W	L	TF	TA	Notes	PP	AP	JL	LS	MAT	DH
1	Patrick Picot (FRA)	4	1	24	15	Q		5.1–5	5–3	4–5	5–0	5–2
2	Anton Pongratz (ROU)	3	2	23	11	Q	5–5.1		3–5	5–1	5–0	5–0
3	John Llewellyn (GBR)	3	2	23	14	Q	3–5	5–3		5–5	5–0	5–1
4	Leszek Swornowski (POL)	3	2	21	17		5–4	1–5	5–5		5–2	5–1
5	Mohamed Al-Thuwani (KUW)	1	4	7	23		0–5	0–5	0–5	2–5		5–3
6	Dany Haddad (LIB)	0	5	7	25		2–5	0–5	1–5	1–5	3–5	

Source: Official Report, vol. 3, p. 251

==== Round 1 Pool H ====
Pos	Fencer	W	L	TF	TA	Notes	HJ	GB	BL	MF	KH	HH
1	Hans Jacobson (SWE)	5	0	25	11	Q		5.1–5	5–2	5–2	5–1	5–1
2	Greg Benko (AUS)	4	1	25	16	Q	5–5.1		5–4	5–1	5.1–5	5–1
3	Boris Lukomsky (URS)	3	2	21	13	Q	2–5	4–5		5–1	5–2	5–0
4	Marco Falcone (ITA)	2	3	14	21		2–5	1–5	1–5		5–2	5–4
5	Kazem Hasan (KUW)	1	4	15	21		1–5	5–5.1	2–5	2–5		5–1
6	Hassan Hamze (LIB)	0	5	7	25		1–5	1–5	0–5	4–5	1–5	

Source: Official Report, vol. 3, p. 251

=== Round 2 ===
==== Round 2 Pool A ====
Pos	Fencer	W	L	TF	TA	Notes	HJ	EK	SB	AM	AP	JL
1	Hans Jacobson (SWE)	4	1	24	15	Q		4–5	5–2	5–3	5–3	5–2
2	Ernő Kolczonay (HUN)	4	1	22	28	Q	5–4		2–5	5–3	5–4	5–2
3	Stefano Bellone (ITA)	4	1	22	20	Q	2–5	5–2		5–4	5.1–5	5–4
4	Aleksandr Mozhayev (URS)	2	3	20	21	Q	3–5	3–5	4–5		5–3	5–3
5	Anton Pongratz (ROU)	1	4	20	23		3–5	4–5	5–5.1	3–5		5–3
6	John Llewellyn (GBR)	0	5	14	25		2–5	2–5	4–5	3–5	3–5	

Source: Official Report, vol. 3, p. 252

==== Round 2 Pool B ====
Pos	Fencer	W	L	TF	TA	Notes	RE	BL	PB	IP	EF	PJ
1	Rolf Edling (SWE)	5	0	25	14	Q		5–2	5–3	5–2	5–3	5–4
2	Boris Lukomsky (URS)	4	1	22	20	Q	2–5		5.1–5	5–4	5–3	5–3
3	Philippe Boisse (FRA)	2	3	22	22	Q	3–5	5–5.1		5–4	4–5	5–3
4	Ioan Popa (ROU)	2	3	20	21	Q	2–5	4–5	4–5		5–1	5.1–5
5	Efigenio Favier (CUB)	2	3	17	22		3–5	3–5	5–4	1–5		5–3
6	Piotr Jabłkowski (POL)	0	5	18	25		4–5	3–5	3–5	5–5.1	3–5	

Source: Official Report, vol. 3, p. 252

==== Round 2 Pool C ====
Pos	Fencer	W	L	TF	TA	Notes	PR	JH	LP	AL	GB	OK
1	Philippe Riboud (FRA)	5	0	25	16	Q		5–4	5–2	5–3	5.1–5	5–2
2	Johan Harmenberg (SWE)	3	2	23	18	Q	4–5		5–4	4–5	5–0	5–4
3	László Pető (HUN)	2	3	20	20	Q	2–5	4–5		5–4	4–5	5–1
4	Andrzej Lis (POL)	2	3	21	21	Q	3–5	5–4	4–5		4–5	5–2
5	Greg Benko (AUS)	2	3	19	23		5–5.1	0–5	5–4	5–4		4–5
6	Oldřich Kubišta (TCH)	1	4	14	24		2–5	4–5	1–5	2–5	5–4	

Source: Official Report, vol. 3, p. 252

==== Round 2 Pool D ====
Pos	Fencer	W	L	TF	TA	Notes	JJ	AA	IO	SP	PP	SG
1	Jaroslav Jurka (TCH)	4	1	24	14	Q		4–5	5–1	5–2	5–4	5–2
2	Aleksandr Abushakhmetov (URS)	4	1	24	18	Q	5–4		5–2	4–5	5–4	5–3
3	István Osztrics (HUN)	3	2	18	18	Q	1–5	2–5		5–1	5–3	5–4
4	Steven Paul (GBR)	3	2	18	19	Q	2–5	5–4	1–5		5–2	5–3
5	Patrick Picot (FRA)	1	4	18	24		4–5	4–5	3–5	2–5		5–4
6	Stéphane Ganeff (BEL)	0	5	16	25		2–5	3–5	4–5	3–5	4–5	

Source: Official Report, vol. 3, p. 252

=== Double elimination rounds ===
==== Winners brackets ====
===== Winners group 1 =====
Round of 16		Round of 8
Hans Jacobson (SWE)	W
László Pető (HUN)	L	Hans Jacobson (SWE)	L
Ioan Popa (ROU)	W	Ioan Popa (ROU)	W
Boris Lukomsky (URS)	L

===== Winners group 2 =====
Round of 16		Round of 8
Ernő Kolczonay (HUN)	W
Steven Paul (GBR)	L	Ernő Kolczonay (HUN)	W
Philippe Riboud (FRA)	W	Philippe Riboud (FRA)	L
Aleksandr Mozhayev (URS)	L

===== Winners group 3 =====
Round of 16		Round of 8
Rolf Edling (SWE)	W
Philippe Boisse (FRA)	L	Rolf Edling (SWE)	W
Aleksandr Abushakhmetov (URS)	W	Aleksandr Abushakhmetov (URS)	L
Andrzej Lis (POL)	L

===== Winners group 4 =====
Round of 16		Round of 8
Johan Harmenberg (SWE)	W
Stefano Bellone (ITA)	L	Johan Harmenberg (SWE)	W
István Osztrics (HUN)	W	István Osztrics (HUN)
Jaroslav Jurka (TCH)	L

==== Losers brackets ====
===== Losers group 1 =====
Round of 4
László Pető (HUN)	L
Boris Lukomsky (URS)	W
Steven Paul (GBR)	L
Aleksandr Mozhayev (URS)	W

Round of 4
Boris Lukomsky (URS)	W
István Osztrics (HUN)
Aleksandr Mozhayev (URS)	W
Hans Jacobson (SWE)	L

Round of 2
Boris Lukomsky (URS)
Aleksandr Mozhayev (URS)	W

===== Losers group 2 =====
Round of 4
Philippe Boisse (FRA)	W
Andrzej Lis (POL)
Stefano Bellone (ITA)	L
Jaroslav Jurka (TCH)	W

Round of 4
Philippe Boisse (FRA)	L
Philippe Riboud (FRA)	W
Jaroslav Jurka (TCH)	W
Aleksandr Abushakhmetov (URS)	L

Round of 2
Philippe Riboud (FRA)	W
Jaroslav Jurka (TCH)	L

=== Final round ===
Pos	Fencer	W	L	TF	TA	JH	EK	PR	RE	AM	IP
1st place, gold medalist(s)	Johan Harmenberg (SWE)	4	1	22	21		5.1–5	5.1–5	5–2	2–5	5–4
2nd place, silver medalist(s)	Ernő Kolczonay (HUN)	3	2	23	19	5–5.1		3–5	5–1	5–3	5.1–5
3rd place, bronze medalist(s)	Philippe Riboud (FRA)	3	2	20	17	5–5.1	5–3		0–5	5–3	5–1
4	Rolf Edling (SWE)	3	2	18	16	2–5	1–5	5–0		5–3	5–3
5	Aleksandr Mozhayev (URS)	1	4	18	22	5–2	3–5	3–5	3–5		4–5
6	Ioan Popa (ROU)	1	4	18	24	4–5	5–5.1	1–5	3–5	5–4	

Source: Official Report, vol. 3, p. 253

== Final classification ==
Fencer	Nation
Johan Harmenberg	Sweden
Ernő Kolczonay	Hungary
Philippe Riboud	France
Rolf Edling	Sweden
Aleksandr Mozhayev	Soviet Union
Ioan Popa	Romania
Jaroslav Jurka	Czechoslovakia
Boris Lukomsky	Soviet Union
Hans Jacobson	Sweden
István Osztrics	Hungary
Aleksandr Abushakhmetov	Soviet Union
Philippe Boisse	France
László Pető	Hungary
Steven Paul	Great Britain
Andrzej Lis	Poland
Stefano Bellone	Italy
Greg Benko	Australia
Efigenio Favier	Cuba
Anton Pongratz	Romania
Patrick Picot	France
Oldřich Kubišta	Czechoslovakia
Piotr Jabłkowski	Poland
Stéphane Ganeff	Belgium
John Llewellyn	Great Britain
Leszek Swornowski	Poland
Octavian Zidaru	Romania
Heikki Hulkkonen	Finland
Marco Falcone	Italy
Angelo Mazzoni	Italy
Mikko Salminen	Finland
Jiří Douba	Czechoslovakia
Neal Mallett	Great Britain
José Pérez	Spain
Kazem Hasan	Kuwait
Mohamed Al-Thuwani	Kuwait
Peder Planting	Finland
Guillermo Betancourt	Cuba
Heriberto González	Cuba
Thierry Soumagne	Belgium
Osama Al-Khurafi	Kuwait
Dany Haddad	Lebanon
Hassan Hamze	Lebanon
