= Fencing at the 1980 Summer Olympics – Men's foil =

Fencing at the Olympics

Men's foil at the Games of the XXII Olympiad
- Venue: Central Army Sports Club Complex
- Dates: 22–23 July 1980
- Competitors: 37 from 16 nations

Medalists
1st place, gold medalist(s)		Vladimir Smirnov	Soviet Union
2nd place, silver medalist(s)		Pascal Jolyot	France
3rd place, bronze medalist(s)		Aleksandr Romankov	Soviet Union

The men's foil was one of eight fencing events on the fencing at the 1980 Summer Olympics programme. It was the eighteenth appearance of the event. The competition was held from 22 to 23 July 1980. 37 fencers from 16 nations competed. Nations had been limited to three fencers each since 1928. The event was won by Vladimir Smirnov of the Soviet Union, the nation's first victory in the men's foil since 1960 and second overall. His countryman Alexandr Romankov took bronze, becoming the eighth man to win multiple medals in the event. It was the first time in five Games that France did not receive the bronze medal—though Pascal Jolyot earned silver instead.

== Background ==
This was the 18th appearance of the event, which has been held at every Summer Olympics except 1908 (when there was a foil display only rather than a medal event). Three of the six finalists from 1976 returned: silver medalist Aleksandr Romankov of the Soviet Union, fifth-place finisher Frédéric Pietruszka of France, and sixth-place finisher Greg Benko of Australia. The American-led boycott had little effect on the favorites, with top foil fencing nations France, Italy, the Soviet Union, Romania, and Hungary all competing. Romankov was the favorite, having won the 1974, 1977, and 1979 world championships. France presented the strongest challengers to him, with Didier Flament, the 1978 world champion, and Pascal Jolyot, the 1979 world runner-up.

Algeria made its debut in the men's foil. France made its 16th appearance, matching the United States for most of any nation; France had missed only the 1904 (with fencers not traveling to St. Louis) and the 1912 (boycotted due to a dispute over rules) foil competitions.

== Competition format ==
The 1980 tournament continued to use a mix of pool and knockout rounds. The competition included two pool rounds, followed by a double-elimination knockout round, finishing with a final pool round. In each pool round, the fencers competed in a round-robin.

Bouts in the round-robin pools were to 5 touches; bouts in the double-elimination round were to 10 touches. Repechages were not used in the first two rounds, but were used to determine medalists if necessary in the final.

== Schedule ==
All times are Moscow Time (UTC+3)

Date	Time	Round
Tuesday, 22 July 1980		Round 1 Round 2
Wednesday, 23 July 1980		Elimination rounds Final

== Results ==
=== Round 1 ===
==== Round 1 Pool A ====
Pos	Fencer	W	L	TF	TA	Qual.	AR	VS	IS	TH	DH
1	Adam Robak (POL)	4	0	20	13	Q		5–4	5–3	5–3	5–3
2	Volodymyr Smyrnov (URS)	3	1	19	11	Q	4–5		5–3	5–2	5–1
3	István Szelei (HUN)	2	2	16	15	Q	3–5	3–5		5–3	5–2
4	Tahar Hamou (ALG)	1	3	13	17		3–5	2–5	3–5		5–2
5	Dany Haddad (LIB)	0	4	8	20		3–5	1–5	2–5	2–5	

Source: Official Report, vol. 3, p. 235

==== Round 1 Pool B ====
Pos	Fencer	W	L	TF	TA	Qual.	GB	RB	AR	JE	HH
1	Greg Benko (AUS)	3	1	18	11	Q		5–3	3–5	5–3	5–0
1	Rob Bruniges (GBR)	3	1	18	11	Q	3–5		5–3	5–3	5–0
3	Aleksandr Romankov (URS)	3	1	18	12	Q	5–3	3–5		5–3	5–1
4	Jesús Esperanza (ESP)	1	3	14	19		3–5	3–5	3–5		5–4
5	Hassan Hamze (LIB)	0	4	5	20		0–5	0–5	1–5	4–5	

Source: Official Report, vol. 3, p. 235

==== Round 1 Pool C ====
Pos	Fencer	W	L	TF	TA	Qual.	DF	KK	SG	FK	KAM
1	Didier Flament (FRA)	4	0	20	9	Q		5–3	5–3	5–3	5–0
2	Klaus Kotzmann (GDR)	3	1	18	14	Q	3–5		5–4	5–4	5–1
3	Stéphane Ganeff (BEL)	2	2	17	14	Q	3–5	4–5		5–1	5–3
4	František Koukal (TCH)	1	3	13	18		3–5	4–5	1–5		5–3
5	Kifah Al-Mutawa (KUW)	0	4	7	20		0–5	1–5	3–5	3–5	

Source: Official Report, vol. 3, p. 235

==== Round 1 Pool D ====
Pos	Fencer	W	L	TF	TA	Qual.	PJ	TS	MR	MT	KAA
1	Pascal Jolyot (FRA)	3	1	15	9	Q		0–5	5–3	5–1	5–0
2	Thierry Soumagne (BEL)	2	2	18	11	Q	5–0		4–5	4–5	5–1
3	Miguel Roca (ESP)	2	2	15	15	Q	3–5	5–4		2–5	5–1
4	Mihai Țiu (ROU)	2	2	15	16		1–5	5–4	5–2		4–5
5	Khaled Al-Awadhi (KUW)	1	3	7	19		0–5	1–5	1–5	5–4	

Source: Official Report, vol. 3, p. 235

==== Round 1 Pool E ====
Pos	Fencer	W	L	TF	TA	Qual.	PK	BZ	HB	EF	AAA
1	Petru Kuki (ROU)	4	0	20	8	Q		5–2	5–1	5–3	5–2
2	Bogusław Zych (POL)	3	1	17	13	Q	2–5		5–2	5–4	5–2
3	Hartmuth Behrens (GDR)	2	2	13	12	Q	1–5	2–5		5–2	5–0
4	Efigenio Favier (CUB)	1	3	14	15		3–5	4–5	2–5		5–0
5	Ahmed Al-Ahmed (KUW)	0	4	4	20		2–5	2–5	0–5	0–5	

Source: Official Report, vol. 3, p. 235

==== Round 1 Pool F ====
Pos	Fencer	W	L	TF	TA	Qual.	KH	LK	PH	GB
1	Klaus Haertter (GDR)	3	0	15	8	Q		5–4	5–4	5–0
2	Lech Koziejowski (POL)	2	1	14	8	Q	4–5		5–1	5–2
3	Pierre Harper (GBR)	1	2	10	13	Q	4–5	1–5		5–3
4	Guillermo Betancourt (CUB)	0	3	5	15		0–5	2–5	3–5	

Source: Official Report, vol. 3, p. 235

==== Round 1 Pool G ====
Pos	Fencer	W	L	TF	TA	Qual.	FP	SR	PH	AP
1	Frédéric Pietruszka (FRA)	3	0	15	10	Q		5–4	5–3	5–3
2	Sabirzhan Ruziyev (URS)	1	2	13	10	Q	4–5		4–5	5–0
3	Jaroslav Jurka (TCH)	1	2	11	14	Q	3–5	5–4		3–5
4	András Papp (HUN)	1	2	8	13		3–5	0–5	5–3	

Source: Official Report, vol. 3, p. 235

==== Round 1 Pool H ====
Pos	Fencer	W	L	TF	TA	Qual.	LD	FC	HG	TP
1	László Demény (HUN)	3	0	15	4	Q		5–2	5–1	5–1
2	Federico Cervi (ITA)	2	1	12	8	Q	2–5		5–3	5–0
3	Heriberto González (CUB)	1	2	9	10	Q	1–5	3–5		5–0
4	Tudor Petruș (ROU)	0	3	1	15		1–5	0–5	0–5	

Source: Official Report, vol. 3, p. 235

=== Round 2 ===
==== Round 2 Pool A ====
Pos	Fencer	W	L	TF	TA	Qual.	PK	JJ	HB	GB	RB	TS
1	Petru Kuki (ROU)	4	1	24	16	Q		5–3	4–5	5–3	5–1	5–4
2	Jaroslav Jurka (TCH)	3	2	20	17	Q	3–5		2–5	5–4	5–0	5–3
3	Hartmuth Behrens (GDR)	3	2	18	18	Q	5–4	5–2		2–5	1–5	5–2
4	Greg Benko (AUS)	2	3	19	18	Q	3–5	4–5	5–2		2–5	5–1
5	Rob Bruniges (GBR)	2	3	11	18		1–5	0–5	5–1	5–2		0–5
6	Thierry Soumagne (BEL)	1	4	15	20		4–5	3–5	2–5	1–5	5–0	

Source: Official Report, vol. 3, p. 236

==== Round 2 Pool B ====
Pos	Fencer	W	L	TF	TA	Qual.	AR	LK	FP	PH	SG	LD
1	Aleksandr Romankov (URS)	4	1	23	15	Q		3–5	5–2	5–2	5–4	5–2
2	Lech Koziejowski (POL)	4	1	22	16	Q	5–3		2–5	5–4	5–1	5–3
3	Frédéric Pietruszka (FRA)	3	2	21	18	Q	2–5	5–2		5–3	4–5	5–3
4	Pierre Harper (GBR)	2	3	19	21	Q	2–5	4–5	3–5		5–2	5–4
5	Stéphane Ganeff (BEL)	2	3	17	22		4–5	1–5	5–4	2–5		5–3
6	László Demény (HUN)	0	5	15	25		2–5	3–5	3–5	4–5	3–5	

Source: Official Report, vol. 3, p. 236

==== Round 2 Pool C ====
Pos	Fencer	W	L	TF	TA	Qual.	VS	IS	KK	BZ	HG	DF
1	Volodymyr Smyrnov (URS)	4	1	24	13	Q		5–1	4–5	5–3	5–4	5–0
2	István Szelei (HUN)	3	2	20	14	Q	1–5		5–2	5–2	4–5	5–0
3	Klaus Kotzmann (GDR)	3	2	18	21	Q	5–4	2–5		5–4	5–3	1–5
4	Bogusław Zych (POL)	2	3	19	21	Q	3–5	2–5	4–5		5–4	5–2
5	Heriberto González (CUB)	2	3	21	23		4–5	5–4	3–5	4–5		5–4
6	Didier Flament (FRA)	1	4	11	21		0–5	0–5	5–1	2–5	4–5	

Source: Official Report, vol. 3, p. 236

==== Round 2 Pool D ====
Pos	Fencer	W	L	TF	TA	Qual.	AR	SR	PJ	KH	FC	MR
1	Adam Robak (POL)	4	1	21	12	Q		5–3	5–1	1–5	5–1	5–2
2	Sabirzhan Ruziyev (URS)	3	2	22	13	Q	3–5		4–5	5–0	5–2	5–1
3	Pascal Jolyot (FRA)	3	2	19	18	Q	1–5	5–4		5–1	5–3	3–5
4	Klaus Haertter (GDR)	3	2	16	18	Q	5–1	0–5	1–5		5–3	5–4
5	Federico Cervi (ITA)	1	4	14	22		1–5	2–5	3–5	3–5		5–2
6	Miguel Roca (ESP)	1	4	14	23		2–5	1–5	5–3	4–5	2–5	

Source: Official Report, vol. 3, p. 236

=== Double elimination rounds ===
==== Winners brackets ====
===== Winners group 1 =====
Round of 16		Round of 8
Petru Kuki (ROU)	W
Pierre Harper (GBR)	L	Petru Kuki (ROU)	L
Pascal Jolyot (FRA)	W	Pascal Jolyot (FRA)	W
Klaus Kotzmann (GDR)	L

===== Winners group 2 =====
Round of 16		Round of 8
Lech Koziejowski (POL)	W
Hartmuth Behrens (GDR)	L	Lech Koziejowski (POL)	L
Aleksandr Romankov (URS)	W	Aleksandr Romankov (URS)	W
Jaroslav Jurka (TCH)	L

===== Winners group 3 =====
Round of 16		Round of 8
Volodymyr Smyrnov (URS)	W
Bogusław Zych (POL)	L	Volodymyr Smyrnov (URS)	W
István Szelei (HUN)	W	István Szelei (HUN)	L
Frédéric Pietruszka (FRA)	L

===== Winners group 4 =====
Round of 16		Round of 8
Greg Benko (AUS)	W
Klaus Haertter (GDR)	L	Greg Benko (AUS)	L
Sabirzhan Ruziyev (URS)	W	Sabirzhan Ruziyev (URS)	W
Adam Robak (POL)	L

==== Losers brackets ====
===== Losers group 1 =====
Round of 4
Hartmuth Behrens (GDR)	W
Jaroslav Jurka (TCH)	L
Klaus Haertter (GDR)	L
Adam Robak (POL)	W

Round of 4
Hartmuth Behrens (GDR)	L
Petru Kuki (ROU)	W
Adam Robak (POL)	L
István Szelei (HUN)	W

Round of 2
Petru Kuki (ROU)	W
István Szelei (HUN)	L

===== Losers group 2 =====
Round of 4
Pierre Harper (GBR)	L
Klaus Kotzmann (GDR)	W
Bogusław Zych (POL)	L
Frédéric Pietruszka (FRA)	W

Round of 4
Klaus Kotzmann (GDR)	L
Lech Koziejowski (POL)	W
Frédéric Pietruszka (FRA)	W
Greg Benko (AUS)	L

Round of 2
Lech Koziejowski (POL)	W
Frédéric Pietruszka (FRA)	L

=== Final round ===
Pos	Fencer	W	L	TF	TA	Qual.	VS	PJ	AR	SR	LK	PK
1	Volodymyr Smyrnov (URS)	4	1	24	16	B		4–5	5–2	5–4	5–2	5–3
1	Pascal Jolyot (FRA)	4	1	24	17	B	5–4		4–5	5–3	5–4	5–1
1	Aleksandr Romankov (URS)	4	1	22	15	B	2–5	5–4		5–3	5–2	5–1
4	Sabirzhan Ruziyev (URS)	2	3	20	19		4–5	3–5	3–5		5–2	5–2
5	Lech Koziejowski (POL)	1	4	15	21		2–5	4–5	2–5	2–5		5–1
6	Petru Kuki (ROU)	0	5	8	25		3–5	1–5	1–5	2–5	1–5	

Source: Official Report, vol. 3, p. 237

Barrage

Pos	Fencer	W	L	TF	TA	VS	PJ	AR
1st place, gold medalist(s)	Volodymyr Smyrnov (URS)	1	1	9	5		5–0	4–5
2nd place, silver medalist(s)	Pascal Jolyot (FRA)	1	1	5	5	0–5		5–0
3rd place, bronze medalist(s)	Aleksandr Romankov (URS)	1	1	5	9	5–4	0–5	

Source: Official Report, vol. 3, p. 237

== Final classification ==
Fencer	Country
Volodymyr Smyrnov	Soviet Union
Pascal Jolyot	France
Aleksandr Romankov	Soviet Union
Sabirzhan Ruziyev	Soviet Union
Lech Koziejowski	Poland
Petru Kuki	Romania
István Szelei	Hungary
Frédéric Pietruszka	France
Hartmuth Behrens	East Germany
Adam Robak	Poland
Greg Benko	Australia
Klaus Kotzmann	East Germany
Pierre Harper	Great Britain
Jaroslav Jurka	Czechoslovakia
Bogusław Zych	Poland
Klaus Haertter	East Germany
Heriberto González	Cuba
Stéphane Ganeff	Belgium
Rob Bruniges	Great Britain
Thierry Soumagne	Belgium
Federico Cervi	Italy
Miguel Roca	Spain
Didier Flament	France
László Demény	Hungary
Mihai Țiu	Romania
András Papp	Hungary
Efigenio Favier	Cuba
Tahar Hamou	Algeria
František Koukal	Czechoslovakia
Jesús Esperanza	Spain
Khaled Al-Awadhi	Kuwait
Guillermo Betancourt	Cuba
Dany Haddad	Lebanon
Kifah Al-Mutawa	Kuwait
Tudor Petruș	Romania
Hassan Hamze	Lebanon
Ahmed Al-Ahmed	Kuwait
