= Fencing at the 1980 Summer Olympics – Men's team épée =

Men's team épée at the Games of the XXII Olympiad
- Venue: Central Army Sports Club Complex
- Dates: 30–31 July 1980
- Competitors: 52 from 11 nations

Medalists
1st place, gold medalist(s)		Philippe Boisse; Hubert Gardas; Philippe Riboud; Patrick Picot; Michel Salesse	France
2nd place, silver medalist(s)		Andrzej Lis; Marius Strzalka; Leszek Swornowski; Ludomir Chronowski; Piotr Jabłkowski	Poland
3rd place, bronze medalist(s)		Ashot Karagyan; Aleksandr Abushakhmetov; Aleksandr Mozhayev; Boris Lukomsky; Volodymyr Smyrnov	Soviet Union

The men's team épée was one of eight fencing events on the fencing at the 1980 Summer Olympics programme. It was the sixteenth appearance of the event. The competition was held from 30 to 31 July 1980. 52 fencers from 11 nations competed.

== Rosters ==
Cuba

- Efigenio Favier
- Guillermo Betancourt
- Heriberto González
- Pedro Hernández

Czechoslovakia

- Jaroslav Jurka
- Jaromír Holub
- Jiří Douba
- Jiří Adam
- Oldřich Kubišta

Finland

- Heikki Hulkkonen
- Kimmo Puranen
- Peter Grönholm
- Peder Planting
- Mikko Salminen

France

- Philippe Boisse
- Hubert Gardas
- Philippe Riboud
- Patrick Picot
- Michel Salesse

Great Britain

- Steven Paul
- John Llewellyn
- Neal Mallett
- Rob Bruniges

Hungary

- Ernő Kolczonay
- István Osztrics
- László Pető
- Jenő Pap
- Péter Takács

Kuwait

- Ebrahim Al-Cattan
- Osama Al-Khurafi
- Mohamed Al-Thuwani
- Kazem Hasan
- Kifah Al-Mutawa

Poland

- Andrzej Lis
- Marius Strzalka
- Leszek Swornowski
- Ludomir Chronowski
- Piotr Jabłkowski

Romania

- Ioan Popa
- Octavian Zidaru
- Anton Pongratz
- Costică Bărăgan

Soviet Union

- Ashot Karagyan
- Aleksandr Abushakhmetov
- Aleksandr Mozhayev
- Boris Lukomsky
- Volodymyr Smyrnov

Sweden

- Johan Harmenberg
- Rolf Edling
- Leif Högström
- Göran Malkar
- Hans Jacobson

== Results ==
=== Round 1 ===
==== Round 1 Pool A ====
In the only match in pool A, Sweden defeated Great Britain 8–3 (with one double-loss).

Pos	Team	W	L	BW	BL	Qual.	SWE	GBR
1	Sweden	1	0	8	4	Q		8–3
2	Great Britain	0	1	3	9	Q	3–8	

Source: Official Report, vol. 3, p. 255

==== Round 1 Pool B ====
Poland and the Soviet Union each defeated Cuba, 12–4 and 15–1, respectively. The two victors then faced off. The Soviet Union won 7–5, with 2 double losses and a 64–49 touches advantage making the final two bouts unnecessary.

Pos	Team	W	L	BW	BL	Qual.	URS	POL	CUB
1	Soviet Union	2	0	22	8	Q		7–5	15–1
2	Poland	1	1	17	13	Q	5–7		12–4
3	Cuba	0	2	5	27		1–15	4–12	

Source: Official Report, vol. 3, p. 255

==== Round 1 Pool C ====
Czechoslovakia and Hungary each defeated Finland, 13–3 and 8–8 (67 touches to 53), respectively. The two victors then faced off. Hungary won 9–1.

Pos	Team	W	L	BW	BL	Qual.	HUN	TCH	FIN
1	Hungary	2	0	17	9	Q		9–1	8.67–8.53
2	Czechoslovakia	1	1	14	12	Q	1–9		13–3
3	Finland	0	2	11	21		8.53–8.67	3–13	

Source: Official Report, vol. 3, pp. 255–56

==== Round 1 Pool D ====
Romania and France each defeated Kuwait, 12–4 and 16–0 respectively. The winners then faced off, with France winning 9–6.

Pos	Team	W	L	BW	BL	Qual.	FRA	ROU	KUW
1	France	2	0	25	6	Q		9–6	16–0
2	Romania	1	1	18	13	Q	6–9		12–4
3	Kuwait	0	2	4	28		0–16	4–12	

Source: Official Report, vol. 3, pp. 256–57

=== Elimination rounds ===
==== Main bracket ====
Quarterfinals
A1	Sweden	6
B2	Poland	8
C1	Hungary	5
D2	Romania	8
C2	Czechoslovakia	3
D1	France	9
A2	Great Britain	2
B1	Soviet Union	9

Semifinals
B2	Poland	8
D2	Romania	4
C1	France	9
A1	Soviet Union	3

Finals
B2	Poland	4
A1	France	8
Third place
D2	Romania	5
C1	Soviet Union	9

==== Consolation bracket ====
Semifinals
A1	Sweden	9
C1	Hungary	4
C2	Czechoslovakia	9
A2	Great Britain	4

Fifth place
A1	Sweden	9
C2	Czechoslovakia	2
Seventh place
C1	Hungary	DNS
A2	Great Britain	WO
