= Fencing at the 1980 Summer Olympics – Men's team foil =

Men's team foil at the Games of the XXII Olympiad
- Venue: Central Army Sports Club Complex
- Dates: 25–26 July 1980
- Competitors: 40 from 9 nations

Medalists
1st place, gold medalist(s)		Frédéric Pietruszka; Didier Flament; Pascal Jolyot; Philippe Bonnin; Bruno Boscherie	France
2nd place, silver medalist(s)		Aleksandr Romankov; Volodymyr Smyrnov; Sabirzhan Ruziyev; Ashot Karagyan; Vladimir Lapitsky	Soviet Union
3rd place, bronze medalist(s)		Adam Robak; Bogusław Zych; Lech Koziejowski; Marian Sypniewski	Poland

The men's team foil was one of eight fencing events on the fencing at the 1980 Summer Olympics programme. It was the fifteenth appearance of the event. The competition was held from 25 to 26 July 1980. 40 fencers from 9 nations competed.

== Rosters ==
Cuba
- Efigenio Favier
- Guillermo Betancourt
- Heriberto González
- Pedro Hernández

East Germany
- Siegmar Gutzeit
- Hartmuth Behrens
- Adrian Germanus
- Klaus Kotzmann
- Klaus Haertter

France
- Frédéric Pietruszka
- Didier Flament
- Pascal Jolyot
- Philippe Bonnin
- Bruno Boscherie

Great Britain
- John Llewellyn
- Steven Paul
- Rob Bruniges
- Pierre Harper

Hungary
- István Szelei
- Ernő Kolczonay
- András Papp
- László Demény
- Jenő Pap

Kuwait
- Ahmed Al-Ahmed
- Khaled Al-Awadhi
- Ali Al-Khawajah
- Kifah Al-Mutawa

Poland
- Adam Robak
- Bogusław Zych
- Lech Koziejowski
- Marian Sypniewski

Romania
- Petru Kuki
- Mihai Țiu
- Sorin Roca
- Tudor Petruș

Soviet Union
- Aleksandr Romankov
- Volodymyr Smyrnov
- Sabirzhan Ruziyev
- Ashot Karagyan
- Vladimir Lapitsky

== Results ==
=== Round 1 ===
==== Round 1 Pool A ====
Romania and the Soviet Union each defeated Great Britain, 12–4 and 13–3, respectively. The two victors then faced off. The Soviet Union won 9–2.

Pos	Team	W	L	BW	BL	Qual.	URS	ROU	GBR
1	Soviet Union	2	0	22	5	QS		9–2	13–3
2	Romania	1	1	14	13	QQ	2–9		12–4
3	Great Britain	0	2	7	25		3–13	4–12	

Source: Official Report, vol. 3, p. 239

==== Round 1 Pool B ====
Cuba and Hungary tied at 8–8, with 58 touches apiece. France then defeated both of the other teams, 10–6 each.

Pos	Team	W	L	BW	BL	Qual.	FRA	HUN	CUB
1	France	2	0	20	12	QS		10–6	10–6
2	Hungary	0.5	1.5	14	18	QQ	6–10		8–8
3	Cuba	0.5	1.5	14	18		6–10	8–8	

Source: Official Report, vol. 3, pp. 239–40

==== Round 1 Pool C ====
East Germany and Poland each defeated Kuwait, 14–2 and 15–1, respectively. The two victors then faced off. Poland won 9–5.

Pos	Team	W	L	BW	BL	Qual.	POL	GDR	KUW
1	Poland	2	0	24	6	QQ		9–5	15–1
2	East Germany	1	1	19	11	QQ	5–9		14–2
3	Kuwait	0	2	3	29		1–15	2–14	

Source: Official Report, vol. 3, p. 240

=== Elimination rounds ===
Quarterfinals
A2	Romania	5
C2	East Germany	8
B1	France
Bye
B2	Hungary	7
C1	Poland	9
A1	Soviet Union
Bye

Semifinals
C2	East Germany	7
B1	France	9
C1	Poland	7
A1	Soviet Union	9

Final
B1	France	8 (68)
A1	Soviet Union	8 (60)
Third place
C2	East Germany	5
C1	Poland	9

Fifth Place
A2	Romania	9
B2	Hungary	7
