= France at the 1980 Summer Olympics =

- IOC code: FRA
- NOC: French National Olympic and Sports Committee

in Moscow
- Competitors: 121 (98 men and 23 women) in 13 sports
- Medals Ranked 8th: Gold 6 Silver 5 Bronze 3 Total 14

Summer Olympics appearances (overview)
- 1896; 1900; ~~1904~~; 1908; 1912; 1920; 1924; 1928; 1932; 1936; 1948; 1952; 1956; 1960; 1964; 1968; 1972; 1976; 1980; 1984; 1988; 1992; 1996; 2000; 2004; 2008; 2012; 2016; 2020; 2024; 2028

Other related appearances
- 1906 Intercalated Games

France competed at the 1980 Summer Olympics in Moscow, USSR. In partial support of the American-led boycott of the 1980 Summer Olympics, France competed under the Olympic Flag instead of its national flag. 121 competitors, 98 men and 23 women, took part in 85 events in 13 sports.

== Medalists ==
=== Gold ===
- Thierry Rey — Judo, Men's Extra Lightweight (60 kg)
- Angelo Parisi — Judo, Men's Heavyweight
- Pascale Hachin-Trinquet — Fencing, Women's Foil Individual
- Philippe Bonnin, Bruno Boscherie, Didier Flament, Pascal Jolyot and Frédéric Pietruszka — Fencing, Men's Foil Team Competition
- Philippe Boisse, Philippe Riboud, Patrick Picot, Hubert Gardas and Michel Salesse — Fencing, Men's Épée Team Competition
- Isabelle Bégard, Véronique Brouquier, Pascale Hachin-Trinquet, Brigitte Gaudin-Latrille and Christine Muzio — Fencing, Women's Foil Team Competition

=== Silver ===
- Alain Lebas — Canoeing, Men's K1 1.000 metres Kayak Singles
- Yavé Cahard — Cycling, Men's 1.000 metres Sprint (Scratch)
- Alain Bondue — Cycling, Men's 4.000 metres Individual Pursuit
- Pascal Jolyot — Fencing, Men's Foil Individual
- Angelo Parisi — Judo, Men's Open Class

=== Bronze ===
- Bernard Tchoullouyan — Judo, Men's Half Middleweight (78 kg)
- Philippe Riboud — Fencing, Men's Épée Individual
- Antoine Richard, Hermann Panzo, Patrick Barré and Pascal Barré — Athletics, Men's 4×100 metres Relay

== Athletics ==
Men's 100 metres

- Hermann Panzo
  - Heat — 10.53
  - Quarterfinals — 10.29
  - Semifinals — 10.45
  - Final — 10.49 (→ 8th place)
- Antoine Richard
  - Heat — 10.51
  - Quarterfinals — 10.45 (→ did not advance)

Men's 200 metres

- Pascal Barré
  - Heat — did not start (→ did not advance)

Men's 800 metres

- José Marajo
  - Heat — 1:49.6
  - Semifinals — 1:47.3
  - Final — 1:47.3 (→ 7th place)
- Roger Milhau
  - Heat — 1:48.5
  - Semifinals — 1:48.1 (→ did not advance)
- Philippe Dupont
  - Heat — 1:49.6
  - Semifinals — 1:49.7 (→ did not advance)

Men's 1,500 metres

- José Marajo
  - Heat — 3:43.9
  - Semifinals — 3:39.6
  - Final — 3:41.5 (→ 7th place)
- Alex Gonzalez
  - Heat — 3:44.6
  - Semifinals — 3:44.7 (→ did not advance)

Men's Marathon

- Jean-Michel Charbonnel
  - Final — did not finish (→ no ranking)

Men's 4×400 metres Relay

- Jacques Fellice, Robert Froissart, Didier Dubois, and Francis Demarthon
  - Heat — 3:05.4
  - Final — 3:04.8 (→ 4th place)

Men's 50 km Walk

- Gérard Lelièvre
  - Final — did not finish (→ no ranking)

Men's High Jump

- Francis Agbo
  - Qualification — 2.18 m (→ did not advance)

Men's Long Jump

- Philippe Deroche
  - Qualification — 7.90 m
  - Final — 7.77 m (→ 10th place)

Men's Triple Jump

- Christian Valetudie
  - Qualification — 16.43 m
  - Final — no mark (→ no ranking)

Men's Pole Vault

- Philippe Houvion
  - Qualification — 5.35 m
  - Final — 5.65 m (→ 4th place)
- Jean-Michel Bellot
  - Qualification — 5.40 m
  - Final — 5.60 m (→ 5th place)
- Thierry Vigneron
  - Qualification — 5.40 m
  - Final — 5.45 m (→ 7th place)

Women's 100 metres

- Chantal Réga
  - Heat — 11.53
  - Quarterfinals — 11.40
  - Semifinals — 11.36
  - Final — 11.32 (→ 7th place)
- Emma Sulter
  - Heat — 11.56
  - Quarterfinals — 11.48
  - Semifinals — 11.63 (→ did not advance)
- Laureen Beckles
  - Heat — 11.59
  - Quarterfinals — 11.54
  - Semifinals — 11.70 (→ did not advance)

Women's 100 m Hurdles

- Laurence Elloy
  - Heat — 13.60
  - Semifinal — 13.33 (→ did not advance)
- Laurence Le Beau
  - Heat — 13.18
  - Semifinal — 13.54 (→ did not advance)

Women's Pentathlon

- Florence Picaut — 4424 points (→ 9th place)
  1. 100 metres — 13.75s
  2. Shot Put — 13.24m
  3. High Jump — 1.80m
  4. Long Jump — 5.83m
  5. 800 metres — 2:16.70

== Boxing ==
Men's Bantamweight (– 54 kg)

- Ali Ben Maghenia
  - First Round — Bye
  - Second Round — Defeated Pushkardhoj Shahi (Nepal) walk-over
  - Third Round — Lost to John Siryakibbe (Uganda) on points (0-5)

Men's Featherweight (– 57 kg)

- Daniel Londas
  - First Round — Bye
  - Second Round — Lost to Viktor Rybakov (Soviet Union) on points (0-5)

== Cycling ==
Nine cyclists represented France in 1980. Alain Bondue won a silver medal in the individual pursuit.

Individual road race

- Christian Faure
- Marc Madiot
- Francis Castaing
- Régis Clère

Sprint

- Yavé Cahard

1000m time trial

- Yavé Cahard

Individual pursuit

- Alain Bondue

Team pursuit

- Alain Bondue
- Philippe Chevalier
- Pascal Poisson
- Jean-Marc Rebière

== Fencing ==
16 fencers, 11 men and 5 women, represented France in 1980.

Men's foil

- Pascal Jolyot
- Frédéric Pietruszka
- Didier Flament

Men's team foil

- Frédéric Pietruszka, Didier Flament, Pascal Jolyot, Philippe Bonin, Bruno Boscherie

Men's épée

- Philippe Riboud
- Philippe Boisse
- Patrick Picot

Men's team épée

- Philippe Boisse, Hubert Gardas, Philippe Riboud, Patrick Picot, Michel Salesse

Men's sabre

- Jean-François Lamour

Women's foil

- Pascale Trinquet-Hachin
- Brigitte Latrille-Gaudin
- Véronique Brouquier

Women's team foil

- Pascale Trinquet-Hachin, Brigitte Latrille-Gaudin, Christine Muzio, Isabelle Boéri-Bégard, Véronique Brouquier

== Modern pentathlon ==
Three male pentathletes represented France in 1980.

Men's Individual Competition:

- Paul Four — 5.196 pts (→ 12th place)
- Joël Bouzou — 5.107 pts (→ 20th place)
- Alain Cortes — 5.042 pts (→ 23rd place)

Men's Team Competition:

- Four, Bouzou, and Cortes — 15.345 pts (→ 5th place)

== Swimming ==
Men's 100m Freestyle

- René Ecuyer
  - Heats — 52,09
  - Semi-Finals — 51,62
  - Final — 52,01 (→ 7th place)

Men's 200m Freestyle

- Mark Lazzaro
  - Heats — DNS
- Paskal Laget
  - Heats — 1.56,01 (→ did not advance)
- Fabien Noël
  - Heats — 1.53,25 (→ did not advance)

Men's 100m Butterfly

- Xavier Savin
  - Final — 55,66 (→ 7th place)

Men's 4 × 200 m Freestyle Relay

- Fabien Noël, Mark Lazzaro, Dominique Petit, and Paskal Laget
  - Final — 7.36,08 (→ 8th place)

Men's 4 × 100 m Medley Relay

- Frédéric Delcourt, Olivier Borios, Xavier Savin, and René Ecuyer
  - Final — 3.49,19 (→ 5th place)

Women's 100m Freestyle

- Guylaine Berger
  - Final — 57,88 (→ 7th place)

Women's 100m Breaststroke

- Catherine Poirot
  - Heats — 1:12.94 (→ did not advance)
