= Bruno Boscherie =

French fencer (born 1951)

Personal information
- Born: 22 February 1951 (age 75)

Sport
- Sport: Fencing
Medal record
Men's fencing
Representing France
Olympic Games
Gold medal – first place	1980 Moscow	Foil, team
Mediterranean Games
Bronze medal – third place	1979 Split	Individual foil

Bruno Boscherie (born 22 February 1951 in Carpentras) is a French fencer who took part in the 1980 Olympic Games in Moscow.

Boscherie was trained by Ernest Revenu in Melun, along with teammates Daniel Revenu, Bernard Talvard, Hugues Leseur, Daniel Provost, Jacky Courtillat and Frédéric Pietruszka.

He competed at the 1979 Mediterranean Games where he won a bronze medal in the individual foil event.

Boscherie became the Olympic fencing champion at the 1980 Summer Olympics in Moscow. He was part of the French team, winning team gold in the foil ahead of the Soviet Union and Poland. The others on the team were Pascal Jolyot, Philippe Bonin, Didier Flament and Frédéric Pietruszka.

== Olympic medals ==
- (gold) 1980 (Soviet Union) Moscow - Gold in fencing, team foil France
