= Vladimir Lapitsky =

Soviet fencer (born 1959)

Personal information
- Born: 18 February 1959 (age 67) Grodno, Byelorussian SSR, Soviet Union

Sport
- Sport: Fencing
Medal record
Men's fencing
Representing Soviet Union
Olympic Games
Silver medal – second place	1980 Moscow	Foil, team

Vladimir Lapitsky (born 18 February 1959) is a Soviet fencer. He won a silver medal in the team foil event at the 1980 Summer Olympics.

== Career ==
Mikhail Zolotaryov is one of Vladimir Lapitsky's coaches. He was the world champion in the team foil event in 1979.

At the Moscow Olympics, he won a silver medal in the team foil event along with Vladimir Smirnov, Alexander Romankov, Sabirjan Ruziyev, and Ashot Karagyan.

During a bout with the Polish fencer Boguslaw Zych, Lapitsky was injured. His opponent's foil broke and penetrated the soft tissue of Vladimir's back. The blade slid along his rib and exited his chest three millimeters from his heart, without hitting any vital organs.

In a 2017 interview, Alexander Romankov stated that Vladimir Lapitsky was killed in Rostov.
