= Mozhaev =

Mozhaev or Mozhayev (Russian: Можаев) is a Russian masculine surname, its feminine counterpart is Mozhaeva or Mozhayeva. It may refer to

- Aleksandr Mozhayev (born 1958), Russian fencer
- Alexei Mozhaev (1918–1994), Russian painter, graphic artist and art teacher
- Boris Mozhayev (1923–1996), Russian author, dramatist, script-writer and editor
- Sergey Mozhaev (born 1988), Russian freestyle skier
