= Sollee =

Sollee is a surname. Notable people with the surname include:

- Ben Sollee, American musician
- Eric Sollee (1926–2008), American fencer and fencing coach
