= Octavian Zidaru =

Romanian fencer (born 1953)

Octavian Zidaru MH
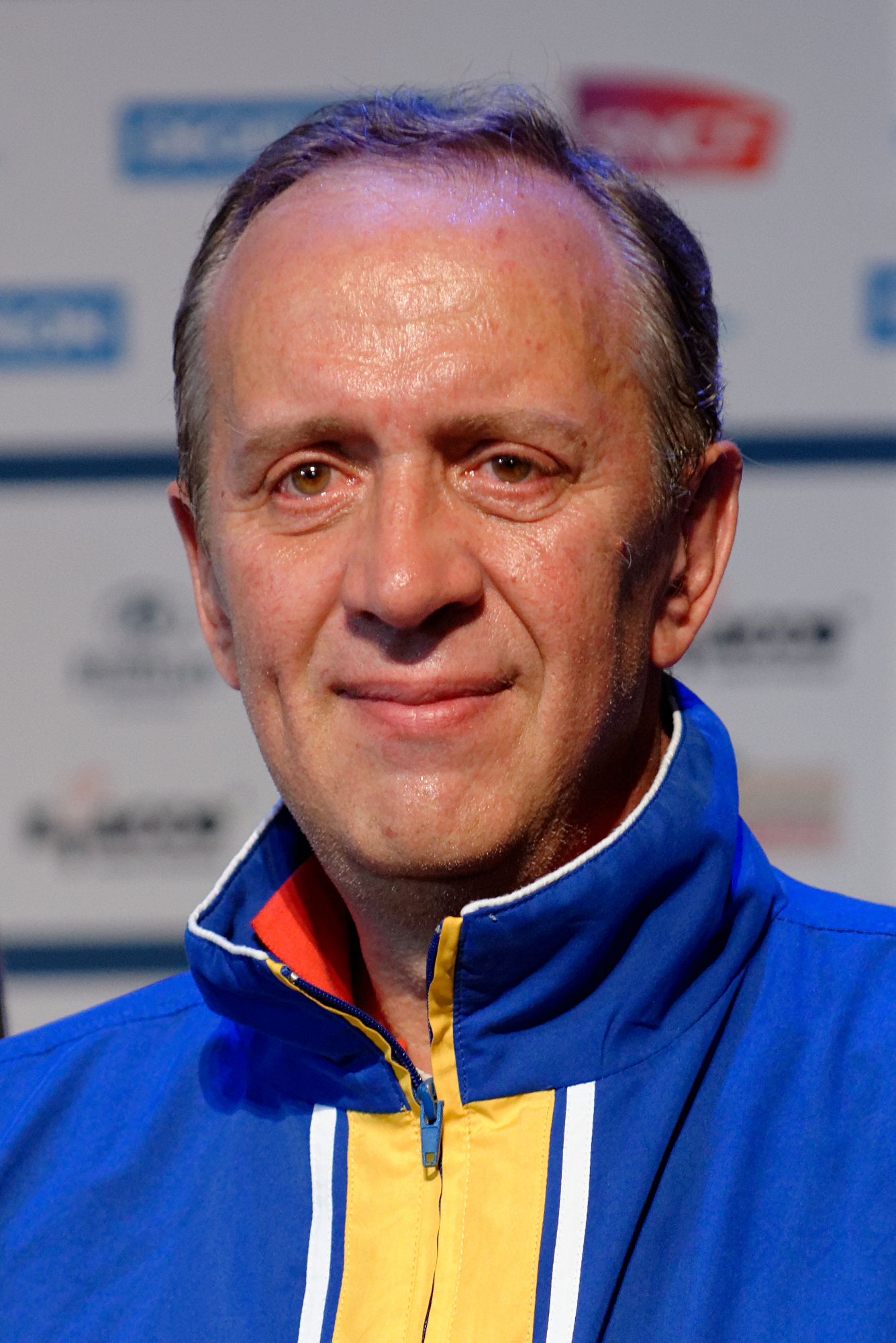
- Zidaru at the 2014 European Fencing Championships

Personal information
- Full name: Octavian Petru Zidaru
- Born: 17 October 1953 (age 72) Bucharest, Romania
- Height: 1.91 m (6 ft 3 in)
- Weight: 80 kg (180 lb; 13 st)

Fencing career
- Sport: Fencing
- Country: Romania
- Weapon: Épée
- Hand: right-handed
- Club: CSA Steaua București

Octavian Zidaru (born 17 October 1953) is a Romanian fencer and coach.

== Personal life ==
Zidaru took up fencing in 1967 at his school sports club, CSS Triumf, and later joined CSA Steaua București. He first studied economics at the Bucharest Academy of Economic Studies. He holds a Ph.D in sports science from the Faculty of Physical Education and Sports of the University of Bucharest.

== Career ==
As a sportsman, he became national champion of Romania in 1975, and was vice-champion in 1978, 1980, and 1982. He also won eleven gold medal in the team championship for Steaua and the Cupa României in 1982. He competed in the 1980 Summer Olympics in Moscow. He ranked only 26th in the individual épée event, but reached the semi-finals in the team event for Romania with Ioan Popa, Anton Pongratz, Costică Bărăgan, and Petru Kuki. The team was eventually defeated by Russia and missed the podium. He was awarded in 1977 the title of master in sports (Maestru al Sportului) and in 1982 the title of master emeritus in sports (Maestru Emerit al Sportului).

After his retirement as a fencer he became a coach at CSA Steaua and trained amongst others Cornel Milan and the 1986 world silver medal Miklós Bodoczi. He is now an international coach for the International Fencing Federation, member of the executive committee of the European Fencing Confederation and technical director of the Romanian Fencing Federation. He takes an active part in the development of fencing worldwide, giving training courses in Jordan in 2004 and 2008, and supervising the Dakar international School for fencing masters from 2005 to 2008. He also held in 2012 the first fencing coaching course specifically dedicated to women.

After Dan Podeanu's resignation following the London 2012 Summer Olympics, he became the coach of a largely reshuffled Romanian women's épée team: Loredana Dinu, Anca Măroiu and Simona Gherman retired from sport; only captain Ana Maria Brânză remained from the twice-world champion team. Zidaru drafted Simona Pop and Maria Udrea as regular team members, with Raluca Sbîrcia and Amalia Tătăran as reserves. He led them to a silver medal in the 2013 European Fencing Championships in Zagreb and a bronze medal in the 2013 World Fencing Championships in Budapest. In August 2013 he won the Romanian veteran championship in the over 60 category.

The 2013–14 season saw Simona Gherman's return to competition. She was drafted back into the team immediately and won a bronze medal at the European Championships in Strasbourg, Romania earning a sixth European title in the team event. The World Championships proved however very disappointing as no Romanian fencer got past the round of 16 and Romania lost in the quarter-finals, finishing 5th in the team event.

As of 2016, Zidaru is head coach to the Hong Kong women's épée team. Under his guidance, Vivian Kong qualified to the 2016 Summer Olympics. and they made history for Hong Kong when Vivian Kong was ranked number one in the world in the FIE 2018-2019 ranking senior women's épée. On 27 July 2024, Vivian Kong won the Olympic championship for women's épée under Zidaru's coaching.
