= Marina Soboleva =

Soviet fencer

Personal information
- Born: 27 January 1961 (age 65) Moscow, Russian SFSR, Soviet Union

Sport
- Sport: Fencing
Medal record
Representing Soviet Union
World Championships
Gold medal – first place	1981 Clermont-Ferrand	Team foil
Gold medal – first place	1986 Sofia	Team foil
Bronze medal – third place	1985 Barcelona	Team foil
Summer Universiade
Silver medal – second place	1981 Bucharest	Team foil
Silver medal – second place	1985 Kobe	Team foil
Bronze medal – third place	1985 Kobe	Individual foil

Marina Soboleva (born 27 January 1961) is a Soviet fencer. She competed in the women's team foil event at the 1988 Summer Olympics.
