= Marco Falcone =

Marco Falcone may refer to:

- Marco Falcone (fencer)
- Marco Falcone (politician)
