= Federico Cervi =

Italian fencer (born 1961)

Personal information
- Born: 9 July 1961 (age 64) Brescia, Italy

Sport
- Sport: Fencing
Medal record
Representing Italy
World Championships
Gold medal – first place	1985 Barcelona	Team foil
Gold medal – first place	1986 Sofia	Team foil
Gold medal – first place	1990 Lyon	Team foil
Silver medal – second place	1979 Melbourne	Team foil
Bronze medal – third place	1982 Rome	Individual foil
Bronze medal – third place	1982 Rome	Team foil
Bronze medal – third place	1987 Lausanne	Individual foil
Summer Universiade
Gold medal – first place	1981 Bucharest	Team foil
Gold medal – first place	1983 Edmonton	Team foil
Bronze medal – third place	1981 Bucharest	Individual foil
Bronze medal – third place	1985 Kobe	Team foil
Bronze medal – third place	1987 Zagreb	Team foil
Bronze medal – third place	1989 Duisburg	Team foil

Federico Cervi (born 9 July 1961) is an Italian fencer. He competed at the 1980 and 1988 Summer Olympics.
