= Festival Hall =

Festival Hall may refer to:

- Brisbane Festival Hall, an indoor arena, located in Brisbane, Queensland, Australia
- Festival Hall (Melbourne), a multi-use hall in Melbourne, Victoria, Australia
- Festival Hall, Osaka, a concert hall, in Kita-ku, Osaka, Japan. The Hall seats 2,709 patrons and is home to the Osaka Philharmonic Orchestra
- Royal Festival Hall, London
- Festival Hall at the 1904 St. Louis World's Fair
- A horse, the 1998 winner of the Beresford Stakes
