= Eric Sollee =

American fencer

Personal information
- Born: Eric Tennyson Sollee; September 8, 1926 Los Angeles, United States
- Died: June 30, 2008 (aged 81) Dover, New Hampshire
- Occupation: Fencing Coach

Sport
- Sport: Fencing

Eric Tennyson Sollee (September 8, 1926 – June 30, 2008) was an American fencer and fencing coach. He fenced at Harvard University, where he earned National Collegiate Athletic Association (NCAA) All-America honors. He coached at the Massachusetts Institute of Technology (MIT), Harvard, and the Carroll Center for the Blind, among others. As a coach, he is notable for finding ways to quickly develop competitive fencers and for introducing a paradigm shift in how to fence against classical fencers. Sollee trained a number of top competitors, including Olympians.

== Personal ==
=== Youth ===
Eric Sollee was born in Los Angeles, California, to a Norwegian immigrant father, Oben Sollee, and Filipino mother, Delores Sollee (née Lichauco). During the Great Depression the family moved to the Philippines for work. Sollee was listed on his father's US passport while his sister was listed on his mother's Filipino passport. At age 14 he and his father were in the Santo Tomas Internment Camp in Manila, Philippines, a Japanese prisoner camp, for 3 years during World War II. After the war, Sollee joined the US Army and was in the 42nd Construction Engineer Battalion.

=== Fencing at Harvard ===
After the Army, Sollee went to Harvard University. At Harvard, he picked up fencing quickly and was made captain of the freshman team, even without prior fencing experience. He learned to fence from René Peroy, Harvard fencing coach, European sabre champion, and member of the 1924 US Olympic fencing team. His other coach, Joseph Levis, was the second ranked in the world in foil and silver medalist at the 1932 Olympics. Sollee captained the Harvard team in 1951-52 and earned a varsity letter in 1952. With his support, Harvard's fencing team went 6-1 overall and finished 14th at the NCAA Championships in 1952. Sollee placed fifth in the foil at the NCAA Championships, earning All-America honors. In one Amateur Fencers League of America tournament, he won all three divisions - foil, épée, and sabre. He also won the Greater Boston Open Foils Championship. He was inducted into the Harvard Athletic Hall of Fame in 1999.

== Professional ==
=== Coaching at MIT ===
At MIT, Sollee started as the assistant fencing coach and the women's team first fencing coach under the direction of Edwin Richards, Edo Marion, Silvio Vitale, and Branimir Zivkovic. Sollee initiated and developed the MIT women's fencing program. When Vitale retired, Sollee became head coach and Maitre d'armes at MIT.

Because MIT doesn't recruit or offer scholarships in fencing, Sollee was charged with teaching students who typically had little to no experience fencing.

In developing his approaches to teaching and fencing, Sollee used his understanding of a wide range of subjects. His martial arts background included boxing, escrima, kali, judo, and Japanese martial arts. He also applied psychology and his experience teaching fencing to the blind at the Carroll Center. Sollee taught well over a thousand students at the Carroll Center helping people regain their orientation in space. As part of the effort to work on teaching approaches, Sollee and Johan Harmenberg came up with a new way to think about épée fencing starting with the three "Sollee conjectures". Sollee and his students collaboratively worked on these conjectures and the associated new paradigm. Harmenberg implemented these ideas and won both the World Fencing Championships and the Olympic gold medal in épée at the 1980 Summer Olympics. It also worked for those who learned and helped to further develop Sollee's ideas by working with Johan Harmenberg away from MIT, e.g. Björne Väggö, who won the Silver medal in épée in the 1984 Olympics. Sollee’s MIT men’s team won fourteen straight New England championships and won the Intercollegiate Fencing Association (IFA) first place foil team (Little Iron Man) Trophy four times in eight years. In 1980, the team tied for 2nd at the NCAAs (ended up third on indicators), resulting in Eric’s peers naming him NCAA Coach of the Year.

=== Notable students ===
==== At MIT ====
- Holt Farley ― Winner of first US circuit cup 1981, member of US National Fencing Team, finalist in several épée Fencing World Cup events, member of 4th place 1986 World Championship épée team.
- Johan Harmenberg ― Foil: IFA first place team (Little Iron Man) and individual, NCAA 3rd place individual, All-America. Épée: individual Fencing World Cup three 1st places and one 3rd place; one World Fencing Championships team 1st place; World Fencing Championships individual 1st place 1977; two Combined Fencing World Cup individual 1st places; Olympics individual épée gold medalist 1980.
- Geoff Pingree ― IFA Champion in épée (team and individual), NCAA All-America. (Had only taken a YMCA class in fencing prior to MIT).
- George Gonzalez-Rivas ― US National Sabre Team: one gold, four silver; US World Championship Team; and three time member of US World University Games Team. NCAA 3rd, All-America. (Started fencing his second year at MIT).
- Mark Smith ― Multiple gold, silver, and bronze medals at US National Foil Championships; member US Olympic Team 1980 and 1984; Member of two US World Championship teams and three US World University games teams; IFA Champion in Foil (team and individual), NCAA All-America, recipient of Georges L. Cointe Award.

==== Other notable students ====
- Caitlin Bilodeaux ― Olympic fencer
- Mary O'Neill ― Olympic fencer
- Peter Cox, Jr. ― Olympic fencer

=== The Sollee Conjectures ===
During Sollee's time at MIT, he and his students developed The Sollee Conjectures, which are now widely used as the basis for modern épée teaching.

The three conjectures are:

1. Is it possible for the fencer with the lower technical ability to decide the technical level of a bout?
2. Can the fencer with the shorter fencing distance control the distance in a bout?
3. Is it possible to force your opponent into your own area of greatest strength?

== Bibliography ==
- Harmenberg, Johan (2007). Epee 2.0: the Birth of the New Fencing Paradigm (1st ed.). SKA SwordPlay Books. ISBN 978-0-9789022-1-6.
