= Romanian Fencing Federation =

Governing body of fencing in Romania

- Sport: Fencing
- Jurisdiction: Romania
- Abbreviation: FRS
- Founded: 1931
- Affiliation: FIE
- Regional affiliation: CEE
- Headquarters: Bucharest, Str. Aviatior Popa Marin 2, sector 1
- President: Marius Florea

Official website
- www.frscrima.ro
- (Romania)

The Romanian Fencing Federation (Romanian: Federația Română de Scrimă) is the governing body for the sport of fencing in Romania. Affiliated to the International Fencing Federation since 1914, it is a member of the European Fencing Confederation and of the Romanian Olympic and Sports Committee.

According to the National Institute of Statistics, the federation had 1238 fencers in 2011. Its budget, granted by the Ministry of Youth and Sport, grew from 2.5 million lei in 2012 to 3 million lei in 2014. As of 2014, 45 clubs are affiliated to the federation. One third of them are situated in Bucharest; the most important are CS Dinamo, financed by the Ministry of Internal Affairs, and CSA Steaua, run by the Ministry of National Defense. The other clubs are based in Iași, Brașov, Satu Mare, Oradea, and Craiova.

The federation runs the Romanian Cup (Romanian: Cupa României) and the Romanian national fencing championships.

== History ==
The first governing body of fencing in Romania was the Federation of Fencing and Gymnastics Societies (Romanian: Federațiunea societăților de arme și gimnastică din România), created in 1906, then in 1912 the Federation of Sport Societies (Romanian: Federația societăților sportive din România), of which fencing was a committee. The FRS proper was founded in 1931 as a temporary organisation and officially recognised by the Union of Sports Federations of Romania (UFSR) in 1932.

== Governance ==
The FRS is governed by an executive committee, with Olympic champion and national coach for men's sabre Mihai Covaliu as president, Mihai Dincă and Colonel George Boroi (president of CSA Steaua) as vicepresidents, and international referee Marius Florea as general secretary. Octavian Zidaru, national coach for women's épée, serves as technical director.
