= Fencing at the 1981 Summer Universiade =

The Fencing competition in the 1981 Summer Universiade were held in Bucharest, Romania.

== Medal overview ==
=== Men's events ===
Event	Gold	Silver	Bronze
Individual Foil	Vladimir Smirnov (URS)	Petru Kuki (ROM)	Federico Cervi (ITA)
Team Foil	Italy (ITA)	Soviet Union (URS)	Cuba (CUB)
Individual Épée	Björne Väggö (SWE)	Olivier Lenglet (FRA)	Ernő Kolczonay (HUN)
Team Épée	Romania (ROM)	Switzerland (SUI)	France (FRA)
Individual Sabre	Giovanni Scalzo (ITA)	Andrey Alshan (URS)	Vasil Etropolski (BUL)
Team Sabre	Italy (ITA)	Soviet Union (URS)	Romania (ROM)

=== Women's events ===
Event	Gold	Silver	Bronze
Individual Foil	Ana Dimitrenko (URS)	Aurora Dan (ROM)	Flora Chaldaeyeva (URS)
Team Foil	Romania (ROM)	Soviet Union (URS)	Hungary (HUN)

== Medal table ==
Rank	Nation	Gold	Silver	Bronze	Total
1	Italy (ITA)	3	0	1	4
2	Soviet Union (URS)	2	4	1	7
3	Romania (ROM)	2	2	1	5
4	Sweden (SWE)	1	0	0	1
5	France (FRA)	0	1	1	2
6	Switzerland (SUI)	0	1	0	1
7	Hungary (HUN)	0	0	2	2
8	Bulgaria (BUL)	0	0	1	1
8	Cuba (CUB)	0	0	1	1
Totals (9 entries)		8	8	8	24
