= Miguel Roca =

Spanish fencer

Personal information
- Born: 21 April 1955 (age 71) Barcelona, Spain

Sport
- Sport: Fencing

Miguel Roca (born 21 April 1955) is a Spanish fencer. He competed in the individual foil event at the 1980 Summer Olympics.
