= Aleksandr Abushakhmetov =

Soviet fencer (1954–1996)

Personal information
- Born: 21 July 1954 Frunze, Kirghiz SSR, Soviet Union
- Died: 10 June 1996 (aged 41) Moscow, Russian Federation

Sport
- Sport: Fencing
Medal record
Men's fencing
Representing Soviet Union
Olympic Games
Bronze medal – third place	1980 Moscow	Épée, team

Aleksandr Veniaminovich Abushakhmetov (Russian: Александр Вениаминович Абушахметов; 21 July 1954 – 10 June 1996) was a Soviet fencer. He won a bronze medal in the team épée event at the 1980 Summer Olympics.
