= Johan Harmenberg =

Swedish fencer (born 1954)

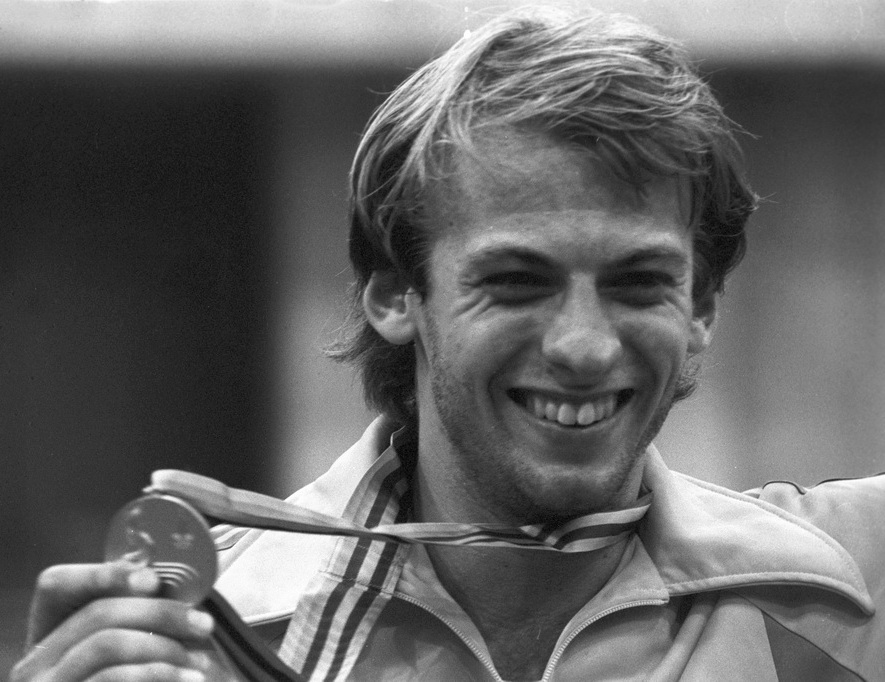

Personal information
- Full name: Johan Georg Harmenberg Åkerman
- Nationality: Swedish
- Born: 8 September 1954 (age 71) Stockholm, Sweden
- Height: 179 cm (5 ft 10 in)
- Weight: 71 kg (157 lb)

Sport
- Country: Sweden
- Sport: Fencing
- Event: épée
- College team: MIT Engineers
- Club: Föreningen för Fäktkonstens Främjande

Achievements and titles
- Olympic finals: 1980 Moscow Olympic Games gold medal in Individual Épée
- World finals: 1977 World Championship titles in Individual Épée and Team Épée
- National finals: 12 Swedish national championships, five silver medals, and six bronze medals
Medal record
Men's fencing
Representing Sweden
Olympic Games
Gold medal – first place	1980 Moscow	Individual epée

Johan Georg Harmenberg Åkerman (born 8 September 1954) is a Swedish former Olympic gold medalist and a World champion épée fencer.

== Early life ==
Harmenberg was born in Stockholm, Sweden, and is Jewish. He attended the Massachusetts Institute of Technology (MIT).

== University ==
He completed two years of study at MIT in 1975, during which time he went by the name Johan Akerman. He left MIT two years early (he would have graduated in 1977) and returned to Sweden, having been drafted by the Swedish Army in the summer of 1974.

He subsequently studied at Stockholm University. He holds an MD and a PhD in virology from Karolinska Institute, Stockholm, Sweden.

== Fencing career ==
He fenced for the club Föreningen för Fäktkonstens Främjande in Sweden. He was a Swedish national junior champion. He has won eight total épée gold medals in both individual and team competitions at Olympic, World Championships, and World Cup tournaments. He also won 12 Swedish national championships, as well as five silver medals and six bronze medals at Swedish national championships.

=== University ===
Åkerman fenced foil for the MIT fencing team, the MIT Engineers. He won the 1974 Intercollegiate Fencing Association foil championship, and won the bronze medal in the 1974 NCAA Fencing Foil Championship with a record of 18–5. It was MIT's first weapon title at the competition in 43 years. Åkerman was awarded MIT's 1974 Varsity Club Award, as the school's "Outstanding Freshmen Athlete of the Year."

=== World Championships ===
He won the 1977 World Championship titles in individual épée and team épée in Buenos Aires, Argentina. He also won a bronze medal in team épée at the 1979 World Championships in Hamburg, Germany.

=== World Cups ===
Harmenberg captured three individual épée World Cup championships within four years: 1977 (Bern), 1979 (Heidenheim), and 1980 (Heidenheim). He also won team titles at the 1977 and 1980 World Cups.

=== Olympics ===
At the 1980 Moscow Olympic Games, Harmenberg won a gold medal in the individual épée. In three of the final matches he won by only one touch. He is the only Swede to have won an individual gold medal in fencing. Harmenberg was a member of the Swedish épée team as well; the team placed 5th in the team épée competition.

== Hall of Fame ==
Harmenberg, who is Jewish, was inducted into the International Jewish Sports Hall of Fame in 1997.

== Biotech career ==
Harmenberg is an Associate Professor (Docent) of Virology at Karolinska Institute.

He became a biotech executive and researcher. He has been the global medical director for Pharmacia Upjohn (1995–97), vice president of pharmaceutical development for Medivir AB (1997–2006), chief medical officer at Algeta AB (2006–07), chief executive officer at Axelar AB (2007–15) and Akinion AB (2009–15), and chief medical officer of Oncopeptides AB until he reached their retirement age (2012–21). In September 2019, Harmenberg joined Beactica Therapeutics, a Swedish drug discovery company, as a clinical advisor. In November 2021, he was appointed chief medical officer of LIDDS AB.

== Scholarship ==
Harmenberg is the author of over 100 publications in scientific literature. Harmenberg co-authored scientific papers entitled "Fencing: Biomedical and Psychological Factors," "Comparison of different tests of fencing performance" (1991), and "Physiological and morphological characteristics of world class fencers" (1990). Harmenberg has also had a distinguished career in medical pharmacology, publishing a variety of papers relating to viral immunology.

Harmenberg co-authored Épée 2.0: The Birth of the New Fencing Paradigm, and Épée 2.5: The New Paradigm Revised and Augmented. and Epee 2.6. In these books, he describes the new fencing paradigm that he developed with Maestro Eric Sollee, from MIT, which resulted in his victories and a transformation in how épée is fenced at the higher levels of competition.

== Personal life ==
His son Karl Harmenberg fenced épée for Harvard University, and as a junior in 2008–09 won the gold medal at the NCAA Regionals and was selected to All-Ivy League second team.

== See also ==
- List of Jewish Olympic medalists
- List of Olympic medalists for Sweden
- List of Olympic medalists in fencing (men)
