= René Peroy =

American fencer

Personal information
- Born: June 22, 1885 Paris, France
- Died: September 17, 1963 (aged 78) Massachusetts, United States

Sport
- Sport: Fencing

René Peroy (June 22, 1885 – September 17, 1963) was an American fencer. He competed in the team foil event at the 1928 Summer Olympics.
