= Michel Salesse =

French fencer (born 1955)

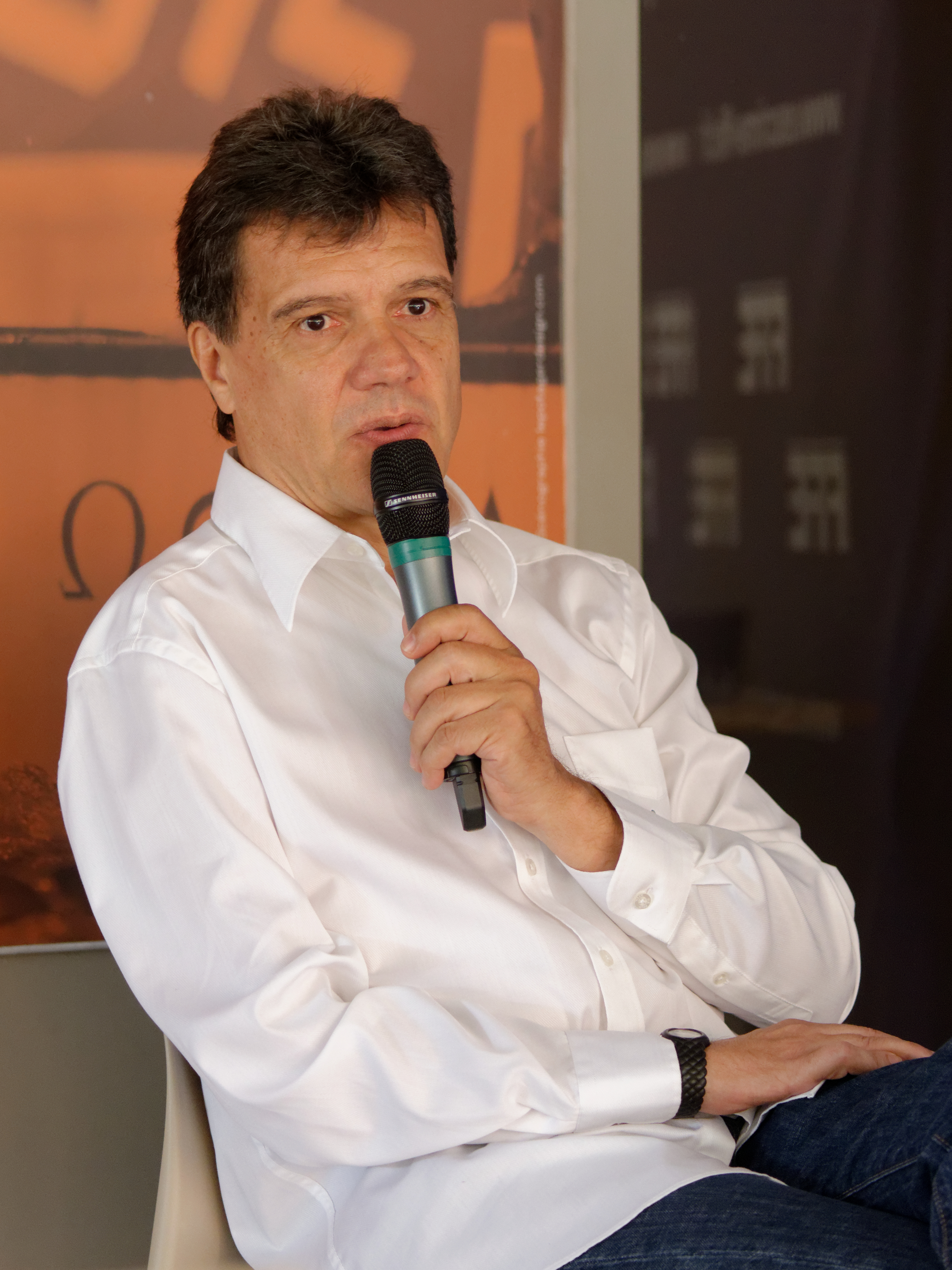
- Michel Salesse (2013)

Personal information
- Born: 3 January 1955 (age 71) Algiers, French Algeria

Sport
- Sport: Fencing
Medal record
Men's fencing
Representing France
Olympic Games
Gold medal – first place	1980 Moscow	Épée, team
Silver medal – second place	1984 Los Angeles	Épée, team

Michel Salesse (born 3 January 1955) is a French fencer. He won a gold medal in the team épée at the 1980 Summer Olympics and a silver in the same event at the 1984 Summer Olympics.
