= Péter Takács (fencer, born 1956) =

Hungarian fencer

Personal information
- Born: 4 March 1956 (age 70) Budapest, Hungary

Sport
- Sport: Fencing

Péter Takács (born 4 March 1956) is a Hungarian fencer. He competed in the team épée event at the 1980 Summer Olympics.
