= Sabirzhan Ruziyev =

Uzbek fencer (1953–2026)

Personal information
- Born: 15 June 1953 Belovodskoye, Frunze Oblast, Kirghiz SSR, Soviet Union
- Died: 22 August 2026 (aged 73) Tashkent, Uzbekistan

Sport
- Sport: Fencing
Medal record
Men's fencing
Representing Soviet Union
Olympic Games
Silver medal – second place	1980 Moscow	Team foil
World Championships
Gold medal – first place	1974 Grenoble	Team foil
Gold medal – first place	1979 Melbourne	Team foil
Gold medal – first place	1981 Clermont-Ferrand	Team foil
Silver medal – second place	1975 Budapest	Team foil
Bronze medal – third place	1977 Buenos Aires	Team foil
Bronze medal – third place	1978 Hamburg	Team foil
Summer Universiade
Gold medal – first place	1973 Moscow	Team foil
Gold medal – first place	1977 Sofia	Individual foil
Gold medal – first place	1977 Sofia	Team foil

Sabirzhan Sabitovich Ruziyev (Uzbek: Sobirjon Roʻziyev; Russian: Сабиржан Сабитович Рузиев; 15 June 1953 – 22 August 2026) was a Soviet fencer. He won a silver medal in the team foil event at the 1980 Summer Olympics. Ruziyev died on 22 August 2026, at the age of 73.
