= Lech Koziejowski =

Polish fencer (born 1949)

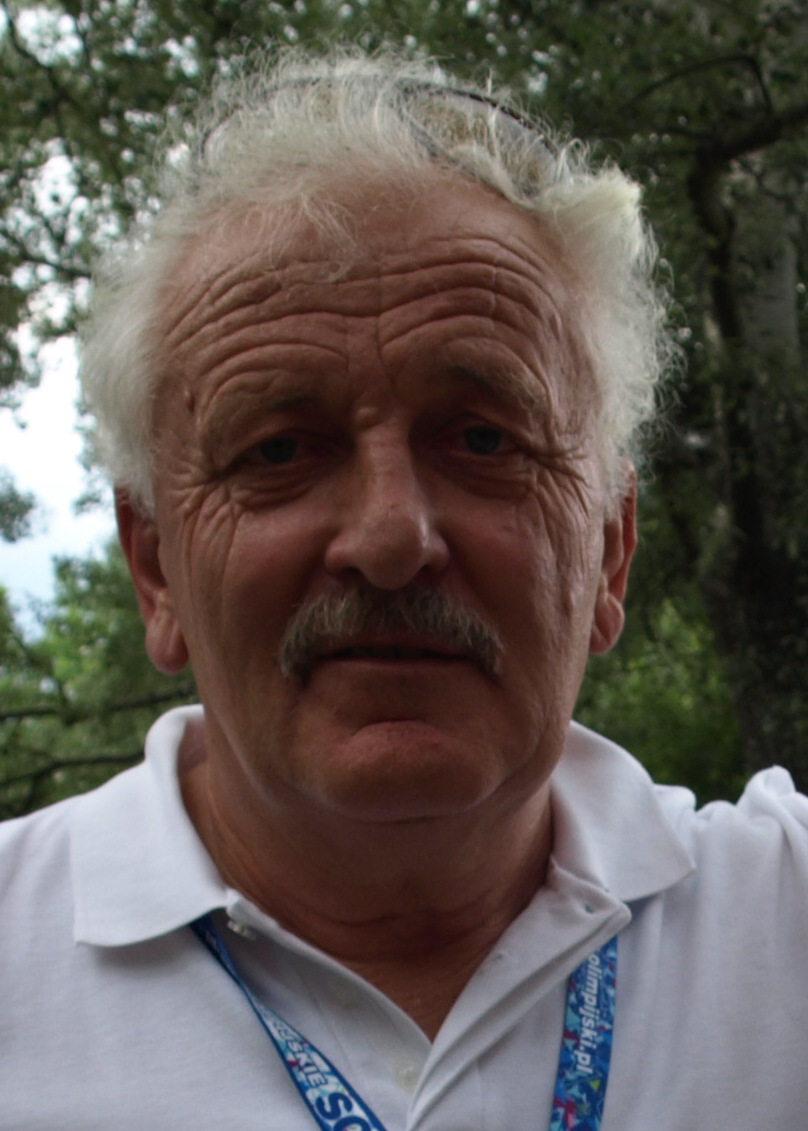

Personal information
- Born: 3 April 1949 (age 77) Warsaw, Poland

Sport
- Sport: Fencing
Medal record
Men's fencing
Representing Poland
Olympic Games
Gold medal – first place	1972 Munich	Foil, team
Bronze medal – third place	1980 Moscow	Foil, team

Lech Koziejowski (born 3 April 1949) is a Polish fencer. He won a gold medal in the team foil event at the 1972 Summer Olympics and a bronze in the same event at the 1980 Summer Olympics.
