= Kimmo Puranen =

Finnish fencer

Personal information
- Born: 10 October 1958 (age 67) Helsinki, Finland

Sport
- Sport: Fencing

Kimmo Puranen (born 10 October 1958) is a Finnish fencer. He competed in the team épée event at the 1980 Summer Olympics.
