= Sorin Roca =

Romanian fencer

Personal information
- Born: 12 February 1960 (age 66)

Sport
- Sport: Fencing

Sorin Roca (born 12 February 1960) is a Romanian fencer. He competed in the team foil event at the 1980 Summer Olympics.
