= Piotr Jabłkowski =

Polish fencer (born 1958)

Personal information
- Born: 10 March 1958 (age 68) Opole, Poland

Sport
- Sport: Fencing
Medal record
Men's fencing
Representing Poland
Olympic Games
| Silver medal – second place | 1980 Moscow | Épée, team |

Piotr Jabłkowski (born 10 March 1958) is a Polish fencer. He won a silver medal in the team épée event at the 1980 Summer Olympics.
