= José Pérez (fencer) =

Spanish fencer

Personal information
- Born: 21 February 1958 (age 68)

Sport
- Sport: Fencing

José Pérez (born 21 February 1958) is a Spanish fencer. He competed in the individual épée event at the 1980 Summer Olympics.
