= Andrzej Lis =

Polish fencer (born 1959)

Personal information
- Born: 16 December 1959 (age 66) Wrocław, Poland
- Height: 185 cm (6 ft 1 in)

Sport
- Sport: Fencing
Medal record
Men's fencing
Representing Poland
Olympic Games
Silver medal – second place	1980 Moscow	Épée, team

Andrzej Lis (born 16 December 1959) is a Polish fencer. He won a silver medal in the team épée event at the 1980 Summer Olympics.
