= Peter Grönholm =

Finnish fencer

Personal information
- Born: 14 September 1958 (age 68) Helsinki, Finland

Sport
- Sport: Fencing

Peter Grönholm (born 14 September 1958 in Helsinki, Finland) is a Finnish fencer. He competed in the men's team épée event at the 1980 Summer Olympics, where the Finnish team finished ninth.
