= Leszek Swornowski =

Polish fencer (born 1955)

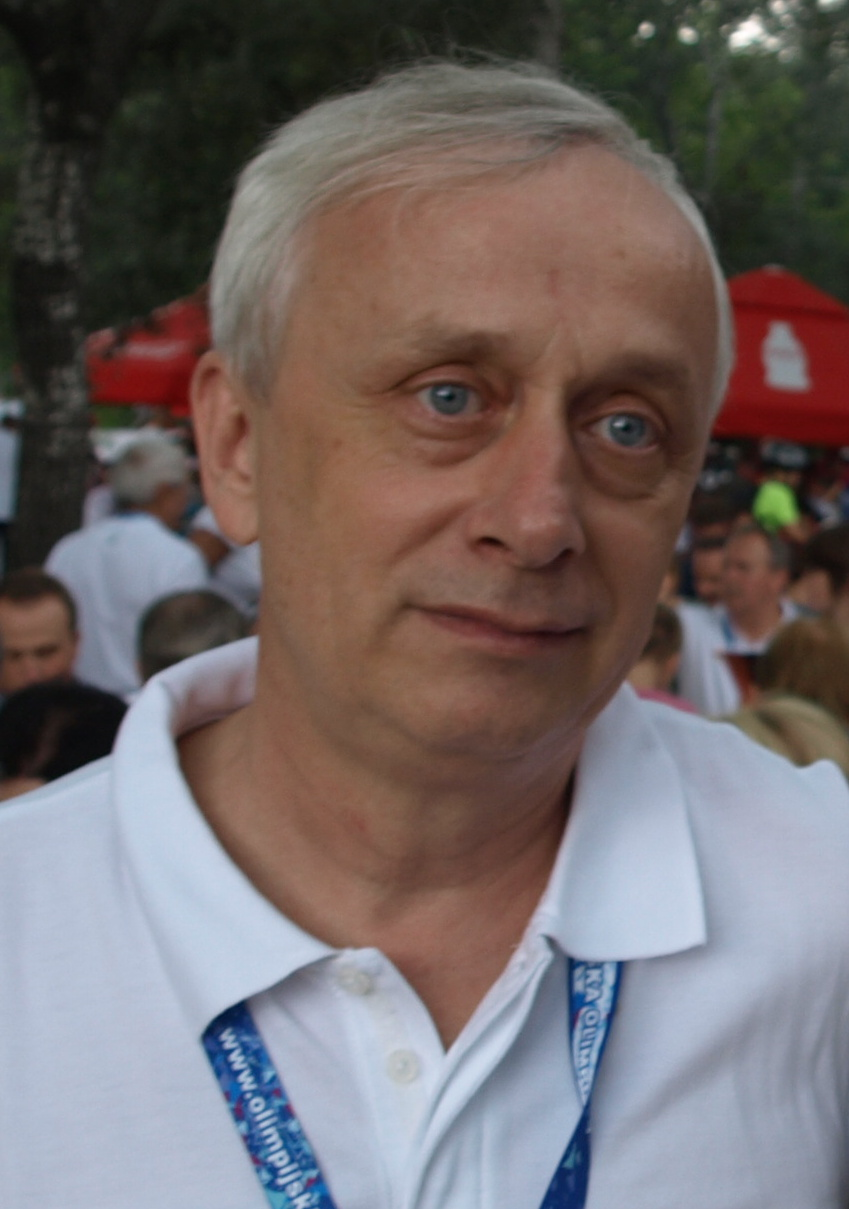
- Leszek Swornowski (2013)

Personal information
- Born: 28 March 1955 (age 71) Wrocław, Poland

Sport
- Sport: Fencing
Medal record
Men's fencing
Representing Poland
Olympic Games
Silver medal – second place	1980 Moscow	Épée, team

Leszek Swornowski (born 28 March 1955) is a Polish fencer. He won a silver medal in the team épée event at the 1980 Summer Olympics.
