= István Szelei =

Hungarian fencer (born 1960)

Personal information
- Born: 7 December 1960 (age 65) Szentes, Hungary

Sport
- Sport: Fencing
Medal record
Men's fencing
Representing Hungary
Olympic Games
Bronze medal – third place	1988 Seoul	Team foil
World Championships
Bronze medal – third place	1987 Lausanne	Team foil
Summer Universiade
Gold medal – first place	1985 Kobe	Team foil
Silver medal – second place	1987 Zagreb	Individual foil

István Szelei (born 7 December 1960) is a Hungarian former fencer. He won a bronze medal in the team foil event at the 1988 Summer Olympics.
