= Vladimir Smirnov (fencer) =

Ukrainian Soviet fencer

Vladimir Viktorovich Smirnov
Personal information
- Born: Влади́мир Ви́кторович Смирно́в; 20 May 1954 Rubizhne, Ukrainian SSR, Soviet Union
- Died: 29 July 1982 (aged 28) Rome, Italy
- Height: 185 cm (6 ft 1 in)
- Weight: 78 kg (172 lb)

Sport
- Sport: Fencing
- Event(s): Foil and épée
Medal record
Men's fencing
Representing Soviet Union
Olympic Games
Gold medal – first place	1980 Moscow	Foil individual
Silver medal – second place	1980 Moscow	Foil team
Bronze medal – third place	1980 Moscow	Men's team épée
World Championships
Bronze medal – third place	1977 Buenos Aires	Foil team
Bronze medal – third place	1978 Hamburg	Foil team
Gold medal – first place	1979 Melbourne	Foil team
Gold medal – first place	1981 Clermont-Ferrand	Foil individual
Gold medal – first place	1981 Clermont-Ferrand	Foil team
Gold medal – first place	1982 Rome	Foil team
Universiade
Silver medal – second place	1979 Mexico City	Foil individual
Gold medal – first place	1979 Mexico City	Foil team
Gold medal – first place	1981 Bucharest	Foil individual
Silver medal – second place	1981 Bucharest	Foil team

Vladimir Viktorovich Smirnov (Russian: Влади́мир Ви́кторович Смирно́в, Ukrainian: Володимир Вікторович Смирнов; 20 May 1954 – 29 July 1982) was a Soviet foil and épée fencer. He was the 1980 Olympic champion in men's foil, and the 1981 world champion in men's foil. He was killed accidentally in a bout during the 1982 World Fencing Championships in Rome, Italy.

== Early life ==
Smirnov was born in Rubizhne, Ukrainian SSR, in the Soviet Union.

== Fencing career ==
At the 1979 Summer Universiade in Ciudad de México Smirnov won a gold medal in foil team, and a silver medal in individual foil. At the 1981 Summer Universiade in București he won a gold medal in individual foil, and a silver medal in foil team.

At the 1977 World Fencing Championships in Buenos Aires he won a bronze medal in foil team, and at the 1978 World Fencing Championships in Hamburg Smirnov again won a bronze medal in foil team. At the 1979 World Fencing Championships in Melbourne he won a gold medal in foil team, and at the 1981 World Fencing Championships in Clermont-Ferrand he won gold medals in both individual foil and foil team. At the 1982 World Fencing Championships in Rome he was awarded the gold medal in foil team.

Smirnov won the gold medal in individual men's foil at the 1980 Summer Olympics, as well as a silver medal in foil team and a bronze medal in épée team.

== Death ==
During the 1982 World Fencing Championships in Rome, Italy, in the team foil event the 28-year-old world champion Smirnov, ranked #1 in the world, was fencing 27-year-old Matthias Behr of West Germany, ranked #2 in the world, on 19 July in the quarter-finals of the team event. The two fencers initiated a simultaneous attack. Behr's foil blade broke during the action, and the jagged broken blade penetrated through the mesh of Smirnov's fencing mask, through his left eye orbit, and into the frontal lobe of his brain.

An Agostino Gemelli University Policlinic spokesman said "Smirnov's heart is still functioning, but other bodily functions are being maintained by artificial means." State-run television said he was "clinically dead". A later communique from the hospital said he was in a deep coma, was not responding to treatment, and had no brain reflexes.

Smirnov died nine days later. He was buried in Kyiv, where he had been living.

=== Aftermath ===
Smirnov's accident was the driving force behind the significant improvement of safety gear in fencing. For example, the use of maraging steel blades (less likely to break than the carbon steel ones of the day), kevlar (or other ballistic nylon) in the uniforms, and masks two to three times stronger than the one he wore, all came about because of his death. The improvements greatly decreased the number of severe injuries in fencing, making it one of the safest competitive sports in the world. A five-year study by Willamette University sports science professor Dr. Peter Harmer in 2005 found that fencing is especially safe for children and novices; that soccer was 14 times more dangerous than fencing, and basketball 10 times more dangerous, and that of the 22 sports examined in the study, fencing was tied with golf as having the lowest risk to competitors.

Forty years later, amidst the Russian invasion of Ukraine, Behr called Smirnov's former wife in Ukraine, and gave her son-in-law and two grandchildren refuge during the war.
