= Adam Robak =

Polish fencer (born 1957)

Personal information
- Full name: Adam Ryszard Robak
- Born: 16 July 1957 (age 69) Warsaw, Poland

Sport
- Sport: Fencing
Medal record
Men's fencing
Representing Poland
Olympic Games
Bronze medal – third place	1980 Moscow	Team foil
World Championships
Gold medal – first place	1978 Hamburg	Team foil
Summer Universiade
Gold medal – first place	1985 Kobe	Individual foil
Silver medal – second place	1977 Sofia	Team foil

Adam Ryszard Robak (born 16 July 1957) is a retired Polish fencer. He won a team gold medal at the 1978 World Fencing Championships in Hamburg and a bronze medal in the team foil event at the 1980 Summer Olympics.
