= Hubert Gardas =

French fencer (born 1957)

Personal information
- Born: 17 April 1957 (age 69) Lyon, France

Sport
- Sport: Fencing
Medal record
Men's fencing
Representing France
Olympic Games
Gold medal – first place	1980 Moscow	Épée, team
Mediterranean Games
Bronze medal – third place	1979 Split	Individual épée

Hubert Gardas (born 17 April 1957) is a French fencer. He won a gold medal in the team épée at the 1980 Summer Olympics and a bronze medal in the individual épée event at the 1979 Mediterranean Games.

He is a graduate of HEC Paris.
