= Ioan Popa (fencer) =

Romanian fencer

Personal information
- Born: 22 April 1953 Bucharest, Romania
- Died: 3 August 2017 (aged 64)

Sport
- Sport: Fencing
- Events: Team épée; Individual épée

Ioan Popa (22 April 1953 – 3 August 2017) was a Romanian fencer. He competed at the 1976 (team épée) and 1980 Summer Olympics (team and individual épée).
