= Patrick Picot =

French fencer (born 1951)

Personal information
- Born: 22 September 1951 (age 74)

Sport
- Sport: Fencing
Medal record
Men's fencing
Representing France
Olympic Games
Gold medal – first place	1980 Moscow	Épée, team

Patrick Picot (born 22 September 1951) is a French fencer. He won a gold medal in the team épée at the 1980 Summer Olympics. He was also the vice-president of the French Fencing Federation from 2004 to 2008.
