= Mikko Salminen =

Finnish fencer

Personal information
- Born: 30 April 1959 (age 67) Helsinki, Finland

Sport
- Sport: Fencing

Mikko Salminen (born 30 April 1959) is a Finnish fencer. He competed in the individual and team épée events at the 1980 Summer Olympics.
