= Oldřich Kubišta =

Czech fencer (born 1960)

Personal information
- Born: 22 July 1960 (age 65)

Sport
- Sport: Fencing

Oldřich Kubišta (born 22 July 1960) is a former fencer for Czechoslovakia. He competed in the individual and team épée events at the 1980 Summer Olympics.
