= Klaus Haertter =

German fencer (born 1952)

Personal information
- Born: 22 July 1952 (age 73) Lauchhammer, East Germany

Sport
- Sport: Fencing
Medal record
Representing East Germany
Summer Universiade
Silver medal – second place	1977 Sofia	Individual foil
Bronze medal – third place	1979 Mexico City	Individual foil
Bronze medal – third place	1979 Mexico City	Team foil

Klaus Haertter (born 22 July 1952) is a German fencer. He competed for East Germany at the 1976 and 1980 Summer Olympics.
