= Aleksandr Mozhayev =

Soviet fencer

Personal information
- Born: 5 August 1958 (age 67) Vladikavkaz, Russia

Sport
- Sport: Fencing
Medal record
Men's fencing
Representing Soviet Union
Olympic Games
Bronze medal – third place	1980 Moscow	Épée, team

Aleksandr Mozhayev (born 5 August 1958) is a Soviet fencer. He won a bronze medal in the team épée event at the 1980 Summer Olympics.
