= László Demény =

Hungarian fencer

Personal information
- Born: 6 October 1953 (age 72) Budapest, Hungary

Sport
- Sport: Fencing

László Demény (born 6 October 1953) is a Hungarian fencer. He competed in the individual and team foil events at the 1980 Summer Olympics.
