= László Pető (fencer) =

Hungarian fencer

Personal information
- Born: 2 December 1948 (age 77) Debrecen, Hungary

Sport
- Sport: Fencing

László Pető (born 2 November 1948) is a Hungarian fencer. He competed in the individual and team épée events at the 1980 Summer Olympics.
