= Bogusław Zych =

Polish fencer (1951–1995)

Personal information
- Born: 10 December 1951 Warsaw, Poland
- Died: 3 April 1995 (aged 43) Naprawa, Poland

Sport
- Sport: Fencing
Medal record
Men's fencing
Representing Poland
Olympic Games
Bronze medal – third place	1980 Moscow	Foil, team

Bogusław Zych (10 December 1951 – 3 April 1995) was a Polish fencer. He won a bronze medal in the team foil event at the 1980 Summer Olympics. He died in a car crash in Poland.
