= Marco Falcone (fencer) =

Italian fencer (born 1959)

Personal information
- Born: 19 February 1959 (age 67) Vercelli, Italy

Sport
- Sport: Fencing

Marco Falcone (born 19 February 1959) is an Italian fencer. He competed in the individual épée event at the 1980 Summer Olympics.
