= Philippe Bonnin =

French fencer (born 1955)

Personal information
- Born: 30 April 1955 (age 71) Boulogne-Billancourt, Hauts-de-Seine, France
- Height: 172 cm (5 ft 8 in)
- Weight: 74 kg (163 lb)

Sport
- Sport: Fencing
Medal record
Men's fencing
Representing France
Olympic Games
Gold medal – first place	1980 Moscow	Foil, team

Philippe Bonnin (born 30 April 1955) is a French fencer. He won a gold medal in the team foil at the 1980 Summer Olympics.
