= Klaus Kotzmann =

German fencer

Personal information
- Born: 17 January 1960 (age 66) Wolfen, East Germany

Sport
- Sport: Fencing

Klaus Kotzmann (born 17 January 1960) is a German former fencer. He competed in the individual and team foil events for East Germany at the 1980 Summer Olympics.
