= Peder Planting =

Finnish fencer

Personal information
- Born: 6 June 1952 (age 74) Helsinki, Finland

Sport
- Sport: Fencing

Peder Planting (born 6 June 1952) is a Finnish fencer. He competed in the individual and team épée events at the 1980 Summer Olympics.
