= Pascal Jolyot =

French fencer (born 1958)

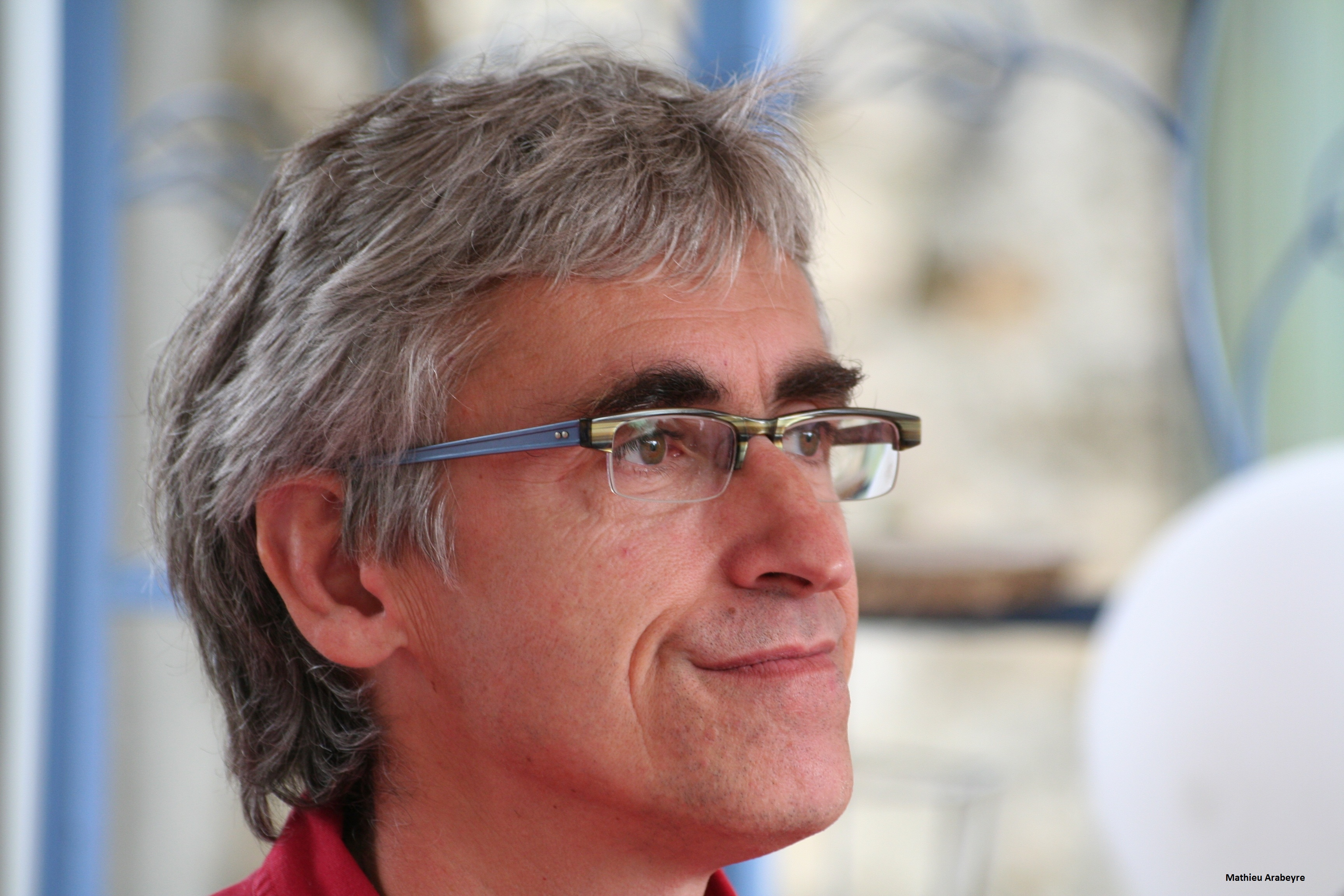

Personal information
- Born: 26 July 1958 (age 68) Fontainebleau, France

Sport
- Sport: Fencing
Medal record
Men's fencing
Representing France
Olympic Games
Gold medal – first place	1980 Moscow	Foil, team
Silver medal – second place	1980 Moscow	Foil, individual
Bronze medal – third place	1984 Los Angeles	Foil, team

Pascal Jolyot (pronounced [paskal ʒɔljo]; born 26 July 1958) is a French fencer. He won a gold medal in the team foil and a silver in the individual foil events at the 1980 Summer Olympics. He won a bronze medal in the team foil event at the 1984 Summer Olympics.
