= András Papp =

Hungarian fencer

Personal information
- Born: 6 November 1960 Budapest, Hungary
- Died: October 2011 (aged 50)

Sport
- Sport: Fencing

András Papp (6 November 1960 – October 2011) was a Hungarian fencer. He competed in the individual and team foil events at the 1980 Summer Olympics.
