= Neal Mallett =

British fencer

Personal information
- Born: 30 September 1957 (age 68) Berlin, Germany

Sport
- Sport: Fencing

Neal Mallett (born 30 September 1957) is a British fencer. He competed at the 1980 and 1984 Summer Olympics.
