= Fencing at the 1985 Summer Universiade =

Fencing events were contested at the 1985 Summer Universiade in Kobe, Japan.

== Medal overview ==
=== Men's events ===
Event	Gold	Silver	Bronze
Individual foil	Adam Robak (POL)	Michael Marx (USA)	Anvar Ibragimov (URS)
Team foil	Hungary (HUN)	France (FRA)	Italy (ITA)
Individual épée	Aleksandr Mochayev (URS)	Roberto Manzi (ITA)	Pedro Merencio (CUB)
Team épée	Soviet Union (URS)	Cuba (CUB)	Italy (ITA)
Individual sabre	Sergey Mindirgasov (URS)	László Csongrádi (HUN)	Vasil Etropolski (BUL)
Team sabre	Soviet Union (URS)	Bulgaria (BUL)	Italy (ITA)

=== Women's events ===
Event	Gold	Silver	Bronze
Individual foil	Jujie Luan (CHN)	Olga Voshchakina (URS)	Marina Soboleva (URS)
Team foil	Italy (ITA)	Soviet Union (URS)	West Germany (FRG)

== Medal table ==
Rank	Nation	Gold	Silver	Bronze	Total
1	Soviet Union (URS)	4	2	2	8
2	Italy (ITA)	1	1	3	5
3	Hungary (HUN)	1	1	0	2
4	China (CHN)	1	0	0	1
4	Poland (POL)	1	0	0	1
6	Bulgaria (BUL)	0	1	1	2
6	Cuba (CUB)	0	1	1	2
8	France (FRA)	0	1	0	1
8	United States (USA)	0	1	0	1
10	West Germany (FRG)	0	0	1	1
Totals (10 entries)		8	8	8	24
