= Petru Kuki =

Romanian fencer (born 1955)

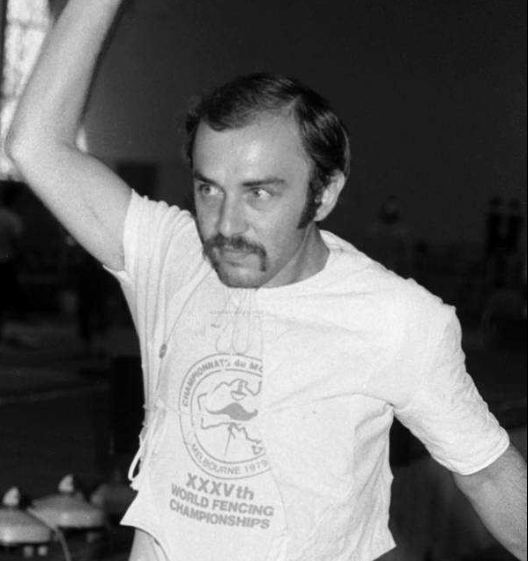

Personal information
- Born: 22 May 1955 (age 71) Satu Mare, Romania

Sport
- Sport: Fencing
Medal record
Representing Romania
World Championships
Silver medal – second place	1981 Clermont-Ferrand	Individual foil
Summer Universiade
Silver medal – second place	1981 Bucharest	Individual foil

Petru Kuki (born 22 May 1955) is a Romanian épée and foil fencer. He competed at the 1976, 1980 and 1984 Summer Olympics.
