= Didier Flament =

French fencer (born 1951)

Personal information
- Born: 4 January 1951 (age 75) Tourcoing, France

Sport
- Sport: Fencing
Medal record
Men's fencing
Representing France
Olympic Games
Gold medal – first place	1980 Moscow	Foil, team
Bronze medal – third place	1976 Montréal	Foil, team
Mediterranean Games
Gold medal – first place	1979 Split	Individual foil

Didier Flament (born 4 January 1951) is a French fencer. He won a gold medal in the team foil event at the 1980 Summer Olympics and a bronze in the same event at the 1976 Summer Olympics. He also won a gold medal in the individual foil event at the 1979 Mediterranean Games.
