= Anton Pongratz =

Romanian fencer

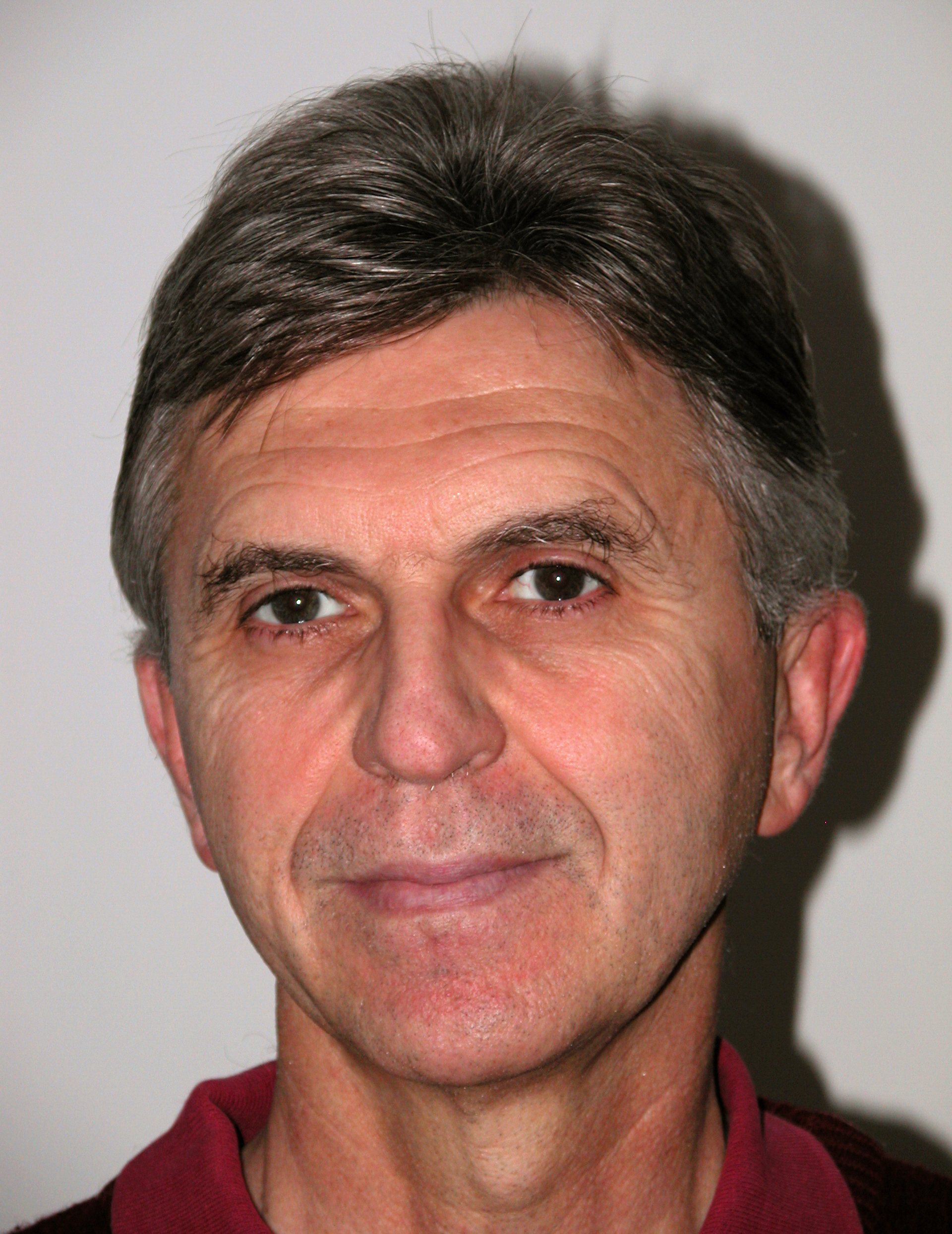

Personal information
- Born: Antal Pongrácz; 18 March 1948 Târgu Mureș, Romania
- Died: 18 March 2008 (aged 60)

Sport
- Sport: Fencing

Anton Pongratz (né Antal Pongrácz; 18 March 1948 – 18 March 2008) was a Romanian fencer. He competed in the individual and team épée events at the 1972, 1976 and 1980 Summer Olympics.

== Life ==
Antal Pongrácz was born on 18 March 1948 in Târgu Mureș, one of the children of Roman Catholic parents: Antal Pongrácz, a mechanic and locksmith in a textile factory, and Margit Mikola. In 1973, he married. He and his wife, Dr. Mária Pongrácz, had one child, István-Mátyás Pongrácz, who followed in his father's footsteps to become a dentist.
