= Frédéric Pietruszka =

French fencer (born 1954)

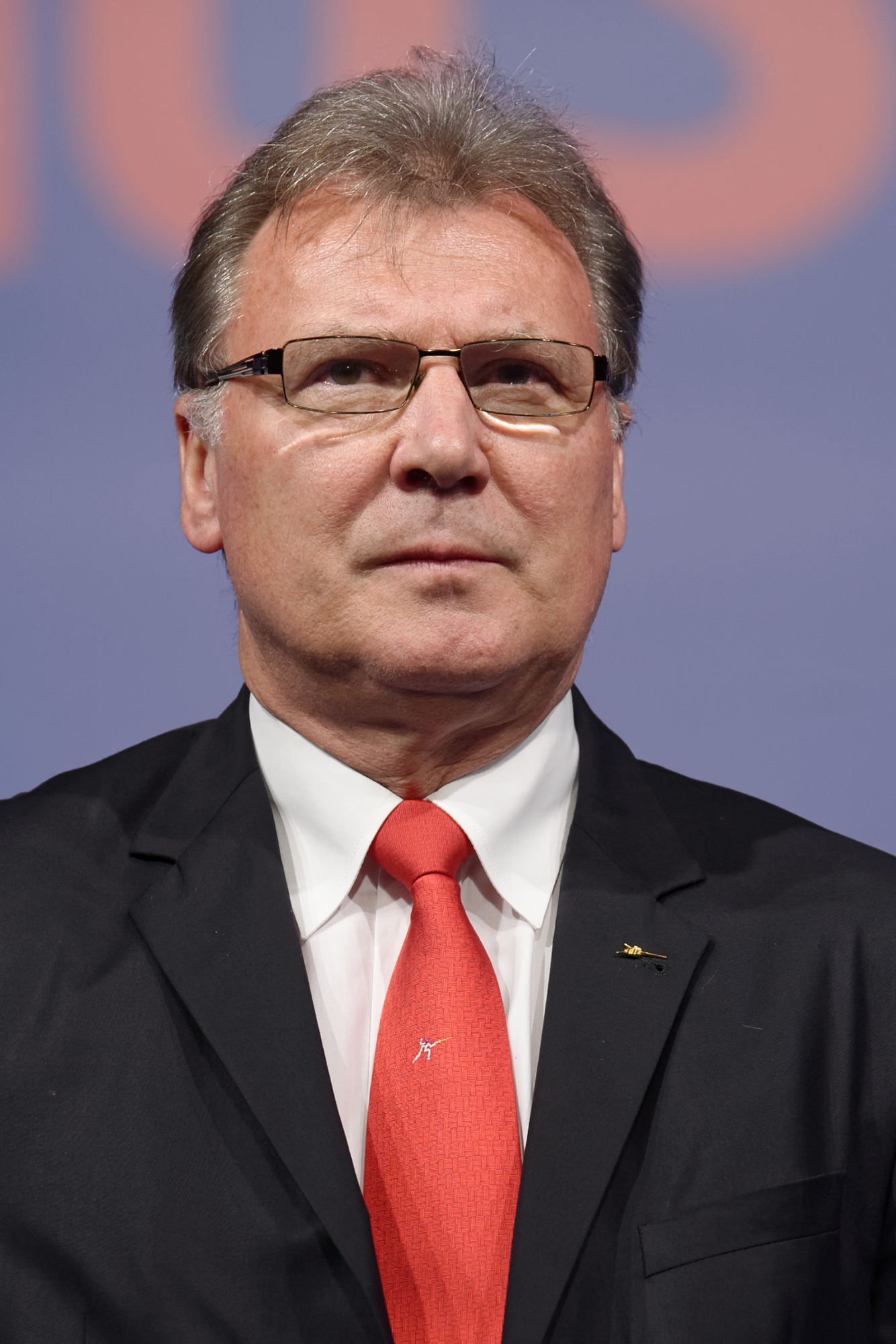

Personal information
- Born: 13 May 1954 (age 72) Villecresnes, France

Sport
- Sport: Fencing
Medal record
Men's fencing
Representing France
Olympic Games
Gold medal – first place	1980 Moscow	Foil, team
Bronze medal – third place	1976 Montréal	Foil, team
Bronze medal – third place	1984 Los Angeles	Foil, team

Frédéric Pietruszka (born 13 May 1954) is a French fencer. He won a gold medal in the team foil event at the 1980 Summer Olympics and a bronze in the same events at the 1976 and 1984 Summer Olympics.

He was president of the French Fencing Federation from 2005 to 2012. He is currently general secretary of the International Fencing Federation.
