= Efigenio Favier =

Cuban fencer (born 1959)

Personal information
- Born: 26 March 1959 (age 66)

Sport
- Sport: Fencing

Efigenio Favier (born 26 March 1959) is a Cuban fencer. He competed in the individual and team foil and épée events at the 1980 Summer Olympics.
