= Heriberto González =

Cuban fencer

Personal information
- Born: 23 March 1959 (age 67)

Sport
- Sport: Fencing

Heriberto González (born 23 March 1959) is a Cuban fencer. He competed in the individual and team foil and épée events at the 1980 Summer Olympics.
