= Fencing at the 2000 Summer Olympics – Men's sabre =

Fencing at the Olympics

Men's sabre at the Games of the XXVII Olympiad
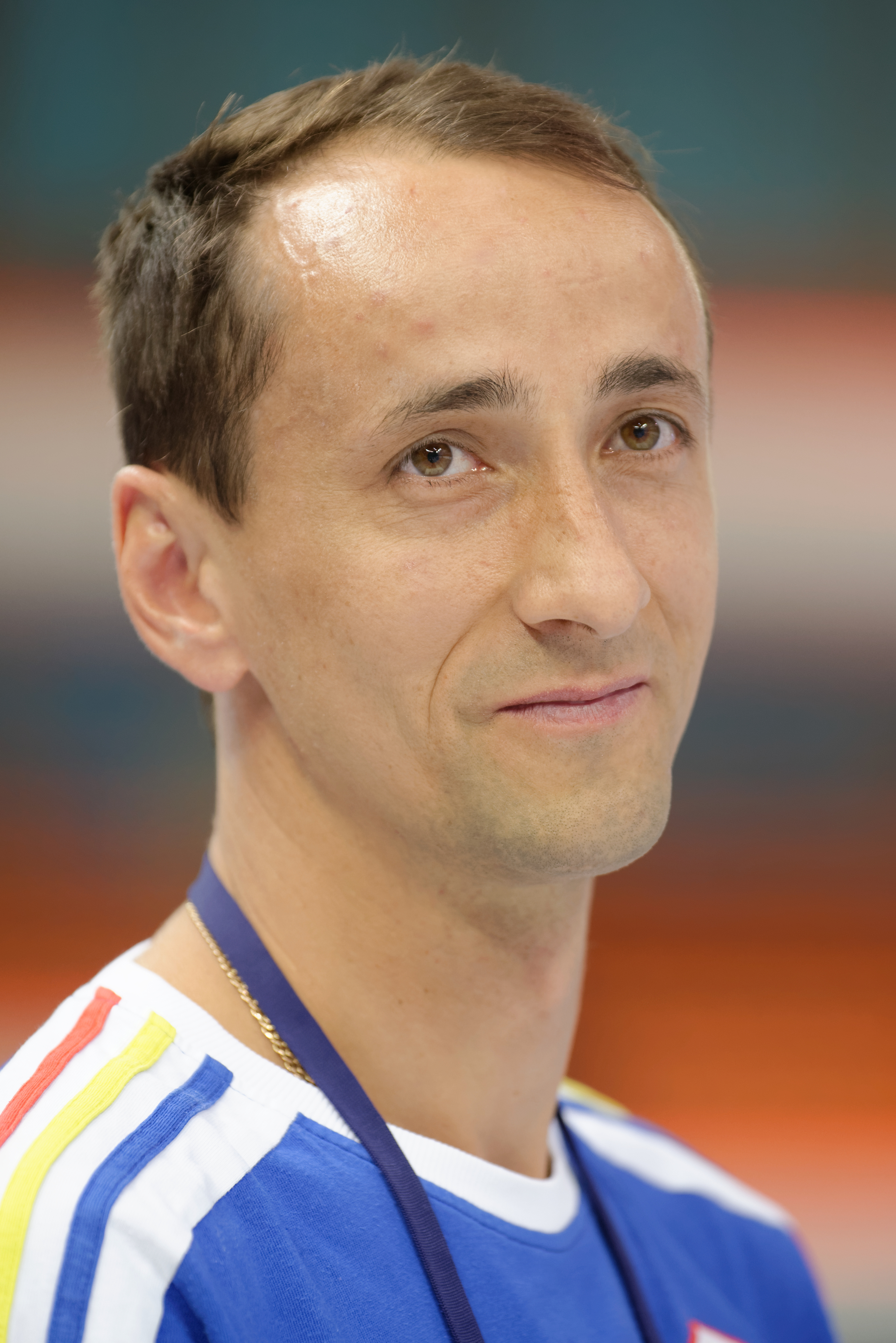
- Mihai Covaliu (2015)
- Venue: Sydney Exhibition Centre
- Dates: 21 September 2000
- Competitors: 39 from 20 nations

Medalists
1st place, gold medalist(s)		Mihai Covaliu	Romania
2nd place, silver medalist(s)		Mathieu Gourdain	France
3rd place, bronze medalist(s)		Wiradech Kothny	Germany

The men's sabre was one of ten fencing events on the fencing at the 2000 Summer Olympics programme. It was the twenty-fourth appearance of the event. The competition was held on 21 September 2000. 39 fencers from 20 nations competed. Nations had been limited to three fencers each since 1928. The event was won by Mihai Covaliu of Romania, the nation's first medal in the men's sabre. Mathieu Gourdain's silver extended France's podium streak in the event to five Games. Germany also earned its first medal in the men's sabre, with Wiradech Kothny's bronze.

== Background ==
This was the 24th appearance of the event, which is the only fencing event to have been held at every Summer Olympics. Five of the quarterfinalists from 1996 returned: gold medalist Stanislav Pozdnyakov and silver medalist Sergey Sharikov of Russia, bronze medalist Damien Touya of France, sixth-place finisher Vadym Huttsait of Ukraine, and seventh-place finisher Rafał Sznajder of Poland. The three world champions since the Atlanta Games were Pozdnyakov (1997), Luigi Tarantino of Italy (1998), and Touya (1999).

Belarus and Kazakhstan each made their debut in the men's sabre. Italy made its 22nd appearance in the event, most of any nation, having missed the inaugural 1896 event and the 1904 Games.

== Competition format ==
The 1996 tournament had vastly simplified the competition format into a single-elimination bracket, with a bronze medal match. The 2000 tournament continued to use that format. Bouts were to 15 touches. Standard sabre rules regarding target area, striking, and priority were used.

== Schedule ==
All times are Australian Eastern Standard Time (UTC+10)

Date	Time	Round
Thursday, 21 September 2000	9:30; 17:30	Round of 64; Round of 32; Round of 16; Quarterfinals; Semifinals; Bronze medal match Final

== Results ==
The field of 40 fencers competed in a single-elimination tournament to determine the medal winners. Semifinal losers proceeded to a bronze medal match.

=== Section 1 ===
Round of 64
Zhao Chunsheng; China	15
Akhnaten Spencer-El (USA)	10

Round of 32
Stanislav Pozdnyakov (RUS)	15
Zhao Chunsheng; China	11
Fernando Medina; Spain	14
Mathieu Gourdain (FRA)	15
Luigi Tarantino; Italy	10
Victor Găureanu (ROU)	15
Julien Pillet (FRA)	15
Alberto Falcón (ESP)	12

Round of 16
Stanislav Pozdnyakov (RUS)	11
Mathieu Gourdain (FRA)	15
Victor Găureanu (ROU)	15
Julien Pillet (FRA)	10

Quarterfinals
Mathieu Gourdain (FRA)	15
Victor Găureanu (ROU)	14

=== Section 2 ===
Round of 64
Laurent Waller (SUI)	13
Lee Seung-Won (KOR)	15
Florin Lupeică (ROM)	15
Cándido Maya (CUB)	10

Round of 32
Domonkos Ferjancsik (HUN)	15
Lee Seung-Won (KOR)	4
Vadym Huttsait (UKR)	15
Rafał Sznajder (POL)	14
Csaba Köves (HUN)	15
Florin Lupeică (ROM)	14
Tonhi Terenzi (ITA)	15
Volodymyr Kaliuzhniy (UKR)	10

Round of 16
Domonkos Ferjancsik (HUN)	15
Vadym Huttsait (UKR)	10
Csaba Köves (HUN)	14
Tonhi Terenzi (ITA)	15

Quarterfinals
Domonkos Ferjancsik (HUN)	15
Tonhi Terenzi (ITA)	13

=== Section 3 ===
Round of 64
Volodymyr Lukashenko (UKR)	15
Masashi Nagara (JPN)	7
James Williams (GBR)	15
Diego Drajer (ARG)	13

Round of 32
Sergey Sharikov (RUS)	15
Volodymyr Lukashenko (UKR)	11
Eero Lehmann (GER)	8
Wiradech Kothny (GER)	15
Zsolt Nemcsik (HUN)	10
James Williams (GBR)	15
Marcin Sobala (POL)	8
Aleksey Frosin (RUS)	15

Round of 16
Sergey Sharikov (RUS)	14
Wiradech Kothny (GER)	15
James Williams (GBR)	8
Aleksey Frosin (RUS)	15

Quarterfinals
Wiradech Kothny (GER)	15
Aleksey Frosin (RUS)	12

=== Section 4 ===
Round of 64
Dmitry Lapkes (BLR)	15
Mahmoud Samir (EGY)	7
Keeth Smart (USA)	15
Igor Tsel (KAZ)	5

Round of 32
Raffaelo Caserta (ITA)	9
Dmitry Lapkes (BLR)	15
Norbert Jaskot (POL)	12
Mihai Covaliu (ROM)	15
Jorge Pina (ESP)	14
Dennis Bauer (GER)	15
Keeth Smart (USA)	8
Damien Touya (FRA)	15

Round of 16
Dmitry Lapkes (BLR)	11
Mihai Covaliu (ROM)	15
Dennis Bauer (GER)	12
Damien Touya (FRA)	15

Quarterfinals
Mihai Covaliu (ROM)	15
Damien Touya (FRA)	12

=== Finals ===
Semifinals
Mathieu Gourdain (FRA)	15
Domonkos Ferjancsik (HUN)	12
Wiradech Kothny (GER)	12
Mihai Covaliu (ROU)	15

Final
Mathieu Gourdain (FRA)	12
Mihai Covaliu (ROU)	15
Bronze medal match
Domonkos Ferjancsik (HUN)	11
Wiradech Kothny (GER)	15

== Final classification ==
Rank	Fencer	Nation
1st place, gold medalist(s)	Mihai Covaliu	Romania
2nd place, silver medalist(s)	Mathieu Gourdain	France
3rd place, bronze medalist(s)	Wiradech Kothny	Germany
4	Domonkos Ferjancsik	Hungary
5	Damien Touya	France
6	Aleksey Frosin	Russia
7	Tonhi Terenzi	Italy
8	Victor Găureanu	Romania
9	Stanislav Pozdnyakov	Russia
10	Sergey Sharikov	Russia
11	Csaba Köves	Hungary
12	Julien Pillet	France
13	Vadym Huttsait	Ukraine
14	Dennis Bauer	Germany
15	Dmitry Lapkes	Belarus
16	James Williams	Great Britain
17	Zsolt Nemcsik	Hungary
18	Luigi Tarantino	Italy
19	Raffaello Caserta	Italy
20	Fernando Medina	Spain
21	Jorge Pina	Spain
22	Rafał Sznajder	Poland
23	Eero Lehmann	Germany
24	Marcin Sobala	Poland
25	Volodymyr Kaliuzhniy	Ukraine
26	Norbert Jaskot	Poland
27	Alberto Falcón	Spain
28	Florin Lupeică	Romania
29	Volodymyr Lukashenko	Ukraine
30	Keeth Smart	United States
31	Zhao Chunsheng	China
32	Lee Seung-Won	South Korea
33	Laurent Waller	Switzerland
34	Akhnaten Spencer-El	United States
35	Igor Tsel	Kazakhstan
36	Masashi Nagara	Japan
37	Diego Drajer	Argentina
38	Cándido Maya	Cuba
39	Mahmoud Samir	Egypt
