= Fencing at the 1996 Summer Olympics – Men's sabre =

Olympic fencing tournament

Men's sabre at the Games of the XXVI Olympiad
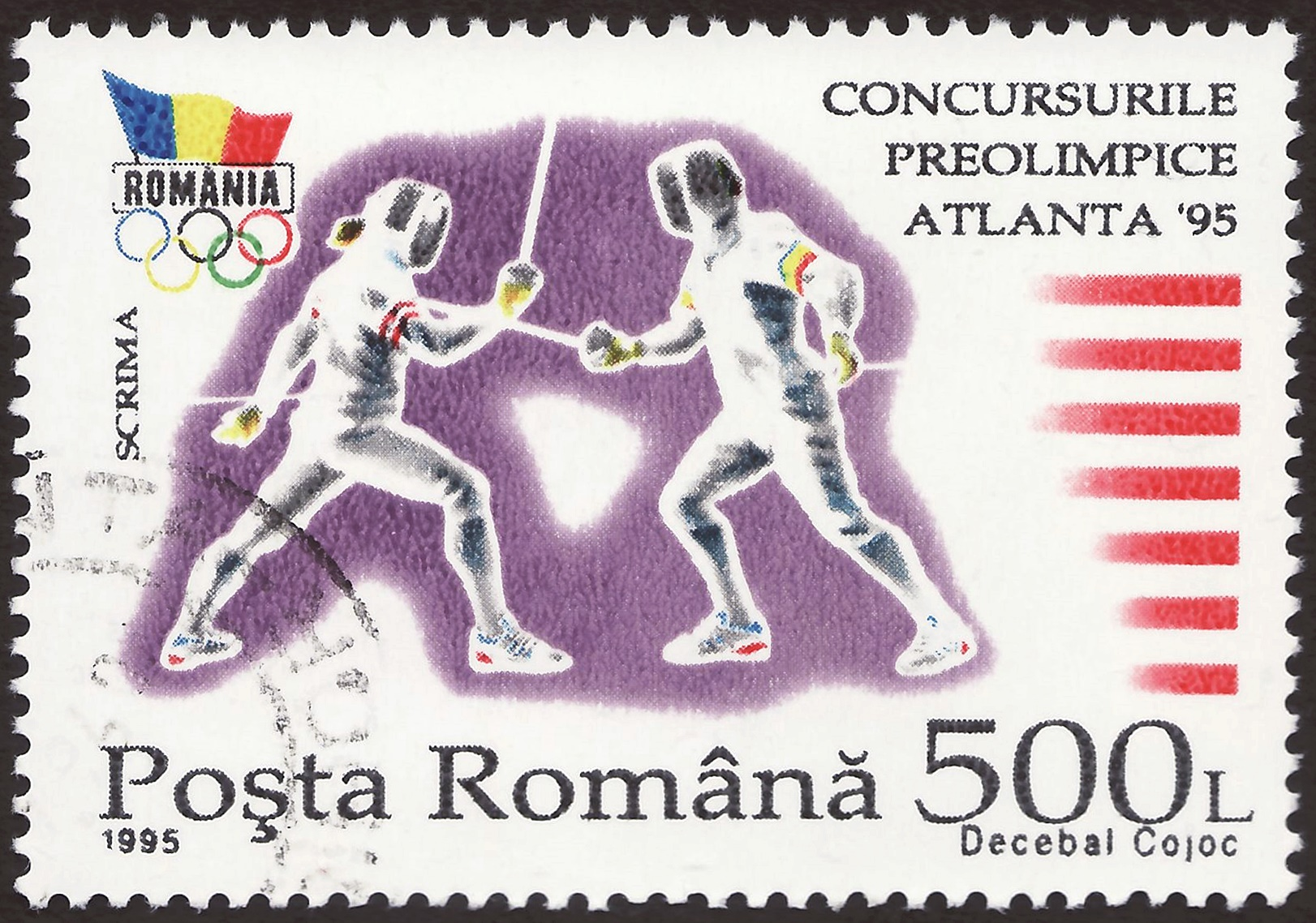
- Romanian stamp commemorating 1996 Olympic fencing
- Venue: Georgia World Congress Center
- Date: July 21, 1996
- Competitors: 43 from 20 nations

Medalists
1st place, gold medalist(s)		Stanislav Pozdnyakov	Russia
2nd place, silver medalist(s)		Sergey Sharikov	Russia
3rd place, bronze medalist(s)		Damien Touya	France

The men's sabre was one of ten fencing events on the fencing at the 1996 Summer Olympics programme. It was the twenty-third appearance of the event. The competition was held on July 21, 1996. 43 fencers from 20 nations competed. Nations had been limited to three fencers each since 1928. The event was won by Stanislav Pozdnyakov, prevailing over silver medalist Sergey Sharikov in an all-Russia final. The medals were the first for Russia as an independent nation, separate from the Soviet Union, in the men's sabre. Damien Touya of France won the bronze medal bout, extending France's podium streak to four Games.

== Background ==
This was the 23rd appearance of the event, which is the only fencing event to have been held at every Summer Olympics. Two of the quarterfinalists from 1992 returned: gold medalist Bence Szabó of Hungary and fifth-place finisher Antonio García of Spain. Grigory Kiriyenko of Russia had won two world championships (1989 and 1991) before the 1992 Games but suffered an early exit; he had won two more world championships (1993 and 1995) since then and hoped for better success in Atlanta. His teammates, Stanislav Pozdnyakov and Sergey Sharikov, also came into the tournament among the top five seeds. Germany's Felix Becker was also a world champion (1994).

Algeria, Azerbaijan, Georgia, and Ukraine each made their debut in the men's sabre; Russia competed separately from the other Soviet republics for the first time since 1912. Italy made its 21st appearance in the event, most of any nation, having missed the inaugural 1896 event and the 1904 Games.

== Competition format ==
The 1996 tournament vastly simplified the competition format after a horrendously complex system used in the previous Games in Barcelona. Pool play was eliminated. Double elimination was eliminated. The tournament became a simple single-elimination bracket, with a bronze medal match. Bouts were to 15 touches. Standard sabre rules regarding target area, striking, and priority were used.

== Schedule ==
All times are Eastern Daylight Time (UTC-4)

Date	Time	Round
Sunday, 21 July 1996		Round of 64; Round of 32; Round of 16; Quarterfinals; Semifinals; Bronze medal match Final

== Results ==
=== Section 1 ===
Round of 64
Jean-Marie Banos (CAN)	15
Tom Strzalkowski (USA)	11
Volodymyr Kaliuzhniy (UKR)	15
Elxan Məmmədov (AZE)	5
Antonio García (ESP)	15
Carlos Bravo (VEN)	11

Round of 32
Grigory Kiriyenko (RUS)	15
Jean-Marie Banos (CAN)	8
Florin Lupeică (ROU)	11
Rafal Sznajder (POL)	15
Damien Touya (FRA)	15
Volodymyr Kaliuzhniy (UKR)	11
Antonio García (ESP)	9
Jean-Philippe Daurelle (FRA)	15

Round of 16
Grigory Kiriyenko (RUS)	13
Rafal Sznajder (POL)	15
Damien Touya (FRA)	15
Jean-Philippe Daurelle (FRA)	7

Quarterfinals
Rafal Sznajder (POL)	12
Damien Touya (FRA)	15

=== Section 2 ===
Round of 64
James Williams (GBR)	15
Peter Westbrook (USA)	8
Jean-Paul Banos (CAN)	15
Archil Lortkipanidze (GEO)	13

Round of 32
Sergey Sharikov (RUS)	15
James Williams (GBR)	11
Vilmos Szabo (ROU)	15
Bence Szabó (HUN)	8
Csaba Köves (HUN)	10
Steffen Wiesinger (GER)	15
Jean-Paul Banos (CAN)	7
Tohni Terenzi (ITA)	15

Round of 16
Sergey Sharikov (RUS)	15
Vilmos Szabo (ROU)	8
Steffen Wiesinger (GER)	15
Tohni Terenzi (ITA)	8

Quarterfinals
Sergey Sharikov (RUS)	15
Steffen Wiesinger (GER)	6

=== Section 3 ===
Round of 64
Tony Plourde (CAN)	15
Yan Xiandong (CHN)	9
Janusz Olech (POL)	15
Bruno Cornet (PAR)	2
Peter Cox, Jr. (USA)	15
Lee Hyo-Geun (KOR)	9

Round of 32
József Navarrete (HUN)	15
Tony Plourde (CAN)	9
Frank Bleckmann (GER)	10
Norbert Jaskot (POL)	15
Franck Ducheix (FRA)	15
Janusz Olech (POL)	11
Peter Cox, Jr. (USA)	12
Felix Becker (GER)	15

Round of 16
József Navarrete (HUN)	15
Norbert Jaskot (POL)	8
Franck Ducheix (FRA)	8
Felix Becker (GER)	15

Quarterfinals
József Navarrete (HUN)	15
Felix Becker (GER)	7

=== Section 4 ===
Round of 64
Mihai Covaliu (ROU)	15
Raouf Salim Bernaoui (ALG)	7
Raúl Peinador (ESP)	15
Miguel Robles (BOL)	7
Yu Sang-Ju (KOR)	15
Seo Seong-Jun (KOR)	11

Round of 32
Luigi Tarantino (ITA)	w/o
Mihai Covaliu (ROU)
Raúl Peinador (ESP)	13
Vadym Huttsait (UKR)	15
Raffaelo Caserta (ITA)	9
Fernando Medina (ESP)	15
Yu Sang-Ju (KOR)	6
Stanislav Pozdnyakov (RUS)	15

Round of 16
Luigi Tarantino (ITA)	9
Vadym Huttsait (UKR)	15
Fernando Medina (ESP)	11
Stanislav Pozdnyakov (RUS)	15

Quarterfinals
Vadym Huttsait (UKR)	14
Stanislav Pozdnyakov (RUS)	15

=== Finals ===
Semifinals
Damien Touya (FRA)	14
Sergey Sharikov (RUS)	15
József Navarrete (HUN)	7
Stanislav Pozdnyakov (RUS)	15

Final
Sergey Sharikov (RUS)	12
Stanislav Pozdnyakov (RUS)	15
Bronze medal match
Damien Touya (FRA)	15
József Navarrete (HUN)	7

== Final classification ==
Rank	Fencer	Nation
1st place, gold medalist(s)	Stanislav Pozdnyakov	Russia
2nd place, silver medalist(s)	Sergey Sharikov	Russia
3rd place, bronze medalist(s)	Damien Touya	France
4	József Navarrete	Hungary
5	Felix Becker	Germany
6	Vadym Huttsait	Ukraine
7	Rafał Sznajder	Poland
8	Steffen Wiesinger	Germany
9	Grigory Kiriyenko	Russia
10	Tonhi Terenzi	Italy
11	Luigi Tarantino	Italy
12	Jean-Philippe Daurelle	France
13	Franck Ducheix	France
14	Norbert Jaskot	Poland
15	Fernando Medina	Spain
16	Vilmoș Szabo	Romania
17	Bence Szabó	Hungary
18	Csaba Köves	Hungary
19	Raffaelo Caserta	Italy
20	Florin Lupeică	Romania
21	Frank Bleckmann	Germany
22	Janusz Olech	Poland
23	Raúl Peinador	Spain
24	Volodymyr Kaliuzhniy	Ukraine
25	Mihai Covaliu	Romania
26	Antonio García	Spain
27	James Williams	Great Britain
28	Peter Cox, Jr.	United States
29	Jean-Paul Banos	Canada
30	Tony Plourde	Canada
31	Jean-Marie Banos	Canada
32	Yu Sang-Ju	South Korea
33	Seo Seong-Jun	South Korea
34	Tom Strzalkowski	United States
35	Yan Xiandong	China
36	Archil Lortkipanidze	Georgia
37	Peter Westbrook	United States
38	Lee Hyo-Geun	South Korea
39	Carlos Bravo	Venezuela
40	Elxan Məmmədov	Azerbaijan
41	Bruno Cornet	Paraguay
42	Miguel Robles	Bolivia
43	Raouf Salim Bernaoui	Algeria
