= Poland at the 1996 Summer Olympics =

- IOC code: POL
- NOC: Polish Olympic Committee
- Website: www.pkol.pl (in Polish)

in Atlanta, United States July 19, 1996 – August 4, 1996
- Competitors: 165 (126 men and 39 women) in 20 sports
- Flag bearer: Rafał Szukała
- Medals Ranked 11th: Gold 7 Silver 5 Bronze 5 Total 17

Summer Olympics appearances (overview)
- 1924; 1928; 1932; 1936; 1948; 1952; 1956; 1960; 1964; 1968; 1972; 1976; 1980; 1984; 1988; 1992; 1996; 2000; 2004; 2008; 2012; 2016; 2020; 2024

Other related appearances
- Russian Empire (1900, 1912); Austria (1908–1912)

Poland competed at the 1996 Summer Olympics in Atlanta, United States. 165 competitors, 126 men and 39 women, took part in 126 events in 20 sports.

== Medalists ==
=== Gold ===
- Robert Korzeniowski — Athletics, Men's 50 km Walk
- Paweł Nastula — Judo, Men's Half-Heavyweight (95 kg)
- Renata Mauer — Shooting, Women's Air Rifle
- Włodzimierz Zawadzki — Wrestling, Men's Greco-Roman Featherweight (62 kg)
- Ryszard Wolny — Wrestling, Men's Lightweight (68 kg)
- Andrzej Wroński — Wrestling, Men's Greco-Roman Heavyweight (100 kg)
- Mateusz Kusznierewicz — Sailing, Men's Finn Individual Competition

=== Silver ===
- Artur Partyka — Athletics, Men's High Jump
- Aneta Szczepanska — Judo, Women's Middleweight (66 kg)
- Piotr Kiełpikowski, Adam Krzesiński, and Ryszard Sobczak — Fencing, Men's Foil Team Competition
- Mirosław Rzepkowski — Shooting, Men's Skeet
- Jacek Fafiński — Wrestling, Men's Greco-Roman Light Heavyweight (90 kg)

=== Bronze ===
- Joanna Nowicka, Katarzyna Klata, and Iwona Dzięcioł — Archery, Women's Team Competition
- Piotr Markiewicz — Canoeing, Men's K1 500 m Kayak Singles
- Renata Mauer — Shooting, Women's Small-bore Rifle, Three Positions
- Andrzej Cofalik — Weightlifting, Men's Light Heavyweight (83 kg)
- Józef Tracz — Wrestling, Men's Greco-Roman Welterweight (74 kg)

== Archery ==
Poland entered three women and one man in its sixth appearance in Olympic archery. Veteran Joanna Nowicka had the best result of the individual round, while the women's team won the bronze medal.

Athlete	Event	Ranking round		Round of 64	Round of 32	Round of 16	Quarterfinals	Semifinals	Final / BM	
Athlete	Event	Score	Seed	Opposition Score	Opposition Score	Opposition Score	Opposition Score	Opposition Score	Opposition Score	Rank
Paweł Szymczak	Men's individual	653	30	Nuno Pombo (POR) (35); W 152-148	Oh Kyo-Moon (KOR) (3); L 154-169	Did not advance				29
Joanna Nowicka	Women's individual	651	12	Judi Adams (USA) (53); W 165-152	Lindsay Langston (USA) (21); W 152-152, 9-8	Olena Sadovnycha (UKR) (5); L 158-161	Did not advance			11
Katarzyna Klata	Women's individual	639	28	Khatouna Kurivichvili (GEO) (37); W 152-148	Olena Sadovnycha (UKR) (5); L 151-158	Did not advance				25
Iwona Dzięcioł	Women's individual	599	57	Kim Kyung-Wook (KOR) (8); L 158-164	Did not advance					33
Joanna Nowicka; Katarzyna Klata; Iwona Dzięcioł	Team	1889	12	—		Russia (5); W 233-229	Ukraine (4); W 242–235	South Korea (1); L 237–245	Turkey (2); W 244–239	Bronze medal

== Athletics ==
Key

- Note – Ranks given for track events are within the athlete's heat only
- Q = Qualified for the next round
- q = Qualified for the next round as a fastest loser or, in field events, by position without achieving the qualifying target
- NR = National record
- N/A = Round not applicable for the event
- Bye = Athlete not required to compete in round

Men
Track & road events

Athlete	Event	Heat		Quarterfinal		Semifinal		Final	
Athlete	Event	Result	Rank	Result	Rank	Result	Rank	Result	Rank
Leszek Bebło	Marathon	—						2:17.04	17
Grzegorz Gajdus	Marathon	—						2:23.41	61
Paweł Januszewski	400 m hurdles	49.63	3	Did not advance					
Robert Korzeniowski	20 km walk	—						1:21:13	8
Robert Korzeniowski	50 km walk	—						3:43.30	Gold medal
Robert Maćkowiak	200 m	20.67	2 Q	20.61	4	Did not advance			
Krzysztof Mehlich	110 m hurdles	13.81	2 Q	13.51	4 Q	13.55	5	Did not advance	
Piotr Rysiukiewicz	400 m	46.07	5 Q	46.19	8	Did not advance			
Piotr Rysiukiewicz; Piotr Haczek; Robert Maćkowiak; Tomasz Jędrusik; Paweł Januszewski	4 × 400 m relay	3:01.92	4 q	—				3:00.96	6

Field events

Athlete	Event	Qualification		Final	
Athlete	Event	Distance	Position	Distance	Position
Artur Partyka	High jump	2.28	1T Q	2.37	Silver medal
Jarosław Kotewicz	High jump	2.28	6T Q	2.25	11
Przemysław Radkiewicz	High jump	2.28	13T Q	2.29	10
Szymon Ziółkowski	Hammer throw	77.64	5 Q	76.64	10

Combined events – Decathlon

Athlete	Event	100	LJ	SP	HJ	400 m	110H	DT	PV	JT	1500 m	Final	Rank
Sebastian Chmara	Result	11.28	7.75	14.51	2.10	48.75	14.59	42.60	4.90	54.84	4:26.96	8249	15
Sebastian Chmara	Points	799	997	760	896	873	900	718	880	661	765	8249	15

Women
Track & road events

Athlete	Event	Heat		Quarterfinal		Semifinal		Final	
Athlete	Event	Result	Rank	Result	Rank	Result	Rank	Result	Rank
Anna Brzezińska	1500 m	4:11.06	7 q	—		4:07.17	7 q	4:08.27	12
Kamila Gradus	Marathon	—						dnf	
Aniela Nikiel	Marathon	—						2:36.44	29
Katarzyna Radtke	10 km walk	—						43:05	7
Małgorzata Rydz	1500 m	4:07.51	5 Q	—		4:10.77	4 Q	4:05.92	8
Małgorzata Sobańska	Marathon	—						2:31.52	11

Field events

Athlete	Event	Qualification		Final	
Athlete	Event	Distance	Position	Distance	Position
Agata Jaroszek-Karczmarek	Long jump	6.70	6T Q	6.90	6
Renata Katewicz	Discus throw	58.24	25	Did not advance	

Combined events – Heptathlon

Athlete	Event	100H	HJ	SP	200 m	LJ	JT	800 m	Final	Rank
Urszula Włodarczyk	Result	13.48	1.86	14.36	24.27	6.30	43.28	2:12.35	6484	4
Urszula Włodarczyk	Points	1053	1054	818	955	943	730	931	6484	4

== Badminton ==
Athlete	Event	Round of 64	Round of 32	Round of 16	Quarterfinal	Semifinal	Final / BM	
Athlete	Event	Opposition Score	Opposition Score	Opposition Score	Opposition Score	Opposition Score	Opposition Score	Rank
Katarzyna Krasowska	Women's singles	Amparo Lim (PHI); W 11–6, 11-5	PVV Lakshimi (IND); W 11–5, 11-6	Susi Susanti (INA); L 4–11, 0-11	Did not advance			

== Boxing ==
Men

Athlete	Event	Round of 32	Round of 16	Quarterfinals	Semifinals	Final	
Athlete	Event	Opposition Result	Opposition Result	Opposition Result	Opposition Result	Opposition Result	Rank
Jacek Bielski	Light welterweight	Luis Deines Pérez (PUR); W 18-2	Mohamed Alalou (ALG); L 8-19	Did not advance			9
Józef Gilewski	Light middleweight	Alfredo Duvergel (CUB); L 2-10	Did not advance				17
Tomasz Borowski	Middleweight	Mohamed Mosbahi (MAR); W 9-6	Hirokuni Moto (JPN); W 11-6	Malik Beyleroğlu (TUR); L 12-16	Did not advance		5
Wojciech Bartnik	Heavyweight	Lakha Singh (IND); W 14-2	Georgi Kandelaki (GEO); L 1-6	Did not advance			9

== Canoeing ==
=== Slalom ===
Athlete	Event	Final					
Athlete	Event	Run 1	Rank	Run 2	Rank	Total	Rank
Ryszard Mordarski	Men's C-1	161.00	7	161.86	5	161.00	8
Mariusz Wieczorek	Men's C-1	164.21	11	181.17	18	164.21	11
Jerzy Sandera	Men's K-1	172.78	29	155.79	18	155.79	27
Krzysztof Kołomański; Michał Staniszewski	Men's C-2	173.78	4	169.95	6	169.95	7
Andrzej Wójs; Sławomir Mordarski	Men's C-2	226.51	13	213.07	14	213.07	15
Agnieszka Stanuch	Women's K-1	200.20	12	209.45	18	200.20	21

=== Sprint ===
Men

Athlete	Event	Heats		Repechage		Semifinals		Final	
Athlete	Event	Time	Rank	Time	Rank	Time	Rank	Time	Rank
Piotr Markiewicz	K-1 500 m	1:42.731	2 QS	BYE		1:41.565	5 qF	1:38.615	Bronze medal
Andrzej Gajewski	K-1 1000 m	3:49.507	2 QS	BYE		3:43.399	4 QF	3:32.521	6
Paweł Baraszkiewicz; Marcin Kobierski	C-2 500 m	1:48.357	6 R	1:48.093	3 QS	1:44.793	8	Did not advance	15
Dariusz Koszykowski; Tomasz Goliasz	C-2 1000 m	4:22.181	6 R	3:48.721	5	Did not advance			13
Maciej Freimut; Adam Wysocki	K-2 500 m	1:32.463	2 QS	BYE		1:30.243	3 QF	1:29.937	5
Grzegorz Kotowski; Dariusz Białkowski	K-2 1000 m	3:37.986	2 QS	BYE		3:18.026	1 QF	3:11.262	4
Piotr Markiewicz; Grzegorz Kaleta; Marek Witkowski; Adam Wysocki	K-4 1000 m	3:10.625	2 QF	—				2:54.772	4

Women

Athlete	Event	Heats		Repechage		Semifinals		Final	
Athlete	Event	Time	Rank	Time	Rank	Time	Rank	Time	Rank
Aneta Konieczna	K-1 500 m	1:54.015	4 R	1:58.359	2 QS	1:53.255	4 QF	1:52.451	9
Izabella Dylewska-Światowiak; Elżbieta Urbańczyk	K-2 500 m	1:44.906	3 QS	BYE		1:45.190	3 QF	1:42.753	7

Qualification Legend: 'R = Qualify to repechage; QS = Qualify to semi-final; QF = Qualify directly to final

== Cycling ==
=== Road ===
Athlete	Event	Time	Rank
Dariusz Baranowski	Men's road race	DNF	
Dariusz Baranowski	Men's time trial	1:07:08	9
Tomasz Brożyna	Men's road race	04:56:52	94
Tomasz Brożyna	Men's time trial	1:09:48	22
Sławomir Chrzanowski	Men's road race	04:56:46	50
Zbigniew Spruch	Men's road race	04:55:24	9

=== Track ===
1000m time trial

Athlete	Event	Time	Rank
Grzegorz Krejner	Men's 1000m time trial	1:04.697	6

Individual Pursuit

Athlete	Event	Qualifying round		Quarter-finals		Semi-finals		Finals	
Athlete	Event	Time	Rank	Time	Rank	Time	Rank	Time	Rank
Robert Karśnicki	Men's Individual pursuit	4:35.193	12	Did not advance					

=== Mountain biking ===
Athlete	Event	Time	Rank
Sławomir Barul	Men's cross-country	2:53:56	36
Marek Galiński	Men's cross-country	2:45:54	29

== Equestrianism ==
=== Eventing ===
Athlete	Horse	Event	Dressage		Cross-country		Show jumping				Total	
Athlete	Horse	Event	Dressage		Cross-country		Qualifier		Final		Total	
Athlete	Horse	Event	Penalties	Rank	Penalties	Rank	Penalties	Rank	Penalties	Rank	Penalties	Rank
Piotr Piasecki	Lady Nałęczowianka	Individual	62,8	27	DQ		DNS		Did not advance			
Bogusław Jarecki; Rafał Chojnowski; Artur Społowicz; Bogusław Owczarek	Polisa; Viva 5 Hazard; Askar	Team	—								2197,95	16

== Fencing ==
Eleven fencers, seven men and four women, represented Poland in 1996.

Men

Athlete	Event	Round of 64	Round of 32	Round of 16	Quarterfinal	Semifinal	Final / BM	
Athlete	Event	Opposition Score	Opposition Score	Opposition Score	Opposition Score	Opposition Score	Opposition Score	Rank
Piotr Kiełpikowski	Individual foil	Hiroki Ichigatani (JPN); W 15–13	Stefano Cerioni (ITA); W 15–7	Wolfgang Wienand (GER); L 11–15	Did not advance			16
Adam Krzesiński	Individual foil	Nick Bravin (USA); W 15–14	Elvis Gregory (CUB); L 10–15	Did not advance				27
Ryszard Sobczak	Individual foil	Abdul Muhsen Ali (KUW); W 15–7	Marco Arpino (ITA); W 15-14	Alessandro Puccini (ITA); L 4–15	Did not advance			15
Adam Krzesiński; Piotr Kiełpikowski; Ryszard Sobczak; Jarosław Rodzewicz	Team foil	—		Venezuela; W 45–27	Germany; W 45–44	Austria; W 45–38	Russia; L 40–45	Silver medal
Norbert Jaskot	Individual sabre	BYE	Frank Bleckmann (GER); W 15–10	József Navarrete (HUN); L 8–15	Did not advance			14
Janusz Olech	Individual sabre	Bruno Cornet (PAR); W 15–2	Franck Ducheix (FRA); L 11–15	Did not advance				22
Rafał Sznajder	Individual sabre	BYE	Florin Lupeică (ROM); W 15–11	Grigory Kiriyenko (RUS); W 7–15	Damien Touya (FRA); L 12–15	Did not advance		7
Janusz Olech; Norbert Jaskot; Rafał Sznajder	Team sabre	—		South Korea; W 45–24	France; W 45–42	Hungary; L 33–45	Italy; L 37–45	4

Women

Athlete	Event	Round of 64	Round of 32	Round of 16	Quarterfinal	Semifinal	Final / BM	
Athlete	Event	Opposition Score	Opposition Score	Opposition Score	Opposition Score	Opposition Score	Opposition Score	Rank
Katarzyna Felusiak	Individual foil	Henda Zaouali (TUN); W 15-9	Monika Weber-Koszto (GER); L 14-15	Did not advance				28
Anna Rybicka	Individual foil	BYE	Aida Mohamed (HUN); L 8–15	Did not advance				22
Barbara Wolnicka-Szewczyk	Individual foil	Dolores Pampin (ARG); L 15-8	Zsuzsa Némethné Jánosi (HUN); L 11–15	Did not advance				25
Anna Rybicka; Barbara Wolnicka-Szewczyk; Katarzyna Felusiak	Team foil	—		United States; W 45–44	Germany; L 35-45	Classification semi-final Russia; L 44-45	7th place final China; L 32–45	8
Joanna Jakimiuk	Individual épée	Henda Zaouali (TUN); W 15-7	Viktoriya Titova (UKR); L 4–15	Did not advance				21

== Gymnastics ==
=== Rhythmic gymnastics ===
Athlete	Event	Qualification						Final					
Athlete	Event	Hoop	Ball	Clubs	Ribbon	Total	Rank	Hoop	Ball	Clubs	Ribbon	Total	Rank
Anna Kwitniewska	Individual	9.233	8.932	9.349	9.166	36.680	27	Did not advance					
Krystyna Leśkiewicz	Individual	9.250	9.232	9.250	9.250	36.982	21	Did not advance					

== Judo ==
Men

Athlete	Event	Preliminary	Round of 32	Round of 16	Quarterfinals	Semifinals	Repechage 1	Repechage 2	Repechage 3	Final / BM	
Athlete	Event	Opposition Result	Opposition Result	Opposition Result	Opposition Result	Opposition Result	Opposition Result	Opposition Result	Opposition Result	Opposition Result	Rank
Piotr Kamrowski	−60 kg	BYE	Zsolt Kunyik (HUN); W 1000-0000	Kim Jong-Won (KOR); L 0000-0100	Did not advance						17
Jarosław Lewak	−65 kg	—	José Tomás Toro (ESP); W 1000-0000	Julian Davies (GBR); W 0001-0000	Phillip Laats (BEL); L 0000-0010	Did not advance	BYE	Georgi Revazishvilli (GEO); L 0000-1000	Did not advance		9
Krzysztof Wojdan	−71 kg	BYE	Martin Schmidt (GER); W 0000–1000	Did not advance							21
Bronisław Wołkowicz	−78 kg	BYE	Gabor Szabo (HUN); W 1000-0000	Toshihiko Koga (JPN); L 0000-0100	Did not advance	Lo Yu-Wei (TPE); L 0000-1000	Did not advance				13
Marek Pisula	−86 kg	BYE	Ao Tegen (CHN); L 0000-1000	Did not advance							32
Paweł Nastula	−95 kg	—	Antal Kovács (HUN); W 1000-0000	Luigi Guido (ITA); W 1000-0000	Pedro Soares (POR); W 1000-0000	Aurelio Fernandez (BRA); W 0001-0000	Did not advance			Min-Soo Kim (KOR); W 1000-0000	Gold medal
Rafał Kubacki	+95 kg	—	Indrek Pertelson (EST); W 1000-0000	Ruslan Scharapov (BLR); W 0001-0000	Naoya Ogawa (JPN); L 0000-0001	Did not advance	BYE	Charalambos Papaioannou (GRE); L 0000-1000	Did not advance		9

Women

Athlete	Event	Round of 32	Round of 16	Quarterfinals	Semifinals	Repechage 1	Repechage 2	Repechage 3	Final / BM	
Athlete	Event	Opposition Result	Opposition Result	Opposition Result	Opposition Result	Opposition Result	Opposition Result	Opposition Result	Opposition Result	Rank
Małgorzata Roszkowska	−48 kg	BYE	Jana Perlberg (GER); W 0010–0000	Yolanda Soler (ESP); L 0000–0100	Did not advance	BYE	Joyce Heron (GBR); W 0100–0000	Sarah Nichilo (FRA); L 0000–1000	Did not advance	7
Larysa Krause	−52 kg	BYE	Lynda Mekzine (ALG); W 1000–0000	Almudena Muñoz (ESP); W 0001–0000	Marie-Claire Restoux (FRA); L 0000–0001	Did not advance	BYE	BYE	Noriko Sugawara (JPN); L 0000–1000	5
Beata Kucharzewska	−56 kg	BYE	Nicola Fairbrother (GBR); L 0000–0001	Did not advance						16
Aneta Szczepańska	−66 kg	BYE	Mélanie Engoang (GAB); W 1000–0000	Rowena Sweatman (GBR); W 1000–0000	Alice Dubois (FRA); W 1000–0000	BYE	BYE	BYE	Min-Sun Cho (KOR); L 0000–1000	Silver medal
Beata Maksymow	+72 kg	BYE	Christine Cicot (FRA); W 1000–0000	Heba Hefny (EGY); W 1000–0000	Estela Rodriguez Villanueva (CUB); L 0000–1000	Did not advance	BYE	BYE	Johanna Hagn (GER); L 0000–0010	5

== Modern pentathlon ==
Athlete	Event	Shooting (10 m air pistol)			Swimming (200 m freestyle)			Fencing (épée one touch)			Riding (show jumping)			Running (3000 m)			Total points	Final rank
Athlete	Event	Points	Rank	MP points	Time	Rank	MP points	Wins	Rank	MP points	Penalties	Rank	MP points	Time	Rank	MP points	Total points	Final rank
Maciej Czyżowicz	Men's	176	16T	1048	3:21.58	15	1260	12	25T	700	195	25	905	13:39.450	25	1108	5021	27
Igor Warabida	Men's	178	11T	1072	3:28.42	24	1208	15	18T	790	0	3	1100	12:41.577	5	1282	5452	5

== Rhythmic gymnastics ==
Athlete	Event	Qualification						Final					
Athlete	Event	Hoop	Ball	Clubs	Ribbon	Total	Rank	Hoop	Ball	Clubs	Ribbon	Total	Rank
Anna Kwitniewska	Individual	9.233	8.932	9.349	9.166	36.680	27	Did not advance					
Krystyna Leśkiewicz	Individual	9.250	9.232	9.250	9.250	36.982	21	Did not advance					

== Rowing ==
Men

Athlete	Event	Heats		Repechage		Semifinals		Final	
Athlete	Event	Time	Rank	Time	Rank	Time	Rank	Time	Rank
Kajetan Broniewski; Adam Korol	Coxless pair	6:48.13	2 R	6:53.21	3 FC	BYE		6:40.62	13
Jarosław Nowicki; Przemysław Lewandowski; Marek Kolbowicz; Piotr Bujnarowski	Quadruple sculls	6:52.62	5 R	5:51.15	1 SA/B	6:11.62	6 FB	5:55.10	9
Jacek Streich; Wojciech Jankowski; Piotr Olszewski; Piotr Basta	Coxless four	6:19.15	3 SA/B	BYE		6:16.65	4 FB	6:00.57	12
Robert Sycz; Grzegorz Wdowiak	Lightweight Double Sculls	6:54.68	3 R	6:24.19	2 SA/B	6:39.56	6 FB	6:24.95	7

== Sailing ==
Men

Athlete	Event	Race											Net points	Final rank
Athlete	Event	1	2	3	4	5	6	7	8	9	10	11	Net points	Final rank
Mirosław Małek	Mistral	8	14	6	~~47~~	8	7	11	~~47~~	17	—		71	11
Mateusz Kusznierewicz	Finn	~~10~~	4	~~20~~	4	9	1	2	1	1	10	—	32	Gold medal
Marek Chocian; Zdzislaw Staniul	470	~~37~~	18	~~22~~	19	17	7	21	13	8	5	17	125	16

Women

Athlete	Event	Race											Net points	Final rank
Athlete	Event	1	2	3	4	5	6	7	8	9	10	11	Net points	Final rank
Dorota Staszewska	Mistral	6	4	8	~~12~~	~~13~~	3	9	3	5	—		38	6
Weronika Glinkiewicz	Europe	11	11	16	~~29~~	20	~~24~~	20	13	14	14	19	138	20

M = Medal race; EL = Eliminated – did not advance into the medal race; CAN = Race cancelled

== Shooting ==
Men

Athlete	Event	Qualification		Final	
Athlete	Event	Score	Rank	Score	Rank
Tadeusz Czerwiński	50 m rifle prone	594	20	Did not advance	
Tadeusz Czerwiński	50 m rifle three positions	1157	32	Did not advance	
Robert Kraskowski	10 m air rifle	583	30	Did not advance	
Robert Kraskowski	50 m rifle prone	595	11	Did not advance	
Robert Kraskowski	50 m rifle three positions	1162	22	Did not advance	
Krzysztof Kucharczyk	25 m rapid fire pistol	589	3 Q	690.5	4
Marek Nowak	10 m air pistol	574	29	Did not advance	
Marek Nowak	50 m pistol	560	11	Did not advance	
Jerzy Pietrzak	10 m air pistol	585	2 Q	682.7	5
Jerzy Pietrzak	50 m pistol	563	9	Did not advance	
Mirosław Rzepkowski	Skeet	123	3 Q	148	Silver medal
Tadeusz Szamrej	Skeet	116	38	Did not advance	

Women

Athlete	Event	Qualification		Final	
Athlete	Event	Score	Rank	Score	Rank
Małgorzata Książkiewicz	50 m rifle three positions	563	41	Did not advance	
Małgorzata Książkiewicz	10 m air rifle	384	15	Did not advance	
Julita Macur	25 m pistol	580	6 Q	677.4	8
Julita Macur	10 m air pistol	375	27	Did not advance	
Renata Mauer	50 m rifle three positions	589 OR	1 Q	679.8	Bronze medal
Renata Mauer	10 m air rifle	395	2 Q	479.6	Gold medal

== Swimming ==
Men

Athlete	Event	Heat		Final B		Final	
Athlete	Event	Time	Rank	Time	Rank	Time	Rank
Konrad Gałka	200 metre butterfly	1:59.97	11 Q	2:00.91	14	Did not advance	
Bartosz Kizierowski	50 metre freestyle	23.34	28	Did not advance			
Bartosz Kizierowski	100 metre freestyle	50.18	13 Q	50.51	16	Did not advance	
Marek Krawczyk	100 metre breaststroke	1:03.57	25	Did not advance			
Marek Krawczyk	200 metre breaststroke	2:15.17	7 Q	—		2:14.84	6
Marcin Maliński	200 metre individual medley	2:05.42	17	Did not advance			
Marcin Maliński	400 metre individual medley	4:18.34	4 Q	—		4:20.50	7
Mariusz Siembida	100 m backstroke	56.16	11 Q	56.13	12	Did not advance	
Bartosz Sikora	200 m backstroke	2:00.99	7 Q	—		2:00.05	4
Rafał Szukała	100 m butterfly	53.41	5 Q	—		53.29	5
Mariusz Siembida; Marek Krawczyk; Rafał Szukała; Bartosz Kizierowski	4 × 100 m medley relay	3:41.72	6 Q	—		3:41.94	7

Women

Athlete	Event	Heat		Final B		Final	
Athlete	Event	Time	Rank	Time	Rank	Time	Rank
Izabela Burczyk	200 metre backstroke	2:16.91	19	Did not advance			
Alicja Pęczak	100 metre breaststroke	1:10.70	16 Q	1:10.44	14	Did not advance	
Alicja Pęczak	200 metre breaststroke	2:30.64	10	2:30.99	15	Did not advance	
Alicja Pęczak	200 metre individual medley	2:17.48	13 Q	2:18.21	15	Did not advance	
Anna Uryniuk	100 metre butterfly	1:02.39	21	Did not advance			
Anna Uryniuk	200 metre butterfly	2:13.90	14	2:13.64	13	Did not advance	

== Table tennis ==
Singles

Athlete	Event	Group round		Round of 16	Quarterfinals	Semifinals	Bronze medal	Final	
Athlete	Event	Opposition Result	Rank	Opposition Result	Opposition Result	Opposition Result	Opposition Result	Opposition Result	Rank
Andrzej Grubba	Men's singles	Group O Koji Matsushita (JPN); L 1 – 2 Anton Suseno (INA); W 2 – 0 Gideon Joseph Ng (CAN); W 2 – 0	2	Did not advance					

Doubles

Athlete	Event	Group round		Quarterfinals	Semifinals	Bronze medal	Final	
Athlete	Event	Opposition Result	Rank	Opposition Result	Opposition Result	Opposition Result	Opposition Result	Rank
Andrzej Grubba; Lucjan Błaszczyk	Men's doubles	Group F Kang Hee-Chan; Kim Taek-Soo (KOR); L 0 – 2 Chang Peng-Iung; Wu Wen-Chia (TPE); W 2 – 1	2	Did not advance				

== Tennis ==
Women

Athlete	Event	Round of 64	Round of 32	Round of 16	Quarterfinals	Semifinals	Final	
Athlete	Event	Opposition Score	Opposition Score	Opposition Score	Opposition Score	Opposition Score	Opposition Score	Rank
Magdalena Grzybowska	Singles	Virginia Ruano-Pascual (ESP); L 4–6, 2–6	Did not advance					
Aleksandra Olsza	Singles	Virag Csurgo (HUN); L 2–6, 5–7	Did not advance					

== Volleyball ==
=== Pool A ===
Pos	Team	Pld	W	L	Pts	SW	SL	SR	SPW	SPL	SPR	Qualification
1	Cuba	5	4	1	9	12	5	2.400	233	191	1.220	Quarterfinals
2	Brazil	5	3	2	8	10	6	1.667	210	187	1.123	Quarterfinals
3	Bulgaria	5	3	2	8	10	8	1.250	225	212	1.061	Quarterfinals
4	Argentina	5	3	2	8	9	9	1.000	222	225	0.987	Quarterfinals
5	United States	5	2	3	7	10	9	1.111	241	233	1.034	
6	Poland	5	0	5	5	1	15	0.067	151	234	0.645	

Date		Score		Set 1	Set 2	Set 3	Set 4	Set 5	Total
21 Jul	United States	3–0	Poland	15–13	15–6	15–8			45–27
23 Jul	Cuba	3–0	Poland	15–13	15–2	15–13			45–28
25 Jul	Brazil	3–0	Poland	15–7	15–11	15–8			45–26
27 Jul	Bulgaria	3–0	Poland	15–4	15–10	15–7			45–21
29 Jul	Argentina	3–1	Poland	7–15	17–15	15–10	15–9		54–49

Team roster
- Damian Dacewicz
- Piotr Gruszka
- Krzysztof Jańczak
- Marcin Nowak
- Robert Prygiel
- Witold Roman (captain)
- Krzysztof Śmigiel
- Andrzej Stelmach
- Krzysztof Stelmach
- Mariusz Szyszko
- Leszek Urbanowicz
- Paweł Zagumny

== Weightlifting ==
Men

Athlete	Event	Snatch		Clean & jerk		Total	Rank
Athlete	Event	Result	Rank	Result	Rank	Total	Rank
Marek Gorzelniak	−54 kg	107,5	12	137,5	12	245.0	13
Wojciech Natusiewicz	−64 kg	122,5	24	160.0	14	282,5	21
Andrzej Cofalik	−83 kg	170.0	4	202.5	3	372.5	Bronze medal
Marek Maślany	−91 kg	165.0	15	205.0	10	370.0	11
Dariusz Osuch	−108 kg	177.5	8	215.0	8	392.5	8

== Wrestling ==
Men's freestyle

Athlete	Event	Round 1	Round 2	Round 3	Round 4	Round 5	Round 6	Final / BM	
Athlete	Event	Opposition Result	Opposition Result	Opposition Result	Opposition Result	Opposition Result	Opposition Result	Opposition Result	Rank
Jan Krzesiak	−62 kg	Enrique Cubas (PER); L 7–7	Şerban Mumjiev (ROM); L 1–12	Did not advance					17
Robert Kostecki	−90 kg	Dzhambolat Tedeyev (UKR); L 4–5	Scott Bianco (CAN); L 2–3	Did not advance					17
Marek Garmulewicz	−100 kg	Ben Vincent (AUS); W 11–0	Oleg Ladik (CAN); W 3-0	BYE	Abbas Jadidi (IRI); L 1-4	Did not advance	Sergey Kovalevsky (BLR); L 0-4	Konstantin Aleksandrov (KGZ); W WO	5

Men's Greco-Roman

Athlete	Event	Round 1	Round 2	Round 3	Round 4	Round 5	Round 6	Final / BM	
Athlete	Event	Opposition Result	Opposition Result	Opposition Result	Opposition Result	Opposition Result	Opposition Result	Opposition Result	Rank
Piotr Jabłoński	−48 kg	Kang Yong-Gyun (PRK); L 3–9	BYE	Hiroshi Kado (JPN); L 1–9	Did not advance				15
Dariusz Jabłoński	−52 kg	Valentin Rebegea (ROM); W 6–0	Samvel Danielyan (RUS); L 0–8	Ulises Valentin (DOM); W 3-0	Ha Tae-Yeon (KOR); W 3-2	Andriy Kalashnykov (UKR); L 5–8	Did not advance	Ha Tae-Yeon (KOR); L 2-3	8
Stanisław Pawłowski	−57 kg	Aigars Jansons (LAT); L 3–4	Vilayet Aghayev (AZE); L 3-4	Did not advance					16
Włodzimierz Zawadzki	−62 kg	Igor Petrenko (BLR); W 4-3	Usama Aziz (SWE); W 3-1	Koba Guliashvili (GEO); W 3-1	Hryhoriy Komyshenko (UKR); W 8-2	BYE		Juan Marén (CUB); W 3-1	Gold medal
Ryszard Wolny	−68 kg	Attila Repka (HUN); W 6–1	BYE	Liubal Colás (CUB); W 6-0	Grigori Pulyaev (UZB); W 3–0	BYE		Ghani Yalouz (FRA); W 7-0	Gold medal
Józef Tracz	−74 kg	Tamás Berzicza (HUN); L 0-1	Aziz Khalfi (MAR); W 9-2	Bakhtiyar Baiseitov (KAZ); W 2-1	Torbjörn Kornbakk (SWE); W 6-0	Stoyan Stoyanov (BUL); W 4-2	Artur Dzyhasov (UKR); W 3-1	Erik Hahn (GER); W 4-2	Bronze medal
Jacek Fafiński	−90 kg	Abdelaziz Essafoui (MAR); W 4-0	Rozy Rejepov (TKM); W 12-2	BYE	Iordanis Konstantinidis (GRE); W 6-0	BYE		Vyacheslav Oliynyk (UKR); W 6-0	Silver medal
Andrzej Wroński	−100 kg	Mohamed Naouar (TUN); W 10-0	Igor Grabovetchi (MDA); W 0-0	BYE	Héctor Milián (CUB); W 1-0	BYE		Sergey Lishtvan (BLR); W 0-0	Gold medal

== Notes ==
- Watkins, Ginger T., ed. (1997). The Official Report of the Centennial Olympic Games, Volume III The Competition Results (PDF). Atlanta: Peachtree Publishers. ISBN 1-56145-150-9.
