= Fencing at the 2000 Summer Olympics – Men's team sabre =

Men's team sabre at the Games of the XXVII Olympiad
- Venue: Sydney Exhibition Centre
- Dates: 24 September 2000
- Competitors: 29 from 9 nations

Medalists
1st place, gold medalist(s)		Sergey Sharikov; Stanislav Pozdnyakov; Aleksey Frosin	Russia
2nd place, silver medalist(s)		Mathieu Gourdain; Damien Touya; Julien Pillet; Cédric Séguin	France
3rd place, bronze medalist(s)		Dennis Bauer; Alexander Weber; Wiradech Kothny	Germany

The men's team sabre was one of ten fencing events on the fencing at the 2000 Summer Olympics programme. It was the twenty-first appearance of the event. The competition was held on 24 September 2000. 29 fencers from 9 nations competed.

== Main tournament bracket ==
The field of 9 teams competed in a single-elimination tournament to determine the medal winners. Semifinal losers proceeded to a bronze medal match. Matches were also conducted to determine the final team placements.

Round of 16
Romania; Mihai Covaliu; Florin Lupeică; Victor Găureanu	-
Bye	-
Poland; Rafał Sznajder; Norbert Jaskot; Marcin Sobala	45
Spain; Jorge Pina; Antonio García; Fernando Medina	33
Hungary; Zsolt Nemcsik; Csaba Köves; Domonkos Ferjancsik; Péter Takács	-
Bye	-
Bye	-
Russia; Sergey Sharikov; Stanislav Pozdnyakov; Aleksey Frosin	-
Germany; Dennis Bauer; Alexander Weber; Wiradech Kothny	-
Bye	-
Bye	-
Italy; Tonhi Terenzi; Luigi Tarantino; Raffaelo Caserta; Gianpiero Pastore	-
Ukraine; Vadym Huttsait; Volodymyr Lukashenko; Volodymyr Kaliuzhniy	-
Bye	-
Bye	-
France; Mathieu Gourdain; Damien Touya; Julien Pillet; Cédric Séguin	-

Quarterfinals
Romania; Mihai Covaliu; Florin Lupeică; Victor Găureanu	45
Poland; Rafał Sznajder; Norbert Jaskot; Marcin Sobala	26
Hungary; Zsolt Nemcsik; Csaba Köves; Domonkos Ferjancsik	39
Russia; Sergey Sharikov; Stanislav Pozdnyakov; Aleksey Frosin	45
Germany; Dennis Bauer; Alexander Weber; Wiradech Kothny	45
Italy; Tonhi Terenzi; Luigi Tarantino; Raffaelo Caserta	42
Ukraine; Vadym Huttsait; Volodymyr Lukashenko; Volodymyr Kaliuzhniy	31
France; Mathieu Gourdain; Damien Touya; Julien Pillet	45

Semifinals
Romania; Mihai Covaliu; Florin Lupeică; Victor Găureanu	28
Russia; Sergey Sharikov; Stanislav Pozdnyakov; Aleksey Frosin	45
Germany; Dennis Bauer; Alexander Weber; Wiradech Kothny	44
France; Mathieu Gourdain; Damien Touya; Julien Pillet	45

Gold medal final
Russia; Sergey Sharikov; Stanislav Pozdnyakov; Aleksey Frosin	45
France; Mathieu Gourdain; Damien Touya; Julien Pillet	32
Bronze medal final
Germany; Dennis Bauer; Alexander Weber; Wiradech Kothny	45
Romania; Mihai Covaliu; Florin Lupeică; Victor Găureanu	27

== Classification 5-8 ==
Placement 5-6
Poland; Rafał Sznajder; Norbert Jaskot; Marcin Sobala	41
Hungary; Zsolt Nemcsik; Domonkos Ferjancsik; Péter Takács	45
Italy; Luigi Tarantino; Raffaelo Caserta; Gianpiero Pastore	29
Ukraine; Vadym Huttsait; Volodymyr Lukashenko; Volodymyr Kaliuzhniy	45

Fifth place match
Hungary; Zsolt Nemcsik; Domonkos Ferjancsik; Péter Takács	45
Ukraine; Vadym Huttsait; Volodymyr Lukashenko; Volodymyr Kaliuzhniy	43
Third place
Poland; Rafał Sznajder; Norbert Jaskot; Marcin Sobala	45
Italy; Luigi Tarantino; Raffaelo Caserta; Gianpiero Pastore	39

== Classification 9-11 ==
Placement 9-11
Spain; Jorge Pina; Antonio García; Fernando Medina	Bye
-	-
-
-

Ninth place match
-
-
Spain; Jorge Pina; Antonio García; Fernando Medina	Bye
Third place
-	-
-
