= Fencing at the 1996 Summer Olympics – Men's team sabre =

Men's team sabre at the Games of the XXVI Olympiad
- Venue: Georgia World Congress Center
- Dates: July 24, 1996
- Competitors: 33 from 11 nations

Medalists
1st place, gold medalist(s)		Grigory Kiriyenko; Sergey Sharikov; Stanislav Pozdnyakov	Russia
2nd place, silver medalist(s)		Bence Szabó; Csaba Köves; József Navarrete	Hungary
3rd place, bronze medalist(s)		Luigi Tarantino; Raffaelo Caserta; Tonhi Terenzi	Italy

The men's team sabre was one of ten fencing events on the fencing at the 1996 Summer Olympics programme. It was the twentieth appearance of the event. The competition was held on July 24, 1996. 33 fencers from 11 nations competed.

== Brackets ==
1/16
08:30
Russia
bye
08:30
Spain	45
Canada	25
08:30
Italy
bye
08:30
Germany
bye
08:30
France
bye
08:30
Poland	45
South Korea	24
08:30
Hungary
bye
08:30
Romania	45
United States	40

Quarterfinals
10:00
Russia	45
Spain	34
10:00
Italy	45
Germany	42
10:00
France	42
Poland	45
10:00
Hungary	45
Romania	40

Semifinals
11:25
Russia	45
Italy	28
11:25
Poland	33
Hungary	45

Gold medal final
19:50
Russia	45
Hungary	25
Bronze medal final
18:30
Poland	37
Italy	45

== Rosters ==
Canada - 10th place

- Jean-Marie Banos
- Jean-Paul Banos
- Tony Plourde

France - 5th place

- Damien Touya
- Franck Ducheix
- Jean-Philippe Daurelle

Germany - 8th place

- Felix Becker
- Frank Bleckmann
- Steffen Wiesinger

Hungary

- Bence Szabó
- Csaba Köves
- József Navarrete

Italy

- Luigi Tarantino
- Raffaelo Caserta
- Tonhi Terenzi

Poland - 4th place

- Janusz Olech
- Norbert Jaskot
- Rafał Sznajder

Romania - 7th place

- Florin Lupeică
- Mihai Covaliu
- Vilmoș Szabo

Russia

- Grigory Kiriyenko
- Sergey Sharikov
- Stanislav Pozdnyakov

South Korea - 11th place

- Lee Hyo-Geun
- Seo Seong-Jun
- Yu Sang-Ju

Spain - 6th place

- Antonio García
- Fernando Medina
- Raúl Peinador

United States - 9th place

- Peter Cox, Jr.
- Peter Westbrook
- Tom Strzalkowski
