= Fencing at the 2002 Asian Games – Men's team sabre =

Men's team sabre at the 2002 Asian Games
- Venue: Gangseo Gymnasium
- Date: 4 October 2002
- Competitors: 32 from 8 nations

Medalists
gold medal	South Korea; Kim Doo-hong, Lee Hyuk, Lee Seung-won, Seo Sung-jun
silver medal	China; Chen Feng, Wang Jingzhi, Zhao Chunsheng, Zhou Hanming
bronze medal	Kazakhstan; Yevgeniy Frolov, Sergey Sleptsov, Sergey Smirnov, Igor Tsel

The men's team sabre competition at the 2002 Asian Games in Busan, South Korea was held on 4 October 2002 at the Gangseo Gymnasium.

== Schedule ==
All times are Korea Standard Time (UTC+09:00)

Date	Time	Event
Friday, 4 October 2002	10:00	Quarterfinals
Friday, 4 October 2002	10:00	Semifinals
Friday, 4 October 2002	10:00	Classification
Friday, 4 October 2002	18:00	Finals

== Results ==
Legend

- WO — Won by walkover

Quarterfinals
1	South Korea	WO
8	Kuwait
5	Philippines	24
4	Kazakhstan	45
3	Thailand	34
6	Japan	45
7	Saudi Arabia	30
2	China	45

Semifinals
1	South Korea	45
4	Kazakhstan	36
6	Japan	32
2	China	45

Final
1	South Korea	45
2	China	40
3rd–4th place
4	Kazakhstan	45
6	Japan	42

5th~8th place
8	Kuwait
5	Philippines	WO
3	Thailand	45
7	Saudi Arabia	32

5th–6th place
5	Philippines	41
3	Thailand	45
7th–8th place
8	Kuwait
7	Saudi Arabia	WO

== Final standing ==
Rank	Team
1st place, gold medalist(s)	South Korea (KOR); Kim Doo-hong; Lee Hyuk; Lee Seung-won; Seo Sung-jun
2nd place, silver medalist(s)	China (CHN); Chen Feng; Wang Jingzhi; Zhao Chunsheng; Zhou Hanming
3rd place, bronze medalist(s)	Kazakhstan (KAZ); Yevgeniy Frolov; Sergey Sleptsov; Sergey Smirnov; Igor Tsel
4	Japan (JPN); Yusuke Fukuda; Hidenori Munekata; Masashi Nagara; Takashi Okano
5	Thailand (THA); Wiradech Kothny; Nontapat Panchan; Somkhit Phongyoo; Sares Limkangwanmongkol
6	Philippines (PHI); Edward Daliva; Walbert Mendoza; Emerson Segui; Edmon Velez
7	Saudi Arabia (KSA); Fahad Al-Balwi; Mansour Al-Hamad; Majed Al-Muwallad; Khalid Al-Temawi
8	Kuwait (KUW); Abdulkarim Al-Shamlan; Tareq Faisal; Hasan Malallah; Abdulmohsen Shahrayen
