= Fencing at the 2002 Asian Games – Men's individual sabre =

Men's individual sabre at the 2002 Asian Games
- Venue: Gangseo Gymnasium
- Date: 1 October 2002
- Competitors: 16 from 8 nations

Medalists
gold medal	Lee Seung-won	South Korea
silver medal	Wang Jingzhi	China
bronze medal	Kim Doo-hong	South Korea

The men's individual sabre competition at the 2002 Asian Games in Busan was held on 1 October at the Gangseo Gymnasium.

== Schedule ==
All times are Korea Standard Time (UTC+09:00)

Date	Time	Event
Tuesday, 1 October 2002	10:00	Preliminary pool
Tuesday, 1 October 2002	12:00	1/8 elimination
Tuesday, 1 October 2002	12:00	Quarterfinals
Tuesday, 1 October 2002	12:00	Semifinals
Tuesday, 1 October 2002	19:00	Finals

== Results ==
=== Preliminary pool ===
Rank	Pool	Athlete	W	L	W/M	TD	TF
1	3	Wang Jingzhi (CHN)	4	0	1.000	+12	20
2	1	Kim Doo-hong (KOR)	5	0	1.000	+10	25
3	2	Lee Seung-won (KOR)	4	0	1.000	+9	20
4	1	Hidenori Munekata (JPN)	4	1	0.800	+4	22
5	3	Masashi Nagara (JPN)	3	1	0.750	+6	18
6	2	Walbert Mendoza (PHI)	3	1	0.750	+5	19
7	1	Wiradech Kothny (THA)	3	2	0.600	+9	23
8	2	Zhao Chunsheng (CHN)	2	2	0.500	+1	16
9	3	Igor Tsel (KAZ)	2	2	0.500	+1	14
10	1	Abdulkarim Al-Shamlan (KUW)	2	3	0.400	−9	14
11	2	Majed Al-Muwallad (KSA)	1	3	0.250	−7	12
12	3	Tareq Faisal (KUW)	1	3	0.250	−9	9
13	1	Sergey Smirnov (KAZ)	1	4	0.200	−6	18
14	1	Fahad Al-Balwi (KSA)	0	5	0.000	−8	17
15	2	Sares Limkangwanmongkol (THA)	0	4	0.000	−8	12
16	3	Edmon Velez (PHI)	0	4	0.000	−10	10

=== Knockout round ===
1/8 elimination
9	Igor Tsel (KAZ)	9
8	Zhao Chunsheng (CHN)	15
5	Masashi Nagara (JPN)	15
12	Tareq Faisal (KUW)	3
13	Sergey Smirnov (KAZ)	15
4	Hidenori Munekata (JPN)	12
11	Majed Al-Muwallad (KSA)	12
6	Walbert Mendoza (PHI)	15
7	Wiradech Kothny (THA)	15
10	Abdulkarim Al-Shamlan (KUW)	6

Quarterfinals
1	Wang Jingzhi (CHN)	15
8	Zhao Chunsheng (CHN)	12
5	Masashi Nagara (JPN)	11
13	Sergey Smirnov (KAZ)	15
3	Lee Seung-won (KOR)	15
6	Walbert Mendoza (PHI)	10
7	Wiradech Kothny (THA)	13
2	Kim Doo-hong (KOR)	15

Semifinals
1	Wang Jingzhi (CHN)	15
13	Sergey Smirnov (KAZ)	14
3	Lee Seung-won (KOR)	15
2	Kim Doo-hong (KOR)	8

Final
1	Wang Jingzhi (CHN)	8
3	Lee Seung-won (KOR)	15
3rd–4th place
13	Sergey Smirnov (KAZ)	14
2	Kim Doo-hong (KOR)	15

== Final standing ==
Rank	Athlete
1st place, gold medalist(s)	Lee Seung-won (KOR)
2nd place, silver medalist(s)	Wang Jingzhi (CHN)
3rd place, bronze medalist(s)	Kim Doo-hong (KOR)
4	Sergey Smirnov (KAZ)
5	Masashi Nagara (JPN)
6	Walbert Mendoza (PHI)
7	Wiradech Kothny (THA)
8	Zhao Chunsheng (CHN)
9	Hidenori Munekata (JPN)
10	Igor Tsel (KAZ)
11	Abdulkarim Al-Shamlan (KUW)
12	Majed Al-Muwallad (KSA)
13	Tareq Faisal (KUW)
14	Fahad Al-Balwi (KSA)
15	Sares Limkangwanmongkol (THA)
16	Edmon Velez (PHI)
