= Fencing at the 2006 Asian Games – Men's team sabre =

Men's team sabre at the 2006 Asian Games
- Venue: Al-Arabi Indoor Hall
- Date: 13 December 2006
- Competitors: 36 from 10 nations

Medalists
gold medal	China; Huang Yaojiang, Wang Jingzhi, Zhou Hanming, Zhu Jun
silver medal	South Korea; Lee Hyuk, Oh Eun-seok, Oh Seung-hwan, Won Woo-young
bronze medal	Thailand; Natee Kattancharoen, Ekkathet Ketiam, Wiradech Kothny, Sares Limkangwanmongkol
bronze medal	Japan; Masashi Nagara, Tatsuro Watanabe, Koji Yamamoto

The men's team sabre competition at the 2006 Asian Games in Doha was held on 13 December at the Al-Arabi Indoor Hall.

== Schedule ==
All times are Arabia Standard Time (UTC+03:00)

Date	Time	Event
Wednesday, 13 December 2006	09:00	Round of 16
Wednesday, 13 December 2006	10:10	Quarterfinals
Wednesday, 13 December 2006	11:20	Semifinals
Wednesday, 13 December 2006	18:00	Gold medal match

== Seeding ==
The teams were seeded taking into account the results achieved by competitors representing each team in the individual event.

Rank	Team	Fencer		Total
Rank	Team	1	2	Total
1	China (CHN)	1	3	4
2	South Korea (KOR)	2	11	13
3	Japan (JPN)	5	13	18
4	Thailand (THA)	3	16	19
5	Hong Kong (HKG)	8	12	20
6	Kuwait (KUW)	7	15	22
7	Kazakhstan (KAZ)	10	14	24
8	Iran (IRI)	6	—	26
9	Philippines (PHI)	9	18	27
10	Qatar (QAT)	17	19	36

== Results ==
Round of 16
9	Philippines	28
8	Iran	45
7	Kazakhstan	45
10	Qatar	20

Quarterfinals
1	China	45
8	Iran	39
5	Hong Kong	44
4	Thailand	45
3	Japan	45
6	Kuwait	31
7	Kazakhstan	23
2	South Korea	45

Semifinals
1	China	45
4	Thailand	18
3	Japan	38
2	South Korea	45

Gold medal match
1	China	45
2	South Korea	44

== Final standing ==
Rank	Team
1st place, gold medalist(s)	China (CHN); Huang Yaojiang; Wang Jingzhi; Zhou Hanming; Zhu Jun
2nd place, silver medalist(s)	South Korea (KOR); Lee Hyuk; Oh Eun-seok; Oh Seung-hwan; Won Woo-young
3rd place, bronze medalist(s)	Thailand (THA); Natee Kattancharoen; Ekkathet Ketiam; Wiradech Kothny; Sares Limkangwanmongkol
3rd place, bronze medalist(s)	Japan (JPN); Masashi Nagara; Tatsuro Watanabe; Koji Yamamoto
5	Hong Kong (HKG); Lam Hin Chung; Tse Yu Ming; Yuen Hou In
6	Kuwait (KUW); Ahmad Abdulkhedhr; Abdullah Al-Khaiyat; Mohammad Kazem; Sulaiman Thunayan
7	Kazakhstan (KAZ); Yevgeniy Frolov; Yerali Tilenshiyev; Igor Tsel; Zhanserik Turlybekov
8	Iran (IRI); Parviz Darvishi; Peyman Fakhri; Hamid Reza Taherkhani
9	Philippines (PHI); Edward Daliva; Walbert Mendoza; Gian Carlo Nocom
10	Qatar (QAT); Nasr Al-Saadi; Dawood Al-Shukaili; Ahmed Al-Siddiq; Yahya Qasim
