= Jacek Fafiński =

Polish wrestler (born 1970)

Medal record

Men's Greco-Roman wrestling

Representing Poland

Olympic Games
Silver medal – second place	1996 Atlanta	90 kg

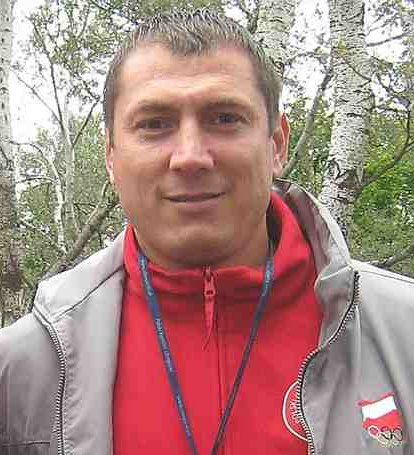
Jacek Fafiński

Jacek Fafiński (born 21 October 1970 in Lubawa) is a Polish wrestler. Fafiński won the silver medal at the 1996 Summer Olympics in Atlanta in the 90 kg Greco-Roman division. Fafinski went 3–0 in the 90 kg Greco-Roman division, defeating Abdelaziz Essafoui of Morocco, Rozy Redzhepov of Turkmenistan, and Iordanis Konstantinidis of Greece before losing to Vyacheslav Oleynyk of Ukraine in the gold medal match.

For his sport achievements, he received:
Golden Cross of Merit in 1996.
