= Fencing at the 2006 Asian Games – Men's individual sabre =

Men's individual sabre at the 2006 Asian Games
- Venue: Al-Arabi Indoor Hall
- Date: 10 December 2006
- Competitors: 20 from 10 nations

Medalists
gold medal	Wang Jingzhi	China
silver medal	Oh Eun-seok	South Korea
bronze medal	Wiradech Kothny	Thailand
bronze medal	Zhou Hanming	China

The men's individual sabre competition at the 2006 Asian Games in Doha was held on 10 December at the Al-Arabi Indoor Hall.

== Schedule ==
All times are Arabia Standard Time (UTC+03:00)

Date	Time	Event
Sunday, 10 December 2006	09:00	Round of pools
Sunday, 10 December 2006	10:30	Round of 16
Sunday, 10 December 2006	11:15	Quarterfinals
Sunday, 10 December 2006	18:00	Semifinals
Sunday, 10 December 2006	19:10	Gold medal match

== Results ==
Legend

- D — Disqualified

=== Round of pools ===
==== Pool 1 ====
Athlete	KOR	JPN	KAZ	IRI	KUW	THA	PHI
Oh Eun-seok (KOR)	—	5–1	5–3	5–3	5–2	5–1	5–2
Masashi Nagara (JPN)	1–5	—	5–4	2–5	5–3	5–1	5–0
Yevgeniy Frolov (KAZ)	3–5	4–5	—	5–1	4–5	5–3	5–2
Peyman Fakhri (IRI)	3–5	5–2	1–5	—	5–4	5–2	5–2
Mohammad Kazem (KUW)	2–5	3–5	5–4	4–5	—	5–3	5–2
Ekkathet Ketiam (THA)	1–5	1–5	3–5	2–5	3–5	—	5–3
Gian Carlo Nocom (PHI)	2–5	0–5	2–5	2–5	2–5	3–5	—

==== Pool 2 ====
Athlete	CHN	THA	KAZ	HKG	KUW	PHI	QAT
Wang Jingzhi (CHN)	—	5–2	5–2	5–1	5–4	5–3	5–1
Wiradech Kothny (THA)	2–5	—	5–2	5–2	5–2	5–4	5–1
Yerali Tilenshiyev (KAZ)	2–5	2–5	—	1–5	5–4	1–5	5–3
Yuen Hou In (HKG)	1–5	2–5	5–1	—	5–2	5–3	5–1
Ahmad Abdulkhedhr (KUW)	4–5	2–5	4–5	2–5	—	2–5	5–2
Walbert Mendoza (PHI)	3–5	4–5	5–1	3–5	5–2	—	5–0
Ahmed Al-Siddiq (QAT)	1–5	1–5	3–5	1–5	2–5	0–5	—

==== Pool 3 ====
Athlete	CHN	KOR	HKG	JPN	IRI	QAT
Zhou Hanming (CHN)	—	5–3	5–0	5–0	5–4	5–1
Oh Seung-hwan (KOR)	3–5	—	5–2	2–5	1–5	5–1
Tse Yu Ming (HKG)	0–5	2–5	—	5–1	4–5	5–4
Tetsuro Watanabe (JPN)	0–5	5–2	1–5	—	1–5	5–2
Mojtaba Abedini (IRI)	4–5	5–1	5–4	5–1	—	5–1
Nasr Al-Saadi (QAT)	1–5	1–5	4–5	2–5	1–5	—

==== Summary ====
Rank	Pool	Athlete	W	L	W/M	TD	TF
1	1	Oh Eun-seok (KOR)	6	0	1.000	+18	30
2	2	Wang Jingzhi (CHN)	6	0	1.000	+17	30
3	3	Zhou Hanming (CHN)	5	0	1.000	+17	25
4	2	Wiradech Kothny (THA)	5	1	0.833	+11	27
5	3	Mojtaba Abedini (IRI)	4	1	0.800	+12	24
6	2	Yuen Hou In (HKG)	4	2	0.667	+6	23
7	1	Masashi Nagara (JPN)	4	2	0.667	+5	23
8	1	Peyman Fakhri (IRI)	4	2	0.667	+4	24
9	2	Walbert Mendoza (PHI)	3	3	0.500	+7	25
10	1	Yevgeniy Frolov (KAZ)	3	3	0.500	+5	26
11	1	Mohammad Kazem (KUW)	3	3	0.500	0	24
12	3	Oh Seung-hwan (KOR)	2	3	0.400	−2	16
13	3	Tse Yu Ming (HKG)	2	3	0.400	−4	16
14	3	Tetsuro Watanabe (JPN)	2	3	0.400	−7	12
15	2	Yerali Tilenshiyev (KAZ)	2	4	0.333	−11	16
16	2	Ahmad Abdulkhedhr (KUW)	1	5	0.167	−8	19
17	1	Ekkathet Ketiam (THA)	1	5	0.167	−13	15
18	3	Nasr Al-Saadi (QAT)	0	5	0.000	−16	9
19	1	Gian Carlo Nocom (PHI)	0	6	0.000	−19	11
20	2	Ahmed Al-Siddiq (QAT)	0	6	0.000	−22	8

=== Knockout round ===
Round of 16
1	Oh Eun-seok (KOR)	15
16	Ahmad Abdulkhedhr (KUW)	7
9	Walbert Mendoza (PHI)	4
8	Peyman Fakhri (IRI)	15
5	Mojtaba Abedini (IRI)	15
12	Oh Seung-hwan (KOR)	14
13	Tse Yu Ming (HKG)	5
4	Wiradech Kothny (THA)	15
3	Zhou Hanming (CHN)	15
14	Tatsuro Watanabe (JPN)	10
11	Mohammad Kazem (KUW)	15
6	Yuen Hou In (HKG)	11
7	Masashi Nagara (JPN)	15
10	Yevgeniy Frolov (KAZ)	10
15	Yerali Tilenshiyev (KAZ)	8
2	Wang Jingzhi (CHN)	15

Quarterfinals
1	Oh Eun-seok (KOR)	15
8	Peyman Fakhri (IRI)	13
5	Mojtaba Abedini (IRI)	13^{D}
4	Wiradech Kothny (THA)	15
3	Zhou Hanming (CHN)	15
11	Mohammad Kazem (KUW)	9
7	Masashi Nagara (JPN)	10
2	Wang Jingzhi (CHN)	15

Semifinals
1	Oh Eun-seok (KOR)	15
4	Wiradech Kothny (THA)	11
3	Zhou Hanming (CHN)	12
2	Wang Jingzhi (CHN)	15

Gold medal match
1	Oh Eun-seok (KOR)	14
2	Wang Jingzhi (CHN)	15

== Final standing ==
Rank	Athlete
1st place, gold medalist(s)	Wang Jingzhi (CHN)
2nd place, silver medalist(s)	Oh Eun-seok (KOR)
3rd place, bronze medalist(s)	Wiradech Kothny (THA)
3rd place, bronze medalist(s)	Zhou Hanming (CHN)
5	Masashi Nagara (JPN)
6	Peyman Fakhri (IRI)
7	Mohammad Kazem (KUW)
8	Yuen Hou In (HKG)
9	Walbert Mendoza (PHI)
10	Yevgeniy Frolov (KAZ)
11	Oh Seung-hwan (KOR)
12	Tse Yu Ming (HKG)
13	Tetsuro Watanabe (JPN)
14	Yerali Tilenshiyev (KAZ)
15	Ahmad Abdulkhedhr (KUW)
16	Ekkathet Ketiam (THA)
17	Nasr Al-Saadi (QAT)
18	Gian Carlo Nocom (PHI)
19	Ahmed Al-Siddiq (QAT)
—	Mojtaba Abedini (IRI)
