= Fencing at the 2010 Asian Games – Men's individual sabre =

Men's individual sabre at the 2010 Asian Games
- Venue: Guangda Gymnasium
- Date: 19 November 2010
- Competitors: 23 from 14 nations

Medalists
| gold medal | Gu Bon-gil | South Korea |
| silver medal | Zhong Man | China |
| bronze medal | Oh Eun-seok | South Korea |
| bronze medal | Wang Jingzhi | China |

The men's individual sabre competition at the 2010 Asian Games in Guangzhou was held on 19 November at the Guangda Gymnasium.

== Schedule ==
All times are China Standard Time (UTC+08:00)

| Date | Time | Event |
|---|---|---|
| Friday, 19 November 2010 | 09:00 | Round of pools |
| Friday, 19 November 2010 | 10:30 | Round of 32 |
| Friday, 19 November 2010 | 11:20 | Round of 16 |
| Friday, 19 November 2010 | 12:20 | Quarterfinals |
| Friday, 19 November 2010 | 18:00 | Semifinals |
| Friday, 19 November 2010 | 19:40 | Gold medal match |

== Results ==
=== Round of pools ===
==== Pool 1 ====
| Athlete | KOR | JPN | KAZ | IND | QAT | KSA |
|---|---|---|---|---|---|---|
| Oh Eun-seok (KOR) | — | 5–2 | 5–1 | 5–1 | 3–5 | 5–0 |
| Satoshi Ogawa (JPN) | 2–5 | — | 5–3 | 5–0 | 5–4 | 5–2 |
| Zhanserik Turlybekov (KAZ) | 1–5 | 3–5 | — | 5–3 | 5–2 | 5–1 |
| Padma Kumaresan (IND) | 1–5 | 0–5 | 3–5 | — | 5–4 | 2–5 |
| Nasr Al-Saadi (QAT) | 5–3 | 4–5 | 2–5 | 4–5 | — | 5–2 |
| Meshari Al-Bashir (KSA) | 0–5 | 2–5 | 1–5 | 5–2 | 2–5 | — |

==== Pool 2 ====
| Athlete | KOR | IRI | JPN | QAT | IND | IOC |
|---|---|---|---|---|---|---|
| Gu Bon-gil (KOR) | — | 5–1 | 5–3 | 5–1 | 5–1 | 5–1 |
| Hamid Reza Taherkhani (IRI) | 1–5 | — | 3–5 | 5–1 | 3–5 | 5–3 |
| Koji Yamamoto (JPN) | 3–5 | 5–3 | — | 5–3 | 5–0 | 5–2 |
| Abdullah Barzegar (QAT) | 1–5 | 1–5 | 3–5 | — | 5–3 | 5–4 |
| Notum Walia (IND) | 1–5 | 5–3 | 0–5 | 3–5 | — | 2–5 |
| Khaled Al-Shamlan (IOC) | 1–5 | 3–5 | 2–5 | 4–5 | 5–2 | — |

==== Pool 3 ====
| Athlete | CHN | HKG | THA | MAS | IOC | KSA |
|---|---|---|---|---|---|---|
| Zhong Man (CHN) | — | 5–3 | 5–2 | 5–1 | 5–3 | 5–0 |
| Lam Hin Chung (HKG) | 3–5 | — | 5–3 | 5–1 | 5–3 | 5–1 |
| Wiradech Kothny (THA) | 2–5 | 3–5 | — | 4–5 | 5–1 | 5–0 |
| Yu Peng Kean (MAS) | 1–5 | 1–5 | 5–4 | — | 5–0 | 5–3 |
| Ahmad Abdulkhedhr (IOC) | 3–5 | 3–5 | 1–5 | 0–5 | — | 5–2 |
| Ghazi Al-Monasef (KSA) | 0–5 | 1–5 | 0–5 | 3–5 | 2–5 | — |

==== Pool 4 ====
| Athlete | CHN | IRI | PHI | KAZ | BRU |
|---|---|---|---|---|---|
| Wang Jingzhi (CHN) | — | 5–0 | 5–2 | 5–3 | 5–0 |
| Mojtaba Abedini (IRI) | 0–5 | — | 5–3 | 2–5 | 5–1 |
| Walbert Mendoza (PHI) | 2–5 | 3–5 | — | 1–5 | 4–5 |
| Yevgeniy Frolov (KAZ) | 3–5 | 5–2 | 5–1 | — | 5–2 |
| Mohd Yunos Hj Hamid (BRU) | 0–5 | 1–5 | 5–4 | 2–5 | — |

==== Summary ====
| Rank | Pool | Athlete | W | L | W/M | TD | TF |
|---|---|---|---|---|---|---|---|
| 1 | 2 | Gu Bon-gil (KOR) | 5 | 0 | 1.000 | +18 | 25 |
| 2 | 3 | Zhong Man (CHN) | 5 | 0 | 1.000 | +16 | 25 |
| 3 | 4 | Wang Jingzhi (CHN) | 4 | 0 | 1.000 | +15 | 20 |
| 4 | 1 | Oh Eun-seok (KOR) | 4 | 1 | 0.800 | +14 | 23 |
| 5 | 3 | Lam Hin Chung (HKG) | 4 | 1 | 0.800 | +10 | 23 |
| 5 | 2 | Koji Yamamoto (JPN) | 4 | 1 | 0.800 | +10 | 23 |
| 7 | 1 | Satoshi Ogawa (JPN) | 4 | 1 | 0.800 | +8 | 22 |
| 8 | 4 | Yevgeniy Frolov (KAZ) | 3 | 1 | 0.750 | +8 | 18 |
| 9 | 1 | Zhanserik Turlybekov (KAZ) | 3 | 2 | 0.600 | +3 | 19 |
| 10 | 3 | Yu Peng Kean (MAS) | 3 | 2 | 0.600 | 0 | 17 |
| 11 | 4 | Mojtaba Abedini (IRI) | 2 | 2 | 0.500 | −2 | 12 |
| 12 | 3 | Wiradech Kothny (THA) | 2 | 3 | 0.400 | +3 | 19 |
| 13 | 1 | Nasr Al-Saadi (QAT) | 2 | 3 | 0.400 | 0 | 20 |
| 14 | 2 | Hamid Reza Taherkhani (IRI) | 2 | 3 | 0.400 | −2 | 17 |
| 15 | 2 | Abdullah Barzegar (QAT) | 2 | 3 | 0.400 | −7 | 15 |
| 16 | 4 | Mohd Yunos Hj Hamid (BRU) | 1 | 3 | 0.250 | −11 | 8 |
| 17 | 2 | Khaled Al-Shamlan (IOC) | 1 | 4 | 0.200 | −7 | 15 |
| 18 | 3 | Ahmad Abdulkhedhr (IOC) | 1 | 4 | 0.200 | −10 | 12 |
| 19 | 2 | Notum Walia (IND) | 1 | 4 | 0.200 | −12 | 11 |
| 20 | 1 | Meshari Al-Bashir (KSA) | 1 | 4 | 0.200 | −12 | 10 |
| 21 | 1 | Padma Kumaresan (IND) | 1 | 4 | 0.200 | −13 | 11 |
| 22 | 4 | Walbert Mendoza (PHI) | 0 | 4 | 0.000 | −10 | 10 |
| 23 | 3 | Ghazi Al-Monasef (KSA) | 0 | 5 | 0.000 | −19 | 6 |

=== Knockout round ===
==== Final ====
| Gold medal match |
| 1 | Gu Bon-gil (KOR) | 15 |
| 2 | Zhong Man (CHN) | 13 |

==== Top half ====
Round of 32
17 | Khaled Al-Shamlan (IOC) | 7
16 | Mohd Yunos Hj Hamid (BRU) | 15

Round of 16
1 | Gu Bon-gil (KOR) | 15
16 | Mohd Yunos Hj Hamid (BRU) | 6
9 | Zhanserik Turlybekov (KAZ) | 15
8 | Yevgeniy Frolov (KAZ) | 10
5 | Lam Hin Chung (HKG) | 15
12 | Wiradech Kothny (THA) | 8
13 | Nasr Al-Saadi (QAT) | 6
4 | Oh Eun-seok (KOR) | 15

Quarterfinals
1 | Gu Bon-gil (KOR) | 15
9 | Zhanserik Turlybekov (KAZ) | 4
5 | Lam Hin Chung (HKG) | 6
4 | Oh Eun-seok (KOR) | 15

Semifinals
1 | Gu Bon-gil (KOR) | 15
4 | Oh Eun-seok (KOR) | 13

==== Bottom half ====
Round of 32
15 | Abdullah Barzegar (QAT) | 14
18 | Ahmad Abdulkhedhr (IOC) | 15

Round of 16
3 | Wang Jingzhi (CHN) | 15
14 | Hamid Reza Taherkhani (IRI) | 6
11 | Mojtaba Abedini (IRI) | 15
6 | Koji Yamamoto (JPN) | 13
7 | Satoshi Ogawa (JPN) | 15
10 | Yu Peng Kean (MAS) | 8
18 | Ahmad Abdulkhedhr (IOC) | 4
2 | Zhong Man (CHN) | 15

Quarterfinals
3 | Wang Jingzhi (CHN) | 15
11 | Mojtaba Abedini (IRI) | 4
7 | Satoshi Ogawa (JPN) | 7
2 | Zhong Man (CHN) | 15

Semifinals
3 | Wang Jingzhi (CHN) | 11
2 | Zhong Man (CHN) | 15

== Final standing ==
| Rank | Athlete |
|---|---|
| 1st place, gold medalist(s) | Gu Bon-gil (KOR) |
| 2nd place, silver medalist(s) | Zhong Man (CHN) |
| 3rd place, bronze medalist(s) | Oh Eun-seok (KOR) |
| 3rd place, bronze medalist(s) | Wang Jingzhi (CHN) |
| 5 | Lam Hin Chung (HKG) |
| 6 | Satoshi Ogawa (JPN) |
| 7 | Zhanserik Turlybekov (KAZ) |
| 8 | Mojtaba Abedini (IRI) |
| 9 | Koji Yamamoto (JPN) |
| 10 | Yevgeniy Frolov (KAZ) |
| 11 | Yu Peng Kean (MAS) |
| 12 | Wiradech Kothny (THA) |
| 13 | Nasr Al-Saadi (QAT) |
| 14 | Hamid Reza Taherkhani (IRI) |
| 15 | Mohd Yunos Hj Hamid (BRU) |
| 16 | Ahmad Abdulkhedhr (IOC) |
| 17 | Abdullah Barzegar (QAT) |
| 18 | Khaled Al-Shamlan (IOC) |
| 19 | Notum Walia (IND) |
| 20 | Meshari Al-Bashir (KSA) |
| 21 | Padma Kumaresan (IND) |
| 22 | Walbert Mendoza (PHI) |
| 23 | Ghazi Al-Monasef (KSA) |
