= Janczak =

Janczak is a Polish-language surname. Notable people with this surname include:

- Andrew M. Janczak, American-Norwegian professor of animal welfare and animal behaviour at NMBU
- Eugeniusz Janczak (born 1955), Polish sports shooter
- Krzysztof Janczak (born 1974), Polish volleyball player
- Krzysztof Aleksander Janczak (born 1983), Polish composer
