= Wrestling at the 1996 Summer Olympics – Men's Greco-Roman 90 kg =

Men's Greco-Roman 90 kg at the Games of the XXVI Olympiad
- Venue: Georgia World Congress Center
- Dates: 22–23 July 1996
- Competitors: 23 from 23 nations

Medalists
1st place, gold medalist(s)		Vyacheslav Oliynyk	Ukraine
2nd place, silver medalist(s)		Jacek Fafiński	Poland
3rd place, bronze medalist(s)		Maik Bullmann	Germany

The men's Greco-Roman 90 kilograms at the 1996 Summer Olympics as part of the wrestling program were held at the Georgia World Congress Center from July 22 to July 23. The gold and silver medalists were determined by the final match of the main single-elimination bracket. The losers advanced to the repechage. These matches determined the bronze medalist for the event.

== Results ==
=== Round 1 ===
	Score		CP
1/16 finals
Eom Jin-han (KOR)	1–2	Reynaldo Peña (CUB)	1–3 PP
Hakkı Başar (TUR)	6–1	Gogi Koguashvili (RUS)	3–1 PP
Goran Kasum (YUG)	3–0	Doug Cox (CAN)	3–0 PO
Vyacheslav Oliynyk (UKR)	12–0	Fahrudin Hodžić (BIH)	4–0 ST
Harri Koskela (FIN)	0–7	Sergey Matviyenko (KAZ)	0–3 PO
Aleksandr Sidorenko (BLR)	3–0	Derrick Waldroup (USA)	3–0 PO
Maik Bullmann (GER)	3–0	Moustafa Ramadan Hussein (EGY)	3–0 PO
Jacek Fafiński (POL)	4–0 Fall	Abdelaziz Essafoui (MAR)	4–0 TO
Marek Švec (CZE)	1–3	Rozy Rejepow (TKM)	1–3 PP
Lucio Vásquez (PER)	0–10	Iordanis Konstantinidis (GRE)	0–4 ST
Tsolak Yeghishyan (ARM)	5–1	Nándor Gelénesi (HUN)	3–1 PP
Hristo Dimitrov (BUL)		Bye	

=== Round 2 ===
	Score		CP
1/8 finals
Hristo Dimitrov (BUL)	3–0	Reynaldo Peña (CUB)	3–0 PO
Hakkı Başar (TUR)	3–0	Goran Kasum (YUG)	3–0 PO
Vyacheslav Oliynyk (UKR)	4–1	Sergey Matviyenko (KAZ)	3–1 PP
Aleksandr Sidorenko (BLR)	0–1	Maik Bullmann (GER)	0–3 PO
Jacek Fafiński (POL)	12–2	Rozy Rejepow (TKM)	4–1 SP
Iordanis Konstantinidis (GRE)	12–0	Tsolak Yeghishyan (ARM)	4–0 ST
Repechage
Eom Jin-han (KOR)	0–4	Gogi Koguashvili (RUS)	0–3 PO
Doug Cox (CAN)	2–5	Fahrudin Hodžić (BIH)	1–3 PP
Harri Koskela (FIN)	1–11	Derrick Waldroup (USA)	1–4 SP
Moustafa Ramadan Hussein (EGY)	4–0	Abdelaziz Essafoui (MAR)	3–0 PO
Marek Švec (CZE)	10–0	Lucio Vásquez (PER)	4–0 ST
Nándor Gelénesi (HUN)		Bye	

=== Round 3 ===
	Score		CP
Quarterfinals
Hristo Dimitrov (BUL)	3–5	Hakkı Başar (TUR)	1–3 PP
Vyacheslav Oliynyk (UKR)	4–2	Maik Bullmann (GER)	3–1 PP
Jacek Fafiński (POL)		Bye	
Iordanis Konstantinidis (GRE)		Bye	
Repechage
Nándor Gelénesi (HUN)	2–1	Gogi Koguashvili (RUS)	3–1 PP
Fahrudin Hodžić (BIH)	0–12	Derrick Waldroup (USA)	0–4 ST
Moustafa Ramadan Hussein (EGY)	4–8	Marek Švec (CZE)	1–3 PP
Reynaldo Peña (CUB)	3–0	Goran Kasum (YUG)	3–0 PO
Sergey Matviyenko (KAZ)	1–1	Aleksandr Sidorenko (BLR)	1–3 PP
Rozy Rejepow (TKM)	2–5	Tsolak Yeghishyan (ARM)	1–3 PP

=== Round 4 ===
	Score		CP
Semifinals
Hakkı Başar (TUR)	0–3	Vyacheslav Oliynyk (UKR)	0–3 PO
Jacek Fafiński (POL)	6–0	Iordanis Konstantinidis (GRE)	3–0 PO
Repechage
Nándor Gelénesi (HUN)	0–6	Derrick Waldroup (USA)	0–3 PO
Marek Švec (CZE)	4–2	Reynaldo Peña (CUB)	3–1 PP
Aleksandr Sidorenko (BLR)	3–1	Tsolak Yeghishyan (ARM)	3–1 PP
Hristo Dimitrov (BUL)	0–11 Fall	Maik Bullmann (GER)	0–4 TO

=== Round 5 ===
	Score		CP
Repechage
Derrick Waldroup (USA)	0–4	Maik Bullmann (GER)	0–3 PO
Marek Švec (CZE)	1–3	Aleksandr Sidorenko (BLR)	1–3 PP

=== Round 6 ===
	Score		CP
Repechage
Hakkı Başar (TUR)	0–4 Fall	Maik Bullmann (GER)	0–4 TO
Aleksandr Sidorenko (BLR)	5–0	Iordanis Konstantinidis (GRE)	3–0 PO

=== Finals ===
	Score		CP
Classification 7th–8th
Derrick Waldroup (USA)	10–2	Marek Švec (CZE)	3–1 PP
Classification 5th–6th
Hakkı Başar (TUR)	4–1 Fall	Iordanis Konstantinidis (GRE)	4–0 TO
Bronze medal match
Maik Bullmann (GER)	2–0	Aleksandr Sidorenko (BLR)	3–0 PO
Gold medal match
Vyacheslav Oliynyk (UKR)	6–0	Jacek Fafiński (POL)	3–0 PO

== Final standing ==
Rank	Athlete
1st place, gold medalist(s)	Vyacheslav Oliynyk (UKR)
2nd place, silver medalist(s)	Jacek Fafiński (POL)
3rd place, bronze medalist(s)	Maik Bullmann (GER)
4	Aleksandr Sidorenko (BLR)
5	Hakkı Başar (TUR)
6	Iordanis Konstantinidis (GRE)
7	Derrick Waldroup (USA)
8	Marek Švec (CZE)
9	Tsolak Yeghishyan (ARM)
10	Reynaldo Peña (CUB)
11	Sergey Matviyenko (KAZ)
12	Rozy Rejepow (TKM)
13	Gogi Koguashvili (RUS)
14	Moustafa Ramadan Hussein (EGY)
15	Hristo Dimitrov (BUL)
16	Nándor Gelénesi (HUN)
17	Fahrudin Hodžić (BIH)
18	Goran Kasum (YUG)
19	Doug Cox (CAN)
20	Harri Koskela (FIN)
20	Eom Jin-han (KOR)
22	Abdelaziz Essafoui (MAR)
22	Lucio Vásquez (PER)
