= Miguel Robles =

Miguel Robles may refer to:

- Miguel Robles (Arrowverse), Batwoman character
- Miguel Robles (fencer) (born 1974), Bolivian fencer
- Miguel Robles (swimmer) (born 1987), Mexican swimmer
- Miguel Alessio Robles, Mexican lawyer and professor in law
