= Hristo Dimitrov =

Hristo Dimitrov may refer to:

- Hristo Dimitrov (gymnast) (born 1991), Bulgarian gymnast
- Hristo Dimitrov (wrestler) (born 1968), Bulgarian Olympic wrestler
