= Casimiro Zertucha =

Cuban violinist (1880–1950)

Casimiro Zertucha (1880–1950) was a Cuban violinist. He was born in Havana and moved to Bejucal as a child. He studied violin with Juan Mercado in Bejucal and Tomas de la Rosa at the National Conservatory in Havana. He then went to Paris where he studied with Jose White Lafitte and Martin Marsick. He conducted a small orchestra at the festivals organized by the French patron Alexandre Jean Joseph de la Riche. In all, he spent a decade and a half in France. In 1914, he returned to Cuba, where he became a teacher at the Conservatorio Falcón. He also served as concertmaster of the Chamber Orchestra of this institution, directed by the pianist Alberto Falcón. He died in 1950.
