= Lee Seung-won =

Lee Seung-won may refer to:

- Lee Seung-won (fencer) (born 1979), South Korean fencer
- Lee Seung-won (footballer) (born 2003), South Korean footballer
