= Aleksandr Sidorenko =

Aleksandr Sidorenko may refer to:

- Aleksandr Sidorenko (wrestler) (born 1972), Belarusian wrestler
- Alexandre Sidorenko (born 1988), French tennis player
- Oleksandr Sydorenko (1960–2022), Ukrainian swimmer
