= Cédric Séguin =

French fencer (born 1973)

Personal information
- Born: 3 April 1973 (age 53) Pierrelatte, France

Sport
- Sport: Fencing
Medal record
Men's fencing
Representing France
Olympic Games
Silver medal – second place	2000 Sydney	Sabre, team

Cédric Séguin (born 3 April 1973) is a French fencer. He won a silver medal in the team sabre event at the 2000 Summer Olympics.
