= Alexander Weber =

German fencer (born 1978)

Personal information
- Born: 4 January 1978 (age 48) Bielefeld, West Germany

Sport
- Sport: Fencing
Medal record
Men's fencing
Representing Germany
Olympic Games
Bronze medal – third place	2000 Sydney	Sabre, team
Representing Argentina
Pan American Games
Bronze medal – third place	2007 Rio de Janeiro	Sabre, team

Alexander Achten (born Alexander Weber; 4 January 1978) is a German-born Argentine fencer. He won a bronze medal in the team sabre event at the 2000 Summer Olympics.

== See also ==
- List of Pennsylvania State University Olympians
