= Derrick Waldroup =

American wrestler (born 1962)

Personal information
- Born: October 22, 1962 (age 63) Chicago, Illinois, U.S.

Sport
- Country: United States
- Sport: Wrestling
- Event: Greco-Roman
- College team: Triton College
- Club: U.S. Army
- Team: USA

Derrick Waldroup (born October 22, 1962) is an American wrestler. He competed in the men's Greco-Roman 90 kg at the 1996 Summer Olympics.
