= Nándor Gelénesi =

Hungarian wrestler

Personal information
- Nationality: Hungarian
- Born: 7 February 1973 (age 53) Győr, Hungary

Sport
- Sport: Wrestling

Nándor Gelénesi (born 7 February 1973) is a Hungarian wrestler. He competed in the men's Greco-Roman 90 kg at the 1996 Summer Olympics.
