= Lucio Vásquez =

Peruvian wrestler

Personal information
- Full name: Lucio Vásquez Izquierdo
- Born: 9 February 1973 (age 53) Lima, Peru

Sport
- Sport: Wrestling

Lucio Vásquez (born 9 February 1973) is a Peruvian wrestler. He competed in the men's Greco-Roman 90 kg at the 1996 Summer Olympics.
