= Fahrudin Hodžić =

Bosnia and Herzegovina wrestler

Personal information
- Nationality: Bosnian
- Born: 8 September 1963 (age 62) Sarajevo, PR Bosnia and Herzegovina, FPR Yugoslavia

Sport
- Sport: Wrestling

Fahrudin Hodžić (born 8 September 1963) is a Bosnian wrestler. He competed in the men's Greco-Roman 90 kg at the 1996 Summer Olympics.
