= Mathieu Gourdain =

French fencer (born 1974)

Personal information
- Born: 4 May 1974 (age 52) Vernon, France

Sport
- Sport: Fencing
Medal record
Men's fencing
Representing France
Olympic Games
Silver medal – second place	2000 Sydney	Sabre, individual
Silver medal – second place	2000 Sydney	Sabre, team

Mathieu Gourdain (French pronunciation: [matjø ɡuʁdɛ̃]; born 4 May 1974) is a French fencer. He won silver medals in the individual and team sabre events at the 2000 Summer Olympics.
