= Tsolak Yeghishyan =

Armenian Greco-Roman wrestler

Personal information
- Born: 8 December 1970 (age 55) Gyumri, Armenian SSR, Soviet Union
- Height: 1.77 m (5 ft 9 1/2 in)
- Weight: 88 kg (194 lb)

Sport
- Sport: Wrestling
- Event: Greco-Roman
- Coached by: Aram Sargsyan

Tsolak Yeghishyan (Armenian: Ցոլակ Եղիշյան, born 8 December 1970) is an Armenian Greco-Roman wrestler. He became an Espoir European Champion in 1990. Yeghishyan competed at the 1996 Summer Olympics in the men's 90 kg division, coming in 9th place.
