= Eero Lehmann =

German fencer

Personal information
- Born: 17 May 1974 (age 52) Düsseldorf, West Germany

Sport
- Sport: Fencing

Eero Lehmann (born 17 May 1974) is a German fencer. He competed in the individual sabre event at the 2000 Summer Olympics.
