= Archil Lortkipanidze =

Georgian fencer

Personal information
- Born: 7 May 1970 (age 54); Tbilisi, Georgian SSR, Soviet Union

Sport
- Sport: Fencing

Archil Lortkipanidze (Georgian: არჩილ ლორთქიფანიძე, born 7 May 1970) is a Georgian fencer. He competed in the individual sabre event at the 1996 Summer Olympics. Since then, he has worked at many clubs in and out of his country. He currently works at Tim Morehouse Fencing Club with 2008 silver medalist Tim Morehouse and former Olympian Slava Grigoriev.
