= Diego Drajer =

Argentine fencer (born 1974)

Personal information
- Born: 26 March 1974 (age 52)

Sport
- Sport: Fencing
Medal record
Representing Argentina
Pan American Games
Bronze medal – third place	2007 Rio de Janeiro	Team sabre

Diego Drajer (born 26 March 1974) is an Argentine fencer. He competed in the individual sabre event at the 2000 Summer Olympics.
