= Witold Roman =

Polish volleyball player (born 1967)

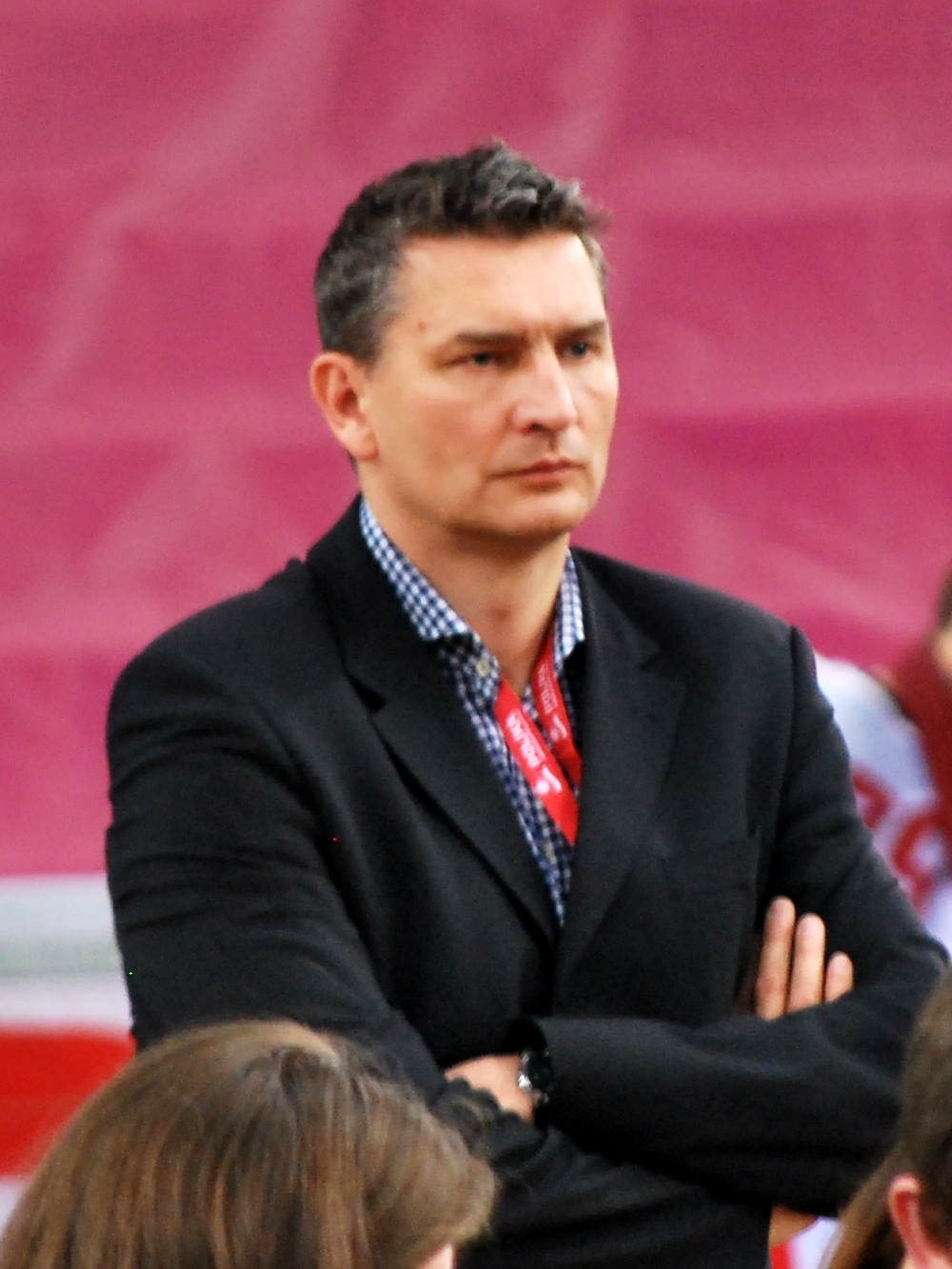
- Witold Roman in 2014

Personal information
- Nationality: Polish
- Born: 6 March 1967 (age 58); Warsaw, Poland

Sport
- Sport: Volleyball

Witold Roman (born 6 March 1967) is a Polish volleyball player. He competed in the men's tournament at the 1996 Summer Olympics. Played 259 games for the Polish national team between 1987 and 1997. Participated in the European Championships in: Stockholm (1989) – 7th place, Berlin (1991) – 7th place, Turku (1993) – 7th place, Athens (1995) – 6th place.
