= Aleksey Frosin =

Russian fencer (born 1978)

Personal information
- Born: 14 February 1978 (age 48) Moscow, Russian SFSR, Soviet Union

Sport
- Sport: Fencing
Medal record
Men's fencing
Representing Russia
Olympic Games
Gold medal – first place	2000 Sydney	Sabre team

Aleksey Frosin (born 14 February 1978) is a Russian fencer who won a gold medal in the team sabre competition at the 2000 Summer Olympics in Sydney together with Aleksey Dyachenko, Stanislav Pozdnyakov, and Sergey Sharikov. He won the bronze medal in the individual and team sabre (together with Nikolay Kovalev, Stanislav Pozdnyakov, and Aleksey Yakimenko at the 2006 World Fencing Championships.
