= Krzysztof Aleksander Janczak =

Krzysztof A. Janczak
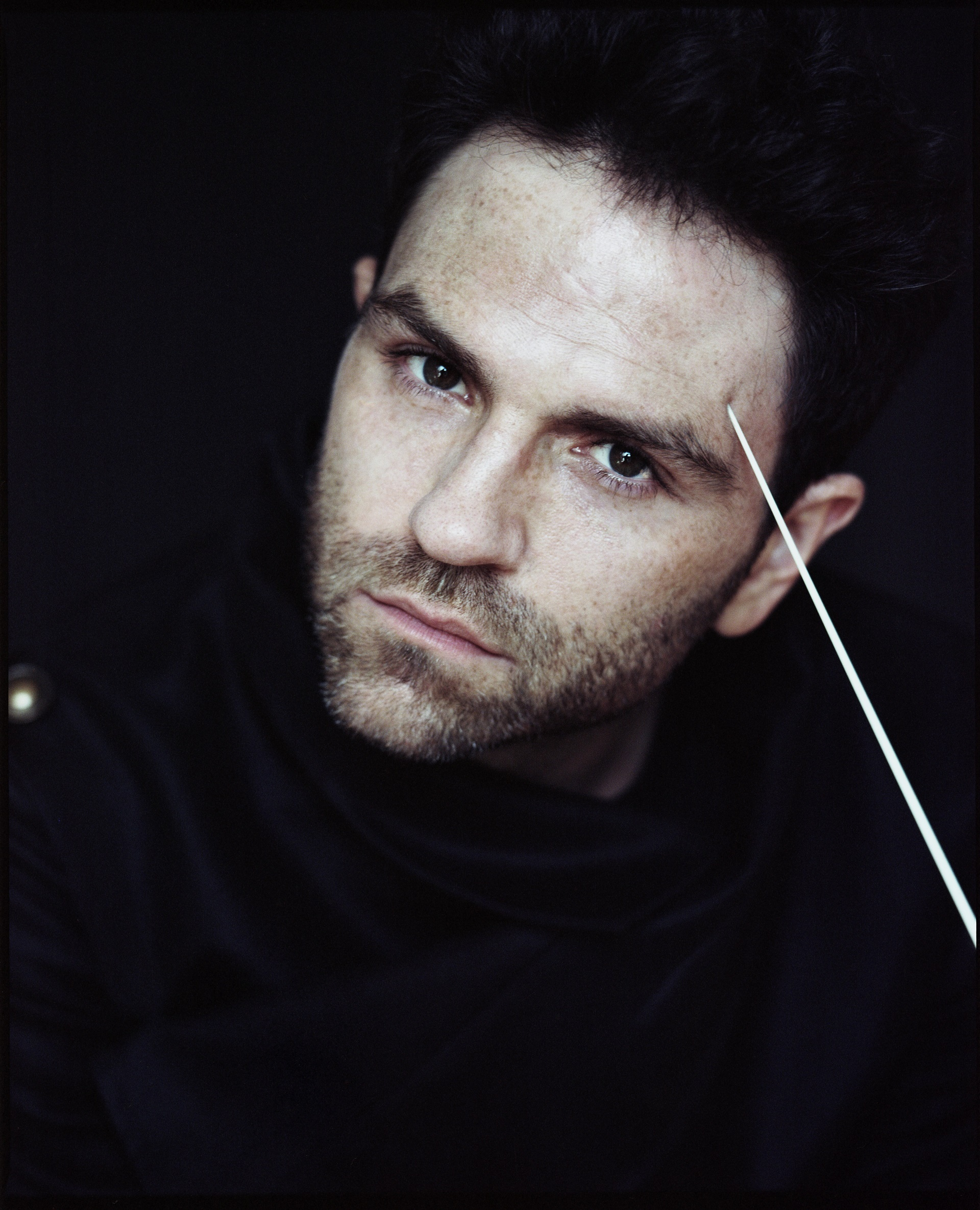
- Krzysztof A. Janczak, 2018

Background information
- Born: Krzysztof Aleksander Janczak; 1 May 1983 (age 43); Warsaw, Poland
- Genres: Film score, contemporary classical music
- Occupations: Composer, record producer, sound designer, mixing engineer, performer, musicologist
- Instrument: Piano
- Years active: 2002–present
- Label: KAJ Records
- Website: kaj.cc

Krzysztof Aleksander Janczak (born 1 May 1983) is a Polish composer of film, classical and TV music, sound designer and musicologist.

== Biography ==
Janczak was born on 1 May 1983 in Warsaw, Poland. From 2002 to 2006 he studied in Institute of Musicology at University of Warsaw. In 2007, he got his Diploma of Musicology and received the Artistic Scholarship of the French Government. He continued his studies in composition and orchestration classes in École Normale de Musique de Paris and Maurice Ravel Conservatory in Paris with Michel Merlet, the winner of the Grand Prix de Rome and former student of Olivier Messiaen and Igor Stravinsky. In 2008 he got his Diplomas of musical composition and Orchestration with a special mention and in 2009 he got Advanced Diploma of Orchestration.

Janczak is the award-winning composer of film, classical and television music. He received the prizes and distinctions at numerous festivals and competitions, among other: International Film Festival Camerimage in Łódź (2004 and 2008); Silver Cross of Merit form President of Poland in Warsaw (2006); 1st, 2nd and 3rd Prize at the International Composers Competition "Garden Music" in Kraków (2007, 2009 and 2011); Two Honorary Mentions and Three 1st Prizes at the Composers Competition of Contemporary Music "The Silver Pane" in Kraków (2007, 2009 and 2011); 1st Prize at International Composers Competition "Handel-Inspired" in London; 1st Prize and Distinction at "Eyes & Ears of Europe Awards" in Munich; Golden World Medal at "New York Festivals" (2011) and many others.

He also received many artistic scholarships, among other: Artistic Scholarship of the French Government (2007/2008 and 2008/2009), Scholarship of Creation Support Foundation of ZAiKS association (2007, 2008 and 2010), Artistic Scholarship of the École Normale de Musique de Paris (Zygmunt Zaleski Foundation) and Artistic Scholarship of International Nadia and Lili Boulanger Foundation in Paris (2009/2010)

Since his debut in 2002 he has scored numerous movies and documentaries, composed the music and created sound design for many TV Channels, including 13th Street, Disney Channel, MDR, DMAX, Kabel Deutschland, TV Salzburg, TV Business, TVP1, TVP2, TVP3 and TVP Info. He also composed more than 40 classical works: orchestral, chamber and piano cycles that have been performed in Paris, London, Stockholm, Warsaw, Kraków, Sydney and Orléans.

== Works ==
- 2003 – 6 Ostinatos (piano)
- 2003 – Six Tangos (septet)
- 2004 – Warsaw Uprising Symphony (symphony orchestra)
- 2004 – Trois Danses (wind quintet)
- 2006 – Les Labyrinthes (piano)
- 2006 – Pictures from Katyń (two pianos)
- 2006 – TGV (clarinet, violin, violoncello, accordion et piano)
- 2006 – La lettre à un ami (flute or violin and piano)
- 2006 – The Six Seasons (alto saxophone and string orchestra)
- 2007 – Le Tombeau d'Händel (church organ)
- 2007 – La Sorcière (piano, celesta, two harps, bass drum, string quartet and tape)
- 2007 – Gulliver's Travels (accordion and big band)
- 2007 – Assenzio e Anguria (symphony orchestra)
- 2007 – Pater Noster (soprano and string quartet)
- 2007 – Danses Chocholiques (string orchestra)
- 2007 – Tableaux d'Enfants d'après Stanisław Wyspiański (piano)
- 2008 – Fantasia No. 1 (piano)
- 2008 – Moments musicaux (flute, violin, violoncello and piano)
- 2008 – Message de Monsieur Cogito (baritone and orchestra)
- 2008 – Tatra dance (viola or violoncello solo)
- 2008 – Silver Music (flute, violoncello and two pianos)
- 2008 – Cinderella (orchestra)
- 2009 – Preludes Nos. 1–6 (piano)
- 2009 – De profundis (choir)
- 2009 – 24 Variations sur le thème de Michel Merlet (two pianos)
- 2009 – Mysterium – Life of Saint Paul (choir and symphony orchestra)
- 2009 – 24 Variations for 6 soloistes (flute, bass clarinet, violin, viola, cello and piano)
- 2009 – Petit Boléro (symphony orchestra)
- 2010 – La Suite de la Lune (piano)
- 2010 – Trois Tableaux (flute, bass clarinet, violin, viola, violoncello and piano)
- 2010 – Danses d'après Henri Matisse (string orchestra and piano)
- 2010 – Three Vertigos (string orchestra and piano)
- 2010 – Sextuor Hypnotique (string sextet)
- 2010 – Ballade No. 1 (piano)
- 2010 – Vertigo (piano)
- 2010 – Prelude (four flutes)
- 2010 – Day Seasons (soprano and orchestra)
- 2011 – The Clockwork Music [20 pieces] (saxophone quartet, violin, accordion and double bass) [Album]
- 2011 – Clockwork Preludes (chromatic accordion)
- 2011 – Clockwork Saxophones – ('solo' soprano-, alto-, tenor-, baritone saxophone)
- 2011 – Three Fugludes (saxophone quartet, violin, accordion and bass guitar)
- 2011 – Six Curieusques (string quartet and soprano saxophone or piano)
- 2011 – Camino de Santiago (orchestra and male choir)
  1. Vobiscum in Via Eximus [lyrics: Andrzej Zajac OFMConv]
  2. Revelationes Coelestes [lyrics: Ave Maria]
  3. Musica De Celtae (Celtic Music)
  4. Revelationes Coelestes [lyrics: Recordare]
  5. In Fine Viae [lyrics: Sanctus]

== Discography ==
- 2006 – Warsaw Uprising Symphony
- 2006 – Les Labyrinthes
- 2006 – Phantasmagorias
- 2007 – Handel-Inspired
- 2008 – Antti Manninen plays Prokofiev, Scriabin, Janczak, Albeniz
- 2009 – Northern Lights
- 2009 – Mysterium – Life of Saint Paul
- 2010 – Le Cirque de la Lune
- 2011 – Early Piano Works
- 2011 – The Clockwork Music
- 2011 – Romantic Impressions for piano by Francisco K. Hernández
- 2012 – Camino de Santiago
- 2012 – Dans les pas de Marie Curie (Original Motion Picture Soundtrack)
- 2012 – Piandemonium
- 2013 – Spider and Flies (Original Motion Picture Soundtrack)
- 2013 – Cargo 3 (Original Game Soundtrack)
- 2014 – Team (Original Motion Picture Soundtrack)
- 2015 – Hydropolis (Original Motion Picture Soundtrack)
- 2015 – Our Friend Satan (Original Motion Picture Soundtrack)
- 2017 – Ave Maria
- 2017 – Stolen Harvest (Original Motion Picture Soundtrack)

== Awards ==
- 2004 – Golden Tadpole for "The Winter" (Score for Piotr Sobociński movie) – "Camerimage", Łódź
- 2006 – Silver Cross of Merit – from President of Poland at 62nd Anniversary of Warsaw Uprising, Warsaw
- 2006 – Honourable Mention – "The Silver Pane", Kraków
- 2006 – 2nd Prize – International Composers Competition "Garden Music", Kraków
- 2007 – 1st Prize – International Composers Competition – "Handel-Inspired ", London
- 2008 – Bronze Tadpole and Panavision Award for "The Father" (Score for Michal Sobociński film) – "Camerimage", Łódź
- 2008 – 1st Prize – "The Silver Pane", Kraków
- 2008 – Honourable Mention – "The Silver Pane", Kraków
- 2008 – 1st Prize – International Composers Competition – "Garden Music", Kraków
- 2009 – Finalist of International Composers Competition organised by Loiret Symphony Orchestra, Saint-Jean-de-la-Ruelle
- 2009 – 1st Award – Best Audio Design and Composition – "Eyes & Ears of Europe Awards", Munich
- 2010 – Silver Prize – Best Sound Design – "PromaxBDA Awards", Lisbon
- 2010 – Golden Prize – Best Channel Branding – "EBUconntect Awards", Lucerne
- 2010 – Silver Prize (1st Category) – International Media Competition "PromaxBDA World Awards", Los Angeles
- 2010 – Silver Prize (2nd Category) – International Media Competition "PromaxBDA World Awards", Los Angeles
- 2010 – Red Dot: Best of the best – International Media Competition « Red Dot Awards », Berlin
- 2010 – 1st Prize (1st Category) – "The Silver Pane", Kraków
- 2010 – 1st Prize (3rd Category) – "The Silver Pane", Kraków
- 2010 – Distinction – "Eyes & Ears of Europe Awards", Munich
- 2011 – 3rd Prize – International Composers Competition – "Garden Music", Wrocław
- 2011 – Golden World Medal – World's Best TV & Films – "New York Festivals", New York City
- 2011 – 3rd Prize – Transatlantyk Film Music Competition "Young Composer 2011", Poznań
- 2011 – Special Mention – SoundTrack_Cologne 8.0 "European Talent Award 2011" Cologne
- 2011 – Universal Music Special Award – SoundTrack_Cologne 8.0 "European Talent Award 2011" Cologne

== Publications ==
- The piano texture of Visions fugitives Op. 22 by Sergei Prokofiev, (Bachelor thesis) Institute of Musicology at University of Warsaw, Warsaw 2007
- Relation of music and lyrics in Veni Creator Spiritus from the Eight Symphony by Gustav Mahler, (Master thesis) Institute of Musicology at University of Warsaw, Warsaw 2019
