= Yan Xiandong =

Chinese fencer

Personal information
- Born: 5 March 1973 (age 53)

Sport
- Sport: Fencing

Yan Xiandong (born 5 March 1973) is a Chinese fencer. He competed in the individual sabre event at the 1996 Summer Olympics.
