= Péter Takács (fencer, born 1973) =

Hungarian fencer

Personal information
- Born: 29 June 1973 (age 53) Budapest, Hungary

Sport
- Sport: Fencing

Péter Takács (born 29 June 1973) is a Hungarian fencer. He competed in the team sabre event at the 2000 Summer Olympics.
