= Victor Găureanu =

Romanian fencer (1967–2017)

Dan Găureanu
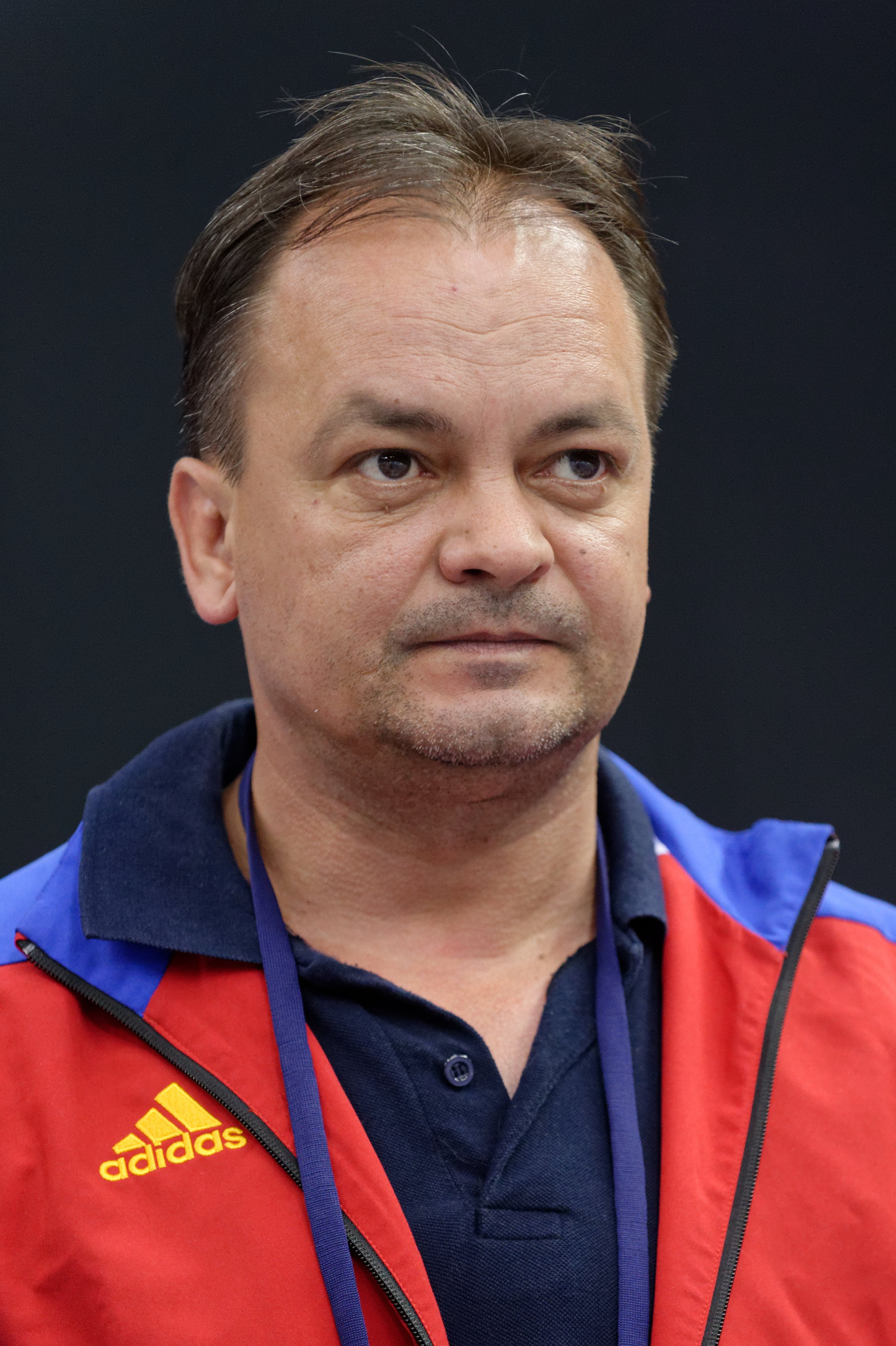
- Găureanu in 2015

Personal information
- Full name: Victor Dan Găureanu
- Born: 15 November 1967 Coțușca, Romania
- Died: 20 May 2017 (aged 49) Craiova, Romania
- Height: 1.76 m (5 ft 9 in)
- Weight: 70 kg (150 lb)

Fencing career
- Sport: Fencing
- National coach: Alexandru Chiculiță
- Retired: 2003
- FIE ranking: ranking (archive)
Medal record
Men's Sabre
Representing Romania
World Championships
Bronze medal – third place	1994 Athens	Team
Bronze medal – third place	2001 Nîmes	Team
European Championships
Bronze medal – third place	1999 Bolzano	Individual

Victor Dan Găureanu, better known as Dan Găureanu (15 November 1967 – 20 May 2017) was a Romanian fencer.

He competed in the sabre events at the 1992 and 2000 Summer Olympics. He won the bronze medal at the 1999 World Fencing Championships after he was defeated by Wiradech Kothny, who eventually won the gold medal. As part of the Romanian team he earned two bronze medals at the World Championships.

He died on 20 May 2017.
