= Hristo Dimitrov (wrestler) =

Bulgarian wrestler

Personal information
- Nationality: Bulgarian
- Born: 16 November 1968 (age 57) Lovech, Bulgaria

Sport
- Sport: Wrestling

Hristo Dimitrov (born 16 November 1968) is a Bulgarian wrestler. He competed in the men's Greco-Roman 90 kg at the 1996 Summer Olympics.
