= Laurent Waller =

Swiss fencer

Personal information
- Born: 28 December 1966 (age 59)

Sport
- Sport: Fencing

Laurent Waller (born 28 December 1966) is a Swiss fencer. He competed in the individual sabre event at the 2000 Summer Olympics.
