= Dennis Bauer =

German fencer (born 1980)

Personal information
- Born: 18 December 1980 (age 45) Koblenz, West Germany

Sport
- Sport: Fencing
Medal record
Men's fencing
Representing Germany
Olympic Games
Bronze medal – third place	2000 Sydney	Sabre, team

Dennis Bauer (born 18 December 1980) is a German fencer. He won a bronze medal in the team sabre event at the 2000 Summer Olympics.
