= Aleksandr Sidorenko (wrestler) =

Belarusian wrestler

Personal information
- Nationality: Belarusian
- Born: 8 January 1972 (age 54) Gomel, Belarus

Sport
- Sport: Wrestling

Aleksandr Sidorenko (born 8 January 1972) is a Belarusian wrestler. He competed in the men's Greco-Roman 90 kg at the 1996 Summer Olympics.
