= Alberto Falcón =

Spanish fencer

Personal information
- Full name: Alberto Falcón Cabrera
- Born: 3 May 1970 (age 56) Madrid, Spain
- Height: 182 cm (6 ft 0 in)
- Weight: 78 kg (172 lb)

Sport
- Sport: Fencing

Alberto Falcón Cabrera (Note: In this Spanish name, the first or paternal surname is Falcón and the second or maternal family name is Cabrera.) (born 3 May 1970) is a Spanish fencer. He competed in the sabre events at the 1992 and 2000 Summer Olympics.
