= Tom Strzalkowski =

American fencer

Personal information
- Born: December 30, 1971 (age 54) Kraków, Poland

Sport
- Sport: Fencing
Medal record
Representing United States
Pan American Games
Gold medal – first place	1995 Mar del Plata	Team sabre

Thomas Paul "Tom" Strzalkowski (born December 30, 1971) is an American fencer. He competed in the individual and team sabre events at the 1996 Summer Olympics.

He resides in Denver where he works as a development manager for a food production company.

== See also ==
- List of Pennsylvania State University Olympians
