= Bruno Cornet =

Paraguayan fencer

Personal information
- Born: 3 July 1977 (age 48)

Sport
- Sport: Fencing

Bruno Cornet (born 3 July 1977) is a Paraguayan fencer. He competed in the individual sabre event at the 1996 Summer Olympics.
