= Steffen Wiesinger =

German fencer

Personal information
- Born: 27 November 1969 (age 56) Baden-Württemberg, West Germany

Sport
- Sport: Fencing
Medal record
Representing Germany
World Championships
Bronze medal – third place	1993 Essen	Individual sabre
Bronze medal – third place	1993 Essen	Team sabre
Summer Universiade
Gold medal – first place	1991 Sheffield	Team sabre
Bronze medal – third place	1995 Fukuoka	Individual sabre

Steffen Wiesinger (born 27 November 1969) is a German fencer. He competed in the sabre events at the 1992 and 1996 Summer Olympics.
