= Rozy Rejepow =

Turkmenistan wrestler

Personal information
- Nationality: Turkmenistan
- Born: 28 November 1969 (age 56) Ýolöten, Mary Region, Turkmen SSR, USSR

Sport
- Sport: Wrestling

Rozy Akmämmedowiç Rejepow (born 28 November 1969) is a Turkmenistan wrestler. He competed in the men's Greco-Roman 90 kg at the 1996 Summer Olympics.
