= Miguel Robles (fencer) =

Bolivian fencer

Personal information
- Born: 22 October 1974 (age 51)

Sport
- Sport: Fencing

Miguel Robles (born 22 October 1974) is a Bolivian fencer. He competed in the individual sabre event at the 1996 Summer Olympics.
