= Peter Cox Jr. =

American fencer

Personal information
- Born: January 18, 1967 (age 59) Bronxville, New York, United States

Sport
- Sport: Fencing

Peter Cox Jr. (born January 18, 1967) is an American fencer. He competed in the individual and team sabre events at the 1996 Summer Olympics.
