= Vyacheslav Oliynyk =

Ukrainian wrestler (born 1966)

Medal record

Men's Greco-Roman wrestling

Representing Ukraine

Olympic Games
Gold medal – first place	1996 Atlanta	90 kg

World Championships
Silver medal – second place	1994 Istanbul	90 kg

European Championships
Gold medal – first place	1994 Athens	90 kg
Bronze medal – third place	1995 Besançon	90 kg
Bronze medal – third place	1996 Budapest	90 kg

Vyacheslav Oliynyk (Ukrainian: В'ячеслав Олійник; born April 27, 1966) is a former Ukrainian wrestler and Olympic champion. He won a gold medal at the 1996 Summer Olympics in Atlanta. He was born in Zhdanov, Ukrainian SSR, Soviet Union.
