= József Navarrete =

Hungarian fencer

Personal information
- Born: 26 December 1965 (age 60) Santa Clara, Cuba

Sport
- Sport: Fencing
Medal record
Men's fencing
Representing Hungary
Olympic Games
Silver medal – second place	1996 Atlanta	Sabre Team

József Navarrete (born 16 December 1965) is a Hungarian fencer, who won a silver medal in the team sabre competition at the 1996 Summer Olympics in Atlanta together with Bence Szabó and Csaba Köves.
