= Krzysztof Janczak =

Polish volleyball player (born 1974)

Personal information
- Nationality: Polish
- Born: 12 November 1974 (age 50); Wałbrzych, Poland

Sport
- Sport: Volleyball

Krzysztof Janczak (born 12 November 1974) is a Polish volleyball player. He competed in the men's tournament at the 1996 Summer Olympics.
