= Abdel Aziz Essafoui =

Moroccan wrestler

Personal information
- Nationality: Moroccan
- Born: 20 August 1970 (age 56)

Sport
- Sport: Wrestling

Abdel Aziz Essafoui (born 20 August 1970) is a Moroccan former wrestler. He competed in the men's Greco-Roman 90 kg at the 1996 Summer Olympics.
