= Raffaelo Caserta =

Italian fencer (born 1972)

Personal information
- Born: 15 August 1972 (age 53) Naples, Italy

Sport
- Sport: Fencing
Medal record
Men's fencing
Representing Italy
Olympic Games
Bronze medal – third place	1996 Atlanta	Sabre, team

Raffaelo Caserta (born 15 August 1972) is an Italian fencer. He won a bronze medal in the team sabre event at the 1996 Summer Olympics in Atlanta.
