= Iordanis Konstantinidis =

Greek wrestler

Personal information
- Nationality: Greek
- Born: 5 October 1972 (age 52); Ptolemaida, Greece

Sport
- Sport: Wrestling

Iordanis Konstantinidis (born 5 October 1972) is a Greek wrestler. He competed at the 1992 Summer Olympics and the 1996 Summer Olympics.
