= Zhao Chunsheng =

Chinese fencer

Personal information
- Born: 6 January 1977 (age 49)

Sport
- Sport: Fencing

Zhao Chunsheng (born 6 January 1977) is a Chinese fencer. He competed in the team épée and individual sabre events at the 2000 Summer Olympics.
