= Tonhi Terenzi =

Italian fencer (born 1969)

Personal information
- Born: 16 March 1969 (age 57) Genoa, Italy

Sport
- Sport: Fencing
- Club: Fiamme Oro
Medal record
Men's fencing
Representing Italy
Olympic Games
Bronze medal – third place	1996 Atlanta	Team sabre
World Championships
Gold medal – first place	1995 The Hague	Team sabre
Silver medal – second place	1993 Essen	Team sabre
Bronze medal – third place	1990 Lyon	Individual sabre
Bronze medal – third place	1993 Essen	Individual sabre
Bronze medal – third place	1995 The Hague	Individual sabre
Summer Universiade
Gold medal – first place	1993 Buffalo	Team sabre
Silver medal – second place	1989 Duisburg	Individual sabre
Silver medal – second place	1991 Sheffield	Team sabre
Bronze medal – third place	1989 Duisburg	Team sabre
Mediterranean Games
Silver medal – second place	1997 Bari	Individual sabre
Bronze medal – third place	1993 Languedoc	Individual sabre

Tonhi Terenzi (born 16 March 1969) is an Italian fencer. He won a bronze medal in the team sabre event at the 1996 Summer Olympics.
