= Igor Tsel =

Kazakhstani fencer (born 1977)

Personal information
- Born: 24 August 1977 (age 48) Karaganda, Kazakh SSR, Soviet Union

Sport
- Sport: Fencing

Igor Tsel (Игорь Геннадьевич Цель, born 24 August 1977) is a Kazakhstani fencer. He competed in the individual sabre event at the 2000 Summer Olympics.
