= Fernando Medina (fencer) =

Spanish fencer

Personal information
- Born: 3 April 1973 (age 53) Seville, Spain

Sport
- Sport: Fencing

Fernando Medina (born 3 April 1973) is a Spanish fencer. He competed in the sabre events at the 1996, 2000 and 2004 Summer Olympics. He won a bronze medal at the 1998 World Fencing Championships.
