= Lee Seung-won (fencer) =

South Korean fencer (born 1979)

Personal information
- Born: 15 April 1979 (age 47)

Sport
- Sport: Fencing

Lee Seung-won (born 15 April 1979) is a South Korean fencer. He competed in the individual sabre event at the 2000 Summer Olympics.
