= Masashi Nagara =

Japanese fencer

Personal information
- Born: 13 July 1977 (age 48) Gifu, Gifu, Japan

Sport
- Sport: Fencing

Masashi Nagara (長良 将司, Nagara Masashi; born 13 July 1977) is a Japanese fencer. He competed in the individual sabre events at the 2000 and 2004 Summer Olympics.
