= Rafał Sznajder =

Polish fencer (1972–2014)

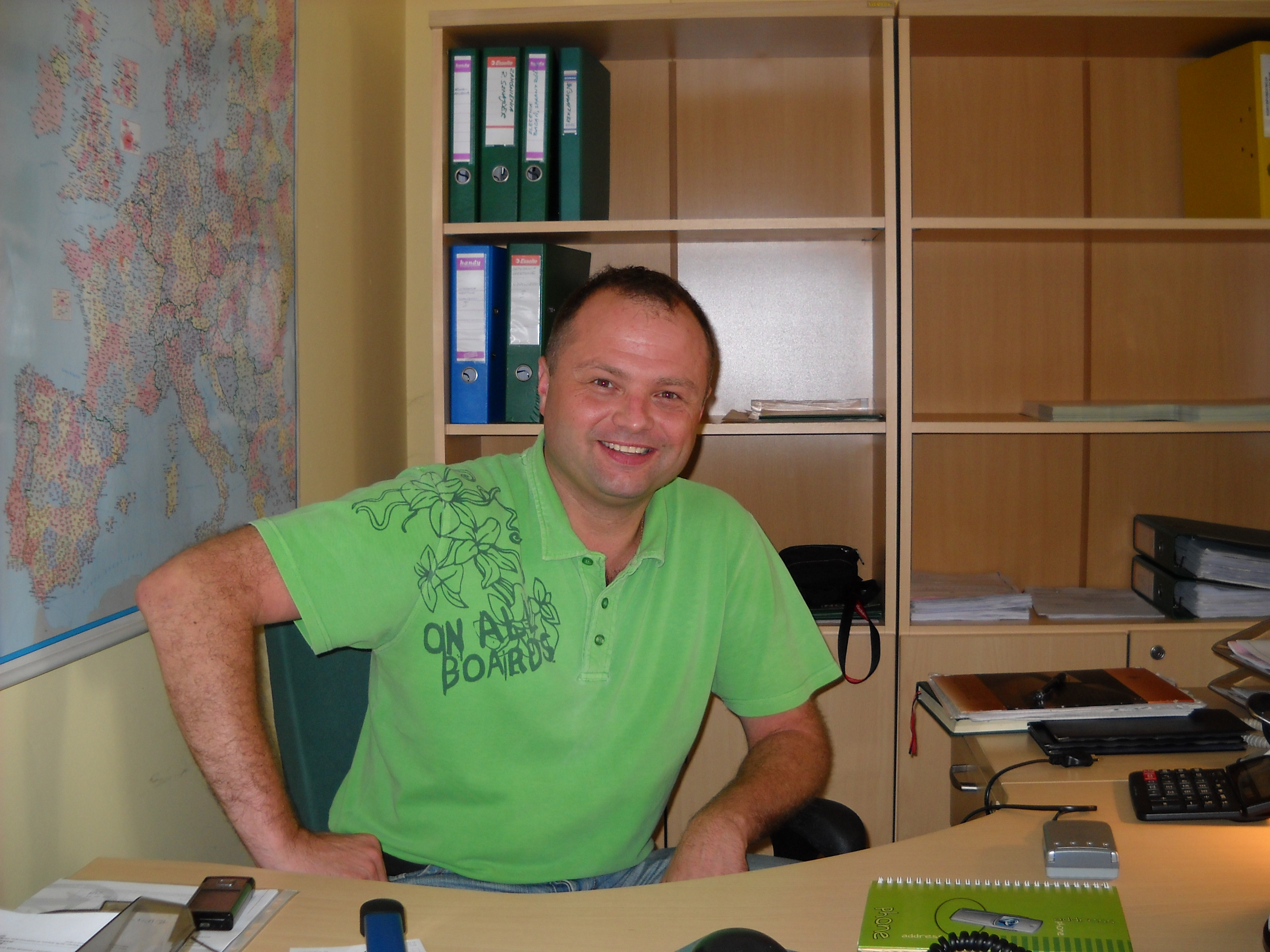

Personal information
- Born: 13 October 1972 Będzin, Poland
- Died: 13 April 2014 (aged 41) Plovdiv, Bulgaria

Fencing career
- Sport: Fencing
- Weapon: sabre
Medal record
Representing Poland
World Championships
Silver medal – second place	1999 Seoul	Team sabre
Bronze medal – third place	1997 Cape Town	Individual sabre
Bronze medal – third place	1998 La Chaux-de-Fonds	Team sabre
Bronze medal – third place	2011 Nîmes	Individual sabre
Summer Universiade
Bronze medal – third place	1993 Buffalo	Individual sabre

Rafał Jerzy Sznajder (13 October 1972 – 13 April 2014) was a Polish saber fencer. He competed in the three Summer Olympics: Atlanta 1996, Sydney 2000, and Athens 2004.

== Biography ==
Sznajder was born in Będzin, Śląskie, in Poland.

Sznajder won three individual Polish sabre titles (1998, 2001–02), and one team Polish sabre title (2003). He also won five silver medals and five bronze medals at the Polish national championships.

In 1998 in Plovdiv, Bulgaria, he was part of the Polish team that won the gold medal at the European Championships. Sznajder also won team silver medals at the European Championships in 2004–05.

He won individual bronze medals at the 1997 World Fencing Championships and 2001 World Fencing Championships. At the World Championships, Sznajder also won a team silver medal in 1999, and a team bronze medal in 1998.

He competed in the three Summer Olympics: Atlanta 1996, Sydney 2000, and Athens 2004.

After he retired as a fencer, Sznajder took and passed the international referee exams in all three fencing weapons. He officiated several senior World Cups, European Championships, the 2012 Summer Olympics, and the 2013 World Fencing Championships. He also served in the executive committee of the Polish Fencing Federation.

He died suddenly on 13 April 2014 at the end of the 2014 Junior and Cadet World Championships in Plovdiv.
