= Wang Jingzhi =

Chinese fencer

Personal information
- Born: 28 August 1982 (age 43) Tanggu, Tianjin, China

Sport
- Sport: Fencing

Wang Jingzhi (born 28 August 1982, in Tanggu, Tianjin) is a Chinese sabre fencer, who competed at the 2004, 2008 and 2012 Summer Olympics. His biggest accomplishment is winning a gold medal at the 2010 Asian Games.

He married fencer Tan Xue in 2009.

== See also ==
- China at the 2008 Summer Olympics
