= Norbert Jaskot =

Polish fencer

Personal information
- Born: 19 July 1971 (age 54) Poznań, Poland

Sport
- Sport: Fencing

Norbert Jaskot (born 19 July 1971) is a Polish fencer. He competed in the sabre events at the 1992, 1996 and 2000 Summer Olympics.
