= Florin Lupeică =

Romanian fencer

Florin Lupeica
Personal information
- Full name: Florin Lupeica
- Nickname: Loputkin
- Nationality: Romanian
- Born: 22 March 1973 (age 53) Iaşi, Romania
- Height: 1.85
- Weight: 85 kg (187 lb)

Sport
- Sport: Fencing
- Retired: 2010

Florin Alin Lupeică (born April 1972) is a Romanian fencer. He competed in the sabre events at the 1992, 1996 and 2000 Summer Olympics.
