= Wiradech Kothny =

Thai fencer (born 1979)

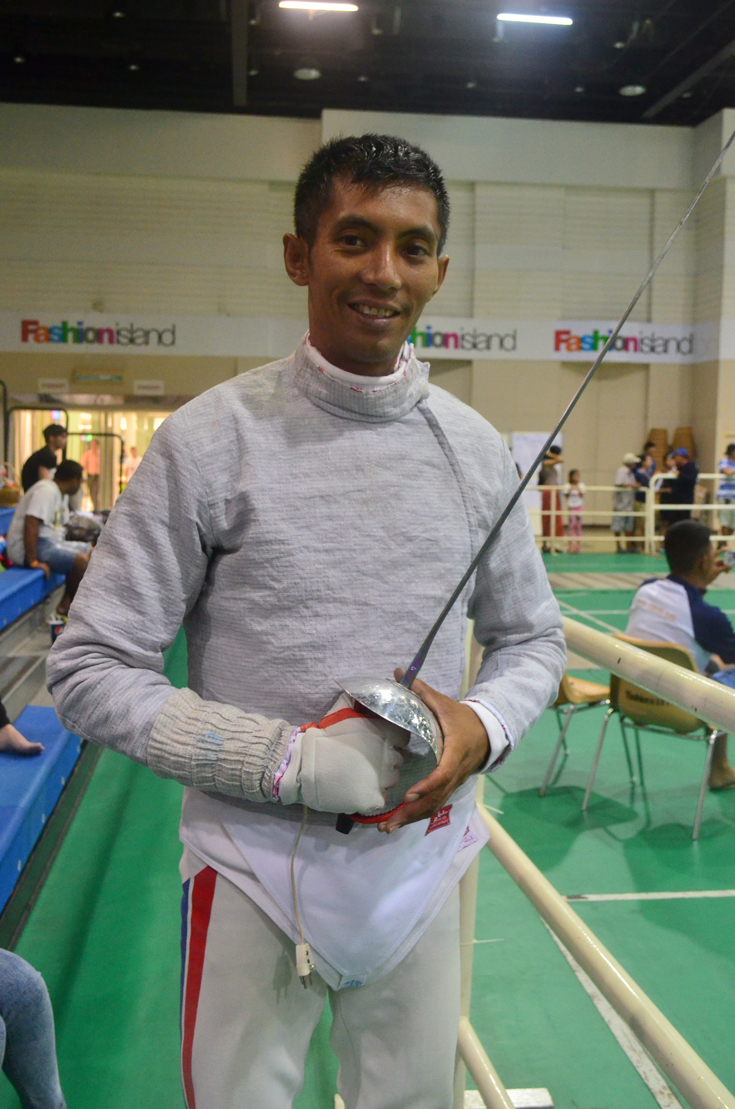
- Wiradech Kothny in Thailand Fencing Championship 2012

Personal information
- Born: 10 May 1979 (age 47) Kanchanaburi, Thailand

Sport
- Sport: Fencing
Medal record
Men's fencing
Representing Germany
Olympic Games
Bronze medal – third place	2000 Sydney	Sabre, individual
Bronze medal – third place	2000 Sydney	Sabre, team

Wiradech Kothny (Thai: วีระเดช โค๊ธนี, RTGS: Wiradet Khotni; born 10 May 1979) is a Thai former fencer. He won bronze medals in the individual and team sabre events at the 2000 Summer Olympics, competing for Germany. He then competed for Thailand at the 2004 and 2008 Summer Olympics.
