= Fencing at the 2000 Summer Olympics – Men's foil =

Fencing at the Olympics

Men's foil at the Games of the XXVII Olympiad
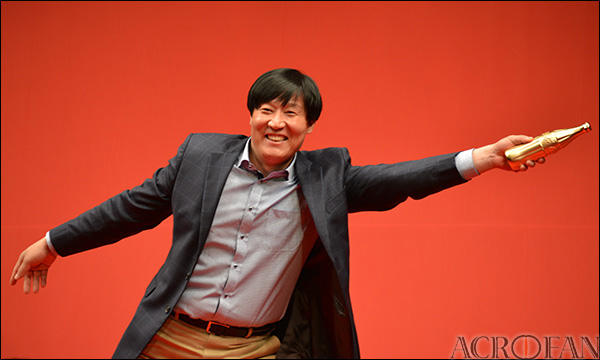
- Kim Young-ho
- Venue: Sydney Exhibition Centre
- Date: 20 September 2000
- Competitors: 40 from 22 nations

Medalists
1st place, gold medalist(s)		Kim Young-ho	South Korea
2nd place, silver medalist(s)		Ralf Bißdorf	Germany
3rd place, bronze medalist(s)		Dmitry Shevchenko	Russia

The men's foil was one of ten fencing events on the fencing at the 2000 Summer Olympics programme. It was the twenty-third appearance of the event. The competition was held on 20 September 2000. 40 fencers from 22 nations competed. Nations had been limited to three fencers each since 1928. The event was won by Kim Yeong-Ho of South Korea, the first Asian man to win an Olympic fencing title. Ralf Bißdorf of Germany took silver, the first medal for united Germany since 1928 (though East and West Germany had each won medals separately). Dmitry Shevchenko's bronze medal was Russia's first as an independent nation in the event.

== Background ==
This was the 23rd appearance of the event, which has been held at every Summer Olympics except 1908 (when there was a foil display only rather than a medal event). Four of the eight quarterfinalists from 1996 returned: silver medalist Lionel Plumenail of France, fourth-place finisher Wolfgang Wienand of Germany, fifth-place finisher Rolando Tucker of Cuba, sixth-place finisher (and 1992 silver medalist) Sergei Golubitsky of Ukraine, and eighth-place finisher Kim Young-ho of South Korea. Golubitsky was the favorite, having won all three world championships between Atlanta 1996 and Sydney 2000. Kim was a serious contender as well, rising from an unknown giant-killer (knocking off then-reigning world champion Dmitriy Shevchenko of Russia in the 1996 Games) to a giant himself (taking second in the 1997 and third in the 1999 world championships). Shevchenko returned as well, hoping for a better result than his early exit in Atlanta.

For the first time in the event's history, no nations made their debut in the men's foil. France and the United States each made their 21st appearance, tied for most of any nation; France had missed only the 1904 (with fencers not traveling to St. Louis) and the 1912 (boycotted due to a dispute over rules) foil competitions, while the United States had missed the inaugural 1896 competition and boycotted the 1980 Games altogether.

== Competition format ==
The 1996 tournament had vastly simplified the competition format into a single-elimination bracket, with a bronze medal match. The 2000 tournament continued to use that format. Bouts were to 15 touches. Standard foil rules regarding target area, striking, and priority were used.

== Schedule ==
All times are Australian Eastern Standard Time (UTC+10)

Date	Time	Round
Wednesday, 20 September 2000	9:30; 17:30	Round of 64; Round of 32; Round of 16; Quarterfinals; Semifinals; Bronze medal match Final

== Results ==
The field of 40 fencers competed in a single-elimination tournament to determine the medal winners. Semifinal losers proceeded to a bronze medal match.

=== Section 1 ===
Round of 64
Gerald McMahon (AUS)	9
Wang Haibin (CHN)	15
Naoto Okazaki (JPN)	6
Abdulmohsen Shahrayen (KUW)	15

Round of 32
Salvatore Sanzo (ITA)	15
Wang Haibin (CHN)	10
Ilgar Mamedov (RUS)	14
Carlos Rodríguez (VEN)	15
Elvis Gregory (CUB)	15
Abdulmohsen Shahrayen (KUW)	5
Dmitry Shevchenko (RUS)	15
Adam Krzesiński (POL)	8

Round of 16
Salvatore Sanzo (ITA)	15
Carlos Rodríguez (VEN)	7
Elvis Gregory (CUB)	14
Dmitry Shevchenko (RUS)	15

Quarterfinals
Salvatore Sanzo (ITA)	14
Dmitry Shevchenko (RUS)	15

=== Section 2 ===
Round of 64
James Beevers (GBR)	15
Marco Martins (BRA)	7
Brice Guyart (FRA)	15
Leandro Marchetti (ARG)	6

Round of 32
Serhiy Holubytskiy (UKR)	15
James Beevers (GBR)	1
Matteo Zennaro (ITA)	15
Daniele Crosta (ITA)	11
Kim Yeong-Ho (KOR)	15
Brice Guyart (FRA)	13
Cliff Bayer (USA)	15
Ryszard Sobczak (POL)	9

Round of 16
Serhiy Holubytskiy (UKR)	15
Matteo Zennaro (ITA)	12
Kim Yeong-Ho (KOR)	15
Cliff Bayer (USA)	14

Quarterfinals
Serhiy Holubytskiy (UKR)	5
Kim Yeong-Ho (KOR)	15

=== Section 3 ===
Round of 64
Lionel Plumenail (FRA)	15
Tamer Mohamed Tahoun (EGY)	9
Sławomir Mocek (POL)	15
Maher Ben Aziza (TUN)	2

Round of 32
Jean-Noël Ferrari (FRA)	15
Lionel Plumenail (FRA)	8
Rolando Tucker (CUB)	15
Joachim Wendt (AUT)	5
Oscar García (CUB)	9
Sławomir Mocek (POL)	15
Andrey Deyev (RUS)	10
Richard Breutner (GER)	15

Round of 16
Jean-Noël Ferrari (FRA)	15
Rolando Tucker (CUB)	13
Sławomir Mocek (POL)	8
Richard Breutner (GER)	15

Quarterfinals
Jean-Noël Ferrari (FRA)	15
Richard Breutner (GER)	9

=== Section 4 ===
Round of 64
Márk Marsi (HUN)	15
Andrey Kolganov (KAZ)	13
Oleksiy Kruhliak (UKR)	15
Oleksiy Bryzhalov (UKR)	9

Round of 32
Wolfgang Wienand (GER)	8
Márk Marsi (HUN)	15
Ye Chong (CHN)	15
Dong Zhaozhi (CHN)	6
João Gomes (POR)	15
Michael Ludwig (AUT)	12
Oleksiy Kruhliak (UKR)	7
Ralf Bißdorf (GER)	15

Round of 16
Márk Marsi (HUN)	15
Ye Chong (CHN)	8
João Gomes (POR)	11
Ralf Bißdorf (GER)	15

Quarterfinals
Márk Marsi (HUN)	13
Ralf Bißdorf (GER)	15

=== Finals ===
Semifinals
Dmitry Shevchenko (RUS)	14
Kim Yeong-Ho (KOR)	15
Jean-Noël Ferrari (FRA)	13
Ralf Bißdorf (GER)	15

Final
Kim Yeong-Ho (KOR)	15
Ralf Bißdorf (GER)	14
Bronze medal match
Dmitry Shevchenko (RUS)	15
Jean-Noël Ferrari (FRA)	14

== Final classification ==
Rank	Fencer	Nation
1st place, gold medalist(s)	Kim Yeong-Ho	South Korea
2nd place, silver medalist(s)	Ralf Bißdorf	Germany
3rd place, bronze medalist(s)	Dmitry Shevchenko	Russia
4	Jean-Noël Ferrari	France
5	Salvatore Sanzo	Italy
6	Serhiy Holubytskiy	Ukraine
7	Richard Breutner	Germany
8	Márk Marsi	Hungary
9	Elvis Gregory	Cuba
10	Cliff Bayer	United States
11	Matteo Zennaro	Italy
12	João Gomes	Portugal
13	Carlos Rodríguez	Venezuela
14	Rolando Tucker	Cuba
15	Ye Chong	China
16	Sławomir Mocek	Poland
17	Oscar García	Cuba
18	Wolfgang Wienand	Germany
19	Dong Zhaozhi	China
20	Joachim Wendt	Austria
21	Ilgar Mamedov	Russia
22	Michael Ludwig	Austria
23	Daniele Crosta	Italy
24	Ryszard Sobczak	Poland
25	Andrey Deyev	Russia
26	Adam Krzesiński	Poland
27	Brice Guyart	France
28	James Beevers	Great Britain
29	Lionel Plumenail	France
30	Wang Haibin	China
31	Oleksiy Kruhliak	Ukraine
32	Abdulmohsen Shahrayen	Kuwait
33	Naoto Okazaki	Japan
34	Oleksiy Bryzhalov	Ukraine
35	Gerald McMahon	Australia
36	Tamer Mohamed Tahoun	Egypt
37	Marco Martins	Brazil
38	Leandro Marchetti	Argentina
39	Maher Ben Aziza	Tunisia
40	Andrey Kolganov	Kazakhstan
