= Austria at the 1996 Summer Olympics =

- IOC code: AUT
- NOC: Austrian Olympic Committee
- Website: www.olympia.at (in German)

in Atlanta
- Competitors: 72 (56 men and 16 women) in 15 sports
- Flag bearer: Hubert Raudaschl
- Medals Ranked 57th: Gold 0 Silver 1 Bronze 2 Total 3

Summer Olympics appearances (overview)
- 1896; 1900; ~~1904~~; 1908; 1912; 1920; 1924; 1928; 1932; 1936; 1948; 1952; 1956; 1960; 1964; 1968; 1972; 1976; 1980; 1984; 1988; 1992; 1996; 2000; 2004; 2008; 2012; 2016; 2020; 2024; 2028

Other related appearances
- 1906 Intercalated Games

Austria was represented at the 1996 Summer Olympics in Atlanta, Georgia, United States by the Austrian Olympic Committee.

In total, 72 athletes including 56 men and 16 woman represented Austria in 15 different sports including athletics, badminton, canoeing, cycling, diving, equestrian, fencing, judo, rhythmic gymnastics, rowing, sailing, shooting, swimming, table tennis and tennis.

Austria won three medals at the games after Wolfram Waibel Jr. claimed silver in the men's 10 m air rifle and bronze in the men's 50 m rifle three positions and Theresia Kiesl claimed bronze in the women's 1,500 m.

== Competitors ==
In total, 72 athletes represented Austria at the 1996 Summer Olympics in Atlanta, Georgia, United States across 15 different sports.

Sport	Men	Women	Total
Athletics	9	3	12
Badminton	1	0	1
Canoeing	2	1	3
Cycling	8	1	9
Diving	1	1	2
Equestrian	4	1	5
Fencing	3	0	3
Gymnastics	0	2	2
Judo	4	1	5
Rowing	11	2	13
Sailing	6	0	6
Shooting	3	0	3
Swimming	0	4	4
Table tennis	4	0	4
Tennis	0	1	1
Total	56	16	72

== Medalists ==
Austria won three medals at the games after Wolfram Waibel Jr. claimed a silver and a bronze and Theresia Kiesl also won bronze.

Medal	Name	Sport	Event
Silver	Wolfram Waibel	Shooting	Men's 10 m air rifle
Bronze	Wolfram Waibel	Shooting	Men's 50 m rifle three positions
Bronze	Theresia Kiesl	Athletics	Women's 1,500 m

== Athletics ==
In total, 12 Austrian athletes participated in the athletics events – Thomas Ebner, Werner Edler-Muhr, Thomas Griesser, Theresia Kiesl, Sigrid Kirchmann, Martin Lachkovics, Elmar Lichtenegger, Mark McKoy, Lyudmila Ninova, Christoph Pöstinger, Herwig Röttl and Martin Schützenauer.

Key

- Note–Ranks given for track events are within the athlete's heat only
- Q = Qualified for the next round

Men
Track & road events

Athlete	Event	Heat		Quarterfinal		Semifinal		Final	
Athlete	Event	Result	Rank	Result	Rank	Result	Rank	Result	Rank
Christoph Pöstinger	200 m	20.98	5	—N/a		Did not advance			
Thomas Griesser	200 m	21.20	6	Did not advance					
Werner Edler-Muhr	1,500 m	3:45.02	8	Did not advance					
Thomas Ebner	1,500 m	3:48.38	10	—N/a		Did not advance			
Mark McKoy	110 m hurdles	13.70	2 Q	13.64	5	Did not advance			
Elmar Lichtenegger	110 m hurdles	14.03	6	Did not advance					
Herwig Röttl	110 m hurdles	14.08	7	Did not advance					
Martin Schützenauer; Martin Lachkovics; Thomas Griesser; Christoph Pöstinger	4 × 100 m relay	39.80	4	—N/a		did not advance			

Women
Track & road events

Athlete	Event	Heat		Quarterfinal		Semifinal		Final	
Athlete	Event	Result	Rank	Result	Rank	Result	Rank	Result	Rank
Theresia Kiesl	1,500 m	4:09.24	1 Q	4:09.44	1 Q	—N/a		4:03.02	3rd place, bronze medalist(s)

Field events

Athlete	Event	Qualification		Final	
Athlete	Event	Distance	Position	Distance	Position
Lyudmila Ninova	Long Jump	NM		Did not advance	
Sigrid Kirchmann	High Jump	Did not start			

== Badminton ==
In total, one Austrian athlete participated in the badminton events – Hannes Fuchs in the men's singles.

Athlete	Event	Round of 64	Round of 32	Round of 16	Quarterfinal	Semifinal	Final / BM	
Athlete	Event	Opposition Score	Opposition Score	Opposition Score	Opposition Score	Opposition Score	Opposition Score	Rank
Hannes Fuchs	Men's singles	Bye	Robertson (GBR); W (15–2, 15–6)	Stuer-Lauridsen (DEN); L (2-15, 5–15)	Did not advance			

== Canoeing ==
In total, three Austrian athletes participated in the canoeing events – Manuel Köhler and Helmut Oblinger in the men's C-1 and Ursula Profanter in the women's K-1 500 m.

Slalom

Athlete	Event	Run 1		Run 2		Best	
Athlete	Event	Time	Rank	Time	Rank	Time	Rank
Helmut Oblinger	Men's C-1	159.22	20	157.06	19	157.06	28
Manuel Köhler	Men's C-1	261.01	43	209.54	36	209.54	42

Sprint

Athlete	Event	Heat		Repechage		Semifinal		Final	
Athlete	Event	Time	Rank	Time	Rank	Time	Rank	Time	Rank
Ursula Profanter	Women's K-1 500 m	1:51.440	1	Bye		1:50.066	3	1:50.271	6

== Cycling ==
In total, nine Austrian athletes participated in the cycling events – Ernst Denifl in the men's cross-country, Tanja Klein in the women's road race, women's time trial and the Women's points race, Christian Meidlinger in the men's 1 km time trial, Harald Morscher, Peter Luttenberger, Werner Riebenbauer, Georg Totschnig and Peter Wrolich in the men's road race and Franz Stocher in the men's points race.

Road

Athlete	Event	Time	Rank
Peter Luttenberger	Men's road race	4:56:50	81
Harald Morscher	Men's road race	4:55:45	46
Werner Riebenbauer	Men's road race	4:56:45	44
Georg Totschnig	Men's road race	4:56:47	61
Peter Wrolich	Men's road race	4:55:46	54
Tanja Klein	Women's road race	2:37:06	22
Tanja Klein	Women's time trial	42:03	23

Track

Athlete	Event	Time	Rank
Christian Meidlinger	Men's 1 km time trial	1:05.530	9

Athlete	Event	Points	Rank
Franz Stocher	Men's points race	5	12
Tanja Klein	Women's points race	0	16

Mountain bike

Athlete	Event	Time	Rank
Ernst Denifl	Men's cross-country	2:45:34	28

== Diving ==
In total, two Austrian athletes participated in the diving events – Richard Frece in the men's 3 m springboard and the men's 10 m platform and Anja Richter in the women's 10 m platform.

Athlete	Event	Preliminary		Semifinal				Final			
Athlete	Event	Points	Rank	Points	Rank	Total	Rank	Points	Rank	Total	Rank
Richard Frece	Men's 3 m springboard	365.73	10	197.91	17	563.64	14	Did not advance			
Richard Frece	Men's 10 m platform	373.41	12	148.35	17	521.76	12	355.29	11	503.64	12
Anja Richter	Women's 10 m platform	266.13	10	160.83	10	426.96	10	247.62	11	408.45	11

== Equestrian ==
In total, five Austrian athletes participated in the equestrian events – Caroline Hatlapa in the individual dressage and Anton-Martin Bauer, Thomas Metzger, Helmut Morbitzer and Hugo Simon in the individual jumping and the team jumping.

Dressage

Athlete	Horse	Event	Grand Prix Test		Grand Prix Special				Grand Prix Freestyle			
Athlete	Horse	Event	Points	Rank	Points	Rank	Total	Rank	Points	Rank	Total	Rank
Caroline Hatlapa	Merlin	Individual	64.36	31	Did not advance							

Jumping

Athlete	Horse	Event	Qualifying										Final		
Athlete	Horse	Event	Round 1		Round 2				Round 3				Final		
Athlete	Horse	Event	Penalties	Rank	Penalties	Rank	Total	Rank	Penalties	Rank	Total	Rank	Penalties	Jump-off	Rank
Anton-Martin Bauer	Vesuve Paluelle	Individual	4.00	=14	0.00	=1	4.00		8.00	=31	12.00	=9	8.00	—N/a	=11
Thomas Metzger	Royal Flash	Individual	DNF		Did not advance										
Helmut Morbitzer	Racal	Individual	0.00	=1	16.00	=57	16.00		4.00	=14	20.00	=29	29.00	—N/a	25
Hugo Simon	ET	Individual	4.00	=14	4.00	=11	8.00		8.00	=31	16.00	=16	4.00	4.00	4
Anton-Martin Bauer; Thomas Metzger; Helmut Morbitzer; Hugo Simon	See above	Team	—N/a		20.00	=9	—N/a		20.00	=11	20.00	=11	—N/a		

== Fencing ==
In total, three Austrian athletes participated in the fencing events – Marco Falchetto, Michael Ludwig and Joachim Wendt in the men's individual foil and the men's team foil.

Athlete	Event	Round of 64	Round of 32	Round of 16	Quarterfinal	Semifinal	Final / BM	
Athlete	Event	Opposition Result	Opposition Result	Opposition Result	Opposition Result	Opposition Result	Opposition Result	Rank
Joachim Wendt	Individual foil	—N/a	Römer (GER); L 7–15	Did not advance				23
Michael Ludwig	Individual foil	Rodríguez (VEN); W 15–11	Plumenail (FRA); L 12–15	Did not advance				26
Marco Falchetto	Individual foil	Marchetti (ARG); L 13–15	Did not advance					33
Joachim Wendt; Michael Ludwig; Marco Falchetto	Team foil	—N/a		United States; W 45–32	Italy; W 45–36	Poland; L 36–45	Cuba; L 28–45	4

== Gymnastics ==
In total, two Austrian athletes participated in the gymnastic events – Birgit Schielin and Nina Taborsky in the women's rhythmic individual all-around.

Athlete	Event	Preliminaries						Semifinals						Final					
Athlete	Event	Rope	Ball	Clubs	Ribbon	Total	Rank	Rope	Ball	Clubs	Ribbon	Total	Rank	Rope	Ball	Clubs	Ribbon	Total	Rank
Birgit Schielin	Individual	9.200	9.166	9.266	9.249	36.881	24	Did not advance											
Nina Taborsky	Individual	9.133	9.183	9.083	9.166	36.566	29	Did not advance											

== Judo ==
In total, five Austrian athletes participated in the judo events – Sergei Klischin in the men's –86 kg category, Eric Krieger in the +95 kg category, Patrick Reiter in the men's –78 kg category, Thomas Schleicher in the men's –71 kg category and Mariela Spacek in the women's –66 kg category.

Men

Athlete	Event	Round of 64	Round of 32	Round of 16	Quarterfinal	Semifinal	Repechage 1	Repechage 2	Repechage 3	Final / BM	
Athlete	Event	Opposition Result	Opposition Result	Opposition Result	Opposition Result	Opposition Result	Opposition Result	Opposition Result	Opposition Result	Opposition Result	Rank
Thomas Schleicher	–71 kg	Bye	Nakamura (JPN); L	Did not advance			Harkat (ALG); W	Schmidt (GER); L	Did not advance		=9
Patrick Reiter	–78 kg	Shmakov (UZB); L	Did not advance								=33
Sergei Klischin	–86 kg	Bye	Wilkinson (AUS); L	Did not advance							=21
Eric Krieger	+95 kg	Bye	Larbi (ALG); W	Rakhimov (TJK); W	Douillet (FRA); L	Did not advance	Bye	Van Barneveld (BEL); L	Did not advance		=9

Women

Athlete	Event	Round of 32	Round of 16	Quarterfinal	Semifinal	Repechage 1	Repechage 2	Repechage 3	Final / BM	
Athlete	Event	Opposition Result	Opposition Result	Opposition Result	Opposition Result	Opposition Result	Opposition Result	Opposition Result	Opposition Result	Rank
Mariela Spacek	–66 kg	Bye	Kotelnikova (RUS); W	Dubois (FRA); L	Did not advance	Bye	Revé (CUB); L	Did not advance		=9

== Rowing ==
In total, 13 Austrian athletes participated in the rowing events – Hermann Bauer and Andreas Nader in the men's coxless pair, Gernot Faderbauer, Harald Hofmann, Martin Kobau and Christoph Schmölzer in the men's lightweight coxless four, Monika Felizeter and Karola Schustereder in the women's lightweight double sculls, Arnold Jonke and Christoph Zerbst in the men's double sculls, Horst Nußbaumer in the men's single sculls, Walter Rantasa, Wolfgang Sigl in the men's lightweight double sculls.

Athlete(s)	Event	Heats		Repechage		Semifinals		Final	
Athlete(s)	Event	Time	Rank	Time	Rank	Time	Rank	Time	Rank
Horst Nußbaumer	Men's single sculls	7:36.15	3 R	7:49.79	2 SAB	7:35.52	6 FB	6:53.20	9
Andreas Nader; Hermann Bauer	Men's coxless pair	6:46.18	6 R	7:03.86	2 SAB	6:57.44	4 FB	6:38.60	11
Arnold Jonke; Christoph Zerbst	Men's double sculls	6:56.55	4 R	6:43.52	1 SAB	6:35.76	2 FA	6:25.17	5
Wolfgang Sigl; Walter Rantasa	Men's lightweight double sculls	6:54.36	2 R	6:21.10	1 Q	6:28.06	3 FA	6:30.85	5
Martin Kobau; Harald Hofmann; Christoph Schmölzer; Gernot Faderbauer	Men's lightweight coxless four	6:24.59	3 R	6:02.76	3 Q	6:22.60	6 FB	6:06.09	12
Karola Schustereder; Monika Felizeter	Women's lightweight double sculls	7:45.45	4 R	7:07.34	3 Q	7:32.07	6 FB	7:11.22	11

== Sailing ==
In total, six Austrian athletes participated in the sailing events – Andreas Hagara and Florian Schneeberger in the tornado, Andreas Hanakamp and Hubert Raudaschl in the star, Hans Spitzauer in the finn and Franz Urlesberger in the laser.

Men

Athlete	Event	Race										Net points	Final rank
Athlete	Event	1	2	3	4	5	6	7	8	9	10	Net points	Final rank
Hans Spitzauer	Finn	4	1	10	7	11	4	5	~~PMS~~	~~12~~	12	54.0	4

Open

Athlete	Event	Race											Net points	Final rank
Athlete	Event	1	2	3	4	5	6	7	8	9	10	11	Net points	Final rank
Franz Urlesberger	Laser	19	~~30~~	15	16	16	~~23~~	14	12	6	9	15	122.0	14
Andreas Hagara; Florian Schneeberger	Tornado	4	3	5	6	1	7	10	~~13~~	7	13	1	44.0	4
Hubert Raudaschl; Andreas Hanakamp	Star	12	12	13	19	13	5	13	~~20~~	13	8	—N/a	89.0	15

== Shooting ==
In total, three Austrian athletes participated in the shooting events – Thomas Farnik, Dieter Grabner and Wolfram Waibel Jr.

Men

Athlete	Event	Qualification		Final	
Athlete	Event	Score	Rank	Score	Rank
Thomas Farnik	50 m rifle three positions	1164	13	Did not advance	
Thomas Farnik	50 m rifle prone	589	42	Did not advance	
Dieter Grabner	10 m air rifle	588	18	Did not advance	
Wolfram Waibel Jr.	50 m rifle three positions	1170	4 Q	1269.6	3rd place, bronze medalist(s)
Wolfram Waibel Jr.	50 m rifle prone	590	39	Did not advance	
Wolfram Waibel Jr.	10 m air rifle	596	1 Q	695.2	2nd place, silver medalist(s)

== Swimming ==
In total, four Austrian athletes participated in the swimming events – Judith Draxler in the women's 50 m freestyle and the women's 100 m freestyle, Elvira Fischer in the women's 200 m breaststroke, Martina Nemec in the women's 400 m freestyle, women's 200 m individual medley and the women's 400 m individual medley and Vera Lischka in the women's 100 m breaststroke.

Athlete	Event	Heat		Final	
Athlete	Event	Time	Rank	Time	Rank
Judith Draxler	50 m freestyle	26.34	=20	Did not advance	
Judith Draxler	100 m freestyle	57.34 NR	27	Did not advance	
Martina Nemec	400 m freestyle	4:23.72	32	Did not advance	
Martina Nemec	200 m individual medley	2:21.10	30	Did not advance	
Martina Nemec	400 m individual medley	5:02.52	30	Did not advance	
Vera Lischka	100 m breaststroke	1:09.68 NR	5 FA	1:09.24 NR	5
Elvira Fischer	200 m breaststroke	2:33.89	=24	Did not advance	

Key: FA - Qualify to A final (medal)

== Table tennis ==
In total, four Austrian athletes participated in the table tennis events – Karl Jindrak, Qian Qianli, Werner Schlager and Ding Yi.

Athlete	Event	Group stage				Round of 16	Quarterfinal	Semifinal	Final / BM	
Athlete	Event	Opposition Result	Opposition Result	Opposition Result	Rank	Opposition Result	Opposition Result	Opposition Result	Opposition Result	Rank
Ding Yi	Men's singles	Kim (KOR); L 0–2	Németh (HUN); L 1–2	Langley (AUS); W 2–1	3	Did not advance				
Werner Schlager	Men's singles	Primorac (CRO); L 0–2	Bátorfi (HUN); W 2-0	Al-Hammadi (QAT); W 2-0	2	Did not advance				
Ding Yi; Qian Qianli	Men's doubles	Lü / Wang (CHN); L 0–2	Atiković / Primorac (CRO); W 2-0	Langley / Lavale (AUS); W 2-0	3	—N/a	Did not advance			
Karl Jindrak; Werner Schlager	Men's doubles	Fetzner / Roßkopf (GER); L 0–2	Huang / Ng (CAN); W 2-0	Hoyama / Peixoto (BRA); W 2-1	2	—N/a	Did not advance			

== Tennis ==
In total, one Austrian athletes participated in the tennis events – Judith Wiesner in the women's singles.

Athlete	Event	Round of 64	Round of 32	Round of 16	Quarterfinal	Semifinal	Final / BM	
Athlete	Event	Opposition Result	Opposition Result	Opposition Result	Opposition Result	Opposition Result	Opposition Result	Rank
Judith Wiesner	Women's singles	Temesvári (HUN); W 7–6, 6–4	Novotná (CZE); L 4–6, 6–3, 3-6	Did not advance				
