= Italy at the 2000 Summer Olympics =

- IOC code: ITA
- NOC: Italian National Olympic Committee
- Website: www.coni.it (in Italian)

in Sydney
- Competitors: 361 (246 men, 115 women) in 29 sports
- Flag bearer: Carlton Myers
- Medals Ranked 7th: Gold 13 Silver 8 Bronze 13 Total 34

Summer Olympics appearances (overview)
- 1896; 1900; 1904; 1908; 1912; 1920; 1924; 1928; 1932; 1936; 1948; 1952; 1956; 1960; 1964; 1968; 1972; 1976; 1980; 1984; 1988; 1992; 1996; 2000; 2004; 2008; 2012; 2016; 2020; 2024

Other related appearances
- 1906 Intercalated Games

Italy competed at the 2000 Summer Olympics in Sydney, Australia. 361 competitors, 246 men and 115 women, took part in 175 events in 29 sports.

== Medalists ==
Medal	Name	Sport	Event	Date
Gold	Beniamino Bonomi, Antonio Rossi	Canoeing	Men's K-2 1000 m	30 September
Gold	Josefa Idem	Canoeing	Women's K-1 500 m	1 October
Gold	Paola Pezzo	Cycling	Women's cross-country	23 September
Gold	Antonella Bellutti	Cycling	Women's points race	21 September
Gold	Angelo Mazzoni, Paolo Milanoli, Maurizio Randazzo, Alfredo Rota	Fencing	Men's team épée	18 September
Gold	Valentina Vezzali	Fencing	Women's foil	21 September
Gold	Diana Bianchedi, Giovanna Trillini, Valentina Vezzali	Fencing	Women's team foil	23 September
Gold	Giuseppe Maddaloni	Judo	Men's 73 kg	18 September
Gold	Agostino Abbagnale, Rossano Galtarossa, Simone Raineri, Alessio Sartori	Rowing	Men's quadruple sculls	24 September
Gold	Alessandra Sensini	Sailing	Women's Mistral	24 September
Gold	Domenico Fioravanti	Swimming	Men's 100 m breaststroke	17 September
Gold	Domenico Fioravanti	Swimming	Men's 200 m breaststroke	20 September
Gold	Massimiliano Rosolino	Swimming	Men's 200 m individual medley	21 September
Silver	Matteo Bisiani, Ilario Di Buò, Michele Frangilli	Archery	Men's team	22 September
Silver	Nicola Vizzoni	Athletics	Men's hammer throw	24 September
Silver	Fiona May	Athletics	Women's long jump	29 September
Silver	Elia Luini, Leonardo Pettinari	Rowing	Men's lightweight double sculls	24 September
Silver	Lorenzo Carboncini, Riccardo Dei Rossi, Valter Molea, Carlo Mornati	Rowing	Men's coxless four	23 September
Silver	Luca Devoti	Sailing	Finn	30 September
Silver	Deborah Gelisio	Shooting	Women's double trap	19 September
Silver	Massimiliano Rosolino	Swimming	Men's 400 m freestyle	16 September
Bronze	Paolo Vidoz	Boxing	Super Heavyweight	29 September
Bronze	Pierpaolo Ferrazzi	Canoeing	Men's slalom K-1	20 September
Bronze	Silvio Martinello, Marco Villa	Cycling	Men's Madison	21 September
Bronze	Giovanna Trillini	Fencing	Women's foil	21 September
Bronze	Daniele Crosta, Gabriele Magni, Salvatore Sanzo, Matteo Zennaro	Fencing	Men's team foil	22 September
Bronze	Girolamo Giovinazzo	Judo	Men's 66 kg	17 September
Bronze	Ylenia Scapin	Judo	Women's 70 kg	18 September
Bronze	Emanuela Pierantozzi	Judo	Women's 78 kg	21 September
Bronze	Giovanni Calabrese, Nicola Sartori	Rowing	Men's double sculls	23 September
Bronze	Giovanni Pellielo	Shooting	Men's trap	17 September
Bronze	Massimiliano Rosolino	Swimming	Men's 200 m freestyle	18 September
Bronze	Davide Rummolo	Swimming	Men's 200 m breaststroke	20 September
Bronze	Italy men's national volleyball team: Marco Bracci; Mirko Corsano; Alessandro Fei; Andrea Gardini; Andrea Giani; Pasquale Gravina; Luigi Mastrangelo; Marco Meoni; Samuele Papi; Simone Rosalba; Andrea Sartoretti; Paolo Tofoli	Volleyball	Men's tournament	1 October

== Archery ==
The men's team, which returned two members of the bronze medal-winning 1996 squad, did even better in 2000. They defeated the United States in the semifinal to guarantee themselves at least a silver medal. The Korean men, however, ensured that the Italians did not win the gold medal by defeating them in the final.

Men

Athlete	Event	Ranking round		Round of 64	Round of 32	Round of 16	Quarterfinals	Semifinals	Final / BM	
Athlete	Event	Score	Seed	Opposition Score	Opposition Score	Opposition Score	Opposition Score	Opposition Score	Opposition Score	Rank
Matteo Bisiani	Men's individual	634	18	Grov (NOR); W 166–158	Makiyama (JPN); L 159–162	Did not advance				
Ilario Di Buò	Men's individual	627	30	Hamano (JPN); W 163–158	Kim C-t (KOR); L 159–162	Did not advance				
Michele Frangilli	Men's individual	634	19	Humlekjær (NOR); W 168–158	Hunter-Russell (AUS); W 164–154	Kim C-t (KOR); L 108–169	Did not advance			
Matteo Bisiani; Ilario Di Buò; Michele Frangilli	Men's team	1895	6	—N/a		France; W 250–239	Kazakhstan; W 249–244	United States; W 244–241	South Korea; L 247–255	2nd place, silver medalist(s)

Women

Athlete	Event	Ranking round		Round of 64	Round of 32	Round of 16	Quarterfinals	Semifinals	Final / BM	
Athlete	Event	Score	Seed	Opposition Score	Opposition Score	Opposition Score	Opposition Score	Opposition Score	Opposition Score	Rank
Irene Franchini	Women's individual	611	55	Serdyuk (UKR); L 157–144	Did not advance					
Cristina Ioriatti	Women's individual	618	47	Borresen (RSA); W 154–145	Hamdiah (INA); W 156 (7) – 156 (6)	Valeeva (ITA); L 156–163	Did not advance			
Natalia Valeeva	Women's individual	667	2	Youanga (CAF); W 166–126	Larsson (SWE); W 162–160	Ioriatti (ITA); W 163–156	Choe (PRK); L 103–107	Did not advance		
Irene Franchini; Cristina Ioriatti; Natalia Valeeva	Women's team	1896	7	—N/a		Australia; W 237–236	Ukraine; L 230–237	Did not advance		

== Athletics ==
=== Men's track ===
Athlete	Event	Heat		Quarterfinal		Semifinal		Final	
Athlete	Event	Result	Rank	Result	Rank	Result	Rank	Result	Rank
Andrea Colombo	100m	10.52	4	Did not advance					
Francesco Scuderi	100m	10.50	6	Did not advance					
Stefano Tilli	100m	10.40	4 q	10.27	6	Did not advance			
Alessandro Cavallaro	200m	20.58	3 Q	20.95	6	Did not advance			
Alessandro Attene	400m	45.79	3 Q	45.35	3 Q	46.41	7	Did not advance	
Andrea Longo	800m	1:46.32	1 Q	—N/a		1:44.49	2 Q	DSQ	
Rachid Berradi	10000m	28:01.18	12 q	—N/a				28:45.96	17
Daniele Caimmi	10000m	29:01.26	15	Did not advance					
Andrea Giaconi	110m hurdles	13.62	3 Q	13.93	7	Did not advance			
Emiliano Pizzoli	110m hurdles	13.65	4 Q	13.69	5	Did not advance			
Giorgio Frinolli Puzzilli	400m hurdles	50.27	2 Q	—N/a		50.10	8	Did not advance	
Fabrizio Mori	400m hurdles	49.35	1 Q	—N/a		48.40	2 Q	48.78	7
Giuseppe Maffei	3000m steeplechase	8:48.88	12	Did not advance					
Stefano Baldini	Marathon	—N/a						DNF	
Giacomo Leone	Marathon	—N/a						2:12:14	5
Vincenzo Modica	Marathon	—N/a						DNF	
Giovanni de Benedictis	20km walk	—N/a						1:23:14	16
Michele Didoni	20km walk	—N/a						1:21:43	12
Alessandro Gandellini	20km walk	—N/a						1:21:14	9
Ivano Brugnetti	50km walk	—N/a						DNF	
Arturo Di Mezza	50km walk	—N/a						DNF	
Giovanni Perricelli	50km walk	—N/a						DNF	
Alessandro Cavallaro; Maurizio Checcucci; Andrea Colombo; Francesco Scuderi	4 × 100 m relay	38.84	2 Q	—N/a		38.67	4 q	38.67	7

=== Men's field ===
Athlete	Event	Qualification		Final	
Athlete	Event	Distance	Position	Distance	Position
Diego Fortuna	Discus throw	62.26	14	Did not advance	
Loris Paoluzzi	Hammer throw	76.91	9 q	78.18	6
Nicola Vizzoni	Hammer throw	77.56	5 Q	79.64	2nd place, silver medalist(s)
Giuseppe Gibilisco	Pole vault	5.70	6 Q	5.50	10
Paolo Dal Soglio	Shot put	19.39	19	Did not advance	
Paolo Camossi	Triple jump	16.87	11 q	16.96	8
Fabrizio Donato	Triple jump	16.34	25	Did not advance	

=== Women's track ===
Athlete	Event	Heat		Quarterfinal		Semifinal		Final	
Athlete	Event	Result	Rank	Result	Rank	Result	Rank	Result	Rank
Manuela Levorato	200m	DNS		Did not advance					
Roberta Brunet	5000m	15:27.32	6	Did not advance					
Silvia Sommaggio	10000m	33:24.13	13	Did not advance					
Monika Niederstatter	400m hurdles	58.02	5	Did not advance					
Ornella Ferrara	Marathon	—N/a						2:31:32	18
Maura Viceconte	Marathon	—N/a						2:29:26	12
Erica Alfridi	20km walk	—N/a						1:31:25	4
Elisabetta Perrone	20km walk	—N/a						DSQ	
Annarita Sidoti	20km walk	—N/a						DNF	
Francesca Carbone; Virna De Angeli; Daniela Graglia; Fabiola Piroddi	4 × 400 m relay	3:27.23	4	Did not advance					

=== Women's field ===
Athlete	Event	Qualification		Final	
Athlete	Event	Distance	Position	Distance	Position
Ester Balassini	Hammer throw	NM		Did not advance	
Claudia Coslovich	Javelin throw	60.12	10 q	56.74	12
Mara Rosolen	Shot put	16.66	19	Did not advance	
Fiona May	Long jump	6.81	2 Q	6.92	2nd place, silver medalist(s)

=== Combined events ===
Women's heptathlon

Athlete	Event	100H	HJ	SP	200 m	LJ	JT	800 m	Final	Rank
Gertrud Bacher	Result	13.82	1.75	12.75	24.96	5.84	41.14	2:09.08	5989	14
Gertrud Bacher	Points	1004	916	711	890	801	689	978	5989	14

== Baseball ==
Italy was one of the four nations for which the third Olympic baseball tournament continued their streak of unbroken appearances. The Italians went 2–5 in the preliminary round, defeating the Netherlands and South Africa. This put them in sixth place and eliminated them from competition.

Team	Event	Group stage								Semifinal	Final / BM	
Team	Event	Opposition Score	Opposition Score	Opposition Score	Opposition Score	Opposition Score	Opposition Score	Opposition Score	Rank	Opposition Score	Opposition Score	Rank
Italy men's	Men's tournament	South Korea; L 2-10	Cuba; L 5-13	South Africa; W 13–0	Japan; L 1–6	United States; L 2–4	Australia; W 8–7	Netherlands; L 2–3	6	Did not advance		

== Basketball ==
=== Men's ===
Team roster

- Alessandro Abbio
- Gianluca Basile
- Roberto Chiacig
- Marcelo Dilglay Damiao
- Gregor Fučka
- Giacomo Galanda
- Agostino Antonio Li Vecchi
- Denis Marconato
- Andrea Meneghin
- Michele Mian
- Carlton Myers
- German Claudio Scarone

Team	Event	Group stage						Quarterfinal	Semifinal	Final / BM	
Team	Event	Opposition Score	Opposition Score	Opposition Score	Opposition Score	Opposition Score	Rank	Opposition Score	Opposition Score	Opposition Score	Rank
Italy men's	Men's tournament	Lithuania; W 50–48	United States; L 61–93	New Zealand; W 78–66	France; W 67–57	China; L 85–76	2	Australia; L 62–65	—N/a	5/6th classification match FR Yugoslavia; W 69–59	5

== Beach volleyball ==
Athlete	Event	Preliminary round	Preliminary elimination	Round of 16	Quarterfinals	Semifinals	Final	
Athlete	Event	Opposition Score	Opposition Score	Opposition Score	Opposition Score	Opposition Score	Opposition Score	Rank
Maurizio Pimponi; Andrea Raffaelli	Men's	Conde – Martinez (ARG); L 15–7	Berger – Stamm (AUT); L 15–9	Did not advance				=19
Laura Bruschini; Annamaria Solazzi	Women's	Karadassiou – Sfyri (GRE); W 15–2	Bye	Schmidt – Staub (GER); W 15–12	Cook – Pottharst (AUS); L 11–15	Did not advance		=5
Daniela Gattelli; Lucilla Perrotta	Women's	Gooley – Manser (AUS); L 9–15	Ishizaka – Seike (JPN); W 15–5	May-Treanor – McPeak (USA); L 13–15	Did not advance			=9

== Boxing ==
Athlete	Event	Round of 32	Round of 16	Quarterfinals	Semifinals	Final	
Athlete	Event	Opposition Result	Opposition Result	Opposition Result	Opposition Result	Opposition Result	Rank
Sven Paris	Light welterweight	Rientuanthong (THA); W 14–3	Huste (GER); W 17–11	Allalou (ALG); L 8–22	Did not advance		
Leonard Bundu	Welterweight	Geale (AUS); W 4–2	Munaytbasov (KAZ); L 4–13	Did not advance			
Ciro Di Corcia	Light middleweight	Simion (ROM); L 8–19	Did not advance				
Ottavio Barone	Middleweight	Giannoulas (GRE); L 10–17	Did not advance				
Giacobbe Fragomeni	Light heavyweight	Alvarez (CUB); RSC	Did not advance				
Paolo Vidoz	Super heavyweight	—N/a	Brock (USA); RSC	Peter (NGR); W 14–3	Harrison (GBR); L 16–32	Did not advance	3rd place, bronze medalist(s)

== Canoeing ==
Slalom

Athlete	Event	Preliminary						Final					
Athlete	Event	Run 1	Rank	Run 2	Rank	Total	Rank	Run 1	Rank	Run 2	Rank	Total	Rank
Pierpaolo Ferrazzi	Men's K-1	127.59	4	127.04	5	261.19	11 Q	111.79	2	113.24	8	225.03	3rd place, bronze medalist(s)
Enrico Lazzarotto	Men's K-1	135.18	18	127.04	5	262.22	13 Q	115.03	14	115.03	12	235.92	14
Cristina Giai Pron	Women's K-1	157.34	13	164.55	20	321.89	16	Did not advance					

Sprint

Athlete	Event	Heats		Semifinals		Final	
Athlete	Event	Time	Rank	Time	Rank	Time	Rank
Antonio Scaduto	Men's K-1 500m	1:43.289	5 Q	1:43.432	6	Did not advance	
Jacopo Majochi	Men's K-1 1000m	3:39.176	4 Q	3:39.157	3 Q	3:38.105	8
Beniamino Bonomi; Antonio Rossi	Men's K-2 500m	1:32.902	3 q	1:29.886	1 Q	1:32.635	7
Beniamino Bonomi; Antonio Rossi	Men's K-2 1000m	3:14.316	1 Q	—N/a		3:14.461	1st place, gold medalist(s)
Josefa Idem Guerrini	Women's K-1 500m	1:49.889	1 Q	—N/a		2:13.848	1st place, gold medalist(s)

== Cycling ==
=== Cross country ===
Athlete	Event	Time	Rank
Marco Bui	Men's cross-country	2:16.09	16
Hubert Pallhuber	Men's cross-country	2:22.55	31
Paola Pezzo	Women's cross-country	1:49.24	1st place, gold medalist(s)

=== Road cycling ===
Road race

Athlete	Event	Time	Rank
Michele Bartoli	Men's road race	5:30:34	4
Paolo Bettini	Men's road race	5:30:34	9
Francesco Casagrande	Men's road race	5:30:46	66
Danilo Di Luca	Men's road race	5:30:37	11
Marco Pantani	Men's road race	5:30:46	69
Roberta Bonanomi	Women's road race	DNF	
Alessandra Cappellotto	Women's road race	3:06:31	15
Valeria Cappellotto	Women's road race	3:09:17	31

Road time trial

Athlete	Event	Time	Rank
Alessandra Cappellotto	Women's road time trial	DNF	

=== Track cycling ===
Points race

Athlete	Event	Points	Laps	Rank
Silvio Martinello	Men's	5	1	8
Antonella Bellutti	Women's	19	0	1st place, gold medalist(s)
Silvio Martinello; Marco Villa	Madison	15	0	3rd place, bronze medalist(s)

Keirin

Athlete	Event	1st round	Repechage	2nd round	Final
Athlete	Event	Rank	Rank	Rank	Rank
Roberto Chiappa	Keirin	2 Q	4	Did not advance	

Pursuit

Athlete	Event	Qualification		Semifinals		Final	
Athlete	Event	Time	Rank	Opponent Results	Rank	Opponent Results	Rank
Antonella Bellutti	Women's individual pursuit	3:36.967	5	Did not advance			
Mario Benetton; Adler Capelli; Cristiano Citton; Marco Villa	Team pursuit	4:15.451	11	Did not advance			

== Diving ==
Men

Athlete	Event	Preliminaries		Semifinals				Final		
Athlete	Event	Points	Rank	Points	Rank	Total	Rank	Points	Total	Rank
Nicola Marconi	3m springboard	351.12	26	Did not advance						
Donald Miranda	3m springboard	377.01	18 Q	207.03	14	584.04	16	Did not advance		
Massimiliano Mazzucchi	10m platform	386.91	18 Q	172.80	18	559.71	18	Did not advance		
Nicola Marconi; Donald Miranda	Synchronized 3m springboard	—N/a							286.38	8

Women

Athlete	Event	Preliminaries		Semifinals				Final		
Athlete	Event	Points	Rank	Points	Rank	Total	Rank	Points	Total	Rank
Tania Cagnotto	3m springboard	259.74	18 Q	206.55	18	466.29	18	Did not advance		
Maria Marconi	3m springboard	229.11	30	Did not advance						

== Equestrian ==
Dressage

Athlete	Horse	Event	Grand Prix		Grand Prix Special			Grand Prix Freestyle		Overall	
Athlete	Horse	Event	Score	Rank	Score	Total	Rank	Score	Rank	Score	Rank
Pia Laus	Renoir	Individual	67.68	16 Q	68.41	136.09	17 Q	69.35	4	205.44	14

Eventing

Athlete	Horse	Event	Dressage		Cross-country		Show jumping		Total	
Athlete	Horse	Event	Penalties	Rank	Penalties	Rank	Penalties	Rank	Penalties	Rank
Fabio Magni	Cool N' Breezy	Individual	44.0	10	0	1	5.0	7	49.0	5
Andrea Verdina	Donnizeti	Individual	53.8	27	20	16	14.0	22	87.8	15

Show jumping

Athlete	Horse	Event	Qualification								Final				Total	
Athlete	Horse	Event	Round 1		Round 2			Round 3			Round A		Round B		Total	
Athlete	Horse	Event	Penalties	Rank	Penalties	Total	Rank	Penalties	Total	Rank	Penalties	Rank	Penalties	Rank	Penalties	Rank
Jerry Smit	Lux Z	Individual	16.00	49	16.00	32.00	15	16.00	48.00	54	Did not advance					
Gianni Tovoni	Las Vegas	Individual	9.00	27	4.00	13.00	15	0.00	13.00	8 Q	4.00	5 Q	13.50	18	17.50	18

== Fencing ==
17 fencers, 12 men and 5 women, represented Italy in 2000.

Men

Athlete	Event	Round of 64	Round of 32	Round of 16	Quarterfinal	Semifinal	Final / BM	
Athlete	Event	Opposition Score	Opposition Score	Opposition Score	Opposition Score	Opposition Score	Opposition Score	Rank
Angelo Mazzoni	Men's épée	Bye	Milanoli (ITA); L 13–15	Did not advance				
Paolo Milanoli	Men's épée	Bye	Mazzoni (ITA); W 15–13	Vánky (SWE); L 6–15	Did not advance			
Alfredo Rota	Men's épée	Bye	Switak (AUT); W 15–11	Trevejo (CUB); L 12–15	Did not advance			
Daniele Crosta	Men's foil	Bye	Zennaro (ITA); L 11–15	Did not advance				
Salvatore Sanzo	Men's foil	Bye	Wang H (CHN); W 15–10	C Rodriguez (VEN); W 15–7	Shevchenko (RUS); L 14–15	Did not advance		
Matteo Zennaro	Men's foil	Bye	Crosta (ITA); W 15–11	Holubytskiy (UKR); L 12–15	Did not advance			
Raffaelo Caserta	Men's sabre	Bye	Lapkes (BLR); L 9–15	Did not advance				
Luigi Tarantino	Men's sabre	Bye	Găureanu (ROU); L 10–15	Did not advance				
Tonhi Terenzi	Men's sabre	Bye	Kaliuzhyniy (UKR); W 15–10	Köves (HUN); W 15–14	Ferjancsik (HUN); L 13–15	Did not advance		
Angelo Mazzoni; Paolo Milanoli; Alfredo Rota; Maurizio Randazzo	Men's team épée	—N/a			Australia; W 45–34	South Korea; W 44–43	France; W 39–38	1st place, gold medalist(s)
Daniele Crosta; Gabriele Magni; Salvatore Sanzo; Matteo Zennaro	Men's team foil	—N/a			Ukraine; W 41–40	China; L 32–45	Poland; W 45–38	3rd place, bronze medalist(s)
Raffaelo Caserta; Gianpiero Pastore; Luigi Tarantino; Tonhi Terenzi	Men's team sabre	—N/a			Germany; L 42–45	5/8th classification Ukraine; L 29–45	7/8th classification Poland; L 39–45	8

Women

Athlete	Event	Round of 64	Round of 32	Round of 16	Quarterfinal	Semifinal	Final / BM	
Athlete	Event	Opposition Score	Opposition Score	Opposition Score	Opposition Score	Opposition Score	Opposition Score	Rank
Cristiana Cascioli	Women's épée	Bye	Lamon (SUI); L 12–15	Did not advance				
Margherita Zalaffi	Women's épée	Bye	Liang Q (CHN); W 15–11	Mazina (RUS); W 15–13	Flessel-Colovic (FRA); L 11–15	Did not advance		
Diana Bianchedi	Women's foil	Bye	Yuan L (CHN); W 15–7	Ohayon (ISR); W 15–12	Badea-Cârlescu (ROU); L 4–15	Did not advance		
Giovanna Trillini	Women's foil	Bye	Smith (GBR); W 15–2	Zimmermann (USA); W 15–4	Xiao A (CHN); W 9–8	König (GER); L 10–15	Badea-Cârlescu (ROU); W 15–9	3rd place, bronze medalist(s)
Valentina Vezzali	Women's foil	Bye	Seo M-J (KOR); W 15–3	Gruchała (POL); W 15–8	Lazăr-Szabo (ROU); W 9–8	Badea-Cârlescu (ROU); W 15–8	König (GER); W 15–5	1st place, gold medalist(s)
Diana Bianchedi; Giovanna Trillini; Valentina Vezzali	Women's team foil	Bye			Ukraine; W 45–39	United States; W 45–38	Poland; W 45–36	1st place, gold medalist(s)

== Football ==
=== Men's team competition ===
Team roster

- ( 1.) Morgan De Sanctis
- ( 2.) Alessandro Grandoni
- ( 3.) Luca Mezzano
- ( 4.) Marco Zanchi
- ( 5.) Matteo Ferrari
- ( 6.) Gennaro Gattuso
- ( 7.) Gianni Comandini
- ( 8.) Roberto Baronio
- ( 9.) Nicola Ventola
- (10.) Andrea Pirlo
- (11.) Gianluca Zambrotta
- (12.) Massimo Margiotta
- (13.) Massimo Ambrosini
- (14.) Claudio Rivalta
- (15.) Bruno Cirillo
- (16.) Ighli Vannucchi
- (17.) Cristiano Zanetti
- (18.) Christian Abbiati
- (19.) Gennaro Scarlato
- (20.) Stefano Morrone
- (21.) Fabio Firmani
- (22.) Cristiano Lupatelli

Group stage

Team	Pld	W	D	L	GF	GA	GD	Pts
Italy	3	2	1	0	5	2	+3	7
Nigeria	3	1	2	0	7	6	+1	5
Honduras	3	1	1	1	6	7	−1	4
Australia	3	0	0	3	3	6	−3	0

13 September 2000
20:00

Australia	0–1	Italy
	Report	Pirlo 81'

Melbourne Cricket Ground, Melbourne
Attendance: 93,252
Referee: Peter Prendergast (Jamaica)

16 September 2000
18:30

Italy	3–1	Honduras
Comandini 12', 22'; Ambrosini 18'	Report	Comandini 29' (o.g.)

Hindmarsh Stadium, Adelaide
Attendance: 18,301
Referee: Lu Jun (China)

19 September 2000
18:30

Italy	1–1	Nigeria
Okunowo 65' (o.g.)	Report	Lawal 40'

Hindmarsh Stadium, Adelaide
Attendance: 18,340
Referee: Felipe Ramos (Mexico)

Quarter-finals

23 September 2000
20:00

Italy	0–1	Spain
	Report	Gabri 86'

Sydney Football Stadium, Sydney
Attendance: 38,134
Referee: Carlos Simon (Brazil)

== Gymnastics ==
=== Men ===
Athlete	Event	Qualification								Final							
Athlete	Event	Apparatus						Total	Rank	Apparatus						Total	Rank
Athlete	Event	F	PH	R	V	PB	HB	Total	Rank	F	PH	R	V	PB	HB	Total	Rank
Alberto Busnari	Individual	9.162	9.650	8.362	8.637	9.175	9.700	54.686	40	Did not advance							
Igor Cassina	Individual	8.387	9.500	8.537	9.300	8.737	9.650	54.111	45	Did not advance							

=== Women ===
Team

Athlete	Event	Qualification						Final					
Athlete	Event	Apparatus				Total	Rank	Apparatus				Total	Rank
Athlete	Event	V	UB	BB	F	Total	Rank	V	UB	BB	F	Total	Rank
Monica Bergamelli	Team	9.449	9.387	9.325	9.300	37.461	26 Q	Did not advance					
Martina Bremini	Team	9.043	9.550	9.275	9.137	37.005	36 Q	Did not advance					
Alice Capitani	Team	9.324	—N/a	9.325	9.100	27.749	73	Did not advance					
Irene Castelli	Team	9.075	8.812	8.437	—N/a	35.361	56	Did not advance					
Adriana Crisci	Team	8.937	9.500	9.437	9.312	37.186	31 Q	Did not advance					
Laura Trefiletti	Team	—N/a	9.137	—N/a		9.137	96	Did not advance					
Total	Team	36.853	37.574	37.362	36.849	148.638	11	Did not advance					

Individual

Athlete	Event	Apparatus				Total	Rank
Athlete	Event	V	UB	BB	F	Total	Rank
Monica Bergamelli	All-around	9.449	9.525	8.975	9.500	37.449	18
Martina Bremini	All-around	9.325	9.600	9.375	9.187	37.487	17
Adriana Crisci	All-around	9.187	9.062	8.962	9.675	36.886	25

== Judo ==
Men

Athlete	Event	Round of 32	Round of 16	Quarterfinals	Semifinals	Repechage 1	Repechage 2	Repechage 3	Final / BM	
Athlete	Event	Opposition Result	Opposition Result	Opposition Result	Opposition Result	Opposition Result	Opposition Result	Opposition Result	Opposition Result	Rank
Girolamo Giovinazzo	66kg	Mendez (PUR); W 1000–0000	Guimarães (BRA); W 1000–0000	Vazagashvili (GEO); W 1010–0000	Benboudaoud (FRA); L 0000–1000	—N/a			Miresmaeili (IRI); W 0100–0010	3rd place, bronze medalist(s)
Giuseppe Maddaloni	73kg	Waterhouse (SAM); W 0201–0000	Moussa (TUN); W 1000–0000	Zeļonijs (LAT); W 0011–0001	Laryukhov (BLR); W 1000–0010	—N/a			Camilo (BRA); W 1002–0000	1st place, gold medalist(s)
Francesco Lepre	81kg	Delgado (POR); L 0000–0001	—N/a			Kelly (AUS); L 0001–0010	Did not advance			
Michele Monti	90kg	Costa (ARG); L 0100–1010	Did not advance							
Luigi Guido	100kg	Bagdasarov (UZB); W 0100–0022	Khalki (TUN); W 1010–0000	Sabino (BRA); W 1001–0001	Inoue (JPN); L 0000–0210	—N/a			Styopkin (RUS); L 0000–1000	5

Women

Athlete	Event	Round of 32	Round of 16	Quarterfinals	Semifinals	Repechage 1	Repechage 2	Repechage 3	Final / BM	
Athlete	Event	Opposition Result	Opposition Result	Opposition Result	Opposition Result	Opposition Result	Opposition Result	Opposition Result	Opposition Result	Rank
Cinzia Cavazzuti	57kg	Vernerová (CZE); W	Cavalleri (POR); W	Shen (CHN); L	—N/a		Ferreira (BRA); W	Harel (FRA); W	Pekli (AUS); L	5
Jenny Gal	63kg	Bye	Saraeva (RUS); W	Ishii (BRA); W	Li S (CHN); L	—N/a			Jung (KOR); L	5
Ylenia Scapin	70kg	Griffith (VEN); W	Cho (KOR); L	—N/a			Kuzina (RUS); W	Wansart (GER); W	Martin (ESP); W	3rd place, bronze medalist(s)
Emanuela Pierantozzi	78kg	Bye	Anno (JPN); W	Rakels (BEL); L	—N/a		Keinhuis (NED); W	Silva (BRA); W	Luna (CUB); W	3rd place, bronze medalist(s)

== Modern pentathlon ==
Athlete	Event	Shooting (10 m air pistol)			Fencing (épée one touch)			Swimming (200 m freestyle)			Riding (show jumping)			Running (3000 m)			Total points	Final rank
Athlete	Event	Points	Rank	MP Points	Results	Rank	MP points	Time	Rank	MP points	Penalties	Rank	MP points	Time	Rank	MP Points	Total points	Final rank
Stefano Pecci	Men's	175	17	1036	13	8	880	2:09.72	14	1203	150	15	950	9:47.35	16	1052	5121	13
Claudia Cerutti	Women's	178	18	1072	11	13	800	2:17.18	2	1229	97	10	1003	11:39.90	16	922	5026	9
Fabiana Fares	Women's	161	24	868	13	6	880	2:28.56	19	1115	DNF	–	0	DNS	–	0	2863	24

== Rhythmic gymnastics ==
Individual

Athlete	Event	Qualification						Final					
Athlete	Event	Rope	Hoop	Ball	Ribbon	Total	Rank	Rope	Hoop	Ball	Ribbon	Total	Rank
Susanna Marchesi	Individual	9.725	9.725	9.741	9.733	38.924	7 Q	9.750	9.600	9.775	9.725	38.850	10

Team

Athlete	Event	Qualification				Final			
Athlete	Event	Clubs	Hoops + Ribbon	Total	Rank	Clubs	Hoops + Ribbon	Total	Rank
Elena Amato; Eva D'Amore; Silvia Gregorini; Noemi Iezzi; Roberta Lucentini; Arianna Rusca	Team	19.250	18.933	38.183	8 Q	19.250	19.233	38.483	6

== Rowing ==
27 Italian rowers, all male, competed.

Athlete	Event	Heats		Repechage		Semifinals		Final	
Athlete	Event	Time	Rank	Time	Rank	Time	Rank	Time	Rank
Mattia Righetti	Single sculls	7:24.80	4 R	7:21.20	3 SC/D	7:20.78	2 FC	7:08.16	14
Giovanni Calabrese; Nicola Sartori	Double sculls	6:33.11	2 R	6:25.98	1 SA/B	6:24.99	2 FA	6:20.49	3rd place, bronze medalist(s)
Agostino Abbagnale; Rossano Galtarossa; Simone Raineri; Alessio Sartori	Quadruple sculls	5:45.67	1 Q	—N/a		5:44.08	1 FA	5:45.56	1st place, gold medalist(s)
Pasquale Panzarino; Luigi Sorrentino	Coxless pair	6:48.26	2 Q	—N/a		6:53.57	6 FB	6:40.35	12
Lorenzo Carboncini; Riccardo Dei Rossi; Valter Molea; Carlo Mornati	Coxless four	6:04.59	1 Q	—N/a		6:02.31	2 FA	5:56.62	2nd place, silver medalist(s)
Franco Berra; Gioacchino Cascone; Alessandro Corona; Luca Ghezzi; Gaetano Iannuzzi; Raffaello Leonardo; Mario Palmisano; Marco Penna; Valerio Pinton	Eight	5:39.69	5 R	5:41.23	2 FA	—N/a		5:35.37	4
Elia Luini; Leonardo Pettinari	Lightweight double sculls	6:24.73	1 Q	—N/a		6:21.59	2 FA	6:23.47	2nd place, silver medalist(s)
Catello Amarante; Salvatore Amitrano; Carlo Gaddi; Franco Sancassani	Lightweight coxless four	6:14.89	1 SA/B	—N/a		6:00.82	1 FA	6:03.77	4

== Sailing ==
Italy competed in ten of the sailing events at the 2000 Sydney Olympics and won two medals.

Men

Athlete	Event	Race											Net points	Final rank
Athlete	Event	1	2	3	4	5	6	7	8	9	10	11	Net points	Final rank
Riccardo Giordano	Mistral	~~25~~	14	22	~~29~~	6	21	11	21	3	18	12	182	17
Luca Devoti	Finn	~~19~~	2	2	~~18~~	4	2	3	15	11	1	6	83	2nd place, silver medalist(s)
Francesco Ivaldi; Matteo Ivaldi	470	12	8	16	22	21	~~28~~	9	10	~~26~~	19	22	139	19

Women

Athlete	Event	Race											Net points	Final rank
Athlete	Event	1	2	3	4	5	6	7	8	9	10	11	Net points	Final rank
Alessandra Sensini	Mistral	3	1	3	2	1	~~4~~	1	2	1	~~12~~	1	31	1st place, gold medalist(s)
Larissa Nevierov	Europe	3	9	4	~~19~~	13	~~18~~	7	11	8	8	12	75	8
Federica Salva; Emanuela Sossi	470	4	4	9	~~16~~	2	~~18~~	12	8	10	7	4	60	7

Open events

Athlete	Event	Race																Net points	Final rank
Athlete	Event	1	2	3	4	5	6	7	8	9	10	11	12	13	14	15	16	Net points	Final rank
Diego Negri	Laser	9	17	~~18~~	11	8	15	1	8	13	~~20~~	9	—N/a					91	8
Lorenzo Giacomo Bodini; Marco Bruno Bodini	Tornado	OCS (−17)	12	11	12	12	15	OCS (−17)	6	11	10	9	—N/a					98	14
Ferdinando Colaninno; Pietro D'Alì	Star	9	2	8	6	13	12	10	OCS (−17)	DNC (−17)	2	OCS (−17)	—N/a					79	10
Francesco Bruni; Gabriele Bruni	49er	10	12	9	11	13	11	~~16~~	OCS (−18)	5	7	9	7	11	8	16	5	134	11

== Shooting ==
Men

Athlete	Event	Qualification		Final	
Athlete	Event	Points	Rank	Total	Rank
Andrea Benelli	Skeet	122	5 Q	146	5
Marco De Nicolo	10m air rifle	587	27	Did not advance	
Marco De Nicolo	50m rifle prone	595	10	Did not advance	
Roberto Di Donna	10m air pistol	581	6 Q	680.5	6
Roberto Di Donna	50m pistol	560	8 Q	657.3	7
Daniele Di Spigno	Double trap	129	17	Did not advance	
Vigilio Fait	10m air pistol	571	27	Did not advance	
Vigilio Fait	50m pistol	553	20	Did not advance	
Ennio Falco	Skeet	121	14	Did not advance	
Pietro Genga	Skeet	116	39	Did not advance	
Marco Innocenti	Double trap	135	8	Did not advance	
Giovanni Pellielo	Trap	116	4 Q	140	3rd place, bronze medalist(s)
Paolo Ranno	10m air pistol	575	20	Did not advance	
Marco Venturini	Trap	115	6 Q	138	5
Rodolfo Vigano	Trap	111	18	Did not advance	

Women

Athlete	Event	Qualification		Final	
Athlete	Event	Points	Rank	Total	Rank
Deborah Gelisio	Double trap	107	2 Q	144	2nd place, silver medalist(s)
Giulia Iannotti	Trap	52	17	Did not advance	
Cristina Vitali	Skeet	68	11	Did not advance	

== Softball ==
Team roster

- Marta Gambella
- Daniela Castellani
- Susan Bugliarello
- Francesca Francolini
- Nicole Di Salvio
- Verusca Paternoster
- Giovanna Palermi
- Jie Hua
- Clelia Ailara
- Sabrina Comberlato
- Claudia Petracchi
- Loredana Auletta
- Yue-Fen Sun
- Alessandra Gorla
- Marina Cergol

Results

Team	Event	Group stage								Semifinal	Final / BM	
Team	Event	Opposition Score	Opposition Score	Opposition Score	Opposition Score	Opposition Score	Opposition Score	Opposition Score	Rank	Opposition Score	Opposition Score	Rank
Italy's women	Women's tournament	China; L 0–5	Australia; L 0–7	Cuba; W 1–0	Canada; L 1–7	New Zealand; W 1–0	Japan; L 0–2	United States; L 0–6	5	Did not advance		

== Swimming ==
=== Men ===
Athlete	Event	Heat		Semifinal		Final	
Athlete	Event	Time	Rank	Time	Rank	Time	Rank
Lorenzo Vismara	50m freestyle	22.62	13 Q	22.30	5 Q	22.11	4
Lorenzo Vismara	100m freestyle	49.74	10 Q	49.67	11	Did not advance	
Massimiliano Rosolino	200m freestyle	1:47.37	3 Q	1:46.60	3 Q	1:46.65	3rd place, bronze medalist(s)
Emiliano Brembilla	400m freestyle	3:48.41	4 Q	—N/a		3:47.01	4
Massimiliano Rosolino	400m freestyle	3:45.65	2 Q	—N/a		3:43.40	2nd place, silver medalist(s)
Emiliano Brembilla	1500m freestyle	15:27.65	19	Did not advance			
Christian Minotti	1500m freestyle	15:12.72	10	Did not advance			
Emanuele Merisi	100m backstroke	56.35	21	Did not advance			
Mirko Mazzari	200m backstroke	2:02.13	25	Did not advance			
Emanuele Merisi	200m backstroke	1:59.92	7 Q	1:59.78	8 Q	1:59.01	5
Domenico Fioravanti	100m breaststroke	1:01.32 NR	1 Q	1:00.84 NR	1 Q	1:00.46 OR	1st place, gold medalist(s)
Domenico Fioravanti	200m breaststroke	2:15.04	9 Q	2:12.37 NR	1 Q	2:10.87 EU	1st place, gold medalist(s)
Davide Rummolo	200m breaststroke	2:12.75 NR	1 Q	2:13.23	2 Q	2:12.73	3rd place, bronze medalist(s)
Massimiliano Eroli	200m butterfly	2:01.32	30	Did not advance			
Massimiliano Rosolino	200m individual medley	2:00.92 NR	1 Q	2:01.14	2 Q	1:58.98 OR	1st place, gold medalist(s)
Alessio Boggiatto	400m individual medley	4:14.26 NR	1 Q	—N/a		4:15.93	4
Massimiliano Eroli	400m individual medley	4:22.38	19	Did not advance			
Simone Cercato; Mauro Gallo; Klaus Lanzarini; Massimiliano Rosolino; Lorenzo Vismara	4 × 100 m freestyle relay	3:18.86	4 Q	—N/a		3:17.85	5
Andrea Beccari; Emiliano Brembilla; Simone Cercato; Klaus Lanzarini; Matteo Pelliciari; Massimiliano Rosolino	4 × 200 m freestyle relay	7:17.69	3 Q	—N/a		7:12.91	4

=== Women ===
Athlete	Event	Heat		Semifinal		Final	
Athlete	Event	Time	Rank	Time	Rank	Time	Rank
Cristina Chiuso	50m freestyle	25.99	19	Did not advance			
Cristina Chiuso	100m freestyle	57.09	21	Did not advance			
Sara Parise	200m freestyle	2:01.31	16 Q	2:00.07	10	Did not advance	
Sara Goffi	400m freestyle	4:18.16	28	Did not advance			
Federica Biscia	200m individual medley	2:16.09	10 Q	2:15.71	10	Did not advance	
Federica Biscia	400m individual medley	4:47.56	15	Did not advance			
Cristina Chiuso; Sara Parise; Luisa Striani; Cecilia Vianini	4 × 100 m freestyle relay	3:43.97	8 Q	—N/a		3:44.49	8
Sara Goffi; Sara Parise; Luisa Striani; Cecilia Vianini	4 × 200 m freestyle relay	8:06.18	4 Q	—N/a		8:04.68	7

== Synchronized swimming ==
Athlete	Event	Technical routine		Free routine (preliminary)			Free routine (final)		
Athlete	Event	Points	Rank	Points	Total (technical + free)	Rank	Points	Total (technical + free)	Rank
Maurizia Cecconi; Alessia Lucchini	Duet	33.203	7	61.750	94.953	6 Q	33.203	95.387	6
Giada Ballan; Serena Bianchi; Mara Brunetti; Chiara Cassin; Maurizia Cecconi; Alice Dominici; Alessia Lucchini; Clara Porchetto	Team	—N/a					32.993	95.177	6

== Taekwondo ==
Athlete	Event	Round of 16	Quarterfinals	Semifinals	Repechage 1	Repechage 2	Final / BM	
Athlete	Event	Opposition Result	Opposition Result	Opposition Result	Opposition Result	Opposition Result	Opposition Result	Rank
Claudio Nolano	Men's 68 kg	López (USA); L 0–7	—N/a		Massimino (AUS); L 7–9	Did not advance		
Mario de Meo	Men's 80 kg	Mokhosi (LES); W 3+ – 3	Konan (CIV); L 3–4	Did not advance				
Cristiana Corsi	Women's 57 kg	C Silva (BRA); W 5–2	Jung (KOR); L 1–8	—N/a		Lourens (NED); L 5–6	Did not advance	

== Tennis ==
Athlete	Event	Round of 64	Round of 32	Round of 16	Quarterfinals	Semifinals	Final / BM	
Athlete	Event	Opposition Score	Opposition Score	Opposition Score	Opposition Score	Opposition Score	Opposition Score	Rank
Gianluca Pozzi	Men's singles	Novák (CZE); W 6–1, 6–2	Alami (MAR); L 6–2, 6–4, 8–6	Did not advance				

== Triathlon ==
Athlete	Event	Swim (1.5 km)	Bike (40 km)	Run (10 km)	Total time	Rank
Alessandro Bottoni	Men's	18:48.79	58:44.21	33:45.46	1:51:18.13	32
Edith Cigana	Women's	20:42.28	1:06:52.10	39:32.43	2:07:05.01	27
Silvia Gemignani	Women's	19:46.58	1:07:46.30	37:48.38	2:05:21.26	20

== Volleyball ==
=== Men's team competition ===
Team roster

- Marco Bracci
- Mirko Corsano
- Alessandro Fei
- Andrea Gardini
- Andrea Giani
- Pasquale Gravina
- Luigi Mastrangelo
- Marco Meoni
- Samuele Papi
- Simone Rosalba
- Andrea Sartoretti
- Paolo Tofoli
- Nyembo Mwarabu
- Head coach: Andrea Anastasi

Results

Team	Event	Group stage						Quarterfinal	Semifinal	Final / BM	
Team	Event	Opposition Score	Opposition Score	Opposition Score	Opposition Score	Opposition Score	Rank	Opposition Score	Opposition Score	Opposition Score	Rank
Italy men's	Men's tournament	South Korea; W 3–0	FR Yugoslavia; W 3–2	Argentina; W 3–0	Russia; W 3–1	United States; W 3–1	1 Q	Australia; W 3–1	FR Yugoslavia; L 3–0	Argentina; W 3–0	3rd place, bronze medalist(s)

=== Women's team competition ===
Team roster

- Sabrina Bertini
- Antonella Bragaglia
- Maurizia Cacciatori
- Ana Paula de Tassis
- Manuela Leggeri
- Eleonora Lo Bianco
- Anna Vania Mello
- Darina Mifkova
- Paola Paggi
- Francesca Piccinini
- Simona Rinieri
- Elisa Togut
- Head coach: Angelo Frigoni

Results

Team	Event	Group stage						Quarterfinal	Semifinal	Final / BM	
Team	Event	Opposition Score	Opposition Score	Opposition Score	Opposition Score	Opposition Score	Rank	Opposition Score	Opposition Score	Opposition Score	Rank
Italy women's	Women's tournament	South Korea; L 2–3	Peru; W 3–0	Russia; L 1–3	Cuba; L 0–3	Germany; L 1–3	5	Did not advance			=9

== Water polo ==
Team roster
- Alberto Angelini
- Francesco Attolico
- Fabio Bencivenga
- Leonardo Binchi
- Alberto Ghibellini
- Amedeo Pomilio
- Francesco Postiglione
- Carlo Silipo
- Leonardo Sottani
- Stefano Tempesti
- Antonio Vittorioso

Summary

Team	Event	Group stage						Quarterfinal	Semifinal	Final / BM	
Team	Event	Opposition Score	Opposition Score	Opposition Score	Opposition Score	Opposition Score	Rank	Opposition Score	Opposition Score	Opposition Score	Rank
Italy men's	Men's tournament	Slovakia; W 11–8	Russia; D 7–7	Spain; W 6–5	Australia; W 6–5	Kazakhstan; W 13–7	2 Q	Hungary; L 5–8	Australia; W 8–4	5–6th place match United States; W 10–8	5

== Weightlifting ==
Men

Athlete	Event	Snatch			Clean & jerk			Total	Rank
Athlete	Event	1	2	3	1	2	3	Total	Rank
Giuseppe Ficco	– 69 kg	127.5	~~132.5~~	132.5	165.0	170.0	—	302.5	13
Sergio Mannironi	– 85 kg	~~150.0~~	150.0	~~155.0~~	180.0	~~190.0~~	~~190.0~~	330.0	17
Moreno Boer	– 105 kg	~~165.0~~	165.0	~~172.5~~	200.0	~~210.0~~	~~210.0~~	365.0	12

== Wrestling ==
Greco-Roman

Athlete	Event	Elimination pool				Quarterfinal	Semifinal	Final / BM	
Athlete	Event	Opposition Result	Opposition Result	Opposition Result	Rank	Opposition Result	Opposition Result	Opposition Result	Rank
Riccardo Magni	Men's 63 kg	Bracken (USA); L 2–2	Choi S-s (KOR); L 1–5	—N/a	3	Did not advance			
Giuseppe Giunta	Men's 130 kg	Galstyan (ARM); W 1–0	Ayari (TUN); W 4–0	Gardner (USA); L 1–2	2	Did not advance			

== See also ==
- Italy at the 2000 Summer Paralympics

== Sources ==
- Wallechinsky, David (2004). The Complete Book of the Summer Olympics (Athens 2004 Edition). Toronto, Canada. ISBN 1-894963-32-6.
- International Olympic Committee (2001). The Results. Retrieved 12 November 2005.
- Sydney Organising Committee for the Olympic Games (2001). Official Report of the XXVII Olympiad Volume 1: Preparing for the Games. Retrieved 20 November 2005.
- Sydney Organising Committee for the Olympic Games (2001). Official Report of the XXVII Olympiad Volume 2: Celebrating the Games. Retrieved 20 November 2005.
- Sydney Organising Committee for the Olympic Games (2001). The Results. Retrieved 20 November 2005.
- International Olympic Committee Web Site
