= Fencing at the 1996 Summer Olympics – Men's foil =

Fencing at the Olympics

Men's foil at the Games of the XXVI Olympiad
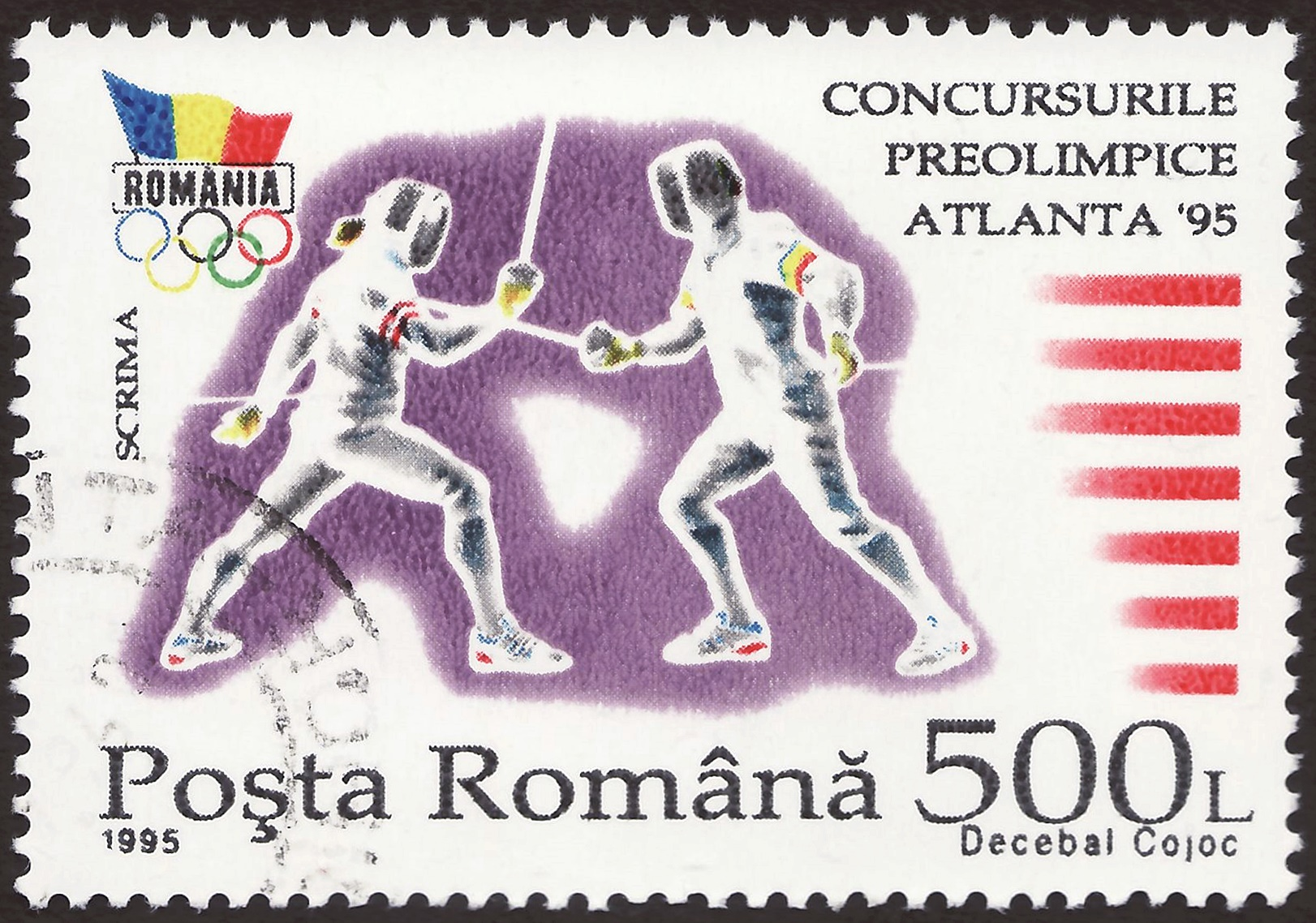
- Romanian stamp commemorating 1996 Olympic fencing
- Venue: Georgia World Congress Center
- Dates: 22 July 1996
- Competitors: 45 from 19 nations

Medalists
1st place, gold medalist(s)		Alessandro Puccini	Italy
2nd place, silver medalist(s)		Lionel Plumenail	France
3rd place, bronze medalist(s)		Franck Boidin	France

The men's foil was one of ten fencing events on the fencing at the 1996 Summer Olympics programme. It was the twenty-second appearance of the event. The competition was held on 22 July 1996. 45 fencers from 19 nations competed. Nations had been limited to three fencers each since 1928. The event was won by Alessandro Puccini of Italy, the nation's eighth victory in the men's foil (matching France for most all-time). France took the other two medals, with Lionel Plumenail earning silver and Franck Boidin winning the bronze medal match.

== Background ==
This was the 22nd appearance of the event, which has been held at every Summer Olympics except 1908 (when there was a foil display only rather than a medal event). Four of the eight quarterfinalists from 1992 returned: gold medalist Philippe Omnès of France, silver medalist Serhiy Holubytskiy of the Unified Team (now competing for Ukraine), bronze medalist Elvis Gregory of Cuba, and fifth-place finisher Joachim Wendt of Austria. The three world champions since the last Games were Alexander Koch of Germany, Rolando Tucker of Cuba, and Dmitriy Shevchenko of Russia; all were competing in Atlanta.

Kazakhstan, Russia, Ukraine, and Uzbekistan each made their debut in the men's foil. France and the United States each made their 20th appearance, tied for most of any nation; France had missed only the 1904 (with fencers not traveling to St. Louis) and the 1912 (boycotted due to a dispute over rules) foil competitions, while the United States had missed the inaugural 1896 competition and boycotted the 1980 Games altogether.

== Competition format ==
The 1996 tournament vastly simplified the competition format after a horrendously complex system used in the previous Games in Barcelona. Pool play was eliminated. Double elimination was eliminated. The tournament became a simple single-elimination bracket, with a bronze medal match. Bouts were to 15 touches. Standard foil rules regarding target area, striking, and priority were used.

== Schedule ==
All times are Eastern Daylight Time (UTC-4)

Date	Time	Round
Monday, 22 July 1996		Round of 64; Round of 32; Round of 16; Quarterfinals; Semifinals; Bronze medal match Final

== Results ==
=== Section 1 ===
Round of 64
Wang Haibin (CHN)	15
Peter Devine (USA)	12
Leandro Marchetti (ARG)	15
Marco Falchetto (AUT)	13
Piotr Kiełpikowski (POL)	15
Hiroki Ichigatani (JPN)	13

Round of 32
Rolando Tucker (CUB)	15
Wang Haibin (CHN)	11
Márk Marsi (HUN)	10
Zsolt Érsek (HUN)	15
Wolfgang Wienand (GER)	15
Leandro Marchetti (ARG)	1
Piotr Kiełpikowski (POL)	15
Stefano Cerioni (ITA)	7

Round of 16
Rolando Tucker (CUB)	15
Zsolt Érsek (HUN)	4
Wolfgang Wienand (GER)	15
Piotr Kiełpikowski (POL)	11

Quarterfinals
Rolando Tucker (CUB)	12
Wolfgang Wienand (GER)	15

=== Section 2 ===
Round of 64
Michael Ludwig (AUT)	15
Carlos Rodríguez (VEN)	11
Vladislav Pavlovich (RUS)	15
Alfredo Pérez (VEN)	2
Ye Chong (CHN)	15
Rafkat Ruziyev (UZB)	4
Kim Yong-Guk (KOR)	15
Róbert Kiss (HUN)	11

Round of 32
Lionel Plumenail (FRA)	15
Michael Ludwig (AUT)	12
Vladislav Pavlovich (RUS)	15
José Francisco Guerra (ESP)	11
Alexander Koch (GER)	13
Ye Chong (CHN)	15
Kim Yong-Guk (KOR)	4
Serhiy Holubytskiy (UKR)	15

Round of 16
Lionel Plumenail (FRA)	15
Vladislav Pavlovich (RUS)	12
Ye Chong (CHN)	14
Serhiy Holubytskiy (UKR)	15

Quarterfinals
Lionel Plumenail (FRA)	15
Serhiy Holubytskiy (UKR)	13

=== Section 3 ===
Round of 64
Adam Krzesiński (POL)	15
Nick Bravin (USA)	14
Javier García (ESP)	15
Rafael Suárez (VEN)	10
Jeong Su-Gi (KOR)	15
Ilgar Mamedov (RUS)	8

Round of 32
Elvis Gregory (CUB)	15
Adam Krzesiński (POL)	10
Vyacheslav Grigoryev (KAZ)	4
Philippe Omnès (FRA)	15
Oscar García (CUB)	11
Javier García (ESP)	15
Jeong Su-Gi (KOR)	14
Franck Boidin (FRA)	15

Round of 16
Elvis Gregory (CUB)	14
Philippe Omnès (FRA)	15
Javier García (ESP)	12
Franck Boidin (FRA)	15

Quarterfinals
Philippe Omnès (FRA)	11
Franck Boidin (FRA)	15

=== Section 4 ===
Round of 64
Oleksiy Bryzhalov (UKR)	15
Cliff Bayer (USA)	11
Ryszard Sobczak (POL)	15
Abdulmohsen Shahrayen (KUW)	7
Kim Yeong-Ho (KOR)	15
Dong Zhaozhi (CHN)	12

Round of 32
Alessandro Puccini (ITA)	15
Oleksiy Bryzhalov (UKR)	12
Ryszard Sobczak (POL)	15
Marco Arpino (ITA)	14
Uwe Römer (GER)	15
Joachim Wendt (AUT)	7
Kim Yeong-Ho (KOR)	15
Dmitry Shevchenko (RUS)	13

Round of 16
Alessandro Puccini (ITA)	15
Ryszard Sobczak (POL)	4
Uwe Römer (GER)	13
Kim Yeong-Ho (KOR)	15

Quarterfinals
Alessandro Puccini (ITA)	15
Kim Yeong-Ho (KOR)	14

=== Finals ===
Semifinals
Wolfgang Wienand (GER)	9
Lionel Plumenail (FRA)	15
Franck Boidin (FRA)	13
Alessandro Puccini (ITA)	15

Final
Lionel Plumenail (FRA)	12
Alessandro Puccini (ITA)	15
Bronze medal match
Wolfgang Wienand (GER)	11
Franck Boidin (FRA)	15

== Final classification ==
Rank	Fencer	Nation
1st place, gold medalist(s)	Alessandro Puccini	Italy
2nd place, silver medalist(s)	Lionel Plumenail	France
3rd place, bronze medalist(s)	Franck Boidin	France
4	Wolfgang Wienand	Germany
5	Rolando Tucker	Cuba
6	Serhiy Holubytskiy	Ukraine
7	Philippe Omnès	France
8	Kim Yeong-Ho	South Korea
9	Elvis Gregory	Cuba
10	Zsolt Érsek	Hungary
11	Uwe Römer	Germany
12	Ye Chong	China
13	Javier García	Spain
14	Vladislav Pavlovich	Russia
15	Ryszard Sobczak	Poland
16	Piotr Kiełpikowski	Poland
17	Dmitry Shevchenko	Russia
18	Stefano Cerioni	Italy
19	Marco Arpino	Italy
20	Oscar García	Cuba
21	José Francisco Guerra	Spain
22	Alexander Koch	Germany
23	Joachim Wendt	Austria
24	Márk Marsi	Hungary
25	Vyacheslav Grigoryev	Kazakhstan
26	Michael Ludwig	Austria
27	Adam Krzesiński	Poland
28	Wang Haibin	China
29	Kim Yong-Guk	South Korea
30	Jeong Su-Gi	South Korea
31	Oleksiy Bryzhalov	Ukraine
32	Leandro Marchetti	Argentina
33	Marco Falchetto	Austria
34	Cliff Bayer	United States
35	Ilgar Mamedov	Russia
36	Róbert Kiss	Hungary
37	Peter Devine	United States
38	Dong Zhaozhi	China
39	Nick Bravin	United States
40	Carlos Rodríguez	Venezuela
41	Hiroki Ichigatani	Japan
42	Abdulmohsen Shahrayen	Kuwait
43	Rafael Suárez	Venezuela
44	Rafkat Ruziyev	Uzbekistan
45	Alfredo Pérez	Venezuela
