= Fencing at the 2000 Summer Olympics – Men's team foil =

Men's team foil at the Games of the XXVII Olympiad
- Venue: Sydney Exhibition Centre
- Dates: 22 September 2000
- Competitors: 28 from 8 nations

Medalists
1st place, gold medalist(s)		Jean-Noël Ferrari; Lionel Plumenail; Brice Guyart; Patrice Lhôtellier	France
2nd place, silver medalist(s)		Dong Zhaozhi; Wang Haibin; Ye Chong	China
3rd place, bronze medalist(s)		Salvatore Sanzo; Matteo Zennaro; Daniele Crosta; Gabriele Magni	Italy

The men's team épée was one of ten fencing events on the fencing at the 2000 Summer Olympics programme. The competition was held on 22 September 2000. 28 fencers from 8 nations competed.

== Main tournament bracket ==
The field of 8 teams competed in a single-elimination tournament to determine the medal winners. Semifinal losers proceeded to a bronze medal match. Matches were also conducted to determine the final team placements.

Quarterfinals
Germany; Wolfgang Wienand; Ralf Bißdorf; Richard Breutner	37
Poland; Sławomir Mocek; Ryszard Sobczak; Adam Krzesiński	45
Cuba; Elvis Gregory; Oscar García; Rolando Tucker	43
France; Jean-Noël Ferrari; Lionel Plumenail; Brice Guyart	45
Italy; Salvatore Sanzo; Matteo Zennaro; Daniele Crosta	41
Ukraine; Oleksiy Kruhliak; Serhiy Holubytskiy; Oleksiy Bryzhalov	40
China; Dong Zhaozhi; Wang Haibin; Ye Chong	45
Russia; Dmitry Shevchenko; Ilgar Mamedov; Oleksiy Bryzhalov	30

Semifinals
Poland; Sławomir Mocek; Ryszard Sobczak; Adam Krzesiński	38
France; Jean-Noël Ferrari; Lionel Plumenail; Brice Guyart	45
Italy; Salvatore Sanzo; Matteo Zennaro; Daniele Crosta	32
China; Dong Zhaozhi; Wang Haibin; Ye Chong	45

Gold Medal Final
France; Jean-Noël Ferrari; Lionel Plumenail; Brice Guyart	45
China; Dong Zhaozhi; Wang Haibin; Ye Chong	44
Bronze Medal match
Poland; Sławomir Mocek; Ryszard Sobczak; Adam Krzesiński	38
Italy; Salvatore Sanzo; Gabriele Magni; Daniele Crosta	45

== Classification 5-8 ==
Placement 5-6
Germany; Richard Breutner; Ralf Bißdorf; David Hausmann	45
Cuba; Elvis Gregory; Rolando Tucker; Oscar García	44
Ukraine; Oleksiy Kruhliak; Serhiy Holubytskiy; Oleksiy Bryzhalov	45
Russia; Dmitry Shevchenko; Ilgar Mamedov; Andrey Deyev	36

Fifth place match
Germany; Richard Breutner; Ralf Bißdorf; David Hausmann	43
Ukraine; Oleksiy Kruhliak; Serhiy Holubytskiy; Oleksiy Bryzhalov	45
Seventh place match
Cuba; Elvis Gregory; Rolando Tucker; Oscar García	45
Russia; Dmitry Shevchenko; Aleksandr Lakatosh; Andrey Deyev	39
