= Fencing at the 2000 Summer Olympics =

Fencing at the Games of the XXVII Olympiad

At the 2000 Summer Olympics, ten fencing events were contested. Men competed in both individual and team events for each of the three weapon types (épée, foil and sabre). Women competed in the foil and the épée events. The events took place at the Sydney Convention and Exhibition Centre.

== Medal summary ==
=== Men's events ===
Games	Gold	Silver	Bronze
individual épée	Pavel Kolobkov; Russia	Hugues Obry; France	Lee Sang-ki; South Korea
team épée	Italy; Angelo Mazzoni; Paolo Milanoli; Maurizio Randazzo; Alfredo Rota	France; Jean-François di Martino; Robert Leroux; Hugues Obry; Éric Srecki	Cuba; Nelson Loyola; Candido Alberto Maya; Carlos Pedroso; Iván Trevejo
Individual foil	Kim Young-ho; South Korea	Ralf Bißdorf; Germany	Dmitriy Shevchenko; Russia
team foil	France; Jean-Noel Ferrari; Brice Guyart; Patrice Lhotellier; Lionel Plumenail	China; Dong Zhaozhi; Wang Haibin; Ye Chong; Zhang Jie	Italy; Daniele Crosta; Gabriele Magni; Salvatore Sanzo; Matteo Zennaro
Individual sabre	Mihai Covaliu; Romania	Mathieu Gourdain; France	Wiradech Kothny; Germany
team sabre	Russia; Sergey Sharikov; Aleksey Frosin; Stanislav Pozdnyakov	France; Mathieu Gourdain; Julien Pillet; Cédric Séguin; Damien Touya	Germany; Dennis Bauer; Wiradech Kothny; Eero Lehmann; Alexander Weber

=== Women's events ===
Games	Gold	Silver	Bronze
Individual épée	Tímea Nagy; Hungary	Gianna Hablützel-Bürki; Switzerland	Laura Flessel-Colovic; France
team épée	Russia; Karina Aznavourian; Oksana Yermakova; Tatiana Logunova; Maria Mazina	Switzerland; Gianna Hablützel-Bürki; Sophie Lamon; Diana Romagnoli; Tabea Steffen	China; Li Na; Liang Qin; Liu Yinqing; Yang Shaoqi
Individual foil	Valentina Vezzali; Italy	Rita Koenig; Germany	Giovanna Trillini; Italy
team foil	Italy; Diana Bianchedi; Annamaria Giacometti; Giovanna Trillini; Valentina Vezzali	Poland; Sylwia Gruchała; Magdalena Mroczkiewicz; Anna Rybicka; Barbara Wolnicka-Szewczyk	Germany; Sabine Bau; Rita König; Gesine Schiel; Monika Weber

== Medal table ==
Italy finished top of the fencing medal table at the 2000 Summer Olympics.

Rank	Nation	Gold	Silver	Bronze	Total
1	Italy	3	0	2	5
2	Russia	3	0	1	4
3	France	1	4	1	6
4	South Korea	1	0	1	2
5	Hungary	1	0	0	1
5	Romania	1	0	0	1
7	Germany	0	2	3	5
8	Switzerland	0	2	0	2
9	China	0	1	1	2
10	Poland	0	1	0	1
11	Cuba	0	0	1	1
Totals (11 entries)		10	10	10	30

== Participating nations ==
A total of 217 fencers (134 men and 83 women) from 40 nations competed at the Sydney Games:

- Algeria (2)
- Argentina (3)
- Australia (7)
- Austria (6)
- Belarus (4)
- Brazil (1)
- Canada (4)
- Chile (1)
- China (13)
- Colombia (2)
- Cuba (11)
- Egypt (5)
- Estonia (4)
- France (16)
- Germany (18)
- Great Britain (3)
- Hungary (13)
- Israel (1)
- Italy (17)
- Japan (4)
- Kazakhstan (5)
- Kuwait (1)
- Kyrgyzstan (1)
- Latvia (1)
- Norway (3)
- Poland (10)
- Portugal (1)
- Puerto Rico (1)
- Romania (5)
- Russia (15)
- FR Yugoslavia (1)
- South Korea (7)
- Spain (4)
- Sweden (1)
- Switzerland (5)
- Tunisia (1)
- Ukraine (10)
- United States (8)
- Uzbekistan (1)
- Venezuela (1)
