= Venezuela at the 1996 Summer Olympics =

- IOC code: VEN
- NOC: Venezuelan Olympic Committee
- Website: cov.com.ve (in Spanish)

in Atlanta
- Competitors: 39 in 12 sports
- Flag bearer: Francisco Sánchez
- Medals: Gold 0 Silver 0 Bronze 0 Total 0

Summer Olympics appearances (overview)
- 1948; 1952; 1956; 1960; 1964; 1968; 1972; 1976; 1980; 1984; 1988; 1992; 1996; 2000; 2004; 2008; 2012; 2016; 2020; 2024; 2028

Venezuela competed at the 1996 Summer Olympics in Atlanta, United States. 39 competitors, 34 men and 5 women, took part in 36 events in 12 sports.

== Competitors ==
The following is the list of number of competitors in the Games.

Sport	Men	Women	Total
Athletics	4	0	4
Boxing	2	–	2
Cycling	5	1	6
Diving	1	0	1
Fencing	4	0	4
Judo	0	3	3
Sailing	1	0	1
Swimming	7	0	7
Table tennis	0	1	1
Tennis	3	0	3
Weightlifting	1	–	1
Wrestling	6	–	6
Total	34	5	39

== Athletics ==
Key

- Note–Ranks given for track events are within the athlete's heat only
- Q = Qualified for the next round
- q = Qualified for the next round as a fastest loser or, in field events, by position without achieving the qualifying target
- NR = National record
- N/A = Round not applicable for the event
- Bye = Athlete not required to compete in round

Men
Track & road events

Athlete	Event	Heat		Semifinal		Final	
Athlete	Event	Result	Rank	Result	Rank	Result	Rank
Néstor Nieves	3,000 m steeplechase	8:47.34	10	Did not advance			
Rubén Maza	Marathon	—N/a				2:23:24	59
Carlos Tarazona	Marathon	—N/a				2:32:35	89

Field events

Athlete	Event	Qualification		Final	
Athlete	Event	Distance	Position	Distance	Position
Yojer Medina	Shot put	18.53 m	23	Did not advance	

== Boxing ==
Athlete	Event	Round of 32	Round of 16	Quarterfinals	Semifinals	Final	
Athlete	Event	Opposition Result	Opposition Result	Opposition Result	Opposition Result	Opposition Result	Rank
Carlos Barreto	Bantamweight	A Khristov (BUL); W 9-3	V Khadpo (THA); L 14-6	Did not advance			
Jesús Guevara	Super Heavyweight	J Blocus (FRA); L RSC-2	Did not advance				

== Cycling ==
=== Road ===
Athlete	Event	Time	Rank
Hussein Monsalve	Men's road race	5:05:38	115
Manuel Guevara	Men's road race	DNF	
Carlos Maya	Men's road race	DNF	
José Balaustre	Men's road race	DNF	
Rubén Abreu	Men's road race	DNF	

=== Track ===
Points Race

Athlete	Event	Points	Rank
Daniela Larreal	Women's points race	0	15

Sprint

Athlete	Event	Qualification		Round 1	Repechage 1	Quarterfinals	Semifinals	Final	
Athlete	Event	Time Speed (km/h)	Rank	Opposition Time Speed (km/h)	Opposition Time Speed (km/h)	Opposition Time Speed (km/h)	Opposition Time Speed (km/h)	Opposition Time Speed (km/h)	Rank
Daniela Larreal	Women's sprint	11.878 s (60.61)	10 Q	O Grishina (RUS); L	Yang W (CHN); M Kasslin (FIN); L	Did not advance			

== Diving ==
Men

Athlete	Event	Preliminaries		Semifinals		Final	
Athlete	Event	Points	Rank	Points	Rank	Points	Rank
Dario Di Fazio	3 m springboard	317.04	25	Did not advance			
Dario Di Fazio	10 m platform	307.02	25	Did not advance			

== Fencing ==
Four fencers, all men, represented Venezuela in 1996.

Men

Athlete	Event	Round of 64	Round of 32	Round of 16	Quarterfinal	Semifinal	Final / BM	
Athlete	Event	Opposition Score	Opposition Score	Opposition Score	Opposition Score	Opposition Score	Opposition Score	Rank
Alfredo Pérez	Individual foil	V Pavlovich (RUS); L 2–15	Did not advance					
Carlos Rodríguez	Individual foil	M Ludwig (AUT); L 11–15	Did not advance					
Rafael Suárez	Individual foil	J García (ESP); L 10–15	Did not advance					
Alfredo Pérez; Carlos Rodríguez; Rafael Suárez	Team foil	Did not advance						11
Carlos Bravo	Individual sabre	A García (ESP); L 15–11	Did not advance					

== Judo ==
Women

Athlete	Event	Round of 32	Round of 16	Quarterfinals	Semifinals	Repechage	Repechage 2	Final / BM	
Athlete	Event	Opposition Result	Opposition Result	Opposition Result	Opposition Result	Opposition Result	Opposition Result	Opposition Result	Rank
Katiuska Santaella	Women's 52 kg	Bye	M Pedulla (USA); L	Did not advance					
Xiomara Griffith	Women's 61 kg	C Schutz (USA); W	M Vernerova (CZE); W	G Vandecaveye (BEL); L	Did not advance	H Tbessi (TUN); W	I Kobas (TUR); L	Did not advance	7
Francis Gómez	Women's 72 kg	Bye	N Galea (MLT); W	E Essombe (FRA); L	Did not advance	D Luna (CUB); L	Did not advance		9

== Sailing ==
Men

Athlete	Event	Race									Net points	Final rank
Athlete	Event	1	2	3	4	5	6	7	8	9	Net points	Final rank
Roland Milošević	Mistral	12	30	28	~~47~~	18	26	20	~~33~~	21	155	26

== Swimming ==
Men

Athlete	Event	Heat		Final	
Athlete	Event	Time	Rank	Time	Rank
Francisco Sánchez	50 m freestyle	22.68	8 Q	22.72	7
Francisco Sánchez	100 m freestyle	49.59	4 Q	49.84	8
Carlos Santander	200 m freestyle	1:53.13	27	Did not advance	
Ricardo Monasterio	400 m freestyle	4:00.44	25	Did not advance	
Ricardo Monasterio	1500 m freestyle	15:42.39	20	Did not advance	
Francisco Sánchez	100 m butterfly	53.90	13		17
Nelson Mora	200 m butterfly	2:01.50	24	Did not advance	
Diego Henao; Carlos Santander; Alejandro Carrizo; Francisco Sánchez	4×100 m freestyle relay	3:23.04	13	Did not advance	
Francisco Sánchez; Carlos Santander; Diego Henao; Rafael Manzano	4×200 m freestyle relay	7:32.63	11	Did not advance	

== Table tennis ==
Athlete	Event	Group Round		Round of 16	Quarterfinals	Semifinals	Final / BM	
Athlete	Event	Opposition Result	Rank	Opposition Result	Opposition Result	Opposition Result	Opposition Result	Rank
Fabiola Ramos	Women's singles	Group E Chai Po Wa (HKG); L 0–2; A Simion (ROU); L 0-2; M Hooman-Kloppenburg (NED); L 0-2	4	Did not advance				

== Tennis ==
Men

Athlete	Event	Round of 64	Round of 32	Round of 16	Quarterfinal	Semifinal	Final / BM	
Athlete	Event	Opposition Score	Opposition Score	Opposition Score	Opposition Score	Opposition Score	Opposition Score	Rank
Nicolas Pereira	Singles	H Gumy (ARG); W 6–4, 6-0	L Paes (IND); L 2–6, 3–6	Did not advance				
Jimy Szymanski	Singles	W Black (ZIM); L 7–6^{(7–4)}, 4–6, 3-6	Did not advance					
Juan-Carlos Bianchi; Nicolas Pereira	Doubles	—N/a	S Iwabuchi / T Suzuki (JPN); L 6–4, 6–7^{(5–7)}, 6-8	Did not advance				

== Weightlifting ==
Men

Athlete	Event	Snatch		Clean & Jerk		Total	Rank
Athlete	Event	Result	Rank	Result	Rank	Total	Rank
Julio César Luna	Men's 91 kg	165.0	13	210	6	375	9

== Wrestling ==
Men's Freestyle

Athlete	Event	Round 1	Round 2		Round 3		Round 4		Repechage 4	Repechage 5	Final / BM	
Athlete	Event	Opposition Result	Repechage 1	Opposition Result	Repechage 2	Quarterfinals	Repechage 3	Semifinals	Opposition Result	Opposition Result	Opposition Result	Rank
Luis Varela	82 kg	L Dvorák (HUN); L	S Öztürk (TUR); L	Did not advance								17

Men's Greco-Roman

Athlete	Event	Round 1	Round 2		Round 3		Round 4		Repechage 4	Repechage 5	Final / BM	
Athlete	Event	Opposition Result	Repechage 1	Opposition Result	Repechage 2	Quarterfinals	Repechage 3	Semifinals	Opposition Result	Opposition Result	Opposition Result	Rank
José Ochoa	48 kg	A Pavlov (BLR); L	M Maynard (USA); L	Did not advance								16
Winston Santos	62 kg	H Komyshenko (UKR); L	M Pirim (TUR); L	Did not advance								19
Nestor García	74 kg	M Iskandaryan (RUS); L	T Kornbakk (SWE); L	Did not advance								17
Elias Marcano	82 kg	D Turlykhanov (KAZ); L	A Jovančević (YUG); L	Did not advance								16
Emilio Suárez	100 kg	T Edisherashvili (RUS); L	J Giraldo (COL); W	Did not advance	T Nonomura (JPN); L	Did not advance						15

== See also ==
- Venezuela at the 1995 Pan American Games
