= Cycling at the 1996 Summer Olympics – Men's track time trial =

Cycling at the Olympics

Men's track time trial at the Games of the XXVI Olympiad
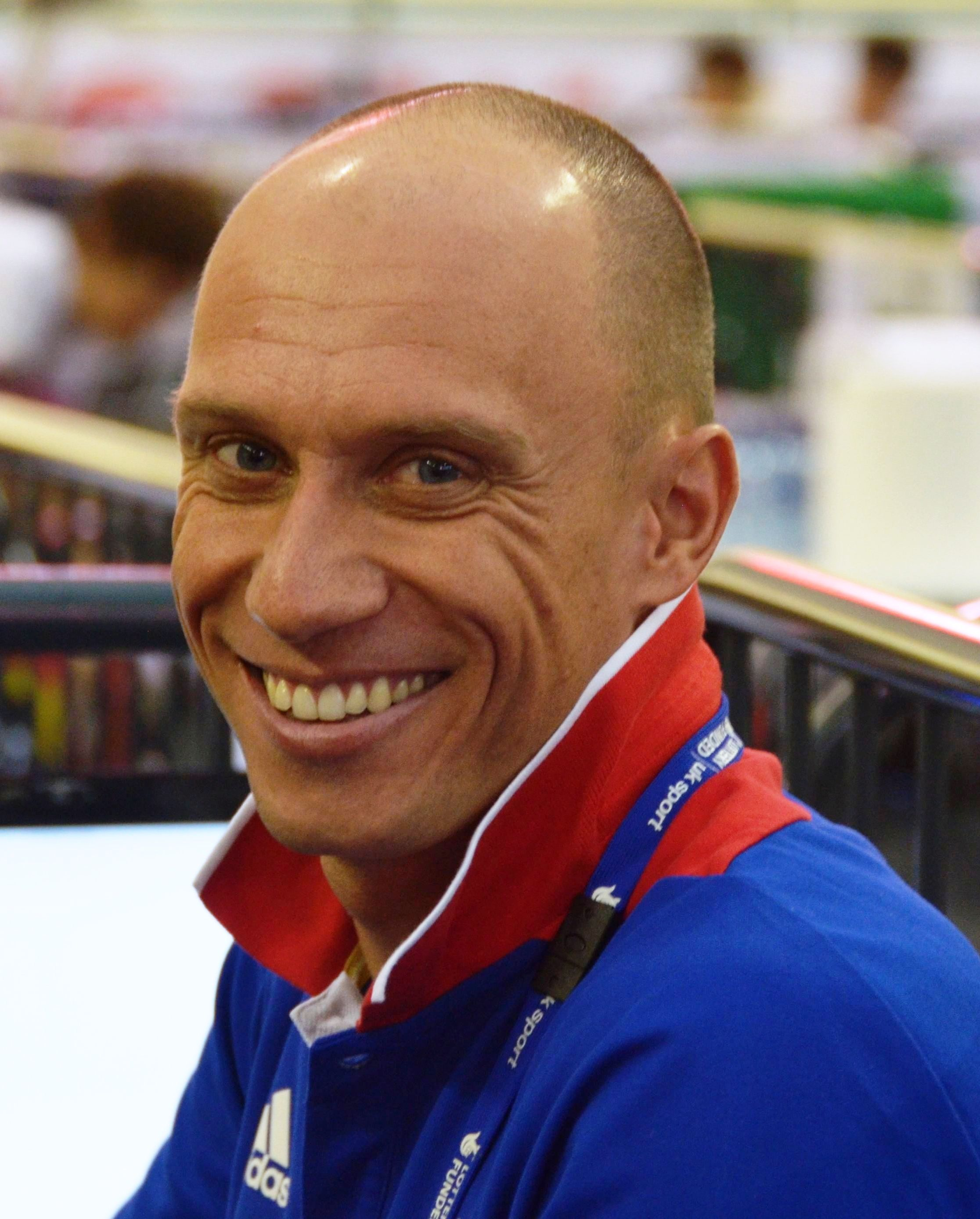
- Florian Rousseau (2012)
- Venue: Stone Mountain Park Velodrome
- Date: 24 July
- Competitors: 20 from 20 nations
- Winning time: 1:02.712 OR

Medalists
1st place, gold medalist(s)		Florian Rousseau; France
2nd place, silver medalist(s)		Erin Hartwell; United States
3rd place, bronze medalist(s)		Takanobu Jumonji; Japan

The men's track time trial in Cycling at the 1996 Summer Olympics was a time trial race in which each of the twenty cyclists attempted to set the fastest time for four laps (1 kilometre) of the track. The race was held on Wednesday, July 24, 1996 at the Stone Mountain Velodrome. There were 20 competitors from 20 nations, with each nation limited to one cyclist. The event was won by Florian Rousseau of France, the nation's first victory in the men's track trial since 1968 and fourth overall (most of any nation, leading multiple others by two). Erin Hartwell of the United States took silver, becoming the fourth man to win multiple medals in the event. Japan won its first track time trial medal with Takanobu Jumonji's bronze.

== Background ==
This was the 17th appearance of the event, which had previously been held in 1896 and every Games since 1928. It would be held every Games until being dropped from the programme after 2004. The returning cyclists from 1992 were silver medalist Shane Kelly of Australia, bronze medalist Erin Hartwell of the United States, eighth-place finisher Gene Samuel of Trinidad and Tobago, ninth-place finisher Dirk Jan van Hameren of the Netherlands, twelfth-place finisher Aleksandr Kirichenko of the Unified Team (also the 1988 gold medalist for the Soviet Union, and now competing for Russia), thirteenth-place finisher Christian Meidlinger of Austria, and twentieth-place finisher Grzegorz Krejner of Poland. Kelly was the reigning world champion and world record holder, as well. Kelly and two-time (1993 and 1994) world champion Florian Rousseau of France were the favorites.

Russia and Ukraine each made their debut in the men's track time trial. France made its 17th appearance, the only nation to have competed at every appearance of the event.

== Competition format ==
The event was a time trial on the track, with each cyclist competing separately to attempt to achieve the fastest time. Each cyclist raced one kilometre from a standing start.

== Records ==
The following were the world and Olympic records prior to the competition.

World record	Shane Kelly (AUS)	1:00.613	Bogotá, Colombia	26 September 1995
Olympic record	Lothar Thoms (GDR)	1:02.955	Moscow, Soviet Union	22 July 1980

Erin Hartwell broke the Olympic record with a time of 1:02.940. Florian Rousseau later bettered that, finishing in 1:02.712.

== Schedule ==
All times are Eastern Daylight Time (UTC-4)

Date	Time	Round
Wednesday, 24 July 1996	11:20	Final

== Results ==
Hartwell's Olympic-record race gave him the lead until the last two riders, favorites Rousseau and Kelly (guaranteeing Hartwell a rare second medal to add to his 1992 bronze). Rousseau outdid Hartwell's time, dropping the Olympic record further. Kelly, however, had his foot slip from his toe clip shortly after starting and did not finish.

Rank	Cyclist	Nation	250 m	500 m	750 m	Time	Notes
1st place, gold medalist(s)	Florian Rousseau	France	18.709	32.549	47.014	1:02.712	OR
2nd place, silver medalist(s)	Erin Hartwell	United States	18.892	33.059	47.616	1:02.940	
3rd place, bronze medalist(s)	Takanobu Jumonji	Japan	18.725	32.632	47.315	1:03.261	
4	Soeren Lausberg	Germany	19.403	33.208	47.743	1:03.514	
5	Jean-Pierre van Zyl	South Africa	18.975	33.049	47.959	1:04.214	
6	Grzegorz Krejner	Poland	19.472	33.482	48.481	1:04.697	
7	Dimitrios Georgalis	Greece	19.654	33.877	48.876	1:04.995	
8	Ainārs Ķiksis	Latvia	19.341	33.510	48.902	1:05.457	
9	Christian Meidlinger	Austria	19.453	34.256	49.424	1:05.530	
10	Gene Samuel	Trinidad and Tobago	19.277	33.644	49.082	1:05.553	
11	Bogdan Bondariew	Ukraine	20.771	35.230	50.002	1:05.658	
12	Dirk Jan van Hameren	Netherlands	19.401	33.709	49.061	1:05.886	
13	José Antonio Escuredo	Spain	19.828	34.078	49.339	1:05.994	
14	Darren McKenzie Potter	New Zealand	19.568	34.311	49.870	1:06.311	
15	Gianluca Capitano	Italy	19.878	34.179	49.538	1:06.408	
16	Shaun Wallace	Great Britain	19.767	34.590	50.068	1:06.456	
17	Ángel Colla	Argentina	19.774	34.417	49.897	1:06.619	
18	Aleksandr Kirichenko	Russia	19.446	34.218	49.987	1:07.013	
19	Hong Seok-han	South Korea	19.591	34.367	50.118	1:07.099	
—	Shane Kelly	Australia	—			DNF	
