= Frece =

Frece or de Frece is a surname. Notable people with the surname include:

- Lauri de Frece (1880–1921), English actor and singer
- Richard Frece (born 1975), Austrian diver
- Walter de Frece (1870–1935), British theatre impresario and politician
