= Rob Harbison =

American sports shooter

Personal information
- Born: June 27, 1966 (age 60) Fallston, Maryland, United States

Sport
- Sport: Sport shooting
Medal record
Representing United States
Pan American Games
Gold medal – first place	1995 Mar del Plata	50m rifle prone
Gold medal – first place	1995 Mar del Plata	50m rifle 3 positions
Gold medal – first place	1995 Mar del Plata	10m air rifle team
World Shooting Championships
Bronze medal – third place	2006 Zagreb	300m rifle 3 positions team

Rob Harbison (born June 27, 1966) is an American sport shooter. He competed at the 1996 Summer Olympics in the men's 50 metre rifle three positions event, in which he placed sixth, and the men's 10 metre air rifle event, in which he placed seventh.
