= Patrice Lhotellier =

French fencer (born 1966)

Personal information
- Born: 8 August 1966 (age 59) Romilly-sur-Seine, France

Sport
- Sport: Fencing
Medal record
Men's fencing
Representing France
Olympic Games
Gold medal – first place	2000 Sydney	Foil, team

Patrice Lhotellier (born 8 August 1966) is a French fencer. He won a gold medal in the team foil event at the 2000 Summer Olympics in Sydney, Athens, together with Jean-Noël Ferrari, Brice Guyart and Lionel Plumenail.
