= Franck Boidin =

French fencer (born 1972)

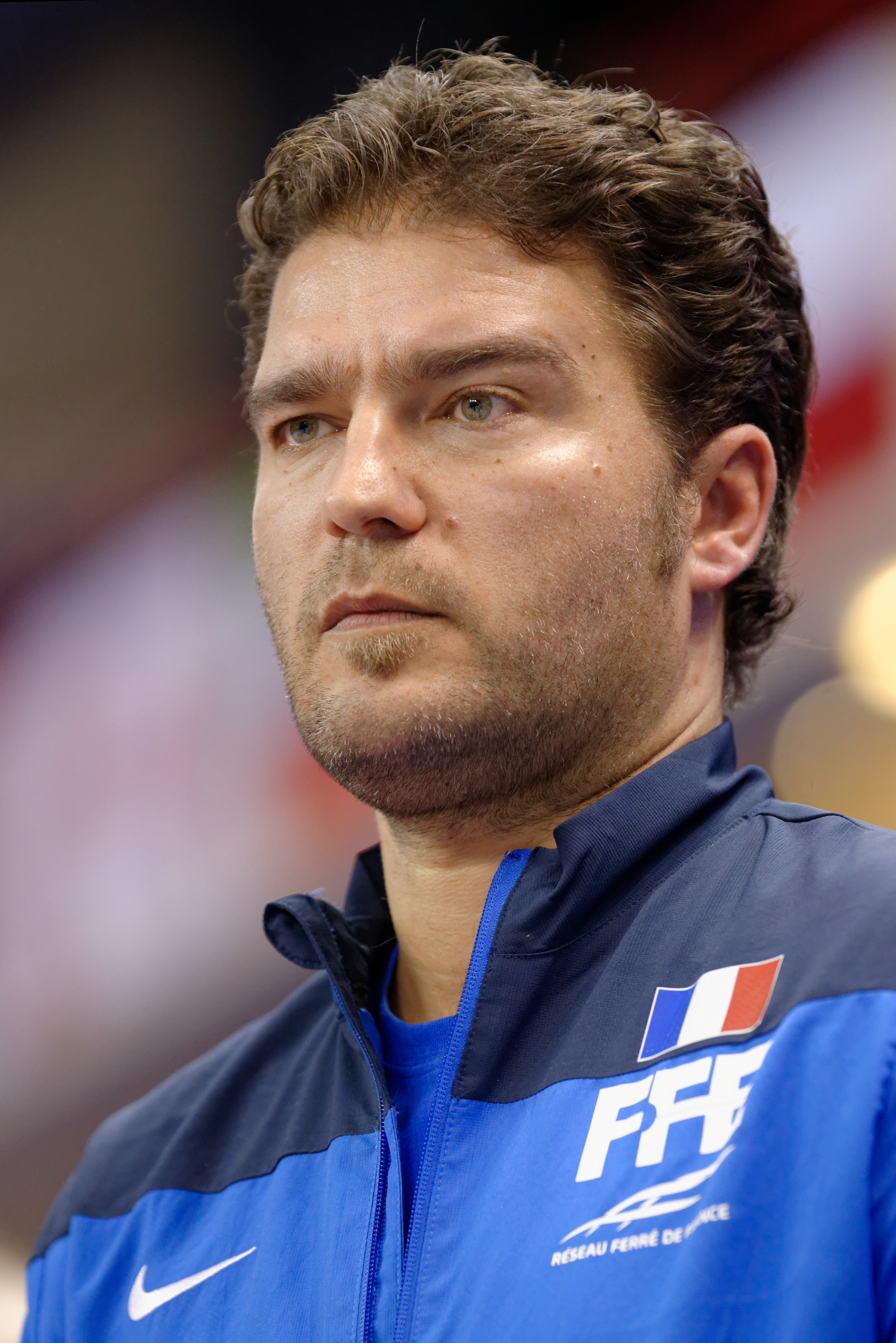

Personal information
- Born: 28 August 1972 (age 53) Hénin-Beaumont, Pas-de-Calais, France
- Height: 1.88 m (6 ft 2 in)
- Weight: 80 kg (180 lb)

Fencing career
- Sport: Fencing
- Country: France
- Weapon: Foil
- Hand: Right-handed
- Retired: 2004
- FIE ranking: archive
Medal record
Men's Foil
Representing France
Olympic Games
Bronze medal – third place	1996 Atlanta	Individual
World Championships
Gold medal – first place	1997 Cape Town	Team
Gold medal – first place	2001 Nîmes	Team
Silver medal – second place	2002 Lisbon	Team
Bronze medal – third place	2001 Nîmes	Individual
European Championships
Silver medal – second place	1999 Bolzano	Team

Franck Boidin (born 28 August 1972) is a French foil fencer. He won an individual bronze medal at the 1996 Summer Olympics and in the 2001 World Championships. He is also twice team World champion (1997 and 2001).

After his retirement from competition Boidin became coordinator of the foil Youth Development Centre in Châtenay-Malabry. In 2008 he was named national coach for the French women's foil team. After the 2012 Summer Olympics he took responsibility over both the men's and women's foil teams.
