= Alessandro Puccini =

Italian fencer (born 1968)

Personal information
- Born: 28 August 1968 (age 58) Cascina, Pisa, Italy

Sport
- Sport: Fencing
Medal record
Men's fencing
Representing Italy
Olympic Games
Gold medal – first place	1996 Atlanta	Individual foil
World Championships
Gold medal – first place	1990 Essen	Team foil
Gold medal – first place	1994 Athens	Team foil
Silver medal – second place	1993 Essen	Team foil
Silver medal – second place	1994 Athens	Individual foil
Bronze medal – third place	1997 Cape Town	Team foil
Summer Universiade
Gold medal – first place	1991 Sheffield	Team foil
Silver medal – second place	1991 Sheffield	Individual foil
Silver medal – second place	1993 Buffalo	Team foil
Bronze medal – third place	1993 Buffalo	Individual foil
Mediterranean Games
Gold medal – first place	1993 Languedoc	Individual foil
Bronze medal – third place	1997 Bari	Individual foil

Alessandro Puccini (born 28 August 1968) is an Italian fencer and Olympic champion in foil competition.

He competed at the 1992 Summer Olympics and he won a gold medal in the individual foil event at the 1996 Summer Olympics in Atlanta.
