= Michael Douglass (sport shooter) =

American sports shooter

Personal information
- Nationality: American
- Born: May 1, 1976 (age 50) Portsmouth, Virginia, United States

Sport
- Sport: Sports shooting

Michael Douglass (born May 1, 1976) is an American sports shooter. He competed in the men's 10 metre air pistol event at the 2000 Summer Olympics.
