= Stéphane Gagne =

French sports shooter

Stéphane Gagne (born February 16, 1969, in Saint-Vallier, Saône-et-Loire) is a French sport shooter. He competed at the 2000 Summer Olympics in the men's 50 metre pistol event, in which he placed 26th, and the men's 10 metre air pistol event, in which he placed fifth.
