= Antonella Bragaglia =

Italian volleyball player (born 1973)

Personal information
- Nationality: Italian
- Born: 4 February 1973 (age 53)
- Height: 1.84 m (6 ft 0 in)
- Weight: 76 kg (168 lb)

National team
| 2000 | Italy |

Antonella Bragaglia (born 4 February 1973) is an Italian former volleyball player. She was part of the Italy women's national volleyball team.

She competed with the national team at the 2000 Summer Olympics in Sydney, Australia, finishing 9th.

== See also ==
- Italy at the 2000 Summer Olympics
