= Ana Paula de Tassis =

Italian volleyball player (born 1965)

Personal information
- Nationality: Italian
- Born: 5 January 1965 (age 61); Governador Valadares, Minas Gerais
- Height: 1.79 m (5 ft 10 in)
- Weight: 73 kg (161 lb)

National team
2000	Italy

Ana Paula de Tassis (born 5 January 1965) is a Brazilian-born Italian female volleyball player.

She was part of the Italy women's national volleyball team. She competed with the national team at the 2000 Summer Olympics in Sydney, Australia, finishing 9th.

== See also ==
- Italy at the 2000 Summer Olympics
