= Georgy Nekhaev =

Belarusian sport shooter

Georgy Nekhaev (born May 6, 1960 in Gomel) is a Belarusian sport shooter. He competed in rifle shooting events at the Summer Olympics in 1996 and 2000.

== Olympic results ==
Event	1996	2000
50 metre rifle prone (men)	T-30th	T-19th
10 metre air rifle (men)	T-26th	T-18th
