= Hamad Al-Hammadi =

Emirati footballer (born 1991)

Personal information
- Full name: Hamad Mohammed Al-Hammadi
- Date of birth: 12 February 1991 (age 35)
- Place of birth: United Arab Emirates
- Height: 1.78 m (5 ft 10 in)
- Position: Defender

Youth career
- Al Dhafra

Senior career*
Years	Team	Apps	(Gls)
2010–2012	Al Dhafra		
2012–2015	Al Jazira		
2015–2018	Al Dhafra		
2018–2019	Ittihad Kalba		
2019–2021	Al-Wasl		
2021	Ajman		
- * Club domestic league appearances and goals

Hamad Al-Hammadi (Arabic: حمد الحمادي; born 12 February 1991) is an Emirati footballer who plays as a defender.
