= Jue-Fen Sun =

Italian softball player (born 1964)

Jue-Fen Sun (born 16 November 1964) is an Italian softball player who competed in the 2000 Summer Olympics.
