= Liu Yinqing =

Chinese fencer

Personal information
- Born: 8 February 1976 (age 50)

Sport
- Sport: Fencing
Medal record
Women's fencing
Representing China
Olympic Games
Bronze medal – third place	2000 Sydney	Épée, team

Liu Yinqing (simplified Chinese: 刘银清; traditional Chinese: 劉銀清; pinyin: Liú Yínqīng; born 15 September 1974) is a Chinese fencer.
