= Jean-Noël Ferrari =

French fencer (born 1974)

Personal information
- Born: 7 September 1974 (age 51) Nice, France

Sport
- Sport: Fencing
Medal record
Men's fencing
Representing France
Olympic Games
Gold medal – first place	2000 Sydney	Foil, team

Jean-Noël Ferrari (born 7 September 1974 in Nice) is a French fencer. He won a gold medal in team foil at the 2000 Summer Olympics in Sydney, together with Lionel Plumenail, Brice Guyart and Patrice Lhotellier.

== Olympic results ==
Year	Event	Result
2000	Individual Men's Foil	4th
2000	Team Men's Foil	1st
2004	Team Men's Foil	5th
