= Peter Devine (fencer) =

American fencer (born 1976)

Personal information
- Born: May 7, 1976 (age 50) New York, New York, United States

Sport
- Sport: Fencing

Peter Devine (born May 17, 1976) is an American fencer. He competed in the individual and team foil events at the 1996 Summer Olympics.
