= Sabrina Comberlato =

Italian softball player (born 1969)

Sabrina Comberlato (born 19 July 1969) is an Italian softball player who competed in the 2000 Summer Olympics.
