= Verusca Paternoster =

Italian softball player (born 1972)

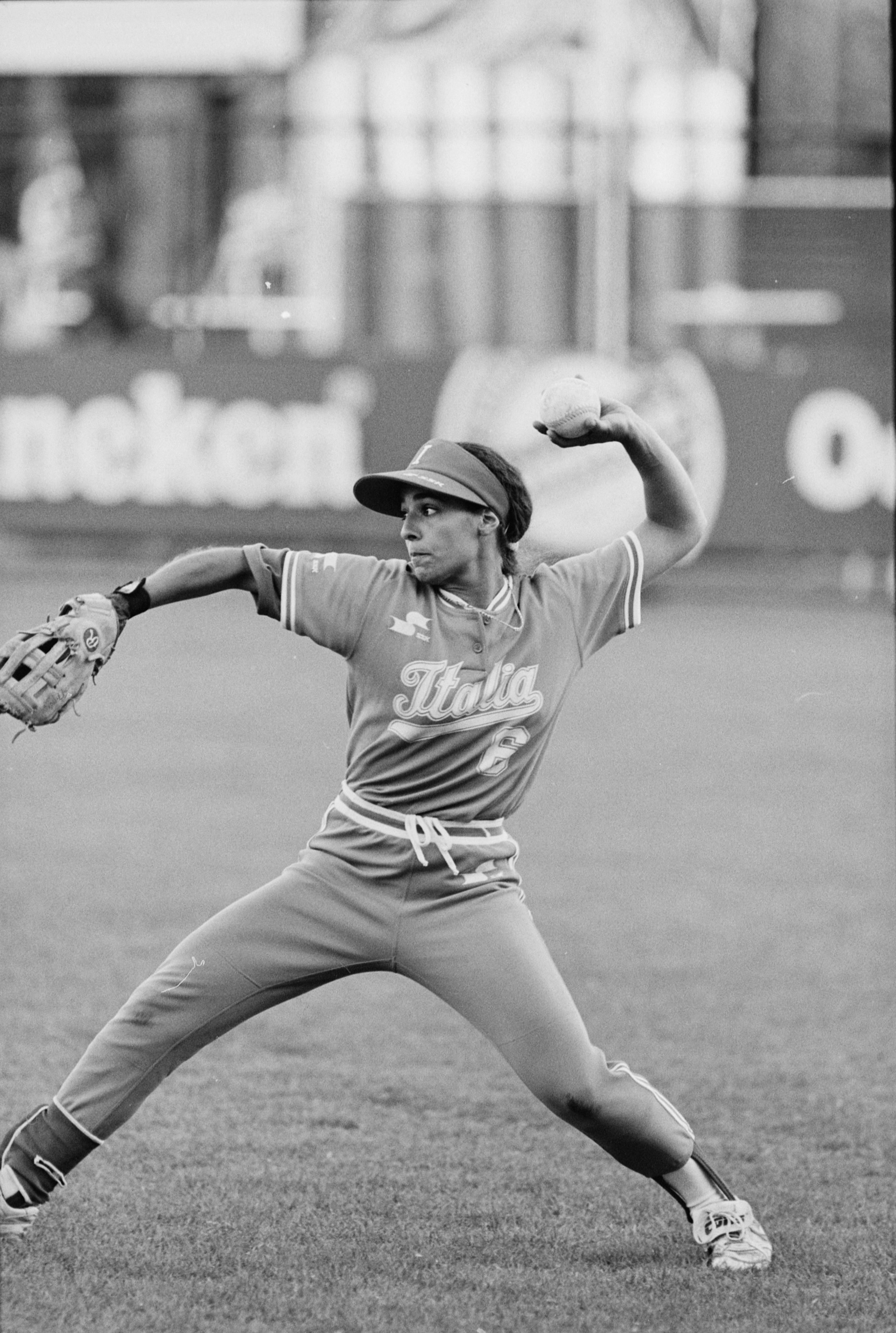
Verusca Paternoster (1995)

Verusca Paternoster (born 6 October 1972) is an Italian softball player who competed in the 2000 Summer Olympics.
