= Ernst Denifl =

Austrian cyclist

Personal information
- Born: 4 January 1962 (age 64) Hall in Tirol, Austria

Cycling career
- Sport: Cycling

Ernst Denifl (born 4 January 1962) is an Austrian former cyclist. He competed in the men's cross-country mountain biking event at the 1996 Summer Olympics.
