= David Hausmann =

German fencer

Personal information
- Born: 5 April 1979 (age 45)

Sport
- Sport: Fencing

David Hausmann (born 5 April 1979) is a German fencer. He competed in the team foil events at the 2000 Summer Olympics.
