= Rafkat Ruziyev =

Uzbekistani fencer

Personal information
- Born: 25 July 1973 (age 52)

Sport
- Sport: Fencing

Rafkat Ruziyev (born 25 July 1973) is an Uzbekistani fencer. He competed in the individual foil event at the 1996 Summer Olympics.
