= Marco Martins (fencer) =

Brazilian fencer

Personal information
- Born: 1 June 1973 (age 53)

Sport
- Sport: Fencing

Marco Martins (born 1 June 1973 in São Paulo, Brazil) is a Brazilian fencer. He competed in the individual foil event at the 2000 Summer Olympics.
