= Florian Schneeberger =

Austrian sailor (1971–2026)

Personal information
- Nationality: Austrian
- Born: 13 March 1971 Erlangen, Bavaria, West Germany
- Died: 20 April 2026 (aged 55) Salzburg, Austria
- Height: 190 cm (6 ft 3 in)

Sport
- Sport: Sailing
- Event: Tornado
Medal record
European Championship
Gold medal – first place	1996 Attersee
Silver medal – second place	1995 Kiel
Silver medal – second place	1993 Helsinki

Florian Schneeberger (13 March 1971 – 20 April 2026) was an Austrian sailor. He competed in the Tornado event at the 1996 Summer Olympics together with Andreas Hagara.

Schneeberger died in a bus accident in Salzburg, when a trolleybus crashed into a supermarket, on 20 April 2026, at the age of 55.
