= Aleksandr Lakatosh =

Russian fencer

Personal information
- Born: 9 April 1974 (age 52) St. Petersburg, Russia

Sport
- Sport: Fencing

Aleksandr Lakatosh (born 9 April 1974) is a Russian fencer. He competed in the team foil event at the 2000 Summer Olympics.
