= Clelia Ailara =

Italian softball player (born 1972)

Personal information
- Nationality: Italian
- Born: April 30, 1972 (age 53) Italy

Sport
- Sport: softball

Achievements and titles
- Olympic finals: 2000 Summer Olympics

Clelia Ailara (born 30 April 1972) is an Italian softball player who competed in the 2000 Summer Olympics.
