= Giovanna Palermi =

Italian softball player (born 1964)

Personal information
- Nationality: Italian
- Born: 15 January 1964 (age 61); Rome, Italy

Sport
- Country: Italy
- Sport: Softball
- Event: Women's team
- Retired: 2015

Giovanna Palermi (born 15 January 1964) is an Italian softball player who competed in the 2000 Summer Olympics.
