= Ding Yi (table tennis) =

Austrian table tennis player

Ding Yi (Chinese: 丁毅; pinyin: Dīng Yì, born 14 January 1959 in Shanghai, China) is a Chinese-born table tennis player who represented Austria at the 1988, 1992, 1996, and 2000 Olympics.

== Sources ==
- "Yi Ding Bio, Stats, and Results". Sports Reference. Archived from the original on 2020-04-18.
