= Franz Urlesberger =

Austrian sailor

Personal information
- Nationality: Austrian
- Born: 26 October 1972 (age 52); Salzburg, Austria

Sport
- Sport: Sailing

Franz Urlesberger (born 26 October 1972) is an Austrian sailor. He competed in the Laser event at the 1996 Summer Olympics.
