= Marina Cergol =

Italian softball player (born 1965)

Marina Cergol (born 21 June 1965 in Trieste) is an Italian softball player who competed in the 2000 Summer Olympics.
