= Qian Qianli =

Austrian table tennis player

Qian Qianli (Chinese: 钱千里; pinyin: Qián Qiānlǐ, born 7 February 1965) is a Chinese-born table tennis player who represented Austria at the 1996 Summer Olympics.
