= Chung Soo-ki =

South Korean fencer

Personal information
- Nationality: South Korea
- Born: 11 June 1971 (age 55)

Sport
- Sport: Fencing

- Chung Soo-ki
- Hangul: 정수기
- Hanja: 鄭守基
- RR: Jeong Sugi
- MR: Chŏng Sugi

Chung Soo-ki (Korean: 정수기; born 11 June 1971) is a South Korean fencer. He competed in the individual and team foil events at the 1996 Summer Olympics.
