= Maher Ben Aziza =

Tunisian fencer (born 1980)

Personal information
- Born: 27 July 1980 (age 45)

Sport
- Sport: Fencing

Maher Ben Aziza (born 27 July 1980) is a Tunisian fencer. He competed in the individual foil events at the 2000 and 2004 Summer Olympics.
