= Paolo Ranno =

Italian sports shooter

Personal information
- Nationality: Italian
- Born: 23 February 1966 (age 60) Melilli, Italy

Sport
- Sport: Sports shooting

Paolo Ranno (born 23 February 1966) is an Italian sports shooter. He competed in the men's 10 metre air pistol event at the 2000 Summer Olympics.
