= Gerald McMahon =

Australian fencer

Personal information
- Born: 13 May 1957 (age 69) Nannup, Western Australia, Australia

Sport
- Sport: Fencing

Gerald McMahon (born 13 May 1957) is an Australian fencer. He competed in the individual foil event at the 2000 Summer Olympics.
