= Dieter Grabner =

Austrian sports shooter

Personal information
- Nationality: Austrian
- Born: 8 June 1972 (age 53)

Sport
- Sport: Sports shooting

Dieter Grabner (born 8 June 1972) is an Austrian sports shooter. He competed in the men's 10 metre air rifle event at the 1996 Summer Olympics.
