= Alessandra Gorla =

Italian softball player (born 1975)

Alessandra Gorla (born 1 November 1975) is an Italian softball player who competed in the 2000 Summer Olympics.
