= Jie Hua =

Italian softball player (born 1963)

- Born: November 1, 1963 (age 61); Italy
- Occupation: Softball player

Jie Hua (born 1 November 1963) is an Italian softball player who competed in the 2000 Summer Olympics.
