= Vladislav Pavlovich =

Russian fencer (born 1971)

Personal information
- Full name: Vladislav Yuryevich Pavlovich
- Born: 17 March 1971 (age 55) Moscow, Russian SFSR, Soviet Union
Medal record
Men's fencing
Representing Russia
Olympic Games
Gold medal – first place	1996 Atlanta	Team foil

Vladislav Yuryevich Pavlovich (Russian: Владислав Юрьевич Павлович, also spelled Pavlovitch, born 17 March 1971) is a former Russian fencer, who won a gold Olympic medal in the team foil competition at the 1996 Summer Olympics in Atlanta.
