= João Gomes (fencer) =

Portuguese fencer (born 1975)

Personal information
- Born: 12 July 1975 (age 50) Lisbon, Portugal

Sport
- Sport: Fencing

João Gomes (born 12 July 1975) is a Portuguese fencer who competed in the individual foil events at the 2000 and 2004 Summer Olympics.
