= Márk Marsi =

Hungarian fencer

Personal information
- Born: 17 August 1973 (age 53) Budapest, Hungary

Sport
- Sport: Fencing

Márk Marsi (born 17 August 1973) is a Hungarian épée and foil fencer. He competed at the 1996 and 2000 Summer Olympics.
