= Lionel Plumenail =

French fencer (born 1967)

Personal information
- Born: 22 January 1967 (age 59) Bordeaux, France

Sport
- Sport: Fencing
Medal record
Representing France
Olympic Games
Gold medal – first place	2000 Sydney	Team foil
Silver medal – second place	1996 Atlanta	Individual foil
World Championships
Gold medal – first place	1997 Cape Town	Team sabre
Gold medal – first place	1999 Seoul	Team sabre
Silver medal – second place	1998 La Chaux-de-Fonds	Team foil
Bronze medal – third place	1997 Cape Town	Individual foil
Summer Universiade
Bronze medal – third place	1993 Buffalo	Individual foil

Lionel Plumenail (born 22 January 1967) is a French fencer. He won a gold medal in the team foil at the 2000 Summer Olympics in Sydney, together with Jean-Noël Ferrari, Brice Guyart and Patrice Lhotellier. He also won a silver medal in the individual foil at the 1996 Summer Olympics.
