= Christian Meidlinger =

Austrian cyclist

Personal information
- Born: 5 September 1971 (age 55) Vienna, Austria

Cycling career
- Sport: Cycling

Christian Meidlinger (born 5 September 1971) is an Austrian former cyclist. He competed at the 1992 Summer Olympics and the 1996 Summer Olympics.
