= Dong Zhaozhi =

Chinese fencer (born 1973)

Personal information
- Born: 16 November 1973 (age 52) Guangzhou, Guangdong, China

Sport
- Sport: Fencing
Medal record
Men's fencing
Representing China
Olympic Games
Silver medal – second place	2000 Sydney	team foil
Silver medal – second place	2004 Athens	team foil

Dong Zhaozhi (Chinese: 董兆致; pinyin: Dǒng Zhàozhì; Cantonese Yale: Dung2 Siu6 Ji3; born 16 November 1973 in Guangzhou, Guangdong) is a left handed male Chinese foil fencer. He competed in the 1996 Summer Olympics, the 2000 Summer Olympics, and the 2004 Summer Olympics.

In 1996, he was eliminated in the first round of the Olympic foil tournament and finished ninth with the Chinese foil team in the team event.

Four years later, he won the silver medal as part of the Chinese foil team. In the 2000 Olympic foil tournament he was eliminated in the first round again.

In 2004, he won the silver medal again as a member of the Chinese foil team. In the individual Olympic foil tournament he was eliminated in the first round again. Since then, he lives in Guangzhou with his daughter and wife, and has not competed again.
