= Gabriele Magni =

Italian fencer (born 1973)

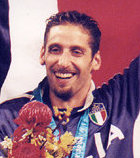

Personal information
- Born: 3 December 1973 (age 52) Pistoia, Italy

Sport
- Sport: Fencing
- Club: Fiamme Oro
Medal record
Men's fencing
Representing Italy
Olympic Games
Bronze medal – third place	2000 Sydney	Foil, team

Gabriele Magni (born 3 December 1973) is an Italian former fencer. He won a bronze medal in the team foil event at the 2000 Summer Olympics.
