= Richard Frece =

Austrian diver

Personal information
- Nationality: Austrian
- Born: 9 August 1975 (age 49); Vienna, Austria

Sport
- Sport: Diving

Richard Frece (born 9 August 1975) is an Austrian diver. He competed at the 1996 Summer Olympics and the 2000 Summer Olympics.
