= Javier García (fencer) =

Spanish fencer

Personal information
- Full name: Javier García Delgado
- Born: 10 September 1976 (age 49) La Bañeza, Spain

Sport
- Sport: Fencing
Medal record
Mediterranean Games
Silver medal – second place	1997 Bari	Individual foil

Javier García Delgado (Note: In this Spanish name, the first or paternal surname is García and the second or maternal family name is Delgado.) (born 10 September 1976) is a Spanish fencer. He competed in the individual foil event at the 1996 Summer Olympics and won a silver medal in the individual foil event at the 1997 Mediterranean Games.
