= Richard Breutner =

German fencer

Personal information
- Born: 10 September 1979 (age 46) Johannesburg, South Africa

Sport
- Sport: Fencing

Richard Breutner (born 10 September 1979) is a German fencer. He competed in the individual and team foil events at the 2000 Summer Olympics. He won a silver medal in the men's team foil event at the 2006 World Fencing Championships.
