= Marco Falchetto =

Austrian fencer

Personal information
- Born: 22 December 1973 (age 52) Vienna, Austria

Sport
- Sport: Fencing

Marco Falchetto (born 22 December 1973) is an Austrian fencer. He competed in the foil events at the 1996 Summer Olympics.
