= Alfredo Pérez (fencer) =

Venezuelan fencer

Personal information
- Born: 11 March 1972 (age 54)

Sport
- Sport: Fencing

Alfredo Pérez (born 11 March 1972) is a Venezuelan fencer who competed in the individual and team foil events at the 1996 Summer Olympics.
