= Oleksiy Kruhliak =

Ukrainian fencer

Personal information
- Born: 9 December 1975
- Died: 16 May 2017 (aged 41)

Sport
- Sport: Fencing

Oleksiy Kruhliak (9 December 1975 – 16 May 2017) was a Ukrainian fencer. He competed in the individual and team foil events at the 2000 Summer Olympics.
