= Ralf Bißdorf =

German fencer (born 1971)

Personal information
- Nationality: German
- Born: 15 March 1971 (age 55) Heidenheim an der Brenz, West Germany

Sport
- Country: Germany
- Sport: Fencing
- Event: Men's Foil
Medal record
Men's fencing
Representing Germany
Olympic Games
Silver medal – second place	2000 Sydney	Foil, individual

Ralf Bißdorf (born 15 March 1971) is a German former fencer. He won a silver medal in the individual foil event at the 2000 Summer Olympics.

He is currently the women's foil national coach for USA Fencing, and an assistant fencing coach for the Boston College Eagles.
