= Leandro Marchetti =

Argentine fencer (born 1974)

Personal information
- Born: 20 December 1974 (age 51) Rosario, Santa Fe, Argentina

Sport
- Sport: Fencing
Medal record
Representing Argentina
Pan American Games
Bronze medal – third place	1995 Mar del Plata	Individual foil
Bronze medal – third place	1995 Mar del Plata	Team foil

Leandro Cristian Marchetti (born 20 December 1974) is an Argentine fencer. He competed in the individual foil events at the 1996 and 2000 Summer Olympics.
