= Daniele Crosta =

Italian fencer (born 1970)

Personal information
- Born: 5 May 1970 (age 56) Busto Arsizio, Italy

Sport
- Sport: Fencing
Medal record
Men's fencing
Representing Italy
Olympic Games
Bronze medal – third place	2000 Sydney	Foil, team

Daniele Crosta (born 5 May 1970) is an Italian fencer. He won a bronze medal in the team foil event at the 2000 Summer Olympics.
