= Matteo Zennaro =

Italian fencer (born 1976)

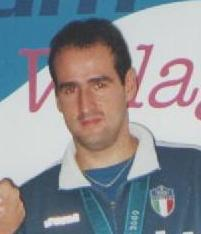
- Matteo Zennaro in 2014.

Personal information
- Born: 30 April 1976 (age 50) Venice, Italy

Sport
- Sport: Fencing
Medal record
Men's fencing
Representing Italy
Olympic Games
Bronze medal – third place	2000 Sydney	Foil, team

Matteo Zennaro (born 30 April 1976) is an Italian fencer. He won a bronze medal in the team foil event at the 2000 Summer Olympics.

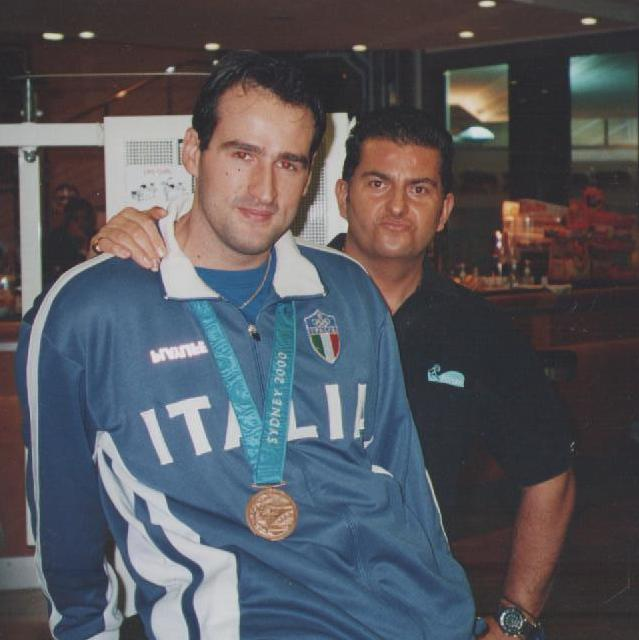
Matteo Zennaro (left) with his personal trainer Paolo Tassetto (right), 2000.

]During and after the rehabilitation, the sports periodization of the strength training is done under the guide of the strength coach, Master Paolo Tassetto.
