= Oleksii Bryzghalov =

Ukrainian fencer (born 1971)

Personal information
- Born: 26 July 1971 (age 54)
- Height: 1.76 m (5 ft 9 in)
- Weight: 74 kg (163 lb)

Fencing career
- Sport: Fencing
- Weapon: foil
Medal record
Men's fencing
Representing Ukraine
Summer Universiade
Gold medal – first place	1997 Sicily	Team foil
Silver medal – second place	1997 Sicily	Individual foil

Oleksii Bryzghalov (Ukrainian: Олексій Олегович Бризгалов; born 26 July 1971) is a Ukrainian fencer. He competed in the foil events at the 1996 and 2000 Summer Olympics. He is now a foil referee for the International Fencing Federation.
