= Brice Guyart =

French fencer (born 1981)

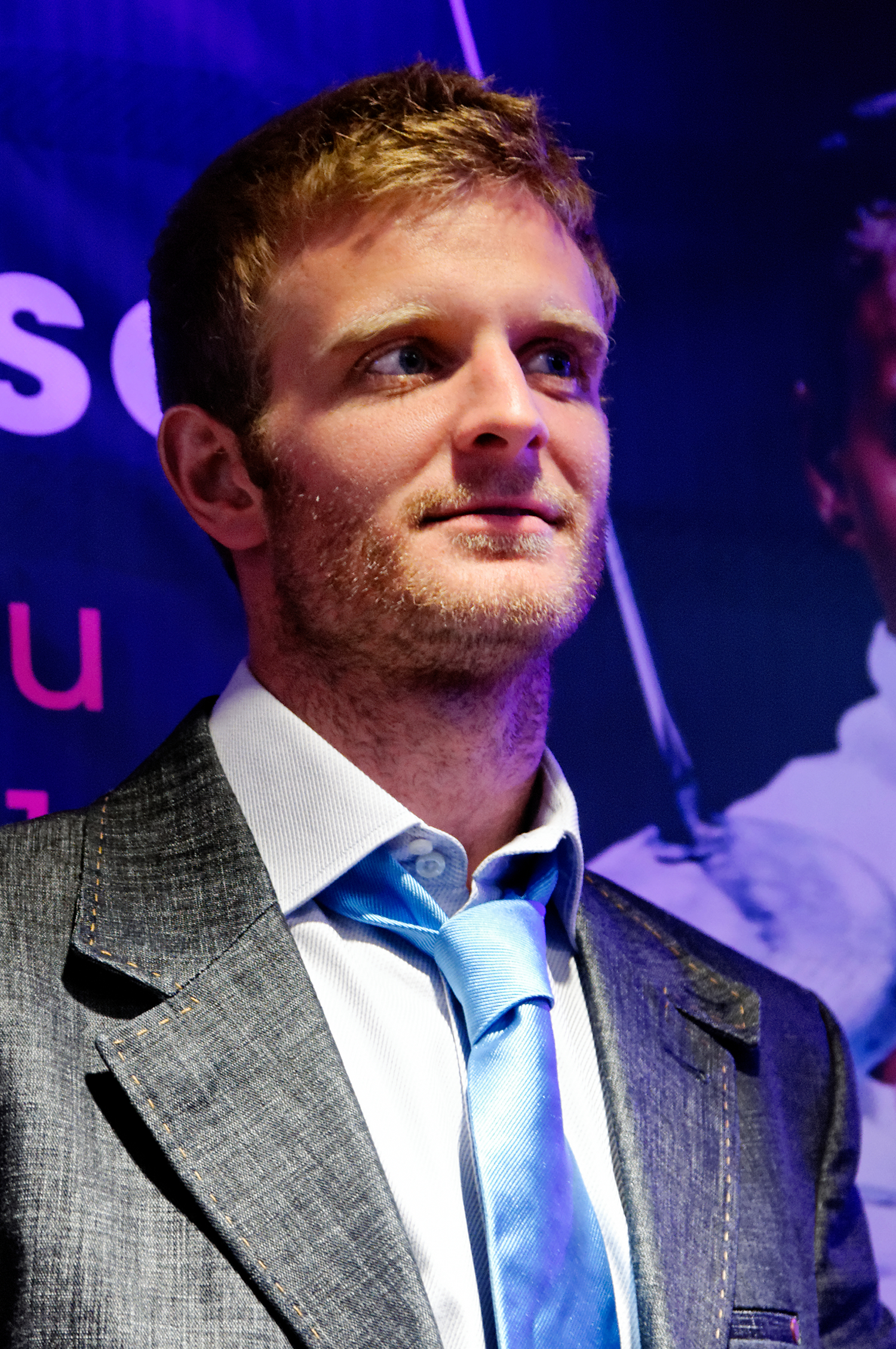
- Guyart in 2012

Personal information
- Born: 15 March 1981 (age 45) Suresnes, France

Sport
- Sport: Fencing
Medal record
Men's fencing
Representing France
Olympic Games
Gold medal – first place	2000 Sydney	Team foil
Gold medal – first place	2004 Athens	Individual foil
World Championships
Gold medal – first place	2001 Nîmes	Team foil
Gold medal – first place	2005 Leipzig	Team foil
Gold medal – first place	2007 Moscow	Team foil
Silver medal – second place	2002 Lisbonne	Team foil
Silver medal – second place	2011 Catania	Team foil
Bronze medal – third place	2003 Havana	Individual foil
European Championships
Gold medal – first place	2006 Izmir	Team foil
Silver medal – second place	2011 Sheffield	Team foil
Silver medal – second place	2012 Legnano	Team foil
Bronze medal – third place	2006 Izmir	Individual foil

Brice Guyart (born 15 March 1981 in Suresnes) is a foil fencer from France. He won a gold medal in the team foil event at the 2000 Summer Olympics and a gold in the individual foil at the 2004 Summer Olympics. He is the older brother of Astrid Guyart.

== Honours ==
- 2000 – Team Olympic Champion
- 2001 – Team World Champion with France
- 2001 – World Bronze Medal
- 2003 – World Bronze Medal
- 2004 – Olympic Champion
- 2005 – Team World Champion
