= Fencing at the 1992 Summer Olympics – Men's foil =

Fencing at the Olympics

Men's foil at the Games of the XXV Olympiad
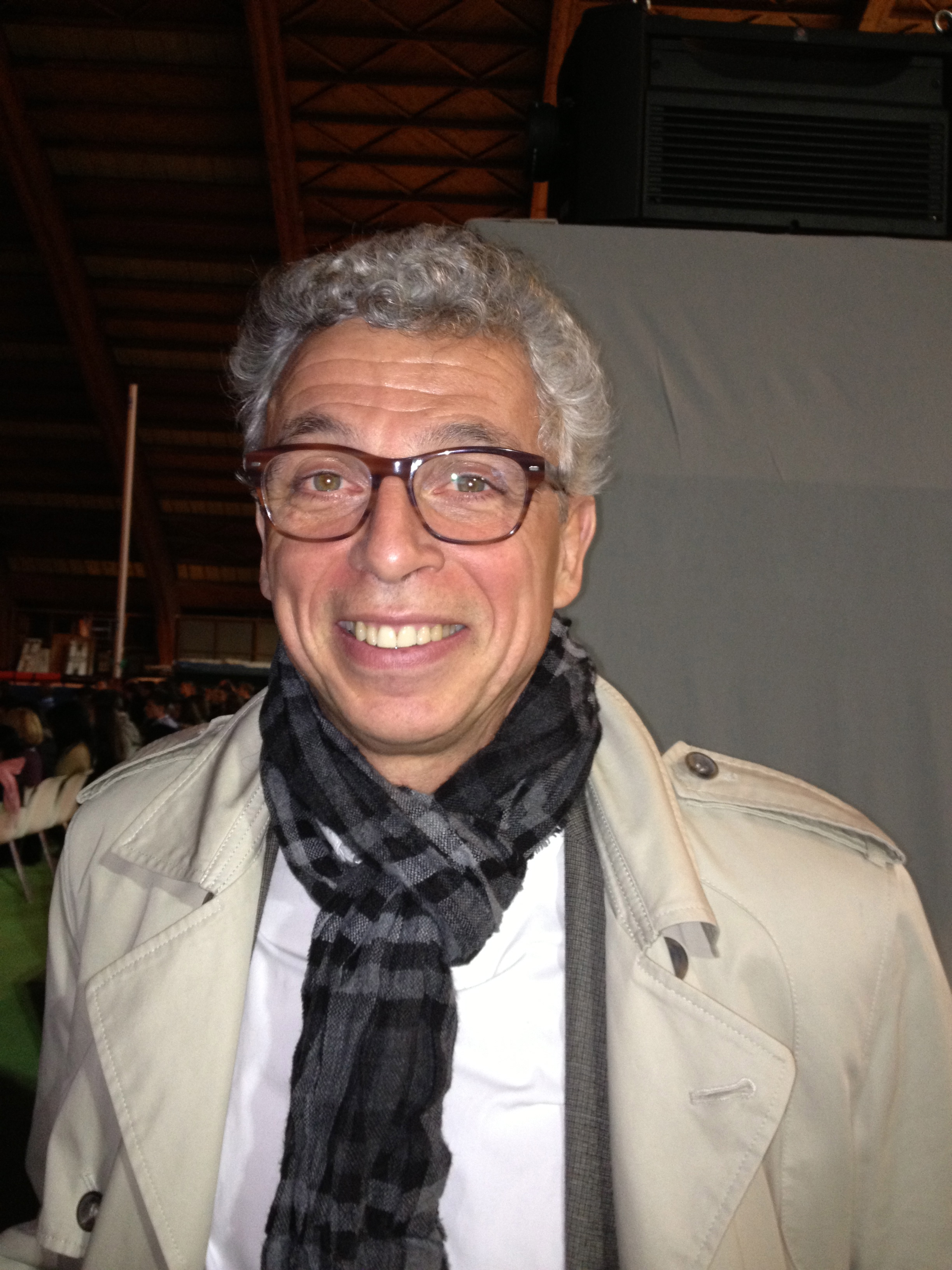
- Philippe Omnès (2012)
- Venue: Palau de la Metal·lúrgia
- Dates: 31 July 1992
- Competitors: 59 from 25 nations

Medalists
1st place, gold medalist(s)		Philippe Omnès	France
2nd place, silver medalist(s)		Serhiy Holubytskiy	Unified Team
3rd place, bronze medalist(s)		Elvis Gregory	Cuba

The men's foil was one of eight fencing events on the fencing at the 1992 Summer Olympics programme. It was the twenty-first appearance of the event. The competition was held on 31 July 1992. 59 fencers from 25 nations competed. Nations had been limited to three fencers each since 1928. The event was won by Philippe Omnès of France, the nation's first victory in the men's foil since 1956 and eighth overall (passing Italy for most all-time). Serhiy Holubytskiy of the Unified Team took silver. Elvis Gregory earned Cuba's first medal in the event in 88 years with his bronze.

== Background ==
This was the 21st appearance of the event, which has been held at every Summer Olympics except 1908 (when there was a foil display only rather than a medal event). Five of the eight quarterfinalists from 1988 returned: gold medalist (and 1984 bronze medalist) Stefano Cerioni of Italy, silver medalist Udo Wagner of East Germany, fourth-place finisher Ulrich Schreck of West Germany, and fifth-place finishers Zsolt Érsek of Hungary and Mauro Numa (also the 1984 gold medalist) of Italy. Philippe Omnès of France had been a quarterfinalist in 1984 but had been defeated earlier in 1988; he medaled at all three of the world championships between the Seoul and Barcelona Games, including winning in 1990.

The Philippines and Singapore each made their debut in the men's foil; some former Soviet republics competed as the Unified Team. France and the United States each made their 19th appearance, tied for most of any nation; France had missed only the 1904 (with fencers not traveling to St. Louis) and the 1912 (boycotted due to a dispute over rules) foil competitions, while the United States had missed the inaugural 1896 competition and boycotted the 1980 Games altogether.

== Competition format ==
The 1992 tournament used a three-phase format roughly similar to prior years in consisting of a group phase, a double-elimination phase, and a single-elimination phase, but each phase was very different from previous formats.

The first phase was a single round (vs. 3 rounds in 1988) round-robin pool play format; each fencer in a pool faced each other fencer in that pool once. There were 9 pools with 6 or 7 fencers each. The fencers' ranks within the pool were ignored; the overall winning percentage (with touch differential and then touches against used as tie-breakers) were used to rank the fencers. The top 46 advanced to the second phase, while the other fencers were eliminated.

The second phase was a modified, truncated double-elimination tournament. 14 fencers received a bye to the second round (round of 32), while the 32 fencers ranked 15–46 played in the round of 64. Fencers losing in the round of 64 were eliminated, while the remaining rounds were double elimination via repechages. The repechages (but not the main brackets) used a complicated reseeding mechanism. Ultimately, the 4 fencers remaining undefeated after the round of 8 advanced to the quarterfinals along with 4 fencers who advanced through the repechages after one loss.

The final phase was a single elimination tournament with quarterfinals, semifinals, and a final and bronze medal match.

All bouts were to 5 touches. In the second and third phases, matches were best-of-three bouts.

== Schedule ==
All times are Central European Summer Time (UTC+2)

Date	Time	Round
Friday, 31 July 1992		Group round Elimination round Final round

== Results ==
=== Group round ===
Fencers were ranked by win percent, then touch differential, then touches against. This ranking, with adjustments to ensure that no two fencers of the same nation were in the same bracket (noted in parentheses), was used to seed the elimination round brackets.

Rank	Fencer	Nation	Pool	Rank	Wins	Losses	Win %	TF	TA	TF - TA	Qual.
1	Stefano Cerioni	Italy	7	1	6	0	1.000	30	8	22	Q
2	Ye Chong	China	1	1	6	0	1.000	30	11	19	Q
3	Dmitry Shevchenko	Unified Team	2	1	6	0	1.000	30	11	19	Q
4	Philippe Omnès	France	7	2	5	1	.833	26	11	15	Q
5	Andrea Borella	Italy	4	1	5	1	.833	27	13	14	Q
6	Zsolt Érsek	Hungary	3	1	5	1	.833	29	15	14	Q
7	Piotr Kiełpikowski	Poland	4	2	5	1	.833	25	15	10	Q
8	Marian Sypniewski	Poland	2	2	5	1	.833	28	19	9	Q
9	Serhiy Holubytskiy	Unified Team	5	1	4	1	.800	24	11	13	Q
10	Guillermo Betancourt	Cuba	9	1	4	1	.800	23	12	11	Q
11	Joachim Wendt	Austria	8	1	4	1	.800	24	13	11	Q
12 (14)	Mauro Numa	Italy	8	2	4	1	.800	23	14	9	Q
13 (12)	Ulrich Schreck	Germany	6	1	4	1	.800	22	17	5	Q
14 (13)	Jonathan Davis	Great Britain	3	2	4	2	.667	27	14	13	Q
15	Thorsten Weidner	Germany	1	2	4	2	.667	27	16	11	Q
16	Elvis Gregory	Cuba	4	3	4	2	.667	24	16	8	Q
17	Udo Wagner	Germany	3	3	4	2	.667	24	19	5	Q
18	Anatol Richter	Austria	3	4	4	2	.667	22	18	4	Q
19	Hiroki Ichigatani	Japan	7	3	4	2	.667	20	17	3	Q
20	Vyacheslav Grigoryev	Unified Team	1	3	4	2	.667	22	19	3	Q
21	Oscar García	Cuba	6	2	3	2	.600	21	15	6	Q
22	Patrick Groc	France	5	2	3	2	.600	20	15	5	Q
23	Patrice Lhôtellier	France	9	2	3	2	.600	19	15	4	Q
24	Yu Bong-Hyeong	South Korea	5	3	3	2	.600	17	14	3	Q
25	Kinya Abe	Japan	9	3	3	2	.600	17	17	0	Q
26	Mike Marx	United States	1	4	3	3	.500	23	17	6	Q
27 (28)	István Busa	Hungary	7	4	3	3	.500	24	21	3	Q
28 (27)	Ramiro Bravo	Spain	4	4	3	3	.500	21	20	1	Q
29	Kim Yeong-Ho	South Korea	1	5	3	3	.500	20	20	0	Q
30 (31)	Róbert Kiss	Hungary	2	3	3	3	.500	22	22	0	Q
31 (30)	Wang Haibin	China	4	5	3	3	.500	21	22	-1	Q
32	Nick Bravin	United States	3	5	3	3	.500	19	22	-3	Q
33	Lo Moon Tong	Hong Kong	9	4	2	3	.400	18	19	-1	Q
34 (36)	Michael Ludwig	Austria	6	3	2	3	.400	21	22	-1	Q
35 (34)	Ola Kajbjer	Sweden	5	4	2	3	.400	18	20	-2	Q
36 (37)	José Francisco Guerra	Spain	8	3	2	3	.400	17	20	-3	Q
37 (35)	Maged Abdallah	Egypt	8	3	2	3	.400	17	20	-3	Q
38	Wu Xing Yao	Hong Kong	6	4	2	3	.400	18	21	-3	Q
39	Yoshihide Nagano	Japan	6	4	2	3	.400	18	21	-3	Q
40	Bill Gosbee	Great Britain	5	5	2	3	.400	14	18	-4	Q
41	Benoît Giasson	Canada	9	5	2	3	.400	16	20	-4	Q
42	Donnie McKenzie	Great Britain	6	6	2	3	.400	17	21	-4	Q
43	Adam Krzesiński	Poland	8	5	2	3	.400	17	21	-4	Q
44	Zaddick Longenbach	United States	2	4	2	4	.333	21	25	-4	Q
45	Wang Lihong	China	2	4	2	4	.333	21	25	-4	Q
46	Andrés García	Spain	7	5	2	4	.333	16	21	-5	Q
47	Kim Seung-Pyo	South Korea	2	6	2	4	.333	20	28	-8	
48	Zahi El-Khoury	Lebanon	9	6	1	4	.200	11	21	-10	
49	Tang Kwong Hau	Hong Kong	8	6	1	4	.200	12	22	-10	
50	Alberto González	Argentina	5	6	1	4	.200	9	24	-15	
51	Hein van Garderen	South Africa	7	6	1	5	.167	14	25	-11	
52	José Guimarães	Portugal	2	7	1	6	.167	15	27	-12	
53	Walter Torres	Philippines	1	6	1	5	.167	10	26	-16	
54	Enzo da Ponte	Paraguay	3	6	1	5	.167	11	29	-18	
54	Dario Torrente	South Africa	4	6	1	5	.167	11	29	-18	
56	José Marcelo Álvarez	Paraguay	4	7	0	6	.000	16	30	-14	
57	Wong James	Singapore	3	7	0	6	.000	15	30	-15	
58	Tan Ronald	Singapore	1	7	0	6	.000	7	30	-23	
59	Michel Youssef	Lebanon	7	7	0	6	.000	3	30	-27	

=== Elimination rounds ===
==== Main brackets ====
===== Main bracket 1 =====
Bravin, Giasson, and Abe were eliminated after the round of 64. The losers in the round of 32 faced off, with Lo beating Wagner and Gosbee beating Abe to advance to the repechage. The losers of the round of 16, Cerioni and Holubytskiy, advanced directly to the first round of the repechage. Gregory, having lost in the round of 8, went to the third round of the repechage. Sypniewski won the bracket, advancing to the quarterfinals.

Round of 64
33	Lo Moon Tong (HKG)	5	6
32	Nick Bravin (USA)	3	4
41	Benoît Giasson (CAN)	1	1
24	Yu Bong-Hyeong (KOR)	5	5
25	Kinya Abe (JPN)	5	0
40	Bill Gosbee (GBR)	6	5

Round of 32
1	Stefano Cerioni (ITA)	5	5
33	Lo Moon Tong (HKG)	2	2
17	Udo Wagner (GER)	6	1	4
16	Elvis Gregory (CUB)	4	5	6
9	Serhiy Holubytskiy (EUN)	2	6	5
24	Yu Bong-Hyeong (KOR)	5	4	0
40	Bill Gosbee (GBR)	5	4	2
8	Marian Sypniewski (POL)	3	6	5

Round of 16
1	Stefano Cerioni (ITA)	3	3
16	Elvis Gregory (CUB)	5	5
9	Serhiy Holubytskiy (EUN)	3	5	3
8	Marian Sypniewski (POL)	5	2	5

Round of 8
16	Elvis Gregory (CUB)	5	3	1
8	Marian Sypniewski (POL)	3	5	5

====== Repechage qualifiers 1 ======
Repechage qualifier
33	Lo Moon Tong (HKG)	1	0
17	Udo Wagner (GER)	5	5

Repechage qualifier
24	Yu Bong-Hyeong (KOR)	5	5	5
40	Bill Gosbee (GBR)	1	6	6

===== Main bracket 2 =====
Guerra, Longenbach, Wang L., and Kim were eliminated after the round of 64. The losers in the round of 32 faced off, with O. García beating Busa and Davis beating Ludwig to advance to the repechage. The losers of the round of 16, Schreck and Grigoryev, advanced directly to the first round of the repechage. Omnès, having lost in the round of 8, went to the third round of the repechage. Borella won the bracket, advancing to the quarterfinals.

Round of 64
37	José Francisco Guerra (ESP)	0	5	5
28	István Busa (HUN)	5	2	6
21	Oscar García (CUB)	5	5
44	Zaddick Longenbach (USA)	3	2
45	Wang Lihong (CHN)	2	1
20	Vyacheslav Grigoryev (EUN)	5	5
29	Kim Yeong-Ho (KOR)	2	5	4
36	Michael Ludwig (AUT)	5	1	6

Round of 32
5	Andrea Borella (ITA)	5	5
28	István Busa (HUN)	3	2
21	Oscar García (CUB)	6	1	0
12	Ulrich Schreck (GER)	4	5	5
13	Jonathan Davis (GBR)	1	1
20	Vyacheslav Grigoryev (EUN)	5	5	0
36	Michael Ludwig (AUT)	1	3
4	Philippe Omnès (FRA)	5	5

Round of 16
5	Andrea Borella (ITA)	6	5
12	Ulrich Schreck (GER)	4	3
20	Vyacheslav Grigoryev (EUN)	2	5	2
4	Philippe Omnès (FRA)	5	2	5

Round of 8
5	Andrea Borella (ITA)	0	6	5
4	Philippe Omnès (FRA)	5	5	2

====== Repechage qualifiers 2 ======
Repechage qualifier
28	István Busa (HUN)	0	2
21	Oscar García (CUB)	5	5

Repechage qualifier
13	Jonathan Davis (GBR)	5	5
36	Michael Ludwig (AUT)	2	3

===== Main bracket 3 =====
Abdallah, Ichigatani, Krzesiński, and Wu were eliminated after the round of 64. The losers in the round of 32 faced off, with A. García beating Wang H. and Groc beating Bravo to advance to the repechage. The losers of the round of 16, Shevchenko and Érsek, advanced directly to the first round of the repechage. Numa, having lost in the round of 8, went to the third round of the repechage. Wendt won the bracket, advancing to the quarterfinals.

Round of 64
35	Maged Abdallah (EGY)	4	3
30	Wang Haibin (CHN)	6	5
19	Hiroki Ichigatani (JPN)	5	0	1
46	Andrés García (ESP)	3	5	5
43	Adam Krzesiński (POL)	3	1
22	Patrick Groc (FRA)	5	5
27	Ramiro Bravo (ESP)	6	3	5
38	Wu Xing Yao (HKG)	4	5	3

Round of 32
3	Dmitry Shevchenko (EUN)	5	5
30	Wang Haibin (CHN)	3	1
46	Andrés García (ESP)	2	0
14	Mauro Numa (ITA)	5	5
11	Joachim Wendt (AUT)	1	5	5
22	Patrick Groc (FRA)	5	1	3
27	Ramiro Bravo (ESP)	1	6	2
6	Zsolt Érsek (HUN)	5	5	5

Round of 16
3	Dmitry Shevchenko (EUN)	2	5	0
14	Mauro Numa (ITA)	5	1	5
11	Joachim Wendt (AUT)	5	2	5
6	Zsolt Érsek (HUN)	3	5	3

Round of 8
14	Mauro Numa (ITA)	6	1	2
11	Joachim Wendt (AUT)	5	5	5

====== Repechage qualifiers 3 ======
Repechage qualifier
30	Wang Haibin (CHN)	3	1
46	Andrés García (ESP)	5	5

Repechage qualifier
22	Patrick Groc (FRA)	5	4	6
27	Ramiro Bravo (ESP)	1	6	4

===== Main bracket 4 =====
Marx, Lhôtellier, and Kiss were eliminated after the round of 64. The losers in the round of 32 faced off, with Nagano beating McKenzie and Ye beating Weidner to advance to the repechage. The losers of the round of 16, Kiełpikowski and Richter, advanced directly to the first round of the repechage. Kajbjer, having lost in the round of 8, went to the third round of the repechage. Betancourt won the bracket, advancing to the quarterfinals.

Round of 64
39	Yoshihide Nagano (JPN)	5	5
26	Mike Marx (USA)	2	3
23	Patrice Lhôtellier (FRA)	2	3
42	Donnie McKenzie (GBR)	5	5
31	Róbert Kiss (HUN)	5	1
34	Ola Kajbjer (SWE)	6	5

Round of 32
7	Piotr Kiełpikowski (POL)	5	5
39	Yoshihide Nagano (JPN)	2	3
42	Donnie McKenzie (GBR)	1	0
10	Guillermo Betancourt (CUB)	5	5
15	Thorsten Weidner (GER)	5	5	4
18	Anatol Richter (AUT)	6	3	6
34	Ola Kajbjer (SWE)	2	6	5
2	Ye Chong (CHN)	5	4	3

Round of 16
7	Piotr Kiełpikowski (POL)	1	4
10	Guillermo Betancourt (CUB)	5	6
18	Anatol Richter (AUT)	5	3	1
34	Ola Kajbjer (SWE)	3	5	5

Round of 8
10	Guillermo Betancourt (CUB)	5	3	5
34	Ola Kajbjer (SWE)	3	5	3

====== Repechage qualifiers 4 ======
Repechage qualifier
39	Yoshihide Nagano (JPN)	5	5
42	Donnie McKenzie (GBR)	3	0

Repechage qualifier
15	Thorsten Weidner (GER)	2	3
2	Ye Chong (CHN)	5	5

==== Repechage rounds 1 and 2 ====
The fencers were reseeded: the eight fencers who had lost in the round of 16 were reseeded as 1–8 while the eight fencers who had lost in the round of 32 but won the repechage qualifiers were reseeded as 9–16. For example, original seed #2 Ye was reseeded as #9 because he was the top-seeded fencer who had advanced through the repechage qualifiers. Original seeds are shown in parentheses in the brackets.

R1 seed	O seed	Fencer	Nation
From round of 16
1	1	Stefano Cerioni	Italy
2	3	Dmitry Shevchenko	Unified Team
3	6	Zsolt Érsek	Hungary
4	7	Piotr Kiełpikowski	Poland
5	9	Serhiy Holubytskiy	Unified Team
6	12	Ulrich Schreck	Germany
7	18	Anatol Richter	Austria
8	20	Vyacheslav Grigoryev	Unified Team
From round of 32 and qualifiers
9	2	Ye Chong	China
10	13	Jonathan Davis	Great Britain
11	17	Udo Wagner	Germany
12	21	Oscar García	Cuba
13	22	Patrick Groc	France
14	39	Yoshihide Nagano	Japan
15	40	Bill Gosbee	Great Britain
16	46	Andrés García	Spain

===== Repechage rounds 1 and 2 bracket 1 =====
García faced the top two fencers from the group round, beating Cerioni before falling to Ye.

Repechage round 1					Repechage round 2
1 (1)	Stefano Cerioni (ITA)	1	6	4
16 (46)	Andrés García (ESP)	5	4	6	16 (46)	Andrés García (ESP)	2	2
9 (2)	Ye Chong (CHN)	5	3	5	9 (2)	Ye Chong (CHN)	5	5
8 (20)	Vyacheslav Grigoryev (EUN)	0	5	0

===== Repechage rounds 1 and 2 bracket 2 =====
Repechage round 1					Repechage round 2
5 (9)	Serhiy Holubytskiy (EUN)	6	5
12 (21)	Oscar García (CUB)	5	0		5 (9)	Serhiy Holubytskiy (EUN)	5	5
13 (22)	Patrick Groc (FRA)	1	5	3	4 (7)	Piotr Kiełpikowski (POL)	3	2
4 (7)	Piotr Kiełpikowski (POL)	5	2	5

===== Repechage rounds 1 and 2 bracket 3 =====
Repechage round 1					Repechage round 2
3 (6)	Zsolt Érsek (HUN)	5	5	5
14 (39)	Yoshihide Nagano (JPN)	6	3	3	3 (6)	Zsolt Érsek (HUN)	5	4
11 (17)	Udo Wagner (GER)	5	5	6	11 (17)	Udo Wagner (GER)	6	6
6 (12)	Ulrich Schreck (GER)	2	6	5

===== Repechage rounds 1 and 2 bracket 4 =====
Repechage round 1					Repechage round 2
7 (18)	Anatol Richter (AUT)	5	6
10 (13)	Jonathan Davis (GBR)	1	4		7 (18)	Anatol Richter (AUT)	6	6
15 (40)	Bill Gosbee (GBR)	0	6	2	2 (3)	Dmitry Shevchenko (EUN)	4	5
2 (3)	Dmitry Shevchenko (EUN)	5	5	5

==== Repechage round 3 ====
The fencers were reseeded again. Seeds 1–4 were given to round 8 losers, based on their original seeds. Seeds 5–8 were given to the winners of the second round of the repechage, based on their original seeds—except that Ye was moved from #5 to #6 to avoid a rematch with Kajbjer.

R3 seed	R1 seed	O seed	Fencer	Nation
From round of 8
1	–	4	Philippe Omnès	France
2	–	14	Mauro Numa	Italy
3	–	16	Elvis Gregory	Cuba
4	–	34	Ola Kajbjer	Sweden
From repechage round 2
5	5	9	Serhiy Holubytskiy	Unified Team
6	9	2	Ye Chong	China
7	11	17	Udo Wagner	Germany
8	7	18	Anatol Richter	Austria

===== Repechage round 3 bracket 1 =====
Repechage round 3
1 (4)	Philippe Omnès (FRA)	5	5
8 (18)	Anatol Richter (AUT)	1	3

===== Repechage round 3 bracket 2 =====
Repechage round 3
5 (9)	Serhiy Holubytskiy (EUN)	5	6
4 (34)	Ola Kajbjer (SWE)	1	5

===== Repechage round 3 bracket 3 =====
Repechage round 3
3 (16)	Elvis Gregory (CUB)	5	5
6 (2)	Ye Chong (CHN)	1	1

===== Repechage round 3 bracket 4 =====
Repechage round 3
7 (17)	Udo Wagner (GER)	6	2	5
2 (14)	Mauro Numa (ITA)	5	5	3

=== Final rounds ===
The fencers were reseeded a final time. Seeds 1–4 were given to the round of 8 winners, based on their original seeds. Seeds 5–8 were given to the winners of the third round of the repechage, based on their original seeds.

F seed	R3 seed	R1 seed	O seed	Fencer	Nation
From round of 8
1	–	–	5	Andrea Borella	Italy
2	–	–	8	Marian Sypniewski	Poland
3	–	–	10	Guillermo Betancourt	Cuba
4	–	–	11	Joachim Wendt	Austria
From repechage round 3
5	1	–	4	Philippe Omnès	France
6	5	5	9	Serhiy Holubytskiy	Unified Team
7	3	–	16	Elvis Gregory	Cuba
8	7	11	17	Udo Wagner	Germany

Quarterfinals
1 (5)	Andrea Borella (ITA)	6	4	0
8 (17)	Udo Wagner (GER)	4	6	5
5 (4)	Philippe Omnès (FRA)	5	5
4 (11)	Joachim Wendt (AUT)	3	3
3 (10)	Guillermo Betancourt (CUB)	2	0
6 (9)	Serhiy Holubytskiy (EUN)	5	5
7 (16)	Elvis Gregory (CUB)	5	6
2 (8)	Marian Sypniewski (POL)	0	5

Semifinals
8 (17)	Udo Wagner (GER)	3	6	3
5 (4)	Philippe Omnès (FRA)	5	5	5
6 (9)	Serhiy Holubytskiy (EUN)	3	5	5
7 (16)	Elvis Gregory (CUB)	5	2	1

Final
5 (4)	Philippe Omnès (FRA)	6	3	5
6 (9)	Serhiy Holubytskiy (EUN)	5	5	2
Bronze match
8 (17)	Udo Wagner (GER)	3	5	3
7 (16)	Elvis Gregory (CUB)	5	2	5

== Final classification ==
Fencer	Nation
Philippe Omnès	France
Serhiy Holubytskiy	Unified Team
Elvis Gregory	Cuba
Udo Wagner	Germany
Andrea Borella	Italy
Marian Sypniewski	Poland
Guillermo Betancourt	Cuba
Joachim Wendt	Austria
Ye Chong	China
Mauro Numa	Italy
Anatol Richter	Austria
Ola Kajbjer	Sweden
Dmitry Shevchenko	Unified Team
Zsolt Érsek	Hungary
Piotr Kiełpikowski	Poland
Andrés García	Spain
Stefano Cerioni	Italy
Ulrich Schreck	Germany
Jonathan Davis	Great Britain
Vyacheslav Grigoryev	Unified Team
Oscar García	Cuba
Patrick Groc	France
Yoshihide Nagano	Japan
Bill Gosbee	Great Britain
Thorsten Weidner	Germany
Yu Bong-Hyeong	South Korea
István Busa	Hungary
Ramiro Bravo	Spain
Wang Haibin	China
Lo Moon Tong	Hong Kong
Michael Ludwig	Austria
Donnie McKenzie	Great Britain
Hiroki Ichigatani	Japan
Patrice Lhôtellier	France
Kinya Abe	Japan
Mike Marx	United States
Kim Yeong-Ho	South Korea
Róbert Kiss	Hungary
Nick Bravin	United States
José Francisco Guerra	Spain
Maged Abdallah	Egypt
Wu Xing Yao	Hong Kong
Benoît Giasson	Canada
Adam Krzesiński	Poland
Zaddick Longenbach	United States
Wang Lihong	China
Kim Seung-Pyo	South Korea
Zahi El-Khoury	Lebanon
Tang Kwong Hau	Hong Kong
Alberto González	Argentina
Hein van Garderen	South Africa
José Guimarães	Portugal
Walter Torres	Philippines
Enzo da Ponte	Paraguay
Dario Torrente	South Africa
José Marcelo Álvarez	Paraguay
Wong James	Singapore
Tan Ronald	Singapore
Michel Youssef	Lebanon
