= Cuba at the 1992 Summer Olympics =

- IOC code: CUB
- NOC: Cuban Olympic Committee

in Barcelona
- Competitors: 176 (126 men and 50 women) in 16 sports
- Flag bearer: Héctor Milián
- Medals Ranked 5th: Gold 14 Silver 6 Bronze 11 Total 31

Summer Olympics appearances (overview)
- 1900; 1904; 1908–1920; 1924; 1928; 1932–1936; 1948; 1952; 1956; 1960; 1964; 1968; 1972; 1976; 1980; 1984–1988; 1992; 1996; 2000; 2004; 2008; 2012; 2016; 2020; 2024

Cuba competed at the 1992 Summer Olympics in Barcelona, Spain. The nation returned to the Olympic Games after boycotting both the 1984 Games and the 1988 Games. 176 competitors, 126 men and 50 women, took part in 90 events in 16 sports.

== Medalists ==
Medal	Name	Sport	Event	Date
Gold	Héctor Milián	Wrestling	Men's Greco-Roman 100 kg	28 July
Gold	Odalis Revé	Judo	Women's 66 kg	29 July
Gold	Javier Sotomayor	Athletics	Men's high jump	2 August
Gold	Maritza Martén	Athletics	Women's discus throw	3 August
Gold	Cuba national baseball team: Omar Ajete; Rolando Arrojo; José Delgado; Giorge Díaz; José Antonio Estrada; Osvaldo Fernández; Lourdes Gourriel; Orlando Hernández; Alberto Hernández; Orestes Kindelán; Omar Linares; Germán Mesa; Victor Mesa; Antonio Pacheco; Juan Padilla; Juan Carlos Pérez; Luis Ulacia; Ermidelio Urrutia; Jorge Luis Valdés; Lázaro Vargas	Baseball	Men's tournament	5 August
Gold	Alejandro Puerto	Wrestling	Men's freestyle 57 kg	7 August
Gold	Cuba women's national volleyball team: Regla Bell; Mercedes Calderón; Magalys Carvajal; Marlenis Costa; Marlenis Costa; Idalmis Gato; Lilia Izquierdo; Norka Latamblet; Mireya Luis; Tania Ortiz; Regla Torres	Volleyball	Women's tournament	7 August
Gold	Rogelio Marcelo	Boxing	Light flyweight	8 August
Gold	Joel Casamayor	Boxing	Bantamweight	8 August
Gold	Ariel Hernández	Boxing	Middleweight	8 August
Gold	Félix Savón	Boxing	Heavyweight	8 August
Gold	Héctor Vinent	Boxing	Light welterweight	9 August
Gold	Juan Carlos Lemus	Boxing	Light middleweight	9 August
Gold	Roberto Balado	Boxing	Super heavyweight	9 August
Silver	Estela Rodríguez	Judo	Women's +72 kg	27 July
Silver	Pablo Lara	Weightlifting	Men's 75 kg	30 July
Silver	Guillermo Betancourt; Tulio Díaz; Hermenegildo García; Óscar García; Elvis Gregory	Fencing	Men's team foil	5 August
Silver	Juan Hernández Sierra	Boxing	Welterweight	8 August
Silver	Roberto Hernández; Héctor Herrera; Lázaro Martínez; Norberto Téllez	Athletics	Men's 4 × 400 metres relay	8 August
Silver	Raúl González	Boxing	Flyweight	9 August
Bronze	Wilber Sánchez	Wrestling	Men's Greco-Roman 48 kg	29 July
Bronze	Juan Luis Marén	Wrestling	Men's Greco-Roman 62 kg	30 July
Bronze	Elvis Gregory	Fencing	Men's foil	31 July
Bronze	Driulis González	Judo	Women's 56 kg	31 July
Bronze	Israel Hernández	Judo	Men's 65 kg	1 August
Bronze	Amarilis Savón	Judo	Women's 48 kg	2 August
Bronze	Ana Fidelia Quirot	Athletics	Women's 800 metres	3 August
Bronze	Roberto Moya	Athletics	Men's discus throw	5 August
Bronze	Lázaro Reinoso	Wrestling	Men's freestyle 62 kg	7 August
Bronze	Jorge Aguilera; Joel Isasi; Joel Lamela; Andrés Simón	Athletics	Men's 4 × 100 metres relay	8 August
Bronze	Ioamnet Quintero	Athletics	Women's high jump	8 August

== Competitors ==
The following is the list of number of competitors in the Games.

Sport	Men	Women	Total
Athletics	17	17	34
Baseball	20	–	20
Basketball	0	12	12
Boxing	12	–	12
Canoeing	5	0	5
Cycling	4	0	4
Fencing	5	0	5
Judo	5	7	12
Rowing	3	0	3
Shooting	3	2	5
Swimming	2	0	2
Table tennis	2	2	4
Volleyball	12	10	22
Water polo	13	–	13
Weightlifting	8	–	8
Wrestling	15	–	15
Total	126	50	176

== Athletics ==
Men's 4 × 400 m Relay

- Lázaro Martínez, Héctor Herrera, Norberto Téllez, and Roberto Hernández
  - Heat — 2:59.13
  - Final — 2:59.51 (→ Silver Medal)

Men's Marathon

- Alberto Cuba — did not finish (→ no ranking)

Men's Long Jump

- Iván Pedroso
  - Qualification — 8.07 m
  - Final — 8.11 m (→ 4th place)
- Jaime Jefferson
  - Qualification — 8.09 m
  - Final — 8.08 m (→ 5th place)

Men's Triple Jump

- Yoelvis Quesada
  - Qualification — 17.21 m
  - Final — 17.18 m (→ 6th place)

Men's Discus Throw

- Roberto Moya
  - Qualification — 62.06 m
  - Final — 64.12 m (→ Bronze Medal)
- Juan Martínez
  - Qualification — 60.34 m
  - Final — 62.64 m (→ 6th place)

Women's 800 metres

- Ana Fidelia Quirot
  - Heat — 1:59.06
  - Semifinal — 2:00.86
  - Final — 1:56.80 (→ Bronze Medal)

Women's Discus Throw

- Maritza Marten
  - Qualification — 65.02m
  - Final — 70.06m (→ Gold Medal)
- Hilda Ramos
  - Qualification — 62.82m
  - Final — 63.80m (→ 6th place)
- Bárbara Hechavarría
  - Qualification — 60.22m (→ did not advance)

Women's High Jump

- Ioamnet Quintero
  - Qualification — 1.92 m
  - Final — 1.97 m (→ Bronze Medal)
- Silvia Costa
  - Qualification — 1.92 m
  - Final — 1.94 m (→ 5th place)

== Baseball ==
Men's Team Competition:

- Cuba – Gold Medal (9–0)

Team Roster

- Omar Ajete
- Rolando Arrojo
- José Raúl Delgado
- Giorge Diaz
- José Estrada González
- Osvaldo Fernández
- Lourdes Gourriel
- Alberto Hernández
- Orlando Hernández
- Orestes Kindelán
- Omar Linares
- Germán Mesa
- Víctor Mesa
- Antonio Pacheco
- Juan Padilla
- Juan Pérez
- Luis Ulacia
- Ermidelio Urrutia
- Jorge Valdés
- Lázaro Vargas

== Basketball ==
=== Women's team competition ===
- Preliminary round (group A)
  - Defeated Unified Team (91–89)
  - Defeated Brazil (95–88)
  - Defeated Italy (60–53)
- Semifinals
  - Lost to PR China (70–109)
- Bronze Medal Match
  - Lost to United States (74–88) → 4th place
- Team Roster
  - Andrea Borrell
  - Ana Hernández
  - Olga Vigil
  - Grisel Herrera
  - Biosotis Lagnó
  - Yudith Águila
  - María León
  - Yamilé Martínez
  - Dalia Henry
  - Liset Castillo
  - Regla Hernández
  - Milayda Enríquez
- Head coach: Manuel Pérez

== Boxing ==
Men's Light Flyweight (– 48 kg)

- Rogelio Marcelo → Gold Medal
  - First round – Defeated Mfamasibili Mnisi (SWZ), RSC-3
  - Second round – Defeated Erdenentsogt Tsogtjargal (MGL), 14:2
  - Quarterfinals – Defeated Rafael Lozano (ESP), 11:3
  - Semifinals – Defeated Roel Velasco (PHI), RSCH-1
  - Final – Defeated Daniel Petrov (BUL), 20:10

Men's Flyweight (– 51 kg)

- Raúl González → Silver Medal
  - First round – Defeated Leszek Olszewski (POL), 15:7
  - Second round – Defeated Moses Malagu (NGR), RSC-2
  - Quarterfinals – Defeated David Serradas (VEN), 14:7
  - Semifinals – Defeated Timothy Austin (USA) RSC-1
  - Final – Lost to Choi Chol-Su (PRK), 2:12

Men's Bantamweight (– 54 kg)

- Joel Casamayor → Gold Medal
  - First round – Defeated Devarajan Venkatesan (IND), 13:7
  - Second round – Defeated Riadh Klai (TUN), 16:11
  - Quarterfinals – Defeated Roberto Jalnaiz (PHI), KO-1
  - Semifinals – Defeated Mohamed Achik (MAR), AB-1
  - Final – Defeated Wayne McCullough (IRL), 16:8

Men's Featherweight (– 57 kg)

- Eddy Suarez
  - First round – Defeated Lee Chil-Gun (PRK), 20:5
  - Second round – Defeated Mohamed Soltani (TUN), RSC-2 (02:53)
  - Quarterfinals – Lost to Faustino Reyes (ESP), 7:17

Men's Lightweight (– 60 kg)

- Julio González Valladares
  - First round – Lost to Tontcho Tontchev (BUL), 12:14

Men's Light Welterweight (– 63.5 kg)

- Héctor Vinent → Gold Medal
  - First round – Defeated Edwin Cassiani (COL), 27:4
  - Second round – Defeated Andreas Zülow (GER), 14:2
  - Quarterfinals – Defeated Oleg Nikolaev (URS), 26:3
  - Semifinals – Defeated Jyri Kjall (FIN), 13:3
  - Final – Defeated Mark Leduc (CAN), 11:1

Men's Welterweight (– 67 kg)

- Juan Hernández Sierra → Silver Medal
  - First round – Defeated Said Bennajem (FRA), 6:0
  - Second round – Defeated Jun Jin-Chul (KOR), RSC-2
  - Quarterfinals – Defeated Sören Antman (SWE), RSC-2
  - Semifinals – Defeated Aníbal Acevedo (PUR), 11:2
  - Final – Lost to Michael Carruth (IRL), 10:13

Men's Light Middleweight (– 71 kg)

- Juan Carlos Lemus → Gold Medal
  - First round – Defeated Arkadiy Topayev (EUN), 11:0
  - Second round – Defeated Markus Beyer (GER), RSC-1
  - Quarterfinals – Defeated Igors Saplavskis (LAT), 12:2
  - Semifinals – Defeated György Mizsei (HUN), 10:2
  - Final – Defeated Orhan Delibaş (NED), 6:1

Men's Middleweight (– 75 kg)

- Ariel Hernández → Gold Medal
  - First round – Defeated Joseph Lareya (GHA), 6:0
  - Second round – Defeated Gilberto Brown (ISV), 13:2
  - Quarterfinals – Defeated Sven Ottke (GER), 14:6
  - Semifinals – Defeated Lee Seung-Bae (KOR), 14:1
  - Final – Defeated Chris Byrd (USA), 12:7

Men's Light Heavyweight (– 81 kg)

- Angel Espinosa
  - First round – Defeated Mehmet Gürgen (TUR), RSC-3
  - Second round – Defeated Roberto Castelli (ITA), RSC-1
  - Quarterfinals – Lost to Wojciech Bartnik (POL), 3:9

Men's Heavyweight (– 91 kg)

- Félix Savón → Gold Medal
  - First round – Defeated Krysztof Rojek (POL), RSC-2
  - Second round – Defeated Bert Teuchiert (GER), 11:2
  - Quarterfinals – Defeated Danell Nicholson (USA), 13:11
  - Semifinals – Defeated Arnold Vanderlyde (NED), 23:3
  - Final – Defeated David Izonritei (NGR), 14:1

Men's Super Heavyweight (+ 91 kg)

- Roberto Balado → Gold Medal
  - First round – Bye
  - Second round – Defeated Tom Glesby (CAN), 16:2
  - Quarterfinals – Defeated Larry Donald (USA), 10:4
  - Semifinals – Defeated Brian Nielsen (DEN), 15:1
  - Final – Defeated Richard Igbineghu (NGR), 13:2

== Cycling ==
Four male cyclists represented Cuba in 1992.

Men's team pursuit

- Conrado Cabrera
- Eugenio Castro
- Noël de la Cruz
- Raúl Domínguez

Men's points race

- Conrado Cabrera

== Fencing ==
Five male fencers represented Cuba in 1992.

Men's foil

- Elvis Gregory
- Guillermo Betancourt
- Oscar García
- Alain Julian

Men's team foil

- Elvis Gregory, Guillermo Betancourt, Oscar García, Tulio Díaz, Hermenegildo García

== Judo ==
Men's Half-Lightweight

- Israel Hernández

Men's Lightweight

- Ignacio Sayu

Men's Middleweight

- Andrés Franco

Men's Half-Heavyweight

- Belarmino Salgado

Men's Heavyweight

- Frank Moreno

Women's Extra-Lightweight

- Amarilis Savón

Women's Half-Lightweight

- Legna Verdecia

Women's Lightweight

- Driulys González

Women's Half-Middleweight

- Ileana Beltrán

Women's Middleweight

- Odalis Revé

Women's Half-Heavyweight

- Niurka Moreno

Women's Heavyweight

- Estela Rodríguez

== Swimming ==
Men's 100m Backstroke

- Rodolfo Falcón
  - Heat – 55.99
  - Final – 55.76 (→ 7th place)

Men's 200m Backstroke

- Rodolfo Falcón
  - Heat – 2:00.52
  - B-Final – 2:00.22 (→ 9th place)

Men's 100m Breaststroke

- Mario González
  - Heat – 1:03.53 (→ did not advance, 22nd place)

Men's 200m Breaststroke

- Mario González
  - Heat – 2:16.45 (→ did not advance, 18th place)

== Volleyball ==
=== Men's team competition ===
- Preliminary round (group B)
  - Defeated Netherlands (3–1)
  - Defeated Algeria (3–0)
  - Defeated Unified Team (3–1)
  - Lost to Brazil (1–3)
  - Defeated South Korea (3–0)
- Quarterfinals
  - Defeated Spain (3–0)
- Semifinals
  - Lost to Netherlands (0–3)
- Bronze Medal Match
  - Lost to United States (1–3) → Fourth place
- Team Roster
  - Félix Millán
  - Freddy Brooks
  - Idalberto Valdés
  - Ihosvany Hernández
  - Joël Despaigne
  - Lázaro Beltrán
  - Lázaro Marín
  - Nicolas Vives
  - Osvaldo Hernández
  - Raúl Diago
  - Rodolfo Sánchez
  - Abel Sarmientos

=== Women's team competition ===
- Preliminary round (group B)
  - Defeated PR China (3–1)
  - Defeated Brazil (3–1)
  - Defeated Netherlands (3–0)
- Semifinals
  - Defeated United States (3–2)
- Final
  - Defeated Unified Team (3–1) → Gold Medal
- Team Roster
  - Regla Bell
  - Mercedes Calderón
  - Magalys Carvajal
  - Marlenys Costa
  - Ana Ibis Fernandez
  - Idalmis Gato
  - Lilia Izquierdo
  - Norka Latamblet
  - Mireya Luis (c)
  - Raisa O'Farrill
  - Tania Ortiz
  - Regla Torres
- Head coach: Eugenio Lafita

== Water polo ==
=== Men's team competition ===
- Preliminary round (group B)
  - Defeated Greece (10–9)
  - Lost to Hungary (11–12)
  - Lost to Italy (8–11)
  - Lost to the Netherlands (9–11)
  - Lost to Spain (10–12)
- Classification Matches
  - Lost to Australia (5–7)
  - Lost to Germany (6–10) → 8th place
- Team Roster
  - Bárbaro Diaz
  - Juan Barreras
  - Norge Blay
  - Pablo Cuesta
  - Jorge Del Valle
  - Marcelo Derauville
  - Lazaro Fernández
  - Ernesto García
  - Juan Hernández Olivera
  - Juan Hernández Silveira
  - Guillermo Martínez
  - Iván Pérez
  - José Ramos

== Weightlifting ==
Men's Middleweight

- Pablo Lara
- Raúl Mora

Men's Light-Heavyweight

- Lino Elias
- José Ernesto Heredia

Men's Middle-Heavyweight

- Emilio Lara

Men's Heavyweight II

- Flavio Villavicencio
- Maurys Charón

Men's Super-Heavyweight

- Ernesto Aguero

== See also ==
- Cuba at the 1991 Pan American Games
