= Fencing at the 1992 Summer Olympics – Men's team foil =

Men's team foil at the Games of the XXV Olympiad
- Venue: Palace of Metallurgy
- Dates: 4 – 5 August 1992
- Competitors: 59 from 12 nations

Medalists
1st place, gold medalist(s)		Udo Wagner; Ulrich Schreck; Thorsten Weidner; Alexander Koch; Ingo Weißenborn	Germany
2nd place, silver medalist(s)		Elvis Gregory; Guillermo Betancourt; Oscar García; Tulio Díaz; Hermenegildo García	Cuba
3rd place, bronze medalist(s)		Marian Sypniewski; Piotr Kiełpikowski; Adam Krzesiński; Cezary Siess; Ryszard Sobczak	Poland

The men's team foil was one of eight fencing events on the fencing at the 1992 Summer Olympics programme. It was the eighteenth appearance of the event. The competition was held from 5 to 6 August 1992. 59 fencers from 12 nations competed.

== Results ==
=== Round One ===
==== Pool A ====
Team	Pld	W	L
Cuba	3	2	0
Hungary	3	1	1
Great Britain	3	0	2

==== Pool B ====
Team	Pld	W	L
Italy	3	2	0
Poland	3	1	1
China	3	0	2

==== Pool C ====
Team	Pld	W	L
Unified Team	3	2	0
France	3	1	1
Spain	3	0	2

==== Pool D ====
Team	Pld	W	L
Germany	3	2	0
South Korea	3	1	1
Austria	3	0	2

=== Final Round ===
Quarterfinals
Cuba	8
South Korea	8
Poland	8
Unified Team	8
Germany	9
France	5
Hungary	9
Italy	5

Semifinals
Cuba	9
Poland	7
Germany	8
Hungary	5

Final
Cuba	8
Germany	8
Third place
Poland	9
Hungary	4

== Rosters ==
Austria

- Benny Wendt
- Anatol Richter
- Michael Ludwig
- Robert Blaschka
- Merten Mauritz

China

- Ye Chong
- Wang Haibin
- Wang Lihong
- Chen Biao
- Lao Shaopei

Cuba

- Elvis Gregory
- Guillermo Betancourt
- Oscar García
- Tulio Díaz
- Hermenegildo García

France

- Patrick Groc
- Youssef Hocine
- Olivier Lambert
- Patrice Lhôtellier
- Philippe Omnès

Germany

- Udo Wagner
- Ulrich Schreck
- Thorsten Weidner
- Alexander Koch
- Ingo Weißenborn

Great Britain

- Jonathan Davis
- Bill Gosbee
- Donnie McKenzie
- Tony Bartlett

Hungary

- István Busa
- Zsolt Érsek
- Róbert Gátai
- Róbert Kiss
- Zsolt Németh

Italy

- Marco Arpino
- Andrea Borella
- Stefano Cerioni
- Mauro Numa
- Alessandro Puccini

Poland

- Marian Sypniewski
- Piotr Kiełpikowski
- Adam Krzesiński
- Cezary Siess
- Ryszard Sobczak

South Korea

- Kim Yeong-Ho
- Kim Seung-Pyo
- Lee Ho-seong
- Lee Seung-Yong
- Yu Bong-Hyeong

Spain

- Andrés García
- Ramiro Bravo
- José Francisco Guerra
- Andrés Crespo
- Jesús Esperanza

Unified Team

- Dmitry Shevchenko
- Serhiy Holubytskiy
- Vyacheslav Grigoryev
- Anvar Ibragimov
- Ilgar Mamedov
