= Fencing at the 1992 Summer Olympics =

Fencing at the Games of the XXV Olympiad
- Venue: Palau de la Metal·lúrgia
- Dates: 30 July – 7 August
- Competitors: 305 from 42 nations

At the 1992 Summer Olympics, eight fencing events were contested. Men competed in both individual and team events for each of the three weapon types (épée, foil and sabre), but women competed only in foil events.

== Medal summary ==
=== Men's events ===
Games	Gold	Silver	Bronze
Individual épée	Éric Srecki; France	Pavel Kolobkov; Unified Team (Russia)	Jean-Michel Henry; France
team épée	Germany; Elmar Borrmann; Robert Felisiak; Arnd Schmitt; Uwe Proske; Wladimir Reznitschenko	Hungary; Iván Kovács; Krisztián Kulcsár; Ferenc Hegedűs; Ernõ Kolczonay; Gábor Totola	Unified Team; Pavel Kolobkov; Andrey Shuvalov; Sergei Kravchouk; Sergei Kostarev; Valery Zakharevich
individual foil	Philippe Omnes; France	Sergei Golubitsky; Unified Team (Ukraine)	Elvis Gregory; Cuba
team foil	Germany; Udo Wagner; Ulrich Schreck; Thorsten Weidner; Alexander Koch; Ingo Weissenborn	Cuba; Elvis Gregory; Guillermo Betancourt Scull; Oscar García Perez; Tulio Diaz Babier; Hermenegildo Garcia Marturell	Poland; Marian Sypniewski; Piotr Kiełpikowski; Adam Krzesiński; Cezary Siess; Ryszard Sobczak
Individual sabre	Bence Szabó; Hungary	Marco Marin; Italy	Jean-François Lamour; France
team sabre	Unified Team; Grigory Kiriyenko; Aleksandr Shirshov; Heorhiy Pohosov; Vadim Gutzeit; Stanislav Pozdnyakov	Hungary; Bence Szabó; Csaba Köves; György Nébald; Péter Abay; Imre Bujdosó	France; Jean-François Lamour; Jean-Phillippe Daurelle; Franck Ducheix; Hervé Grainger-Veyron; Pierre Guichot

=== Women's events ===
Games	Gold	Silver	Bronze
Individual foil	Giovanna Trillini; Italy	Wang Huifeng; China	Tatyana Sadovskaya; Unified Team (Russia)
team foil	Italy; Diana Bianchedi; Francesca Bortolozzi; Giovanna Trillini; Dorina Vaccaroni; Margherita Zalaffi	Germany; Sabine Bau; Zita Funkenhauser; Annette Dobmeier; Anja Fichtel-Mauritz; Monika Weber-Koszto	Romania; Reka Szabo-Lazar; Claudia Grigorescu; Elisabeta Tufan; Laura Badea; Roxana Dumitrescu

== Medal table ==
Germany and Italy finished joint-top of the fencing medal table at the 1992 Summer Olympics.

Rank	Nation	Gold	Silver	Bronze	Total
1	Germany	2	1	0	3
1	Italy	2	1	0	3
3	France	2	0	3	5
4	Unified Team	1	2	2	5
5	Hungary	1	2	0	3
6	Cuba	0	1	1	2
7	China	0	1	0	1
8	Poland	0	0	1	1
8	Romania	0	0	1	1
Totals (9 entries)		8	8	8	24

== Participating nations ==
A total of 305 fencers (234 men and 71 women) from 42 nations competed at the Barcelona Games:

- Argentina (5)
- Australia (2)
- Austria (5)
- Brazil (4)
- Canada (16)
- China (15)
- Colombia (2)
- Costa Rica (1)
- Cuba (5)
- Czechoslovakia (5)
- Estonia (2)
- Egypt (1)
- France (20)
- Germany (20)
- Great Britain (15)
- Greece (1)
- Honduras (1)
- Hong Kong (3)
- Hungary (20)
- Indonesia (2)
- Independent Olympic Participants (1)
- Ireland (1)
- Israel (1)
- Italy (20)
- Japan (6)
- Kuwait (1)
- Lebanon (2)
- New Zealand (1)
- Paraguay (2)
- Philippines (1)
- Poland (20)
- Portugal (4)
- Romania (15)
- Saudi Arabia (1)
- Singapore (2)
- South Africa (5)
- South Korea (15)
- Spain (17)
- Sweden (6)
- Switzerland (3)
- Unified Team (20)
- United States (16)
