= Fencing at the 1996 Summer Olympics – Men's team foil =

Men's team foil at the Games of the XXVI Olympiad
- Venue: Georgia World Congress Center
- Dates: 25 July 1996
- Competitors: 34 from 11 nations

Medalists
1st place, gold medalist(s)		Dmitry Shevchenko; Ilgar Mammadov; Vladislav Pavlovich	Russia
2nd place, silver medalist(s)		Adam Krzesiński; Piotr Kiełpikowski; Ryszard Sobczak; Jarosław Rodzewicz	Poland
3rd place, bronze medalist(s)		Elvis Gregory; Oscar García; Rolando Tucker	Cuba

The men's team foil was one of ten fencing events on the fencing at the 1996 Summer Olympics programme. It was the nineteenth appearance of the event. The competition was held on 25 July 1996. 34 fencers from 11 nations competed.

== Brackets ==
1/16
08:30
Cuba
bye
08:30
South Korea	45
China	42
08:30
Russia
bye
08:30
Hungary
bye
08:30
Germany
bye
08:30
Poland	45
Venezuela	27
08:30
Italy
bye
08:30
Austria	45
United States	32

Quarterfinals
10:00
Cuba	45
South Korea	34
10:00
Russia	45
Hungary	43
10:00
Germany	44
Poland	45
10:00
Italy	36
Austria	45

Semifinals
11:25
Cuba	44
Russia	45
11:25
Poland	45
Austria	38

Gold medal final
19:50
Russia	45
Poland	40
Bronze medal final
18:30
Cuba	45
Austria	28

== Rosters ==
Austria - 4th place

- Benny Wendt
- Marco Falchetto
- Michael Ludwig

China - 9th place

- Ye Chong
- Dong Zhaozhi
- Wang Haibin

Cuba

- Elvis Gregory
- Oscar García
- Rolando Tucker

Germany - 6th place

- Alexander Koch
- Uwe Römer
- Wolfgang Wienand

Hungary - 5th place

- Márk Marsi
- Róbert Kiss
- Zsolt Érsek

Italy - 8th place

- Alessandro Puccini
- Marco Arpino
- Stefano Cerioni

Poland

- Adam Krzesiński
- Piotr Kiełpikowski
- Ryszard Sobczak
- Jarosław Rodzewicz

Russia

- Dmitry Shevchenko
- Ilgar Mammadov
- Vladislav Pavlovich

South Korea - 7th place

- Jeong Su-Gi
- Kim Yong-Guk
- Kim Yeong-Ho

United States - 10th place

- Cliff Bayer
- Nick Bravin
- Peter Devine

Venezuela - 11th place

- Alfredo Pérez
- Carlos Rodríguez
- Rafael Suárez
