= Fencing at the 1996 Summer Olympics =

Fencing at the Games of the XXV Olympiad

At the 1996 Summer Olympics, ten fencing events were contested. Women's épée events made a debut at these Games.

== Medal summary ==
=== Men's events ===
Games	Gold	Silver	Bronze
Individual épée	Aleksandr Beketov; Russia	Iván Trevejo; Cuba	Géza Imre; Hungary
team épée	Italy; Sandro Cuomo; Angelo Mazzoni; Maurizio Randazzo	Russia; Aleksandr Beketov; Pavel Kolobkov; Valery Zakharevich	France; Jean-Michel Henry; Robert Leroux; Éric Srecki
Individual foil	Alessandro Puccini; Italy	Lionel Plumenail; France	Franck Boidin; France
team foil	Russia; Dmitriy Shevchenko; Ilgar Mamedov; Vladislav Pavlovich	Poland; Piotr Kiełpikowski; Adam Krzesiński; Ryszard Sobczak; Jarosław Rodzewicz	Cuba; Elvis Gregory; Rolando Leon; Oscar García Perez
Individual sabre	Stanislav Pozdnyakov; Russia	Sergey Sharikov; Russia	Damien Touya; France
team sabre	Russia; Stanislav Pozdnyakov; Grigoriy Kirienko; Sergey Sharikov	Hungary; Csaba Köves; József Navarrete; Bence Szabó	Italy; Raffaello Caserta; Luigi Tarantino; Toni Terenzi

=== Women's events ===
Games	Gold	Silver	Bronze
Individual épée	Laura Flessel; France	Valérie Barlois; France	Gyöngyi Szalay; Hungary
team épée	France; Laura Flessel; Sophie Moressée-Pichot; Valérie Barlois	Italy; Laura Chiesa; Elisa Uga; Margherita Zalaffi	Russia; Maria Mazina; Yuliya Garayeva; Karina Aznavourian
Individual foil	Laura Badea; Romania	Valentina Vezzali; Italy	Giovanna Trillini; Italy
team foil	Italy; Francesca Bortolozzi-Borella; Giovanna Trillini; Valentina Vezzali	Romania; Laura Badea; Reka Szabo; Roxana Scarlat	Germany; Anja Fichtel Mauritz; Sabine Bau; Monika Weber-Koszto

== Medal table ==
Russia finished atop of the fencing medal table at the 1996 Summer Olympics.

Rank	Nation	Gold	Silver	Bronze	Total
1	Russia	4	2	1	7
2	Italy	3	2	2	7
3	France	2	2	3	7
4	Romania	1	1	0	2
5	Hungary	0	1	2	3
6	Cuba	0	1	1	2
7	Poland	0	1	0	1
8	Germany	0	0	1	1
Totals (8 entries)		10	10	10	30

== Participating nations ==
A total of 224 fencers (136 men and 88 women) from 46 nations competed at the Atlanta Games:

- Algeria (2)
- Argentina (4)
- Australia (1)
- Austria (3)
- Azerbaijan (1)
- Belarus (1)
- Bolivia (1)
- Bulgaria (3)
- Canada (7)
- China (9)
- Chile (1)
- Colombia (2)
- Cuba (7)
- Czech Republic (1)
- Denmark (1)
- Estonia (6)
- Finland (1)
- France (15)
- Georgia (1)
- Germany (15)
- Great Britain (2)
- Greece (1)
- Guatemala (1)
- Hungary (15)
- Israel (3)
- Italy (16)
- Japan (4)
- Kazakhstan (1)
- Kuwait (1)
- Luxembourg (1)
- Paraguay (1)
- Poland (11)
- Portugal (1)
- Puerto Rico (1)
- Romania (9)
- Russia (15)
- FR Yugoslavia (1)
- South Korea (13)
- Spain (11)
- Sweden (2)
- Switzerland (5)
- Tunisia (1)
- Ukraine (6)
- United States (15)
- Uzbekistan (1)
- Venezuela (4)
