= Juan Hernández =

Juan Hernández may refer to:

== Arts and Entertainment ==
- Juano Hernandez (1896–1970), Puerto Rican stage and film actor
- Juan Carlos Hernández Nava, Mexican director

== Politicians ==
- Juan Hernández López (1859–?), Puerto Rican politician and senator
- Juan Blas Hernández (1879–1933), Cuban revolutionary
- Juan Hernández Saravia (1880–1962), Republican officer in the Spanish Civil War
- Juan Hernandez (political advisor) (born 1955), American political adviser
- Juan Alonso Hernández Hernández (born 1960), Mexican politician
- Juan Orlando Hernández (born 1968), President of Honduras from January 2014 to January 2022
- Juan Eugenio Hernández Mayoral (born 1969), Puerto Rican senator

== Sportspeople ==
=== Association football ===
- Juan Hernández (footballer, born 1965), Mexican football defender
- Juan Francisco Hernández (born 1978), Peruvian football centre-back
- Juan Hernández (footballer, born 1994), Spanish football forward
- Juan "Cucho" Hernández (born 1999), Colombian football striker
- Juan Hernández (footballer, born 2007), Spanish football midfielder

=== Boxing ===
- Juan Bautista Hernández Pérez (born 1962), Cuban boxer
- Juan Hernández Sierra (born 1969), Cuban boxer
- Juan Hernández (Mexican boxer), (born 1987), Mexican boxer

=== Other sports ===
- Juan de Hernández (born 1947), Guatemalan wrestler
- Juan Hernández Olivera (born 1966), Cuban water polo player
- Juan Hernández Silveira (born 1968), Cuban water polo player
- Juan Hernández (tennis) (born 1980), Mexican tennis player
- Juan Martín Hernández (born 1982), Argentine rugby player

== Other ==
- Juan Hernández Giménez (1914–2006), Spanish aviator and informant for the French resistance
