= AZS-AWFiS Gdańsk =

Polish sport club

- Full name: Klub Sportowy AZS-AWFiS w Gdańsku
- School: Akademia Wychowania Fizycznego i Sportu im. Jędrzeja Śniadeckiego w Gdańsku
- Founded: 1971
- Region: Pomerania
- Based in: Gdańsk
- Location: Oliwa
- Affiliation: AZS
- Website: Official website

AZS-AWFiS Gdańsk is a Polish multisports club based in Gdańsk, Poland. It is the university sports club for the Jędrzej Śniadecki Academy of Physical Education and Sport (AWFiS), and has seen many of the club's teams becoming professional and, at times, competitive within their respective sports.

The club currently has sections in 9 sports, these sports being; athletics, bobsleigh, fencing, gymnastics, judo, rowing, sailing, swimming, table tennis, and a section for universal sports, of the focused sports many athletes from these sections have represented Poland at the Olympics.

While these sections are no longer active within the sports club, in the early 2000s the club had competitive teams in rugby and handball.

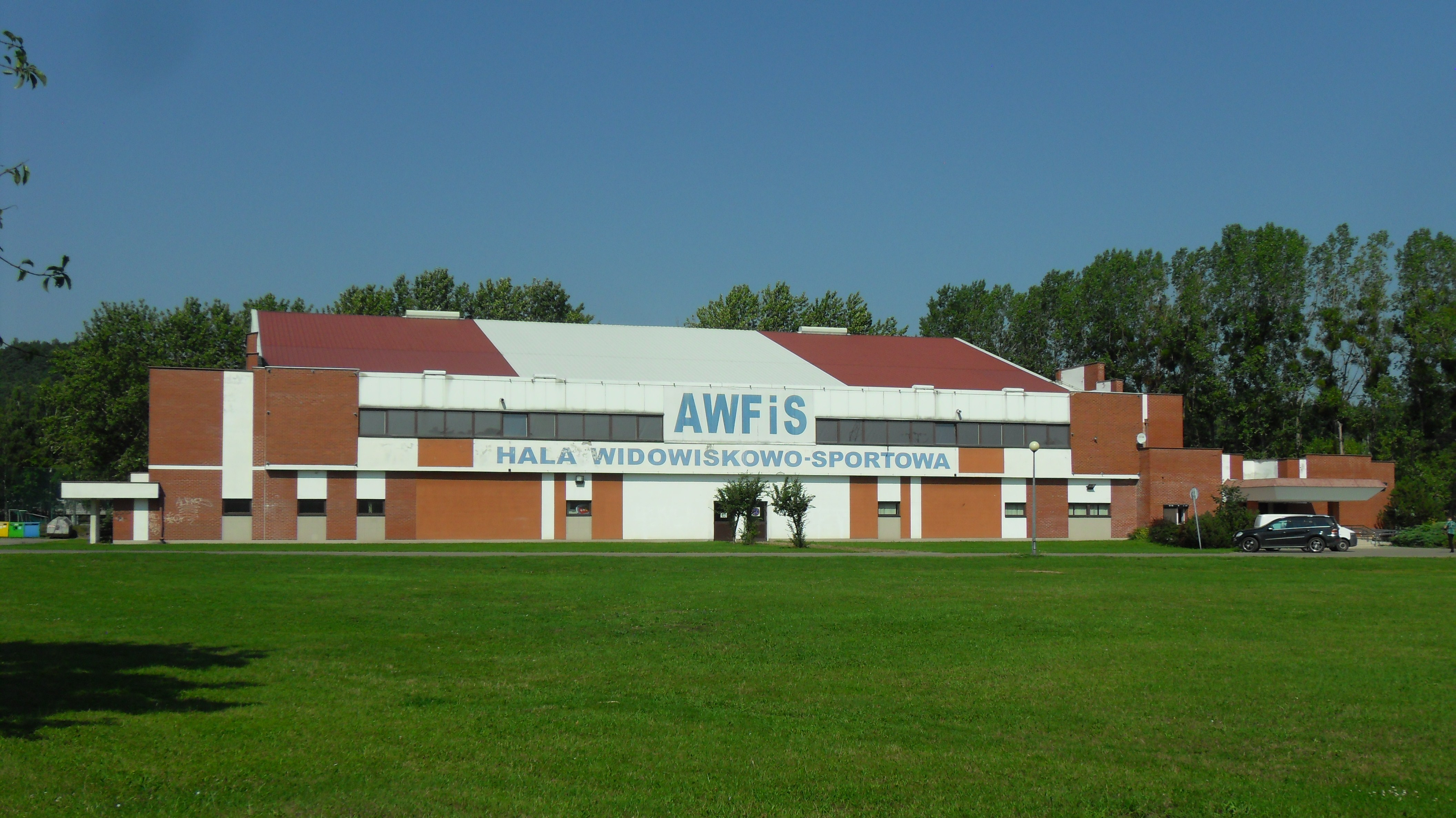
AZS-AWFiS Gdańsk‘s sports hall in Oliwa, Gdańsk

== Sections ==
=== Men's handball ===
Men's handball: AZS-AWFiS Gdańsk - dissolved 2010

The men's handball team, while not as successful as the women's section still had some minor success and played in the Superliga for six seasons between 2003–2010. The team's highest finish was a 6th placed finish in 2008–09.

=== Women's handball ===
Women's handball: AZS-AWFiS Gdańsk - dissolved 2017

In the early 2000s the women's handball team was one of the best in Poland, finishing consistently as one of the best three clubs in the country. The club won one Polish championship, one Polish Cup, and made the semi-finals of the European Cup.

Honours;

Superliga

- Winners: 2003–04
- Runners-up: 2004–05, 2007–08
- Third place: 2001–02, 2002–03, 2005–06

Polish Cup

- Winners: 2005

European Cup

- Semi-final: 2002–03

=== Rugby ===
Originally formed in 1988 as an affiliate club for RC Lechia Gdańsk and known as Lotnik Pruszcz Gdański. The team became part of the AZS-AWFiS sports club in 2000 when the team moved to Gdańsk. As a rugby union team, the club's honours came before the integration into the AZS-AWFiS sports club, with the team finishing 3rd in the Ekstraliga in 1999–2000, and winning the Polish Cup in 2000. The rugby union club dissolved in 2006, with the AZS-AWFiS Gdańsk rugby section focusing on rugby sevens since 2008.

== Olympians ==
In total 11 ASZ AWFiS Gdańsk Olympians have won 14 Olympic medals.

Medals	Gold medal	Silver medal	Bronze medal
AZS AWFiS Gdańsk	2	6	6

The following athletes have won medals at the Olympics;

Rome 1960

- Jarosława Jóźwiakowska: 2nd Women's high jump

Barcelona 1992

- Maciej Łasicki: 3rd Coxed four
- Cezary Siess: 3rd Men's team foil
- Ryszard Sobczak: 3rd Men's team foil
- Tomasz Tomiak: 3rd Coxed four

Atlanta 1996

- Jarosław Rodzewicz: 2nd Men's team foil
- Ryszard Sobczak: 2nd Men's team foil

Sydney 2000

- Leszek Blanik: 3rd Men's vault
- Sylwia Gruchała: 2nd Women's team foil
- Magdalena Mroczkiewicz: 2nd Women's team foil
- Anna Rybicka: 2nd Women's team foil

Athens 2004

- Sylwia Gruchała: 3rd Women's foil

Beijing 2008

- Leszek Blanik: 1st Men's vault
- Adam Korol: 1st Men's quadruple sculls

== See also ==
- Sport in Gdańsk
- Sports in Poland
