= 1992 European Fencing Championships =

The 1992 European Fencing Championships were held in Lisbon, Portugal. The competition consisted of individual events only.

== Medal summary ==
=== Men's events ===
Event	Gold	Silver	Bronze
Foil	Michael Ludwig (AUT)	Márk Marsi (HUN)	Ola Kajbjer (SWE); Laurent Bel (FRA)
Épée	Michael Flegler (GER)	Günter Krajewski (GER)	Reinhard Berger (GER); César González (SPA)
Sabre	Raffaello Caserta (ITA)	Jean-Philippe Daurelle (FRA)	György Boros (HUN); Luigi Tarantino (ITA)

=== Women's events ===
Event	Gold	Silver	Bronze
Foil	Sabine Bau (GER)	Aida Mohamed (HUN)	Rosalia Huszti (GER); Sofia Shesnovich (BLR)
Épée	Marina Várkonyi (HUN)	Elisabeth Knechtl (AUT)	Laura Chiesa (ITA); Renate Riebandt-Kaspar (GER)

=== Medal table ===
Rank	Nation	Gold	Silver	Bronze	Total
1	Germany	2	1	3	6
2	Hungary	1	2	1	4
3	Austria	1	1	0	2
4	Italy	1	0	2	3
5	France	0	1	1	2
6	Belarus	0	0	1	1
6	Spain	0	0	1	1
6	Sweden	0	0	1	1
Totals (8 entries)		5	5	10	20
