= Hermenegildo García =

Hermenegildo García may refer to:

- Hermenegildo García (footballer) (1884–1965), Spanish-Argentine artist and footballer
- Hermenegildo García (fencer) (born 1968), Cuban fencer
