= Robert Kiss =

Robert Kiss may refer to:

- Róbert Kiss (born 1967), Hungarian fencer
- Robert S. Kiss (1957–2021), American politician
