= Elisabeth Knechtl =

Austrian épée fencer

Personal information
- Born: 21 June 1971 (age 55) Graz, Austria

Fencing career
- Sport: Fencing
- Weapon: épée
- Hand: right-handed
- FIE ranking: archive
Medal record
Women's épée
Representing Austria
European Championships
Silver medal – second place	1991 Vienna	Team épée
Silver medal – second place	1992 Lisbon	Individual épée
Summer Universiade
Bronze medal – third place	1993 Buffalo	Individual épée

Elisabeth Knechtl (born 21 June 1971) is an Austrian épée fencer. She earned a bronze medal at the 1991 Junior World Championships and a silver medal at the 1992 European Championships. She won the 1992–93 Fencing World Cup series by a single point over Switzerland's Gianna Bürki.
