= Ricardo Perrone =

Spanish water polo player (born 1976)

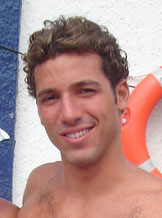

Personal information
- Born: 21 December 1976 (age 49) Rio de Janeiro, Brazil

Sport
- Sport: Water polo
Medal record
Representing Spain
World Championships
Bronze medal – third place	2007 Melbourne	Team competition
European Championship
Bronze medal – third place	2006 Belgrade	Team competition
Representing Brazil
Pan American Games
Silver medal – second place	1995 Mar del Plata	Team competition

Ricardo Perrone (born 21 December 1976) is a Spanish water polo player who competed in the 2008 Summer Olympics.

== See also ==
- List of World Aquatics Championships medalists in water polo
