= Water polo at the 1995 Pan American Games =

Water polo was contested for men only at the 1995 Pan American Games in Mar del Plata, Argentina.

== Competing teams ==
Seven teams contested the event.

- Argentina
- Brazil
- Canada
- Cuba
- Mexico
- Puerto Rico
- United States

== Medalists ==
Event	Gold	Silver	Bronze
Men's water polo	United States; Christopher Duplanty; Craig Kredell; Colin Keely; Kyle Kopp; Douglas Kimbell; Gavin Arroyo; Alexis Rousseau; John McNair; Kirk Everist; Christopher Humbert; Jeremy Laster; Christopher Oeding; Daniel Hackett	Brazil; Paulo Fernandes; Rodrigo Fernandes; Diogo Freitas; Ricardo Perrone; Guilherme Pinciroli; Roberto Chiappini; Armando Gutfrund; Eric Borges; Erik Seegerer; Adrian Marsili; Alexandre Lopez; Michel Vieira; Daniel Mameri	Cuba; Jose Ramos Soler; Ivan Cardenas; Yuri Biart Camellar; Ramon Campoalege; Pedro Biart Camellar; Juan Hernández Silveira; Guillermo Martinez; Luis Cruz; Rances Villavicencio; Ernesto Garcia Rivero; Luis Sorey Rodriguez; Jorge del Valle; Juan Hernández Olivera
