= Giovanni Sirovich =

Italian fencer (born 1971)

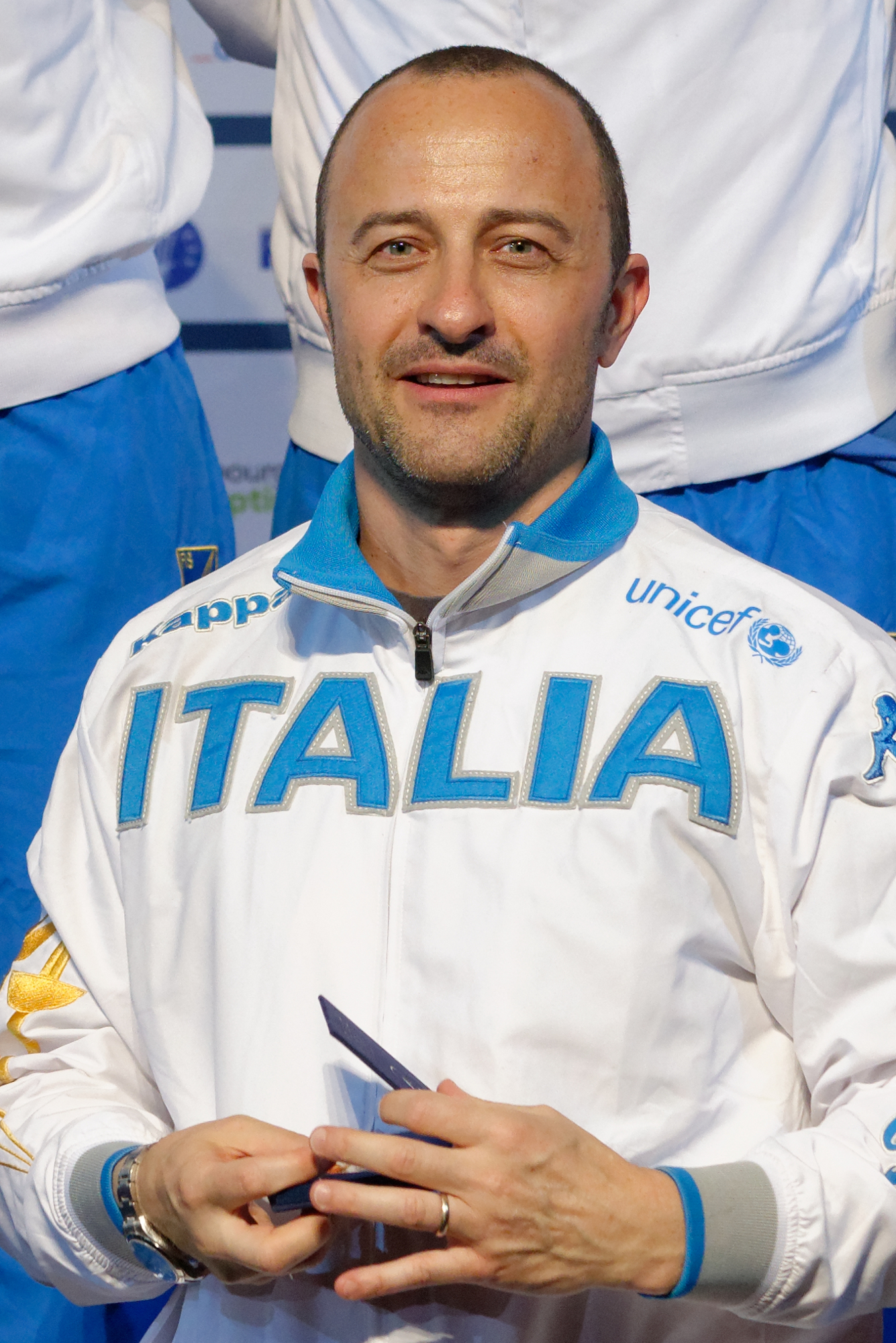
- At the 2014 European Fencing Championships

Personal information
- Born: 8 September 1971 (age 55) Rome, Italy

Fencing career
- Sport: Fencing
- Weapon: Sabre
- Hand: left-handed
Medal record
World Championships
Silver medal – second place	1993 Essen	Team sabre
Summer Universiade
Gold medal – first place	1993 Buffalo	Individual sabre
Gold medal – first place	1993 Buffalo	Team sabre

Giovanni Sirovich (born 8 September 1971) is an Italian sabre fencer. He competed in the men's team sabre at the 1992 Summer Olympics. He won the gold medal in the 1993 Summer Universiade and the same year a team silver medal in the World Championships. He became a fencing coach after his retirement as an athlete. He is now technical director for sabre at the Federazione Italiana Scherma.
