= Walter Torres =

Filipino fencer

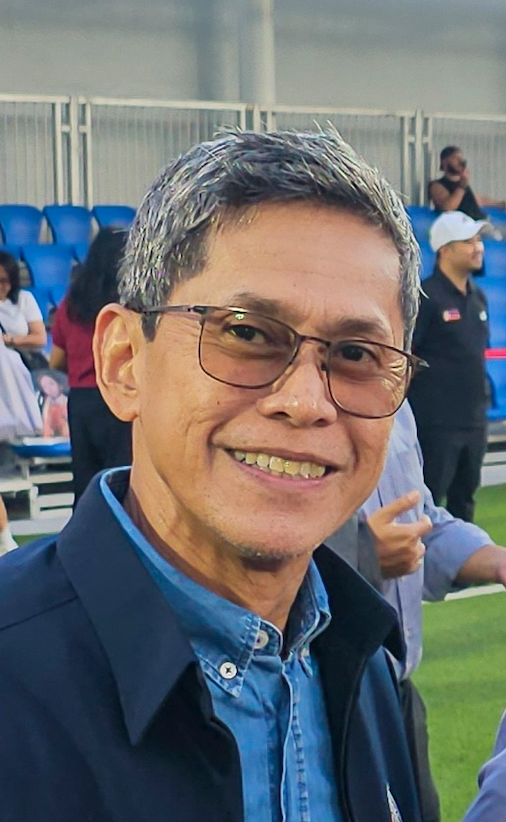
- Torres in 2025

Personal information
- Born: Walter Francis K. Torres; December 3, 1967 (age 58)

Fencing career
- Sport: Fencing
- Weapon: Foil

Walter Francis K. Torres (born December 3, 1967) is a Filipino sports administrator and former fencer who currently serves as a commissioner of the Philippine Sports Commission since 2022. Torres competed in the individual foil event at the 1992 Summer Olympics.
