= Norge Blay =

Cuban water polo player (born 1967)

Personal information
- Nationality: Cuban
- Born: 21 May 1967 (age 57)

Sport
- Sport: Water polo

Norge Blay (born 21 May 1967) is a Cuban water polo player. He competed in the men's tournament at the 1992 Summer Olympics.
