= Ernesto García (water polo) =

Cuban water polo player (born 1969)

Ernesto García Pinheiro
Personal information
- Nationality: Cuban
- Born: 14 June 1969 (age 57)

Sport
- Sport: Water polo
Medal record
Representing Cuba
Pan American Games
Bronze medal – third place	1995 Mar del Plata	Team competition

Ernesto García Pinheiro (born 14 June 1969) is a Cuban water polo player. He competed in the men's tournament at the 1992 Summer Olympics.
