= José Ángel Ramos =

Cuban water polo player (born 1964)

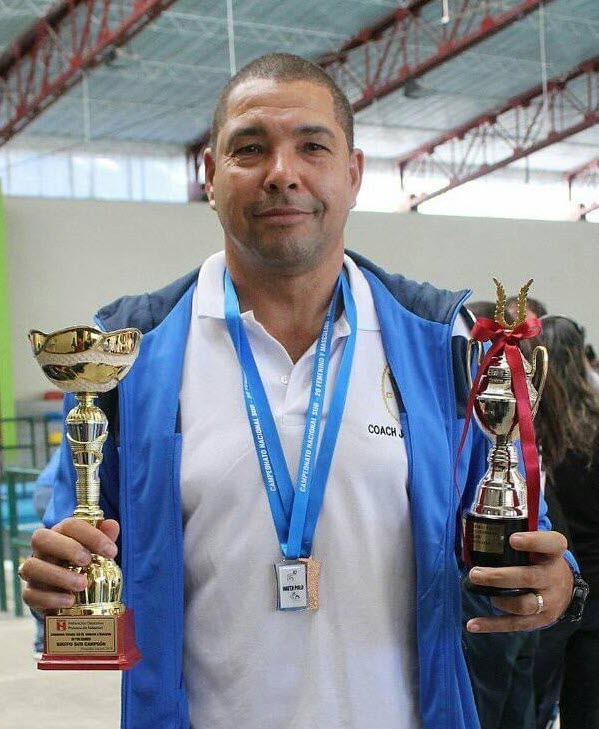
- José Ángel Ramos

Personal information
- Full name: José Ángel Ramos Soler
- Nickname: Bolondrón
- Nationality: Cuban
- Born: 7 March 1964 (age 62) Bolondrón Matanzas, Cuba

Sport
- Country: Cuba
- Sport: Water polo
- Position: Goalkeeper
- Retired: 2003
Medal record
Representing Cuba
Pan American Games
Bronze medal – third place	1999 Winnipeg	Water polo
Silver medal – second place	1995 Mar del Plata	Water polo
Gold medal – first place	1991 Havana	Water polo
Silver medal – second place	1987 indianapolis	Water polo
Central American and Caribbean Games
Gold medal – first place	1998 Maracaibo	Water polo
Gold medal – first place	1993 Ponce	Water polo
Gold medal – first place	1990 Mexico City	Water polo
Gold medal – first place	1986 Santiago de los Caballeros	Water polo
Summer Universiade
Silver medal – second place	1987 Zagreb	Water polo
Bronze medal – third place	1985 Kobe	Water polo
Bronze medal – third place	1983 Edmonton	Water polo

José Ángel Ramos (born 7 March 1964), also known as Bolondrón is a retired Cuban water polo goalkeeper and coach. He represented the Cuban National Water Polo Team at the highest levels of international competition, participating in four Central American and Caribbean Games, four Pan American Games, two FINA Water Polo World League, three World Championships, three Olympic Qualification Tournaments, and one Olympic Games.

Following his retirement as a player, he transitioned into coaching and has since worked at the national-team level in both Cuba and Peru, bringing extensive international playing experience to the development of elite water polo athletes.

== Early life ==
José Ángel Ramos was born in Bolondrón, in the Cuban province of Matanzas. He left the town — in the municipality of Pedro Betancourt — at the age of eight for the Luis Augusto Turcios Lima sports-initiation school (EIDE) in Varadero. There, under coach Lino Socorro, he took up the goalkeeping position he would occupy for the rest of his career, and was nicknamed "Bolondrón" after his home town — a name he has been known by since. He progressed to the Marcelo Salado national aquatics school in Havana, where he met the coach Juan Almeneiros, who accompanied him through much of his career.

Ramos has described the Cuban goalkeeper Oscar Periche Cardet, known as "El Pulpo", as his mentor. The two spent four years together in the national squad before Ramos succeeded him as first-choice goalkeeper.

== Playing career and achievements ==
José Ángel Ramos spent 23 years with the Cuban national team. Over that period he took part in four Central American and Caribbean Games, four Pan American Games, three World Championships, two World Cups, three Olympic qualifying tournaments and one Olympic Games.

At the 1992 Summer Olympics in Barcelona he competed in the men's tournament, in which Cuba finished eighth.

The high point of his playing career came at the 1991 Pan American Games in Havana, where Cuba beat the reigning World Cup champions, the United States of America, 8–5 in the final at the Ciudad Deportiva pool on 13 August 1991. Both sides had reached the final unbeaten, and Ramos kept the United States of America scoreless in the opening period. It remains Cuba's only continental title in the sport.

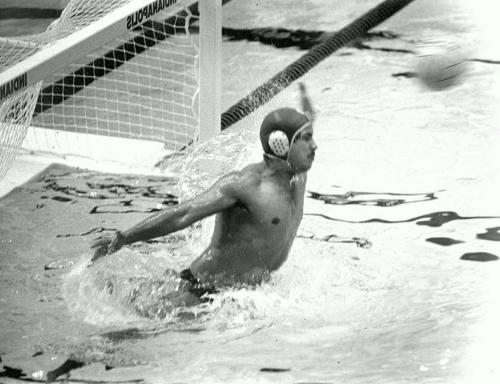
Jose Angel Ramos during 1987 Pan American Games in Indianapolis, USA

He won three further Pan American Games medals with Cuba: silver at the 1987 Games in Indianapolis and the 1999 Games in Winnipeg, and bronze at the 1995 Games in Mar del Plata. He also won gold at the Central American and Caribbean Games in 1986, 1990, 1993 and 1998, and a silver medal in water polo at the 1987 Summer Universiade in Zagreb.

He additionally represented Cuba at the 1986 World Aquatics Championships in Madrid and the 1994 World Aquatics Championships in Rome, and retired from competition at the age of 39.

== Coaching career ==
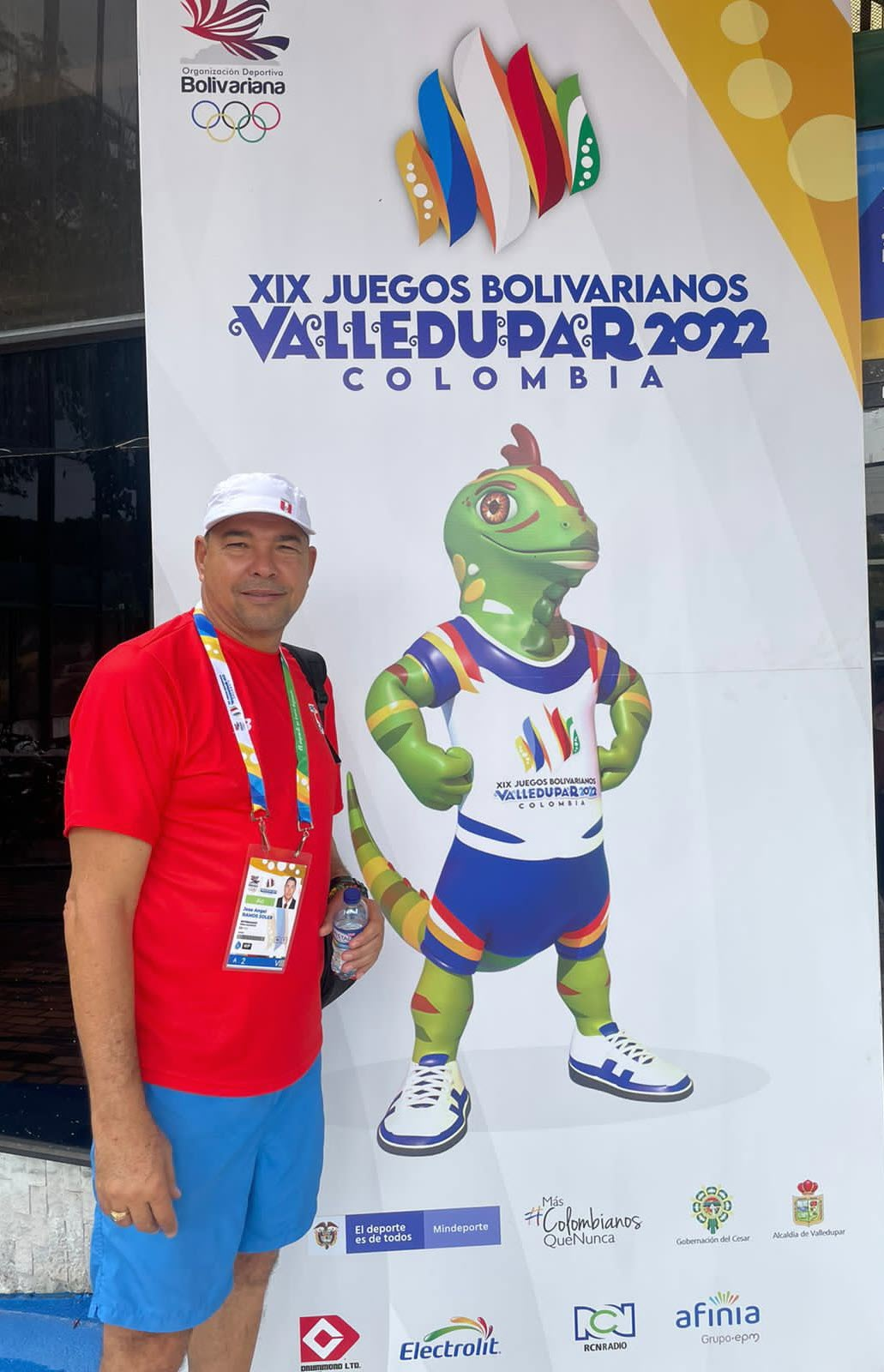
José Ángel Ramos as head coach of the Peru women's national water polo team

After retiring, José Ángel Ramos began coaching in Cuba's youth categories. He holds a degree in physical culture and sport with a specialisation in water polo.

By 2014, he was serving as head coach of the Cuban women's national water polo team. The 2014 Central American and Caribbean Games in Veracruz marked his first international competition as head coach of a national team.[2] He later also served on the coaching staff of the Cuban men's national team.

José Ángel Ramos subsequently moved to Peru, where he was appointed Technical Director of water polo at the Club de Regatas Lima.

José Ángel Ramos also served as the head coach of the Peruvian women's national water polo team at the 2019 Pan American Games in Lima, Peru.

As coach of the Peruvian women's national team, José Ángel Ramos led the side to the gold medal in water polo at the 2022 Bolivarian Games in Valledupar, Colombia. Under his leadership, Peru defeated Colombia 7–6 and drew 13–13 with Venezuela in the final round on 28 June 2022, securing the tournament title and Peru's tenth medal of the Games.
