= Juan Carlos Barreras =

Cuban water polo player (born 1964)

Personal information
- Nationality: Cuban
- Born: 13 March 1964 (age 61)

Sport
- Sport: Water polo

Juan Carlos Barreras (born 13 March 1964) is a Cuban water polo player. He competed in the men's tournament at the 1992 Summer Olympics.
