= Juan Carlos Hernández Nava =

Mexican film director, producer, and writer (b. 1967)

- Born: 1967/04/08; Toluca, Mexico
- Occupations: Film director, producer, screenwriter, actor, editor
- Years active: 1998–present
- Television: TV Azteca
- Title: International Correspondant
- Website: https://www.youtube.com/@CONVENCEMESHOW

Juan Carlos Hernández is a Mexican director, actor, and producer of film and television.

== Biography ==
Hernández was born in Toluca, Mexico.[1]

In 1995, Hernández moved to San Antonio, Texas.

In1998, He became an international news correspondent for Television Azteca in and began covering global events for Mexican audiences.

In 2004 He became the news director and founder of Azteca America in San Antonio, Texas.I

n 2006, Hernández partnered with Tatiana Smithhart to create Eagle Eye Productions, a new production company that specialized in television shows, documentaries, and feature films.[2]

In 2008, the company produced the feature film Secuestrada, starring Irma Dorantes, Eric del Castillo, and Danny de la Paz.[3]

He produced he's third film in San Antonio, Texas called "Patricia" with Eric Del Castillo, Claudia Troyo, Agustin Arana and Alejandro Ruiz, with a limited national edition on Theaters nation wide in more than 360 rooms.

In 2011 he founded along with Mr. Eric del Castillo the first professional Acting in Spanish in U.S.A. called Eagle Eye Art Academy by 2018 he have two more schools one in Houston Texas and the other one in Miami, Fl.

In 2022 write hi's first book named "Redención" publish in Amazon and Barnes And Noble https://a.co/d/giR8GVf

In 2024 he start the Youtube Channel "Convenceme Show" https://www.youtube.com/@CONVENCEMESHOW

== Filmography ==
- 1998: Liberación, Channel 23, San Antonio, Texas
- 1999: Jubilee Alive, Channel 23, San Antonio, Texas
- 2000: El Manual (Documentary)
- 2001: El Manual (TV series), Telemundo, Channel 60, San Antonio, Texas
- 2002: Una Nación Bendecida (Documentary)
- 2004: Pioneer of Azteca America's San Antonio, Texas, Channel 31
- 2005: The Reporter (Feature film)
- 2006: Mi Viejo San Antonio (TV show)
- 2007: Soluciones, Azteca America, Channel 31
- 2008: Secuestrada (Feature film)
- 2011: Patricia (Feature film)
