= Guillermo Martínez Ginoris =

Cuban water polo player (born 1943)

Personal information
- Born: 25 June 1943 (age 83) Havana, Cuba

Sport
- Sport: Water polo
Medal record
Representing Cuba
Pan American Games
Bronze medal – third place	1995 Mar del Plata	Men's tournament

Guillermo Martínez Ginoris (born 25 June 1943) is a Cuban water polo player. He competed at the 1968 Summer Olympics and the 1972 Summer Olympics.
