= José Guimarães (fencer) =

Portuguese fencer

Personal information
- Born: 2 February 1965 (age 61) Grande Porto, Portugal

Sport
- Sport: Fencing

José Guimarães (born 2 February 1965) is a Portuguese fencer. He competed in the individual foil event at the 1992 Summer Olympics.
