= Zsolt Németh (fencer) =

Hungarian fencer

Personal information
- Born: 19 July 1963 (age 62) Budapest, Hungary

Sport
- Sport: Fencing

Zsolt Németh (born 19 July 1963) is a Hungarian fencer. He competed in the team foil event at the 1992 Summer Olympics.
