= Wu Xing Yao =

Hong Kong fencer

Personal information
- Born: 22 February 1965 (age 61)

Sport
- Sport: Fencing

Wu Xing Yao (Chinese: 伍 星耀; pinyin: Wǔ Xīngyào; Jyutping: ng5 sing1 jiu6; born 22 February 1965) is a Hong Kong fencer. He competed in the individual foil event at the 1992 Summer Olympics.
