= Lazaro Fernández =

Cuban water polo player (1970–2023)

Personal information
- Nationality: Cuban
- Born: 11 February 1970
- Died: 25 April 2023 (aged 53); Miami Beach, Florida, United States

Sport
- Sport: Water polo

Lazaro Fernández (11 February 1970 – 25 April 2023) was a Cuban water polo player. He competed in the men's tournament at the 1992 Summer Olympics.
