= Marcelo Derouville =

Cuban water polo player (born 1962)

Personal information
- Nationality: Cuban
- Born: 9 August 1962 (age 62)

Sport
- Sport: Water polo

Marcelo Derouville (born 9 August 1962) is a Cuban water polo player. He competed in the men's tournament at the 1992 Summer Olympics.
