= Kinya Abe =

Japanese fencer

Personal information
- Born: 3 March 1969 (age 57) Akita, Japan

Sport
- Sport: Fencing

Kinya Abe (安部 欣哉, Abe Kin'ya; born 3 March 1969) is a Japanese fencer. He competed in the individual foil event at the 1992 Summer Olympics.
