= Jorge del Valle =

Cuban water polo player (born 1961)

Personal information
- Nationality: Cuban
- Born: 10 August 1961 (age 64)

Sport
- Sport: Water polo
Medal record
Representing Cuba
Pan American Games
Bronze medal – third place	1995 Mar del Plata	Team competition

Jorge del Valle (born 10 August 1961) is a Cuban water polo player. He competed in the men's tournament at the 1992 Summer Olympics.
