= Maged Abdallah =

Egyptian fencer

Personal information
- Born: 1 January 1970 (age 56)

Sport
- Sport: Fencing

Maged Abdallah (born 1 January 1970) is an Egyptian fencer. He competed in the individual foil event at the 1992 Summer Olympics.
