= Ye Chong =

Chinese fencer

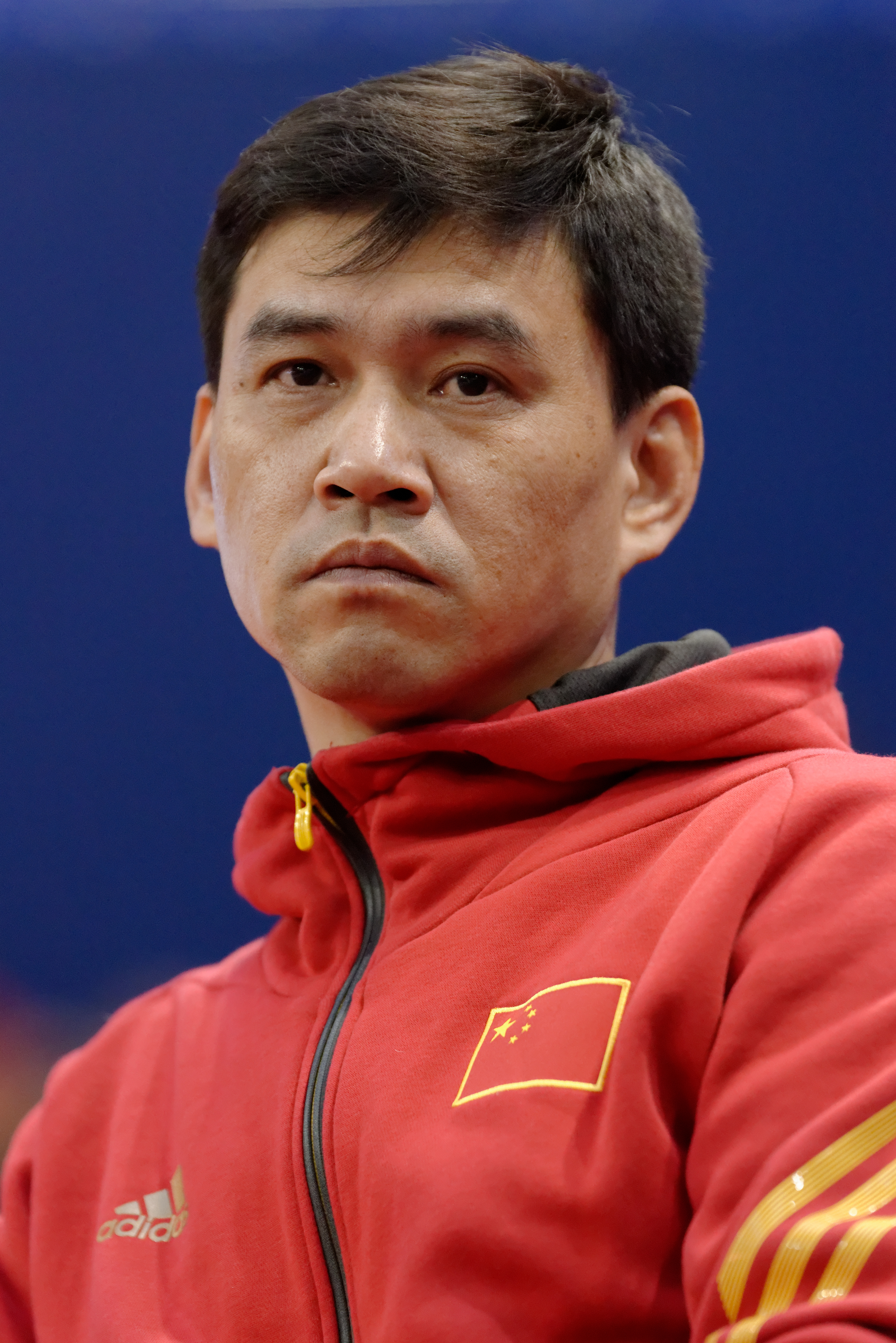

Personal information
- Born: 29 November 1969 (age 56) Jiangsu, China

Sport
- Sport: Fencing
- Coached by: Yang Jian Chuan
- Now coaching: Chinese National Fencing team
Medal record
Men's fencing
Representing China
Olympic Games
Silver medal – second place	2000 Sydney	team foil
Silver medal – second place	2004 Athens	team foil

Ye Chong (simplified Chinese: 叶冲; traditional Chinese: 葉沖; pinyin: Yè Chōng; born November 29, 1969, in Jiangsu) is a male Chinese foil fencer who competed at the 1988, 1992, 1996, 2000 and 2004 Summer Olympics. He was the junior world champion in Athens in 1989.

He first competed at the Olympics in 1988 where he finished eighth with the Chinese foil team in the Olympic team foil event.

Four years later he finished ninth in the individual Olympic foil tournament and tenth with the Chinese foil team in the team event.

In 1996 he was eliminated in the round of 16 of the Olympic foil tournament and finished ninth with the Chinese foil team in the team event.

Four years later he won the silver medal as part of the Chinese foil team. In the 2000 Olympic foil tournament he was eliminated in the round of 16 again.

In 2004 he won the silver medal again as a member of the Chinese foil team.
