= Ingo Weißenborn =

German fencer

Personal information
- Born: 29 November 1963 (age 62) Bernburg, Bezirk Halle, East Germany
- Height: 1.68 m (5 ft 6 in)
- Weight: 63 kg (139 lb)

Sport
- Sport: Fencing
Medal record
Men's fencing
Olympic Games
Representing Germany
Gold medal – first place	1992 Barcelona	Foil, team

Ingo Weißenborn (born 29 November 1963 in Bernburg) is a German fencer. He won a gold medal in the team foil event at the 1992 Summer Olympics.
