= Juan Hernández Giménez =

Juan Hernández Giménez (1914–2006) was a Spanish aviator and spy for the French Resistance during the German occupation of France in World War II. He was born on May 17, 1914, in La Union, Murcia, Spain and died in France in 2006. He was the son of a humble miner with the Peñarroya firm. He died in France at the age of 92. His final resting place is in Oloron-Sainte-Marie.

== Education and career ==
While still a boy Giménez had to work as a grocery clerk but, by studying alone in his spare time, he obtained his high school diploma in 1934.

A year later he joined the Aviation Arm in El Prat de Llobregat as a soldier, where he was involved in battle during the fascist uprising of 1936.

Tall (1.80m) and well built, he was an escort for Lieutenant Colonel Felipe Diaz-Sandino, Chief of the base, during the war. He often accompanied him on his meetings in Barcelona with Lluís Companys, President of the Generalitat of Catalonia.

As pilot of the Polikarpov RZ "Natacha", he participated in the battles of Guadalajara, Brunete, Teruel, Belchite and Ebro conducting bombing missions and coming under attack by domestic forces.

== Exile ==
In February 1939, wearing the uniform of pilot Katiuska, he crossed the Pyrenees to go into exile in France. He was admitted to the Concentration Camp in Argelès-sur-Mer. There he was again involved with the Second World War. He was taken to serve in the German Submarine Base in Bordeaux. He passed on, to the Résistance forces, valuable information on the types of German fortifications, which then reached the British High Command.

When World War II ended, he worked as Turner Operator in the Messier Hispanic-Swiss Factory, Bugatti in Oloron-Sainte-Marie. There he married the Spaniard Esperanza Miguel Portero.

He returned to Spain in 1958, after 19 years of absence. Many years later, in 1985, the Spanish Defense Ministry granted him the category of Commander of the Air Force, and the corresponding pension, as if he had continued being active in the Aviation Arm since 1939.
