= Palau de la Metal·lúrgia =

Sports venue in Barcelona, Spain

Coordinates: 41°22′25″N 2°08′58″E

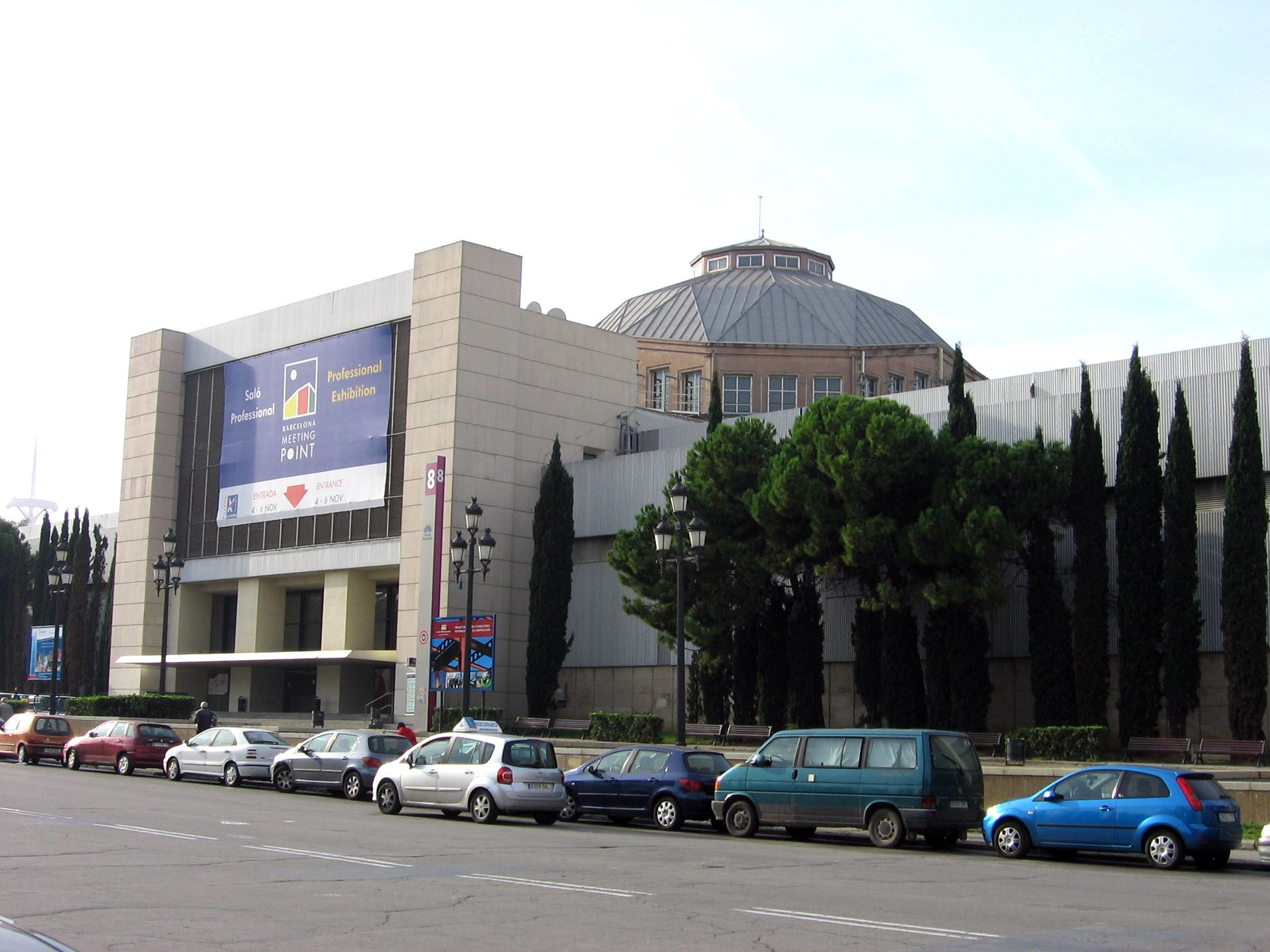
Palau de la Metal·lúrgia

The Palau de la Metal·lúrgia (English: Metallurgical place) is a venue located in Barcelona. Constructed for the 1929 International Exposition, it hosted the fencing and the fencing part of the modern pentathlon events for the 1992 Summer Olympics.
