= Thorsten Weidner =

German fencer

Personal information
- Born: 29 December 1967 (age 58) Lauda-Königshofen, Baden-Württemberg, West Germany

Sport
- Sport: Fencing
Medal record
Men's fencing
Olympic Games
Representing West Germany
Silver medal – second place	1988 Seoul	Foil, team
Representing Germany
Gold medal – first place	1992 Barcelona	Foil, team

Thorsten Weidner (born 29 December 1967) is a German fencer. He won a silver medal in the team foil event at the 1988 Summer Olympics and a gold in the same event at the 1992 Summer Olympics.

== Biography ==
Thorsten Weidner attended the Kaufmännische Schule Tauberbischofsheim and fought for the Fencing-Club Tauberbischofsheim.
