= Anatol Richter =

Austrian fencer

Personal information
- Born: 21 July 1970 (age 55) Vienna, Austria

Sport
- Sport: Fencing

Anatol Richter (born 21 July 1970) is an Austrian fencer. He competed in the foil events at the 1988 and 1992 Summer Olympics.
