= Patrick Groc =

French fencer (born 1960)

Personal information
- Born: 6 September 1960 (age 65) Neuilly-sur-Seine, France

Sport
- Sport: Fencing
Medal record
Men's fencing
Representing France
Olympic Games
Bronze medal – third place	1984 Los Angeles	Foil, team

Patrick Groc (born 6 September 1960) is a French fencer. He won a bronze medal in the team foil event at the 1984 Summer Olympics.
