= Juan Hernández Olivera =

Cuban water polo player (born 1966)

Personal information
- Nationality: Cuban
- Born: 14 January 1966 (age 60)

Sport
- Sport: Water polo
Medal record
Representing Cuba
Pan American Games
Bronze medal – third place	1995 Mar del Plata	Team competition

Juan Hernández Olivera (born 14 January 1966) is a Cuban water polo player. He competed in the men's tournament at the 1992 Summer Olympics.
