= Jonathan Davis (fencer) =

British fencer

Personal information
- Born: 4 November 1960 (age 65) Dungannon, Northern Ireland

Sport
- Sport: Fencing

Jonathan Davis (born 4 November 1960) is a British fencer from Northern Ireland.

== Professional career ==
He competed in the foil events at the 1988 and 1992 Summer Olympics.
