= Juan Hernández Silveira =

Cuban water polo player (born 1968)

Personal information
- Nationality: Cuban
- Born: 22 May 1968 (age 58)

Sport
- Sport: Water polo
Medal record
Representing Cuba
Pan American Games
Bronze medal – third place	1995 Mar del Plata	Team competition

Juan Hernández Silveira (born 22 May 1968) is a Cuban water polo player. He competed in the men's tournament at the 1992 Summer Olympics.
