= Vyacheslav Grigoryev =

Kazakhstani fencer (born 1967)

Personal information
- Nationality: Kazakhstani
- Born: 6 April 1967 (age 59)

Sport
- Sport: Fencing
- Club: Fencing Academy of Westchester

Vyacheslav Grigoryev (born 6 April 1967) is a Kazakhstani foil fencer. He competed for the Unified Team at the 1992 Summer Olympics and for Kazakhstan at the 1996 Summer Olympics.
