= Ramiro Bravo =

Spanish fencer

Ramiro Bravo Díaz
Personal information
- Full name: Ramiro Bravo Díaz
- Born: 29 May 1962 (age 64) La Coruña, Spain

Sport
- Sport: Fencing

Ramiro Bravo (born 29 May 1962) is a Spanish fencer. He competed in the individual and team foil events at the 1992 Summer Olympics.
