= Andrés García (fencer) =

Spanish fencer

Personal information
- Born: 18 July 1967 (age 58) León, Spain

Sport
- Sport: Fencing

Andrés García (born 18 July 1967) is a Spanish fencer. He competed in the foil events at the 1988 and 1992 Summer Olympics.
