= Tulio Díaz =

Cuban fencer (born 1960)

Personal information
- Born: 1 June 1960 (age 66)

Sport
- Sport: Fencing
Medal record
Men's fencing
Representing Cuba
Olympic Games
Silver medal – second place	1992 Barcelona	Foil, team

Tulio Díaz (born 1 June 1960) is a Cuban fencer. He won a silver medal in the team foil event at the 1992 Summer Olympics.
