= Marian Sypniewski =

Polish fencer (born 1955)

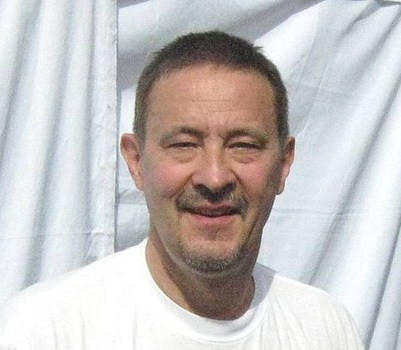

Personal information
- Born: 30 April 1955 (age 71) Bydgoszcz, Poland

Sport
- Sport: Fencing
Medal record
Men's fencing
Representing Poland
Olympic Games
Bronze medal – third place	1980 Moscow	Foil, team
Bronze medal – third place	1992 Barcelona	Foil, team

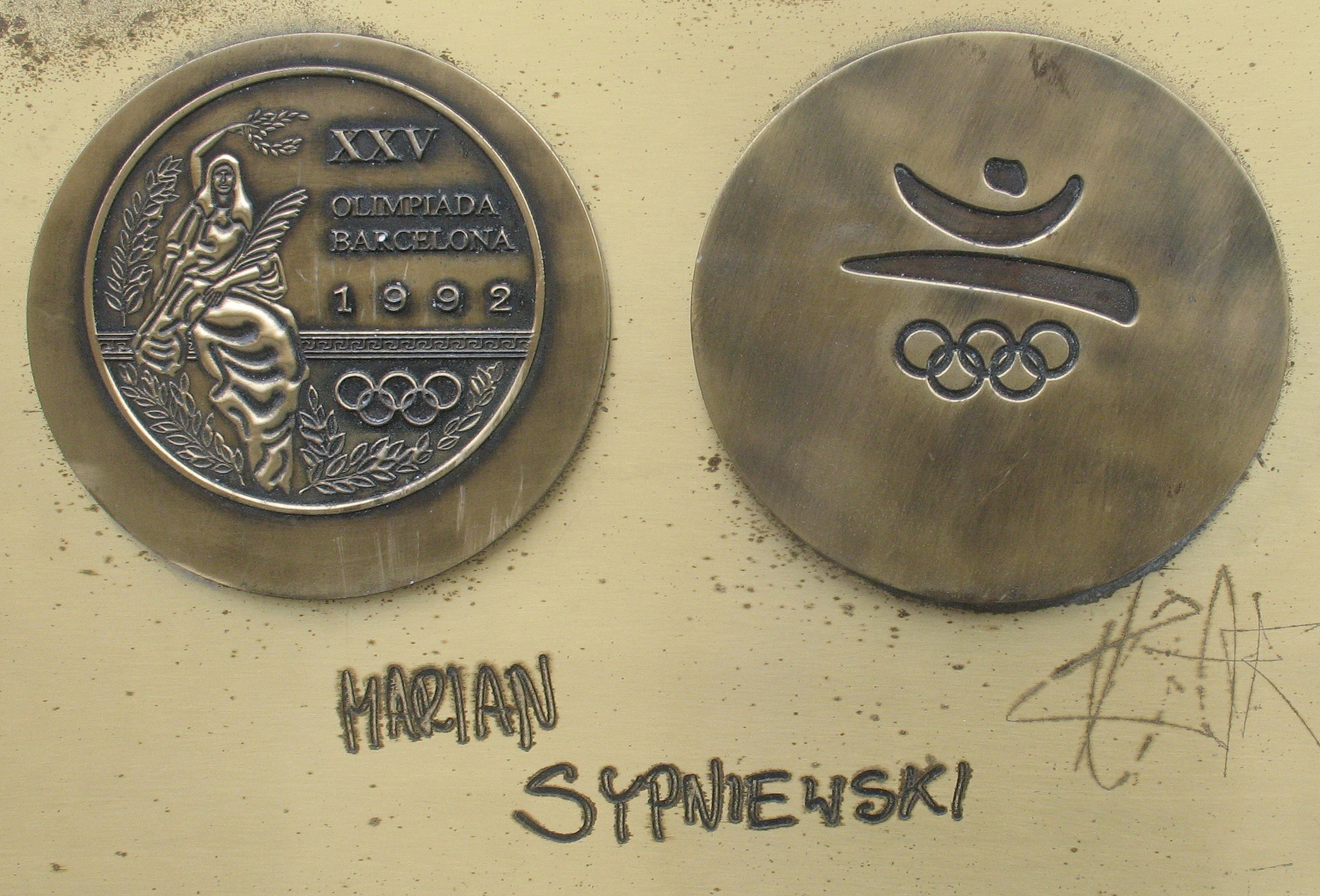
Copy of M. Sypniewski medal and autograph in Sports Star Avenue in Dziwnów

Marian Sypniewski (born 30 April 1955) is a Polish fencer. He won bronze medals in the team foil events at the 1980 and 1992 Summer Olympics.
