= Alexander Koch (fencer) =

German fencer

Personal information
- Born: 22 February 1969 (age 57) Bonn, West Germany

Sport
- Sport: Fencing
Medal record
Representing Germany
Olympic Games
Gold medal – first place	1992 Barcelona	Team foil
World Championships
Gold medal – first place	1989 Denver	Individual foil
Gold medal – first place	1993 Essen	Individual foil
Gold medal – first place	1993 Essen	Team foil
Silver medal – second place	1989 Denver	Team foil
Silver medal – second place	1994 Athens	Team foil
Summer Universiade
Silver medal – second place	1993 Buffalo	Individual foil

Alexander Koch (born 22 February 1969) is a German fencer. He won a gold medal in the team foil event at the 1992 Summer Olympics.
