= José Francisco Guerra =

Spanish fencer

Personal information
- Full name: José Francisco Guerra Iglesias
- Born: 22 June 1968 (age 58) Burgos, Spain

Sport
- Sport: Fencing

José Francisco Guerra Iglesias (Note: In this Spanish name, the first or paternal surname is Guerra and the second or maternal family name is Iglesias.) (born 22 June 1968) is a Spanish fencer. He competed in the foil events at the 1992 and 1996 Summer Olympics.
