= Jarosław Rodzewicz =

Polish fencer (born 1973)

Personal information
- Born: 11 May 1973 (age 53) Gdynia, Poland

Sport
- Sport: Fencing
Medal record
Men's fencing
Representing Poland
Olympic Games
Silver medal – second place	1996 Atlanta	Foil, team

Jarosław Rodzewicz (born 11 May 1973) is a Polish fencer. He won a silver medal in the team foil event at the 1996 Summer Olympics.
