= Elvis Gregory =

Cuban fencer (born 1971)

Personal information
- Born: 18 May 1971 (age 55) Havana, Cuba

Sport
- Sport: Fencing
Medal record
Men's fencing
Representing Cuba
Olympic Games
Silver medal – second place	1992 Barcelona	Team foil
Bronze medal – third place	1992 Barcelona	Individual foil
Bronze medal – third place	1996 Atlanta	Team foil
World Championships
Gold medal – first place	1991 Budapest	Team foil
Gold medal – first place	1995 The Hague	Team foil
Silver medal – second place	1997 Cape Town	Team foil
Silver medal – second place	1998 La-Chaux-du-Fonds	Individual foil
Bronze medal – third place	2001 Nîmes	Team foil
Summer Universiade
Gold medal – first place	1989 Duisburg	Team foil
Gold medal – first place	1993 Buffalo	Team foil
Gold medal – first place	1995 Fukuoka	Individual foil
Silver medal – second place	1997 Catania	Team foil
Pan American Games
Gold medal – first place	1991 Havana	Team foil
Gold medal – first place	1995 Mar del Plata	Individual foil
Gold medal – first place	1995 Mar del Plata	Team foil
Gold medal – first place	1999 Winnipeg	Team foil
Silver medal – second place	1991 Havana	Individual foil
Silver medal – second place	1999 Winnipeg	Individual foil
Silver medal – second place	1999 Winnipeg	Team sabre

Elvis Gregory Gil (born 18 May 1971) is a Cuban fencer. He won a silver and a bronze medal in the foil events at the 1992 Summer Olympics and a bronze at the 1996 Summer Olympics.
