= Fencing at the 1993 Summer Universiade =

Fencing events were contested at the 1993 Summer Universiade in Buffalo, New York, USA.

== Medal overview ==
=== Men's events ===
Event	Gold	Silver	Bronze
Individual Foil	Sergei Golubitsky (UKR)	Alexander Koch (GER)	Lionel Plumenail (FRA); Alessandro Puccini (ITA)
Team Foil	Cuba (CUB)	Italy (ITA)	China (CHN)
Individual Épée	Patrick Dränert (GER)	Krisztián Kulcsár (HUN)	Jean-Marc Muratorio (FRA); Arnd Schmitt (GER)
Team Épée	Cuba (CUB)	Hungary (HUN)	Italy (ITA)
Individual Sabre	Giovanni Sirovich (ITA)	Gaël Touya (FRA)	Balaz Kovács (HUN); Rafal Sznajder (POL)
Team Sabre	Italy (ITA)	France (FRA)	Hungary (HUN)

=== Women's events ===
Event	Gold	Silver	Bronze
Individual Foil	Ildikó Mincza (HUN)	Anna Giacometti (ITA)	Diana Bianchedi (ITA); Giovanna Trillini (ITA)
Team Foil	Italy (ITA)	Germany (GER)	France (FRA)
Individual Épée	Mariann Horváth (HUN)	Sangita Tripathi (FRA)	Elisabeth Knechtl (AUT); Corinne Panzeri (ITA)
Team Épée	Hungary (HUN)	France (FRA)	Germany (GER)

== Medal table ==
Rank	Nation	Gold	Silver	Bronze	Total
1	Italy (ITA)	3	2	5	10
2	Hungary (HUN)	3	2	2	7
3	Cuba (CUB)	2	0	0	2
4	Germany (GER)	1	2	2	5
5	Ukraine (UKR)	1	0	0	1
6	France (FRA)	0	4	3	7
7	Austria (AUT)	0	0	1	1
7	China (CHN)	0	0	1	1
7	Poland (POL)	0	0	1	1
Totals (9 entries)		10	10	15	35
