= Marco Arpino =

Italian fencer (born 1966)

Personal information
- Born: 11 September 1966 (age 59) Rome, Italy

Sport
- Sport: Fencing
- Club: Gruppo Sportivo Fiamme Oro
- Coached by: Salvatore Di Naro, Tito Tomassini
Medal record
Men's fencing
Representing Italy
World Championships
Gold medal – first place	1994 Athens	Foil Team
Universiade
Gold medal – first place	1991 Sheffield	Foil Team
Silver medal – second place	1993 Buffalo	Foil Team
Bronze medal – third place	1987 Zagreb	Foil Team
Coupe d'Europe des clubs champions d'escrime
Gold medal – first place	1987	Foil Team

Marco Arpino (born 11 September 1966) is an Italian director at the Italian National Olympic Committee and a retired fencer. He competed in the foil events at the 1992 and 1996 Summer Olympics. He won a gold medal in the team foil event at the 1994 World Fencing Championships.
