= Guillermo Betancourt =

Cuban fencer (born 1963)

Personal information
- Full name: Guillermo Betancourt Scull
- Born: 19 July 1963 (age 62) Santiago de Cuba, Cuba

Sport
- Sport: Fencing
Medal record
Men's fencing
Representing Cuba
Olympic Games
Silver medal – second place	1992 Barcelona	Team foil
Summer Universiade
Gold medal – first place	1987 Zagreb	Team foil
Gold medal – first place	1989 Duisburg	Team foil
Bronze medal – third place	1981 Bucharest	Team foil
Pan American Games
Gold medal – first place	1987 Indianapolis	Team foil
Gold medal – first place	1987 Indianapolis	Individual foil
Gold medal – first place	1991 Havana	Team foil
Gold medal – first place	1991 Havana	Individual foil
Central American and Caribbean Games
Gold medal – first place	1986 Santiago	Team foil
Silver medal – second place	1986 Santiago	Individual foil

Guillermo Betancourt Scull (Note: In this Spanish name, the first or paternal surname is Betancourt and the second or maternal family name is Scull.) (born 19 July 1963) is a Cuban fencer. He won a silver medal in the team foil event at the 1992 Summer Olympics.
