= Piotr Kiełpikowski =

Polish fencer (born 1962)

Personal information
- Born: 27 November 1962 (age 63) Grudziądz, Poland

Sport
- Sport: Fencing
Medal record
Men's fencing
Representing Poland
Olympic Games
Silver medal – second place	1996 Atlanta	Foil, team
Bronze medal – third place	1992 Barcelona	Foil, team

Piotr Andrzej Kiełpikowski (born 27 November 1962) is a Polish fencer. He won a bronze medal in the team foil event at the 1992 Summer Olympics and a silver in the same event at the 1996 Summer Olympics.
