= Oscar García (fencer) =

Cuban fencer (born 1966)

Óscar García
Personal information
- Born: 23 December 1966 (age 59) Havana, Cuba

Sport
- Sport: Fencing
Medal record
Men's fencing
Representing Cuba
Olympic Games
Silver medal – second place	1992 Barcelona	Team foil
Bronze medal – third place	1996 Atlanta	Team foil
World Championships
Gold medal – first place	1991 Budapest	Team foil
Gold medal – first place	1995 Den Haag	Team foil
Silver medal – second place	1997 Cape Town	Team foil
Bronze medal – third place	1983 Vienna	Team foil
Bronze medal – third place	1994 Athens	Team foil
Summer Universiade
Gold medal – first place	1987 Zagreb	Team foil
Gold medal – first place	1989 Duisburg	Team foil
Gold medal – first place	1993 Buffalo	Team foil
Pan American Games
Gold medal – first place	1987 Indianapolis	Team foil
Gold medal – first place	1991 Havana	Team foil
Gold medal – first place	1995 Mar del Plata	Team foil
Gold medal – first place	1999 Winnipeg	Team foil
Central American and Caribbean Games
Gold medal – first place	1990 Mexico City	Team foil
Gold medal – first place	1993 Ponce	Team foil
Gold medal – first place	1998 Maracaibo	Team foil
Silver medal – second place	1990 Mexico City	Individual foil

Óscar Manuel García Pérez (born 23 December 1966) is a Cuban fencer. He won a silver medal in the team foil event at the 1992 Summer Olympics and a bronze in the same event at the 1996 Summer Olympics.
