= Ryszard Sobczak =

Polish fencer (born 1967)

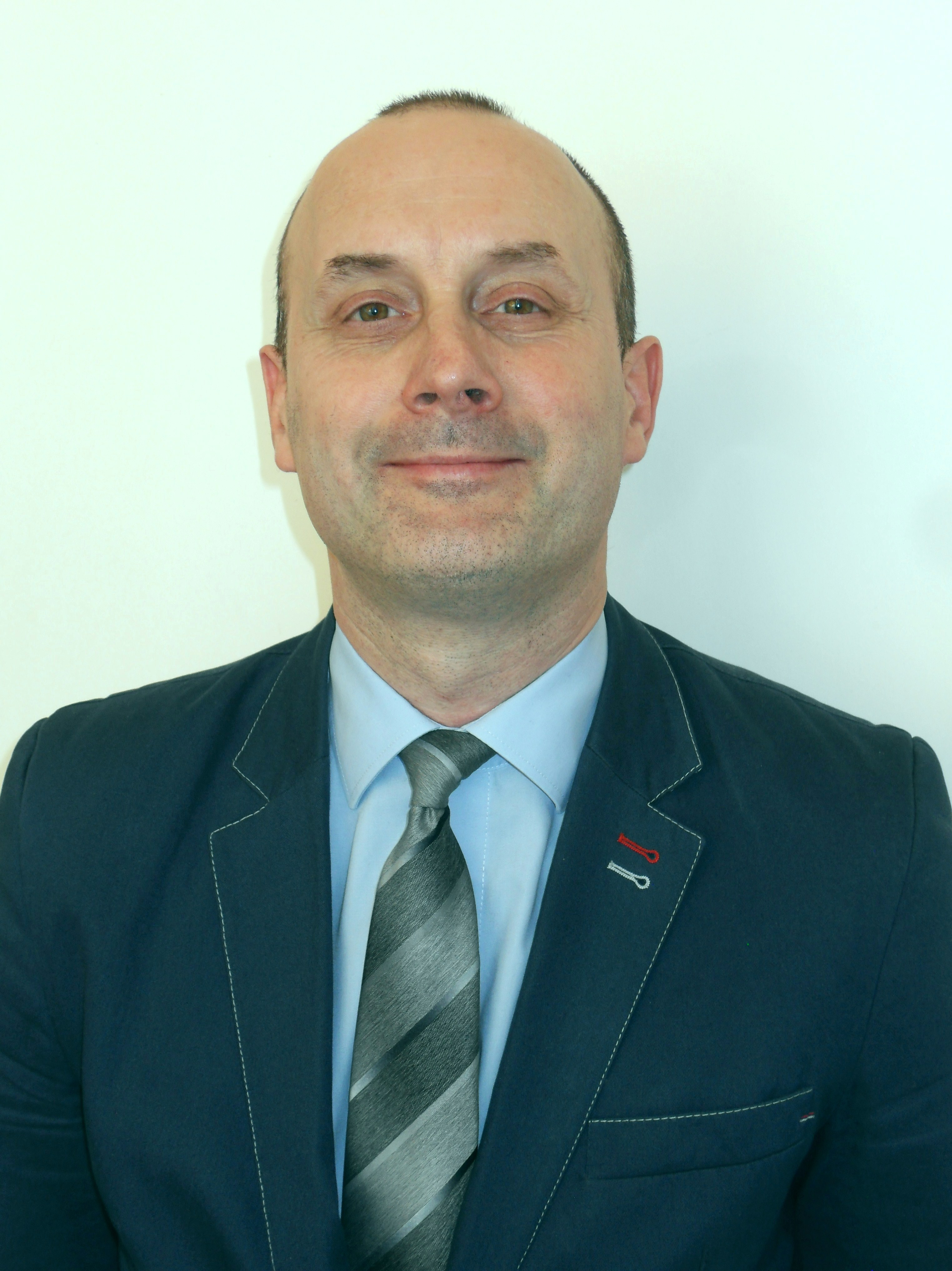

Personal information
- Born: 2 November 1967 (age 58) Zgorzelec, Poland

Sport
- Sport: Fencing
Medal record
Men's fencing
Representing Poland
Olympic Games
Silver medal – second place	1996 Atlanta	Team foil
Bronze medal – third place	1992 Barcelona	Team foil
World Championships
Gold medal – first place	1993 Essen	Team foil
Silver medal – second place	1990 Lyon	Team foil
Bronze medal – third place	1995 The Hague	Team foil
Bronze medal – third place	1998 La Chaux-de-Fonds	Team foil
Summer Universiade
Bronze medal – third place	1991 Sheffield	Team foil
Bronze medal – third place	1995 Fukuoka	Individual foil

Ryszard Tadeusz Sobczak (born 2 November 1967) is a Polish fencer. He won a bronze medal in the team foil event at the 1992 Summer Olympics and a silver in the same event at the 1996 Summer Olympics.
