= Joachim Wendt =

Austrian fencer (born 1962)

Personal information
- Nationality: Austrian
- Born: 18 December 1962 (age 63) Spittal an der Drau, Kärnten, Austria

Sport
- Sport: Fencing

Joachim Wendt (born 18 December 1962) is an Austrian fencer. He competed at five consecutive Summer Olympics between 1984 and 2000.

Events Joachim Wendt Participated In
Event	Discipline	Pos	Date	Season
World Championships	Men's Foil	31	1 November 1999	1999
World Championships	Men's Foil	17	4 October 1998	1998
World Championships	Men's Foil	8	13 July 1997	1997
Olympic Games	Men's Foil	4	26 July 1996	1996
World Championships	Men's Foil	8	18 July 1995	1995
World Championships	Men's Foil	20	3 July 1994	1994
World Championships	Men's Foil teams	3	1 July 1993	1993
World Championships	Men's Foil	10	1 July 1993	1993
Olympic Games	Men's Foil	8	31 July 1992	1992
World Championships	Men's Foil	5	8 July 1990	1990
World Championships	Men's Foil	4	5 July 1989	1989
World Championships	Men's Foil	14	16 July 1989	1987
World Championships	Men's Foil	74	25 July 1986	1986
Olympic Games	Men's Foil teams	4	5 August 1984	1984

== See also ==
- List of athletes with the most appearances at Olympic Games
