= Hermenegildo García (fencer) =

Cuban fencer (born 1968)

Personal information
- Born: 11 September 1968 (age 57)

Sport
- Sport: Fencing
Medal record
Men's fencing
Representing Cuba
Olympic Games
| Silver medal – second place | 1992 Barcelona | Foil, team |

Hermenegildo García (born 11 September 1968) is a Cuban fencer. He won a silver medal in the team foil event at the 1992 Summer Olympics.
