= Adam Krzesiński =

Polish fencer (born 1965)

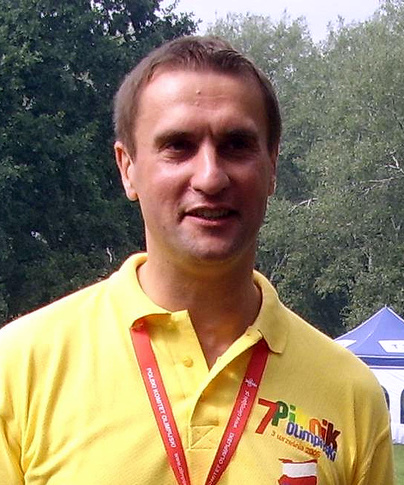

Personal information
- Full name: Adam Artur Krzesiński
- Born: 13 September 1965 (age 60) Warsaw, Poland
Medal record
Men's fencing
Representing Poland
Olympic Games
Silver medal – second place	1996 Atlanta	Foil, team
Bronze medal – third place	1992 Barcelona	Foil, team

Adam Artur Krzesiński (born 13 September 1965) is a Polish fencer. He won a bronze medal in the team foil event at the 1992 Summer Olympics and a silver in the same event at the 1996 Summer Olympics.

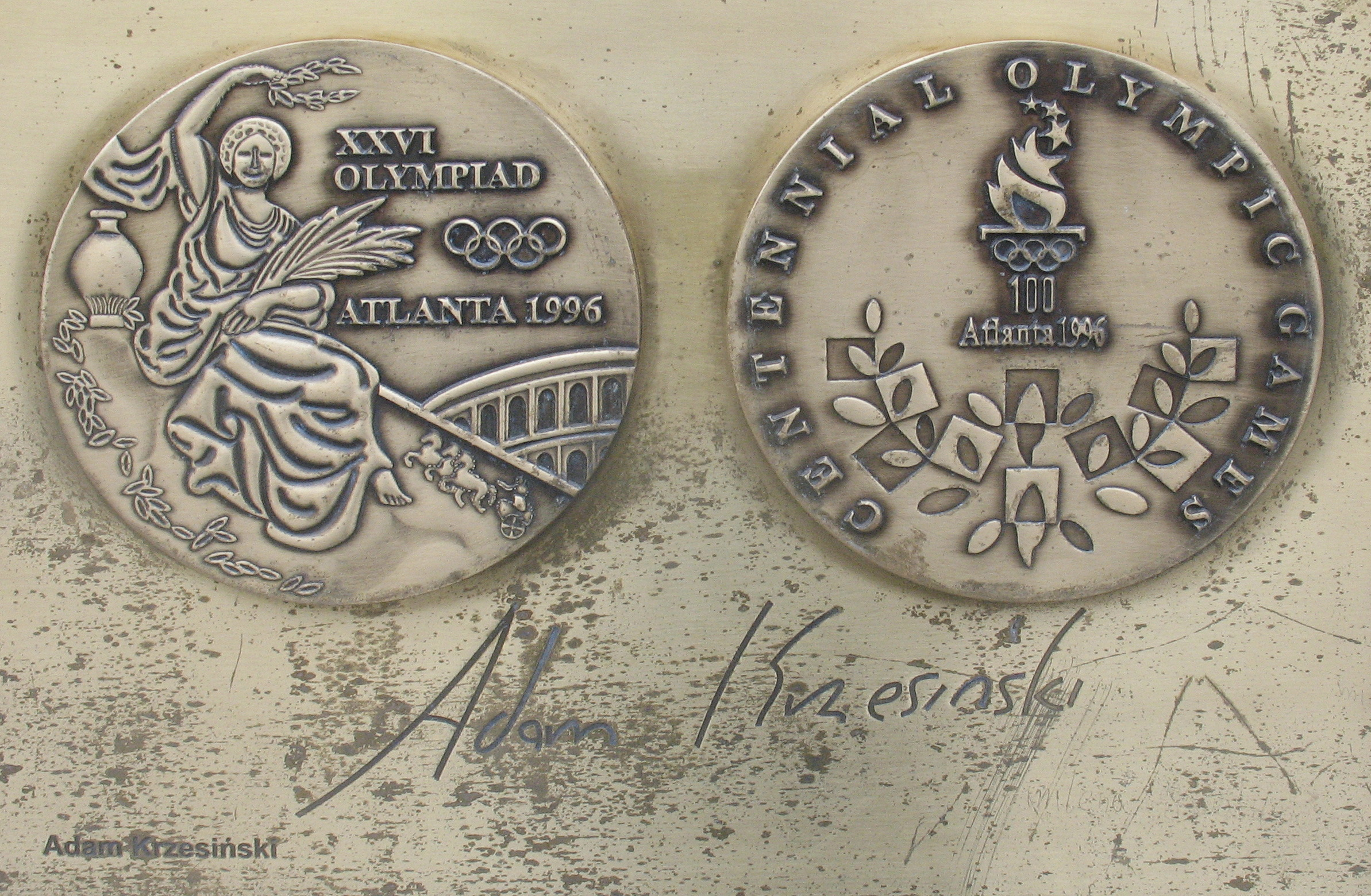
Copy of A. Krzesinski medal and autograph in Sports Stars Avenue in Dziwnów
