= Michael Ludwig (fencer) =

Austrian fencer

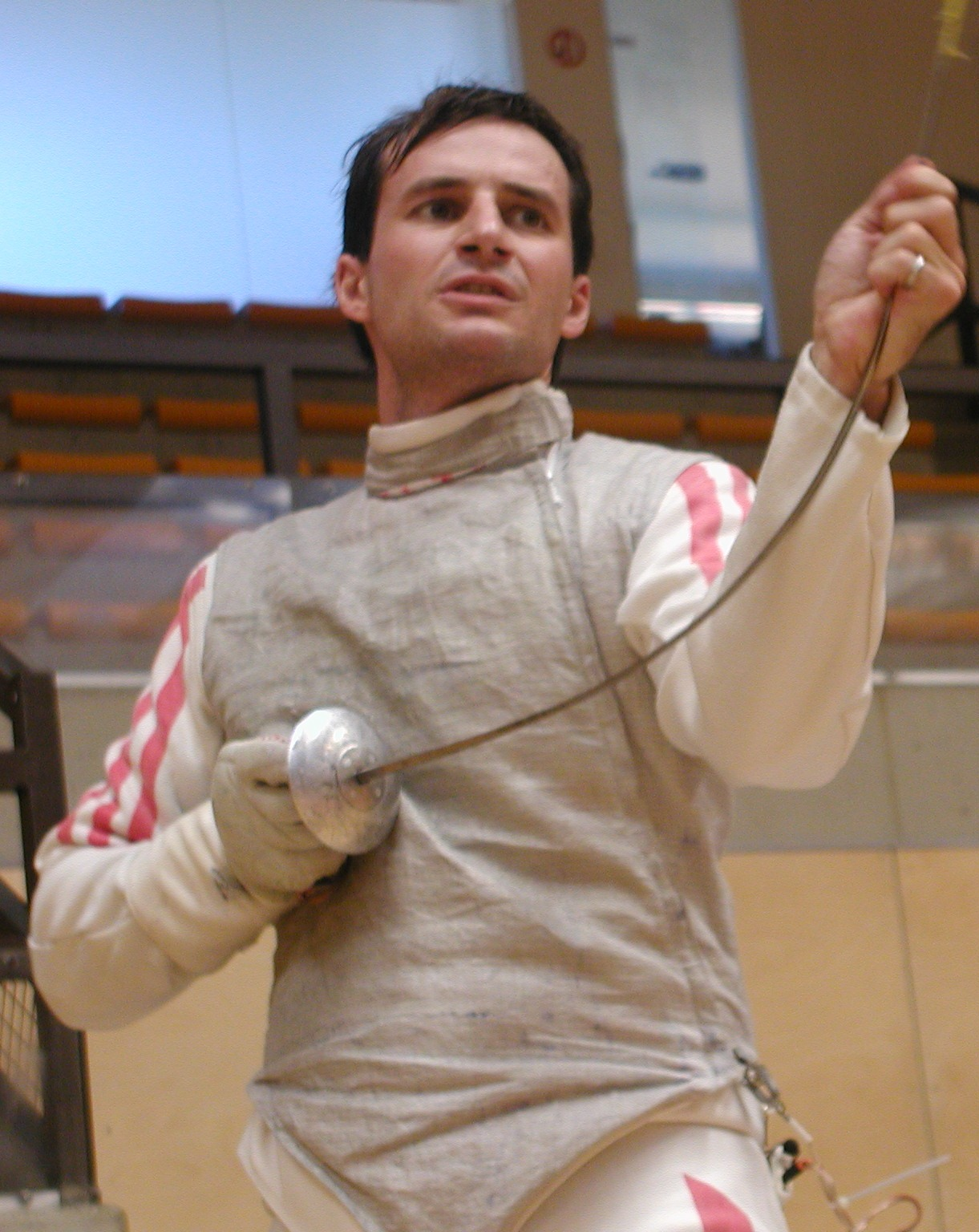

Personal information
- Born: 19 December 1972 (age 53) Vienna, Austria

Sport
- Sport: Fencing
Medal record
Representing Austria
Summer Universiade
Silver medal – second place	1999 Palma de Mallorca	Individual foil

Michael Ludwig (born 19 December 1972) is an Austrian fencer. He competed in the foil events at the 1992, 1996 and 2000 Summer Olympics. Ludwig was awarded the Silver Decoration of Honour for Services to the Republic of Austria in 1997.
