= Róbert Kiss =

Hungarian fencer

Personal information
- Born: 6 February 1967 (age 59) Budapest, Hungary

Sport
- Sport: Fencing

Róbert Kiss (born 6 February 1967) is a Hungarian foil fencer. He competed in the individual and team foil events at the 1992 and 1996 Summer Olympics.
