= Fencing at the 2004 Summer Olympics – Men's foil =

Men's foil at the Games of the XXVIII Olympiad
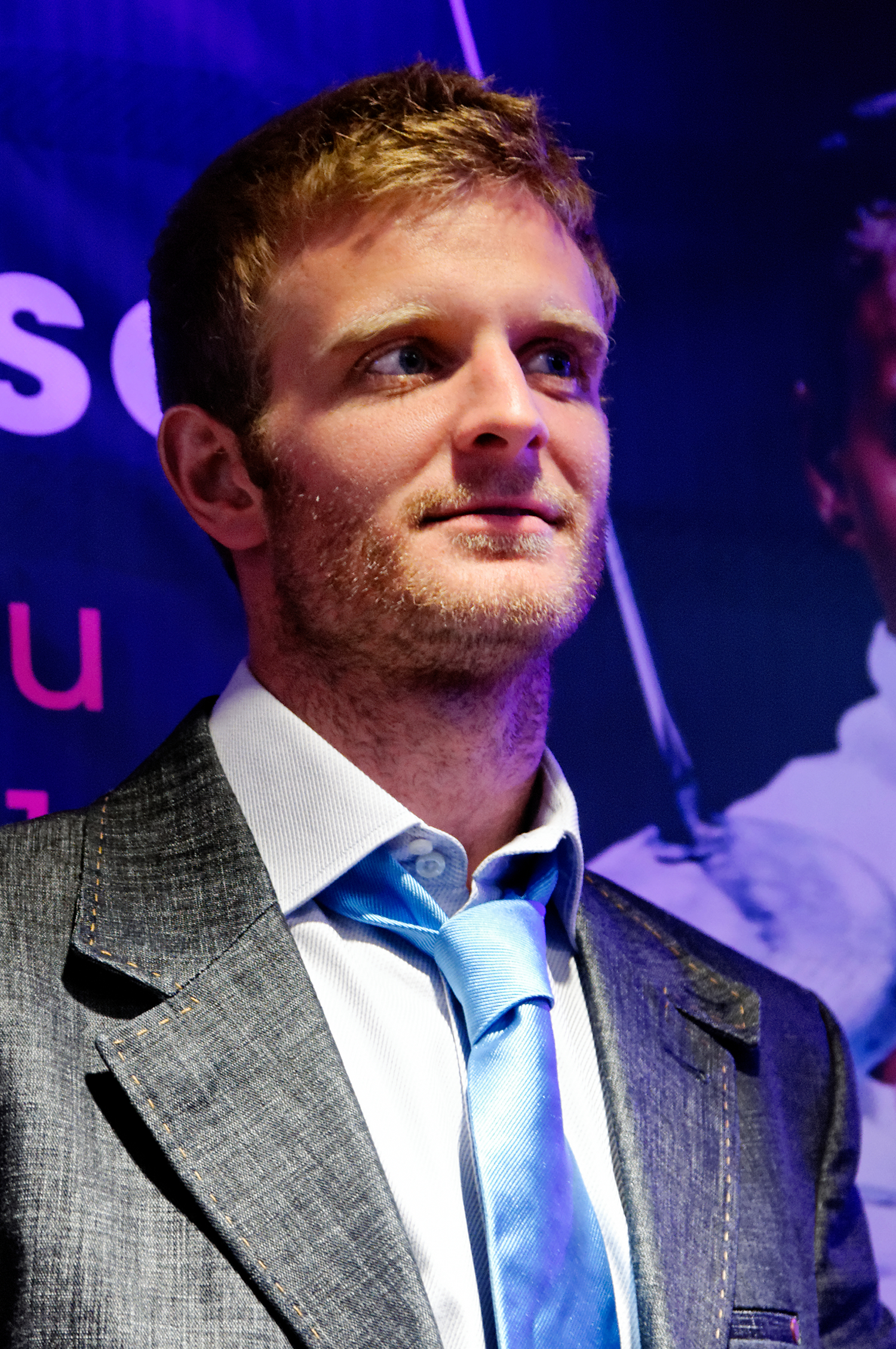
- Brice Guyart (2012)
- Venue: Helliniko Olympic Complex
- Date: August 16, 2004
- Competitors: 36 from 20 nations

Medalists
1st place, gold medalist(s)		Brice Guyart	France
2nd place, silver medalist(s)		Salvatore Sanzo	Italy
3rd place, bronze medalist(s)		Andrea Cassarà	Italy

The men's foil was a competition in fencing at the 2004 Summer Olympics in Athens. A total of 36 men from 20 nations competed in this event. Nations had been limited to three fencers each since 1928. Competition took place in the Fencing Hall at the Helliniko Olympic Complex on August 16. The event was won by Brice Guyart of France, the nation's ninth victory in the men's foil (surpassing Italy for most all-time). Italy took the other two medals, with Salvatore Sanzo earning silver and Andrea Cassarà winning the bronze medal match.

== Background ==
This was the 24th appearance of the event, which has been held at every Summer Olympics except 1908 (when there was a foil display only rather than a medal event). Two of the eight quarterfinalists from 2000 returned: silver medalist Ralf Bißdorf of Germany and fifth-place finisher Salvatore Sanzo of Italy. Sanzo had won the 2001 world championship, and his teammate Simone Vanni the 2002 title. The reigning (2003) world champion was Peter Joppich of Germany.

For the second consecutive Games, no nations made their debut in the men's foil. France and the United States each made their 22nd appearance, tied for most of any nation; France had missed only the 1904 (with fencers not traveling to St. Louis) and the 1912 (boycotted due to a dispute over rules) foil competitions, while the United States had missed the inaugural 1896 competition and boycotted the 1980 Games altogether.

== Competition format ==
The 1996 tournament had vastly simplified the competition format into a single-elimination bracket, with a bronze medal match. The 2004 tournament continued to use that format. Bouts were to 15 touches. Standard foil rules regarding target area, striking, and priority were used.

== Schedule ==
All times are Greece Standard Time (UTC+2)

Date	Time	Round
Monday, 16 August 2004	10:00; 10:30; 12:30; 13:40; 18:30; 19:30	Preliminary round Round of 32; Round of 16; Quarterfinals; Semifinals; Final; Bronze medal match

== Results ==
=== Preliminary round ===
As there were more than 32 entrants in this event, four first round matches were held to reduce the field to 32 fencers.

Tiomkin (USA)	15–10	Ben Aziza (TUN)
El Azizi (ALG)	15–14	Dupree (USA)
McGuire (CAN)	15–14	Lau (HKG)
Rodríguez (VEN)	15–7	Anwar (EGY)

=== Main tournament bracket ===
The remaining field of 32 fencers competed in a single-elimination tournament to determine the medal winners. Semifinal losers proceeded to a bronze medal match.

Round of 32
Guyart (FRA)	15
El Azizi (ALG)	3
Attely (FRA)	15
Schlosser (AUT)	14
Joppich (GER)	15
Nagaty (EGY)	10
Choi (KOR)	15
Nasibulin (RUS)	12
Cassarà (ITA)	15
Tiomkin (USA)	3
Park (KOR)	15
Weßels (GER)	13
Kruse (GBR)	15
Wang (CHN)	11
Kellner (USA)	15
Gohy (BEL)	12
Sanzo (ITA)	15
Rodríguez (VEN)	7
Ha (KOR)	15
Moltchan (RUS)	13
Wu (CHN)	15
Bartolillo (AUS)	8
Tahoun (EGY)	15
Gomes (POR)	14
Ganeev (RUS)	15
Bißdorf (GER)	11
Ota (JPN)	15
Chumacero (MEX)	9
Vanni (ITA)	15
McGuire (CAN)	12
Le Péchoux (FRA)	15
Dong (CHN)	9

Round of 16
Guyart (FRA)	15
Attelly (FRA)	4
Joppich (GER)	15
Choi (KOR)	10
Cassarà (ITA)	15
Park (KOR)	13
Kruse (GBR)	15
Kellner (USA)	14
Sanzo (ITA)	15
Ha (KOR)	6
Wu (CHN)	15
Tahoun (EGY)	8
Ganeev (RUS)	15
Ota (JPN)	8
Vanni (ITA)	15
Le Péchoux (FRA)	8

Quarterfinals
Guyart (FRA)	15
Joppich (GER)	12
Cassarà (ITA)	15
Kruse (GBR)	8
Sanzo (ITA)	15
Wu (CHN)	10
Ganeev (RUS)	15
Vanni (ITA)	14

Semifinals
Guyart (FRA)	15
Cassarà (ITA)	14
Sanzo (ITA)	15
Ganeev (RUS)	12

Gold medal final
Guyart (FRA)	15
Sanzo (ITA)	13
Bronze medal final
Cassarà (ITA)	15
Ganeev (RUS)	12

== Final classification ==
Rank	Fencer	Nation
1st place, gold medalist(s)	Brice Guyart	France
2nd place, silver medalist(s)	Salvatore Sanzo	Italy
3rd place, bronze medalist(s)	Andrea Cassarà	Italy
4	Renal Ganeyev	Russia
5	Simone Vanni	Italy
6	Peter Joppich	Germany
7	Wu Hanxiong	China
8	Richard Kruse	Great Britain
9	Yuki Ota	Japan
10	Ha Chang-Deok	South Korea
11	Park Hui-Gyeong	South Korea
12	Loïc Attely	France
13	Erwann Le Péchoux	France
14	Choi Byeong-Cheol	South Korea
15	Tamer Mohamed Tahoun	Egypt
16	Dan Kellner	United States
17	Ralf Bißdorf	Germany
18	Cédric Gohy	Belgium
19	Wang Haibin	China
20	João Gomes	Portugal
21	Ruslan Nasibulin	Russia
22	Dong Zhaozhi	China
23	Roland Schlosser	Austria
24	André Weßels	Germany
25	Yury Molchan	Russia
26	Edgar Chumacero	Mexico
27	Frank Bartolillo	Australia
28	Mostafa Nagaty	Egypt
29	Josh McGuire	Canada
30	Jon Tiomkin	United States
31	Carlos Rodríguez	Venezuela
32	Sofiane El-Azizi	Algeria
33	Jed Dupree	United States
34	Mostafa Anwar	Egypt
35	Maher Ben Aziza	Tunisia
36	Lau Kwok Kin	Hong Kong
