= Fencing at the 2004 Summer Olympics – Men's team foil =

Men's team foil at the Games of the XXVIII Olympiad
- Venue: Helliniko Olympic Complex
- Date: August 21, 2004

Medalists
1st place, gold medalist(s)		Andrea Cassarà; Salvatore Sanzo; Simone Vanni	Italy
2nd place, silver medalist(s)		Dong Zhaozhi; Wang Haibin; Wu Hanxiong; Ye Chong	China
3rd place, bronze medalist(s)		Renal Ganeev; Youri Moltchan; Rouslan Nassiboulline; Vyacheslav Pozdnyakov	Russia

These are the results of the men's foil team competition in fencing at the 2004 Summer Olympics in Athens. A total of 30 men from eight nations competed in this event. Competition took place in the Fencing Hall at the Helliniko Olympic Complex on August 21.

== Tournament results ==
The team competition was a single-elimination tournament among the eight teams. Quarterfinal losers continued to play classification matches to determine final placement from first to eighth. Each team match consisted of a set of nine individual matches, comprising a full round-robin schedule among the three fencers on each team.

=== Brackets ===
Quarterfinals
10:00
Italy	45
Egypt	20
10:00
Russia	45
France	38
10:00
China	45
South Korea	36
10:00
United States	45
Germany	43

Semifinals
11:25
Italy	45
Russia	27
11:25
China	45
United States	35

Gold medal final
19:50
Italy	45
China	42
Bronze medal final
18:30
Russia	45
United States	38

Classification matches
11:25
France	45
Egypt	32
11:25
Germany	45
South Korea	40

Fifth place match
12:50
France	45
Germany	38
Seventh place match
12:50
South Korea	45
Egypt	35

=== Quarterfinals ===
Italy	45 – 20	Egypt
Salvatore Sanzo	5 – 1	Mostafa Nagaty
Simone Vanni	5 – 1	Tamer Mohamed Tahoun
Andrea Cassarà	5 – 0	Mostafa Anwar
Simone Vanni	5 – 4	Mostafa Nagaty
Salvatore Sanzo	5 – 2	Mostafa Anwar
Andrea Cassarà	5 – 4	Tamer Mohamed Tahoun
Simone Vanni	5 – 4	Mostafa Anwar
Andrea Cassarà	5 – 0	Mostafa Nagaty
Salvatore Sanzo	5 – 4	Tamer Mohamed Tahoun

Russia	45 – 38	France
Youri Moltchan	2 – 5	Loïc Attely
Ruslan Nasibulin	2 – 5	Brice Guyart
Renal Ganeev	3 – 3	Erwann Le Péchoux
Ruslan Nasibulin	4 – 6	Erwann Le Péchoux
Youri Moltchan	12 – 6	Loïc Attely
Renal Ganeev	7 – 2	Brice Guyart
Ruslan Nasibulin	2 – 5	Erwann Le Péchoux
Renal Ganeev	8 – 5	Loïc Attely
Youri Moltchan	5 – 1	Brice Guyart

China	45 – 36	South Korea
Dong Zhaozhi	5 – 4	Ha Chang-duk
Wang Haibin	5 – 1	Park Hee-kyung
Wu Hanxiong	2 – 3	Choi Byung-chul
Dong Zhaozhi	4 – 4	Park Hee-kyung
Wu Hanxiong	9 – 4	Ha Chang-duk
Wang Haibin	4 – 8	Choi Byung-chul
Wu Hanxiong	6 – 4	Park Hee-kyung
Dong Zhaozhi	3 – 3	Choi Byung-chul
Wang Haibin	7 – 5	Ha Chang-duk

United States	45 – 43	Germany
Dan Kellner	5 – 2	Peter Joppich
Jonathan Tiomkin	5 – 6	André Weßels
Jedediah Dupree	5 – 2	Ralf Bißdorf
Jonathan Tiomkin	5 – 1	Peter Joppich
Dan Kellner	5 – 8	Ralf Bißdorf
Jedediah Dupree	5 – 3	André Weßels
Jonathan Tiomkin	5 – 4	Ralf Bißdorf
Jedediah Dupree	4 – 14	Peter Joppich
Dan Kellner	6 – 3	André Weßels

=== Semifinals ===
Italy	45 – 27	Russia
Andrea Cassarà	5 – 2	Youri Moltchan
Salvatore Sanzo	4 – 8	Renal Ganeev
Simone Vanni	6 – 2	Ruslan Nasibulin
Andrea Cassarà	5 – 4	Renal Ganeev
Simone Vanni	5 – 0	Youri Moltchan
Salvatore Sanzo	5 – 3	Vyacheslav Pozdnyakov
Simone Vanni	5 – 3	Renal Ganeev
Andrea Cassarà	5 – 3	Vyacheslav Pozdnyakov
Salvatore Sanzo	5 – 2	Youri Moltchan

China	45 – 35	United States
Dong Zhaozhi	5 – 3	Dan Kellner
Wang Haibin	3 – 7	Jonathan Tiomkin
Wu Hanxiong	7 – 4	Jedediah Dupree
Dong Zhaozhi	5 – 3	Jonathan Tiomkin
Wu Hanxiong	5 – 4	Dan Kellner
Wang Haibin	5 – 4	Jedediah Dupree
Wu Hanxiong	5 – 7	Jonathan Tiomkin
Dong Zhaozhi	5 – 0	Jedediah Dupree
Wang Haibin	5 – 3	Dan Kellner

=== Classification matches ===
France	45 – 32	Egypt
Loïc Attely	5 – 2	Mostafa Nagaty
Jean-Noël Ferrari	5 – 5	Tamer Mohamed Tahoun
Brice Guyart	5 – 6	Tarek Madgy
Jean-Noël Ferrari	5 – 1	Mostafa Nagaty
Loïc Attely	5 – 1	Tarek Madgy
Brice Guyart	5 – 7	Tamer Mohamed Tahoun
Jean-Noël Ferrari	5 – 1	Tarek Madgy
Brice Guyart	5 – 5	Mostafa Nagaty
Loïc Attely	5 – 4	Tamer Mohamed Tahoun

Germany	45 – 40	South Korea
Ralf Bißdorf	3 – 5	Choi Byung-chul
Peter Joppich	7 – 2	Park Hee-kyung
André Weßels	5 – 6	Ha Chang-duk
Ralf Bißdorf	5 – 4	Park Hee-kyung
André Weßels	5 – 2	Choi Byung-chul
Peter Joppich	5 – 5	Ha Chang-duk
André Weßels	5 – 0	Park Hee-kyung
Ralf Bißdorf	5 – 12	Ha Chang-duk
Peter Joppich	5 – 4	Choi Byung-chul

=== Seventh place match ===
South Korea	45 – 35	Egypt
Choi Byung-chul	5 – 3	Mostafa Nagaty
Ha Chang-duk	5 – 4	Tamer Mohamed Tahoun
Kim Woon-Sung	5 – 1	Tarek Madgy
Ha Chang-duk	5 – 5	Mostafa Nagaty
Choi Byung-chul	5 – 4	Tarek Madgy
Kim Woon-Sung	5 – 3	Tamer Mohamed Tahoun
Ha Chang-duk	5 – 3	Tarek Madgy
Kim Woon-Sung	5 – 3	Mostafa Nagaty
Choi Byung-chul	5 – 9	Tamer Mohamed Tahoun

=== Fifth place match ===
France	45 – 38	Germany
Loïc Attely	5 – 2	André Weßels
Jean-Noël Ferrari	5 – 1	Peter Joppich
Brice Guyart	5 – 4	Simon Senft
Jean-Noël Ferrari	5 – 8	André Weßels
Loïc Attely	5 – 3	Simon Senft
Brice Guyart	5 – 4	Peter Joppich
Jean-Noël Ferrari	5 – 7	Simon Senft
Brice Guyart	5 – 4	André Weßels
Loïc Attely	5 – 5	Peter Joppich

=== Bronze medal match ===
Russia	45 – 38	United States
Renal Ganeev	4 – 5	Dan Kellner
Youri Moltchan	4 – 5	Jonathan Tiomkin
Vyacheslav Pozdnyakov	7 – 3	Jedediah Dupree
Renal Ganeev	4 – 7	Jonathan Tiomkin
Vyacheslav Pozdnyakov	6 – 4	Dan Kellner
Youri Moltchan	5 – 5	Jedediah Dupree
Vyacheslav Pozdnyakov	5 – 3	Jonathan Tiomkin
Renal Ganeev	5 – 5	Jedediah Dupree
Youri Moltchan	5 – 1	Dan Kellner

=== Gold medal match ===
Italy	45 – 42	China
Salvatore Sanzo	2 – 5	Ye Chong
Simone Vanni	8 – 2	Dong Zhaozhi
Andrea Cassarà	3 – 8	Wu Hanxiong
Simone Vanni	7 – 3	Ye Chong
Salvatore Sanzo	5 – 2	Wu Hanxiong
Andrea Cassarà	5 – 3	Dong Zhaozhi
Simone Vanni	5 – 7	Wu Hanxiong
Andrea Cassarà	5 – 4	Ye Chong
Salvatore Sanzo	5 – 8	Dong Zhaozhi
