= Fencing at the 2006 Asian Games – Men's team foil =

Men's team foil at the 2006 Asian Games
- Venue: Al-Arabi Indoor Hall
- Date: 12 December 2006
- Competitors: 37 from 10 nations

Medalists
gold medal	China; Lei Sheng, Wu Hanxiong, Zhang Liangliang, Zhu Jun
silver medal	South Korea; Cha Hyung-woo, Choi Byung-chul, Ha Chang-duk, Lee Cheon-woong
bronze medal	Hong Kong; Cheung Kai Tung, Lau Kwok Kin, Kevin Ngan, Wong Kam Kau
bronze medal	Japan; Kenta Chida, Yusuke Fukuda, Yuki Ota

The men's team foil competition at the 2006 Asian Games in Doha was held on 12 December at the Al-Arabi Indoor Hall.

== Schedule ==
All times are Arabia Standard Time (UTC+03:00)

Date	Time	Event
Tuesday, 12 December 2006	11:10	Round of 16
Tuesday, 12 December 2006	12:35	Quarterfinals
Tuesday, 12 December 2006	14:00	Semifinals
Tuesday, 12 December 2006	19:00	Gold medal match

== Seeding ==
The teams were seeded taking into account the results achieved by competitors representing each team in the individual event.

Rank	Team	Fencer		Total
Rank	Team	1	2	Total
1	China (CHN)	3	3	6
2	Japan (JPN)	1	6	7
3	South Korea (KOR)	2	8	10
4	Iran (IRI)	7	14	21
5	Hong Kong (HKG)	10	13	23
6	Uzbekistan (UZB)	12	17	29
7	Philippines (PHI)	11	19	30
8	Qatar (QAT)	9	23	32
9	Kuwait (KUW)	15	20	35
10	Iraq (IRQ)	22	25	47

== Results ==
Round of 16
9	Kuwait	45
8	Qatar	29
7	Philippines	45
10	Iraq	41

Quarterfinals
1	China	45
9	Kuwait	16
5	Hong Kong	45
4	Iran	30
3	South Korea	45
6	Uzbekistan	34
7	Philippines	23
2	Japan	45

Semifinals
1	China	45
5	Hong Kong	28
3	South Korea	45
2	Japan	40

Gold medal match
1	China	34
3	South Korea	29

== Final standing ==
Rank	Team
1st place, gold medalist(s)	China (CHN); Lei Sheng; Wu Hanxiong; Zhang Liangliang; Zhu Jun
2nd place, silver medalist(s)	South Korea (KOR); Cha Hyung-woo; Choi Byung-chul; Ha Chang-duk; Lee Cheon-woong
3rd place, bronze medalist(s)	Hong Kong (HKG); Cheung Kai Tung; Lau Kwok Kin; Kevin Ngan; Wong Kam Kau
3rd place, bronze medalist(s)	Japan (JPN); Kenta Chida; Yusuke Fukuda; Yuki Ota
5	Iran (IRI); Siamak Feiz-Asgari; Javad Rezaei; Mohammad Rezaei; Hamed Sayyad Ghanbari
6	Uzbekistan (UZB); Iskander Bashirov; Rustam Dostmuhamedov; Ruslan Kudayev
7	Philippines (PHI); Rolando Canlas; Ramil Endriano; Emerson Segui
8	Kuwait (KUW); Imad Abdulkarim; Ahmad Al-Daikan; Ali Khasrouh; Abdullah Najem
9	Qatar (QAT); Khalid Al-Hammadi; Abdullah Ebrahimi; Hamad Saad Salem; Amir Shabakehsaz
10	Iraq (IRQ); Ahmed Kadhim; Haidar Mohammed; Ali Salih; Saad Salih
