= Fencing at the 2010 Asian Games – Men's team foil =

Men's team foil at the 2010 Asian Games
- Venue: Guangda Gymnasium
- Date: 23 November 2010
- Competitors: 37 from 10 nations

Medalists
gold medal	China; Huang Liangcai, Lei Sheng, Zhang Liangliang, Zhu Jun
silver medal	Japan; Suguru Awaji, Kenta Chida, Yusuke Fukuda, Yuki Ota
bronze medal	South Korea; Choi Byung-chul, Ha Tae-gyu, Heo Jun, Kwon Young-ho
bronze medal	Hong Kong; Cheung Siu Lun, Chu Wing Hong, Lau Kwok Kin, Kevin Ngan

The men's team foil competition at the 2010 Asian Games in Guangzhou was held on 23 November at the Guangda Gymnasium.

== Schedule ==
All times are China Standard Time (UTC+08:00)

Date	Time	Event
Tuesday, 23 November 2010	09:00	Round of 16
Tuesday, 23 November 2010	10:30	Quarterfinals
Tuesday, 23 November 2010	12:00	Semifinals
Tuesday, 23 November 2010	18:00	Gold medal match

== Seeding ==
The teams were seeded taking into account the results achieved by competitors representing each team in the individual event.

Rank	Team	Fencer		Total
Rank	Team	1	2	Total
1	South Korea (KOR)	1	7	8
2	China (CHN)	3	5	8
3	Hong Kong (HKG)	2	8	10
4	Japan (JPN)	3	9	12
5	Thailand (THA)	6	15	21
6	Athletes from Kuwait (IOC)	10	14	24
7	Iran (IRI)	12	19	31
8	Saudi Arabia (KSA)	22	23	45
9	United Arab Emirates (UAE)	21	25	46
10	India (IND)	24	27	51

== Results ==
Round of 16
9	United Arab Emirates	39
8	Saudi Arabia	45
7	Iran	45
10	India	20

Quarterfinals
1	South Korea	45
8	Saudi Arabia	17
5	Thailand	27
4	Japan	45
3	Hong Kong	45
6	Athletes from Kuwait	27
7	Iran	22
2	China	45

Semifinals
1	South Korea	36
4	Japan	45
3	Hong Kong	21
2	China	45

Gold medal match
4	Japan	35
2	China	45

== Final standing ==
Rank	Team
1st place, gold medalist(s)	China (CHN); Huang Liangcai; Lei Sheng; Zhang Liangliang; Zhu Jun
2nd place, silver medalist(s)	Japan (JPN); Suguru Awaji; Kenta Chida; Yusuke Fukuda; Yuki Ota
3rd place, bronze medalist(s)	South Korea (KOR); Choi Byung-chul; Ha Tae-gyu; Heo Jun; Kwon Young-ho
3rd place, bronze medalist(s)	Hong Kong (HKG); Cheung Siu Lun; Chu Wing Hong; Lau Kwok Kin; Kevin Ngan
5	Thailand (THA); Satabun Nootprapai; Nontapat Panchan; Phatthanapong Srisawat; Suppakorn Sritangorn
6	Athletes from Kuwait (IOC); Imad Abdulkarim; Abdulrahman Al-Arbeed; Nasser Al-Waleed
7	Iran (IRI); Javad Rezaei; Mohammad Rezaei; Hamed Sayyad Ghanbari; Shervin Tolouei
8	Saudi Arabia (KSA); Eisa Al-Muqabqab; Talal Al-Shammari; Mohammed Hazazi; Yahya Hazazi
9	United Arab Emirates (UAE); Abdullah Al-Hammadi; Ali Al-Mansoori; Majed Al-Mansoori
10	India (IND); Vijay Kumar; Tukaram Mehatra; Rajeshor Singh
