= Fencing at the 2006 Asian Games – Men's individual foil =

Men's individual foil at the 2006 Asian Games
- Venue: Al-Arabi Indoor Hall
- Date: 9 December 2006
- Competitors: 26 from 14 nations

Medalists
gold medal	Yuki Ota	Japan
silver medal	Lee Cheon-woong	South Korea
bronze medal	Zhang Liangliang	China
bronze medal	Lei Sheng	China

The men's individual foil competition at the 2006 Asian Games in Doha was held on 9 December at the Al-Arabi Indoor Hall.

== Schedule ==
All times are Arabia Standard Time (UTC+03:00)

Date	Time	Event
Saturday, 9 December 2006	12:00	Round of pools
Saturday, 9 December 2006	14:00	Round of 32
Saturday, 9 December 2006	14:55	Round of 16
Saturday, 9 December 2006	15:50	Quarterfinals
Saturday, 9 December 2006	18:30	Semifinals
Saturday, 9 December 2006	19:25	Gold medal match

== Results ==
Legend

- DNS — Did not start

=== Round of pools ===
==== Pool 1 ====
Athlete	CHN	THA	HKG	IRI	UZB	IRQ	QAT
Lei Sheng (CHN)	—	5–4	5–2	5–3	4–5	5–0	5–3
Nontapat Panchan (THA)	4–5	—	5–2	5–4	5–1	5–3	5–2
Kevin Ngan (HKG)	2–5	2–5	—	5–2	5–2	5–1	5–2
Hamed Sayyad Ghanbari (IRI)	3–5	4–5	2–5	—	5–4	5–3	5–4
Rustam Dostmuhamedov (UZB)	5–4	1–5	2–5	4–5	—	5–3	5–4
Ahmed Kadhim (IRQ)	0–5	3–5	1–5	3–5	3–5	—	5–4
Khalid Al-Hammadi (QAT)	3–5	2–5	2–5	4–5	4–5	4–5	—

==== Pool 2 ====
Athlete	CHN	HKG	THA	MAC	KUW	PHI	AFG
Zhang Liangliang (CHN)	—	5–1	5–1	5–0	5–3	4–2	—
Lau Kwok Kin (HKG)	1–5	—	4–5	4–3	5–3	5–2	—
Phatthanaphong Srisawat (THA)	1–5	5–4	—	5–1	1–5	3–5	—
Wong Soi Cheong (MAC)	0–5	3–4	1–5	—	5–1	5–3	—
Ahmad Al-Daikan (KUW)	3–5	3–5	5–1	1–5	—	5–1	—
Ramil Endriano (PHI)	2–4	2–5	5–3	3–5	1–5	—	—
Farooq Muzammil (AFG)	—	—	—	—	—	—	—

==== Pool 3 ====
Athlete	JPN	KOR	QAT	PHI	MAC	LIB
Yusuke Fukuda (JPN)	—	5–2	5–4	4–5	5–1	5–2
Lee Cheon-woong (KOR)	2–5	—	3–5	5–3	5–2	5–0
Amir Shabakehsaz (QAT)	4–5	5–3	—	5–3	5–0	5–3
Emerson Segui (PHI)	5–4	3–5	3–5	—	5–2	5–0
Ho Long Tin (MAC)	1–5	2–5	0–5	2–5	—	5–4
Fady Tannous (LIB)	2–5	0–5	3–5	0–5	4–5	—

==== Pool 4 ====
Athlete	JPN	KOR	UZB	IRI	KUW	IRQ
Yuki Ota (JPN)	—	5–2	5–2	4–5	5–2	5–0
Ha Chang-duk (KOR)	2–5	—	5–4	4–5	5–1	5–0
Ruslan Kudayev (UZB)	2–5	4–5	—	5–2	5–4	5–2
Javad Rezaei (IRI)	5–4	5–4	2–5	—	5–2	4–1
Abdullah Najem (KUW)	2–5	1–5	4–5	2–5	—	3–1
Ali Salih (IRQ)	0–5	0–5	2–5	1–4	1–3	—

==== Summary ====
Rank	Pool	Athlete	W	L	W/M	TD	TF
1	2	Zhang Liangliang (CHN)	5	0	1.000	+17	24
2	1	Lei Sheng (CHN)	5	1	0.833	+12	29
2	1	Nontapat Panchan (THA)	5	1	0.833	+12	29
4	4	Yuki Ota (JPN)	4	1	0.800	+13	24
5	3	Yusuke Fukuda (JPN)	4	1	0.800	+10	24
5	3	Amir Shabakehsaz (QAT)	4	1	0.800	+10	24
7	4	Javad Rezaei (IRI)	4	1	0.800	+5	21
8	1	Kevin Ngan (HKG)	4	2	0.667	+7	24
9	4	Ha Chang-duk (KOR)	3	2	0.600	+6	21
10	3	Emerson Segui (PHI)	3	2	0.600	+5	21
11	3	Lee Cheon-woong (KOR)	3	2	0.600	+5	20
12	4	Ruslan Kudayev (UZB)	3	2	0.600	+3	21
13	2	Lau Kwok Kin (HKG)	3	2	0.600	+1	19
14	1	Hamed Sayyad Ghanbari (IRI)	3	3	0.500	−2	24
15	1	Rustam Dostmuhamedov (UZB)	3	3	0.500	−4	22
16	2	Ahmad Al-Daikan (KUW)	2	3	0.400	0	17
17	2	Wong Soi Cheong (MAC)	2	3	0.400	−4	14
18	2	Phatthanaphong Srisawat (THA)	2	3	0.400	−5	15
19	2	Ramil Endriano (PHI)	1	4	0.200	−9	13
20	4	Abdullah Najem (KUW)	1	4	0.200	−9	12
21	3	Ho Long Tin (MAC)	1	4	0.200	−14	10
22	1	Ahmed Kadhim (IRQ)	1	5	0.167	−14	15
23	1	Khalid Al-Hammadi (QAT)	0	6	0.000	−11	19
24	3	Fady Tannous (LIB)	0	5	0.000	−16	9
25	4	Ali Salih (IRQ)	0	5	0.000	−18	4
—	2	Farooq Muzammil (AFG)			DNS		

=== Knockout round ===
==== Final ====
Gold medal match
4	Yuki Ota (JPN)	15
11	Lee Cheon-woong (KOR)	8

==== Top half ====
Round of 32
17	Wong Soi Cheong (MAC)	12
16	Ahmad Al-Daikan (KUW)	15
21	Ho Long Tin (MAC)	6
12	Ruslan Kudayev (UZB)	15
13	Lau Kwok Kin (HKG)	15
20	Abdullah Najem (KUW)	12

Round of 16
1	Zhang Liangliang (CHN)	15
16	Ahmad Al-Daikan (KUW)	5
9	Ha Chang-duk (KOR)	15
8	Kevin Ngan (HKG)	6
5	Yusuke Fukuda (JPN)	15
12	Ruslan Kudayev (UZB)	9
13	Lau Kwok Kin (HKG)	14
4	Yuki Ota (JPN)	15

Quarterfinals
1	Zhang Liangliang (CHN)	14
9	Ha Chang-duk (KOR)	9
5	Yusuke Fukuda (JPN)	6
4	Yuki Ota (JPN)	15

Semifinals
1	Zhang Liangliang (CHN)	10
4	Yuki Ota (JPN)	15

==== Bottom half ====
Round of 32
19	Ramil Endriano (PHI)	13
14	Hamed Sayyad Ghanbari (IRI)	15
15	Rustam Dostmuhamedov (UZB)	11
18	Phatthanaphong Srisawat (THA)	15

Round of 16
3	Nontapat Panchan (THA)	15
14	Hamed Sayyad Ghanbari (IRI)	9
11	Lee Cheon-woong (KOR)	15
6	Amir Shabakehsaz (QAT)	9
7	Javad Rezaei (IRI)	14
10	Emerson Segui (PHI)	12
18	Phatthanaphong Srisawat (THA)	4
2	Lei Sheng (CHN)	15

Quarterfinals
3	Nontapat Panchan (THA)	14
11	Lee Cheon-woong (KOR)	15
7	Javad Rezaei (IRI)	12
2	Lei Sheng (CHN)	15

Semifinals
11	Lee Cheon-woong (KOR)	14
2	Lei Sheng (CHN)	13

== Final standing ==
Rank	Athlete
1st place, gold medalist(s)	Yuki Ota (JPN)
2nd place, silver medalist(s)	Lee Cheon-woong (KOR)
3rd place, bronze medalist(s)	Zhang Liangliang (CHN)
3rd place, bronze medalist(s)	Lei Sheng (CHN)
5	Nontapat Panchan (THA)
6	Yusuke Fukuda (JPN)
7	Javad Rezaei (IRI)
8	Ha Chang-duk (KOR)
9	Amir Shabakehsaz (QAT)
10	Kevin Ngan (HKG)
11	Emerson Segui (PHI)
12	Ruslan Kudayev (UZB)
13	Lau Kwok Kin (HKG)
14	Hamed Sayyad Ghanbari (IRI)
15	Ahmad Al-Daikan (KUW)
16	Phatthanaphong Srisawat (THA)
17	Rustam Dostmuhamedov (UZB)
18	Wong Soi Cheong (MAC)
19	Ramil Endriano (PHI)
20	Abdullah Najem (KUW)
21	Ho Long Tin (MAC)
22	Ahmed Kadhim (IRQ)
23	Khalid Al-Hammadi (QAT)
24	Fady Tannous (LIB)
25	Ali Salih (IRQ)
26	Farooq Muzammil (AFG)
