= Fencing at the 2010 Asian Games – Men's individual foil =

Men's individual foil at the 2010 Asian Games
- Venue: Guangda Gymnasium
- Date: 20 November 2010
- Competitors: 27 from 16 nations

Medalists
gold medal	Choi Byung-chul	South Korea
silver medal	Cheung Siu Lun	Hong Kong
bronze medal	Yuki Ota	Japan
bronze medal	Lei Sheng	China

The men's individual foil competition at the 2010 Asian Games in Guangzhou was held on 20 November at the Guangda Gymnasium.

== Schedule ==
All times are China Standard Time (UTC+08:00)

Date	Time	Event
Saturday, 20 November 2010	09:00	Round of pools
Saturday, 20 November 2010	11:00	Round of 32
Saturday, 20 November 2010	11:35	Round of 16
Saturday, 20 November 2010	12:35	Quarterfinals
Saturday, 20 November 2010	18:00	Semifinals
Saturday, 20 November 2010	20:00	Gold medal match

== Results ==
=== Round of pools ===
==== Pool 1 ====
Athlete	CHN	HKG	THA	INA	QAT	LIB	KSA
Lei Sheng (CHN)	—	5–3	5–3	5–1	5–2	5–1	5–0
Kevin Ngan (HKG)	3–5	—	4–5	5–0	5–1	5–1	5–1
Nontapat Panchan (THA)	3–5	5–4	—	5–0	5–3	5–3	5–0
Sinatrio Raharjo (INA)	1–5	0–5	0–5	—	1–5	5–2	5–4
Abdullah Ebrahimi (QAT)	2–5	1–5	3–5	5–1	—	5–1	5–1
Fady Tannous (LIB)	1–5	1–5	3–5	2–5	1–5	—	1–5
Mohammed Hazazi (KSA)	0–5	1–5	0–5	4–5	1–5	5–1	—

==== Pool 2 ====
Athlete	JPN	HKG	MAS	IRI	IND	UAE	VIE
Yuki Ota (JPN)	—	4–5	5–1	5–4	5–1	5–3	5–1
Cheung Siu Lun (HKG)	5–4	—	5–0	5–4	5–0	5–1	5–0
Zairul Zaimi (MAS)	1–5	0–5	—	5–2	5–0	5–2	1–5
Hamed Sayyad Ghanbari (IRI)	4–5	4–5	2–5	—	5–1	5–2	4–5
Rajeshor Singh (IND)	1–5	0–5	0–5	1–5	—	5–3	3–5
Ali Al-Mansoori (UAE)	3–5	1–5	2–5	2–5	3–5	—	2–5
Bùi Văn Thái (VIE)	1–5	0–5	5–1	5–4	5–3	5–2	—

==== Pool 3 ====
Athlete	CHN	KOR	THA	IND	KSA	JOR	IOC
Zhu Jun (CHN)	—	3–5	5–1	5–1	5–0	4–1	5–1
Choi Byung-chul (KOR)	5–3	—	5–2	5–0	5–1	5–0	5–3
Phatthanapong Srisawat (THA)	1–5	2–5	—	5–0	4–1	0–5	3–5
Vijay Kumar (IND)	1–5	0–5	0–5	—	0–5	1–5	2–5
Yahya Hazazi (KSA)	0–5	1–5	1–4	5–0	—	2–5	4–5
Fahed Abu Assaf (JOR)	1–4	0–5	5–0	5–1	5–2	—	4–5
Imad Abdulkarim (IOC)	1–5	3–5	5–3	5–2	5–4	5–4	—

==== Pool 4 ====
Athlete	KOR	JPN	IRI	QAT	UAE	IOC
Kwon Young-ho (KOR)	—	5–3	5–3	5–0	5–0	4–5
Kenta Chida (JPN)	3–5	—	5–2	5–1	5–0	5–2
Javad Rezaei (IRI)	3–5	2–5	—	5–1	5–2	5–1
Abdulaziz Al-Amoodi (QAT)	0–5	1–5	1–5	—	5–3	4–5
Majed Al-Mansoori (UAE)	0–5	0–5	2–5	3–5	—	4–3
Nasser Al-Waleed (IOC)	5–4	2–5	1–5	5–4	3–4	—

==== Summary ====
Rank	Pool	Athlete	W	L	W/M	TD	TF
1	3	Choi Byung-chul (KOR)	6	0	1.000	+21	30
1	2	Cheung Siu Lun (HKG)	6	0	1.000	+21	30
3	1	Lei Sheng (CHN)	6	0	1.000	+20	30
4	3	Zhu Jun (CHN)	5	1	0.833	+18	27
5	2	Yuki Ota (JPN)	5	1	0.833	+14	29
6	1	Nontapat Panchan (THA)	5	1	0.833	+13	28
7	4	Kwon Young-ho (KOR)	4	1	0.800	+13	24
8	4	Kenta Chida (JPN)	4	1	0.800	+13	23
9	1	Kevin Ngan (HKG)	4	2	0.667	+14	27
10	3	Imad Abdulkarim (IOC)	4	2	0.667	+1	24
11	2	Bùi Văn Thái (VIE)	4	2	0.667	+1	21
12	4	Javad Rezaei (IRI)	3	2	0.600	+6	20
13	1	Abdullah Ebrahimi (QAT)	3	3	0.500	+3	21
14	3	Fahed Abu Assaf (JOR)	3	3	0.500	+3	20
15	2	Zairul Zaimi (MAS)	3	3	0.500	−2	17
16	4	Nasser Al-Waleed (IOC)	2	3	0.400	−6	16
17	2	Hamed Sayyad Ghanbari (IRI)	2	4	0.333	+1	24
18	3	Phatthanapong Srisawat (THA)	2	4	0.333	−6	15
19	1	Sinatrio Raharjo (INA)	2	4	0.333	−14	12
20	4	Abdulaziz Al-Amoodi (QAT)	1	4	0.200	−12	11
21	4	Majed Al-Mansoori (UAE)	1	4	0.200	−14	9
22	3	Yahya Hazazi (KSA)	1	5	0.167	−11	13
23	1	Mohammed Hazazi (KSA)	1	5	0.167	−15	11
24	2	Rajeshor Singh (IND)	1	5	0.167	−18	10
25	2	Ali Al-Mansoori (UAE)	0	6	0.000	−17	13
26	1	Fady Tannous (LIB)	0	6	0.000	−21	9
27	3	Vijay Kumar (IND)	0	6	0.000	−26	4

=== Knockout round ===
==== Final ====
Gold medal match
1	Choi Byung-chul (KOR)	15
2	Cheung Siu Lun (HKG)	14

==== Top half ====
Round of 32
17	Hamed Sayyad Ghanbari (IRI)	14
16	Nasser Al-Waleed (IOC)	15
21	Majed Al-Mansoori (UAE)	6
12	Javad Rezaei (IRI)	15
13	Abdullah Ebrahimi (QAT)	10
20	Abdulaziz Al-Amoodi (QAT)	15

Round of 16
1	Choi Byung-chul (KOR)	15
16	Nasser Al-Waleed (IOC)	5
9	Kevin Ngan (HKG)	15
8	Kenta Chida (JPN)	8
5	Yuki Ota (JPN)	15
12	Javad Rezaei (IRI)	8
20	Abdulaziz Al-Amoodi (QAT)	0
4	Zhu Jun (CHN)	15

Quarterfinals
1	Choi Byung-chul (KOR)	15
9	Kevin Ngan (HKG)	6
5	Yuki Ota (JPN)	15
4	Zhu Jun (CHN)	11

Semifinals
1	Choi Byung-chul (KOR)	15
5	Yuki Ota (JPN)	12

==== Bottom half ====
Round of 32
19	Sinatrio Raharjo (INA)	14
14	Fahed Abu Assaf (JOR)	15
15	Zairul Zaimi (MAS)	14
18	Phatthanapong Srisawat (THA)	15

Round of 16
3	Lei Sheng (CHN)	15
14	Fahed Abu Assaf (JOR)	6
11	Bùi Văn Thái (VIE)	3
6	Nontapat Panchan (THA)	15
7	Kwon Young-ho (KOR)	15
10	Imad Abdulkarim (IOC)	5
18	Phatthanapong Srisawat (THA)	8
2	Cheung Siu Lun (HKG)	15

Quarterfinals
3	Lei Sheng (CHN)	15
6	Nontapat Panchan (THA)	7
7	Kwon Young-ho (KOR)	7
2	Cheung Siu Lun (HKG)	15

Semifinals
3	Lei Sheng (CHN)	14
2	Cheung Siu Lun (HKG)	15

== Final standing ==
Rank	Athlete
1st place, gold medalist(s)	Choi Byung-chul (KOR)
2nd place, silver medalist(s)	Cheung Siu Lun (HKG)
3rd place, bronze medalist(s)	Yuki Ota (JPN)
3rd place, bronze medalist(s)	Lei Sheng (CHN)
5	Zhu Jun (CHN)
6	Nontapat Panchan (THA)
7	Kwon Young-ho (KOR)
8	Kevin Ngan (HKG)
9	Kenta Chida (JPN)
10	Imad Abdulkarim (IOC)
11	Bùi Văn Thái (VIE)
12	Javad Rezaei (IRI)
13	Fahed Abu Assaf (JOR)
14	Nasser Al-Waleed (IOC)
15	Phatthanapong Srisawat (THA)
16	Abdulaziz Al-Amoodi (QAT)
17	Abdullah Ebrahimi (QAT)
18	Zairul Zaimi (MAS)
19	Hamed Sayyad Ghanbari (IRI)
20	Sinatrio Raharjo (INA)
21	Majed Al-Mansoori (UAE)
22	Yahya Hazazi (KSA)
23	Mohammed Hazazi (KSA)
24	Rajeshor Singh (IND)
25	Ali Al-Mansoori (UAE)
26	Fady Tannous (LIB)
27	Vijay Kumar (IND)
