= Tariq Ali (disambiguation) =

Tariq Ali (born 1943) is a British political activist, writer, and historian.

Tariq Ali (Arabic: طارق علي), and other variants such as Tarek El Ali (Arabic: طارق العلي), may also refer to:

- Tariq Ali (admiral), Pakistan Navy admiral
- Tariq Al-Ali (born 1966), Kuwaiti actor
- Tarek El Ali (born 1986), Lebanese footballer
- Tariq Khan (actor) (Tariq Ali Khan; born 1981), Indian actor
- Tarek Ali Hassan (born 1937), Egyptian academic and musician
- Tarek Ali Abdullah Ahmed Baada (born 1978), Yemeni detainee in Guantanamo Bay
- Mir Tariq Ali Khan Talpur, Pakistani politician

== See also ==
- Ali Tarek (born 1978), Egyptian fencer
- Tariq (disambiguation)
- Ali (disambiguation)
