= Men's team foil at the 2010 World Fencing Championships =

The Men's team foil event took place on November 11, 2010 at Grand Palais.

== Foil team ==
Position	Country	Name
1.	China	Huang Liangcai; Lei Sheng; Zhang Liangliang; Zhu Jun
2.	Italy	Valerio Aspromonte; Andrea Baldini; Stefano Barrera; Andrea Cassarà
3.	Japan	Suguru Awaji; Kenta Chida; Ryo Miyake; Yuki Ota
4.	Russia	Artem Sedov; Aleksey Cheremisinov; Renal Ganeyev; Aleksey Khovanskiy
5.	Germany	Andre Wessels; Benjamin Kleibrink; Peter Joppich; Sebastian Bachmann
6.	France	Marcel Marcilloux; Victor Sintès; Erwan Le Péchoux; Jérémy Cadot
7.	South Korea	Heo Jun; Choi Byung-chul; Kwon Young-ho; Ha Tae-kyu
8.	Great Britain	Edward Jefferies; Jamie Kenber; Laurence Halsted; Marcus Mepstead

Quarter-finals
Italy	45
South Korea	40
Germany	38
Japan	45
Russia	45
France	30
Great Britain	29
China	45

Semi-finals
Italy	45
Japan	30
Russia	38
China	45

Final
Italy	43
China	45
Third place
Japan	45
Russia	42
