= Dan Kellner =

American fencer (born 1976)

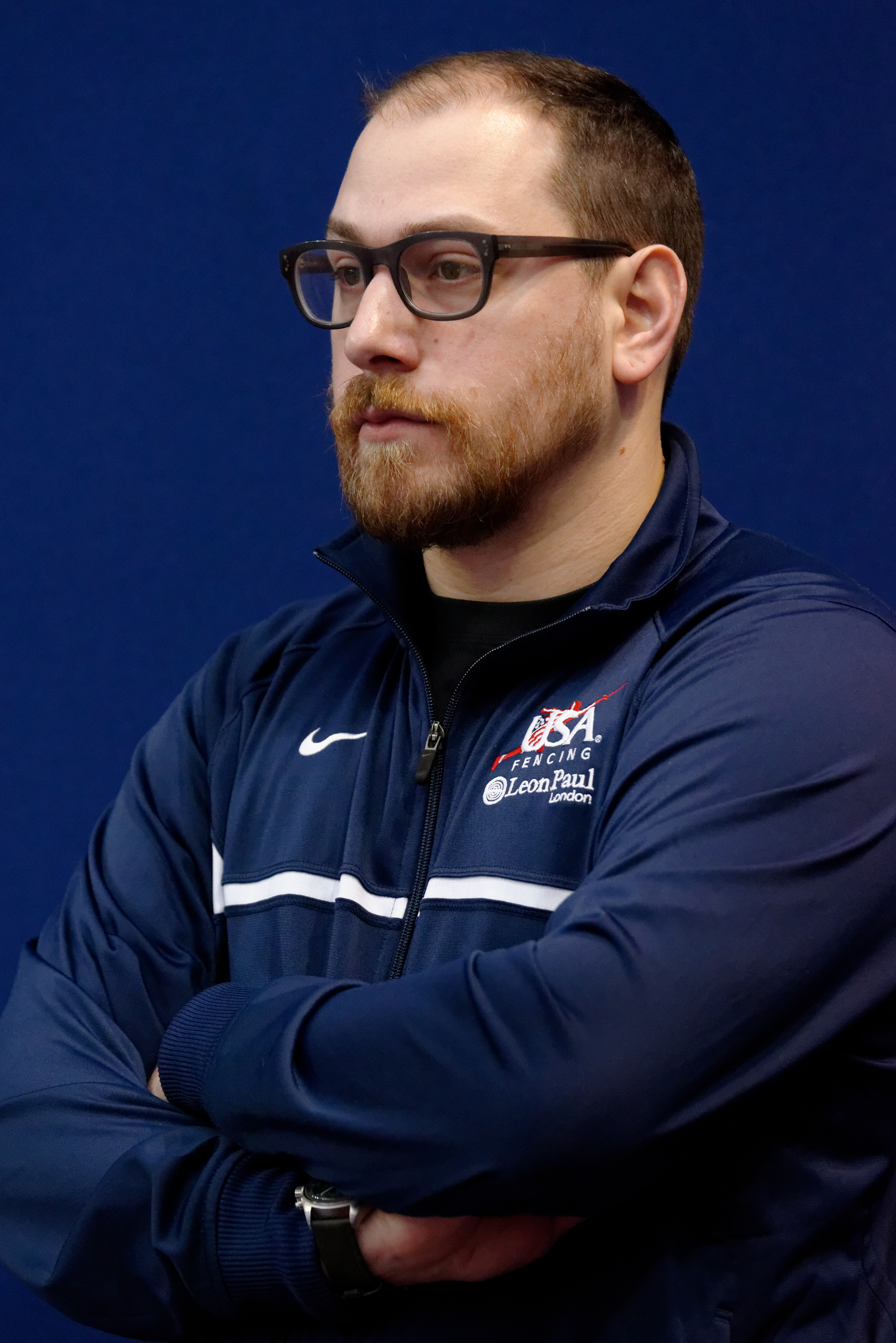
- Kellner in 2015

Personal information
- Born: April 16, 1976 (age 50) Livingston, New Jersey, United States
- Home town: Brooklyn, New York
- Height: 1.80 m (5 ft 11 in)
- Weight: 83 kg (183 lb)

Fencing career
- Sport: Fencing
- Weapon: foil
- Hand: left-handed
- Retired: 2006
- FIE ranking: ranking (archive)
Medal record
Men's foil
Representing United States
Pan American Games
| Gold medal – first place | 2003 Santo Domingo | Individual Foil |
| Gold medal – first place | 2003 Santo Domingo | Team Foil |
| Silver medal – second place | 1999 Winnipeg | Team Foil |
Maccabiah Games
| Silver medal – second place | 2005 Israel | Individual Foil |

Daniel Kellner (born April 16, 1976) is an American Olympic foil fencer. He has won gold and silver medals at the Pan American Games, and a gold medal at the Maccabiah Games.

== Early life ==
Kellner was born in Livingston, New Jersey, and is Jewish.

Kellner attended the Pingry School, graduating in 1994.

== Fencing career ==
=== College ===
Fencing foil for the Columbia Lions fencing team, as he attended Columbia University from which he graduated in 1998 with a degree in American history, Kellner was a 4-time All-American and 3-time All-Ivy League First Team Selection (1995-97-98).

He was the NCAA Fencer of the Year in 1998.

=== Quitting and comeback ===
After failing to make the 2000 Olympic team, Kellner retired from fencing. He returned to fencing three years later and won a gold medal at the 2003 Pan American Games, and his first national foil championship in 2004.

=== US Nationals ===
Kellner was formerly ranked No. 1 in men's foil in the U.S.

He won the foil competition at the U.S. fencing national championships in 2004. Kellner rallied from a 0–6 and 1–7 deficit in his semifinal against Jed Dupree, countered with 7 straight touches, edging ahead to 8–7. The bout went to 14–14 before Kellner won it. In the championship bout, Kellner beat Jonathan Tiomkin 15–6.

He finished 2nd in 1997, 1998, and 2000.

=== World Cups ===
He had podium finishes in World Cups for several seasons in a row.

=== Olympics ===
In the Olympics in Athens he came in 16th in foil, and the U.S. team came in 4th, the highest finish in fifty-six years.

Kellner, seeded 26th, won his first bout, upsetting # 7 seed Cedric Gohy of Belgium, 15–12. His next bout, in the round of 16, was against Richard Kruse of Great Britain. In a very close match, in which he had been leading 14–12, Kellner lost 15–14.

=== Maccabiah Games ===
Kellner decided to skip the 2005 World Cup in Vancouver and the US nationals so he could compete in the 2005 Maccabiah Games in Israel. His international ranking slipped from No. 11 to 12 as a result. He led the U.S. delegation's march into the Ramat Gan stadium alongside legendary swimmers Mark Spitz and Lenny Krayzelburg.

Kellner won the silver medal at the 2005 Maccabiah Games, losing to Israel's Tomer Or 15–9.

=== Pan American Games ===
Kellner won a team silver medal at the 1999 Pan American Games in Canada.

He also won gold medals, both team and individual, at the 2003 Pan American Games. The team trailed 40–30 entering the last match, which Kellner won 15–4, setting off a celebration.

Teammate Jon Tiomkin said: “There are no words to describe it. No words at all. That was absolutely incredible. I've never seen a comeback like that in my life at such a high level competition and with such high stakes.”

=== US Team Captain ===
He was the captain of the U.S. men's foil National Team squad.

He is a 7-time world championship team member.

=== Ranking ===
Dan finished his competitive career ranked 1st in the U.S., 1st in the hemisphere, and 10th in the world, at the time only the second U.S. Men's Foil Fencer ever to be ranked in the FIE Top-16.

== Coaching career ==
Dan is the owner and Head Coach of the Brooklyn Bridge Fencing Club. Prior to opening BBFC in 2010, he was also an assistant coach to Simon Gershon, then the U.S. Men's Foil National Coach. Dan's students have won numerous national and international medals, including a bronze medal at the 2016 Olympic Games, a silver medal at the 2019 World Championships, a Junior World Championship Gold Medal, a Cadet World Championship Gold Medal, as well as other Junior World Cup, Senior World Cup and Grand Prix medals.

In 2015, Dan became the first American coach to have a Men's Foil Fencer win the Overall World Cup, finishing the season #1 in the world.

In 2016, Dan was awarded The Order of Ikkos by the United States Olympic Committee, for excellence in coaching and recognizing his contribution to the US Men's Foil Team winning the bronze medal at the 2016 Olympic Games.

In 2018, Dan was inducted into the U.S. Fencing Hall of Fame.

In 2020, Dan became the first American coach to qualify a European Men's Foil Fencer to the Olympic Games via the individual route and was awarded 2020 Performance Coach of the Year by British Fencing

In 2021, Dan was Team GB Olympic Team Fencing Coach for the 2020 Olympic Games in Tokyo.

== See also ==
- List of select Jewish fencers
- List of USFA Division I National Champions
- List of USFA Hall of Fame members
