= Josh McGuire (disambiguation) =

Josh or Joshua McGuire may refer to:

- Josh Maguire (b. 1980), Australian footballer
- Josh McGuire (fencer) (b. 1983), Canadian fencer
- Joshua McGuire (b. 1987), British actor
- Josh McGuire (b. 1990), Australian rugby league footballer
