= Men's team foil at the 2011 World Fencing Championships =

The Men's team foil event of the 2011 World Fencing Championships took place on October 16, 2011.

== Medalists ==
1st place, gold medalist(s)	China; Zhang Liangliang; Lei Sheng; Zhu Jun; Ma Jianfei
2nd place, silver medalist(s)	France; Marcel Marcilloux; Victor Sintès; Erwann Le Péchoux; Brice Guyart
3rd place, bronze medalist(s)	Germany; Sebastian Bachmann; Peter Joppich; Benjamin Kleibrink; André Weßels

== Draw ==
=== Finals ===
Semifinals
Germany	36
France	45
Poland	34
China	45

Final
France	44
China	45
Third place
Germany	45
Poland	33

=== Top half ===
Round of 32
Italy
Bye
Canada	44
Brazil	45
Great Britain	45
Iran	33
Thailand	20
Germany	45
France	0
Sierra Leone	0
Singapore	39
Israel	41
Egypt	45
Mexico	13
Bye
Russia

Round of 16
Italy	45
Brazil	20
Great Britain	26
Germany	45
France	45
Israel	33
Egypt	35
Russia	45

Quarterfinals
Italy	35
Germany	45
France	45
Russia	40

Semifinals
Germany	36
France	45

=== Bottom half ===
Round of 32
Japan
Bye
Hungary	45
Hong Kong	20
Poland	45
Argentina	31
Colombia	22
United States	45
South Korea	45
Kazakhstan	25
Venezuela	35
Austria	45
Ukraine	45
Belarus	35
Bye
China

Round of 16
Japan	45
Hungary	29
Poland	45
United States	40
South Korea	45
Austria	41
Ukraine	34
China	45

Quarterfinals
Japan	35
Poland	45
South Korea	40
China	45

Semifinals
Poland	34
China	45

=== Placement matches ===
==== 5–8th place ====
5–8th place semifinals
Italy	38
Russia	45
Japan	45
South Korea	40

Fifth place
Russia	32
Japan	45
Seventh place
Italy	45
South Korea	42

==== 9–12th place ====
9–16th place quarterfinals
Brazil	24
Great Britain	45
Israel	38
Egypt	45
Hungary	38
United States	45
Austria	43
Ukraine	45

9–12th place semifinals
Great Britain	45
Egypt	26
United States	42
Ukraine	45

Ninth place
Great Britain	45
Ukraine	33
11th place
Egypt	25
United States	45

==== 13–16th place ====
13–16th place semifinals
Brazil	44
Israel	42
Hungary	40
Austria	42

13th place
Brazil	30
Austria	45
15th place
Israel	27
Hungary	45
