= 2001 Maccabiah Games =

16th edition of Jewish multi-sport event

16th Maccabiah
- Host city: Jerusalem, Israel
- Nations: 49
- Debuting countries: Azerbaijan; Moldova; Taiwan
- Athletes: 3,300
- Events: 38
- Opening: July 16, 2001
- Closing: July 23, 2001
- Torchbearer: Keren Leibovitch
- Main venue: Teddy Stadium

The 16th Maccabiah Games (Hebrew: המכביה ה16 ישראל תשס"א), the Opening Ceremony was held in Jerusalem at Teddy Stadium, while the re-building process of the collapsed bridge and investigations into the collapse continued. The 16th Maccabiah attracted more than 5,000 athletes from 46 countries.

It is considered a 'smaller games' for three reasons: attendance was significantly lower, particularly from the Australians (who sent only about 170 athletes, compared with around 400 in 1997); it was run at the height of the Second Intifada (and straight after the Dolphinarium bombing—the largest of the Intifada—that killed 21 Israelis, mostly high school students); and not all wounds had been healed after the collapse of the bridge.

== History ==
The Maccabiah Games were first held in 1932. In 1961, they were declared a "Regional Sports Event" by, and under the auspices and supervision of, the International Olympic Committee. Among other Olympic and world champions, swimmer Mark Spitz won 10 Maccabiah gold medals before earning his first of nine Olympic gold medals.

== Opening ceremony ==
Over 25,000 people were at the stadium for the opening ceremony. Keren Leibovitch, an Israeli paralympic swimmer who had won three gold medals at the 2000 Paralympics, was given the honor of lighting the torch at the Games at Teddy Stadium in Jerusalem.

Junior futsal and girls' soccer were new sports.

At the opening of the Games on July 16, 2001, Prime Minister Ariel Sharon declared:

"Approximately 2,100 years ago, the Maccabees lit the torch in Modi'in and carried it to the gates of Jerusalem, in the Jewish people's struggle for freedom in its homeland. The same fire of freedom and faith, which was not extinguished during 2,000 years, is, today, passed on to you.... You represent the spirit of the Maccabees who fought for Jerusalem and for Jewish rights and independence 2,167 years ago."

== Notable competitors ==
Gold medalist Lenny Krayzelburg of the United States set a new record in the 100-meter backstroke. He also won a gold medal in the 4 X 100M medley relay. Krayzekburg was chosen by the US team to carry their flag at the opening ceremony. Noah Pink competed in swimming for Canada.

Russian Olympic champion fencers Sergey Sharikov and Maria Mazina won gold medals in men's sabre and women's foil. Vadim Gutzeit of Ukraine, who nine years earlier won an Olympic gold medal in team sabre, won a silver medal in sabre, as he lost to Sharikov. Jonathan Tiomkin of the US, who later was a Pan American Games gold medalist, won silver medals in team foil and team épée. Lydia Hatuel-Czuckermann won the bronze medal for Israel in the women's individual foil competition.

Doug Gottlieb won a gold medal in basketball with Team USA, and was named basketball MVP. Israeli pole vaulter Alex Averbuch won a gold medal. Russian grandmaster Evgeny Alekseev won a gold medal in chess.

Nicolás Valansi competed in soccer for Argentina, which won a gold medal, as he was named tournament MVP. Joe Jacobson represented Great Britain in soccer, at the age of 14. Jonathan Kestenbaum, Baron Kestenbaum of Foxcote competed for Great Britain in soccer in the masters.

Chilean tennis player Nicolás Massú competed, but did not earn a medal. Canadian volleyball player and future Olympian Josh Binstock competed for Canada.

== Participating communities ==
The number in parentheses indicates the number of participants that community contributed.

- Argentina
- Australia (170)
- Austria
- Azerbaijan
- Belarus
- Belgium
- Brazil (115)
- Bulgaria
- Canada (300)
- Chile
- Colombia
- Costa Rica
- Croatia
- Denmark
- Finland
- France (138)
- Georgia
- Germany (54)
- Gibraltar
- Great Britain (160)
- Greece
- Guatemala
- Holland (1)
- Hungary
- Israel (1,300)
- Italy
- Latvia
- Lithuania
- Mexico
- Moldova
- New Zealand
- Panama
- Paraguay
- Peru
- Poland
- Russia
- Slovakia
- Spain
- South Africa
- Sweden
- Switzerland
- Taiwan (2)
- Turkey
- Ukraine
- USA(387)
- Uruguay
- Venezuela
- Zimbabwe

== Medal count ==
* Host nation (Israel)

Rank	Nation	Gold	Silver	Bronze	Total
1	Israel (ISR)*	223	192	159	574
2	United States (USA)	34	54	61	149
3	Russia (RUS)	22	15	18	55
4	South Africa (RSA)	5	8	14	27
5	Argentina (ARG)	5	5	3	13
6	France (FRA)	5	3	8	16
7	Ukraine (UKR)	4	6	1	11
8	Brazil (BRA)	4	1	8	13
9	Great Britain (GBR)	3	3	6	12
10	Hungary (HUN)	2	2	2	6
11	Australia (AUS)	2	0	4	6
12	Turkey (TUR)	2	0	1	3
13	Canada (CAN)	1	11	11	23
14	Mexico (MEX)	1	4	17	22
15	Belarus (BLR)	1	0	0	1
15	Kazakhstan (KAZ)	1	0	0	1
17	Venezuela (VEN)	0	3	1	4
18	Georgia (GEO)	0	2	0	2
19	Germany (GER)	0	1	6	7
20	Austria (AUT)	0	1	0	1
20	Azerbaijan (AZE)	0	1	0	1
22	Croatia (CRO)	0	0	2	2
23	Chile (CHI)	0	0	1	1
23	Sweden (SWE)	0	0	1	1
Totals (24 entries)		315	312	324	951
