= Zhang Liangliang =

Chinese fencer

Personal information
- Born: 1 October 1982 (age 43) Anhui, China
- Height: 1.80 m (5 ft 11 in)
- Weight: 82 kg (181 lb; 12.9 st)

Fencing career
- Sport: Fencing
- Country: China
- Weapon: Foil
- Hand: Left-handed
- Club: Wanghaibin International Fencing Club
- FIE ranking: current ranking
Medal record
Universiade
Gold medal – first place	2003 Daegu	Individual foil
Asian Games
Gold medal – first place	2006 Doha	Team foil
Gold medal – first place	2010 Guangzhou	Team foil
Bronze medal – third place	2006 Doha	Individual foil
World Fencing Championships
Gold medal – first place	2010 Paris	Team foil
Gold medal – first place	2011 Catania	Team foil
Silver medal – second place	2005 Leipzig	Individual foil

Zhang Liangliang (Chinese: 张亮亮; born 1 October 1982) is a Chinese foil fencer. He competed in the men's team foil competition at the 2012 Summer Olympics.
