= Fencing at the 2004 Summer Olympics =

Fencing at the Games of the XXVIII Olympiad
- Venue: Helliniko Olympic Complex
- Dates: 14–22 August 2004

Fencing at the 2004 Summer Olympics took place at the Fencing Hall at the Hellinikon Olympic Complex. Ten gold medals were awarded in individual and team events, further divided into three styles of fencing: épée, foil and sabre.

Fencing is one of the few sports that have been featured in every modern Olympic Games, and for the first time female competitors competed individually using the sabre. The Lexan window mask, showing the athletes' faces, was used for the first time at these Olympics.

== Medal summary ==
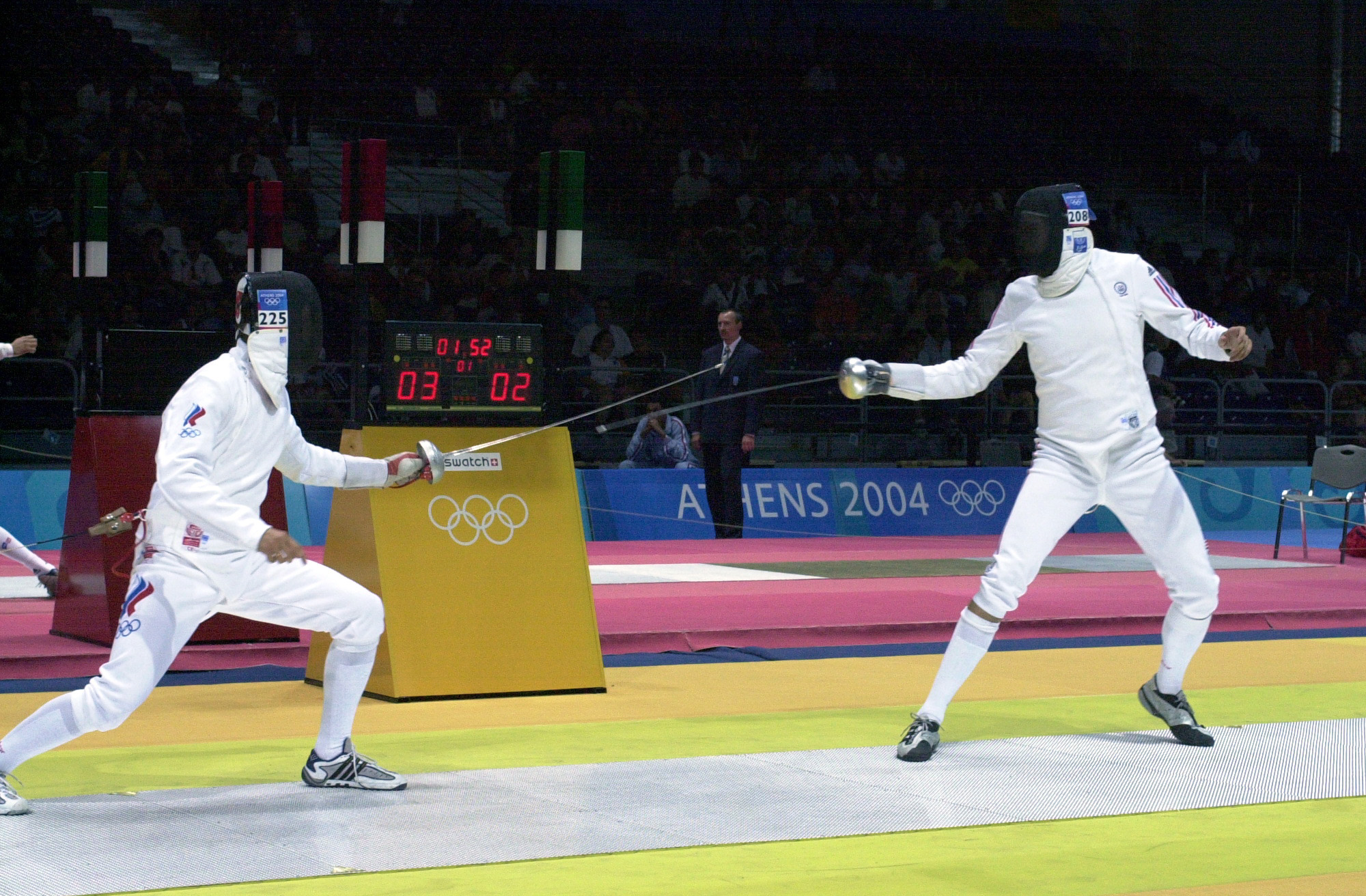
Russian Igor Turchin and American Weston Kelsey duel in the second round of the Olympic men's individual épée event at the Hellinikon Fencing Hall on 17 August 2004

=== Men's events ===
| Event | Gold | Silver | Bronze |
|---|---|---|---|
| Individual épée | Marcel Fischer; Switzerland | Wang Lei; China | Pavel Kolobkov; Russia |
| Team épée | France; Fabrice Jeannet; Jérôme Jeannet; Hugues Obry; Érik Boisse | Hungary; Gábor Boczkó; Krisztián Kulcsár; Iván Kovács; Géza Imre | Germany; Sven Schmid; Jörg Fiedler; Daniel Strigel |
| Individual foil | Brice Guyart; France | Salvatore Sanzo; Italy | Andrea Cassarà; Italy |
| Team foil | Italy; Andrea Cassarà; Salvatore Sanzo; Simone Vanni | China; Dong Zhaozhi; Wang Haibin; Wu Hanxiong; Ye Chong | Russia; Renal Ganeev; Youri Moltchan; Rouslan Nassiboulline; Vyacheslav Pozdnyakov |
| Individual sabre | Aldo Montano; Italy | Zsolt Nemcsik; Hungary | Vladyslav Tretiak; Ukraine |
| Team sabre | France; Julien Pillet; Damien Touya; Gael Touya | Italy; Aldo Montano; Gianpiero Pastore; Luigi Tarantino | Russia; Sergey Sharikov; Aleksey Dyachenko; Stanislav Pozdnyakov; Aleksey Yakimenko |

=== Women's events ===
| Games | Gold | Silver | Bronze |
|---|---|---|---|
| Individual épée | Tímea Nagy; Hungary | Laura Flessel-Colovic; France | Maureen Nisima; France |
| Team épée | Russia; Karina Aznavourian; Oxana Ermakova; Tatiana Logounova; Anna Sivkova | Germany; Claudia Bokel; Imke Duplitzer; Britta Heidemann | France; Sarah Daninthe; Laura Flessel-Colovic; Hajnalka Kiraly Picot; Maureen Nisima |
| Individual foil | Valentina Vezzali; Italy | Giovanna Trillini; Italy | Sylwia Gruchała; Poland |
| Individual sabre | Mariel Zagunis; United States | Tan Xue; China | Sada Jacobson; United States |

== Medal table ==
Italy finished top of the fencing medal table at the 2004 Summer Olympics.

| Rank | Nation | Gold | Silver | Bronze | Total |
|---|---|---|---|---|---|
| 1 | Italy | 3 | 3 | 1 | 7 |
| 2 | France | 3 | 1 | 2 | 6 |
| 3 | Hungary | 1 | 2 | 0 | 3 |
| 4 | Russia | 1 | 0 | 3 | 4 |
| 5 | United States | 1 | 0 | 1 | 2 |
| 6 | Switzerland | 1 | 0 | 0 | 1 |
| 7 | China | 0 | 3 | 0 | 3 |
| 8 | Germany | 0 | 1 | 1 | 2 |
| 9 | Poland | 0 | 0 | 1 | 1 |
| 9 | Ukraine | 0 | 0 | 1 | 1 |
| Totals (10 entries) | | 10 | 10 | 10 | 30 |

== Participating nations ==
A total of 223 fencers (129 men and 94 women) from 42 nations competed at the Athens Games:

- Algeria (7)
- Argentina (1)
- Australia (3)
- Austria (2)
- Azerbaijan (1)
- Belgium (1)
- Belarus (2)
- Brazil (3)
- Canada (6)
- Chile (1)
- China (19)
- Colombia (1)
- Republic of the Congo (1)
- Cuba (4)
- Egypt (9)
- France (19)
- Germany (12)
- Great Britain (2)
- Greece (9)
- Hong Kong (3)
- Hungary (15)
- Israel (1)
- Italy (12)
- Japan (5)
- Mexico (1)
- Morocco (1)
- Netherlands (1)
- New Zealand (1)
- Poland (3)
- Portugal (1)
- Romania (6)
- Russia (18)
- Senegal (2)
- South Africa (3)
- South Korea (12)
- Spain (1)
- Switzerland (1)
- Thailand (2)
- Tunisia (2)
- Ukraine (10)
- United States (15)
- Venezuela (4)
