= Nicolás Valansi =

Argentine-Israeli footballer

Nicolás Valansi ניקולס ולנסי
Personal information
- Full name: Nicolás Valansi ניקולס ולנסי
- Date of birth: 11 April 1979 (age 47)
- Place of birth: Argentina
- Position: Attacking midfielder

Team information
- Current team: acabado
- Number: 9

Senior career*
Years	Team	Apps	(Gls)
–2005	Ironi Kiryat Shmona		
2005–2006	Hapoel Ramat Gan		
2006–2007	Maccabi Kafr Kanna	29	(2)
2007–2008	Hapoel Afula	23	(5)
2008–2012	Hapoel Hadera	21	(14)
2013–2024	Sportivo Chimichurri	?	(?)
- * Club domestic league appearances and goals as of 00:24, 13 September 2009 (UTC)

Nicolás Valansi
Medal record

Representing Argentina

Football

Maccabiah Games
Gold medal – first place	2001 Maccabiah	Football

Nicolás Valansi (Hebrew: ניקולס ולנסי; born 11 April 1979) is an Argentine-Israeli footballer playing in Sportivo Chimichurri.

== Playing career ==
Valansi competed in Israel with the Argentina national football team in the 2001 Maccabiah Games. Valansi was named the tournament MVP, and led Argentina to a gold medal victory over their Mexican counterparts.

Valansi was a central part of the midfield of Ironi Kiryat Shmona while they were in the Liga Leumit.

In 2009, the IFA discovered that Valansi was contracted with Maccabi Kafr Kanna even though he left the club. Kafr Kanna were fined, and had two points deducted from them in the league table.

Valansi played with Hapoel Hadera until he was released in January 2012. In 2013 he returned to Argentina, and now plays amateur side Sportivo Chimichurri from Uruguay.

== Statistics ==
Club performance			League		Cup		League Cup		Continental		Total	
Season	Club	League	Apps	Goals	Apps	Goals	Apps	Goals	Apps	Goals	Apps	Goals
Israel			League		Israel State Cup		Toto Cup		Europe		Total	
2003–2004	Ironi Kiryat Shmona	Liga Leumit	-	-	-	-	-	-	-	-	-	-
2004–2005	Ironi Kiryat Shmona	Liga Leumit	-	-	-	-	-	-	-	-	-	-
2005–2006	Hapoel Ramat Gan	Liga Artzit	-	-	-	-	-	-	-	-	-	-
2006–2007	Maccabi Kafr Kanna	Liga Artzit	29	2	2	3	9	2	0	0	40	7
2007–2008	Hapoel Afula	Liga Alef	23	5	2	0	0	0	0	0	25	5
2008–2009	Hapoel Hadera	Liga Alef	21	11	1	0	0	0	0	0	22	12
Total	Israel											
Career total												
