= Josh McGuire (fencer) =

Canadian fencer (born 1983)

Personal information
- Born: June 15, 1983 (age 43) Hamilton, Ontario, Canada

Sport
- Country: Canada
- Sport: Fencing
- Club: Dual Nature Fencing

Joshua "Josh" McGuire (born June 15, 1983) is a Canadian fencer who competed at the 2004 and 2008 Summer Olympics. McGuire competed in the individual foil at both Games reaching the round of 32 in 2004 and the last 16 in 2008.

McGuire took the gold medal at the 2000 Cadet Men's Foil World Championships. As a junior, he won a bronze medal at 2002 Junior World Championships.
