= Tariq Ali (admiral) =

Admiral in the Pakistan Navy

Rear Admiral Tariq Ali HI(M) SI(M) TI(M)
- Born: Tariq Ali
- Education: National Defence University; Pakistan Naval War College
- Military career
- Allegiance: Pakistan
- Branch/Service: Pakistan Navy
- Service years: 1986 – 2022(Retd)
- Rank: , Rear Admiral
- Unit: Naval Supply Branch
- Commands: Deputy Chief of the Naval Staff, Supply, NHQ; Assistant Chief of the Naval Staff, Supply; Commander, Depots; (COMDEP); Director Inventory Control Point; (DICP); Director Naval Stores; Director Surface Stores
- Conflicts: 2001–2002 India–Pakistan standoff; 2016 India-Pakistan military confrontation; 2019 India–Pakistan border skirmishes
- Awards: Hilal-e-Imtiaz (Military); Sitara-e-Imtiaz (Military); Tamgha-e-Imtiaz (Military)

Rear Admiral (R) Tariq Ali HI(M) SI(M) TI(M) is a retired Two Star Admiral and a flag officer from the Pakistan Navy and has served as the Deputy Chief of the Naval Staff (Supply), DCNS-S at Naval Headquarters in Islamabad. He took the office as Head of Supply branch of Pakistan Navy in March 2020. Before this he has also served in the field as Commander, Depots (COMDEP) in Karachi.

== Biography ==
Tariq Ali joined the Pakistan Navy in 1982 and got commission in Supply Branch in 1986. He is a graduate of Pakistan Navy War College Lahore and National Defence University Islamabad.

== Career ==
He served at both command and staff units throughout his career. His staff appointments and commands includes Assistant Chief of the Naval Staff, Supply (ACNS-S), Commander Depots (COMDEP), and Director Inventory Control Point (DICP). His command assignments includes senior staff officer to Commander, Karachi, Director Naval Stores, Director Surface Stores at Naval Headquarters Islamabad and staff officer for Integrated Logistic Support for F-22P Frigates.

During his previous assignment as senior staff officer to Commander, Karachi (2011–2012), he was transferred to the Karachi Naval Dockyard where he served as Controller Inventory Control Point (CICP) for almost two years. In 2014 when he was promoted to the rank of Commodore, he was appointed as the Director Inventory Control Point of Dockyard for three months.

On 1 July 2014 Commodore Tariq Ali took over the Command of Commander, Depots (COMDEP) a major and crucial type command of the supply branch located in Karachi and he remained COMDEP for two years, Afterwards he was transferred to Islamabad to complete his war course at the National Defence University from 2016 to 2017.

After completing the war course from NDU he then was transferred to naval headquarters where he was serving as the Assistant Chief of the Naval Staff, Supply from July 2017 to November 2019. He was promoted to the rank of Rear Admiral on 3 March 2020 and was appointed as the Deputy Chief of the Naval Staff for Supply branch at NHQ till 14 September 2022 which was the last post he served in the Pakistan Navy before retiring from service.

=== Effective dates of promotion ===
Insignia	Rank	Date
	Rear Admiral (DCNS-S)	March 2020 to September 2022
	Commodore	July 2014
	Captain	April 2008
	Commander	March 2002
	Lieutenant commander	
	Lieutenant	
	Sub Lieutenant	
	Midshipman	September 1986

== Awards and decorations ==

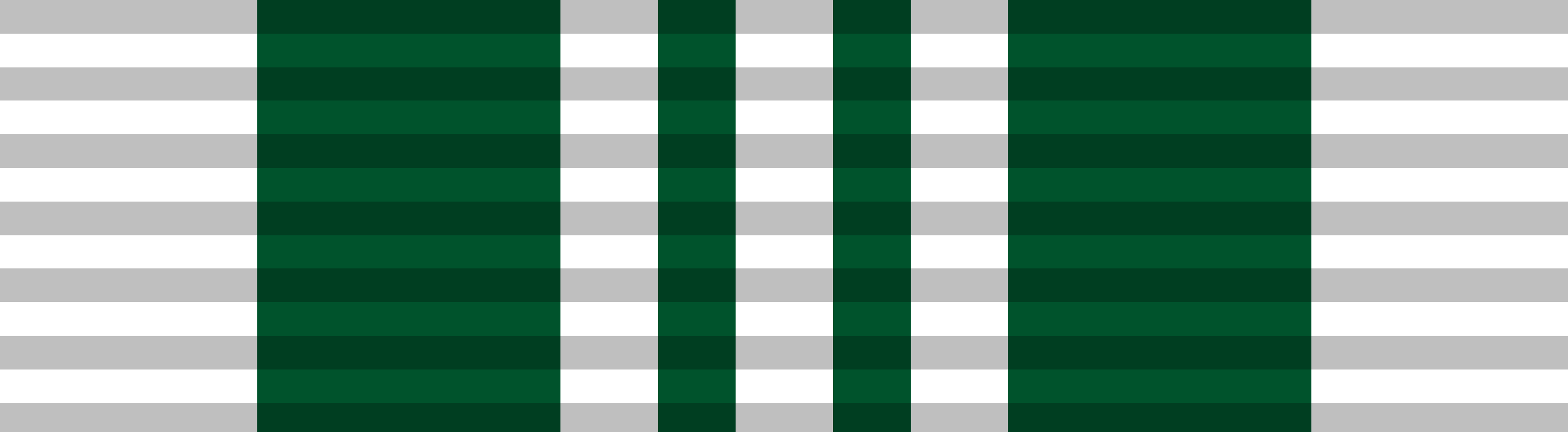

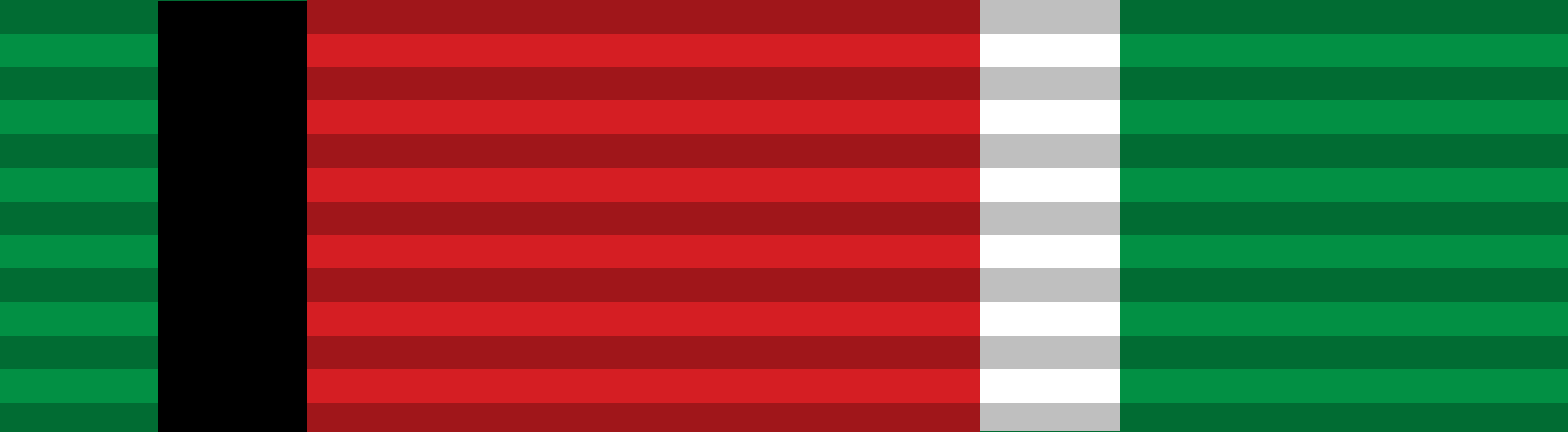

	Hilal-e-Imtiaz (Military) (Crescent of Excellence)		
Sitara-e-Imtiaz (Military) (Star of Excellence)	Tamgha-e-Imtiaz (Military) (Medal of Excellence)	Tamgha-e-Baqa (Nuclear Test Medal) 1998	Tamgha-e-Istaqlal Pakistan (Escalation with India Medal) 2002
Tamgha-e-Azm (Medal of Conviction) (2018)	10 Years Service Medal	20 Years Service Medal	30 Years Service Medal
35 Years Service Medal	Jamhuriat Tamgha (Democracy Medal) 1988	Qarardad-e-Pakistan Tamgha (Resolution Day Golden Jubilee Medal) 1990	Tamgha-e-Salgirah Pakistan (Independence Day Golden Jubilee Medal) 1997
