= Sofiane el Azizi =

Algerian fencer

Personal information
- Born: 15 April 1979 (age 47)

Sport
- Sport: Fencing

Sofiane el Azizi (born 15 April 1979) is an Algerian fencer. He competed in the individual foil event at the 2004 Summer Olympics, coming in 32nd.
