= Vyacheslav Pozdnyakov =

Russian fencer

Personal information
- Born: 17 June 1978 (age 48) Yaroslavl, Russia

Sport
- Sport: Fencing
Medal record
Men's fencing
Representing Russia
Olympic Games
Bronze medal – third place	2004 Athens	Sabre foil

Vyacheslav Vladimirovich Pozdnyakov (Russian: Вячеслав Владимирович Поздняков) (born 17 June 1978 in Yaroslavl) is a Russian fencer, who has won bronze Olympic medal in the team foil competition at the 2004 Summer Olympics in Athens.
