= Loïc Attely =

French fencer

Personal information
- Born: 26 November 1977 (age 48) Cambrai, Nord, France

Sport
- Sport: Fencing

Loïc Attely (born 26 November 1977) is a French fencer. He competed in the individual and team foil events at the 2004 Summer Olympics.
