= Cédric Gohy =

Belgian fencer

Personal information
- Born: 16 February 1975 (age 51) Verviers, Liège, Belgium

Sport
- Sport: Fencing

Cédric Gohy (born 16 February 1975) is a Belgian fencer. He competed in the individual foil event at the 2004 Summer Olympics.
