= Suguru Awaji =

Japanese fencer (born 1989)

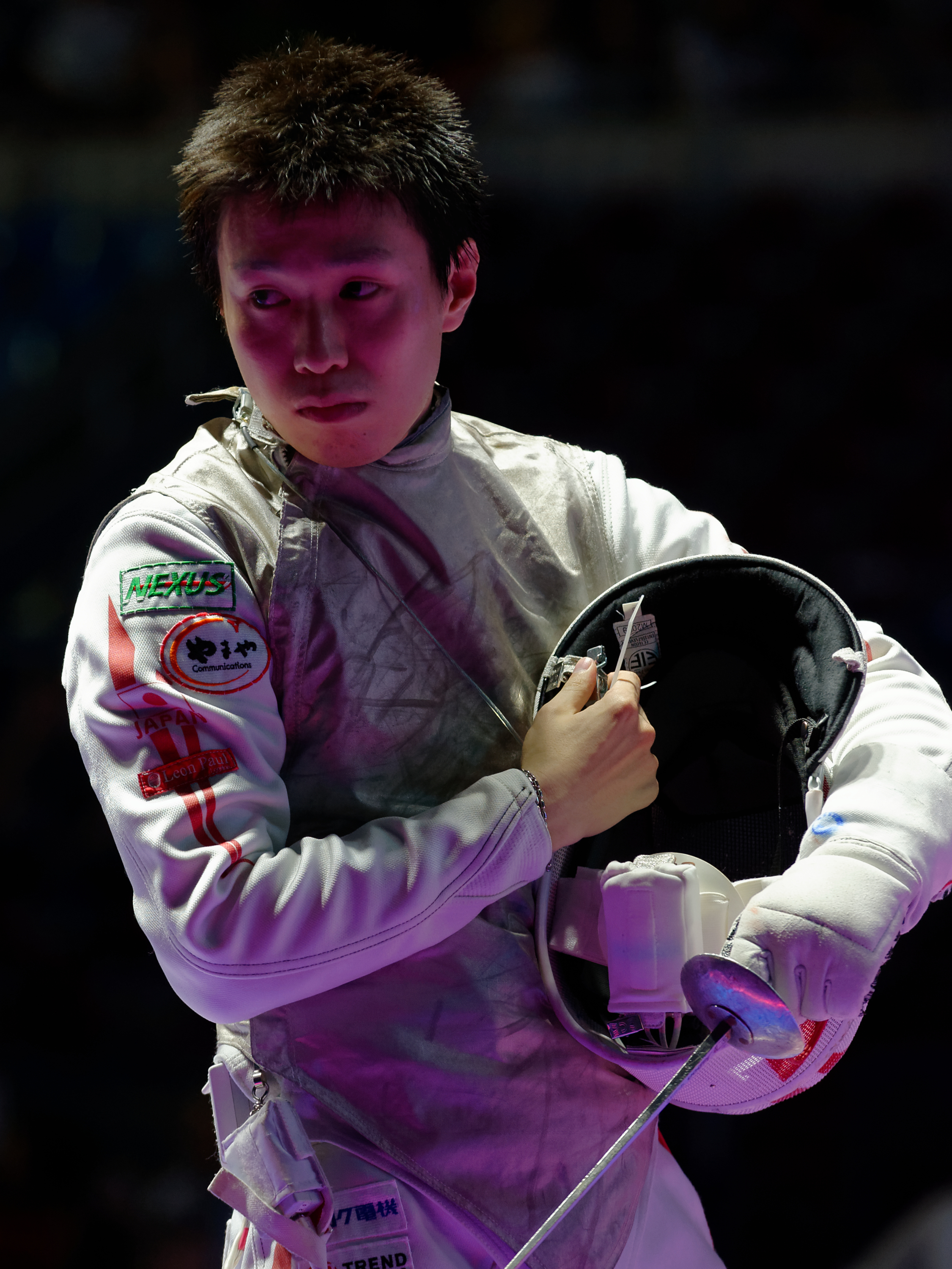

Personal information
- Born: 26 July 1989 (age 37) Sendai, Miyagi, Japan
- Height: 1.74 m (5 ft 9 in)
- Weight: 67 kg (148 lb)

Fencing career
- Sport: Fencing
- Weapon: foil
- Hand: left-handed
- National coach: Oleg Matseichuk
- FIE ranking: current ranking
Medal record
Men's Foil
Representing Japan
Olympic Games
Silver medal – second place	2012 London	Team

Suguru Awaji (淡路 卓, Awaji Suguru; born 26 July 1989) is a Japanese fencer. At the 2012 Summer Olympics he won a silver medal in the team foil event. In 2008, he was the Junior Men's Foil World Champion.
