= Park Hui-gyeong =

South Korean fencer

Personal information
- Born: 8 June 1979 (age 47)
- Height: 173 cm (5 ft 8 in)
- Weight: 73 kg (161 lb)

Korean name
- Hangul: 박희경
- RR: Bak Huigyeong
- MR: Pak Hŭigyŏng

Sport
- Country: South Korea
- Sport: Fencing
- Event: Foil

Park Hui-gyeong (Korean: 박희경, also transliterated Park Hee-kyung, born 8 June 1979) is a South Korean fencer. He competed in the individual and team foil events at the 2004 Summer Olympics.
