= Mostafa Nagaty =

Egyptian fencer

Personal information
- Born: 5 April 1983 (age 43)

Sport
- Sport: Fencing

Mostafa Nagaty (born 5 April 1983) is an Egyptian fencer. He competed in the individual foil events at the 2008 Summer Olympics and 2004 Summer Olympics and in the team foil events at the 2004 Summer Olympics.
