= Jedediah Dupree =

American fencer (born 1979)

Personal information
- Born: October 7, 1979 (age 46) Hanover, New Hampshire, United States

Sport
- Sport: Fencing
Medal record
Men's fencing
Representing United States
Pan American Games
Gold medal – first place	2003 Santo Domingo	Team foil
Representing Columbia University
NCAA Fencing Championships
Gold medal – first place	2001 Columbia University	Individual foil

William Jedediah "Jed" Dupree (born October 7, 1979) is an American men's foil fencer. He was the 2001 NCAA Champion in individual men's foil, and the 2002 and 2005 National Champion in individual foil. He represented the United States at the 2004 Summer Olympics and won a gold medal in team foil at the 2003 Pan American Games.

He is currently a head foil coach at Fencers Club in New York, NY. On August 12, 2013, Harvard announced that Dupree had been hired as an assistant coach.

He fenced for the Columbia Lions fencing team. Dupree graduated from Columbia University in 2001.

== See also ==
- List of NCAA fencing champions
