= Youri Moltchan =

Russian foil fencer (born 1983)

Personal information
- Born: 8 April 1983 (age 43) Tiraspol, Transnistria, Moldova

Fencing career
- Sport: Fencing
- Weapon: Foil
Medal record
Men's fencing
Representing Russia
Olympic Games
Bronze medal – third place	2004 Athens	Team foil

Youri Moltchan (also Yury Molchan, Russian: Юрий Молчан; born 8 April 8, 1983, in Moldova) is a Russian foil fencer. He won a bronze medal in the team foil event at the 2004 Summer Olympics.

== Career highlights ==
2003
World Junior Championships, Trapani, (bronze) 3rd
2004
World Cup, Paris, (silver) 2nd
Summer Olympics, Athens, 25th
2005
Grand Prix, A Coruña, (silver) 2nd
World Cup, Vancouver, (silver) 2nd
World Championships, Leipzig, 33rd
2006
World Cup, Seoul, (bronze) 3rd
World Cup, Bonn, (bronze) 3rd
World Championships, Turin, 21st
2007
World Championships, St. Petersburg, 55th
2008
World Cup, Copenhagen, (gold) 1st
