= Tamer Mohamed Tahoun =

Egyptian fencer

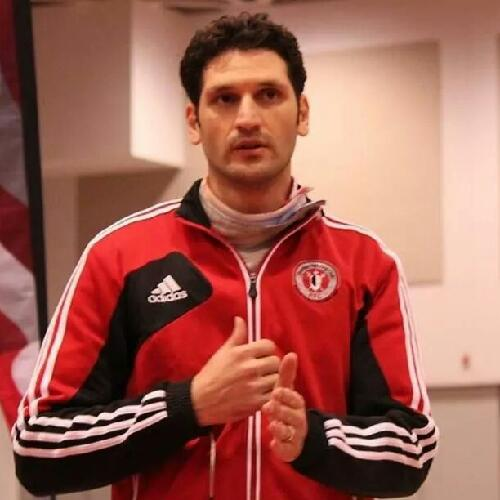

Personal information
- Born: 1 January 1977 (age 49)
- Height: 187 cm (6 ft 2 in)

Sport
- Sport: Fencing

Tamer Tahoun (born 1 January 1977, Cairo) is an Egyptian foil fencer and one of the head coaches at Star Fencing Academy near Boston, MA.

He was the Egyptian Senior National Champion for 10 years from 1999 to 2008, 5 times African individual gold medalist champion (years 1999, 2000, 2001, 2004 and 2006) and participated in the Junior and Senior World Championships as well as in two Olympic Games (Sydney 2000, Athens 2004). He finished 15th in the 2004 Summer Olympics in Athens. He competed in Junior and Senior World Cups, and reached his highest rank in top 16 of the FIE Ranking in 2004 -2005.

Tamer Received his coaching diploma from the General Syndicate of Professions Sports Cairo, Egypt. He worked as the Egyptian National foil team coach for the senior, junior and cadet teams (men and women) from January 2009 until September 2011, He was coaching the Egyptian youth olympic team at the youth Olympic games Singapore 2010,- 2024 Paris Olympic games, Team Egypt Olympic Coach also he was the Fencing Head Coach and Technical Director at El Gezira sporting Club in Cairo from 2008 to 2011, he worked for a period of time with the Italian Maistro Andrea Borella and he got the title of Prévôt De fleuret (Provost of foil) from the US fencing coaching association.- Premier Fencing Club NJ Head Coach 2012-2021 - NJIT foil coach season 2019-2020 , He is an FIE International referee in the disciplines of foil and epee.
