= Simone Vanni =

Italian fencer (born 1979)

Personal information
- Born: 16 February 1979 (age 47) Pisa, Italy
- Height: 1.76 m (5 ft 9 in)
- Weight: 73 kg (161 lb)

Fencing career
- Sport: Fencing
- Weapon: foil
- Hand: right-handed
- Club: Fiamme Oro
- FIE ranking: archive
Medal record
Men's foil
Representing Italy
Olympic Games
| Gold medal – first place | 2004 Athens | Team |
World Championships
| Gold medal – first place | 2002 Lisbon | Individual |
| Gold medal – first place | 2003 Havana | Team |
| Gold medal – first place | 2009 Antalya | Team |
| Silver medal – second place | 2003 Havana | Individual |
| Silver medal – second place | 2005 Leipzig | Team |
| Bronze medal – third place | 2006 Turin | Team |
European Championships
| Gold medal – first place | 2001 Coblenz | Individual |
| Gold medal – first place | 2009 Plovdiv | Team |
| Bronze medal – third place | 2007 Ghent | Team |

Simone Vanni (born 16 February 16, 1979, in Pisa, Italy) is an Italian Olympic foil fencer. He won a team gold medal in Athens in the 2004 Olympics.
