= Ruslan Nasibulin =

Russian fencer

Personal information
- Born: 2 March 1981 (age 45) Verkhoturye, Russia
Medal record
Men's fencing
Representing Russia
Olympic Games
| Bronze medal – third place | 2004 Athens | Team foil |

Ruslan Rafikovich Nasibulin (Russian: Руслан Рафикович Насибулин, also spelled Rouslan Nassiboulline, born 2 March 1981 in Verkhoturye, Sverdlovsk Oblast) is a Russian fencer, who has won bronze Olympic medal in the team foil competition at the 2004 Summer Olympics in Athens.
