= Ali Tarek =

Egyptian fencer

Personal information
- Born: 20 September 1978 (age 47)

Sport
- Sport: Fencing

Ali Tarek (born 20 September 1978) is an Egyptian fencer. He competed in the team foil event at the 2004 Summer Olympics.
