= Zhu Jun (fencer) =

Chinese fencer

Medal record

Representing China

Men's Fencing

World Championships
Gold medal – first place	2010 Paris	Team foil
Gold medal – first place	2011 Catania	Team foil
Silver medal – second place	2009 Antalya	Foil

Universiade
Gold medal – first place	2011 Shenzhen	Team foil
Bronze medal – third place	2011 Shenzhen	Foil

Zhu Jun (Chinese: 朱俊; pinyin: Zhū Jùn; born 2 July 1984 in Gaoyou, Yangzhou, Jiangsu) is a Chinese foil fencer, who competed at the 2008 Summer Olympics and the 2012 Summer Olympics.

== Major performances ==
- 2003 World Junior Championships - 1st team/individual
- 2006 Asian Games - 1st team;
- 2008 Beijing Olympics - 4th Individual
- 2008 World Cup Germany - 3rd
- 2009 World Fencing Championships - 2nd。

== See also ==
- China at the 2008 Summer Olympics
