= Lau Kwok Kin =

Hong Kong fencer

Personal information
- Nationality: Hong Konger
- Born: 17 January 1977 (age 49) Hong Kong
- Height: 177 cm (5 ft 10 in)
- Website: www.hkfencingmaster.com

Sport
- Country: Hong Kong
- Sport: Fencing
- Event: foil
- Club: HK FENCING MASTER (香港劍瑪斯特劍擊學院-奧運教練）
- Team: Hong Kong Fencing Team
- Now coaching: HK Fencing Team Leading Coach for World University Games for several years

Achievements and titles
- Olympic finals: 2004, 2008
- Highest world ranking: Hong Kong Rank Number 1 for several years
Medal record
Men's fencing
Representing Hong Kong
Asian Games
Bronze medal – third place	2006 Doha	Foil Team
Bronze medal – third place	2010 GuangZhou	Foil Team
Asian Championship
Bronze medal – third place	2003	Foil Team
Bronze medal – third place	2004	Foil Team
Bronze medal – third place	2007	Foil Team
Bronze medal – third place	2008	Foil Team
Bronze medal – third place	2009	Foil Team
Bronze medal – third place	2010	Foil Team
National Championship
Bronze medal – third place	2006	Mens Foil
Silver medal – second place	2004	Foil Team
Thailand Open Championship
Gold medal – first place	2003	Mens Foil
Gold medal – first place	2003	Foil Team 2006 World Championship top 16
Asian Veteran Championship
Bronze medal – third place	2017 Thailand	Foil Team
Silver medal – second place	2017 Thailand	Mens Foil
Bronze medal – third place	2018 Japan	Foil Team
Bronze medal – third place	2018 Japan	Mens Foil
Bronze medal – third place	2019 Taiwan	Foil Team
Gold medal – first place	2019 Taiwan	Mens Foil

Lau Kwok Kin (Chinese: 劉國堅; Jyutping: lau^{4} gwok^{3} gin^{1}; born 17 January 1977) is a fencer from Hong Kong, China who won a bronze medal at the 2006 Asian Games and 2010 Asian Games in the men's foil team competition. As one of the few 2-time Olympians from Hong Kong, he was the first one to officially qualified (NB) to competed at the 2004 and 2008 Olympic Games.

He is the first Hong Kong Male Athlete to receive bronze medal from National Fencing Championship in China, and the first Hong Kong male athlete to enter into TOP 16 in the World Fencing Championship.

== Career ==
Lau Kwok Kin took up fencing in the 7th Grade, he got Hong Kong All primary school fencing champion during the first year he learned fencing.

=== Olympic Games ===
In 2004, he participated in the Olympic qualification game for the Asia & Oceania region (AOR). He achieved first place in this qualifying event, securing the qualification to represent Hong Kong in the Summer Olympic Game in Athens. As there was no participation in qualifying events required for Olympians before 1996, this made Lau the first Hong Kong fencer to officially qualify for the Olympic games.

In 2008, Lau represented Hong Kong at the 2008 Summer Olympics in Beijing. He was the only Hong Kong fencer to receive the necessary qualifications to participate in Olympics, and one of only two qualifying fencers from the AOR.

Qualification of Olympic Games: Before 1996, there was no requirement to compete for "Qualification" for participating in Olympic games. Any country can send representative to participate. Since after 1996, as there is increasing number of participating countries, so the committee has decided to implement a qualification policy where the athlete must compete within their zone to get the qualification.

=== Asian Games ===
Lau has participated in the Asian Games in 1998, 2002, 2006, 2010, and 2018.

In the 2006 and 2010 Asian Games, he won bronze medals.

In August 2019 he won the gold medal in the foil individual event of the men's 40 to 49-year-old group at the 5th Asian Veteran Fencing Championships.

He was also invited as honorary coach for the HK Fencing community outreach where he volunteer coaching for community service

=== Coaching at World University Game ===
In 2023, he is appointed as leading coach for Hong Kong fencing team to participate at Chengdu Universiade. During that event, hong kong team won individual and team gold medals in Men's Foil see WP:CITE.
