= Jonathan Tiomkin =

American fencer (born 1979)

Personal information
- Born: July 12, 1979 (age 46) Brooklyn, New York, United States

Sport
- Sport: Fencing
- Event(s): Foil and epee
- College team: St. John's University
- Club: Fencers Club
- Coached by: Simon Gershon and Mikhail Petin
Medal record
Men's fencing
Representing United States
Pan American Games
Gold medal – first place	2003 Santo Domingo	Team Foil
Silver medal – second place	2003 Santo Domingo	Individual Foil
Maccabiah Games
Silver medal – second place	2001 Israel	Team Foil
Silver medal – second place	2001 Israel	Team Epee

Jonathan Tiomkin (known as "Jon"; born July 12, 1979, in Brooklyn, New York) is an American Olympic foil fencer.

== Fencing career ==
=== High school ===
Tiomkin began fencing when he was a freshman at Hewlett High School in Hewlett, New York.

=== NCAA Championships ===
Fencing for St. John's University, Tiomkin won the bronze medal in foil at the 1999 NCAA Championships, and was a 1st-team All-American. In 2001 he came in 6th. He won the silver medal in 2002.

=== National competitions ===
Tiomkin won that national title in foil in 1999 and 2003, and placed second in 2004.

=== Pan American Games ===
At the 2003 Pan American Games, he won a gold medal in the team foil event and silver in individual foil.

=== World Championships ===
His individual results at the World Fencing Championships were 64th at the 2001 World Fencing Championships and 2003 World Fencing Championships, 52nd at the 2002 World Fencing Championships, and 45th at the 2006 World Fencing Championships. His best team result was 9th in 2003.

=== World Cup ===
Tiomkin won the bronze medal in the 2005 Shanghai World Cup.

=== Olympics ===
At the 2004 Summer Olympics, Tiomkin advanced to the round of 32, where he was defeated 3–15 by the number 1 seed, Andrea Cassarà of Italy. In the team foil event, the US team reached the semifinals, and finished in 4th place.

=== Maccabiah Games ===
Tiomkin, who is Jewish, fenced in the 2001 Maccabiah Games, winning team silver medals in épée and foil.

== Miscellaneous ==
- Tiomkin is a 2002 graduate of St. John's University, where he was a finance major.
- Tiomkin trains at the Fencers Club. His coaches are Simon Gershon and Mikhail Petin.
- He lives in New York City.
- Tiomkin owns and runs a fencing club in Hewlett, New York called the Five Towns Fencers Club.
- Tiomkin is the son of Reuven and Rebecca Tiomkin.
- Enjoys cliff-diving, skydiving, and pool diving.

== See also ==
- List of select Jewish fencers
- List of USFA Division I National Champions
