= Nontapat Panchan =

Thai fencer (born 1981)

Personal information
- Nationality: Thailand
- Born: 23 November 1981 (age 44) Bangkok, Thailand
- Height: 1.76 m (5 ft 9 1/2 in)
- Weight: 70 kg (154 lb)

Sport
- Sport: Fencing
- Event: Foil
- Club: Blade club
- Team: Thai team
Medal record
Men's fencing
Representing Thailand
Southeast Asian Games
Gold medal – first place	2001 Kuala Lumpur	Foil
Gold medal – first place	2003 Ho Chi Minh	Foil
Gold medal – first place	2005 Manila	Foil
Gold medal – first place	2011 Palembang	Foil
Gold medal – first place	2015 Singapore	Foil
Silver medal – second place	2007 Bangkok	Foil

Nontapat Panchan (Thai: นนทพัฒน์ ปานจันทร์; RTGS: Nonthaphat Panchan; born November 23, 1981, in Bangkok) is a Thai foil fencer. Panchan had won nine medals - 5 Golds and 1 Silver in Individual Men's Foil, 2 Golds, 1 Silver, and 1 Bronze in the Men's Team Foil event Southeast Asian Games 2001 in Kuala Lumpur, Malaysia, 2003 in Ho Chi Minh, Vietnam, 2005 in Manila, Philippines, 2007 in Bangkok, Thailand, 2011 in Palembang, Indonesia, and 2015 in Singapore. He is also a two-time NCAA champion (2002 and 2003). Nontapat graduated with an Economics Degree from Pennsylvania State University in State College, Pennsylvania, under a full scholarship grant.

Panchan represented Thailand at the 2008 Summer Olympics in Beijing, where he competed in the men's individual foil event. He lost the first preliminary round match to Poland's Sławomir Mocek, with a score of 7–15.

== See also ==
- List of Pennsylvania State University Olympians
- List of NCAA fencing champions
