= Kevin Ngan =

Hong Kong fencer (born 1983)

Medal record

Men's Fencing

Asian Games
| Bronze medal – third place | 2006 Doha | Foil Team |

Ngan Kwoon Yat Kevin (Chinese: 顏冠一; Jyutping: ngaan^{4} gun^{3} jat^{1}; born 18 October 1983) is a fencer from Hong Kong, China who won a bronze medal at both the 2006 Asian Games and the 2010 Asian Games in the men's foil team competition.
