= Lei Sheng =

Chinese foil fencer (born 1984)

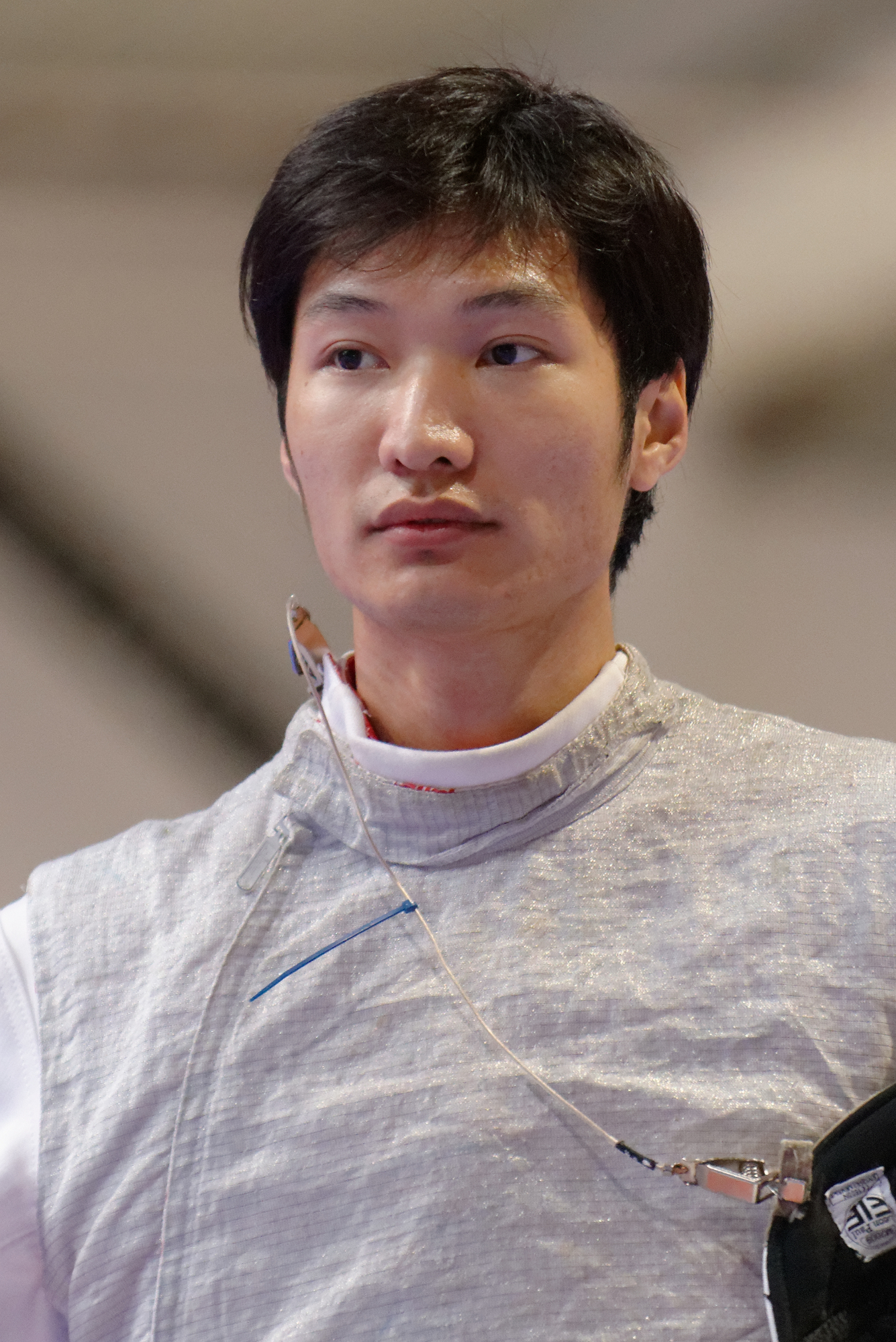
- Lei at the 2013 World Fencing Championships

Personal information
- Born: 7 March 1984 (age 42)
- Height: 1.92 m (6 ft 4 in)
- Weight: 78 kg (172 lb)

Fencing career
- Sport: Fencing
- Country: China
- Weapon: foil
- Hand: left-handed
- National coach: Wang Haibin
- FIE ranking: current ranking
Medal record
Olympic Games
Gold medal – first place	2012 London	Individual
World Championships
Gold medal – first place	2010 Paris	Team
Gold medal – first place	2011 Catania	Team
Silver medal – second place	2010 Paris	Individual
Silver medal – second place	2014 Kazan	Team
Bronze medal – third place	2006 Torino	Individual
Bronze medal – third place	2007 St. Petersburg	Individual
Universiade
Gold medal – first place	2011 Shenzhen	Team
Silver medal – second place	2011 Shenzhen	Individual
Asian Games
Gold medal – first place	2006 Doha	Team
Gold medal – first place	2010 Guangzhou	Team
Silver medal – second place	2014 Incheon	Team
Bronze medal – third place	2006 Doha	Individual
Bronze medal – third place	2010 Guangzhou	Individual

Lei Sheng (Chinese: 雷声; pinyin: Léi Shēng; born 7 March 1984) is a Chinese left-handed foil fencer, six-time team Asian champion, 2012 individual Asian champion, two-time team world champion, three-time Olympian, and 2012 individual Olympic champion.

== Career ==
Lei took up fencing because he liked Zorro. His results as a junior were unremarkable. The 2005–06 season saw his breakthrough: he climbed his first World Cup podium with a silver medal at La Coruña, followed by a victory at Espinho and a bronze medal at the Torino World Championships. He finished the season 5th in world rankings. In the following season he won the Bonn World Cup, the St Petersburg Grand Prix and the Montreal World Cup, along with a bronze medal in Venice. He placed third again in the World Championships after losing in the semifinals to Italy's Andrea Baldini.

He competed at the 2008 Beijing Olympics and was defeated in the quarter-finals by eventual gold medallist Benjamin Kleibrink. At the 2012 London Olympics, he won the gold medal in men's individual foil after defeating Egypt's Alaaeldin Abouelkassem with a score of 15–13.

Along with 2013 world champion Miles Chamley-Watson of the United States, Lei was named “athlete role model” for the Nanjing 2014 Youth Olympic Games. He was also chosen to bear the Chinese flag at the 2014 Asian Games and the 2016 Summer Olympics. Lei is the first ever Chinese Olympic athlete competing in a summer sport other than basketball to carry the Chinese flag in the opening ceremony.

== Medal Record ==
=== Olympic Games ===
Year	Location	Event	Position
2012	London, United Kingdom	Individual Men's Foil	1st

=== World Championship ===
Year	Location	Event	Position
2006	Turin, Italy	Individual Men's Foil	3rd
2007	St. Petersburg, Russia	Individual Men's Foil	3rd
2010	Paris, France	Individual Men's Foil	2nd
2010	Paris, France	Team Men's Foil	1st
2011	Catania, Italy	Team Men's Foil	1st
2014	Kazan, Russia	Team Men's Foil	2nd
2015	Moscow, Russia	Team Men's Foil	3rd

=== Asian Championship ===
Year	Location	Event	Position
2007	Nantong, China	Team Men's Foil	1st
2008	Bangkok, Thailand	Individual Men's Foil	3rd
2008	Bangkok, Thailand	Team Men's Foil	1st
2010	Seoul, South Korea	Individual Men's Foil	2nd
2010	Seoul, South Korea	Team Men's Foil	1st
2011	Seoul, South Korea	Team Men's Foil	1st
2012	Wakayama, Japan	Individual Men's Foil	1st
2012	Wakayama, Japan	Team Men's Foil	2nd
2013	Shanghai, China	Team Men's Foil	3rd
2014	Suwon, South Korea	Team Men's Foil	1st
2015	Singapore	Team Men's Foil	1st
2016	Wuxi, China	Individual Men's Foil	3rd
2016	Wuxi, China	Team Men's Foil	2nd

=== Grand Prix ===
Date	Location	Event	Position
03/09/2007	St. Petersburg, Russia	Individual Men's Foil	1st
06/08/2008	Havana, Cuba	Individual Men's Foil	3rd
01/29/2010	Paris, France	Individual Men's Foil	1st
02/19/2010	Venice, Italy	Individual Men's Foil	1st
05/24/2010	St. Petersburg, Russia	Individual Men's Foil	1st

=== World Cup ===
Date	Location	Event	Position
02/03/2006	A Coruña, Spain	Individual Men's Foil	2nd
05/13/2006	Espinho, Portugal	Individual Men's Foil	1st
03/03/2007	Bonn, Germany	Individual Men's Foil	1st
03/23/2007	Venice, Italy	Individual Men's Foil	3rd
05/31/2007	Montreal, Canada	Individual Men's Foil	1st
05/17/2008	Jeju, South Korea	Individual Men's Foil	3rd
02/06/2010	A Coruña, Spain	Individual Men's Foil	3rd
06/17/2011	Havana, Cuba	Individual Men's Foil	3rd

Olympic Games
Preceded by Yi Jianlian	Flagbearer for China; Rio de Janeiro 2016	Succeeded by Zhu Ting & Zhao Shuai
