= Ha Chang-duk =

South Korean fencer

Personal information
- Born: 5 February 1982 (age 44)

Sport
- Sport: Fencing

Ha Chang-duk (born 5 February 1982) is a South Korean fencer. He competed in the individual and team foil events at the 2004 Summer Olympics.
