= Yuki Ota =

Japanese fencer (born 1985)

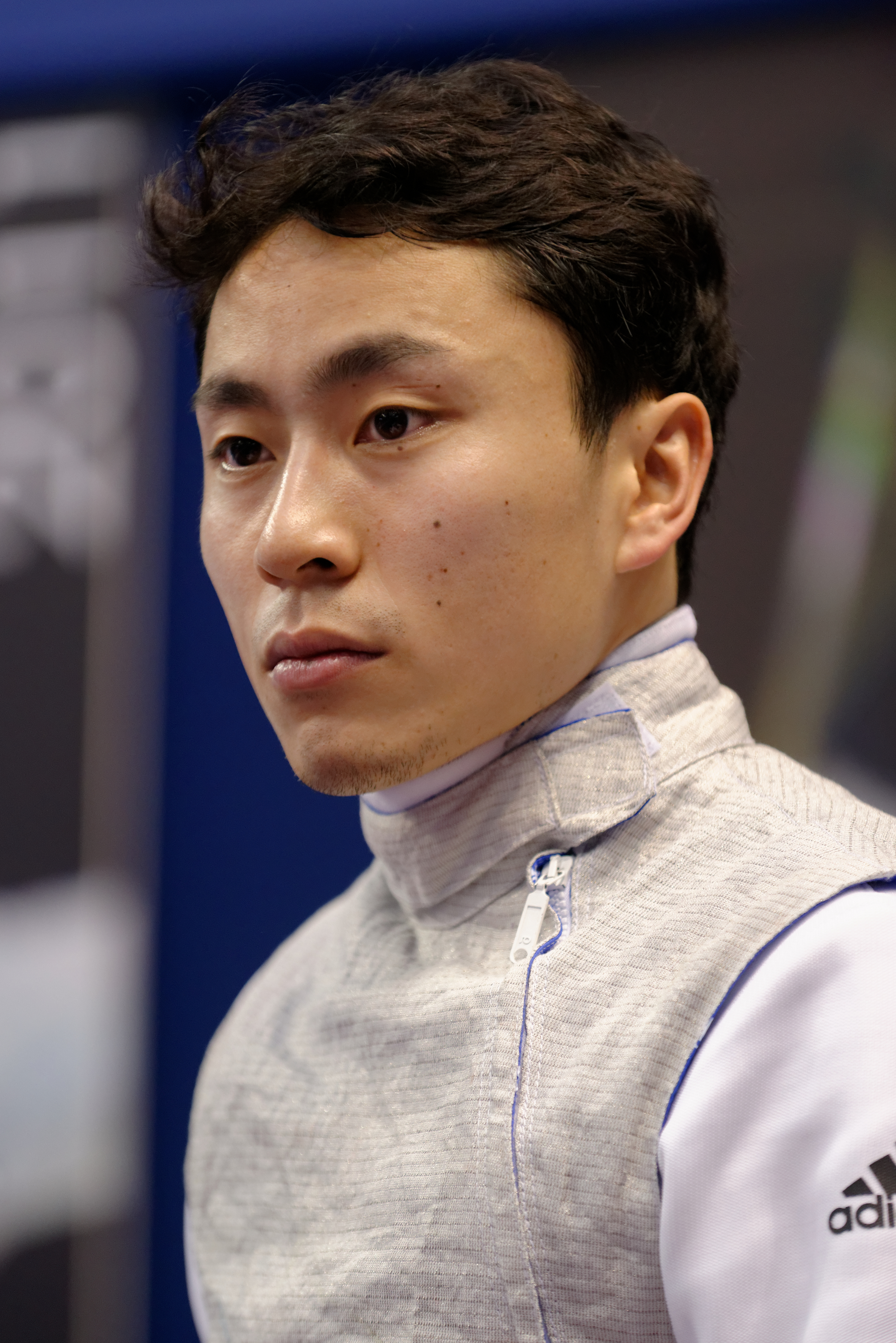
- Ota at the 2014 Paris World Cup

Personal information
- Full name: Yuki Ota
- Born: 25 November 1985 (age 40) Otsu, Shiga, Japan
- Height: 1.71 m (5 ft 7 1/2 in)
- Weight: 68 kg (150 lb; 10.7 st)

Fencing career
- Sport: Fencing
- Weapon: Foil
- Hand: right-handed
- National coach: Oleg Matseichuk
- FIE ranking: current ranking
Medal record
Olympic Games
Silver medal – second place	2008 Beijing	Individual
Silver medal – second place	2012 London	Team
World Championships
Gold medal – first place	2015 Moscow	Individual
Bronze medal – third place	2010 Paris	Individual
Bronze medal – third place	2010 Paris	Team
Asian Games
Gold medal – first place	2006 Doha	Individual
Silver medal – second place	2010 Guangzhou	Team
Bronze medal – third place	2006 Doha	Team
Bronze medal – third place	2010 Guangzhou	Individual
Bronze medal – third place	2014 Incheon	Individual

Yuki Ota (太田 雄貴, Ōta Yūki; born 25 November 1985) is a Japanese foil fencer, gold medallist at the 2006 Asian Games, silver medallist at the 2008 Summer Olympics, team silver medallist at the 2012 Summer Olympics, and individual gold medallist at the 2015 World Fencing Championships. He is a member of the International Olympic Committee (IOC).

== Career ==
Yuki took up fencing in his elementary school years at the instigation of his father, a Zorro fan and keen amateur fencer. He won the national junior high school championships. In Heian High School, he got third consecutive championship victories in national high school championships.

Ota climbed his first World Cup podium with a victory at the 2004 Tehran World Cup. He qualified for the 2004 Summer Olympics in Athens, his first Olympic participation, but was defeated in the table of 16 by Russia's Renal Ganeyev. He later explained he had felt completely overpowered: "It was on a whole other level. In F1 terms, it was like the finalists were equipped with completely different engines." Demotivated, he was taken over in world rankings by friend and rival Kenta Chida, whom he always used to beat, and contemplated giving up competition to take a regular job.

In 2006, Ota resumed training with Japan's national coach, Ukrainian Oleg Matseichuk, from whom he had always kept his distances before. He won a gold medal at the 2006 Asian Games in Doha and at the 2008 Asian Fencing Championships held in Bangkok.

In the 2008 Summer Olympics in Beijing, Ota reached the final of the men's individual foil held on 13 August 2008, by beating Germany's Peter Joppich 15–12 in the quarter-finals and Salvatore Sanzo 15–14 in the semifinals. He lost 15–9 to Benjamin Kleibrink in the final, thus winning the silver medal, Japan's first Olympic medal. He was then recruited by French club ASPTT Aix-en-Provence and took part in the team event of the 2009 French national championship along with Erwann Le Péchoux and Marcel Marcilloux. In the 2008–09 season, Ota moved to the top of the world rankings after finishing runner-up in the Moscow World Cup.

At the 2012 Summer Olympics, he lost in the third round of the individual foil competition, but won a silver medal in the team foil event. At the 2015 World Fencing Championships, he won gold in the Men's foil event, becoming the first Japanese to win a world championship in any event in fencing.

Ota graduated from Doshisha University. He is a member of the athletes commission of the International Fencing Federation.
