= Fencing at the 1996 Summer Olympics – Women's épée =

Fencing at the Olympics

Women's épée at the Games of the XXVI Olympiad
- Venue: Georgia World Congress Center
- Dates: 21 July 1996
- Competitors: 48 from 24 nations

Medalists
1st place, gold medalist(s)		Laura Flessel-Colovic	France
2nd place, silver medalist(s)		Valérie Barlois-Mevel-Leroux	France
3rd place, bronze medalist(s)		Gyöngyi Szalay-Horváth	Hungary

The women's épée was one of ten fencing events on the fencing at the 1996 Summer Olympics programme. It was the first appearance of the event. The competition was held on 21 July 1996. 48 fencers from 24 nations competed.

== Draw ==
=== Finals ===
Semifinals
Valérie Barlois-Mevel-Leroux (FRA)	15
Margherita Zalaffi (ITA)	6
Laura Flessel-Colovic (FRA)	15
Gyöngyi Szalay-Horváth (HUN)	10

Final
Valérie Barlois-Mevel-Leroux (FRA)	12
Laura Flessel-Colovic (FRA)	15
Bronze medal match
Gyöngyi Szalay-Horváth (HUN)	15
Margherita Zalaffi (ITA)	13

=== Section 1 ===
Round of 64
Kim Hui-Jeong (KOR)	15
Nhi Lan Le (USA)	13
Mariya Mazina (RUS)	15
Mitch Escanellas (PUR)	11
Helena Elinder (SWE)	15
Minna Lehtola (FIN)	8
Mirayda García (CUB)	15
Yuko Arai (JPN)	13

Round of 32
Tímea Nagy (HUN)	15
Kim Hui-Jeong (KOR)	5
Mariya Mazina (RUS)	15
Elisa Uga (ITA)	9
Valérie Barlois-Mevel-Leroux (FRA)	15
Helena Elinder (SWE)	3
Mirayda García (CUB)	11
Gianna Hablützel-Bürki (SUI)	15

Round of 16
Tímea Nagy (HUN)	15
Elisa Uga (ITA)	9
Valérie Barlois-Mevel-Leroux (FRA)	15
Gianna Hablützel-Bürki (SUI)	14

Quarterfinals
Tímea Nagy (HUN)	9
Valérie Barlois-Mevel-Leroux (FRA)	15

=== Section 2 ===
Round of 64
Yan Jing (CHN)	15
Noriko Kubo (JPN)	10
Yeva Vybornova (UKR)	15
Mariette Schmit (LUX)	8
Karina Aznavuryan (RUS)	15
Nanae Tanaka (JPN)	5
Niki-Katerina Sidiropoulou (GRE)	15
Sarah Osvath (AUS)	8

Round of 32
Sophie Moressée-Pichot (FRA)	15
Yan Jing (CHN)	14
Yeva Vybornova (UKR)	7
Eva-Maria Ittner (GER)	15
Margherita Zalaffi (ITA)	15
Karina Aznavuryan (RUS)	12
Niki-Katerina Sidiropoulou (GRE)	10
Claudia Bokel (GER)	15

Round of 16
Sophie Moressée-Pichot (FRA)	10
Eva-Maria Ittner (GER)	15
Margherita Zalaffi (ITA)	15
Claudia Bokel (GER)	8

Quarterfinals
Eva-Maria Ittner (GER)	10
Margherita Zalaffi (ITA)	15

=== Section 3 ===
Round of 64
Laura Chiesa (ITA)	15
Elaine Cheris (USA)	13
Joanna Jakimiuk (POL)	15
Henda Zaouali (TUN)	7
Heidi Rohi (EST)	15
Sandra Kenel (SUI)	14
Lee Geum-Nam (KOR)	15
Milagros Palma (CUB)	12

Round of 32
Laura Flessel-Colovic (FRA)	15
Laura Chiesa (ITA)	10
Joanna Jakimiuk (POL)	4
Viktoriya Titova (UKR)	15
Katja Nass (GER)	15
Heidi Rohi (EST)	12
Lee Geum-Nam (KOR)	9
Adrienn Hormay (HUN)	15

Round of 16
Laura Flessel-Colovic (FRA)	15
Viktoriya Titova (UKR)	11
Katja Nass (GER)	9
Adrienn Hormay (HUN)	15

Quarterfinals
Laura Flessel-Colovic (FRA)	15
Adrienn Hormay (HUN)	12

=== Section 4 ===
Round of 64
Go Jeong-Jeon (KOR)	15
Tamara Esteri (CUB)	12
Leslie Marx (USA)	15
Michèle Wolf (SUI)	14
Eva Fjellerup (DEN)	15
Rosa María Castillejo (ESP)	13
Yuliya Garayeva (RUS)	15
Tamara Savić-Šotra (SCG)	7

Round of 32
Taymi Chappé (ESP)	12
Go Jeong-Jeon (KOR)	15
Leslie Marx (USA)	15
Maarika Võsu (EST)	13
Oksana Yermakova (EST)	15
Eva Fjellerup (DEN)	14
Yuliya Garayeva (RUS)	14
Gyöngyi Szalay-Horváth (HUN)	15

Round of 16
Go Jeong-Jeon (KOR)	15
Leslie Marx (USA)	12
Oksana Yermakova (EST)	6
Gyöngyi Szalay-Horváth (HUN)	15

Quarterfinals
Go Jeong-Jeon (KOR)	5
Gyöngyi Szalay-Horváth (HUN)	15

== Results ==
Rank	Fencer	Country
1st place, gold medalist(s)	Laura Flessel-Colovic	France
2nd place, silver medalist(s)	Valérie Barlois-Mevel-Leroux	France
3rd place, bronze medalist(s)	Gyöngyi Szalay-Horváth	Hungary
4	Margherita Zalaffi	Italy
5	Tímea Nagy	Hungary
6	Adrienn Hormay	Hungary
7	Eva-Maria Ittner	Germany
8	Go Jeong-Jeon	South Korea
9	Claudia Bokel	Germany
10	Sophie Moressée-Pichot	France
11	Gianna Hablützel-Bürki	Switzerland
12	Katja Nass	Germany
13	Viktoriya Titova	Ukraine
14	Elisa Uga	Italy
15	Oksana Yermakova	Estonia
16	Leslie Marx	United States
17	Taymi Chappé	Spain
18	Maarika Võsu	Estonia
19	Mariya Mazina	Russia
20	Karina Aznavuryan	Russia
21	Joanna Jakimiuk	Poland
22	Heidi Rohi	Estonia
23	Yeva Vybornova	Ukraine
24	Mirayda García	Cuba
25	Yan Jing	China
26	Laura Chiesa	Italy
27	Niki-Katerina Sidiropoulou	Greece
28	Kim Hui-Jeong	South Korea
29	Yuliya Garayeva	Russia
30	Lee Geum-Nam	South Korea
31	Helena Elinder	Sweden
32	Eva Fjellerup	Denmark
33	Rosa María Castillejo	Spain
34	Minna Lehtola	Finland
35	Milagros Palma	Cuba
36	Tamara Savić-Šotra	FR Yugoslavia
37	Nhi Lan Le	United States
38	Sarah Osvath	Australia
39	Elaine Cheris	United States
40	Noriko Kubo	Japan
41	Tamara Esteri	Cuba
42	Yuko Arai	Japan
43	Michèle Wolf	Switzerland
44	Mariette Schmit	Luxembourg
45	Sandra Kenel	Switzerland
46	Nanae Tanaka	Japan
47	Mitch Escanellas	Puerto Rico
48	Henda Zaouali	Tunisia
