= Fencing at the 1996 Summer Olympics – Women's team épée =

Fencing at the Olympics

Women's team épée at the Games of the XXVI Olympiad
- Venue: Georgia World Congress Center
- Dates: 24 July 1996
- Competitors: 33 from 11 nations

Medalists
1st place, gold medalist(s)		Laura Flessel-Colovic; Sophie Moressée-Pichot; Valérie Barlois-Mevel-Leroux	France
2nd place, silver medalist(s)		Elisa Uga; Laura Chiesa; Margherita Zalaffi	Italy
3rd place, bronze medalist(s)		Karina Aznavuryan; Mariya Mazina; Yuliya Garayeva	Russia

The women's team épée was one of ten fencing events on the fencing at the 1996 Summer Olympics programme. It was the first appearance of the event. The competition was held on 24 July 1996. 33 fencers from 11 nations competed.

== Brackets ==
1/16
08:30
Hungary
bye
08:30
United States	45
South Korea	44
08:30
Italy
bye
08:30
Estonia
bye
08:30
Germany
bye
08:30
Russia	45
Japan	33
08:30
France
bye
08:30
Cuba	45
Switzerland	39

Quarterfinals
10:00
Hungary	45
United States	25
10:00
Italy	45
Estonia	38
10:00
Russia	45
Germany	37
10:00
France	45
Cuba	35

Semifinals
11:25
Hungary	32
Italy	45
11:25
Russia	39
France	45

Gold medal final
19:50
Italy	33
France	45
Bronze medal final
18:30
Hungary	44
Russia	45

== Rosters ==
Cuba - 6th place

- Milagros Palma
- Mirayda García
- Tamara Esteri

Estonia - 5th place

- Heidi Rohi
- Maarika Võsu
- Oksana Yermakova

France

- Laura Flessel-Colovic
- Sophie Moressée-Pichot
- Valérie Barlois-Mevel-Leroux

Germany - 7th place

- Claudia Bokel
- Eva-Maria Ittner
- Katja Nass

Hungary - 4th place

- Adrienn Hormay
- Gyöngyi Szalay-Horváth
- Tímea Nagy

Italy

- Elisa Uga
- Laura Chiesa
- Margherita Zalaffi

Japan - 11th place

- Nanae Tanaka
- Noriko Kubo
- Yuko Arai

Russia

- Karina Aznavuryan
- Mariya Mazina
- Yuliya Garayeva

South Korea - 10th place

- Kim Hui-Jeong
- Go Jeong-Jeon
- Lee Geum-Nam

Switzerland - 9th place

- Gianna Hablützel-Bürki
- Michèle Wolf
- Sandra Kenel

United States - 8th place

- Elaine Cheris
- Leslie Marx
- Nhi Lan Le
