= 1993 World Fencing Championships =

International fencing competition

1993 World Championships in Fencing
- Dates: July 1–11
- Host city: Essen, Germany

The 1993 World Fencing Championships were held from 1 July to 11 July 1993 in Essen, Germany.

== Medal summary ==
=== Men's events ===
Event	Gold	Silver	Bronze
Individual Épée	(Russia) Pavel Kolobkov	(Germany) Arnd Schmitt	(Hungary) Ivan Kovacs (Spain) Fernando de la Peña
Individual Foil	(Germany) Alexander Koch	(Ukraine) Sergei Golubitsky	(France) Philippe Omnès (Germany) Uwe Romer
Individual Sabre	(Russia) Grigory Kiriyenko	(Hungary) Bence Szabó	(Italy) Tohni Terenzi (Germany) Steffen Wiesinger
Team Épée	Italy; Sandro Cuomo; Maurizio Randazzo; Angelo Mazzoni; Stefano Pantano; Paolo Milanoli	France; Jean-Michel Henry; Éric Srecki; Robert Leroux; Hervé Faget; Rémy Delhomme	Germany; Arnd Schmitt; Elmar Borrmann; Uwe Proske; Marius Strzalka; Patrick Draenert
Team Foil	Germany; Alexander Koch; Uwe Romer; Udo Wagner; Thorsten Weidner; Ingo Weissenborn	Italy; Alessandro Puccini; Stefano Cerioni; Andrea Borella; Luca Vitalesta; Francesco Rossi	Poland; Marian Sypniewski; Joachim Wendt; Ryszard Sobczak; Leszek Bandach; Piotr Kiełpikowski; Adam Krzesinski
Team Sabre	Hungary; Bence Szabó; József Navarrete; Csaba Köves; György Boros; Péter Abay	Italy; Tohni Terenzi; Marco Marin; Giovanni Scalzo; Giovanni Sirovich; Raffaello Caserta	Germany; Steffen Wiesinger; Frank Bleckmann; Felix Becker; Uli Eifler; Jacek Huchwajda

=== Women's events ===
Event	Gold	Silver	Bronze
Individual Épée	(Estonia) Oksana Jermakova	(Italy) Laura Chiesa	(Sweden) Helena Elinder (France) Sophie Moressée
Individual Foil	(Italy) Francesca Bortolozzi	(Hungary) Aida Mohamed	(Germany) Simone Bauer (Germany) Zita Funkenhauser
Team Épée	Hungary; Gyöngyi Szalay; Mariann Horváth; Tímea Nagy; Hajnalka Király; Marina Várkonyi	Germany; Katja Nass; Hedwig Funkenhauser; Claudia Bokel; Imke Duplitzer; Eva-Maria Ittner	Ukraine; Alla Mironyuk; Gulie Tuhtarova; Viktoriya Titova; Anna Garina
Team Foil	Germany; Simone Bauer; Zita Funkenhauser; Anja Fichtel-Mauritz; Sabine Bau; Monika Weber	Romania; Laura Badea; Elisabeta Tufan; Mioara David; Claudia Grigorescu; Reka Szabo-Lazar	Italy; Francesca Bortolozzi; Valentina Vezzali; Diana Bianchedi; Giovanna Trillini; Margherita Zalaffi

== Medal table ==
* Host nation (Germany)

Rank	Nation	Gold	Silver	Bronze	Total
1	Germany (GER)*	3	2	6	11
2	Italy (ITA)	2	3	2	7
3	Hungary (HUN)	2	2	1	5
4	Russia (RUS)	2	0	0	2
5	Estonia (EST)	1	0	0	1
6	France (FRA)	0	1	2	3
7	Ukraine (UKR)	0	1	1	2
8	Romania (ROU)	0	1	0	1
9	Poland (POL)	0	0	1	1
9	Spain (ESP)	0	0	1	1
9	Sweden (SWE)	0	0	1	1
Totals (11 entries)		10	10	15	35
