= 1997 World Fencing Championships =

International fencing competition

1997 World Championships in Fencing
- Dates: 13–19 July
- Host city: Cape Town, South Africa

The 1997 World Fencing Championships were held from 13 July to 19 July 1997 in Cape Town, South Africa at the newly constructed Foreshore Exhibition Centre.

== Medal summary ==
=== Men's events ===
Event	Gold	Silver	Bronze
Individual épée	(France) Éric Srecki	(Russia) Pavel Kolobkov	(Poland) Robert Andrzejuk (France) Robert Leroux
Individual foil	(Ukraine) Sergei Golubitsky	(South Korea) Kim Young-ho	(China) Wang Haibin (France) Lionel Plumenail
Individual sabre	(Russia) Stanislav Pozdnyakov	(Italy) Luigi Tarantino	(Poland) Rafal Sznajder (France) Damien Touya
Team épée	Cuba; Nelson Loyola Torriente; Iván Trevejo Perez; Carlos Pedroso	Germany; Arnd Schmitt; Michael Flegler; Mark Steifensand; Elmar Borrmann	Italy; Angelo Mazzoni; Sandro Cuomo; Alfredo Rota; Maurizio Randazzo
Team foil	France; Lionel Plumenail; Olivier Lambert; Franck Boidin; Laurent Bel	Cuba; Rolando Tuckers Leon; Oscar García Pérez; Elvis Gregory Gil; Ignacio González	Italy; Daniele Crosta; Alessandro Puccini; Stefano Cerioni; Salvatore Sanzo
Team sabre	France; Damien Touya; Jean-Philippe Daurelle; Gaël Touya; Matthieu Gourdain	Russia; Stanislav Pozdnyakov; Sergey Sharikov; Grigory Kiriyenko; Aleksandr Shirshov	Hungary; Domonkos Ferjancsik; József Navarrete; György Boros; Csaba Köves

=== Women's events ===
Event	Gold	Silver	Bronze
Individual épée	(Cuba) Mirayda García Soto	(Cuba) Zuleydis Ortiz	(Spain) Taymi Chappé (Hungary) Gyöngyi Szalay
Individual foil	(Italy) Giovanna Trillini	(Germany) Sabine Bau	(Italy) Diana Bianchedi (Germany) Monika Weber
Team épée	Hungary; Gyöngyi Szalay; Adrienn Hormay; Tímea Nagy; Hajnalka Király	Germany; Imke Duplitzer; Claudia Bokel; Katja Nass; Eva-Maria Ittner	France; Laura Flessel-Colovic; Sophie Moressée-Pichot; Valérie Barlois; Elsa Girardot
Team foil	Italy; Giovanna Trillini; Diana Bianchedi; Valentina Vezzali; Annamaria Giacometti	Romania; Laura Badea; Reka Szabo-Lazar; Roxana Scarlat; Mioara David	Germany; Sabine Bau; Monika Weber; Rita Koenig; Gesine Schiel

== Medal table ==
Rank	Nation	Gold	Silver	Bronze	Total
1	France (FRA)	3	0	4	7
2	Cuba (CUB)	2	2	0	4
3	Italy (ITA)	2	1	3	6
4	Russia (RUS)	1	2	0	3
5	Hungary (HUN)	1	0	2	3
6	Ukraine (UKR)	1	0	0	1
7	Germany (GER)	0	3	2	5
8	Romania (ROU)	0	1	0	1
8	South Korea (KOR)	0	1	0	1
10	Poland (POL)	0	0	2	2
11	China (CHN)	0	0	1	1
11	Spain (ESP)	0	0	1	1
Totals (12 entries)		10	10	15	35
