= 1999 World Fencing Championships =

International fencing competition

1999 World Championships in Fencing
- Dates: November 1 – 8
- Host city: Seoul, South Korea

The 1999 World Fencing Championships were held in Seoul, South Korea. The event took place from November 1 to November 8, 1999. It was the first Fencing World Championship in which individual and team women's sabre competitions were held.

== Medal summary ==
=== Men's events ===
Event	Gold	Silver	Bronze
Individual Épée	(Germany) Arnd Schmitt	(Sweden) Peter Vanky	(Russia) Pavel Kolobkov (Estonia) Kaido Kaaberma
Individual Foil	(Ukraine) Sergei Golubitsky	(Italy) Matteo Zennaro	(Germany) Wolfgang Wienand (South Korea) Kim Young-Ho
Individual Sabre	(France) Damien Touya	(Russia) Stanislav Pozdnyakov	(France) Jean-Phillippe Daurelle (Italy) Luigi Tarantino
Team Épée	France; Jean-François Di Martino; Eric Srecki; Hugues Obry; Rémy Delhomme	Germany; Arnd Schmitt; Marc-Konstantin Steifensand; Jörg Fiedler; Elmar Borrmann	Cuba; Iván Trevejo; Carlos Pedroso; Nilson Loyola Torriente; Camilo Boris
Team Foil	France; Lionel Plumenail; Patrice Lhotellier; Jean-Noël Ferrari; Jean-Yves Robin	China; Wang Haibin; Ye Chong; Zhang Jie; Dong Zhaozhi	Poland; Adam Krzesinski; Piotr Kielpikowski; Slawomir Mocek; Wojciech Szuchnicki
Team Sabre	France; Damien Touya; Jean-Phillippe Daurelle; Matthieu Gourdain; Julien Pillet	Poland; Marcin Sobala; Norbert Jaskot; Rafal Sznajder; Arkadiusz Nowinowski	Russia; Stanislav Pozdnyakov; Aleksey Frosin; Sergey Sharikov; Aleksey Dyachenko

=== Women's events ===
Event	Gold	Silver	Bronze
Individual Épée	(France) Laura Flessel-Colovic	(Switzerland) Diana Romagnoli	(Hungary) Ildikó Mincza (Cuba) Miraida Garcia-Soto
Individual Foil	(Italy) Valentina Vezzali	(Germany) Sabine Bau	(United States) Iris Zimmermann (Russia) Svetlana Boyko
Individual Sabre	(Azerbaijan) Yelena Jemayeva	(Italy) Ilaria Bianco	(France) Ève Pouteil-Noble (Italy) Anna Ferraro
Team Épée	Hungary; Ildikó Mincza; Gyöngyi Szalay; Hajnalka Tóth; Tímea Nagy	China; Yang Shaogi; Liang Qin; Li Na	Germany; Imke Duplitzer; Claudia Bokel; Kristina Ophardt; Katja Nass
Team Foil	Germany; Sabine Bau; Monika Weber; Gesine Schiel; Simone Bauer	Poland; Sylwia Gruchala; Barbara Wolnicka; Magdalena Mroczkiewicz; Alicja Kryczalo	China; Xiao Aihua; Meng Jie; Yuan Li; Shi Haiying
Team Sabre	Italy; Ilaria Bianco; Anna Ferraro; Alessia Tognolli; Daniela Colaiacomo	France; Ève Pouteil-Noble; Cécile Argiolas; Anne-Lise Touya; Magalie Carrier	Azerbaijan; Yelena Jemayeva; Anjela Volkova; Tatiana Diachenko

== Medal table ==
* Host nation (South Korea)

Rank	Nation	Gold	Silver	Bronze	Total
1	France (FRA)	5	1	2	8
2	Germany (GER)	2	2	2	6
2	Italy (ITA)	2	2	2	6
4	Azerbaijan (AZE)	1	0	1	2
4	Hungary (HUN)	1	0	1	2
6	Ukraine (UKR)	1	0	0	1
7	China (CHN)	0	2	1	3
7	Poland (POL)	0	2	1	3
9	Russia (RUS)	0	1	3	4
10	Sweden (SWE)	0	1	0	1
10	Switzerland (SUI)	0	1	0	1
12	Cuba (CUB)	0	0	2	2
13	Estonia (EST)	0	0	1	1
13	South Korea (KOR)*	0	0	1	1
13	United States (USA)	0	0	1	1
Totals (15 entries)		12	12	18	42
