= 1994 World Fencing Championships =

International fencing competition

1994 World Championships in Fencing
- Dates: July 3 – 8
- Host city: Athens, Greece

The 1994 World Fencing Championships were held from 3 July to 8 July 1994 in Athens, Greece.

== Medal summary ==
=== Men's events ===
| Event | Gold | Silver | Bronze |
|---|---|---|---|
| Individual épée | (Russia) Pavel Kolobkov | (Switzerland) Olivier Jacquet | (Germany) Arnd Schmitt (France) Jean-Michel Henry |
| Individual foil | (Cuba) Rolando Tucker | (Italy) Alessandro Puccini | (Cuba) Oscar García (Germany) Thorsten Weidner |
| Individual sabre | (Germany) Felix Becker | (Russia) Stanislav Pozdnyakov | (Hungary) Bence Szabó (Russia) Grigori Kirienko |
| Team épée | France; Jean-Michel Henry; Robert Leroux; Éric Srecki; Hervé Faget | Germany; Arnd Schmitt; Elmar Borrmann; Michael Flegler; Mariusz Strzalka | South Korea; Lee Sang-yup; Lee Sang-ki; Yoon Won-jin; Ku Kyo-dong |
| Team foil | Italy; Alessandro Puccini; Andrea Borella; Stefano Cerioni; Marco Arpino | Germany; Thorsten Weidner; Alexander Köch; Udo Wagner; Uwe Roemer | China; Ye Chong; Dong Zhaozhi; Wang Lihong; Wang Haibin |
| Team sabre | Russia; Stanislav Pozdnyakov; Grigory Kiriyenko; Aleksey Yermolayev; Aleksandr Shirshov | Hungary; Bence Szabó; Csaba Köves; József Navarrete; György Boros | Romania; Vilmoș Szabo; Daniel Grigore; Florin Lupeică; Victor Găureanu |

=== Women's events ===
| Event | Gold | Silver | Bronze |
|---|---|---|---|
| Individual épée | (Italy) Laura Chiesa | (Germany) Katja Nass | (Italy) Corinna Panzeri (Finland) Minna Lehtola |
| Individual foil | (Romania) Reka Lazăr-Szabo | (Italy) Valentina Vezzali | (Italy) Francesca Bortolozzi (France) Laurence Modaine |
| Team épée | Spain; Taymi Chappé; Carmen Ruiz Hervias; Cristiana Vargas; Rosa Castillejo | Hungary; Hajnalka Kiraly; Gyöngyi Szalay; Mariann Horváth; Adrienn Hormay | Poland; Dominika Butkiewicz; Dorota Slominska; Magdalena Jeziorowska; Joanna Jakimiuk |
| Team foil | Romania; Reka Lazăr-Szabo; Laura Badea; Claudia Grigorescu; Elisabeta Tufan | Italy; Valentina Vezzali; Francesca Bortolozzi; Diana Bianchedi; Giovanna Trillini | Hungary; Gabriella Lantos; Aida Mohamed; Zsuzsa Jánosi; Ildikó Mincza |

== Medal table ==
| Rank | Nation | Gold | Silver | Bronze | Total |
|---|---|---|---|---|---|
| 1 | Italy (ITA) | 2 | 3 | 2 | 7 |
| 2 | Russia (RUS) | 2 | 1 | 1 | 4 |
| 3 | Romania (ROU) | 2 | 0 | 1 | 3 |
| 4 | Germany (GER) | 1 | 3 | 2 | 6 |
| 5 | France (FRA) | 1 | 0 | 2 | 3 |
| 6 | Cuba (CUB) | 1 | 0 | 1 | 2 |
| 7 | Spain (ESP) | 1 | 0 | 0 | 1 |
| 8 | Hungary (HUN) | 0 | 2 | 2 | 4 |
| 9 | Switzerland (SUI) | 0 | 1 | 0 | 1 |
| 10 | China (CHN) | 0 | 0 | 1 | 1 |
| 10 | Finland (FIN) | 0 | 0 | 1 | 1 |
| 10 | Poland (POL) | 0 | 0 | 1 | 1 |
| 10 | South Korea (KOR) | 0 | 0 | 1 | 1 |
| Totals (13 entries) | | 10 | 10 | 15 | 35 |
