= 2002 World Fencing Championships =

World fencing championship in Portugal

2002 World Championships in Fencing
- Dates: August 18 – August 23
- Host city: Lisbon, Portugal

The 2002 World Fencing Championships were held in Lisbon, Portugal. The event took place from August 18 to August 23, 2002.

== Overview ==
Lisbon obtained the right to organize the championships over Bari, Italy. The event was first to take place from August 12 to August 18, but was reported a week later at the request of the main sponsor and of the television stations, which feared poor audience figures.

84 countries–a record at the time–took part in the championships. The competition saw the clear domination of Russia, who came away with nine medals, including six golds. Stanislav Pozdniakov and Svetlana Boyko obtained a double gold haul respectively in men's sabre and women's foil. Boiko shared the podium with teammate Yekaterina Yusheva, who in quarter-finals had put an end to Valentina Vezzali's streak of gold medals in 1999, 2000, and 2001. Pavel Kolobkov earned a gold medal in men's épée, eight years after his last major title and with a very limited preparation: he was then working as a fencing coach in Boston and rarely took part in Fencing World Cup events. Russia also prevailed in women's team sabre, overcoming Hungary in the final. Ironically, these two countries were the most adamant against the introduction of women's sabre at the Olympics.

The Lisbon championships proved however a disappointment for France, whose medals tally dropped from ten at Nîmes 2001 to five. The French preparation for the championships had been affected by a personal conflict between Philippe Omnès, director of fencing of the French federation, and Christian Bauer, national coach for sabre, as well as the positive drugs test of Laura Flessel-Colovic a few days before the competition. France boasted only one gold medal in men's team épée, won against Russia.

The remaining medals were relatively spread out between other nations. Romania claimed three bronze medals: one in women's team foil, Laura Badea's first medal after her return from maternity leave, one in men's sabre for Olympic champion Mihai Covaliu and one in women's épée for 17-year-old Ana Maria Brânză. The main surprise however was the growing power of Asian fencing: Korea's Hyun Hee defeated successively favourites Laura Flessel and Imke Duplitzer to earn the gold in women's épée, while China's Tan Xue claimed the title after seeing of previous incumbents Anne-Lise Touya and Elena Jemayeva.

== Medal table ==
Rank	Nation	Gold	Silver	Bronze	Total
1	Russia (RUS)	6	2	1	9
2	France (FRA)	1	3	1	5
3	Germany (GER)	1	2	2	5
4	Hungary (HUN)	1	1	2	4
5	Italy (ITA)	1	1	1	3
6	China (CHN)	1	0	2	3
6	South Korea (KOR)	1	0	2	3
8	Azerbaijan (AZE)	0	1	1	2
8	Poland (POL)	0	1	1	2
10	Estonia (EST)	0	1	0	1
11	Romania (ROU)	0	0	3	3
12	Belarus (BLR)	0	0	1	1
12	Spain (ESP)	0	0	1	1
Totals (13 entries)		12	12	18	42

== Medal summary ==
=== Men's events ===
Event	Gold	Silver	Bronze
Épée	(Russia) Pavel Kolobkov	(France) Fabrice Jeannet	(South Korea) Ku Kyo-dong (Belarus) Vitaly Zakharov
Foil	(Italy) Simone Vanni	(Germany) Andre Wessels	(Poland) Piotr Kielpikowski (China) Wu Hanxiong
Sabre	(Russia) Stanislav Pozdnyakov	(France) Julien Pillet	(Romania) Mihai Covaliu (Italy) Luigi Tarantino
Team Épée	France; Benoît Janvier; Fabrice Jeannet; Jean-Michel Lucenay; Hugues Obry	Russia; Pavel Kolobkov; Sergey Kochetkov; Aleksey Selin; Vyacheslav Selin	South Korea; Gu Gyo-Dong; Kim Jeong-Gwan; Lee Sang-Yeop; Yang Roy-Sung
Team Foil	Germany; Ralf Bißdorf; Dominik Behr; André Weßels; Lars Schache	France; Brice Guyart; Loïc Attely; Jean-Noël Ferrari; Franck Boidin	Spain; Javier Menéndez; Luis Caplliure; José Francisco Guerra; Javier García Delgado
Team Sabre	Russia; Aleksey Dyachenko; Aleksey Yakimenko; Stanislav Pozdniakov; Sergey Sharikov	Italy; Giampiero Pastore; Giacomo Guidi; Aldo Montano; Luigi Tarantino	Germany; Dennis Bauer; Michael Herm; Harald Stehr; Alexander Weber

=== Women's events ===
Event	Gold	Silver	Bronze
Épée	(South Korea) Hyun Hee	(Germany) Imke Duplitzer	(Romania) Ana Maria Brânză (Germany) Britta Heidemann
Foil	(Russia) Svetlana Boyko	(Russia) Yekaterina Yusheva	(Hungary) Edina Knapek (Hungary) Aida Mohamed
Sabre	(China) Tan Xue	(Azerbaijan) Yelena Jemayeva	(France) Cécile Argiolas (Russia) Yelena Nechayeva
Team Épée	Hungary; Hajnalka Kiraly; Tímea Nagy; Hajnalka Tóth	Estonia; Maarika Võsu; Irina Embrich; Olga Aleksejeva; Heidi Rohi	China; Luo Xiaojuan; Li Na; Shen Weiwei; Zhong Weiping
Team Foil	Russia; Svetlana Boyko; Yekaterina Yusheva; Julia Khakimova; Olga Lobyntseva	Poland; Sylwia Gruchała; Magdalena Mroczkiewicz; Anna Rybicka; Małgorzata Wojtkowiak	Romania; Laura Badea; Roxana Scarlat; Cristina Stahl; Reka Szabo
Team Sabre	Russia; Yelena Nechayeva; Margarita Zhukova; Irina Bazhenova; Natalia Makeyeva	Hungary; Edina Csaba; Orsolya Nagy; Annamária Nagy; Gabriella Sznopek	Azerbaijan; Yelena Amirova; Yelena Jemayeva; Anzhela Volkova; Yana Siukayeva

== Sources ==
- FIE Results
- Ottogalli, Cécile; Six, Gérard; Terret, Thierry (2010). Un pour tous, tous pour un. L'histoire des championnats du monde d'escrime. Paris: Le Cherche Midi. p. 31–4. ISBN 978-2-7491-1372-2. WCH.
- Safra, Jean-Marie (2002). "The Russian flag flew over Lisbon". Escrime Internationale (41): 25–9. FIE.
