= 1995 World Fencing Championships =

International fencing competition

1995 World Championships in Fencing
- Dates: July 18 – 23
- Host city: The Hague, Netherlands

The 1995 World Fencing Championships were held from 18 July to 23 July 1995 in The Hague, Netherlands.

== Medal summary ==
=== Men's events ===
Event	Gold	Silver	Bronze
Individual Épée	(France) Éric Srecki	(France) Robert Leroux	(Italy) Sandro Cuomo (Colombia) Mauricio Rivas Nieto
Individual Foil	(Russia) Dmitriy Shevchenko	(Spain) José Francisco Guerra	(Cuba) Elvis Gregory Gil (Ukraine) Sergei Golubitsky
Individual Sabre	(Russia) Grigory Kiriyenko	(Germany) Felix Becker	(Italy) Luigi Tarantino (Italy) Tohni Terenzi
Team Épée	Germany; Arnd Schmitt; Michael Flegler; Mariusz Strzalka; Elmar Borrmann	France; Éric Srecki; Robert Leroux; Jean-Michel Henry; Hugues Obry	Hungary; Géza Imre; Iván Kovács; Attila Fekete; Krisztián Kulcsár
Team Foil	Cuba; Elvis Gregory Gil; Roland Tucker Leon; Oscar Garcia Perez; Ignacio Gonzalez	Russia; Dmitriy Shevchenko; Ilgar Mammadov; Anvar Ibraguimov; Vladislav Pavlovich	Poland; Ryszard Sobczak; Piotr Kielpikowski; Jaroslaw Rodzewicz; Adam Krzesinski
Team Sabre	Italy; Luigi Tarantino; Tohni Terenzi; Raffaello Caserta; Marco Marin	Russia; Grigory Kiriyenko; Stanislav Pozdnyakov; Sergey Sharikov; Aleksandr Shirshov	Hungary; György Boros; József Navarrete; Csaba Köves; Bence Szabó

=== Women's events ===
Event	Gold	Silver	Bronze
Individual Épée	(Poland) Joanna Jakimiuk	(Hungary) Gyöngyi Szalay	(France) Laura Flessel-Colovic (France) Sophie Moressée-Pichot
Individual Foil	(Romania) Laura Badea	(Italy) Giovanna Trillini	(Italy) Valentina Vezzali (Italy) Diana Bianchedi
Team Épée	Hungary; Gyöngyi Szalay; Tímea Nagy; Adrienn Hormay; Hajnalka Kiraly	France; Laura Flessel-Colovic; Sophie Moressée-Pichot; Valérie Barlois; Sangita Tripathi	Estonia; Maarika Võsu; Merle Esken; Oksana Jermakova; Heidi Rohi
Team Foil	Italy; Giovanna Trillini; Valentina Vezzali; Diana Bianchedi; Francesca Bortolozzi	Romania; Laura Badea; Claudia Grigorescu; Reka Szabo; Elisabeta Tufan	Germany; Anja Fichtel-Mauritz; Sabine Bau; Monika Weber; Zita Funkenhauser

== Medal table ==
Rank	Nation	Gold	Silver	Bronze	Total
1	Russia (RUS)	2	2	0	4
2	Italy (ITA)	2	1	5	8
3	France (FRA)	1	3	2	6
4	Hungary (HUN)	1	1	2	4
5	Germany (GER)	1	1	1	3
6	Romania (ROU)	1	1	0	2
7	Cuba (CUB)	1	0	1	2
7	Poland (POL)	1	0	1	2
9	Spain (ESP)	0	1	0	1
10	Colombia (COL)	0	0	1	1
10	Estonia (EST)	0	0	1	1
10	Ukraine (UKR)	0	0	1	1
Totals (12 entries)		10	10	15	35
