= 1998 World Fencing Championships =

1998 World Championships in Fencing
- Dates: October 6 – 11
- Host city: La Chaux-de-Fonds, Switzerland

The 1998 World Fencing Championships were held in La Chaux-de-Fonds, Switzerland.

== Medal summary ==
=== Men's events ===
Event	Gold	Silver	Bronze
Individual Épée	(France) Hugues Obry	(Sweden) Peter Vanky	(Cuba) Carlos Pedroso (Hungary) Attila Fekete
Individual Foil	(Ukraine) Sergei Golubitsky	(Cuba) Elvis Gregory Gil	(Italy) Salvatore Sanzo (Poland) Piotr Kielpikowski
Individual Sabre	(Italy) Luigi Tarantino	(Italy) Raffaello Caserta	(Spain) Fernando Medina (Russia) Sergey Sharikov
Team Épée	Hungary; Attila Fekete; Géza Imre; Krisztián Kulcsár; Iván Kovács	France; Hugues Obry; Frantz Philippe; Rémy Delhomme; Éric Srecki	Russia; Pavel Kolobkov; Valery Zakharevich; Andrey Kolotilin; Aleksandr Eletskikh
Team Foil	Poland; Piotr Kielpikowski; Slawomir Mocek; Adam Krzesinski	France; Patrice Lhotellier; Laurent Bel; Lionel Plumenail	South Korea; Kim Yong-ho; You Bong-Hyung; Chung Kwang-Suk; Kim Seung-Pyo
Team Sabre	Hungary; Domonkos Ferjancsik; György Boros; Zsolt Nemcsik; József Navarrete	France; Damien Touya; Jean-Philippe Daurelle; Matthieu Gourdain; Gael Touya	Poland; Norbert Jaskot; Marcin Sobala; Rafał Sznajder; Dariusz Gilman

=== Women's events ===
Event	Gold	Silver	Bronze
Individual Épée	(France) Laura Flessel-Colovic	(Germany) Denise Holzkamp	(Hungary) Hajnalka Tóth (Hungary) Gyöngyi Szalay
Individual Foil	(Germany) Sabine Bau	(Russia) Svetlana Boyko	(Italy) Valentina Vezzali (Italy) Giovanna Trillini
Team Épée	France; Laura Flessel-Colovic; Valérie Barlois-Mevel-Leroux; Sophie Moressée-Pichot; Sangita Tripathi	Cuba; Tamara Estery Almeida; Mirayda Garcia Soto; Zuleid Ortiz Puente; Mila Palma Gonzalez	Ukraine; Eva Vybornova; Viktoria Titova; Alla Mironuk; Anna Garina
Team Foil	Italy; Valentina Vezzali; Giovanna Trillini; Annamaria Giacometti; Diana Bianchedi	Romania; Reka Zsofia Lazăr-Szabo; Roxana Scarlat; Laura Badea; Claudia Vanță	Poland; Barbara Wolnicka; Sylwia Gruchała; Anna Rybicka; Magdalena Mroczkiewicz

== Medal table ==
Rank	Nation	Gold	Silver	Bronze	Total
1	France (FRA)	3	3	0	6
2	Italy (ITA)	2	1	3	6
3	Hungary (HUN)	2	0	3	5
4	Germany (GER)	1	1	0	2
5	Poland (POL)	1	0	3	4
6	Ukraine (UKR)	1	0	1	2
7	Cuba (CUB)	0	2	1	3
8	Russia (RUS)	0	1	2	3
9	Romania (ROU)	0	1	0	1
9	Sweden (SWE)	0	1	0	1
11	South Korea (KOR)	0	0	1	1
11	Spain (ESP)	0	0	1	1
Totals (12 entries)		10	10	15	35
