= Yeva Vybornova =

Ukrainian fencer (born 1974)

Personal information
- Born: 13 November 1974 (age 51)

Sport
- Sport: Fencing
Medal record
Women's épée
Representing Ukraine
World Championships
Bronze medal – third place	1998 La Chaux-de-Fonds	Team
European Championships
Silver medal – second place	1995 Keszthely	Individual
Silver medal – second place	1998 Plovdiv	Team
Bronze medal – third place	2001 Coblenz	Team
Bronze medal – third place	2002 Moscow	Team
Bronze medal – third place	2005 Zalaegerszeg	Team
Summer Universiade
Gold medal – first place	1999 Mallorca	Team
Bronze medal – third place	2001 Beijing	Team

Yeva Vybornova (born 13 November 1974) is a Ukrainian fencer. She competed in the women's épée event at the 1996 Summer Olympics.
