= Sergey Sharikov =

Russian fencer

Personal information
- Born: 18 June 1974 Moscow, Russian SFSR, Soviet Union
- Died: 6 June 2015 (aged 40) Tarussky District, Kaluga Oblast, Russia
Medal record
Men's fencing
Representing Russia
Olympic Games
| Gold medal – first place | 1996 Atlanta | Team sabre |
| Gold medal – first place | 2000 Sydney | Team sabre |
| Silver medal – second place | 1996 Atlanta | Individual sabre |
| Bronze medal – third place | 2004 Athens | Team sabre |
World Championships
| Gold medal – first place | 2001 Nîmes | Team sabre |
| Gold medal – first place | 2002 Lisbon | Team sabre |
| Gold medal – first place | 2003 Havana | Team sabre |
| Silver medal – second place | 1995 The Hague | Team sabre |
| Silver medal – second place | 1997 Cape Town | Team sabre |
| Bronze medal – third place | 1998 La Chaux-de-Fonds | Individual sabre |
| Bronze medal – third place | 1999 Seoul | Team sabre |
Maccabiah Games
| Gold medal – first place | 2001 Israel | Individual sabre |
| Silver medal – second place | 2005 Israel | Individual sabre |
Summer Universiade
| Gold medal – first place | 1995 Fukuoka | Team sabre |
| Gold medal – first place | 2001 Beijing | Individual sabre |
| Gold medal – first place | 2001 Beijing | Team sabre |
| Bronze medal – third place | 1997 Catania | Individual sabre |
| Bronze medal – third place | 1999 Palma de Mallorca | Individual sabre |
| Bronze medal – third place | 1999 Palma de Mallorca | Team sabre |

Sergey Aleksandrovich Sharikov (Russian: Сергей Александрович Шариков, 18 June 1974 – 6 June 2015), also known as Serguei/Sergei Charikov, was a left-handed Russian Olympic champion sabre fencer. In the Olympics he won two gold medals, a silver medal, and a bronze medal.

== Early life ==
Sharikov was born in Moscow, Russia, and was Jewish.

== Fencing career ==
One of the best sabre fencers in the world, Sharikov began fencing at the age of 12. He was a protege of sabre fencer David Tyshler. Sharikov was on the Russian national fencing team from 1994 to 2005.

=== World University Games ===
At the 1997 Summer Universiade and 1999 Summer Universiade, he won bronze medals at the World University Games in sabre.

In 2001, while ranked second in the world in sabre, he won the 21st World University Games sabre championship and was part of the Russian team that won the team gold (beating Hungary, 45–37).

=== European Championships ===
He won the 2000 European Fencing Championships, and came in second at the 2002 European Fencing Championships, and third at the 2004 European Fencing Championships. His team won the gold medal in 2000–02 and 2004.

=== World Championships and World Cup ===
In 1994, he won an individual gold medal at the Junior World Fencing Championships. In 1995, he won a team silver medal at the 1995 World Fencing Championships, and an individual silver medal at the Fencing World Cup.

He placed third in the individual sabre events at the 1998 World Fencing Championships and 2000 World Fencing Championships, and third in the team sabre event at the 1999 World Fencing Championships. His team won the gold medal in 2001–03.

=== Olympics ===
He competed in three Olympiads for Russia, winning 4 medals (through 2011, that was the most medals won by any fencer for Russia).

At the 1996 Atlanta Games, ranked as world # 4, he competed in both the individual and team events. In the team sabre competition, Sharikov and the Russians defeated Hungary in the final (45–25) to win the gold medal. In the individual competition, Sharikov easily advanced to the final before losing 15–12 to teammate Stanislav Pozdnyakov; he was awarded the silver medal.

Sharikov returned to the Olympics at the 2000 Sydney Games and helped lead the Russian team to its second consecutive gold medal in the team sabre event; they easily defeated France in the final, 45–32. In the individual sabre, Sharikov entered the Olympics as the # 3 seed (he was also ranked # 3 in the world), but was eliminated in the third round of the competition, 15–14.

Sharikov was seeded fourth in the individual sabre event in the 2004 Athens Games. The Russian lost a close match, 13–15 in the quarterfinal, to Italian Aldo Montano, who went on to win the gold. In the team event, Russia lost its semifinal encounter with Italy 42–45, but Russia won the bronze medal match.

=== Maccabiah Games ===
Sharikov competed for the Russian team at the 2001 Maccabiah Games in Israel. He won the gold medal in the individual sabre over fellow Olympian, Vadim Gutzeit of Ukraine.

He also competed in the 2005 Maccabiah Games in Israel, this time winning the silver medal as Vadim Gutzeit beat him 15–13 for the gold medal.

== Coaching and federation career ==
Sharikov coached the Russia fencing team at the 2001 Maccabiah Games. After finishing his competitive career, Sharikov was a member of the executive committee of the Russian Fencing Federation, and in 2009 he became head coach of the Russian national sabre reserve team.

== Hall of Fame ==
Sharikov was inducted into the International Jewish Sports Hall of Fame in 2003 and 2005.

== Death ==
Sharikov died in the evening of 6 June 2015 in an automobile accident at the age of 40. While on vacation, he was driving an all-terrain vehicle on the Kaluga-Tarusa-Serpukhov highway south-west of Moscow as a part of a group of ATV drivers when he lost control of his vehicle and it changed into the opposite traffic lane and collided head-on with a car driving in the opposite direction. The other car's driver was hospitalized. Sharikov was rushed to the Tarusa district central hospital, but died there from his injuries.

== See also ==
- List of select Jewish fencers
- List of Jewish Olympic medalists
