= 1995 European Fencing Championships =

Fencing championship

The 1995 European Fencing Championships were held in Keszthely, Hungary. The competition consisted of individual events only.

== Medal summary ==
=== Men's events ===
Event	Gold	Silver	Bronze
Foil	Sergei Golubitsky (UKR)	Lorenzo Taddei (ITA)	Uwe Römer (GER); Dmitriy Shevchenko (RUS)
Épée	Arnd Schmitt (GER)	Iván Kovács (HUN)	Andreas Kertesz (SWE); Péter Vánky (SWE)
Sabre	Raffaello Caserta (ITA)	Jean-Philippe Daurelle (FRA)	Serhii Berko (UKR); Sergey Yermolayev (RUS)

=== Women's events ===
Event	Gold	Silver	Bronze
Foil	Reka Szabo (ROU)	Diana Bianchedi (ITA)	Yelena Grishina (RUS); Monika Weber (GER)
Épée	Tímea Nagy (HUN)	Yeva Vybornova (UKR)	Claudia Bokel (GER); Gianna Bürki (SUI)

=== Medal table ===
Rank	Nation	Gold	Silver	Bronze	Total
1	Italy	1	2	0	3
2	Ukraine	1	1	1	3
3	Hungary	1	1	0	2
4	Germany	1	0	3	4
5	Romania	1	0	0	1
6	France	0	1	0	1
7	Russia	0	0	3	3
8	Sweden	0	0	2	2
9	Switzerland	0	0	1	1
Totals (9 entries)		5	5	10	20
