= Viktoriya Titova =

Ukrainian fencer (born 1971)

Personal information
- Born: 29 July 1971 (age 55)

Sport
- Sport: Fencing
Medal record
Women's épée
World Championships
Representing Soviet Union
Bronze medal – third place	1991 Budapest	Team
Representing Ukraine
Bronze medal – third place	1993 Essen	Team
Bronze medal – third place	1998 La Chaux-de-Fonds	Team
Representing Ukraine
European Championships
Silver medal – second place	1998 Plovdiv	Team
Summer Universiade
Gold medal – first place	1999 Mallorca	Team
Bronze medal – third place	1995 Fukuoka	Individual
Bronze medal – third place	1997 Sicily	Individual

Viktoriya Titova (born 29 July 1971) is a Ukrainian former fencer. She competed in the women's épée event at the 1996 Summer Olympics.
