= 1998 European Fencing Championships =

The 1998 European Fencing Championships were held in Plovdiv, Bulgaria.

== Medal summary ==
=== Men's events ===
Event	Gold	Silver	Bronze
Foil	Ralf Bißdorf (GER)	Wolfgang Wienand (GER)	Michael Ludwig (AUT); Márk Marsi (HUN)
Épée	Hugues Obry (FRA)	Éric Srecki (FRA)	Vitaly Zakharov (BLR); Vladimir Pzhenikin (BLR)
Sabre	Marcin Sobala (POL)	Luigi Tarantino (ITA)	Jean-Philippe Daurelle (FRA); József Navarrete (HUN)
Team Foil	Germany	Poland	Austria
Team Épée	Hungary	France	Russia
Team Sabre	Poland	Italy	Russia

=== Women's events ===
Event	Gold	Silver	Bronze
Foil	Valentina Vezzali (ITA)	Sabine Bau (GER)	Olga Velichko (RUS); Reka Zsofia Lazăr-Szabo (ROU)
Épée	Elisa Uga (ITA)	Barbara Ciszewska (POL)	Monika Maciejewska (POL); Claudia Bokel (GER)
Team Foil	Russia	Germany	Italy
Team Épée	Germany	Ukraine	Poland

=== Medal table ===
Rank	Nation	Gold	Silver	Bronze	Total
1	Germany	3	3	1	7
2	Poland	2	2	2	6
3	Italy	2	2	1	5
4	France	1	2	1	4
5	Russia	1	0	3	4
6	Hungary	1	0	2	3
7	Ukraine	0	1	0	1
8	Austria	0	0	2	2
8	Belarus	0	0	2	2
10	Romania	0	0	1	1
Totals (10 entries)		10	10	15	35
