= Laura Flessel-Colovic =

French politician and fencer

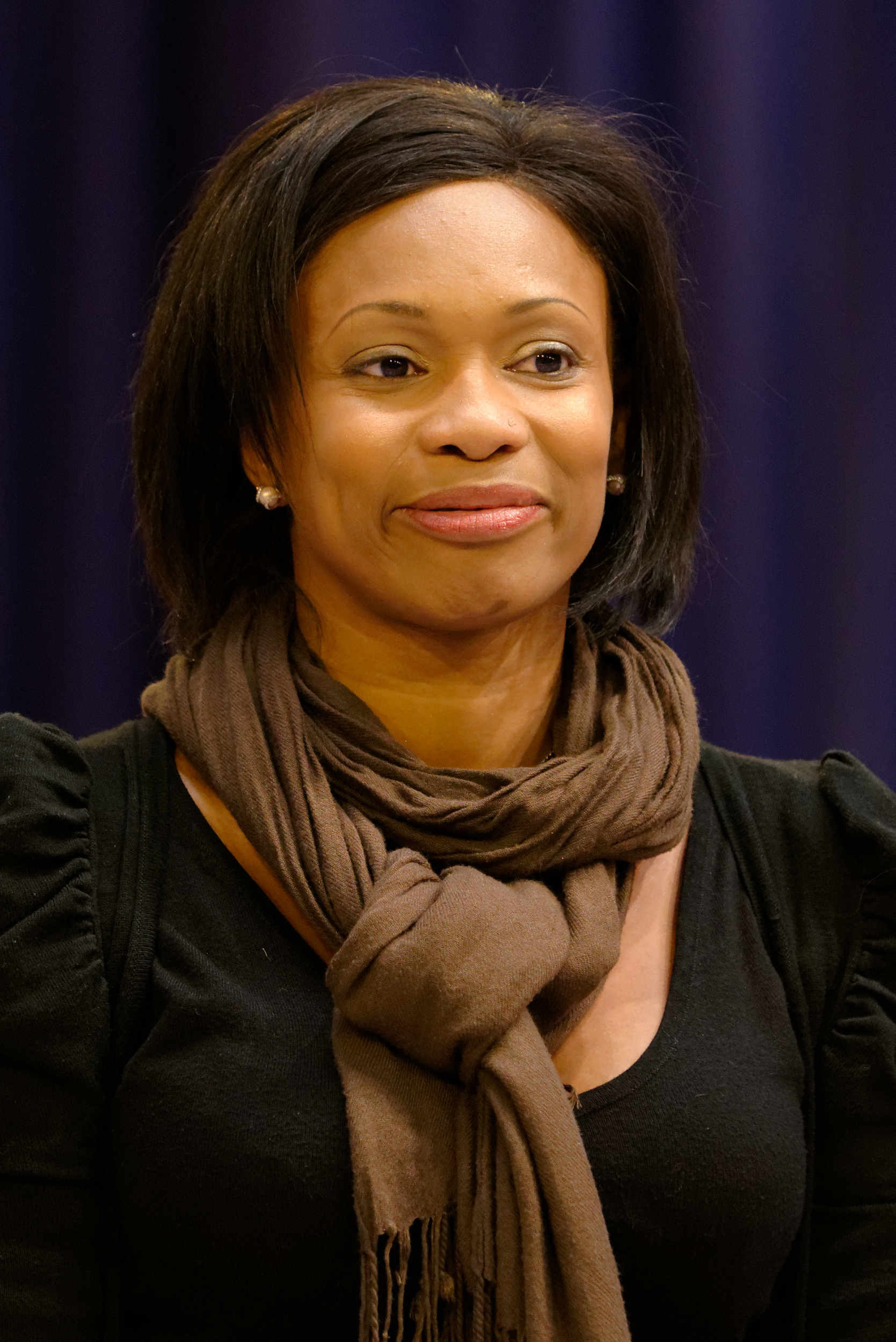
- Flessel-Colovic in 2013

Minister of Sports
- In office 17 May 2017 – 4 September 2018
- Prime Minister: Édouard Philippe
- Preceded by: Patrick Kanner
- Succeeded by: Roxana Maracineanu

Personal details
- Born: 6 November 1971 (age 54) Petit-Bourg, Guadeloupe, France
- Spouse: Denis Colovic
- Children: 1
- Fencing career
- Height: 1.70 m (5 ft 7 in)
- Weight: 60 kg (132 lb)
- Sport: Fencing
- Weapon: épée
- Hand: left-handed
- Personal coach: Daniel Levavasseur
- Retired: 2012
- FIE ranking: archive
Medal record
Women's fencing
Representing France
Olympic Games
Gold medal – first place	1996 Atlanta	Individual épée
Gold medal – first place	1996 Atlanta	Team épée
Silver medal – second place	2004 Athens	Individual épée
Bronze medal – third place	2000 Sydney	Individual épée
Bronze medal – third place	2004 Athens	Team épée
World Championships
Gold medal – first place	Chaux-de-Fds. 1998	Individual épée
Gold medal – first place	Chaux-de-Fds. 1998	Team épée
Gold medal – first place	Seoul 1999	Individual épée
Gold medal – first place	Leipzig 2005	Team épée
Gold medal – first place	St.Petersburg 2007	Team épée
Gold medal – first place	Beijing 2008	Team épée
Silver medal – second place	The Hague 1995	Team épée
Silver medal – second place	Nîmes 2001	Individual épée
Silver medal – second place	Turin 2006	Team épée
Bronze medal – third place	The Hague 1995	Individual épée
Bronze medal – third place	Cape Town 1997	Team épée
Bronze medal – third place	Leipzig 2005	Individuel épée
Bronze medal – third place	Turin 2006	Individuel épée
European Championships
Gold medal – first place	Ghent 2007	Individual épée
Bronze medal – third place	Ghent 2007	Team épée
Bronze medal – third place	Plovdiv 2009	Individual épée
Bronze medal – third place	Leipzig 2010	Individual épée
Bronze medal – third place	Leipzig 2010	Team épée
Bronze medal – third place	Sheffield 2011	Team épée
Mediterranean Games
Silver medal – second place	Almería 2005	Individual épée
Fencing World Cup
Gold medal – first place	2002	Individual épée
Gold medal – first place	2003	Individual épée
Gold medal – first place	2004	Individual épée
Silver medal – second place	2005	Individual épée
Silver medal – second place	2007	Individual épée
Bronze medal – third place	1997	Individual épée
Bronze medal – third place	2006	Individual épée

Laura Flessel-Colovic (born 6 November 1971) is a French politician and épée fencer who served as Minister of Sports from 2017 to 2018. Born in Pointe-à-Pitre, Guadeloupe, she has won the most Olympic medals of any French sportswoman, with five. Before 2007, she was a member of the Levallois Sporting Club Escrime, and now works with Lagardère Paris Racing. She is married and has one daughter.

She was France's flag-bearer at the 2012 Summer Olympics opening ceremony in London, which was her fifth and last Olympics.

She was appointed Minister of Sports in the Philippe Government on 17 May 2017 and resigned on 4 September 2018.

== Sporting career ==
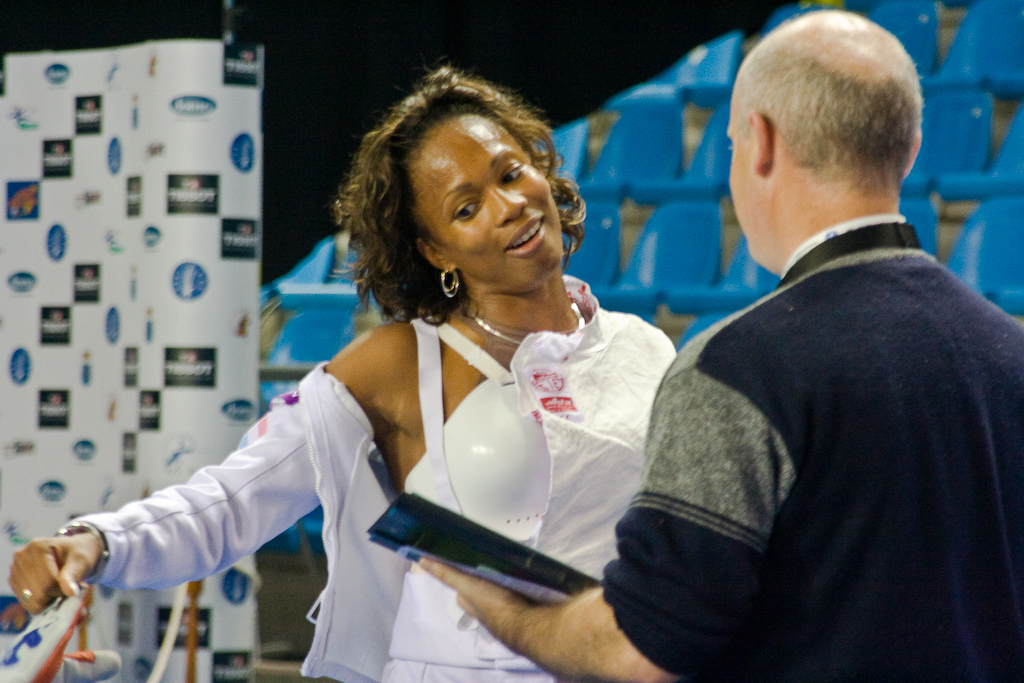
Laura Flessel at 2007 European Fencing Championships

=== Fencer ===
Laura Flessel began fencing at age six and quickly became a very talented fencer. She progressed quickly and became champion of Guadeloupe. Then, she gained solid experience on the Caribbean, Central American and Pan American circuits, winning in 1990 the Pan American Championships in foil and épée. The same year, she moved to mainland France, to train with the Racing Club de France. She also trained within INSEP, allowing her to face the best French fencers.

She won her first world stage success in 1995, finishing in third place at the Hague World Championships. This bronze medal is accompanied by a silver medal in the team event, which was defeated 45 to 44 by Hungary. Her teammates were Valérie Barlois, Sophie Moressee and Sangita Tripathi.

After her gold medal at the 1996 Summer Olympics and her victory at 1998 World Cup, she became the eighth French fencer, and first woman, to win the Olympic and World Champion titles. She was one of the favorites for the 2000 Summer Olympics title. She ultimately lost in the semi-final against Timea Nagy. At the 2006 World Championships in Turin, she got a new individual bronze medal, beaten again by Timea Nagy

The 2008 Summer Olympics, her fourth Olympic Games, marks a turning point as it is the first Olympics where she does not get a medal after being eliminated by Li Na (15–9) in the quarter-finals. The year 2009 again saw Flessel at the top but still without success, with a third place at the European Championships in Plovdiv and a failure at the World Championships in Antalya where she lost in the quarter-final against Lyubov Shutova after a close match ending in sudden death, 7 to 8.

On 21 April 2012, she qualifies for the individual event of the London Olympics by defeating Emma Samuelsson in the semifinals of the European Zone Qualifying Championship in Bratislava. On 14 May 2012, Laura Flessel is officially designated flag bearer of the French delegation for the London Olympics. In her final competition, she defeated Courtney Hurley (15–12) before losing to Simona Gherman (No. 4 worldwide) 15–13. She ends her career at the age of 40.

=== Doping offense ===
Laura Flessel was banned for three months in 2002 after failing a doping test. She tested positive for the banned substance coramine glucose, blaming the French team doctors for giving her a drug that is available over the counter in France.

=== Sports management ===
In 2012, she took over the management of Nathalie Moellhausen, a native of Italy and competing under the colors of Brazil, forming a group also composed of two fencing masters, Daniel Levavasseur and Michel Sicard, the latter having both coached Flessel.

== Sports consultant and other activities ==
=== Media and television ===
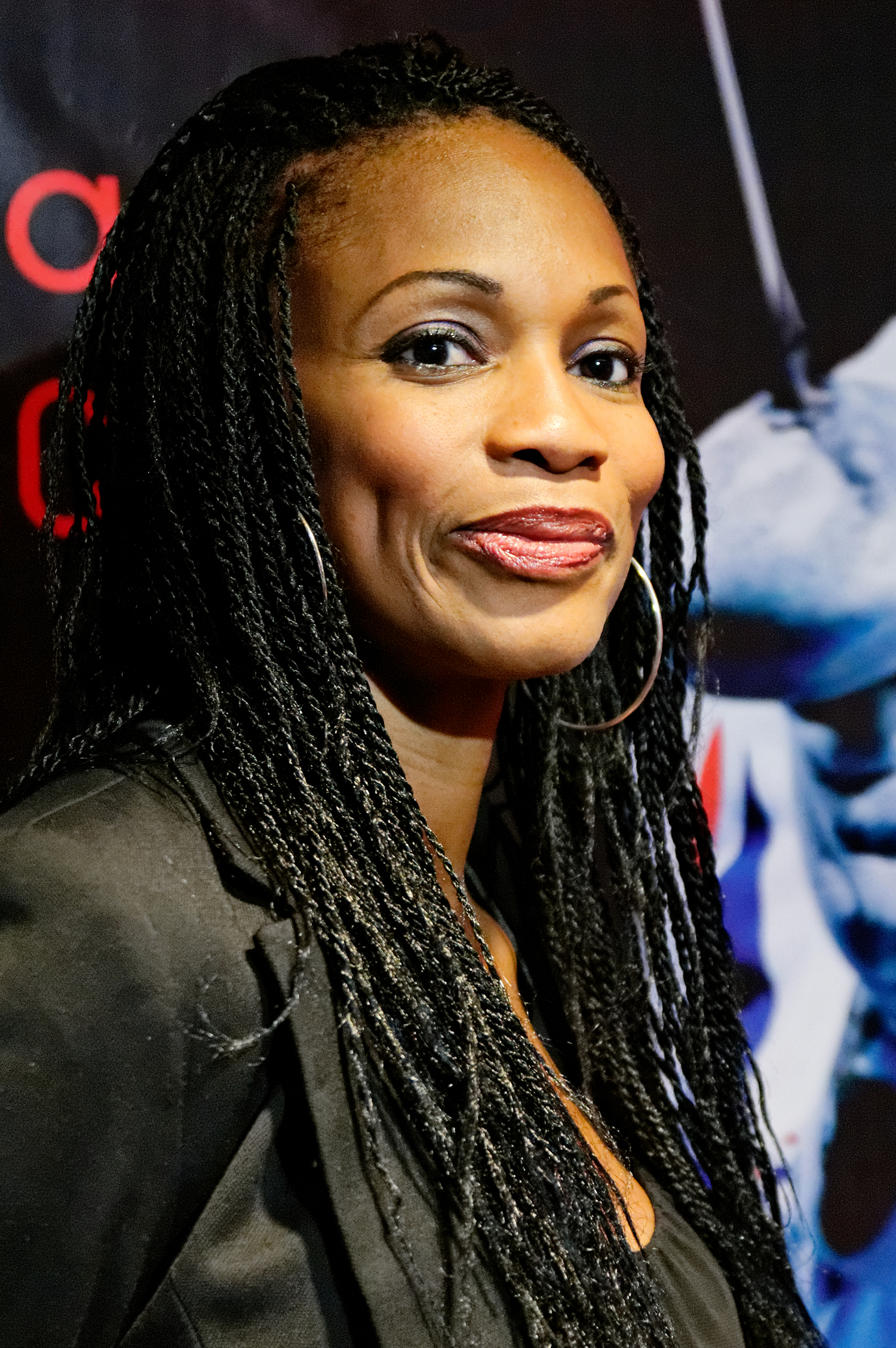
Laura Flessel in 2012

In 2008, Laura Flessel was a columnist for the daily newspaper Aujourd'hui Sport.

She was a contestant on the third season of Danse avec les stars.

During the 2016 Summer Olympics she commented, on Canal +, the opening ceremony with Stéphane Guy and Joris Sabi, the fencing events with Frédéric Roullier and the closing ceremony with Julien Fébreau and Jean Galfione.

In 2012, she participated in season 3 of Danse avec les stars (the French version of Dancing with the Stars) with her partner Grégoire Lyonnet but got eliminated in week 3, finishing 9th out of 10.

=== Community life ===
She is ambassador of the AMREF Flying Doctors' Stand Up for African Mothers campaign, the godmother of Handicap International, and Ambassador of Plan France. His long-term project is to bring fencing to disadvantaged cities and places. She is also a goodwill ambassador for UNESCO, where she promotes tolerance in sports.

She founded the association Ti'Colibri which aims to promote fencing. Thanks to its action, it has been able to offer means and equipment to clubs with few resources.

== Political career ==
During the two-rounds of the French presidential election of 2017, she was one of the sixty active or retired sportsmen who signed a call to vote for Emmanuel Macron on 7 May 2017 in the second round of the presidential election "so that sport remains an area of freedom, equality and fraternity."

On 17 May 2017, she was appointed Minister of Sports in the First Philippe government, under the presidency of Emmanuel Macron, a position she held in the Second Philippe government, which was formed on 21 June 2017.

The government's second most popular minister at the end of 2017, she is notably responsible for preparing the organization of the 2024 Summer Olympics. At the beginning of 2018, she launched a campaign against discrimination in the sporting world, with as ambassadors Antoine Griezmann, Estelle Mossely, Marie-Amélie Le Fur, Frédéric Michalak, Emmeline Ndongue and Florent Manaudou.

== Honours ==
- Summer Olympics
  - Gold Medal in individual épée in 1996
  - Gold Medal in team épée in 1996
  - Silver Medal in individual épée in 2004
  - Bronze Medal in individual épée in 2000
  - Bronze Medal in team épée in 2004
- World Championships
  - Gold Medal in individual épée in 1998
  - Gold Medal in team épée in 1998
  - Gold Medal in individual épée in 1999
  - Gold Medal in team épée in 2005
  - Gold Medal in team épée in 2008
  - Silver Medal in team épée in 1995
  - Silver Medal in individual épée in 2001
  - Silver Medal in team épée in 2006
  - Bronze Medal in individual épée in 1995
  - Bronze Medal in team épée in 1997
  - Bronze Medal in individual épée in 2005
  - Bronze Medal in individual épée in 2006
- World Cup Fencing
  - World Cup winner individual épée in 2002, 2003 and 2004
  - World Cup runner-up individual épée in 1997

Olympic Games
Preceded by Tony Estanguet	Flagbearer for France; London 2012	Succeeded by Teddy Riner
