= Sergei Golubitsky =

Ukrainian fencer (born 1969)

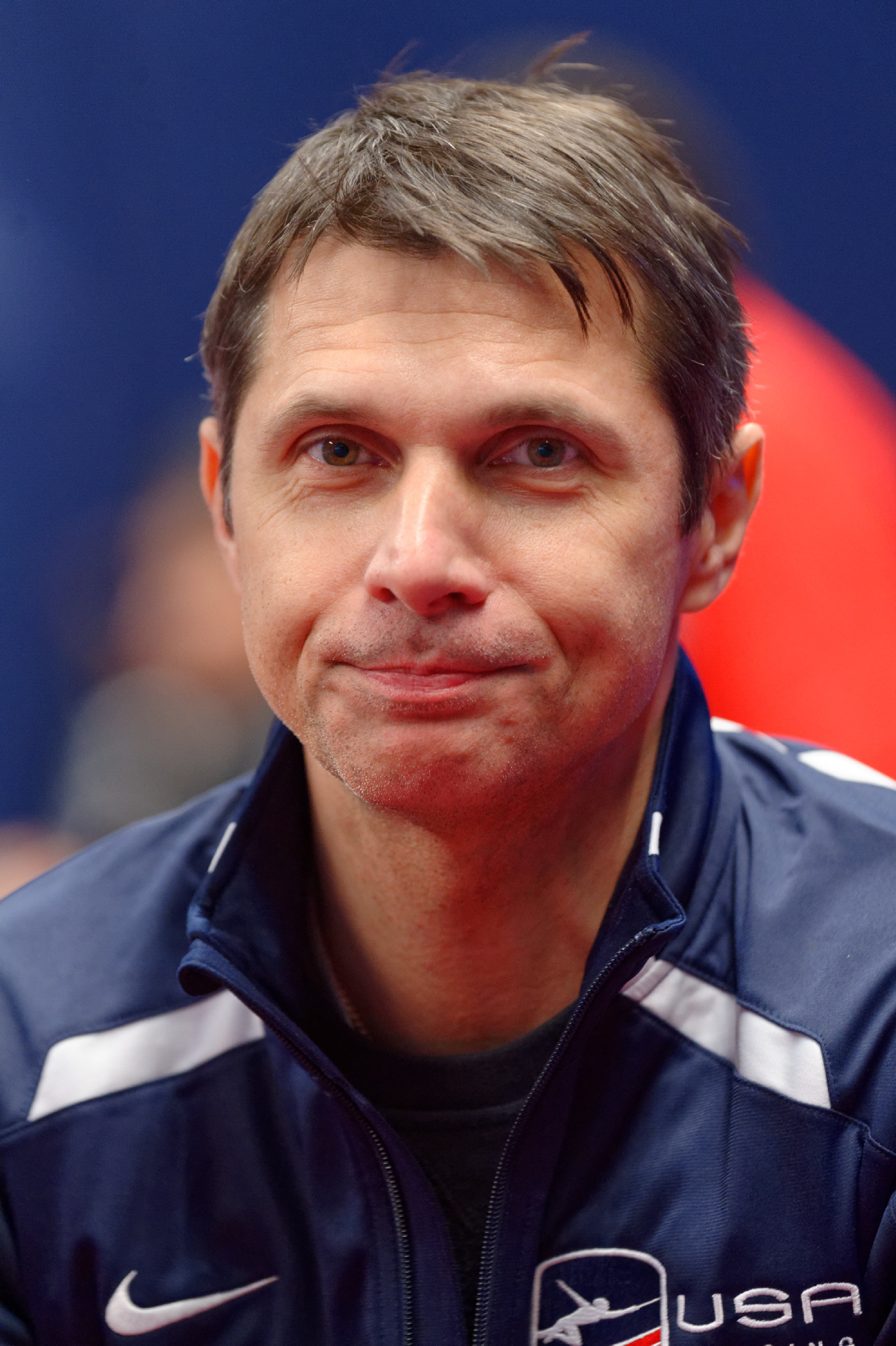
- Golubitsky in 2017

Personal information
- Nationality: Ukrainian
- Born: 20 December 1969 (age 56) Kiev, Ukrainian SSR, USSR
- Spouse: Rachel Golubitsky

Sport
- Sport: Fencing
- Event: Foil
Medal record
Men's fencing
Representing Unified Team
Olympic Games
Silver medal – second place	1992 Barcelona	Individual
Representing Soviet Union
World Championships
Gold medal – first place	1989 Denver	Team
Bronze medal – third place	1990 Lyon	Team
Representing Ukraine
Gold medal – first place	1997 Cape Town	Individual
Gold medal – first place	1998 La Chaux-de-Fonds	Individual
Gold medal – first place	1999 Seoul	Individual
Silver medal – second place	1993 Essen	Individual
Bronze medal – third place	1995 The Hague	Individual
Representing Ukraine
European Championships
Gold medal – first place	1995 Keszthely	Individual
Silver medal – second place	1997 Gdańsk	Individual
Summer Universiade
Representing Soviet Union
Silver medal – second place	1991 Sheffield	Team
Representing Ukraine
Gold medal – first place	1993 Buffalo	Individual
Gold medal – first place	1997 Sicily	Team
Silver medal – second place	1995 Fukuoka	Team
Silver medal – second place	1997 Sicily	Individual

Sergei Golubitsky (Ukrainian: Сергій Віталійович Голубицький, romanized: Serhiy Vitaliyovych Holubyts’kyy, Russian: Серге́й Вита́льевич Голуби́цкий, tr. Sergéy Vitál’evich Golubítskiy; born 20 December 1969) is a Ukrainian fencer. He is a 1992 Barcelona Olympic Games silver medalist and four-time World Champion in men's foil, including an unprecedented three consecutive titles from 1997 to 1999. He held the world No. 1 ranking for ten consecutive years. Golubitsky currently resides in the United States, and has run the Golubitsky Fencing Center in Tustin, California since 2012. He also collaborated with the Leon Paul company to design a signature fencing blade. He wrote his autobiography, Fencing Is My Life, in 2004. The book was translated into French and published in France in 2013 under the title L'escrime dans la peau.

== Career highlights ==
- 2000 Olympics: 5th Place (Australia)
- 1999 World Champion (Korea)
- World Cup Champion (end of season points leader)
- Super Masters: Gold Medal (Italy)
- 1998 World Champion (Switzerland)
- 1997 World Champion (South Africa)
- Universiade: Silver Medal (Italy)
- European Championships: Silver Medal (Poland)
- Awarded with Order of the President of Ukraine
- 1996 Olympics: 6th Place (USA)
- 1995 World Championships: Bronze Medal (Netherlands)
- European Champion (Hungary)
- 1994 World Cup Champion (end of season points leader)
- 1993 Universiade: Gold Medal (USA)
- World Championships: Silver Medal (Germany)
- World Cup Champion (end of season points leader)
- 1992 Olympics: Silver Medal (Spain)
- World Cup Champion (end of season points leader)
- 1991 Cup of Ukraine: Gold Medal
- Cup of the USSR: Gold Medal
- 1990 World Championships: Bronze Medal by Team (France)
- European Cup: Gold Medal (France)
- 1989 World Champion by Team (USA)
- 1985 Cup of Ukraine: Gold Medal
