= Michèle Wolf =

Michèle Wolf may refer to:

- Michèle Wolf (fencer)
- Michèle Wolf (footballer)

== See also ==
- Michelle Wolf, American comedian and writer
- Michelle Wolff, American actress
