= Francesca Bortolozzi =

Italian fencer (born 1968)

Personal information
- Born: 4 May 1968 (age 58) Padua, Italy

Sport
- Sport: Fencing
Medal record
Women's fencing
Representing Italy
Olympic Games
Gold medal – first place	1992 Barcelona	Team foil
Gold medal – first place	1996 Atlanta	Team foil
Silver medal – second place	1988 Seoul	Team foil
World Championships
Gold medal – first place	1995 The Hague	Team foil
Gold medal – first place	1991 Budapest	Team foil
Gold medal – first place	1993 Essen	Individual foil
Silver medal – second place	1994 Athens	Team foil
Bronze medal – third place	1987 Lausanne	Team foil
Bronze medal – third place	1989 Denver	Team foil
Bronze medal – third place	1993 Essen	Team foil
Bronze medal – third place	1994 Athens	Individual foil
Summer Universiade
Gold medal – first place	1989 Duisburg	Team foil
Gold medal – first place	1991 Sheffield	Team foil
Gold medal – first place	1993 Buffalo	Team foil
Mediterranean Games
Gold medal – first place	1991 Athens	Individual foil

Francesca Bortolozzi (born 4 May 1968) is an Italian former fencer. She won two gold medals and a silver in the women's team foil events between 1988 and 1996. She won a gold medal at the individual foil event. She is married to Andrea Borella, who was also an Olympic fencing champion for Italy.
