= Dariusz Gilman =

Polish fencer

Dariusz Gilman is a former sabre fencer who represented Poland and earned a bronze medal from the 1998 World Fencing Championships. In the years since, he has become an American citizen and fencing coach.

== Fencing career ==
Gilman began fencing when he was 10 years old, started competing internationally in his early teens, and continued competing for more than a decade. In 1991, he won both the European and World Championships in the Cadet (under 17) event. In 1992, he won the European Championships in the Junior (under 20) event. In 1998, he and the Polish sabre team took third in the team event at the World Championships. He was also a Polish national champion.

== Coaching career ==
After retiring from professional fencing and moving to America, Gilman took over the sabre program at the DC Fencers Club in Silver Spring, Maryland, where he coached for over a decade. In 2013, he opened the Capital Fencing Academy in Rockville, Maryland. He has also worked with Ed Korfanty and the Penn State University elite sabre program. In all of his years coaching, Gilman has trained fencers who have become champions and medalists at World Cups, Junior Olympics, NCAA, and USFA national competitions. He is certified as a fencing master with the US Fencing Coaches Association.
