= Simone Bauer =

German fencer

Personal information
- Born: 12 November 1973 (age 52) Wertheim am Main, West Germany

Sport
- Sport: Fencing
- Club: FC Tauberbischofsheim

Simone Bauer (born 12 November 1973) is a German fencer. She competed in the women's individual foil event at the 2004 Summer Olympics.

Simone Bauer attended the Kaufmännische Schule Tauberbischofsheim and fought for the Fencing-Club Tauberbischofsheim.

== Success ==
1993 World Fencing Championships, foil, team
1999 World Fencing Championships, foil, team
1989 Cadet World Fencing Championships, foil, individual
1990 Cadet World Fencing Championships, foil, individual
1991 Junior World Fencing Championships, foil, individual
1993 World Fencing Championships, foil, individual
