= Vilmoș Szabo =

Romanian fencer (born 1964)

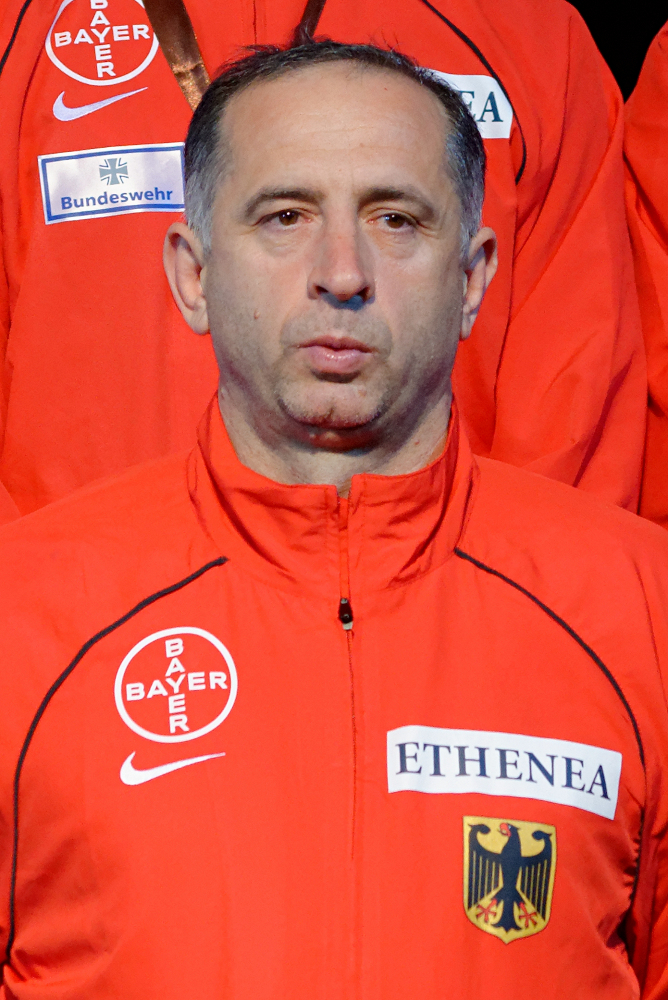
- Szabo in 2014

Personal information
- Nationality: Hungarian
- Born: 30 December 1964 (age 61) Brașov, Romania
- Height: 181 cm (5 ft 11 in)
- Weight: 70 kg (154 lb)

Sport
- Sport: Fencing
- Event: Sabre
- Club: CSA Steaua București
- Coached by: Mihai Ticusan; László Rohonyi
Medal record
Representing Romania
Olympic Games
Bronze medal – third place	1984 Los Angeles	Sabre, team
World Championships
Bronze medal – third place	1994 Athens	Team sabre

Vilmoș Szabo (Hungarian: Szabó Vilmos, born 30 December 1964) is a retired Romanian sabre fencer. He competed at the 1984, 1992 and 1996 Olympics and won a team bronze medal in 1984.

He is an ethnic Hungarian and he married Olympic foil medallist Reka Zsofia Lazăr. They moved to Germany in 1993 and became fencing coaches at TSV Bayer Dormagen. Since 2008 Vilmoș Szabo has coached the German national sabre team. Under his direction, Nicolas Limbach earned a gold medal in the 2009 World Championships and Germany won the first World team gold medal in their history in the 2014 World Championships.

Szabo and his wife have two sons. One, Matyas, is a sabre fencer and member of the German national team.
