= Ildikó Mincza-Nébald =

Hungarian fencer

Personal information
- Born: 6 November 1969 (age 57) Budapest, Hungary

Sport
- Sport: Fencing
Medal record
Representing Hungary
Olympic Games
Bronze medal – third place	2008 Beijing	Individual épée
World Championships
Gold medal – first place	1999 Seoul	Team épée
Bronze medal – third place	1994 Athens	Team épée
Bronze medal – third place	1999 Seoul	Individual épée
Bronze medal – third place	2001 Nîmes	Team épée
Bronze medal – third place	2003 Havana	Team épée
Summer Universiade
Gold medal – first place	1993 Buffalo	Individual foil
Gold medal – first place	1997 Catania	Team foil
Gold medal – first place	1997 Catania	Team épée
Silver medal – second place	1995 Fukuoka	Individual foil
Bronze medal – third place	1997 Catania	Individual foil

Ildikó Mincza-Nébald (born 6 December 1969) is a Hungarian épée fencer.

Mincza-Nébald won the bronze medal in the individual épée event at the 2008 Summer Olympics, losing the semi-final 14–15 to Ana Maria Brânză and winning 15–11 against Li Na in the play-off for third place. She was named Hungarian Sportswoman of the Year for this achievement.

== Awards ==
- Hungarian Fencer of the Year (3): 1999, 2001, 2008
- Hungarian Sportswoman of the Year (1) - votes of sports journalists: 2008

Orders and special awards

- Order of Merit of the Republic of Hungary – Knight's Cross (2008)

Awards
Preceded by Ágnes Szávay	Hungarian Sportswoman of The Year; 2008	Succeeded by Katinka Hosszú
