= Stanislav Pozdnyakov =

Russian fencer

- Станислав Поздняков
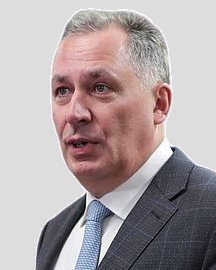
- Pozdnyakov in 2021

4th President of the Russian Olympic Committee
- In office 2 May 2018 – 13 December 2024
- Preceded by: Alexander Zhukov
- Succeeded by: Mikhail Degtyarev

Personal details
- Born: Stanislav Alekseyevich Pozdnyakov; 27 September 1973 (age 53) Novosibirsk, Novosibirsk Oblast, Russian SFSR, USSR
- Sports career
- Height: 178 cm (5 ft 10 in)
- Weight: 78 kg (172 lb)
- Sport: Fencing
Medal record
Men's sabre
Representing Unified Team
Olympic Games
Gold medal – first place	1992 Barcelona	Team
Representing Russia
Olympic Games
Gold medal – first place	1996 Atlanta	Individual
Gold medal – first place	1996 Atlanta	Team
Gold medal – first place	2000 Sydney	Team
Bronze medal – third place	2004 Athens	Team
World Championships
Gold medal – first place	1994 Athens	Team
Gold medal – first place	1997 Cape Town	Individual
Gold medal – first place	2001 Nîmes	Individual
Gold medal – first place	2001 Nîmes	Team
Gold medal – first place	2002 Lisbon	Individual
Gold medal – first place	2002 Lisbon	Team
Gold medal – first place	2003 Havana	Team
Gold medal – first place	2005 Leipzig	Team
Gold medal – first place	2006 Turin	Individual
Gold medal – first place	2007 St. Petersburg	Individual
Silver medal – second place	1994 Athens	Individual
Silver medal – second place	1995 The Hague	Team
Silver medal – second place	1997 Cape Town	Team
Silver medal – second place	1999 Seoul	Individual
Silver medal – second place	2005 Leipzig	Individual
Bronze medal – third place	1999 Seoul	Team
Bronze medal – third place	2006 Turin	Team
European Championships
Gold medal – first place	1994 Krakow	Individual
Gold medal – first place	2000 Funchal	Team
Gold medal – first place	2001 Koblenz	Individual
Gold medal – first place	2001 Koblenz	Team
Gold medal – first place	2002 Moscow	Individual
Gold medal – first place	2002 Moscow	Team
Gold medal – first place	2003 Bourges	Individual
Gold medal – first place	2003 Bourges	Team
Gold medal – first place	2004 Kopenhagen	Individual
Gold medal – first place	2004 Kopenhagen	Team
Gold medal – first place	2005 Zalaegerszeg	Team
Gold medal – first place	2007 Gent	Team
Gold medal – first place	2008 Kyiv	Team
Bronze medal – third place	1998 Plovdiv	Team
Bronze medal – third place	2000 Funchal	Individual
Bronze medal – third place	2006 Izmir	Team
Bronze medal – third place	2007 Gent	Individual
Summer Universiade
Gold medal – first place	1995 Fukuoka	Individual
Gold medal – first place	1995 Fukuoka	Team
Silver medal – second place	1999 Palma de Mallorca	Individual
Bronze medal – third place	1999 Palma de Mallorca	Team

Stanislav Alekseyevich Pozdnyakov (Russian: Станислав Алексеевич Поздняков, IPA: [stənʲɪˈslaf pəzʲnʲɪˈkof]; born 27 September 1973) is a Russian former fencer, five-time Olympian (1992–2008), and five-time Olympic medalist in individual and team sabre competitions who previously served as president of the Russian Olympic Committee from 2018 to 2024. He is also a ten-time individual and team world champion, in 1994–2007. In 2022, he was removed from his position as European Fencing Confederation (EFC) president at an Extraordinary Congress following a unanimous vote of no confidence in Pozdnyakov, due to his conduct in the wake of the Russian invasion of Ukraine.

== Personal ==
His daughter Sofia Pozdniakova is also a fencer. She won the gold medal in the 2020 Tokyo Olympics Women's Individual Sabre event. Her clubs are the Russian Central Sports Army Club and the Novosibirsk Regional Fencing Sports School of Olympic Reserve.

Pozdnyakov's former son-in-law Konstantin Lokhanov won two world junior championships in sabre, and fenced in the Tokyo Olympics in 2021. His son-in-law emigrated to the United States in the wake of the Russian invasion of Ukraine, however, as he was against the war, and at the end of the day the couple divorced. Describing her decision to not accept her husband's request that she join him in the United States, Sofia later said: "As for feelings, love, there was a moment when we did not understand where to go. I got up in the morning and thought: 'That’s it, I’m going to the States.' I was figuring out how I would communicate with my parents, how to explain all this to my dad... He would simply erase me from his life. Then the next day such thoughts: 'So, I’m staying here, my parents, my family – this is important to me.'" Pozdnyakov called his daughter’s decision "the most important gift for Father’s Day."

After Lokhanov moved to the United States, his father-in-law – in what The New York Times called an apparent swipe at Western frivolousness—referred to him obliquely as having "the sad fate of frightened lovers of raspberry frappé and yellow scooters." When asked about the remark, Lokhanov said he found it funny and unsurprising, even though he was not quite sure why it had been made, and then added with a smile: "I never had a scooter. I'm a big coffee lover, but not frappé."

== Russian Army ==
Rank insignia of lieutenant colonel in the Russian Army

Pozdnyakov has been a lieutenant colonel in the Russian Army.

In September 2022, Pozdnyakov urged Russian athletes to fight for Russia in Russia's war against Ukraine, saying the athletes should feel honored to do so. He said: "From the point of view of the Russian Olympic Committee (ROC), we, being citizens of the country, consider service to the motherland is an honourable duty and an honourable duty of every citizen, including members of national teams."

In April 2023, during the Russian invasion of Ukraine, Pozdnyakov announced that the ROC had awarded CSKA (the Russian Central Army Sports Club, which is a department of the Russian Defence Ministry, and which is also Pozdnyakov's own club) with the ROC's Badge of Honor "For Merits in the Development of the Olympic Movement in Russia," and he attended a special presentation to present the award to Russian military officers.

== Fencing career ==
Pozdnyakov was one of the most successful Olympic fencers of his time. At the 1992 Summer Olympics in Barcelona, Spain, as a member of the Unified Team he received a team gold, though he lost the only bout he fenced, to Canadian Jean-Paul Banos.

In 1996, in Atlanta, Georgia, United States, now competing for Russia, he again won gold in the team event, and added his third gold in the individual event. His third Olympics was in 2000, where he won his third consecutive team gold (his fourth gold overall), though in the individual competition he was knocked out with a defeat in his second bout. At the 2004 Olympics, Pozdnyakov again competed as part of the Russian men's sabre team, which beat the USA 45-44 for the bronze medal.

At his fifth and last Olympics in 2008, Pozdnyakov lost his only bout in the individual competition. He then finished without a medal in team as well, as Russia was defeated in the semi-finals by the USA 45–44, as Pozdnyakov failed to win a bout against the Americans. The United States had been losing to Russia 40-35 going into the last bout, but in that match American Keeth Smart outscored Pozdnyakov 10-4 for the one-touch team win. Russia then also lost its bronze medal match. Pozdnyakov subsequently retired.

In his career, Pozdnyakov won the World Fencing Championships individual event five times, and the team event five times. He also won three individual and two team silver medals, and two team bronze medals.

== Sports administrative career ==
=== 2008–14 ===
In 2008 Pozdnyakov became head coach for the Russian national team in all weapons. In 2009 he was appointed first deputy president of the Russian Fencing Federation.

=== 2015–19 ===
In June 2016 he was elected President of the European Fencing Confederation (EFC). All Confederation Presidents are members of the Executive Committee of the International Fencing Federation (FIE).

From 2016-18 Pozdnyakov was First Vice-President of the Russian Olympic Committee.

In 2017 he received the "Order of Merit for the Fatherland” classe II for "the successful preparation of athletes who have achieved high sporting achievements at the XXXI Olympic Games in 2016."

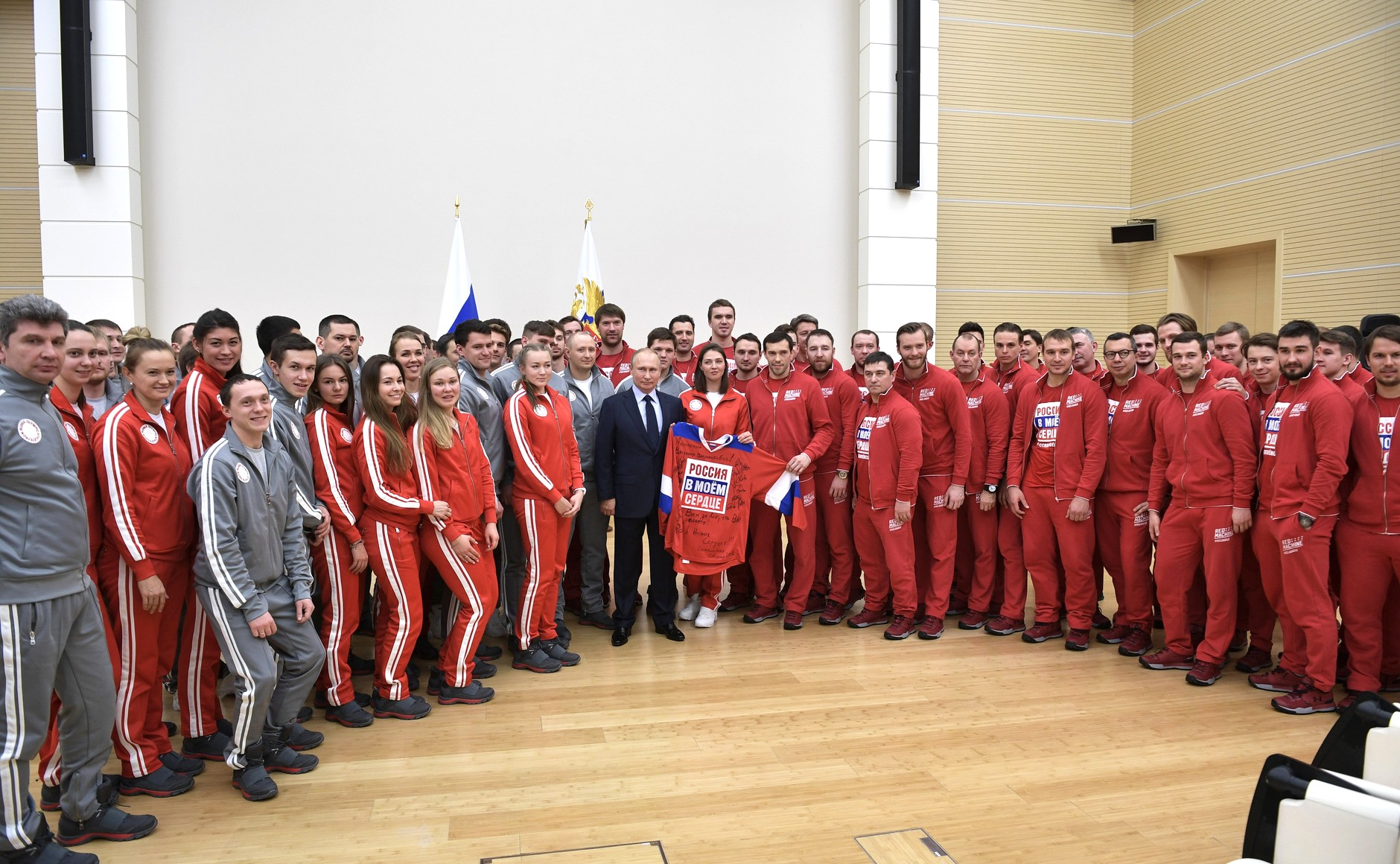
The "Olympic Athletes from Russia" neutral delegation for the 2018 Winter Olympics that Pozdnyakov managed, with Vladimir Putin.

In February 2018, he managed the "Olympic Athletes from Russia" neutral delegation at the Winter Olympics in PyeongChang, South Korea, after Russia's team was banned for doping. He was questioned by the press as to how it could be that he was managing the team, given that the Russian Olympic Committee had been suspended from the Winter Games, and he was the ROC's vice president. Pozdnyakov responded: "The IOC decision says that the Russian Olympic Committee is suspended. The president and the general secretary for the Russian Olympic Committee are not able to participate in these games. But (there's) nothing about the vice president or other staff members of the Russian Olympic Committee."

Since he was elected in May 2018, as Vladimir Putin's choice, Pozdnyakov has served as the President of the Russian Olympic Committee. He was re-elected in 2022.

In December 2019, after the World Anti-Doping Agency (WADA) banned Russia from all major sporting events for four years for tampering with laboratory data on doping, Pozdnyakov opined that the sanctions were inappropriate and excessive. WADA imposed the sanctions after its executive committee concluded that Russia had planted fake evidence, and deleted files linked to positive doping tests in laboratory data that could have helped identify drug cheats.

=== 2020–present ===
In June 2022, he was removed from his position as European Fencing Confederation (EFC) President at an Extraordinary Congress following a unanimous vote of no confidence in Pozdnyakov that March, due to his xenophobic conduct in the wake of the Russian invasion of Ukraine which had commenced in late February 2022.

In February 2023, Vadym Gutzeit, Ukraine's Youth and Sport Minister as well as the president of the Ukrainian Fencing Federation (and former Olympic champion sabre fencer) and the President of the National Olympic Committee of Ukraine, who had competed with Pozdnyakov when they were teammates from Russia and Ukraine on the post-Soviet Unified Team at the 1992 Olympics, said he had only contempt for Pozdnyakov. Gutzeit blames Pozdnyakov for vocally supporting Russia's invasion of Ukraine. Gutzeit said: "I don't want to talk to him. I don't want to know him at all. He is my enemy, who supports this war, who considers it an honor for athletes to take part in the war against Ukrainians, to kill Ukrainians. Therefore, for today and forever, this person does not exist for me.”

In April 2023, Pozdnyakov expressed surprise that there was talk of Russian athletes losing motivation during their continued ineligibility to compete in major international events, as a result of the Russian invasion of Ukraine.

In July 2023, a Russian effort to have Ukrainian three-time world sabre champion Olha Kharlan black-carded at the 2023 World Fencing Championships backfired dramatically. Kharlan had offered her defeated Russian opponent a tapping of blades at the end of their bout, a pandemic substitute for handshakes, rather than a handshake. Kharlan was briefly black-carded by the FIE, an hour after the Russian's protest was lodged, but upon the event being reviewed by the IOC its president granted Kharlan an automatic berth in the 2024 Paris Olympics, expressed empathy for what she had gone through, and had the FIE reverse itself. Pozdnyakov railed against what he called the "duplicity" of the IOC, and accused it of picking a sides in a political conflict.

In December 2023, Pozdnyakov directly threatened any Russian athlete who may choose to participate as a "neutral" at the 2024 Olympics, saying: "As the head of the ROC, I voice a clear position: ... We live in a free state... But... we strongly recommend that you thoroughly understand ... the extent and consequences of the personal responsibility assumed." In June 2024, top Russian Olympic official and Vladimir Putin's lieutenant Dmitry Chernyshenko stated that Russian athletes would not violate Russian law by competing in Paris as neutrals and encouraged them to participate.

Pozdnyakov resigned as head of the ROC on 15 October 2024, citing "timely" reasons such as "geopolitical changes".

== See also ==
- Multiple medallist at the World Fencing Championships
