= Milagros Palma =

Cuban fencer (born 1973)

Personal information
- Born: 19 May 1973 (age 53) Cienfuegos, Cuba

Sport
- Sport: Fencing
Medal record
Representing Cuba
World Fencing Championships
Silver medal – second place	1998 La Chaux-du-Fonds	Team épée
Pan American Games
Silver medal – second place	1995 Mar del Plata	Individual épée
Silver medal – second place	1995 Mar del Plata	Team épée
Central American and Caribbean Games
Gold medal – first place	1990 Mexico City	Team épée
Gold medal – first place	1998 Maracaibo	Team épée
Bronze medal – third place	1993 Ponce	Team épée

Milagros Palma González (born 19 May 1973) is a Cuban fencer. She competed in the women's individual and team épée events at the 1996 Summer Olympics.
