= Mitch Escanellas =

Puerto Rican fencer (born 1973)

Mirthescka Escanellas
Personal information
- Nickname: Mitch
- Nationality: Puerto Rican
- Born: 19 June 1973 (age 53) San Juan, Puerto Rico

Sport
- Country: Puerto Rico
- Sport: Fencing
- Team: Puerto Rican National Team
- Coached by: Gilberto Peña/Enrique Salvat
- Retired: 2005
Medal record
Fencing
Representing Puerto Rico
Central American and Caribbean Games
Gold medal – first place	1993 Ponce	Team epee
Silver medal – second place	1998 Maracaibo	Individual foil
Silver medal – second place	2002 San Salvador	Individual foil
Silver medal – second place	2002 San Salvador	Team foil
Bronze medal – third place	1993 Ponce	Team foil
Bronze medal – third place	1993 Ponce	Individual foil

Mirthescka Escanellas (born 19 June 1973) is a Puerto Rican épée and foil fencer. She competed in the women's individual épée event at the 1996 Summer Olympics.

== Early years ==
Escanellas was raised in Carolina, Puerto Rico. Her athletic career began with gymnastics, but she pivoted to fencing at 12 years old after an injury.

Escanellas was introduced to fencing by her older sister, Sasha, and her father, Juan José.

== Fencing career ==
Escanellas was a member of the Puerto Rican national team for eighteen years, until 2005, during which she represented Puerto Rico in dozens of international competitions and championships. Escanellas has represented Puerto Rico in five Central American and Caribbean Games: Santiago 1986, Ciudad de México 1990, Ponce 1993, Maracaibo 1998, and San Salvador 2002.

Her bronze medal in women's foil at the 1993 Central American and Caribbean Games was Puerto Rico's first individual medal at the Central American level. Escanellas won her first individual gold medal at the 1997 Central American Fencing Championship held in Panama.

Hector Cardona, President of the Puerto Rico Olympic Committee (COPUR), named her one of the most distinguished athletes of 1998; she was the only woman honored.

In 2009, she became a television host for Movida Olímpica, an Univision show that covered different topics in the sports world.

== 1996 Olympic Games ==
In November 1995, Escanellas won gold at the Fencing Pre-Olympic Tournament held in Venezuela, qualifying for the 1996 Atlanta Olympic Games. She competed against her sister, Sasha, in the final round.

At the Olympics, Escanellas competed in individual épée. She was Puerto Rico's only épée fencer; there was no Puerto Rican fencing team. She placed 47th.
