= Mariette Schmit =

Luxembourgish fencer

Personal information
- Born: 4 September 1953 (age 72) Luxembourg City, Luxembourg

Sport
- Sport: Fencing

Mariette Schmit (born 4 September 1953) is a Luxembourgish fencer. She competed in the women's individual épée event at the 1996 Summer Olympics.
