= Oksana Yermakova =

Estonian and Russian épée fencer (born 1973)

Personal information
- Full name: Oksana Ivanovna Yermakova
- Born: 16 April 1973 (age 53) Tallinn, then part of Estonian SSR, Soviet Union

Sport
- Sport: Fencing
- Event: Épée
Medal record
Women's fencing
Olympic Games
Representing Russia
Gold medal – first place	2000 Sydney	Team épée
Gold medal – first place	2004 Athens	Team épée
World Championships
Representing Soviet Union
Bronze medal – third place	1991 Budapest	Team épée
Bronze medal – third place	1991 Budapest	Individual épée
Representing Estonia
Gold medal – first place	1993 Essen	Individual épée
Bronze medal – third place	1995 The Hague	Team épée
Representing Russia
Gold medal – first place	2003 Havana	Team épée
European Championships
Representing Russia
Gold medal – first place	2003 Bourges	Team epée
Gold medal – first place	2004 Copenhagen	Team epée
Gold medal – first place	2005 Zalaegerszeg	Team epée
Silver medal – second place	2002 Moscow	Team epée
Bronze medal – third place	2002 Moscow	Individual épée
Bronze medal – third place	2004 Copenhagen	Individual épée
Summer Universiade
Representing Russia
Gold medal – first place	1999 Palma de Mallorca	Individual épée
Silver medal – second place	1997 Catania	Team épée

Oksana Ivanovna Yermakova (Russian: Оксана Ивановна Ермакова, Estonian: Oksana Jermakova, also spelled Oxana Ermakova, born 16 April 1973) is an Estonian and Russian épée fencer.

She represented Soviet Union in 1991, Estonia in 1992–1997 and Russia in 1998–2005. She won two gold medals in the team épée event at the 2000 and 2004 Summer Olympics. She competed for Estonia at the 1996 Summer Olympics.

She is married to Russian former Olympic champion fencer and current coach Aleksandr Shirshov.
