= Karina Aznavourian =

Russian fencer (born 1974)

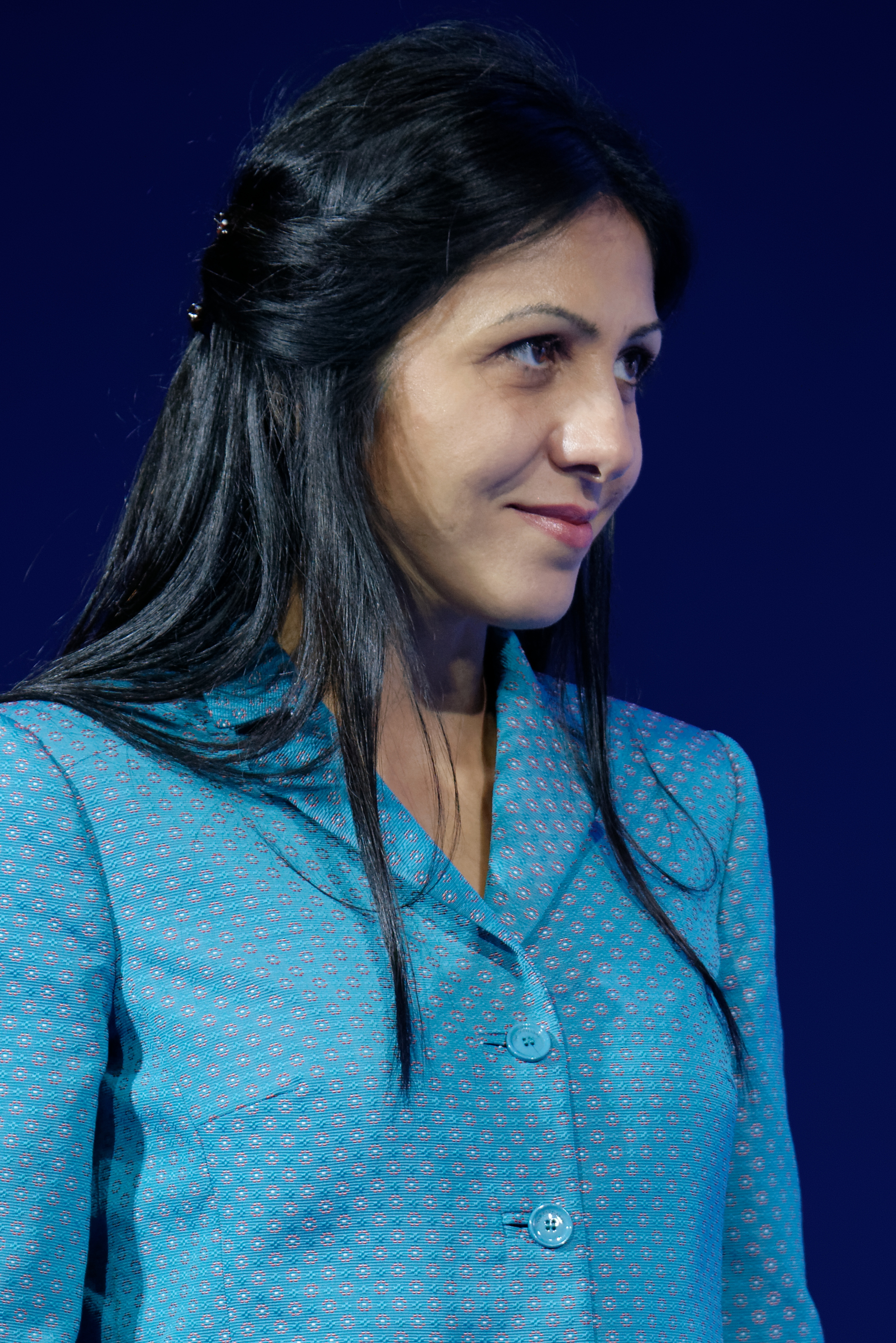

Personal information
- Full name: Karina Borisovna Aznavourian
- Born: 20 September 1974 (age 52) Baku, Azerbaijan SSR, Soviet Union
- Height: 1.70 m (5 ft 7 in)
- Weight: 59 kg (130 lb)

Fencing career
- Sport: Fencing
- Weapon: Épée
- Hand: Left-handed
- FIE ranking: archive
Medal record
Women's épée fencing
Representing Russia
Olympic Games
Gold medal – first place	2000 Sydney	Team épée
Gold medal – first place	2004 Athens	Team épée
Bronze medal – third place	1996 Atlanta	Team épée
World Championships
Gold medal – first place	2003 Havana	Team épée
Summer Universiade
Silver medal – second place	1997 Catania	Individual épée
Silver medal – second place	1997 Catania	Team épée

Karina Borisovna Aznavourian (Russian: Карина Борисовна Азнавурян; Armenian: Կարինա Բորիսի Ազնավուրյան; born 20 September 1974) is a Russian épée fencer. She won two gold medals in the team épée event at the 2000 and 2004 Summer Olympics. Also won bronze medal at the 1996 Summer Olympics.

== Biography ==
Aznavourian was born in Baku in an Armenian-Azerbaijani family. In 1990, she and her family moved to Moscow. Having changed the type of weapon from the rapier to the Épée, she began to train under the guidance of Alexander Kislyunin.

She graduated from the Olympic Reserve School No. 3, then graduated from the Russian State University of Physical Education, Sport, Youth and Tourism.

In 1996, as part of the Russian national team became the bronze medalist at the Olympic Games in Atlanta. In 1997, she won silver medals of the 19th Summer Universiade, both in team and individual competitions. Later in the Russian team won the Olympic Games in Sydney (2000) and Athens (2004), then she won the World Championships in 2003 and Europe Championships in 2004.

After completing her sports career in 2008, she headed the junior sports school of the Moscow Secondary Special School of Olympic Reserve No. 3, and in August 2012 she was appointed as a director of this school.

== Awards ==
- Order of Honour (24 August 2005)
- Order of Friendship (19 April 2001)
- Medal of the Order "For Merit to the Fatherland" (6 January 1996)
