= Luigi Tarantino =

Italian fencer

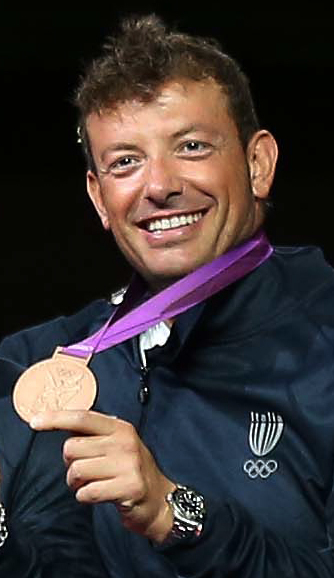

Personal information
- Nickname: Gigi
- Born: 10 November 1972 (age 53) Naples
- Height: 1.87 m (6 ft 2 in)
- Weight: 96 kg (212 lb)

Fencing career
- Sport: Fencing
- Weapon: sabre
- Hand: right-handed
- Club: CS Carabinieri
- Personal coach: Fernando Meglio
- FIE ranking: current ranking
Medal record
Men's sabre
Representing Italy
Olympic Games
Silver medal – second place	2004 Athens	Team sabre
Bronze medal – third place	1996 Atlanta	Team sabre
Bronze medal – third place	2008 Beijing	Team sabre
Bronze medal – third place	2012 London	Team sabre
World Championships
Gold medal – first place	1995 The Hague	Team sabre
Gold medal – first place	1998 La Chaux	Individual sabre
Silver medal – second place	1997 Cape Town	Individual sabre
Silver medal – second place	2002 Lisbon	Team sabre
Silver medal – second place	2005 Leipzig	Team sabre
Silver medal – second place	2009 Antalya	Team sabre
Silver medal – second place	2010 Paris	Team sabre
Bronze medal – third place	1999 Seoul	Individual sabre
Bronze medal – third place	2002 Lisbon	Individual sabre
Bronze medal – third place	2007 St.Petersburg	Team sabre
Bronze medal – third place	2009 Antalya	Individual sabre
Bronze medal – third place	2011 Catania	Individual sabre
Bronze medal – third place	2011 Catania	Team sabre
Mediterranean Games
Silver medal – second place	2005 Almería	Individual sabre
Summer Universiade
Gold medal – first place	1993 Buffalo	Team sabre
Gold medal – first place	1997 Catania	Team sabre
Silver medal – second place	1997 Catania	Individual sabre

Luigi Tarantino (born 10 November 1972) is an Italian fencer and Olympic medalist in the sabre competition. He was the 1998 World Champion for men's sabre.

== Achievements ==
Fencing World Cup

- Sabre (1998, 2008)
