= Reka Zsofia Lazăr-Szabo =

Romanian fencer (born 1967)

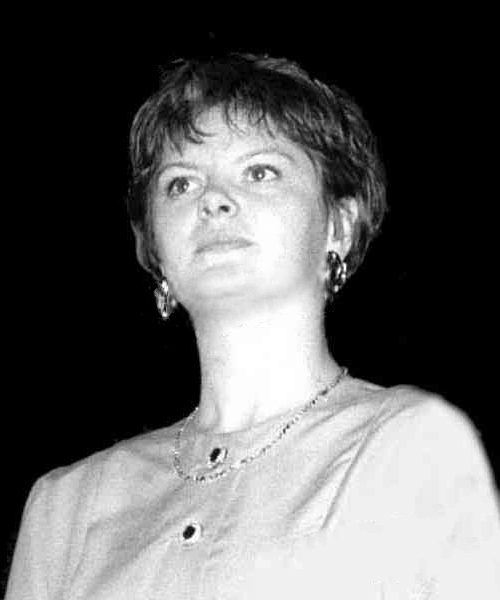
- Szabo in 1992

Personal information
- Nationality: Hungarian
- Born: 11 March 1967 (age 59) Brașov, Romania
- Height: 168 cm (5 ft 6 in)
- Weight: 58 kg (128 lb)

Fencing career
- Sport: Fencing
- Weapon: Foil
- Hand: Right-handed
- Club: CS Tractorul Brașov; CS Progresul București; CSA Steaua București; TSV Bayer Dormagen
- Retired: 2004
Medal record
Representing Romania
Olympic Games
Silver medal – second place	1996 Atlanta	Team foil
Bronze medal – third place	1992 Barcelona	Team foil
World Championships
Gold medal – first place	1994 Athens	Individual
Gold medal – first place	1994 Athens	Team foil
Silver medal – second place	1987 Lausanne	Team foil
Silver medal – second place	1995 The Hague	Team foil
Silver medal – second place	1997 Cape Town	Team foil
Silver medal – second place	1998 La Chaux	Team foil
Bronze medal – third place	2002 Lisbon	Team foil
Bronze medal – third place	2003 Havana	Team foil
European Championships
Gold medal – first place	1995 Keszthely	Individual
Silver medal – second place	2000 Madeira	Individual
Bronze medal – third place	1998 Plovdiv	Individual
Bronze medal – third place	2001 Coblenz	Team Foil
Summer Universiade
Bronze medal – third place	1995 Fukuoka	Individual

Reka Zsofia Lazăr-Szabo (Hungarian: Lázár-Szabó Réka Zsófia, born 11 March 1967) is a Romanian foil fencer, bronze medallist in the 1992 Summer Olympics, World champion in 1994, and silver medallist at the 1996 Summer Olympics.

== Career ==
She is of Hungarian-ethnic background. Lazăr-Szabo began fencing when she was 7 years old at CS Tractorul in her hometown Brașov. Her elder brother already fenced there. When her father announced to coach Petre Dumitrescu he had to withdraw his son because he could not leave his daughter at home without supervision, Dumitrescu suggested he bring the girl as well. After a few weeks of watching her brother train, she took an interest in the sport. Her first coaches were Bogdan Pincovici, then Vlad Șerban. At the age of 12 she won her first national championship.

In 1983 she won the Romanian Cup and joined the national senior team. The same year, she took part in her first international competition at the Minsk Junior World Cup. She ranked in the Top 16 at her first Junior World Championships in Leningrad. A year later, in 1985, she reached the final of the Junior World Championships in Arnhem and came away with a silver medal. She won the Junior World title in 1986 at Stuttgart. She made her Olympic début at Seoul 1988, but she was defeated in the second round in the individual event and in the first round in the team event.

In 1989 she married Vilmoș Szabo, bronze medallist in men's team sabre at the 1984 Summer Olympics, also a member of the Hungarian minority in Romania. In the 1992 Summer Olympics in Atlanta she won a team bronze medal along with Claudia Grigorescu, Elisabeta Guzganu-Tufan, Laura Badea and Roxana Dumitrescu. Her husband and her moved to Germany in 1993; he became a fencing coach at TSV Bayer Dormagen, which became her club. She took the gold medal both in the individual and team events at the 1994 World Championships in Atlanta. Two years later, she earned a silver Olympic medal with the team.

Lazăr-Szabo retired from competition in 2004, after 21 years spent in the national team, after missing the qualification for the 2004 Summer Olympics. Her eldest son Matyas, born in 1991, took up fencing because their parents were always at the fencing hall; he is now a member of Germany's senior sabre team and won with them the 2014 World Championships. She stopped her coaching activities after her second son, Marc, was born.

Lazăr-Szabo was inducted in 2013 in the Hall of Fame of the International Fencing Federation.
