= Yuliya Garayeva =

Russian fencer (born 1968)

Personal information
- Born: 27 July 1968 (age 57) Moscow, Russia

Sport
- Sport: Fencing
Medal record
Women's fencing
Representing Russia
Olympic Games
Bronze medal – third place	1996 Atlanta	Team épée

Yuliya Ravilyevna Garayeva (Russian: Юлия Равильевна Гараева) (born 27 July 1968) is a former Russian fencer of Tatar descent, who won bronze Olympic medals in the team épée competition at the 1996 Summer Olympics in Atlanta.
