= Yan Jing =

Chinese fencer (born 1970)

Personal information
- Born: 28 October 1970 (age 54)

Sport
- Sport: Fencing

Yan Jing (born 28 October 1970) is a Chinese fencer. She competed in the women's individual épée event at the 1996 Summer Olympics.
