= Henda Zaouali =

Tunisian fencer

Personal information
- Born: 29 August 1960 (age 65)

Sport
- Sport: Fencing
- Coached by: Ioan Pop

Henda Zaouali (Arabic: هندا زوالي; born 29 August 1960) is a retired Tunisian fencer. She competed in the women's individual foil and épée events at the 1996 Summer Olympics, losing both her bouts.
