= Nanae Tanaka =

Japanese fencer

Personal information
- Born: 26 March 1975 (age 51) Chiba, Chiba, Japan

Sport
- Sport: Fencing

Nanae Tanaka (田中 奈々絵, Tanaka Nanae; born 26 March 1975) is a Japanese fencer. She competed in the women's individual and team épée events at the 1996 Summer Olympics.
