= Joanna Jakimiuk =

Polish fencer

Personal information
- Born: 24 August 1975 (age 50) Wrocław, Poland

Sport
- Sport: Fencing

Joanna Jakimiuk (born 24 August 1975) is a Polish fencer. She competed in the women's individual épée event at the 1996 Summer Olympics. She won gold medal at the 1995 World Fencing Championships in the women's individual épée event.
