= Fencing at the 1997 Summer Universiade =

Fencing events were contested at the 1997 Summer Universiade in the island of Sicily, Italy.

== Medal overview ==
=== Men's events ===
Event	Gold	Silver	Bronze
Individual Foil	Rolando Tucker (CUB)	Sergei Golubitsky (UKR)	Vadim Ayupov (RUS); Wang Haibin (CHN)
Team Foil	Ukraine (UKR)	Cuba (CUB)	China (CHN)
Individual Épée	Oleksandr Horbachuk (UKR)	Iván Trevejo (CUB)	Davide Burroni (ITA); Gunther Krajevski (GER)
Team Épée	Ukraine (UKR)	Hungary (HUN)	Poland (POL)
Individual Sabre	Vadim Gutzeit (UKR)	Luigi Tarantino (ITA)	Sergey Sharikov (RUS); Dmitry Lapkes (BLR)
Team Sabre	Italy (ITA)	Hungary (HUN)	Ukraine (UKR)

=== Women's events ===
Event	Gold	Silver	Bronze
Individual Foil	Valentina Vezzali (ITA)	Anna Giacometti (ITA)	Ildikó Mincza (HUN); Xiao Aihua (CHN)
Team Foil	Hungary (HUN)	Italy (ITA)	Romania (ROM)
Individual Épée	Tímea Nagy (HUN)	Karina Aznavourian (RUS)	Barbara Ciszewska (POL); Viktoriya Titova (UKR)
Team Épée	Hungary (HUN)	Russia (RUS)	China (CHN)

== Medal table ==
* Host nation (Italy)

Rank	Nation	Gold	Silver	Bronze	Total
1	Ukraine (UKR)	4	1	2	7
2	Hungary (HUN)	3	2	1	6
3	Italy (ITA)*	2	3	1	6
4	Cuba (CUB)	1	2	0	3
5	Russia (RUS)	0	2	2	4
6	China (CHN)	0	0	4	4
7	Poland (POL)	0	0	2	2
8	Belarus (BLR)	0	0	1	1
8	Germany (GER)	0	0	1	1
8	Romania (ROU)	0	0	1	1
Totals (10 entries)		10	10	15	35
