= Fencing at the 1995 Summer Universiade =

Fencing events were contested at the 1995 Summer Universiade in Fukuoka, Japan.

== Medal overview ==
=== Men's events ===
Event	Gold	Silver	Bronze
Individual Foil	Elvis Gregory (CUB)	Dmitriy Shevchenko (RUS)	Ryszard Sobczak (POL)
Team Foil	Russia (RUS)	China (CHN)	Germany (GER)
Individual Épée	Pavel Kolobkov (RUS)	Paolo Milanoli (ITA)	Iván Kovács (HUN)
Team Épée	Hungary (HUN)	Ukraine (UKR)	Germany (GER)
Individual Sabre	Stanislav Pozdnyakov (RUS)	Vadim Gutzeit (UKR)	Steffen Wiesinger (GER)
Team Sabre	Russia (RUS)	France (FRA)	Hungary (HUN)

=== Women's events ===
Event	Gold	Silver	Bronze
Individual Foil	Valentina Vezzali (ITA)	Ildikó Mincza (HUN)	Reka Szabo (ROM)
Team Foil	Germany (GER)	Italy (ITA)	China (CHN)
Individual Épée	Tímea Nagy (HUN)	Katja Nass (GER)	Isabelle Pentucci (SUI)
Team Épée	Hungary (HUN)	China (CHN)	Italy (ITA)

== Medal table ==
Rank	Nation	Gold	Silver	Bronze	Total
1	Russia (RUS)	4	1	0	5
2	Hungary (HUN)	3	1	2	6
3	Italy (ITA)	1	2	1	4
4	Germany (GER)	1	1	3	5
5	Cuba (CUB)	1	0	0	1
6	China (CHN)	0	2	1	3
7	Ukraine (UKR)	0	2	0	2
8	France (FRA)	0	1	0	1
9	Poland (POL)	0	0	1	1
9	Romania (ROM)	0	0	1	1
9	Switzerland (SUI)	0	0	1	1
Totals (11 entries)		10	10	10	30
