= Sandra Kenel =

Swiss fencer

Personal information
- Born: 16 May 1973 (age 53)

Sport
- Sport: Fencing

Sandra Kenel (born 16 May 1973) is a Swiss fencer. She competed in the women's individual and team épée events at the 1996 Summer Olympics.
