= Katja Nass =

German fencer (born 1968)

Personal information
- Born: 26 November 1968 (age 57) Moers, West Germany

Sport
- Sport: Fencing
Medal record
Representing Germany
World Championships
Silver medal – second place	1993 Essen	Team épée
Silver medal – second place	1994 Athens	Individual épée
Silver medal – second place	1997 Cape Town	Team épée
Bronze medal – third place	1999 Seoul	Team épée
Summer Universiade
Gold medal – first place	1995 Fukuoka	Team foil
Silver medal – second place	1995 Fukuoka	Individual épée
Bronze medal – third place	1993 Buffalo	Team épée

Katja Nass (born 26 November 1968) is a German former fencer. She competed in the women's individual and team épée events at the 1996 and 2000 Summer Olympics.
