= Minna Lehtola =

Finnish fencer

Personal information
- Born: 24 January 1967 (age 59) Turku, Finland

Sport
- Sport: Fencing

Minna Lehtola (born 24 January 1967) is a Finnish fencer. She competed in the individual épée event at the 1996 Summer Olympics.
