= Noriko Kubo =

Japanese fencer

Personal information
- Born: 29 January 1972 (age 54) Kumamoto, Japan

Sport
- Sport: Fencing

Noriko Kubo (久保 紀子, Kubo Noriko; born 29 January 1972) is a Japanese fencer. She competed in the women's individual and team épée events at the 1996 Summer Olympics.
