= Helena Elinder =

Swedish fencer

Personal information
- Born: 31 August 1973 (age 52) Stockholm, Sweden

Sport
- Sport: Fencing
- Club: Djurgårdens IF

Helena Elinder (born 31 August 1973) is a Swedish fencer. She competed in the women's individual épée event at the 1996 Summer Olympics.

Elinder represented Djurgårdens IF.
