= Marcin Sobala =

Polish fencer

Personal information
- Born: 10 August 1972 (age 53) Warsaw, Poland

Sport
- Sport: Fencing

Marcin Janusz Sobala (born 10 August 1972) is a Polish fencer. He competed in the individual and team sabre events at the 2000 Summer Olympics. He won a silver medal at the 1999 World Fencing Championships in the team sabre event.
