= Laura Chiesa =

Italian fencer (born 1971)

Personal information
- Born: 5 August 1971 (age 54) Turin, Italy

Sport
- Sport: Fencing
Medal record
Women's fencing
Representing Italy
Olympic Games
Silver medal – second place	1996 Atlanta	Épée, team

Laura Chiesa (born 5 August 1971) is an Italian fencer. She won a silver medal in the women's team épée event at the 1996 Summer Olympics.
