= Michèle Wolf (fencer) =

Swiss fencer (born 1961)

Personal information
- Born: 22 January 1961 (age 65) Luxembourg City, Luxembourg

Sport
- Sport: Fencing

Michèle Wolf (born 22 January 1961) is a Swiss fencer. She competed in the women's individual and team épée events at the 1996 Summer Olympics.
