= Eva-Maria Ittner =

German fencer (born 1961)

Personal information
- Born: 21 September 1961 (age 64) Düsseldorf, West Germany

Sport
- Sport: Fencing

Eva-Maria Ittner (born 21 September 1961) is a German fencer. She competed in the women's individual and team épée events at the 1996 Summer Olympics.
