= Valérie Barlois-Mevel-Leroux =

French fencer (born 1969)

Valérie Barlois-Mevel-Leroux OLY
Personal information
- Born: 28 May 1969 (age 57) Melun, Seine-et-Marne, France

Sport
- Sport: Fencing
Medal record
Women's fencing
Representing France
Olympic Games
Gold medal – first place	1996 Atlanta	Épée, team
Silver medal – second place	1996 Atlanta	Épée, individual

Valérie Barlois

-Leroux (born 28 May 1969) is a French fencer. She won a gold medal in the women's team épée and a silver in the individual épée at the 1996 Summer Olympics.
