= Tímea Nagy =

Hungarian fencer

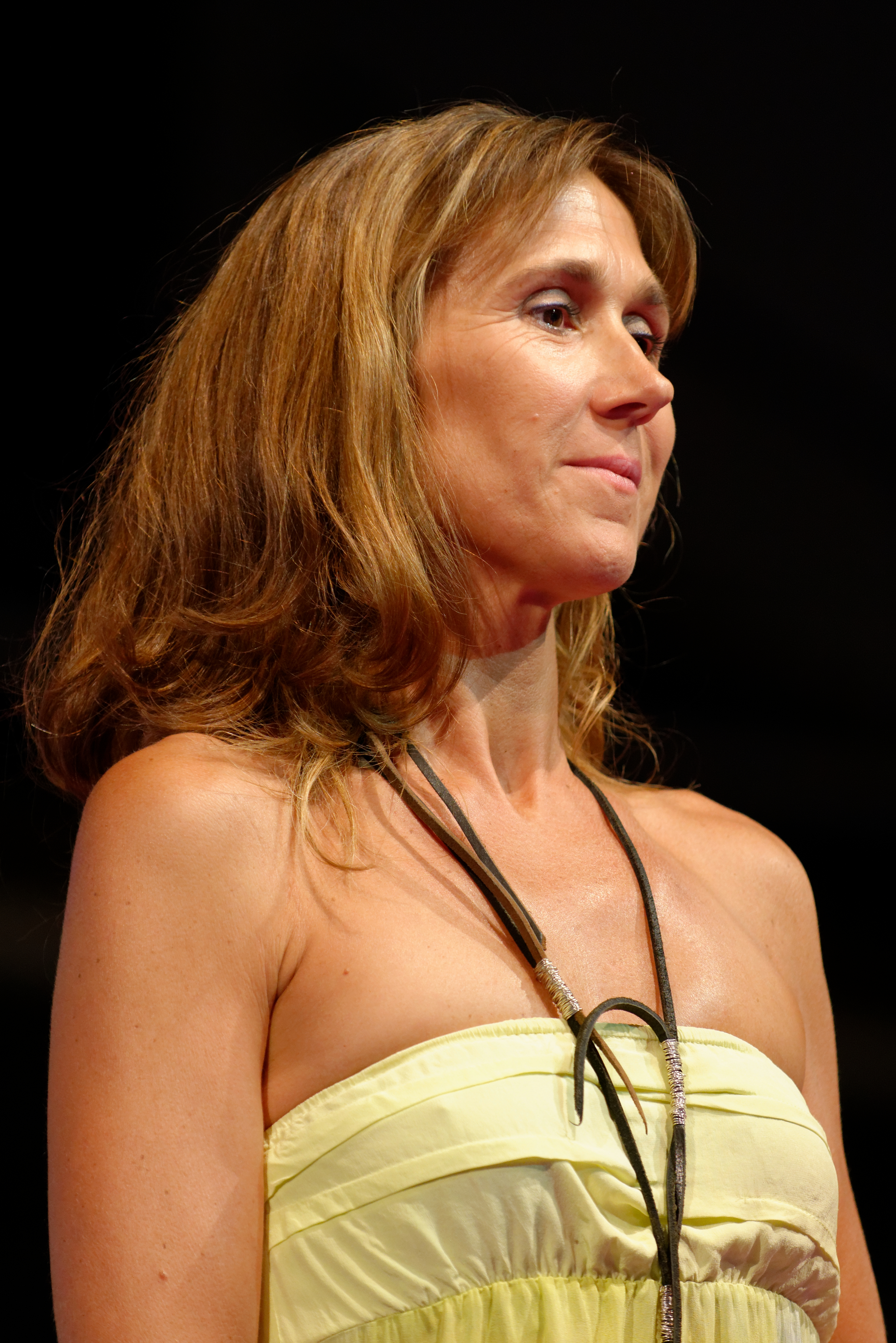
- Nagy in 2013

Personal information
- Born: 22 August 1970 (age 56) Budapest, Hungary
- Height: 1.73 m (5 ft 8 in)
- Weight: 65 kg (143 lb)

Fencing career
- Sport: Fencing
- Country: Hungary
- Weapon: épée
- Hand: Right-handed
- Club: Vasas (1980–1990); Bp. Honvéd (1991–2010)
- Head coach: Győző Kulcsár
Medal record
Women's fencing
Representing Hungary
Event	1st	2nd	3rd
Olympic Games	2	0	0
World Championships	6	0	2
European Championships	1	2	1
Universiade	6	0	0
Total	15	2	3
Olympic Games
Gold medal – first place	2000 Sydney	Individual épée
Gold medal – first place	2004 Athens	Individual épée
World Championships
Gold medal – first place	1992 Havana	Team épée
Gold medal – first place	1993 Essen	Team épée
Gold medal – first place	1995 The Hague	Team épée
Gold medal – first place	1997 Cape Town	Team épée
Gold medal – first place	1999 Seoul	Team épée
Gold medal – first place	2006 Turin	Individual épée
Bronze medal – third place	2003 Havana	Team épée
Summer Universiade
Gold medal – first place	1989 Duisburg	Team épée
Gold medal – first place	1993 Buffalo	Team épée
Gold medal – first place	1995 Fukuoka	Individual épée
Gold medal – first place	1995 Fukuoka	Team épée
Gold medal – first place	1997 Catania	Individual épée
Gold medal – first place	1997 Catania	Team épée

Tímea Nagy (born 22 August 1970) is a Hungarian right-handed épée fencer, three-time Olympian, 2006 individual world champion, and two-time Olympic champion.

== Awards ==
- Hungarian Fencer of the Year (3): 2000, 2004, 2006
- National Defence awards, I.class (2005)
- Hungarian Sportswoman of the Year (1) - votes of sports journalists: 2006
- Hungarian Athlete of the Year (1) - the National Sports Association (NSSZ) awards: 2006
- Príma award (2007)
- Women in sport award (2011)
- Csík Ferenc award (2007)
- Member of International Fencing Federation (FIE) Hall of Fame (2013)

Orders and special awards

- Order of Merit of the Republic of Hungary – Officer's Cross (2000)
- Order of Merit of the Republic of Hungary – Commander's Cross (2004)

Awards
Preceded by Zsuzsanna Vörös	Hungarian Sportswoman of The Year; 2006	Succeeded by Ágnes Szávay
