= Sabine Bau =

German fencer (born 1969)

Personal information
- Born: 19 July 1969 (age 57) Würzburg, West Germany
- Height: 1.80 m (5 ft 11 in)
- Weight: 66 kg (146 lb)

Sport
- Sport: Fencing
- Club: FC Tauberbischofsheim
Medal record
Representing West Germany and Germany
Women's Fencing
Olympic Games
Gold medal – first place	1988 Seoul	Foil, team
Silver medal – second place	1988 Seoul	Foil
Silver medal – second place	1992 Barcelona	Foil, team
Bronze medal – third place	1996 Atlanta	Foil, team
Bronze medal – third place	2000 Sydney	Foil team

Sabine Bau (born 19 July 1969) is a former German foil fencer.

== Biography ==
Sabine Bau fought for the Fencing-Club Tauberbischofsheim. She won five medals at four different Olympic Games between 1988 and 2000.
