= Pavel Kolobkov =

Russian fencer

- Павел Колобков
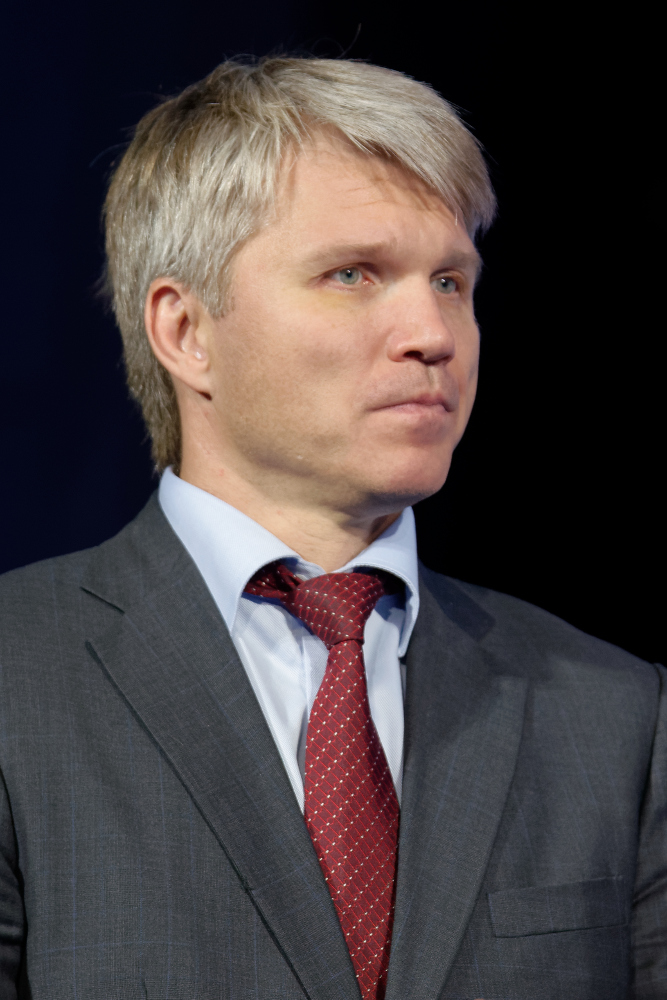
- Kolobkov in 2015

Russian Minister of Sport
- In office 19 October 2016 – 15 January 2020; Acting: 15 – 21 January 2020
- President: Vladimir Putin
- Prime Minister: Dmitry Medvedev
- Deputy: Pavel Novikov; Marina Tomilova; Igor Sidorkevich; Natalya Parshikova; Sergey Kosilov; Nadezhda Erastova
- Preceded by: Vitaly Mutko
- Succeeded by: Oleg Matytsin

Russian Deputy Minister of Sport
- In office 18 June 2012 – 19 October 2016 Serving with Yuri Nagornykh, Pavel Novikov, Sergey Shelpakov, Natalya Parshikova and Marina Tomilova
- President: Vladimir Putin
- Prime Minister: Dmitry Medvedev
- Preceded by: position established
- Succeeded by: Pavel Novikov; Natalya Parshikova; Marina Tomilova

Russian Deputy Minister of Sport, Tourism and Youth Policy
- In office 8 October 2010 – 18 June 2012 Serving with Yuri Nagornykh, Pavel Novikov, Oleg Rozhnov and Nadezhda Nazina
- President: Dmitry Medvedev; Vladimir Putin
- Prime Minister: Vladimir Putin; Dmitry Medvedev
- Succeeded by: position abolished

Personal details
- Born: Pavel Anatolyevich Kolobkov; 22 September 1969 (age 57) Moscow, Russian SFSR, Soviet Union
- Party: United Russia
- Education: Moscow State Academy of Law
- Fencing career
- Height: 1.82 m (6 ft 0 in)
- Weight: 75 kg (165 lb)
- Sport: Fencing
- Country: Soviet Union; Russia
- Weapon: Épée
- Hand: Right-handed
- Club: CSKA
- Retired: 2008
- FIE ranking: archive
Medal record
Men's épée fencing
Olympic Games
Winner	1	(1 individual)
Runner-up	2	(1 individual)
Third place	3	(2 individual)
World Championships
Winner	5	(4 individual)
Runner-up	2	(1 individual)
Third place	3	(2 individual)
European Championships
Winner	2	(2 individual)
Runner-up	4	(3 individual)
Third place	5	(4 individual)

Pavel Anatolyevich Kolobkov (Russian: Павел Анатольевич Колобков; born 22 September 1969) is a Russian (and formerly Soviet) retired épée fencer. He won one gold, two silver and three bronze medals at five Olympic Games from 1988 to 2004. Kolobkov served as Russia's representative to the World Anti-Doping Agency (WADA) until 2015 when WADA declared the Russian Anti-Doping Agency to be non-compliant, and he was barred from serving as a representative to WADA. He served as the Russian Minister of Sport from 2016 to 2020, when he was dismissed from the position by President Putin. He also previously served as the Russian Deputy Minister of Sport as well as the Russian Deputy Minister of Sport, Tourism and Youth Policy.

== Biography ==
=== Early years ===
Kolobkov was born in Moscow. In his career he won 27 individual and team medals between Olympic Games, World and European Championships. He was appointed as a Russian Deputy Minister of Sport, Tourism and Youth Policy on 8 October 2010 by Russian Prime Minister Vladimir Putin. He was appointed as the head of the Russian 2012 London Summer Olympics delegation on 9 August 2011. On 18 June 2012, he was appointed as the Russian Deputy Minister of Sports. He was appointed as a Class 3 State Advisor of the Russian Federation on 7 October 2013.

=== World Anti-Doping Agency representative ===
Kolobkov also served as Russia's representative to the World Anti-Doping Agency (WADA). He unsuccessfully denied WADA's finding that Russia was falsifying laboratory doping data, and was criticized by Russia's top athletes for endangering their careers. After Russia was accused of doping, Kolobkov provided WADA with fresh data, but it only revealed further manipulation.

His last meeting with the organization was on 18 November 2015, when WADA declared the Russian Anti-Doping Agency to be non-compliant. As a result, he lost his position as a representative to WADA in January 2016, and was barred from serving on the organization's Foundation Board.

WADA also ended up barring Russia from the Olympics and other international competition for four years for its doping. Jonathan Taylor, a British lawyer who wrote the report proposing the sanctions, which were approved unanimously by the WADA's board, said of Kolbokov: "I don’t know if he is corrupt or incompetent."

=== Russian Minister of Sport ===
He was appointed as a Class 2 State Advisor of the Russian Federation on 11 August 2016. On 19 October, he was appointed as the Russian Minister of Sport.

On 15 January 2020, he lost his job, as he was dismissed and replaced as Russian Sports Minister by President Putin.

=== Gazprom Neft official ===
In March 2020, Kolobkov was appointed as a board member and the deputy chief executive officer for Federal Government Relations by Gazprom Neft.

== Achievements ==
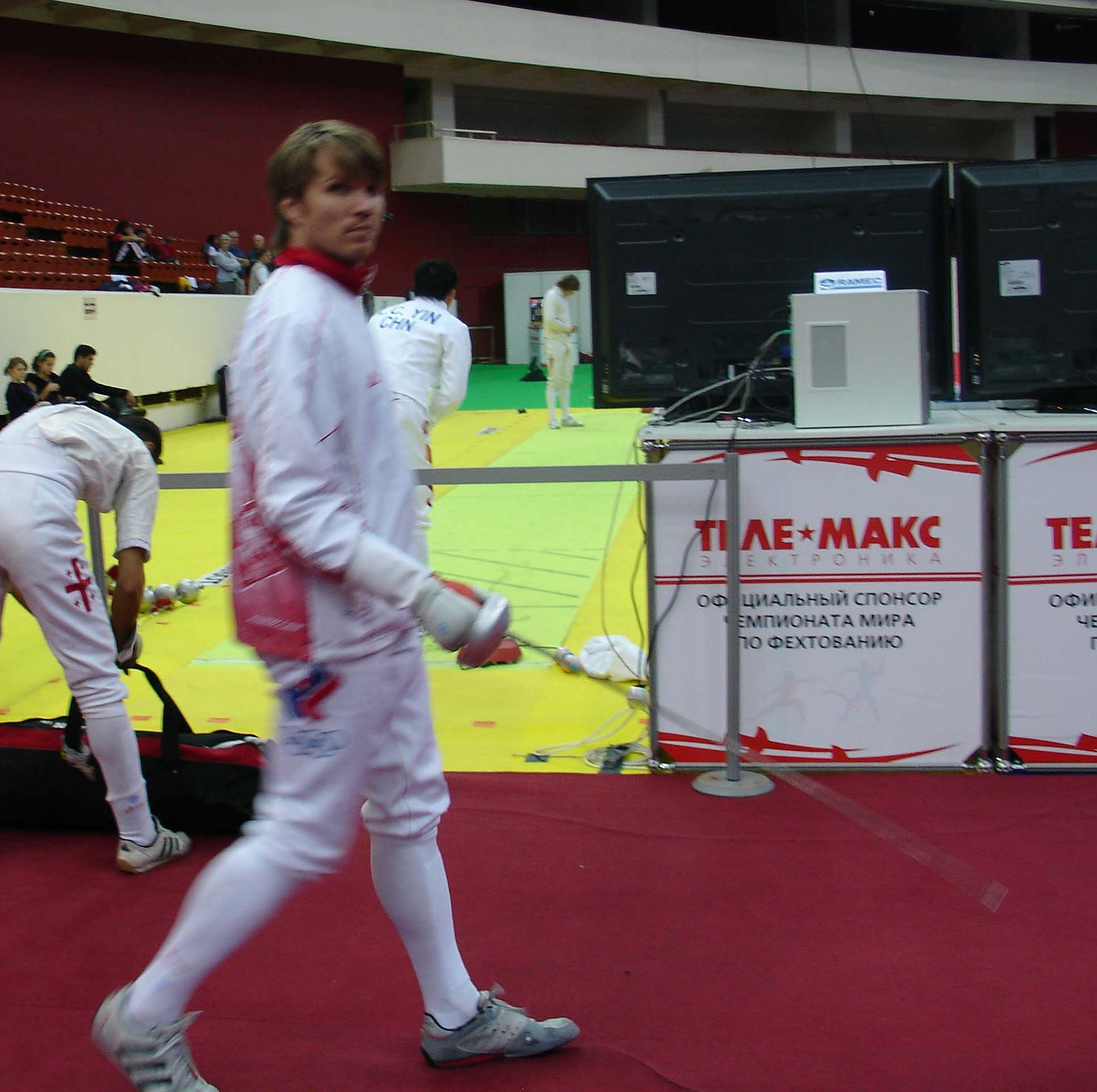
Kolobkov at the 2007 World Fencing Championships

Olympic Games

- Épée individual (2000)
- Épée individual (1992) and Épée team (1996)
- Épée individual (2004) and Épée team (1988, 1992)

World Championships

- Épée individual (1993, 1994, 2002, 2005) and Épée team (2003)
- Épée individual (1997) and Épée team (2002)
- Épée individual (1989, 1999) and Épée team (1988)

European Championships

- Épée individual (1996, 2000)
- Épée individual (2002, 2003, 2005) and Épée team (2006)
- Épée individual (1999, 2001, 2004, 2006) and Épée team (1998)

Fencing World Cup

- Épée (1999)

=== Awards and honors ===
- Order of Honour – Awarded on 19 April 2001
- Awarded the honorary rank of colonel by the Russian Armed Forces on 20 November 2004.
- Merited Master of Sports – Received in 1992
- Medal of the Order "For Merit to the Fatherland" 1st and 2nd class
- Russian Federation Presidential Certificate of Honour

== See also ==
- Multiple medallist at the World Fencing Championships
