= Claudia Bokel =

German épée fencer

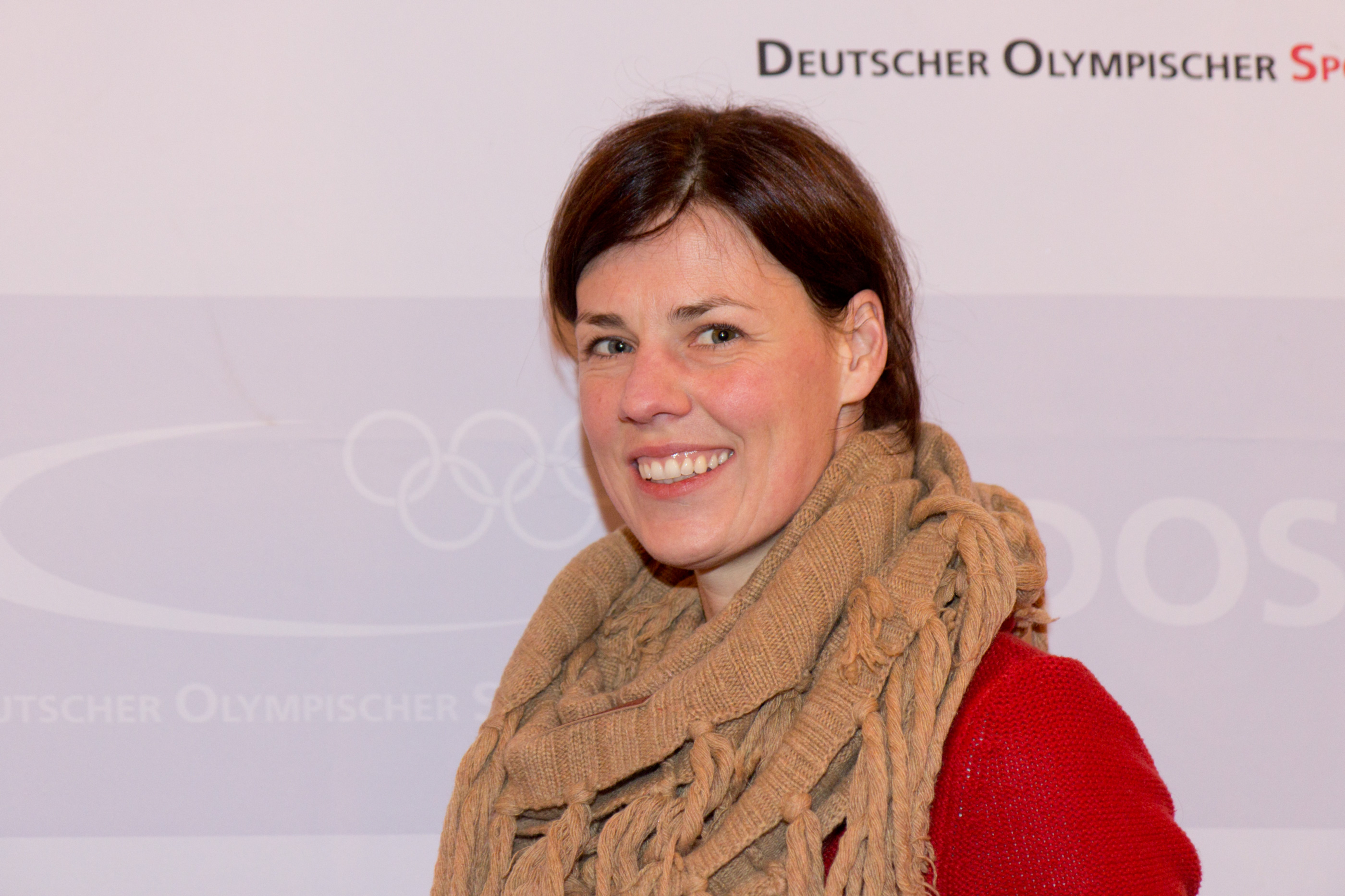

Personal information
- Born: 30 August 1973 (age 52) Ter Apel, Netherlands

Sport
- Sport: Fencing
Medal record
Women's fencing
Representing Germany
Olympic Games
Silver medal – second place	2004 Athens	Épée Team

Claudia Bokel (born 30 August 1973, in Ter Apel, the Netherlands) is a Dutch-German épée fencer and sports advisor.

== Biography ==
Claudia Bokel fought for the Fencing-Club Tauberbischofsheim. At the 2004 Summer Olympics, she won the silver medal in the épée competition with her teammates, Britta Heidemann and Imke Duplitzer. She also competed at the 1996 and 2000 Summer Olympics.

She won a gold medal at the 2001 World Fencing Championships and at the 2006 European Seniors Fencing Championship épée event. During the 2006 World Fencing Championships, she won the bronze medal after beating Romania in the épée team event together with her teammates Imke Duplitzer, Britta Heidemann and Marijana Markovic.

In August 2008, she was elected as a member of the International Olympic Committee and the IOC Athletes' Commission by the 120th IOC Session. After her 8-year term ended in 2016, she could not be proposed as an IOC Individual Member as her teammate Britta Heidemann was in the running for the next term.
