= Gyöngyi Szalay-Horváth =

Hungarian fencer

Personal information
- Born: 24 March 1968 Tapolca, Hungary
- Died: 30 December 2017 (aged 49) Veszprém, Hungary

Sport
- Sport: Fencing
Medal record
Women's fencing
Representing Hungary
Olympic Games
Bronze medal – third place	1996 Atlanta	Épée, individual

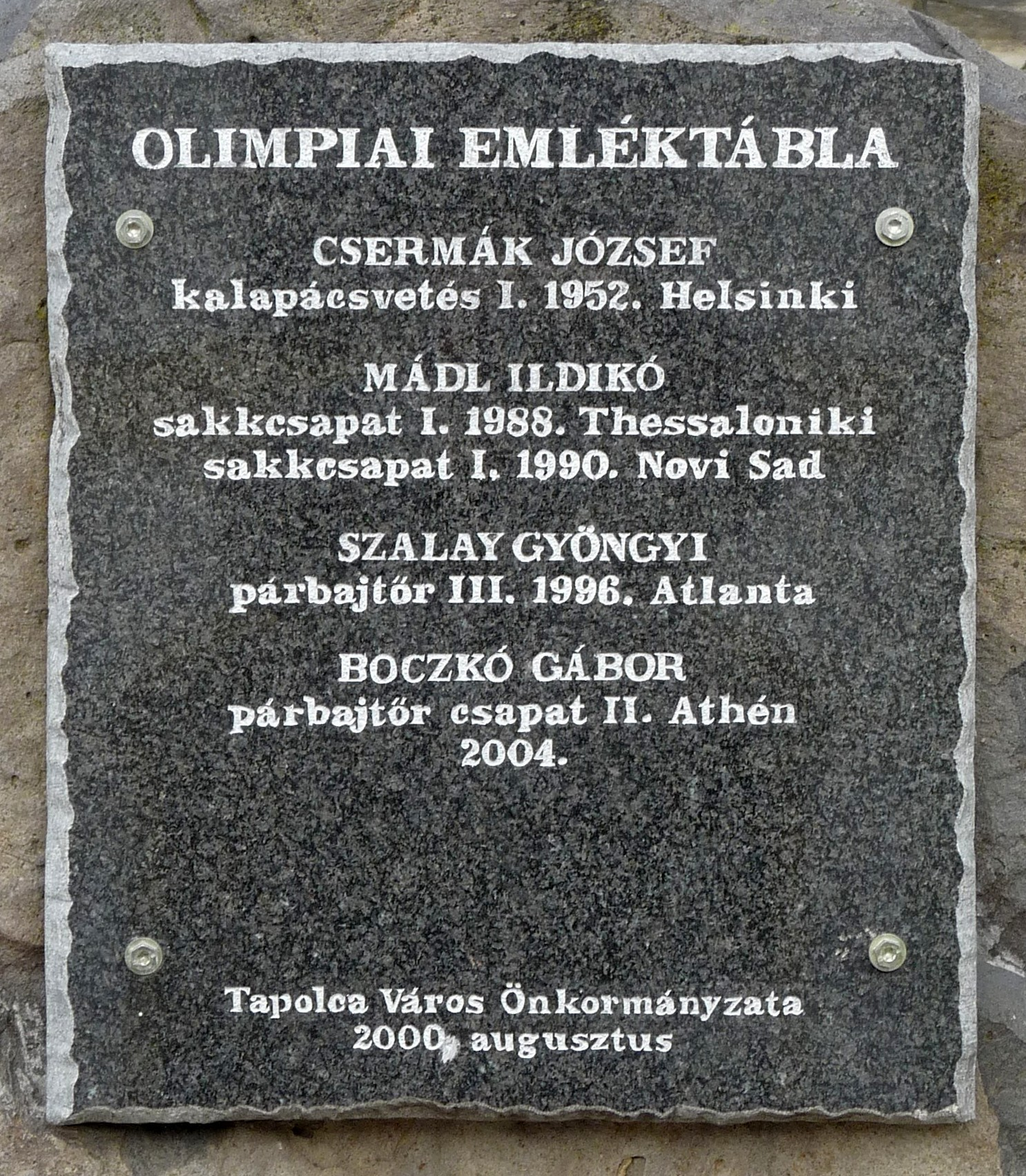
Plaque commemorating Szalay’s third place in Atlanta 1996

Gyöngyi Szalay-Horváth (24 March 1968 – 30 December 2017) was a Hungarian fencer. She won a bronze medal in the women's individual épée event at the 1996 Summer Olympics.
