= Fencing at the 1992 Summer Olympics – Men's sabre =

Olympic fencing tournament

Men's sabre at the Games of the XXV Olympiad
- Venue: Palau de la Metal·lúrgia
- Dates: 2 August 1992
- Competitors: 44 from 19 nations

Medalists
1st place, gold medalist(s)		Bence Szabó	Hungary
2nd place, silver medalist(s)		Marco Marin	Italy
3rd place, bronze medalist(s)		Jean-François Lamour	France

The men's sabre was one of eight fencing events on the fencing at the 1992 Summer Olympics programme. It was the twenty-second appearance of the event. The competition was held on 2 August 1992. 44 fencers from 19 nations competed. Nations had been limited to three fencers each since 1928. The event was won by Bence Szabó of Hungary, the nation's first victory in the men's sabre since 1964 (the last of its nine-Games winning streak) and 12th overall. Marco Marin took silver while Jean-François Lamour finished with the bronze. Lamour, who had won gold in 1984 and 1988, was unable to win a third title but still became only the second man with three medals in the event (after Aladár Gerevich earned one of each color in 1936, 1948, and 1952). Marin had also finished second in 1984; he was the 12th man with multiple medals in the sabre.

== Background ==
This was the 22nd appearance of the event, which is the only fencing event to have been held at every Summer Olympics. Six of the quarterfinalists from 1988 returned: two-time gold medalist Jean-François Lamour of France, silver medalist Janusz Olech of Poland, bronze medalist Giovanni Scalzo of Italy, and fifth-place finishers György Nébald of Hungary and Felix Becker and Jürgen Nolte of West Germany. Marco Marin, 1984 silver medalist who had not advanced through the knockout rounds in 1988, also returned. The three world championships since the previous Games had been won by Grigory Kiriyenko of the Soviet Union (1989 and 1991) and Nébald (1990).

Saudi Arabia made its debut in the men's sabre; some former Soviet republics competed as the Unified Team. Italy made its 20th appearance in the event, most of any nation, having missed the inaugural 1896 event and the 1904 Olympics.

== Competition format ==
The 1992 tournament used a three-phase format roughly similar to prior years in consisting of a group phase, a double-elimination phase, and a single-elimination phase, but each phase was very different from previous formats.

The first phase was a single round (vs. 3 rounds in 1988) round-robin pool play format; each fencer in a pool faced each other fencer in that pool once. There were 7 pools with 6 or 7 fencers each. The fencers' ranks within the pool were ignored; the overall winning percentage (with touch differential and then touches against used as tie-breakers) were used to rank the fencers. The top 34 advanced to the second phase, while the other fencers were eliminated.

The second phase was a modified, truncated double-elimination tournament. 30 fencers received a bye to the second round (round of 32), while the 4 fencers ranked 31–34 played in the round of 64. Fencers losing in the round of 64 were eliminated, while the remaining rounds were double elimination via repechages. The repechages (but not the main brackets) used a complicated reseeding mechanism. Ultimately, the 4 fencers remaining undefeated after the round of 8 advanced to the quarterfinals along with 4 fencers who advanced through the repechages after one loss.

The final phase was a single elimination tournament with quarterfinals, semifinals, and a final and bronze medal match.

All bouts were to 5 touches. In the second and third phases, matches were best-of-three bouts.

== Schedule ==
All times are Central European Summer Time (UTC+2)

Date	Time	Round
Sunday, 2 August 1992		Group round Elimination round Final round

== Results ==
=== Group round ===
Fencers were ranked by win percent, then touch differential, then touches against. This ranking, with adjustments to ensure that no two fencers of the same nation were in the same bracket (noted in parentheses), was used to seed the elimination round brackets.

Rank	Fencer	Nation	Pool	Rank	Wins	Losses	Win %	TF	TA	TF - TA	Notes
1	György Nébald	Hungary	6	1	6	0	1.000	30	11	19	Q
2	Giovanni Scalzo	Italy	7	1	5	1	.833	29	17	12	Q
3	Aleksandr Shirshov	Unified Team	4	1	4	1	.800	24	10	14	Q
4	Jörg Kempenich	Germany	1	1	4	1	.800	23	14	9	Q
5	Jean-François Lamour	France	1	2	4	1	.800	24	16	8	Q
6	Antonio García	Spain	4	2	4	1	.800	22	15	7	Q
7	Felix Becker	Germany	3	1	4	1	.800	24	17	7	Q
8	Vilmoș Szabo	Romania	2	1	4	1	.800	24	18	6	Q
9	Ferdinando Meglio	Italy	3	2	4	1	.800	22	18	4	Q
10	Bence Szabó	Hungary	5	1	3	1	.750	19	12	7	Q
11	Jean-Philippe Daurelle	France	5	2	3	1	.750	17	12	5	Q
12	Marco Marin	Italy	6	2	4	2	.667	26	15	11	Q
13 (15)	Franck Ducheix	France	7	2	4	2	.667	27	20	7	Q
14 (13)	Grigory Kiriyenko	Unified Team	6	3	4	2	.667	24	21	3	Q
15 (14)	Zisis Babanasis	Greece	7	3	4	2	.667	23	21	2	Q
16	Robert Kościelniakowski	Poland	1	3	3	2	.600	20	14	6	Q
17 (19)	Csaba Köves	Hungary	4	3	3	2	.600	21	16	5	Q
18 (17)	Jürgen Nolte	Germany	2	2	3	2	.600	23	18	5	Q
19 (18)	Jean-Marie Banos	Canada	2	3	3	2	.600	22	20	2	Q
20	Janusz Olech	Poland	3	3	3	2	.600	20	19	1	Q
21 (22)	Marek Gniewkowski	Poland	2	4	3	2	.600	19	22	-3	Q
22 (21)	Raúl Peinador	Spain	6	4	3	3	.500	24	22	2	Q
23	Zheng Zhaokang	China	6	5	3	3	.500	23	22	1	Q
24	Heorhiy Pohosov	Unified Team	7	4	3	3	.500	24	23	1	Q
25 (26)	Alexandru Chiculiţă	Romania	5	3	2	2	.500	18	18	0	Q
26 (25)	Mike Lofton	United States	7	5	3	3	.500	21	23	-2	Q
27	Kirk Zavieh	Great Britain	5	4	2	2	.500	14	17	-3	Q
28	Yang Zhen	China	3	4	2	3	.400	19	19	0	Q
29	Ian Williams	Great Britain	1	4	2	3	.400	20	20	0	Q
30 (31)	Gary Fletcher	Great Britain	4	4	2	3	.400	15	16	-1	Q
31 (30)	Daniel Grigore	Romania	1	5	2	3	.400	18	19	-1	Q
32	Jean-Paul Banos	Canada	3	5	2	3	.400	18	20	-2	Q
33	Steve Mormando	United States	2	5	2	3	.400	19	21	-2	Q
34	Bob Cottingham	United States	4	5	2	3	.400	12	19	-7	Q
35	Tony Plourde	Canada	7	6	2	4	.333	25	25	0	
36	Dario Torrente	South Africa	6	6	1	5	.167	11	29	-18	
37	Ricardo Menalda	Brazil	2	6	0	5	.000	17	25	-8	
38	Jia Guihua	China	5	5	0	4	.000	11	20	-9	
39	Esteban Mullins	Costa Rica	3	6	0	5	.000	15	25	-10	
40	Luís Silva	Portugal	4	6	0	5	.000	7	25	-18	
41	Hiroshi Hashimoto	Japan	6	7	0	6	.000	12	30	-18	
42	Hein van Garderen	South Africa	7	7	0	6	.000	10	30	-20	
43	Sami Al-Baker	Saudi Arabia	1	6	0	5	.000	3	25	-22	
44	José Luis Álvarez	Spain	5	6	Did not start						

=== Elimination rounds ===
==== Main brackets ====
===== Main bracket 1 =====
Mormando was eliminated after the round of 64. The losers in the round of 32 faced off, with Kościelniakowski beating Nébald and Pohosov beating V. Szabo to advance to the repechage. The losers of the round of 16, J-P Banos and Lofton, advanced directly to the first round of the repechage. Nolte, having lost in the round of 8, went to the third round of the repechage. Meglio won the bracket, advancing to the quarterfinals.

Round of 64
33	Steve Mormando (USA)	2	2
32	Jean-Paul Banos (CAN)	5	5

Round of 32
1	György Nébald (HUN)	5	5
32	Jean-Paul Banos (CAN)	6	6
17	Jürgen Nolte (GER)	6	2	5
16	Robert Kościelniakowski (POL)	5	5	2
9	Ferdinando Meglio (ITA)	5	5
24	Heorhiy Pohosov (EUN)	1	1
25	Mike Lofton (USA)	5	5
8	Vilmoș Szabo (ROU)	2	2

Round of 16
32	Jean-Paul Banos (CAN)	2	3
17	Jürgen Nolte (GER)	5	5
9	Ferdinando Meglio (ITA)	5	6
25	Mike Lofton (USA)	2	5

Round of 8
17	Jürgen Nolte (GER)	3	5
9	Ferdinando Meglio (ITA)	5	6

====== Repechage qualifiers 1 ======
Repechage qualifier
1	György Nébald (HUN)	3	1
16	Robert Kościelniakowski (POL)	5	5

Repechage qualifier
24	Heorhiy Pohosov (EUN)	5	6
8	Vilmoș Szabo (ROU)	3	5

===== Main bracket 2 =====
The losers in the round of 32 faced off, with Yang beating Peinador and Olech beating Williams to advance to the repechage. The losers of the round of 16, Marin and Kempenich, advanced directly to the first round of the repechage. Kiriyenko, having lost in the round of 8, went to the third round of the repechage. Lamour won the bracket, advancing to the quarterfinals.

Round of 64

Round of 32
5	Jean-François Lamour (FRA)	5	5
28	Yang Zhen (CHN)	1	3
21	Raúl Peinador (ESP)	3	5
12	Marco Marin (ITA)	5	6
13	Grigory Kiriyenko (EUN)	4	5	6
20	Janusz Olech (POL)	6	2	4
29	Ian Williams (GBR)	2	1
4	Jörg Kempenich (GER)	5	5

Round of 16
5	Jean-François Lamour (FRA)	6	5
12	Marco Marin (ITA)	4	2
13	Grigory Kiriyenko (EUN)	5	1	5
4	Jörg Kempenich (GER)	3	5	1

Round of 8
5	Jean-François Lamour (FRA)	5	5	5
13	Grigory Kiriyenko (EUN)	2	6	3

====== Repechage qualifiers 2 ======
Repechage qualifier
28	Yang Zhen (CHN)	6	5
16	Raúl Peinador (ESP)	5	4

Repechage qualifier
20	Janusz Olech (POL)	3	5	5
29	Ian Williams (GBR)	5	2	1

===== Main bracket 3 =====
The losers in the round of 32 faced off, with Yang beating Babanasis and Daurelle beating Zavieh to advance to the repechage. The losers of the round of 16, Grigore and Gniewkowski, advanced directly to the first round of the repechage. Köves, having lost in the round of 8, went to the third round of the repechage. García won the bracket, advancing to the quarterfinals.

Round of 64

Round of 32
3	Aleksandr Shirshov (EUN)	6	5
30	Daniel Grigore (ROU)	5	2
19	Csaba Köves (HUN)	1	6	5
14	Zisis Babanasis (GRE)	5	4	2
11	Jean-Philippe Daurelle (FRA)	5	4
22	Marek Gniewkowski (POL)	6	6
27	Kirk Zavieh (GBR)	3	4
6	Antonio García (ESP)	5	6

Round of 16
3	Aleksandr Shirshov (EUN)	4	2
19	Csaba Köves (HUN)	6	5
22	Marek Gniewkowski (POL)	5	3
6	Antonio García (ESP)	6	5

Round of 8
19	Csaba Köves (HUN)	2	5	3
6	Antonio García (ESP)	5	2	5

====== Repechage qualifiers 3 ======
Repechage qualifier
30	Daniel Grigore (ROU)	5	5
14	Zisis Babanasis (GRE)	2	1

Repechage qualifier
11	Jean-Philippe Daurelle (FRA)	5	5
27	Kirk Zavieh (GBR)	1	3

===== Main bracket 4 =====
Fletcher was eliminated after the round of 64. The losers in the round of 32 faced off, with Zheng beating Chiculiţă and Cottingham beating J-M Banos to advance to the repechage. The losers of the round of 16, Becker and Ducheix, advanced directly to the first round of the repechage. B. Szabó, having lost in the round of 8, went to the third round of the repechage. Scalzo won the bracket, advancing to the quarterfinals.

Round of 64
31	Gary Fletcher (GBR)	2	2
34	Bob Cottingham (USA)	5	5

Round of 32
7	Felix Becker (GER)	3	5	5
26	Alexandru Chiculiţă (ROU)	5	2	1
23	Zheng Zhaokang (CHN)	0	2
10	Bence Szabó (HUN)	5	5
15	Franck Ducheix (FRA)	5	6
18	Jean-Marie Banos (CAN)	1	5
34	Bob Cottingham (USA)	2	3
2	Giovanni Scalzo (ITA)	5	5

Round of 16
7	Felix Becker (GER)	3	5	2
10	Bence Szabó (HUN)	5	2	5
15	Franck Ducheix (FRA)	0	5	2
2	Giovanni Scalzo (ITA)	5	2	5

Round of 8
10	Bence Szabó (HUN)	4	5
2	Giovanni Scalzo (ITA)	6	6

====== Repechage qualifiers 4 ======
Repechage qualifier
26	Alexandru Chiculiţă (ROU)	6	4	4
23	Zheng Zhaokang (CHN)	4	6	6

Repechage qualifier
18	Jean-Marie Banos (CAN)	5	1
34	Bob Cottingham (USA)	6	5

==== Repechage rounds 1 and 2 ====
The fencers were reseeded: the eight fencers who had lost in the round of 16 were reseeded as 1–8 while the eight fencers who had lost in the round of 32 but won the repechage qualifiers were reseeded as 9–16. For example, original seed #11 Daurelle was reseeded as #9 because he was the top-seeded fencer who had advanced through the repechage qualifiers. Original seeds are shown in parentheses in the brackets.

R1 seed	O seed	Fencer	Nation
From round of 16
1	3	Aleksandr Shirshov	Unified Team
2	4	Jörg Kempenich	Germany
3	7	Felix Becker	Germany
4	12	Marco Marin	Italy
5	15	Franck Ducheix	France
6	22	Marek Gniewkowski	Poland
7	25	Mike Lofton	United States
8	32	Jean-Paul Banos	Canada
From round of 32 and qualifiers
9	11	Jean-Philippe Daurelle	France
10	16	Robert Kościelniakowski	Poland
11	20	Janusz Olech	Poland
12	23	Zheng Zhaokang	China
13	24	Heorhiy Pohosov	Unified Team
14	28	Yang Zhen	China
15	30	Daniel Grigore	Romania
16	34	Bob Cottingham	United States

===== Repechage rounds 1 and 2 bracket 1 =====
Repechage round 1					Repechage round 2
1 (3)	Aleksandr Shirshov (EUN)	2	5	5
16 (34)	Bob Cottingham (USA)	5	1	3	1 (3)	Aleksandr Shirshov (EUN)	4	6	4
9 (11)	Jean-Philippe Daurelle (FRA)	5	5		9 (11)	Jean-Philippe Daurelle (FRA)	6	5	6
8 (32)	Jean-Paul Banos (CAN)	3	3

===== Repechage rounds 1 and 2 bracket 2 =====
Repechage round 1					Repechage round 2
5 (15)	Franck Ducheix (FRA)	5	3	5
12 (23)	Zheng Zhaokang (CHN)	0	5	6	12 (23)	Zheng Zhaokang (CHN)	0	1
13 (24)	Heorhiy Pohosov (EUN)	0	5	4	4 (12)	Marco Marin (ITA)	5	5
4 (12)	Marco Marin (ITA)	5	2	6

===== Repechage rounds 1 and 2 bracket 3 =====
Repechage round 1				Repechage round 2
3 (7)	Felix Becker (GER)	5	5
14 (28)	Yang Zhen (CHN)	2	3	3 (7)	Felix Becker (GER)	1	6	2
11 (20)	Janusz Olech (POL)	5	5	11 (20)	Janusz Olech (POL)	5	4	5
6 (22)	Marek Gniewkowski (POL)	2	2

===== Repechage rounds 1 and 2 bracket 4 =====
Repechage round 1					Repechage round 2
7 (25)	Mike Lofton (USA)	5	4	5
10 (16)	Robert Kościelniakowski (POL)	1	6	6	10 (16)	Robert Kościelniakowski (POL)	6	5	6
15 (30)	Daniel Grigore (ROU)	5	5		15 (30)	Daniel Grigore (ROU)	5	6	5
2 (4)	Jörg Kempenich (GER)	2	1

==== Repechage round 3 ====
The fencers were reseeded again. Seeds 1–4 were given to round 8 losers, based on their original seeds (excluding adjustments to avoid having multiple fencers from the same nation in a bracket, which affected Köves and Nolte). Seeds 5–8 were given to the winners of the second round of the repechage, based on their original seeds.

R3 seed	R1 seed	O seed	Fencer	Nation
From round of 8
1	–	10	Bence Szabó	Hungary
2	–	13	Grigory Kiriyenko	Unified Team
3	–	19	Csaba Köves	Hungary
4	–	17	Jürgen Nolte	Germany
From repechage round 2
5	9	11	Jean-Philippe Daurelle	France
6	4	12	Marco Marin	Italy
7	10	16	Robert Kościelniakowski	Poland
8	11	20	Janusz Olech	Poland

===== Repechage round 3 bracket 1 =====
Repechage round 3
1 (10)	Bence Szabó (HUN)	5	6
8 (20)	Janusz Olech (POL)	1	4

===== Repechage round 3 bracket 2 =====
Repechage round 3
5 (11)	Jean-Philippe Daurelle (FRA)	2	4
4 (17)	Jürgen Nolte (GER)	5	6

===== Repechage round 3 bracket 3 =====
Repechage round 3
3 (19)	Csaba Köves (HUN)	3	3
6 (12)	Marco Marin (ITA)	5	5

===== Repechage round 3 bracket 4 =====
Repechage round 3
7 (16)	Robert Kościelniakowski (POL)	2	5	4
2 (13)	Grigory Kiriyenko (EUN)	5	1	6

=== Final rounds ===
The fencers were reseeded a final time. Seeds 1–4 were given to the round of 8 winners, based on their original seeds. Seeds 5–8 were given to the winners of the third round of the repechage, based on their original seeds.

F seed	R3 seed	R1 seed	O seed	Fencer	Nation
From round of 8
1	–	–	2	Giovanni Scalzo	Italy
2	–	–	5	Jean-François Lamour	France
3	–	–	6	Antonio García	Spain
4	–	–	9	Ferdinando Meglio	Italy
From repechage round 3
5	1	–	10	Bence Szabó	Hungary
6	6	4	12	Marco Marin	Italy
7	7	10	16	Robert Kościelniakowski	Poland
8	4	–	17	Jürgen Nolte	Germany

Quarterfinals
1 (2)	Giovanni Scalzo (ITA)	2	5	5
8 (17)	Jürgen Nolte (GER)	5	3	3
5 (10)	Bence Szabó (HUN)	5	5
4 (9)	Ferdinando Meglio (ITA)	2	0
3 (6)	Antonio García (ESP)	3	5	2
6 (12)	Marco Marin (ITA)	5	2	5
7 (16)	Robert Kościelniakowski (POL)	2	5	4
2 (5)	Jean-François Lamour (FRA)	5	1	6

Semifinals
1 (2)	Giovanni Scalzo (ITA)	3	5	4
5 (10)	Bence Szabó (HUN)	5	3	6
6 (12)	Marco Marin (ITA)	6	5
2 (5)	Jean-François Lamour (FRA)	4	3

Final
5 (10)	Bence Szabó (HUN)	5	5
6 (12)	Marco Marin (ITA)	1	1
Bronze match
1 (2)	Giovanni Scalzo (ITA)	5	5	1
2 (5)	Jean-François Lamour (FRA)	3	6	5

== Final classification ==
Fencer	Nation
Bence Szabó	Hungary
Marco Marin	Italy
Jean-François Lamour	France
Giovanni Scalzo	Italy
Antonio García	Spain
Ferdinando Meglio	Italy
Robert Kościelniakowski	Poland
Jürgen Nolte	Germany
Jean-Philippe Daurelle	France
Grigory Kiriyenko	Unified Team
Csaba Köves	Hungary
Janusz Olech	Poland
Aleksandr Shirshov	Unified Team
Felix Becker	Germany
Zheng Zhaokang	China
Daniel Grigore	Romania
Jörg Kempenich	Germany
Franck Ducheix	France
Marek Gniewkowski	Poland
Heorhiy Pohosov	Unified Team
Mike Lofton	United States
Yang Zhen	China
Jean-Paul Banos	Canada
Bob Cottingham	United States
György Nébald	Hungary
Vilmoș Szabo	Romania
Zisis Babanasis	Greece
Jean-Marie Banos	Canada
Raúl Peinador	Spain
Alexandru Chiculiţă	Romania
Kirk Zavieh	Great Britain
Ian Williams	Great Britain
Gary Fletcher	Great Britain
Steve Mormando	United States
Tony Plourde	Canada
Dario Torrente	South Africa
Ricardo Menalda	Brazil
Jia Guihua	China
Esteban Mullins	Costa Rica
Luís Silva	Portugal
Hiroshi Hashimoto	Japan
Hein van Garderen	South Africa
Sami Al-Baker	Saudi Arabia
José Luis Álvarez	Spain
