= Hungary at the 1992 Summer Olympics =

- IOC code: HUN
- NOC: Hungarian Olympic Committee

in Barcelona
- Competitors: 217 (159 men and 58 women) in 23 sports
- Flag bearer: Tibor Komáromi (wrestling)
- Medals Ranked 8th: Gold 11 Silver 12 Bronze 7 Total 30

Summer Olympics appearances (overview)
- 1896; 1900; 1904; 1908; 1912; 1920; 1924; 1928; 1932; 1936; 1948; 1952; 1956; 1960; 1964; 1968; 1972; 1976; 1980; 1984; 1988; 1992; 1996; 2000; 2004; 2008; 2012; 2016; 2020; 2024

Other related appearances
- 1906 Intercalated Games

Hungary competed at the 1992 Summer Olympics in Barcelona, Spain. 217 competitors, 159 men and 58 women, took part in 156 events in 23 sports.

== Medalists ==
Medal	Name	Sport	Event	Date
Gold	Krisztina Egerszegi	Swimming	Women's 400 metre individual medley	26 July
Gold	Tamás Darnyi	Swimming	Men's 400 metre individual medley	27 July
Gold	Krisztina Egerszegi	Swimming	Women's 100 metre backstroke	28 July
Gold	Attila Repka	Wrestling	Men's Greco-Roman 68 kg	28 July
Gold	Antal Kovács	Judo	Men's 95 kg	28 July
Gold	Péter Farkas	Wrestling	Men's Greco-Roman 82 kg	30 July
Gold	Krisztina Egerszegi	Swimming	Women's 200 metre backstroke	31 July
Gold	Tamás Darnyi	Swimming	Men's 200 metre individual medley	31 July
Gold	Henrietta Ónodi	Gymnastics	Women's vault	1 August
Gold	Bence Szabó	Fencing	Men's sabre	2 August
Gold	Kinga Czigány; Éva Dónusz; Rita Kőbán; Erika Mészáros	Canoeing	Women's K-4 500 metres	8 August
Silver	Norbert Rózsa	Swimming	Men's 100 metre breaststroke	26 July
Silver	Tünde Szabó	Swimming	Women's 100 metre backstroke	28 July
Silver	Attila Mizsér	Modern pentathlon	Men's individual	29 July
Silver	Norbert Rózsa	Swimming	Men's 200 metre breaststroke	29 July
Silver	Bertalan Hajtós	Judo	Men's 71 kg	31 July
Silver	Henrietta Ónodi	Gymnastics	Women's floor	1 August
Silver	József Csák	Judo	Men's 65 kg	1 August
Silver	Ferenc Hegedűs; Ernő Kolczonay; Iván Kovács; Krisztián Kulcsár; Gábor Totola	Fencing	Men's team épée	6 August
Silver	Zsolt Gyulay	Canoeing	Men's K-1 500 metres	7 August
Silver	Rita Kőbán	Canoeing	Women's K-1 500 metres	7 August
Silver	Péter Abay; Imre Bujdosó; Csaba Köves; György Nébald; Bence Szabó	Fencing	Men's team sabre	7 August
Silver	Attila Ábrahám; Ferenc Csipes; László Fidel; Zsolt Gyulay	Canoeing	Men's K-4 1000 metres	8 August
Bronze	Imre Csősz	Judo	Men's +95 kg	27 July
Bronze	Attila Czene	Swimming	Men's 200 metre individual medley	31 July
Bronze	Éva Dónusz; Rita Kőbán	Canoeing	Women's K-2 500 metres	7 August
Bronze	István Kovács	Boxing	Light flyweight	7 August
Bronze	György Mizsei	Boxing	Light middleweight	7 August
Bronze	Zoltán Béres	Boxing	Light heavyweight	7 August
Bronze	György Zala	Canoeing	Men's C-1 1000 metres	8 August

== Competitors ==
The following is the list of number of competitors in the Games.

Sport	Men	Women	Total
Archery	0	3	3
Athletics	13	11	24
Badminton	0	3	3
Boxing	8	–	8
Canoeing	9	4	13
Cycling	3	1	4
Diving	0	3	3
Equestrian	5	0	5
Fencing	15	5	20
Gymnastics	6	8	14
Handball	15	0	15
Judo	7	5	12
Modern pentathlon	3	–	3
Rowing	5	3	8
Sailing	7	1	8
Shooting	12	6	18
Swimming	10	4	14
Table tennis	0	1	1
Tennis	1	0	1
Water polo	13	–	13
Weightlifting	10	–	10
Wrestling	17	–	17
Total	159	58	217

== Archery ==
After missing the 1984 and 1988 archery competition, Hungary returned in 1992. The nation was represented by three women, only one of whom advanced to the elimination rounds. She won her first match before falling in the second round.

Women

Athlete	Event	Ranking round		Round of 32	Round of 16	Quarterfinals	Semifinals	Final / BM	
Athlete	Event	Score	Seed	Opposition Score	Opposition Score	Opposition Score	Opposition Score	Opposition Score	Rank
Timea Kiss	Individual	1207	54	Did not advance					
Judit Kovács	Individual	1304	16 Q	Wang (CHN); W 103–93	Cho (KOR); L 97–113	Did not advance			
Marina Szendey	Individual	1265	35	Did not advance					
Timea Kiss; Judit Kovács; Marina Szendey	Team	3776	13 Q	—N/a	United States; L 222–235	Did not advance			

== Athletics ==
Men
Track and road events

Athlete	Event	Heats		Quarterfinal		Semifinal		Final	
Athlete	Event	Result	Rank	Result	Rank	Result	Rank	Result	Rank
Tamás Molnár	400 metres	46.21	26 Q	46.80	29	Did not advance			
Zoltán Káldy	10,000 metres	28:21.96	9 q	—N/a				28:34.21	12
Gyula Borka	Marathon	—N/a						2:20:46	38
Csaba Szűcs	Marathon	—N/a						DNF	
Sándor Urbanik	20 kilometres walk	—N/a						1:26:08	8

Field events

Athlete	Event	Qualification		Final	
Athlete	Event	Distance	Position	Distance	Position
István Bagyula	Pole vault	5.55	9 q	5.30	9
Csaba Almási	Long jump	7.69	26	Did not advance	
László Szalma	Long jump	7.47	34	Did not advance	
József Ficsor	Discus throw	58.84	19	Did not advance	
Attila Horváth	Discus throw	62.26	4 q	62.82	5
Tibor Gécsek	Hammer throw	76.48	7 Q	77.78	4

Combined events – Decathlon

Athlete	Event	100 m	LJ	SP	HJ	400 m	110H	DT	PV	JT	1500 m	Final	Rank
Sándor Munkácsy	Result	11.13	7.28	12.56	1.91	48.69	14.81	41.22	4.40	52.90	4:18.62	7698	20
Sándor Munkácsy	Points	832	881	640	723	876	873	689	731	632	821	7698	20
Dezső Szabó	Result	11.09	7.42	13.73	1.97	48.24	14.86	39.22	5.30	59.14	4:19.96	8199	4
Dezső Szabó	Points	841	915	712	776	898	867	649	1004	725	812	8199	4

Women
Track and road events

Athlete	Event	Heats		Quarterfinal		Semifinal		Final	
Athlete	Event	Result	Rank	Result	Rank	Result	Rank	Result	Rank
Ágnes Kozáry	200 metres	24.50	38	Did not advance					
Judit Forgács	400 metres	54.87	32 q	54.24	30	Did not advance			
Karolina Szabó	Marathon	—N/a						2:40:10	11
Edit Molnár; Ágnes Kozáry; Éva Baráti; Judit Forgács	4 × 400 metres relay	3:33.81	11	—N/a				Did not advance	
Andrea Alföldi	10 kilometres walk	—N/a						46:35	18
Ildikó Ilyés	10 kilometres walk	—N/a						45:54	13
Mária Rozsa-Urbanik	10 kilometres walk	—N/a						45:50	12

Field events

Athlete	Event	Qualification		Final	
Athlete	Event	Distance	Position	Distance	Position
Judit Kovács	High jump	1.90	17	Did not advance	
Rita Ináncsi	Long jump	NM		Did not advance	
Kinga Zsigmond	Javelin throw	60.74	7 q	56.54	10

Combined event – Heptathlon

Athlete	Event	100H	HJ	SP	200 m	LJ	JT	800 m	Total	Rank
Rita Ináncsi	Result	14.53	1.67	13.15	25.43	DNF				
Rita Ináncsi	Points	905	818	737	848	DNF				

== Badminton ==
Women

Athlete	Event	Round of 64	Round of 32	Round of 16	Quarterfinals	Semifinals	Final	
Athlete	Event	Opposition Result	Opposition Result	Opposition Result	Opposition Result	Opposition Result	Opposition Result	Rank
Andrea Dakó	Singles	van den Heuvel (NED); L (7–11, 3–11)	Did not advance					
Csilla Fórián	Singles	van der Knaap (NED); L (3–11, 2–11)	Did not advance					
Andrea Harsági	Singles	Krasowska (POL); L (11–5, 0–11, 6–11)	Did not advance					
Andrea Dakó; Csilla Fórián	Doubles	—N/a	Schmidt / Ubben (GER); L (4–15, 6–15)	Did not advance				

== Boxing ==
Athlete	Event	Round of 32	Round of 16	Quarterfinals	Semifinals	Final	
Athlete	Event	Opposition Result	Opposition Result	Opposition Result	Opposition Result	Opposition Result	Rank
Pál Lakatos	Light flyweight	Ganchenko (EUN); W RSC R2	Cho (KOR); W 20–15	Petrov (BUL); L 8–17	Did not advance		
István Kovács	Flyweight	Yadav (IND); W 21–5	Jensen (DEN); W 14–0	Ávila (DOM); W 17–3	Choe (PRK); L 5–10	Did not advance	3rd place, bronze medalist(s)
László Bognár	Bantamweight	Ri (PRK); L RSC R3	Did not advance				
János Petrovics	Lightweight	Odion (NGR); L 8–18	Did not advance				
László Szűcs	Light welterweight	Shailer (NZL); W 7–0	Fulanse (ZAM); W 15–7	Kjäll (FIN); L 1–9	Did not advance		
György Mizsei	Light middleweight	De Chiara (ITA); W 13–4	Simangunsong (INA); W 17–5	Masoe (ASA); W 17–3	Lemus (CUB); L 2–10	Did not advance	3rd place, bronze medalist(s)
Zoltán Béres	Light heavyweight	Mwaselle (TAN); W 30–13	Muhammad (PAK); W RSC R1	Raforme (SEY); W 11–3	Zaulychnyi (EUN); L RSC R3	Did not advance	3rd place, bronze medalist(s)
István Szikora	Super heavyweight	Bye	Rusinov (BUL); L 4–12	Did not advance			

== Canoeing ==
=== Sprint ===
Men

Athlete	Event	Heats		Repechage		Semifinals		Final	
Athlete	Event	Time	Rank	Time	Rank	Time	Rank	Time	Rank
Imre Pulai	C-1 500 metres	1:54.68	2 SF	Bye		1:54.64	2 F	1:54.86	5
György Zala	C-1 1000 metres	4:06.43	1 SF	Bye		4:05.29	4 F	4:07.35	3rd place, bronze medalist(s)
Attila Pálizs; György Kolonics	C-2 500 metres	1:41.71	2 F	—N/a		Bye		1:43.27	7
Attila Pálizs; György Kolonics	C-2 1000 metres	3:37.55	3 SF	—N/a		3:43.96	1 F	3:42.86	5
Zsolt Gyulay	K-1 500 metres	1:41.78	3 R	1:41.44	1 SF	1:42.70	5 F	1:40.64	2nd place, silver medalist(s)
Ferenc Csipes	K-1 1000 metres	3:40.49	2 SF	Bye		3:49.73	9	Did not advance	
Ferenc Csipes; Zsolt Gyulay	K-2 500 metres	1:41.85	6 R	1:31.27	2 SF	1:29.85	5 F	1:32.34	7
Krisztián Bártfai; András Rajna	K-2 1000 metres	3:18.52	3 R	3:18.80	1 SF	3:19.28	4 F	3:20.71	6
Ferenc Csipes; Zsolt Gyulay; László Fidel; Attila Ábrahám	K-4 1000 metres	2:54.08	1	—N/a		2:55.39	2 F	2:54.82	2nd place, silver medalist(s)

Women

Athlete	Event	Heats		Semifinals		Final	
Athlete	Event	Time	Rank	Time	Rank	Time	Rank
Rita Kőbán	K-1 500 metres	1:53.36	2	1:50.97	1 F	1:51.96	2nd place, silver medalist(s)
Rita Kőbán; Éva Dónusz	K-2 500 metres	1:42.54	2	1:40.63	1 F	1:40.81	3rd place, bronze medalist(s)
Éva Dónusz; Kinga Czigány; Erika Mészáros; Rita Kőbán	K-4 500 metres	1:32.94	1 F	Bye		1:38.32	1st place, gold medalist(s)

== Cycling ==
Four cyclists, three men and one woman, represented Hungary in 1992.

=== Road ===
Men

Athlete	Event	Time	Rank
Károly Eisenkrammer	Road race	4:52:07	80
Csaba Steig	Road race	4:35:56	58

Women

Athlete	Event	Time	Rank
Éva Izsák	Road race	2:29:22	51

=== Track ===
Points race

Athlete	Event	Qualification			Final		
Athlete	Event	Laps	Points	Rank	Laps	Points	Rank
Miklós Somogyi	Points race	−1 lap	13	9 Q	DNF		

== Diving ==
Women

Athlete	Event	Qualification		Final	
Athlete	Event	Points	Rank	Points	Rank
Ágnes Gerlach	3 m springboard	265.86	18	Did not advance	
Brigitta Cserba	10 m platform	236.10	27	Did not advance	
Ibolya Nagy	10 m platform	269.52	21	Did not advance	

== Equestrianism ==
=== Eventing ===
Athlete	Horse	Event	Dressage		Cross-country			Jumping			Total	
Athlete	Horse	Event	Penalties	Rank	Penalties	Total	Rank	Penalties	Total	Rank	Penalties	Rank
Zsolt Bubán	Hofeherke	Individual	74.60	66	153.60	228.20	64	DNF				
Tibor Herczegfalvy	Lump	Individual	85.20	76	113.40	198.60	56	10.00	208.60	24	208.60	54
Attila Ling	Hamupipoke	Individual	71.80	61	DNF							
Attila Soós Jr.	Zsizsik	Individual	87.80	77	64.80	152.60	32	0.00	152.60	1	152.60	31
Zsolt Bubán; Tibor Herczegfalvy; Attila Ling; Attila Soós Jr.	See above	Team	231.80	18	DNF							

=== Jumping ===
Athlete	Horse	Event	Qualification								Final					
Athlete	Horse	Event	Round 1		Round 2		Round 3		Total		Round 1		Round 2		Total	
Athlete	Horse	Event	Score	Rank	Score	Rank	Score	Rank	Score	Rank	Penalties	Rank	Penalties	Rank	Penalties	Rank
Vilmos Göttler	Kemal 36	Individual	42.00	43	14.00	74	44.00	44	100.00	58	Did not advance					

== Fencing ==
20 fencers, 15 men and 5 women represented Hungary in 1992.

Individual
Pool stage

Athlete	Event	Group Stage						
Athlete	Event	Opposition Result	Opposition Result	Opposition Result	Opposition Result	Opposition Result	Opposition Result	Rank
István Busa	Men's foil	Cerioni (ITA); L 3–5	Omnès (FRA); L 2–5	Ichigatani (JPN); L 4–5	García (ESP); W 5–1	van Garderen (RSA); W 5–4	Youssef (LBN); W 5–1	27 Q
Zsolt Érsek	Men's foil	Davis (GBR); W 5–3	Richter (AUT); W 5–1	Bravin (USA); W 5–2	da Ponte (PAR); W 5–1	Wong (SGP); W 5–3	Wagner (GER); L 4–5	5 Q
Róbert Kiss	Men's foil	Shevchenko (EUN); L 0–5	Sypniewski (POL); L 4–5	Wang (CHN); W 5–4	Kim (KOR); W 5–1	Guimarães (POR); W 5–2	Longenbach (USA); L 3–5	29 Q
Ferenc Hegedűs	Men's épée	Cuomo (ITA); L 4–5	Nowosielski (CAN); L 2–5	Pantelimon (ROU); L 2–5	de la Peña (ESP); W 5–3	Tanabe (JPN); W 5–2	Torrente (RSA); W 5–2	39 Q
Iván Kovács	Men's épée	Kaaberma (EST); W 5–1	Davidson (AUS); W 5–4	Normile (USA); W 5–1	Gadomski (POL); W 5–1	Tan (SGP); W 5–1	Chang (KOR); L 3–5	6 Q
Krisztián Kulcsár	Men's épée	Felisiak (GER); W 5–4	O'Brien (IRL); W 5–4	Marx (USA); W 5–2	Pereira (ESP); W 5–4	Bandeira (POR); W 5–3	Álvarez (PAR); W 5–2	4 Q
Csaba Köves	Men's sabre	García (ESP); L 4–5	Shirshov (EUN); W 5–4	Fletcher (GBR); W 5–1	Silva (POR); W 5–1	Cottingham (USA); L 2–5	—N/a	17 Q
György Nébald	Men's sabre	Marin (ITA); W 5–2	Kiriyenko (EUN); W 5–0	Peinador (ESP); W 5–4	Zheng (CHN); W 5–4	Torrente (RSA); W 5–1	Hashimoto (JPN); W 5–0	1 Q
Bence Szabó	Men's sabre	Daurelle (FRA); W 5–2	Chiculiță (ROU); W 5–4	Jia (CHN); W 5–1	Zavieh (GBR); L 4–5	—N/a		10 Q
Zsuzsa Jánosi-Németh	Women's foil	Tufan (ROU); W 5–4	Sobczak (POL); W 5–4	Modaine (FRA); W 5–3	Bracewell (GBR); W 5–2	Iannuzzi (ARG); W 5–3	Bilodeaux-Banos (USA); L 4–5	4 Q
Ildikó Mincza	Women's foil	Xiao (CHN); W 5–3	Dobmeier (GER); W 5–4	McIntosh (GBR); W 5–0	Aubin (CAN); W 5–3	Czuckermann-Hatuel (ISR); L 3–5	—N/a	7 Q
Gertrúd Stefanek	Women's foil	Szabo (ROU); W 5–2	E (CHN); W 5–3	Trillini (ITA); W 5–3	Castillejo (ESP); W 5–2	Giancola (ARG); W 5–0	Reyes (HON); W 5–3	1 Q

Elimination phase

Athlete	Event	Round 1	Round 2	Round 3	Round 4	Repechage				Quarterfinals	Semifinals	Final	
Athlete	Event	Round 1	Round 2	Round 3	Round 4	Round 1	Round 2	Round 3	Round 4	Quarterfinals	Semifinals	Final	
Athlete	Event	Opposition Result	Opposition Result	Opposition Result	Opposition Result	Opposition Result	Opposition Result	Opposition Result	Opposition Result	Opposition Result	Opposition Result	Opposition Result	Rank
István Busa	Men's foil	Guerra (ESP); W 2–1	Borella (ITA); L 0–2	Did not advance		García (CUB); L 0–2	Did not advance						
Zsolt Érsek	Men's foil	Bye	Bravo (ESP); W 2–1	Wendt (AUT); L 1–2	Did not advance	Bye	Nagano (JPN); W 2–1	Wagner (GER); L 0—2	Did not advance				
Róbert Kiss	Men's foil	Kajbjer (SWE); L 0–2	Did not advance										
Ferenc Hegedűs	Men's épée	Lundblad (SWE); L 0–2	Did not advance										
Iván Kovács	Men's épée	Bye	Kravchuk (EUN); W 2–0	Marx (USA); W 2–0	Rivas (COL); W 2–0	Bye				Srecki (FRA); L 1–2	Did not advance		
Krisztián Kulcsár	Men's épée	Bye	de la Peña (ESP); L 1–2	Did not advance		Lee (KOR); W 2–0	Marx (USA); W 2–1	Henry (FRA); L 1–2	Did not advance				
Csaba Köves	Men's sabre	Bye	Babanasis (GRE); W 2–1	Shirshov (EUN); W 2–0	García (ESP); L 1–2	Bye			Marin (ITA); L 0–2	Did not advance			
György Nébald	Men's sabre	Bye	Banos (CAN); L 0–2	Did not advance		Kościelniakowski (POL); L 0–2	Did not advance						
Bence Szabó	Men's sabre	Bye	Zheng (CHN); W 2–0	Becker (GER); W 2–1	Scalzo (ITA); L 0–2	Bye			Olech (POL); W 2–0	Meglio (ITA); W 2–0	Scalzo (ITA); W 2–1	Marin (ITA); W 2–0	1st place, gold medalist(s)
Zsuzsa Jánosi-Németh	Women's foil	Bye	Aubin (CAN); W 2–0	Zalaffi (ITA); L 1–2	Did not advance	Bye	Meygret (FRA); W 2–0	Tremblay (CAN); W 2–0	Modaine (FRA); L 0–2	Did not advance			
Ildikó Mincza	Women's foil	Bye	Trillini (ITA); L 1–2	Did not advance		Sadovskaya (EUN); L 1–2	Did not advance						
Gertrúd Stefanek	Women's foil	Bye	McIntosh (GBR); L 0–2	Did not advance		Maciejewska (POL); W 2–0	Xiao (CHN); L 0–2	Did not advance					

Team

Athlete	Event	Group Stage			Quarterfinals	Semifinals	Final	
Athlete	Event	Opposition Result	Opposition Result	Rank	Opposition Result	Opposition Result	Opposition Result	Rank
István Busa; Zsolt Érsek; Róbert Gátai; Róbert Kiss; Zsolt Németh	Men's foil	Cuba; L 3–9	Great Britain; W 9–7	2 Q	Italy; W 9–5	Germany; L 5–8	Poland; L 4–9	4
Ferenc Hegedűs; Ernő Kolczonay; Iván Kovács; Krisztián Kulcsár; Gábor Totola	Men's épée	Germany; W 9–5	Romania; W 9–5	1 Q	Canada; W 8*–8	France; W 9–3	Germany; L 4–8	2nd place, silver medalist(s)
Péter Abay; Imre Bujdosó; Csaba Köves; György Nébald; Bence Szabó	Men's sabre	Unified Team; L 6–9	Canada; W 9–5	2 Q	Germany; W 9–3	France; W 9–1	Unified Team; L 5–9	2nd place, silver medalist(s)
Zsuzsa Jánosi-Németh; Gabriella Lantos; Ildikó Mincza; Ildikó Pusztai; Gertrúd Stefanek	Women's foil	Unified Team; L 4–9	Great Britain; W 9–1	2 Q	Italy; L 2–9	China; L 8–8*	Poland; W 9–7	7

== Gymnastics ==
=== Artistic ===
==== Men ====
Team

Athlete	Event	Qualification							
Athlete	Event	Apparatus						Total	Rank
Athlete	Event	F	PH	R	V	PB	HB	Total	Rank
Szilveszter Csollány	Team	18.575	19.275	19.675 Q	19.200 q	18.850	18.925	114.500	30 Q
Róbert Élő	Team	18.875	18.900	18.950	18.825	17.400	18.900	111.850	71
Csaba Fajkusz	Team	19.025	19.000	19.050	18.750	18.775	19.325	113.925	38 q
Miklós Pánczél	Team	9.400	18.925	18.725	18.425	18.925	19.200	103.600	89
Károly Schupkégel	Team	18.700	18.700	19.000	18.925	18.225	18.100	111.650	73
Zoltán Supola	Team	19.250	18.975	19.450	19.250 Q	19.175	19.175	115.275	13 Q
Total	Team	94.625	95.075	96.125	95.100	94.075	95.525	570.525	9

Individual finals

Athlete	Event	Apparatus						Total	Rank
Athlete	Event	F	PH	R	V	PB	HB	Total	Rank
Szilveszter Csollány	All-around	9.625	9.575	9.550	9.675	9.675	9.550	57.650	9
Szilveszter Csollány	Rings	—N/a		9.800	—N/a			9.800	6
Szilveszter Csollány	Vault	—N/a			9.524	—N/a		9.524	7
Csaba Fajkusz	All-around	9.625	9.725	8.900	9.550	9.400	9.350	56.550	28
Zoltán Supola	All-around	9.600	9.650	9.600	9.575	9.475	9.650	57.550	12
Zoltán Supola	Vault	—N/a			9.674	—N/a		9.674	5

==== Women ====
Team

Athlete	Event	Qualification					
Athlete	Event	Apparatus				Total	Rank
Athlete	Event	V	UB	BB	F	Total	Rank
Bernadett Balázs	Team	19.474	19.312	18.637	19.475	76.898	54
Ildikó Balog	Team	19.412	18.825	18.112	19.275	75.624	81
Kinga Horváth	Team	19.525	19.375	18.924	19.012	76.836	55
Andrea Molnár	Team	19.687	19.700	19.449	19.550	78.386	23 Q
Krisztina Molnár	Team	9.887	19.499	18.999	19.474	67.859	89
Henrietta Ónodi	Team	19.862 Q	19.775	19.199	19.862 Q	78.698	16 Q
Total	Team	98.097	97.661	95.208	97.636	388.602	6

Individual finals

Athlete	Event	Apparatus				Total	Rank
Athlete	Event	V	UB	BB	F	Total	Rank
Andrea Molnár	All-around	9.687	9.800	9.800	9.950	39.237	15
Henrietta Ónodi	All-around	9.712	9.912	9.875	9.950	39.449	8
Henrietta Ónodi	Vault	9.925	—N/a			9.925	1st place, gold medalist(s)
Henrietta Ónodi	Floor	—N/a			9.950	9.950	2nd place, silver medalist(s)

=== Rhythmic ===
Athlete	Event	Qualification						Final						
Athlete	Event	Hoop	Rope	Clubs	Ball	Total	Rank	Qualification	Hoop	Rope	Clubs	Ball	Total	Rank
Viktória Fráter	Individual	9.150	9.000	8.800	9.150	36.100	24	Did not advance						
Andrea Szalay	Individual	9.100	8.950	8.650	9.125	35.825	28	Did not advance						

== Handball ==
Summary

Key:

- ET: After extra time
- P – Match decided by penalty-shootout.

Team	Event	Group stage						Semifinal	Final / BM	
Team	Event	Opposition Score	Opposition Score	Opposition Score	Opposition Score	Opposition Score	Rank	Opposition Score	Opposition Score	Rank
Hungary men's	Men's tournament	South Korea; L 18–22	Brazil; W 27–21	Iceland; L 16–22	Sweden; L 21–25	Czechoslovakia; W 20–18	4	—N/a	Romania; W 23–19	7

=== Men's tournament ===
- Attila Borsos
- Attila Horváth
- Ferenc Füzesi
- Igor Zubjuk
- Imre Bíró
- István Csoknyai
- Jakab Sibalin
- János Szathmári
- József Éles
- László Marosi
- László Sótonyi
- Mihály Iváncsik
- Ottó Csicsay
- Richárd Mezei
- Sándor Győrffy
- Head coach: Attila Joosz

Group play

Pos	Team	Pld	W	D	L	GF	GA	GD	Pts	Qualification
1	Sweden	5	5	0	0	120	86	+34	10	Semifinals
2	Iceland	5	3	1	1	101	99	+2	7	Semifinals
3	South Korea	5	3	0	2	114	117	−3	6	Fifth place game
4	Hungary	5	2	0	3	102	108	−6	4	Seventh place game
5	Czechoslovakia	5	1	1	3	94	92	+2	3	Ninth place game
6	Brazil	5	0	0	5	96	125	−29	0	Eleventh place game

27 July 1992; 19:00	Hungary	18–22	South Korea	Palau d'Esports de Granollers, Granollers; Referees: Øie, Høgsnes (NOR)
27 July 1992; 19:00	Iváncsik 7	(11–11)	Cho C. 9	Palau d'Esports de Granollers, Granollers; Referees: Øie, Høgsnes (NOR)

29 July 1992; 14:30	Brazil	21–27	Hungary	Palau d'Esports de Granollers, Granollers; Referees: Convents, Xhonneux (BEL)
29 July 1992; 14:30	Nascimento 5	(10–10)	Iváncsik 5	Palau d'Esports de Granollers, Granollers; Referees: Convents, Xhonneux (BEL)

31 July 1992; 14:30	Iceland	22–16	Hungary	Palau d'Esports de Granollers, Granollers; Referees: Lelong, Tancrez (FRA)
31 July 1992; 14:30	Grímsson 6		Marosi 4	Palau d'Esports de Granollers, Granollers; Referees: Lelong, Tancrez (FRA)

2 August 1992; 16:00	Hungary	21–25	Sweden	Palau d'Esports de Granollers, Granollers; Referees: Gallego, Lamas (ESP)
2 August 1992; 16:00	Éles 5	(10–14)	Hajas 6	Palau d'Esports de Granollers, Granollers; Referees: Gallego, Lamas (ESP)

4 August 1992; 11:30	Hungary	20–18	Czechoslovakia	Palau d'Esports de Granollers, Granollers; Referees: Thomas, Thomas (GER)
4 August 1992; 11:30	Horváth 7	(9–8)	Šetlík 6	Palau d'Esports de Granollers, Granollers; Referees: Thomas, Thomas (GER)

7th place game

7 August 1992; 19:00	Romania	19–23	Hungary	Palau d'Esports de Granollers, Granollers; Referees: Rudin, Schill (SUI)
7 August 1992; 19:00	Prisăcaru 4	(13–9)	Horváth 7	Palau d'Esports de Granollers, Granollers; Referees: Rudin, Schill (SUI)

== Judo ==
Men

Athlete	Event	Round of 64	Round of 32	Round of 16	Quarterfinals	Semifinals	Repechage			Final	
Athlete	Event	Round of 64	Round of 32	Round of 16	Quarterfinals	Semifinals	Round 1	Round 2	Round 3	Final	
Athlete	Event	Opposition Result	Opposition Result	Opposition Result	Opposition Result	Opposition Result	Opposition Result	Opposition Result	Opposition Result	Opposition Result	Rank
József Wágner	60 kg	Bye	Koshino (JPN); L Ippon	Did not advance			Chen (CHN); W Ippon	Hiptmair (AUT); W Ippon	Battulga (MGL); W Ippon	Trautmann (GER); L Koka	5
József Csák	65 kg	Mavatiku (ZAI); W Ippon	Netov (BUL); W Yuko	Petřikov (TCH); W Yuko	Laats (BEL); W Ippon	Hernández (CUB); W Ippon	—N/a			Sampaio (BRA); L Waza-ari	2nd place, silver medalist(s)
Bertalan Hajtós	71 kg	Bye	Hatashita (CAN); W Ippon	Boldbaatar (MGL); W Ippon	Dahmani (ALG); W Ippon	Chung (KOR); W Ippon	—N/a			Koga (JPN); L Yusei-gachi	2nd place, silver medalist(s)
Zsolt Zsoldos	78 kg	Kutama (ZAI); W Sogo-gachi	Rekik (TUN); W Yusei-gachi	Laats (BEL); L Ippon	Did not advance		Birch (GBR); W Ippon	Damaisin (FRA); L Ippon	Did not advance		
Károly Korbel	86 kg	—N/a	Tayot (FRA); L Koka	Did not advance			Croitoru (ROU); L Yusei-gachi	Did not advance			
Antal Kovács	95 kg	Bye	Torres (ANG); W Ippon	Sergeyev (EUN); W Yuko	Miguel (BRA); W Waza-ari	Meijer (NED); W Yuko	—N/a			Stevens (GBR); W Yuko	1st place, gold medalist(s)
Imre Csősz	+95 kg	—N/a	Keeve (USA); W Keikoku	Venturelli (ITA); W Ippon	Stoykov (BUL); W Sogo-gachi	Khakhaleishvili (EUN); L Waza-ari	—N/a			Van Barneveld (BEL); W Waza-ari	3rd place, bronze medalist(s)

Women

Athlete	Event	Round of 32	Round of 16	Quarterfinals	Semifinals	Repechage			Final	
Athlete	Event	Round of 32	Round of 16	Quarterfinals	Semifinals	Round 1	Round 2	Round 3	Final	
Athlete	Event	Opposition Result	Opposition Result	Opposition Result	Opposition Result	Opposition Result	Opposition Result	Opposition Result	Opposition Result	Rank
Katalin Parragh	52 kg	Berna (FRA); L Koka	Did not advance							
Mária Pekli	56 kg	Jin (CHN); L Waza-ari	Did not advance							
Zsuzsa Nagy	61 kg	Badamsüren (MGL); W Ippon	Griffith (VEN); L Ippon	Did not advance						
Anita Király	66 kg	Bye	Kotelnikova (EUN); W Koka	Revé (CUB); L Ippon	Did not advance	—N/a	Jividen (USA); L Waza-ari	Did not advance		
Éva Gránitz	+72 kg	Bye	Motta (ITA); W Yusei-gachi	Zhuang (CHN); L Ippon	Did not advance	—N/a	Lee (GBR); W Ippon	Weber (GER); L Ippon	Did not advance	

== Modern pentathlon ==
Three male pentathletes represented Hungary in 1992.

Athlete	Event	Fencing (épée one touch)			Swimming (300 m freestyle)			Shooting (Air pistol)			Riding (show jumping)			Running (4000 m)			Total points	Final rank
Athlete	Event	Results	Rank	MP points	Time	Rank	MP points	Points	Rank	MP Points	Penalties	Rank	MP points	Time	Rank	MP Points	Total points	Final rank
László Fábián	Individual	48	1	1034	3:18.8	11	1284	170	62	820	300	50	800	13:33.3	29	1126	5064	32
Attila Kálnoki Kis	Individual	38	9	864	3:28.8	41	1204	185	31	1045	302	52	798	13:25.5	20	1150	5061	33
Attila Mizsér	Individual	40	7	898	3:28.4	40	1208	191	7	1135	108	27	992	13:04.6	9	1213	5446	2nd place, silver medalist(s)
László Fábián; Attila Kálnoki Kis; Attila Mizsér	Team	126	1	2796	10:16.0	9	3696	546	11	3000	710	13	2590	40:03.4	5	3489	15571	5

== Rowing ==
Men

Athlete	Event	Heats		Repechage		Semifinals		Final	
Athlete	Event	Time	Rank	Time	Rank	Time	Rank	Time	Rank
Gábor Mitring	Single sculls	7:11.93	3 R	7:22.13	4 SC/D	7:05.04	2 FC	7:12.65	15
Zsolt Dani; Zsolt Lévai	Double sculls	6:42.80	3 R	6:42.31	1 SA/B	6:31.46	6 FB	6:27.23	10
Henrik Schneider; Imre Magyar	Coxless pair	6:53.82	5 R	6:53.44	3 FC	—N/a		6:51.20	16

Women

Athlete	Event	Heats		Repechage		Semifinals		Final	
Athlete	Event	Time	Rank	Time	Rank	Time	Rank	Time	Rank
Katalin Sarlós	Single sculls	8:00.45	5 R	8:05.17	4 FC	—N/a		8:11.55	13
Edit Punk; Anikó Kapócs	Double sculls	7:47.05	4 R	7:43.84	4	—N/a			13

== Sailing ==
Men

Athlete	Event	Race							Net points	Final rank
Athlete	Event	1	2	3	4	5	6	7	Net points	Final rank
Attila Szilvássy	Finn	26	21	15	24	26	24	~~27~~	136	21
Gyula Nyári; Zsolt Nyári	470	22	30	15	34	21	0	~~35~~	122	15

Women

Athlete	Event	Race							Net points	Final rank
Athlete	Event	1	2	3	4	5	6	7	Net points	Final rank
Krisztina Bácsics	Europe	19	27	15	28	16	22	~~27~~	126	19

Women

Athlete	Event	Race							Net points	Final rank
Athlete	Event	1	2	3	4	5	6	7	Net points	Final rank
Tamás Pomucz; Tamás Somogyi	Flying Dutchman	19	27	25	25	27	~~27~~	23	146	23
Ferenc Nagy; Tibor Tenke	Star	19	28	18	23	24	22	~~33~~	134	22

== Shooting ==
Men

Athlete	Event	Qualification		Final	
Athlete	Event	Points	Rank	Points	Rank
István Ágh	10 metre air pistol	577	14	Did not advance	
István Ágh	50 metre pistol	561	7 Q	652	6
Olivér Gáspár	10 metre air rifle	583	31	Did not advance	
Sándor Kacskó	25 metre rapid fire pistol	571	28	Did not advance	
Lajos Pálinkás	25 metre rapid fire pistol	579	22	Did not advance	
Zoltán Papanitz	50 metre pistol	548	31	Did not advance	
László Pető	10 metre air pistol	562	43	Did not advance	
József Sike	10 metre running target	576	5 Q	667	5
Attila Solti	10 metre running target	569	13	Did not advance	
Zsolt Vári	50 metre rifle three positions	1164	8 Q	1258.6	8
Zsolt Vári	50 mete rifle prone	595	15	Did not advance	
Attila Záhonyi	10 metre air rifle	586	21	Did not advance	
Attila Záhonyi	50 metre rifle three positions	1157	20	Did not advance	
Attila Záhonyi	50 metre rifle prone	592	26	Did not advance	

Women

Athlete	Event	Qualification		Final	
Athlete	Event	Points	Rank	Points	Rank
Ágnes Ferencz	10 metre air pistol	377	15	Did not advance	
Ágnes Ferencz	25 metre pistol	571	26	Did not advance	
Éva Fórián	10 metre air rifle	392	7 Q	492.4	7
Éva Fórián	50 metre rifle three positions	582	4 Q	679.5	4
Anna Gönczi	10 metre air pistol	375	24	Did not advance	
Anna Gönczi	25 metre pistol	576	12	Did not advance	
Éva Joó	10 metre air rifle	390	15	Did not advance	
Éva Joó	50 metre rifle three positions	580	8 Q	673.6	8

Open

Athlete	Event	Qualification		Final	
Athlete	Event	Points	Rank	Points	Rank
Diána Igaly	Skeet	143	42	Did not advance	
Erzsébet Vasvári-Pongrátz	Skeet	137	58	Did not advance	
Zoltán Bodó	Trap	141	25	Did not advance	
István Putz	Trap	137	39	Did not advance	

== Swimming ==
Men

Athlete	Event	Heats		Final A/B	
Athlete	Event	Time	Rank	Time	Rank
Olivér Ágh	100 metre backstroke	59.02	41	Did not advance	
Olivér Ágh	200 metre backstroke	2:04.52	27	Did not advance	
Attila Czene	200 metre individual medley	2:02.05	5 FA	2:01.00	3rd place, bronze medalist(s)
Attila Czene	400 metre individual medley	4:26.31	16 FB	4:21.28	9
Tamás Darnyi	200 metre individual medley	2:01.29	2 FA	2:00.76	1st place, gold medalist(s)
Tamás Darnyi	400 metre individual medley	4:18.34	2 FA	4:14.23	1st place, gold medalist(s)
Tamás Deutsch	100 metre backstroke	56.47	13 FB	56.70	13
Tamás Deutsch	200 metre backstroke	2:00.50	8 FA	2:00.06	7
Károly Güttler	100 metre breaststroke	1:02.28	9 FB	1:01.84	9
Károly Güttler	200 metre breaststroke	2:14.31	4 FA	2:13.32	5
Péter Horváth	100 metre butterfly	56.09	35	Did not advance	
Norbert Rózsa	100 metre breaststroke	1:02.25	8 FA	1:01.68	2nd place, silver medalist(s)
Norbert Rózsa	200 metre breaststroke	2:12.95	2 FA	2:11.23	2nd place, silver medalist(s)
Béla Szabados	100 metre freestyle	50.78	20	Did not advance	
Béla Szabados	200 metre freestyle	1:52.50	27	Did not advance	
Zoltán Szilágyi	200 metre freestyle	DQ		Did not advance	
Zoltán Szilágyi	400 metre freestyle	3:56.68	20	Did not advance	
Zoltán Szilágyi	1500 metre freestyle	15:52.80	21	Did not advance	
Tamás Deutsch; Norbert Rózsa; Péter Horváth; Béla Szabados	4 × 100 metre medley relay	3:43.61	6 FA	3:42.03	6

Women

Athlete	Event	Heats		Final A/B	
Athlete	Event	Time	Rank	Time	Rank
Gabriella Csépe	100 metre breaststroke	1:10.58	8 FA	1:10.19	6
Gabriella Csépe	200 metre breaststroke	2:32.04	10 FB	2:31.15	9
Krisztina Egerszegi	100 metre backstroke	1:00.85	1 FA	1:00.68	1st place, gold medalist(s)
Krisztina Egerszegi	200 metre backstroke	2:07.34	1 FA	2:07.06	1st place, gold medalist(s)
Krisztina Egerszegi	400 metre individual medley	4:43.83	1 FA	4:36.54	1st place, gold medalist(s)
Judit Kiss	400 metre freestyle	4:24.01	24	Did not advance	
Judit Kiss	800 metre freestyle	8:58.16	18	Did not advance	
Tünde Szabó	100 metre backstroke	1:02.14	3 FA	1:01.14	2nd place, silver medalist(s)
Tünde Szabó	200 metre backstroke	2:13.81	8 FA	2:12.94	6

== Table tennis ==
Women

Athlete	Event	Group Stage				Round of 16	Quarterfinal	Semifinal	Final	
Athlete	Event	Opposition Result	Opposition Result	Opposition Result	Rank	Opposition Result	Opposition Result	Opposition Result	Opposition Result	Rank
Csilla Bátorfi	Singles	Cabrera (COL); W 2–0	Lomas (GBR); W 2–0	Pratiwi (INA); W 2–0	1 Q	Deng (CHN); L 0–3	Did not advance			

== Tennis ==
Men

Athlete	Event	Round of 64	Round of 32	Round of 16	Quarterfinals	Semifinals	Final	
Athlete	Event	Opposition Result	Opposition Result	Opposition Result	Opposition Result	Opposition Result	Opposition Result	Rank
Sándor Noszály	Singles	Koevermans (NED); L (2–6, 3–6, 6–2, 2–6)	Did not advance					

== Water polo ==
Summary

Key:

- FT – After full time.

Team	Event	Group stage						Classification round		
Team	Event	Opposition Score	Opposition Score	Opposition Score	Opposition Score	Opposition Score	Rank	Opposition Score	Opposition Score	Rank
Hungary men's	Men's tournament	Italy; D 7–7	Cuba; W 12–11	Spain; L 5–8	Greece; W 12–7	Netherlands; D 13–13	3	Germany; W 8–7	Australia; L 8–9	6

Team roster

- Tibor Benedek
- István Dóczi
- András Gyöngyösi
- Péter Kuna
- Gábor Nemes
- Imre Péter
- Zsolt Petőváry
- Gábor Schmiedt
- Frank Tóth
- Imre Tóth
- László Tóth
- Zsolt Varga
- Balázs Vincze

Group play

Pos	Team	Pld	W	D	L	GF	GA	GD	Pts
1	Spain	5	4	1	0	52	36	+16	9
2	Italy	5	3	2	0	41	34	+7	8
3	Hungary	5	2	2	1	49	46	+3	6
4	Cuba	5	2	0	3	50	53	−3	4
5	Netherlands	5	0	2	3	36	46	−10	2
6	Greece	5	0	1	4	32	45	−13	1

1 August 1992	Hungary	7–7	Italy	Piscina Municipal de Montjuïc

2 August 1992	Cuba	11–12	Hungary	Piscina Municipal de Montjuïc

3 August 1992	Hungary	5–8	Spain	Piscina Municipal de Montjuïc

5 August 1992	Greece	7–12	Hungary	Piscina Municipal de Montjuïc

6 August 1992	Hungary	13–13	Netherlands	Piscina Municipal de Montjuïc

Classification round 5th-8th place

Pos	Team	Pld	W	D	L	GF	GA	GD	Pts
5	Australia	3	2	1	0	23	20	+3	5
6	Hungary	3	2	0	1	28	27	+1	4
7	Germany	3	1	1	1	24	21	+3	3
8	Cuba	3	0	0	3	22	29	−7	0

Source: https://www.olympedia.org/results/38777

8 August 1992	Germany	7–8	Hungary	Piscina Municipal de Montjuïc

9 August 1992	Australia	9–8	Hungary	Piscina Municipal de Montjuïc

== Weightlifting ==
Athlete	Event	Snatch		Clean & jerk		Total	Rank
Athlete	Event	Result	Rank	Result	Rank	Total	Rank
Tibor Karczag	56 kg	115.0	5	140.0	6	255.0	6
Ferenc Lénárt	56 kg	112.5	7	140.0	6	252.5	9
Attila Czanka	60 kg	127.5	7	157.5	7	285.0	7
László Barsi	82.5 kg	160.0	6	185.0	15	345.0	14
István Mészáros	82.5 kg	152.5	16	182.5	17	335.0	18
István Dudás	90 kg	157.5	8	187.5	11	345.0	10
István Halász	90 kg	152.5	11	190.0	9	342.5	11
Andor Szanyi	100 kg	175.0	4	NM		DNF	
László Németh	110 kg	172.5	10	200.0	11	372.5	12
Tibor Stark	110 kg	165.0	14	190.0	17	355.0	15

== Wrestling ==
Greco-Roman

Athlete	Event	Group Stage							Final	
Athlete	Event	Opposition Result	Opposition Result	Opposition Result	Opposition Result	Opposition Result	Opposition Result	Rank	Opposition Result	Rank
József Faragó	48 kg	Jadav (IND); L 3–19	Simkhah (IRI); L 1–12	Did not advance				8	Did not advance	
András Sike	57 kg	Theodoridis (GRE); W 3–2	Hanahara (JPN); W 8–1	Yildiz (GER); L Fall	Lara (CUB); L 0–1	Did not advance		5	Naanaa (MAR); L w/o	10
Jenő Bódi	62 kg	Ibrahim (EGY); W 6–0	Huh (KOR); W 5–2	Martínez (ESP); W 6–4	Pirim (TUR); L 3–7	Marén (CUB); L 1–5	—N/a	3	Lee (USA); W w/o	5
Attila Repka	68 kg	Stoyanov (BUL); W 4–1	Sabo (IOA); W 10–1	Cărare (ROU); W 6–0	Yalouz (FRA); W 6–0	Smith (USA); W 10–0	Bye	1	Dugushiev (EUN); W 1–0	1st place, gold medalist(s)
János Takács	74 kg	Kasap (CAN); L 0–2	Iskandaryan (EUN); L 0–8	Did not advance				9	Did not advance	
Péter Farkas	82 kg	Kasum (IOA); W 4–1	Hussein (EGY); W 2–0	Zander (GER); W 1–0	Henderson (USA); W 2–0	Fredriksson (SWE); W 2–0	—N/a	1	Stępień (POL); W 6–1	1st place, gold medalist(s)
Tibor Komáromi	90 kg	Koskela (FIN); W 2–1	Başar (TUR); L DQ	Koguashvili (EUN); L 2–3	Did not advance			7	Did not advance	
Norbert Növényi	100 kg	Sandoval (PAN); W Fall	Govedarica (IOA); L 1–3	Steinbach (GER); L 1–4	Did not advance			4	Song (KOR); W w/o	7
László Klauz	130 kg	Johansson (SWE); L DQ	Gerovski (BUL); W 1–0	Tian (CHN); W 2–1	Poikilidis (GRE); W 2–1	—N/a		2	Grigoraș (ROU); L 0–1	4

Freestyle

Athlete	Event	Group Stage						Final	
Athlete	Event	Opposition Result	Opposition Result	Opposition Result	Opposition Result	Opposition Result	Rank	Opposition Result	Rank
László Óváry	48 kg	Sammari (TUN); W 7–5	Avramov (BUL); L 2–7	Martínez (CUB); L 5–20	Did not advance		5	Petryshen (CAN); L w/o	10
Béla Nagy	57 kg	Dorgu (NGR); W Fall	Tsogtbayar (MGL); L 9–25	Smal (EUN); L 0–13	Did not advance		6	Did not advance	
Endre Elekes	68 kg	Akaishi (JPN); L Fall	Barcia (ESP); W 7–1	Geller (ISR); L DQ	Did not advance		5	Sartoro (FRA); L w/o	10
János Nagy	74 kg	Holmes (CAN); L 2–4	Leipold (GER); W 2–1	Park (KOR); L 0–5	Did not advance		4	Enkhbayar (MGL); W w/o	7
László Dvorák	82 kg	Okporu (NGR); W 2–0	Ito (JPN); W 8–0	Gstöttner (GER); L 3–6	Zhabrailov (EUN); L 0–1	Did not advance	5	Hohl (CAN); L 1–3	10
Gábor Tóth	90 kg	Şimşek (TUR); L 0–6	Garmulewicz (POL); W 5–4	Baninosrat (IRI); L 0–4	Did not advance		6	Did not advance	
Sándor Kiss	100 kg	Diouf (SEN); W 7–3	Gutiérrez (NCA); W 16–0	Kayalı (TUR); L 0–5	Khabelov (EUN); L 0–6	Did not advance	4	Coleman (USA); L 0–2	8
Zsolt Gombos	130 kg	Schröder (GER); L 0–4	Baumgartner (USA); L 0–8	Did not advance			7	Did not advance	
