= Fencing at the 1992 Summer Olympics – Men's team sabre =

Men's team sabre at the Games of the XXV Olympiad
- Venue: Palace of Metallurgy
- Dates: August 6 – 7, 1992
- Competitors: 59 from 12 nations

Medalists
1st place, gold medalist(s)		Grigory Kiriyenko; Aleksandr Shirshov; Heorhiy Pohosov; Vadym Huttsait; Stanislav Pozdnyakov	Unified Team
2nd place, silver medalist(s)		Bence Szabó; Csaba Köves; György Nébald; Péter Abay; Imre Bujdosó	Hungary
3rd place, bronze medalist(s)		Jean-François Lamour; Jean-Philippe Daurelle; Franck Ducheix; Hervé Granger-Veyron; Pierre Guichot	France

The men's team sabre was one of eight fencing events on the fencing at the 1992 Summer Olympics programme. It was the nineteenth appearance of the event. The competition was held from August 6 to 7, 1992. 59 fencers from 12 nations competed.

Stanislav Pozdnyakov of the Unified Team received a team gold medal, though he lost the only bout he fenced, to Canadian Jean-Paul Banos.

== Rosters ==
Canada

- Jean-Paul Banos
- Jean-Marie Banos
- Tony Plourde
- Evens Gravel
- Leszek Nowosielski

China

- Jia Guihua
- Ning Xiankui
- Yang Zhen
- Jiang Yefei
- Zheng Zhaokang

France

- Jean-François Lamour
- Jean-Philippe Daurelle
- Franck Ducheix
- Hervé Granger-Veyron
- Pierre Guichot

Germany

- Felix Becker
- Jörg Kempenich
- Jürgen Nolte
- Jacek Huchwajda
- Steffen Wiesinger

Great Britain

- Kirk Zavieh
- Ian Williams
- Gary Fletcher
- James Williams
- Amin Zahir

Hungary

- Bence Szabó
- Csaba Köves
- György Nébald
- Péter Abay
- Imre Bujdosó

Italy

- Marco Marin
- Ferdinando Meglio
- Giovanni Scalzo
- Giovanni Sirovich
- Tonhi Terenzi

Poland

- Marek Gniewkowski
- Norbert Jaskot
- Jarosław Kisiel
- Robert Kościelniakowski
- Janusz Olech

Romania

- Alexandru Chiculiţă
- Victor Găureanu
- Daniel Grigore
- Florin Lupeică
- Vilmoș Szabo

Spain

- Antonio García
- Raúl Peinador
- José Luis Álvarez
- Marco Antonio Rioja
- Alberto Falcón

Unified Team

- Grigory Kiriyenko
- Aleksandr Shirshov
- Heorhiy Pohosov
- Vadym Huttsait
- Stanislav Pozdnyakov

United States

- Mike Lofton
- Bob Cottingham
- Steve Mormando
- John Friedberg
- Peter Westbrook

== Results ==
=== Round 1 ===
==== Round 1 Pool A ====
Pos	Team	W	L	BW	BL	Qual.
1	Italy	2	0	18	5	QQ
2	China	1	1	13	16	QQ
3	Spain	0	2	7	17	

Source: Official Report, vol. 2, p. 204

==== Round 1 Pool B ====
Pos	Team	W	L	BW	BL	Qual.
1	France	2	0	18	12	QQ
2	Romania	1	1	16	14	QQ
3	United States	0	2	10	18	

Source: Official Report, vol. 2, p. 204

==== Round 1 Pool C ====
Pos	Team	W	L	BW	BL	Qual.
1	Unified Team	2	0	18	10	QQ
2	Hungary	1	1	15	14	QQ
3	Canada	0	2	9	18	

Source: Official Report, vol. 2, p. 204

==== Round 1 Pool D ====
Pos	Team	W	L	BW	BL	Qual.
1	Germany	2	0	18	5	QQ
2	Poland	1	1	12	13	QQ
3	Great Britain	0	2	6	18	

Source: Official Report, vol. 2, p. 204

=== Elimination rounds ===
Fifth place
D2	Poland	6
D1	Germany	9
Seventh place
A1	Italy	7
A2	China	9

Consolation semifinals
A1	Italy	8
D2	Poland	8
D1	Germany	9
A2	China	4

Quarterfinals
A1	Italy	6
B2	Romania	8
C1	Unified Team	9
D2	Poland	2
D1	Germany	3
C2	Hungary	9
B1	France	9
A2	China	5

Semifinals
B2	Romania	6
C1	Unified Team	9
C2	Hungary	9
B1	France	1

Final
C1	Unified Team	9
C2	Hungary	5
Third place
B2	Romania	4
B1	France	9
