= 1989 World Fencing Championships =

International fencing competition

1989 World Championships in Fencing
- Dates: July 5–15
- Host city: Denver, United States

The 1989 World Fencing Championships were held in Denver, Colorado, United States from July 5 to July 15.

== Overview ==
The United States applied to organise World Fencing Championships as soon as the 1986 congress of the International Fencing Federation (FIE). They maintained their request the year after, suggesting Cleveland or Indianapolis as hosts. The latter was chosen, but withdrew three months before the event. Denver put itself forward as replacement.

The competition was marred by several incidents involving the directoire technique. For instance, Bulgaria's men sabre team unknowingly arrived late at their quarter-final match against West Germany, as the official timetable had been changed along the way; the West Germans protested, and the Bulgarians were disqualified.

The USSR and West Germany dominated the championships, especially in foil and sabre. Épée saw several surprises, notably the victory of Spain's Manuel Pereira, who had never placed in the Top 8 of an international tournament before, and who never reached that level again. Women's épée was still a young weapon, allowed by the FIE at the 1988 World Criterium as a demonstration event. It made its first official apparition in Denver. An outsider, Switzerland's Anja Straub, prevailed over Germany's Ute Schäper and Italy's Annalisa Coltorti, while the women's team event saw the beginning of the Hungarian domination.

== Medal table ==
Rank	Nation	Gold	Silver	Bronze	Total
1	Soviet Union (URS)	4	1	1	6
2	West Germany (FRG)	2	5	2	9
3	Italy (ITA)	1	2	3	6
4	Switzerland (SUI)	1	0	1	2
5	Hungary (HUN)	1	0	0	1
5	Spain (ESP)	1	0	0	1
7	France (FRA)	0	1	2	3
8	Poland (POL)	0	1	0	1
9	Cuba (CUB)	0	0	1	1
Totals (9 entries)		10	10	10	30

== Medal summary ==
=== Men's events ===
Event	Gold	Silver	Bronze
Individual Épée	Manuel Pereira (ESP)	Sandro Cuomo (ITA)	Pavel Kolobkov (URS)
Individual Foil	Alexander Koch (FRG)	Philippe Omnès (FRA)	Mauro Numa (ITA)
Individual Sabre	Grigory Kiriyenko (URS)	Jarosław Koniusz (POL)	Felix Becker (FRG)
Team Épée	Italy; Sandro Cuomo; Angelo Mazzoni; Stefano Pantano; Sandro Resegotti	West Germany; Elmar Borrmann; Robert Felisiak; Stefan Hörger; Thomas Gerull; Günter Jauch	Cuba; Wilfredo Loyola-Torriente; Nelson Loyola-Torriente; Pedro Merencio; Carlos Pedroso; Lazaro Castro
Team Foil	Soviet Union; Alexandr Romankov; Sergei Golubitsky; Ilgar Mammadov; Boris Koretsky; Dmitriy Shevchenko	West Germany; Thorsten Weidner; Matthias Gey; Thomas Endres; Alexander Koch	France; Philippe Conscience; Laurent Bel; Philippe Omnès; Patrice Lhôtellier
Team Sabre	Soviet Union; Grigory Kiriyenko; Andrey Alshan; Sergey Koryashkin; Sergey Mindirgasov	West Germany; Frank Bleckmann; Felix Becker; Jürgen Nolte; Ulrich Eifler; Jörg Kempenich	France; Jean-François Lamour; Philippe Delrieu; Franck Ducheix; Pierre Guichot; Jean-Philippe Daurelle

=== Women's events ===
Event	Gold	Silver	Bronze
Individual Épée	Anja Straub (SUI)	Ute Schäper (FRG)	Annalisa Coltorti (ITA)
Individual Foil	Olga Velichko (URS)	Anja Fichtel (FRG)	Zita Funkenhauser (FRG)
Team Épée	Hungary; Gyöngyi Szalay; Mariann Horváth; Marina Várkonyi; Diana Eöri; Zsuzsanna Szőcs	Italy; Annalisa Coltorti; Laura Chiesa; Elisa Uga; Alessandra Anglesio; Laura Chiesa	Switzerland; Suzanne Rompza; Isabelle Pentucci; Anja Straub; Gianna Bürki
Team Foil	West Germany; Anja Fichtel; Sabine Bau; Susanne Lang; Zita Funkenhauser; Anette Klug; Christiane Weber	Soviet Union; Olga Velichko; Tatyana Sadovskaya; Olga Voshchakina; Yelena Grishina; Yelena Glikina	Italy; Francesca Bartolozzi; Diana Bianchedi; Giovanna Trillini; Margherita Zalaffi
