= 1990 World Fencing Championships =

International fencing competition

1990 World Championships in Fencing
- Dates: July 8–16
- Host city: Lyon, France

The 1990 World Fencing Championships were held in Lyon, France. The event took place from July 8 to July 16, 1990.

== Medal summary ==
=== Men's events ===
Event	Gold	Silver	Bronze
Individual épée	(West Germany) Thomas Gerull	(Italy) Angelo Mazzoni	(West Germany) Arnd Schmitt
Individual foil	(France) Philippe Omnès	(Italy) Andrea Borella	(Soviet Union) Dmitriy Shevchenko
Individual sabre	(Hungary) György Nébald	(Soviet Union) Heorhiy Pohosov	(Italy) Tohni Terenzi
Team épée	Italy; Angelo Mazzoni; Sandro Cuomo; Maurizio Randazzo; Sandro Resegotti; Stefano Pantano	France; Olivier Lenglet; Éric Srecki; Jean-Michel Henry; Philippe Riboud; Jean-François Di Martino	Soviet Union; Pavel Kolobkov; Vitali Agueev; Andrey Shuvalov; Mykhailo Tyshko; Kaido Kaaberma
Team foil	Italy; Andrea Borella; Alessandro Puccini; Mauro Numa; Andrea Cipressa; Stefano Cerioni	Poland; Piotr Kielpikowski; Ryszard Sobczak; Leszek Bandach; Adam Krzesinski; Cezary Siess	Soviet Union; Dmitriy Shevchenko; Sergei Golubitsky; Vladimer Aptsiauri; Boris Koretsky; Alexandr Romankov
Team sabre	Soviet Union; Heorhiy Pohosov; Grigory Kiriyenko; Sergey Mindirgasov; Andrey Alshan; Samir Ibragimov	Hungary; György Nébald; Bence Szabó; Imre Bujdosó; Csaba Köves; László Csongrádi	West Germany; Felix Becker; Jürgen Nolte; Jörg Kempenich; Ulrich Eifler; Frank Bleckmann

=== Women's events ===
Event	Gold	Silver	Bronze
Individual épée	(Cuba) Taymi Chappé	(Hungary) Diana Eöri	(Soviet Union) Maria Mazina
Individual foil	(Germany) Anja Fichtel	(Italy) Giovanna Trillini	(Soviet Union) Olga Velichko
Team épée	Germany; Eva-Maria Ittner; Sabine Krapf; Renate Riebandt-Kaspar; Monika Ritz; Ute Schäper	Hungary; Mariann Horváth; Gyöngyi Szalay; Zsuzsanna Szőcs; Marina Várkonyi	Italy; Saba Amendolara; Alessandra Anglesio; Laura Chiesa; Annalisa Coltorti; Elisa Uga
Team foil	Italy; Lucia Traversa; Giovanna Trillini; Dorina Vaccaroni; Margherita Zalaffi	Soviet Union; Yelena Grishina; Tatyana Sadovskaya; Olga Sharkova-Sidorova; Olga Velichko	China; E Jie; Liang Jun; Sun Hongyun; Xiao Aihua

== Medal table ==
* Host nation (France)

Rank	Nation	Gold	Silver	Bronze	Total
1	Italy (ITA)	3	3	2	8
2	West Germany (FRG)	3	0	2	5
3	Hungary (HUN)	1	3	0	4
4	Soviet Union (URS)	1	2	5	8
5	France (FRA)*	1	1	0	2
6	Cuba (CUB)	1	0	0	1
7	Poland (POL)	0	1	0	1
8	China (CHN)	0	0	1	1
Totals (8 entries)		10	10	10	30
