= 1991 World Fencing Championships =

1991 World Championships in Fencing
- Dates: June 13–23
- Host city: Budapest, Hungary

The 1991 World Fencing Championships were held in Budapest, Hungary. The event took place from June 13 to June 23, 1991.

== Medal summary ==
=== Men's events ===
Event	Gold	Silver	Bronze
Individual Épée	(Soviet Union) Andrey Shuvalov	(Germany) Robert Felisiak	(Soviet Union) Sergey Kostarev (Hungary) Iván Kovács
Individual Foil	(Germany) Ingo Weissenborn	(Germany) Thorsten Weidner	(France) Laurent Bel (France) Youssef Hocine
Individual Sabre	(Soviet Union) Grigory Kiriyenko	(Hungary) Péter Abay	(Hungary) György Nébald (Soviet Union) Vadim Gutzeit
Team Épée	Soviet Union; Andrey Shuvalov; Serguei Kostarev; Serhiy Kravchuk; Kaido Kaaberma; Pavel Kolobkov	France; Éric Srecki; Robert Leroux; Olivier Lenglet; Hervé Faget; Jean-Michel Henry	Germany; Robert Felisiak; Marius Strzalka; Arnd Schmitt; Elmar Borrmann; Uwe Proske
Team Foil	Cuba; Elvis Gregory Gil; Oscar Garcia; Tulio Diaz; Guillermo Betancourt; Rolando Tucker	Germany; Ingo Weissenborn; Thorsten Weidner; Udo Wagner; Ulrich Schreck; Uwe Römer	France; Laurent Bel; Youssef Hocine; Philippe Omnes; Patrice Lhotellier; Olivier Lambert
Team Sabre	Hungary; Péter Abay; György Nébald; Bence Szabó; Csaba Köves; Imre Bujdosó	Soviet Union; Grigory Kiriyenko; Vadim Gutzeit; Aleksandr Shirshov; Sergei Bogoslowski; Andrey Alshan	Germany; Felix Becker; Jacek Huchwajda; Jürgen Nolte; Jörg Kempenich; Frank Bleckmann

=== Women's events ===
Event	Gold	Silver	Bronze
Individual Épée	(Hungary) Mariann Horváth	(Germany) Eva-Maria Ittner	(Soviet Union) Oksana Yermakova (Hungary) Marina Várkonyi
Individual Foil	(Italy) Giovanna Trillini	(Romania) Claudia Grigorescu	(Germany) Sabine Bau (Soviet Union) Tatiana Sadovskaia
Team Épée	Hungary; Mariann Horváth; Marina Várkonyi; Zsuzsanna Szőcs; Adrienne Hormay; Gyöngyi Szalay	France; Marie Hauterville; Brigitte Benon; Valérie Devaux; Valérie Barlois; Florence Topin	Soviet Union; Oksana Yermakova; Maria Mazina; Viktoria Titova; Elcate Lebedeva-Gorskai; Yuliya Garayeva
Team Foil	Italy; Giovanna Trillini; Dorina Vaccaroni; Francesca Bortolozzi; Diana Bianchedi; Margherita Zalaffi	Soviet Union; Tatyana Sadovskaya; Olga Velichko; Yelena Glikina; Olga Sidorova; Tatiana Napalkova	Germany; Sabine Bau; Zita Funkenhauser; Rosalia Huszti; Annette Dobmeier; Anja Fichtel

== Medal table ==
* Host nation (Hungary)

Rank	Nation	Gold	Silver	Bronze	Total
1	Soviet Union (URS)	3	2	5	10
2	Hungary (HUN)*	3	1	3	7
3	Italy (ITA)	2	0	0	2
4	Germany (GER)	1	4	4	9
5	Cuba (CUB)	1	0	0	1
6	France (FRA)	0	2	3	5
7	Romania (ROU)	0	1	0	1
Totals (7 entries)		10	10	15	35
