= László Csongrádi =

Hungarian fencer (born 1959)

Personal information
- Born: 5 July 1959 (age 67) Budapest, Hungary

Sport
- Sport: Fencing
- Club: Újpesti TE
Medal record
Men's fencing
Representing Hungary
Olympic Games
Gold medal – first place	1988 Seoul	Team sabre
World Championships
Silver medal – second place	1990 Lyon	Team sabre
Summer Universiade
Silver medal – second place	1985 Kobe	Individual sabre
Bronze medal – third place	1983 Edmonton	Team sabre

László Csongrádi (born 5 July 1959) is a Hungarian fencer, who won a gold medal in the team sabre competition at the 1988 Summer Olympics in Seoul together with György Nébald, Bence Szabó, Imre Bujdosó and Imre Gedővári.

In September 2024, Csongrádi's home was burglarized while he was sleeping and a thief stole his Olympic gold medal. He told the sports website Sportal that he is offering to leave the medal for the thief in his will if it were to be returned to him.
