= Péter Abay =

Hungarian fencer (born 1962)

Personal information
- Born: 13 May 1962 (age 64) Budapest, Hungary
- Height: 1.81 m (5 ft 11 in)
- Weight: 79 kg (174 lb)

Fencing career
- Sport: Fencing
- Country: Hungary
- Weapon: Sabre
- Club: Bp. Honvéd (1971–1988); Újpest (1988–1995)
- Former coach: Tamás Berczelédy, Tibor Pézsa, Péter Marót, Zarándi Csaba
Medal record
Men's sabre
Representing Hungary
Event	1st	2nd	3rd
Olympic Games	0	1	0
World Championships	2	2	0
European Championships	1	1	0
Total	3	4	0
Olympic Games
Silver medal – second place	1992 Barcelona	Team
World Championships
Gold medal – first place	1991 Budapest	Team
Gold medal – first place	1993 Essen	Team
Silver medal – second place	1983 Vienna	Team
Silver medal – second place	1991 Budapest	Individual
European Championships
Gold medal – first place	1991 Vienna	Team
Silver medal – second place	1991 Vienna	Individual

Péter Abay (born 13 May 1962) is a Hungarian fencer, who won a silver medal in the team sabre competition at the 1992 Summer Olympics in Barcelona together with György Nébald, Bence Szabó, Imre Bujdosó and Csaba Köves.

== Awards ==
- Hungarian fencer of the Year (1): 1991

Orders and special awards

- Cross of Merit of the Republic of the Hungary – Silver Cross (1992)
