= Gary Fletcher =

Gary Fletcher may refer to:

- Gary Fletcher (musician), blues musician, best known for playing bass in The Blues Band
- Gary Taylor-Fletcher (born 1981), English professional footballer, formerly just called Gary Fletcher
- Gary Fletcher (fencer) (born 1962), British fencer
