= Peinador =

Peinador may refer to:

- Raúl Peinador (born 1968), Spanish fencer
- Vigo–Peinador Airport, an airport in Spain
