= Heorhiy Pohosov =

Ukrainian Soviet fencer

George Pogosov
Personal information
- Born: 14 July 1960 (age 65) Kyiv, Ukrainian SSR, Soviet Union

Sport
- Sport: Fencing
Medal record
Men's fencing
Representing Soviet Union
Silver medal – second place	1988 Seoul	Sabre team
Representing the Unified Team
Gold medal – first place	1992 Barcelona	Sabre team
World Championships
Representing Soviet Union
Gold medal – first place	1983 Vienna	Team sabre
Gold medal – first place	1985 Barcelona	Team sabre
Gold medal – first place	1986 Sofia	Team sabre
Gold medal – first place	1987 Lausanne	Team sabre
Gold medal – first place	1989 Denver	Team sabre
Gold medal – first place	1990 Lyon	Team sabre
Silver medal – second place	1990 Lyon	Individual sabre
Summer Universiade
Representing Soviet Union
Gold medal – first place	1985 Kobe	Team sabre
Representing Soviet Union
Friendship Games
Gold medal – first place	1984 Moscow	Team sabre

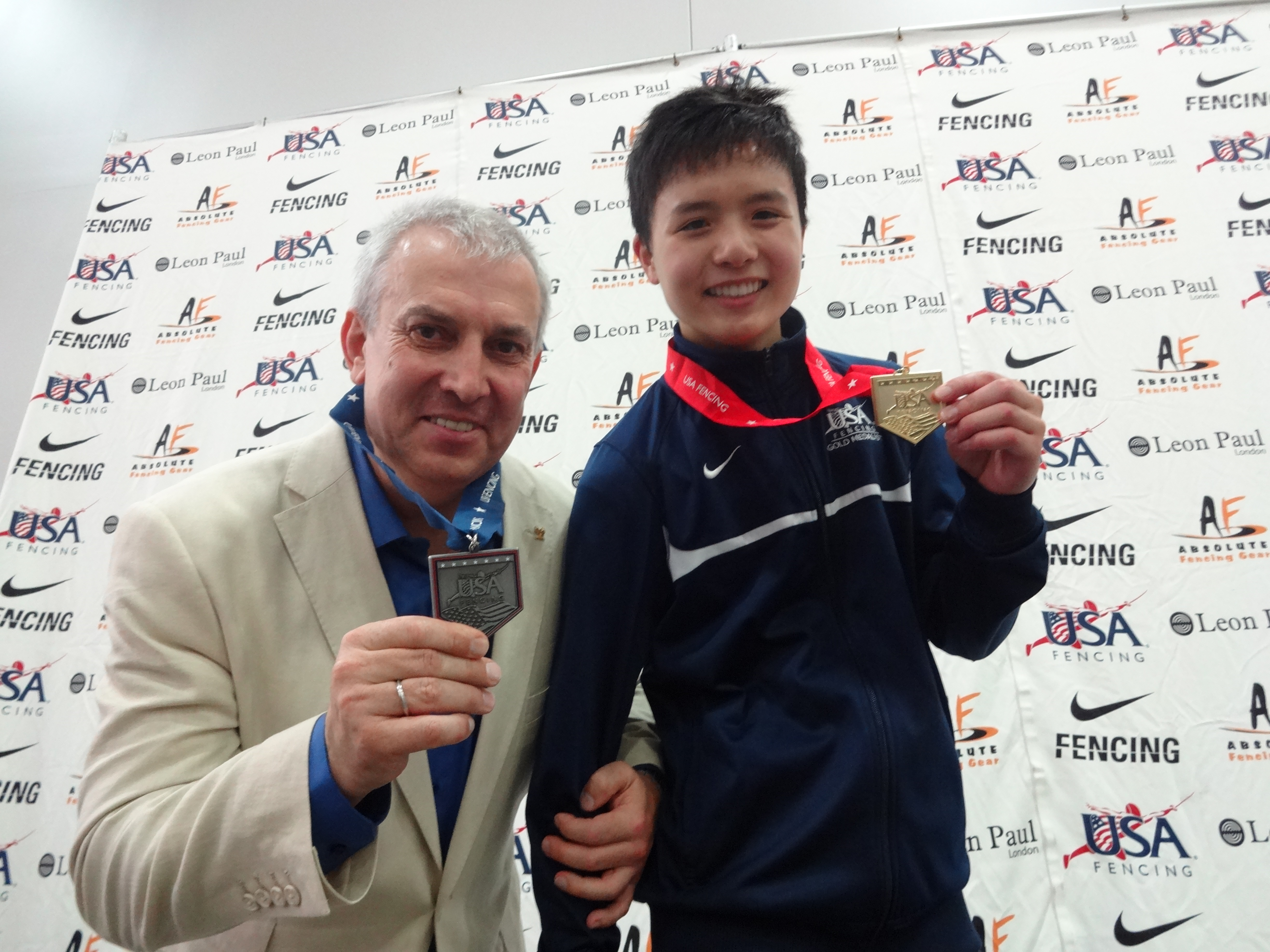
Pogosov with his student, Samuel kwong in the 2013 Columbus Ohio national championships

Heorhiy Vadimovich Pohosov (Ukrainian: Георгій Вадимович Погосов; born 14 July 1960), also known as George Pogosov, is a retired Soviet/Ukrainian sabre fencer. He won two Olympic medals.

== Biography ==
Pohosov has a master's degree in physical education with a focus in fencing. He graduated from the National University of Physical Education and Sport of Ukraine.

His first coach was Mikhail Shimshovich.

Pohosov was the coach of the Ukrainian National Team before coming to the US. In 1999, Pohosov came to Stanford University's fencing program. He is the co-head coach for the Stanford men's and women's varsity fencing teams as well as the head coach for the Cardinal Fencing Club, Stanford's recreational fencing outlet. In addition to his Olympic medals, his honors include Junior World Champion and six-time World Champion (1983.1985.1986.1987,1989.1990). In the United States, he teaches all fencing weapons and works with fencers of all levels, instructing classes for children, teenagers, and adults.

A number of Pohosov's students have become finalists and champions of various National tournaments, including Samuel Kwong and Erika Yong.

He was born and lived in Kyiv.

He is a head coach for Cardinal Fencing club, a fencing club located in Mountain View, California . Many of his students in that club are rated fencers and some have even gotten onto Stanford's fencing roster. George Pogosov is a well renowned coach in USA fencing.

His student, Grace Ker, has recently won gold at the Cadet world Championships and is now a fencer for Stanford university.
