= Élő =

Élő [ˈeːløː] is a Hungarian surname. Written with a lower-case é it is as well the present participle of the Hungarian verb él ("to live") – thus translating as "living", "alive" or "live" – and may refer to:

- Árpád Élő (1903–1992), Hungarian American physicist
- Norbert Élő (born 1967), Hungarian politician
- Róbert Élő (born 1969), Hungarian gymnast
