= 1992 World Fencing Championships =

International fencing competition

1992 World Championships in Fencing
- Dates: July 10–12
- Host city: Havana, Cuba

The 1992 World Fencing Championships were held from 10 July to 12 July 1992 in Havana, Cuba for women's team épée and women's individual épée, both of which were not held at the 1992 Summer Olympics.

== Medal summary ==
Event	Gold	Silver	Bronze
Women's Individual Épée	Mariann Horváth (HUN)	Sophie Moressée-Pichot (FRA)	Pernette Osinga (NED); Maria Mazina (CIS)
Women's Team Épée	Hungary; Mariann Horváth; Marina Várkonyi; Tímea Nagy; Zsuzsanna Szőcs	Germany; Renate Riebandt-Kaspar; Dagmar Ophardt; Imke Duplitzer; Eva-Maria Ittner	Italy; Laura Chiesa; Elisa Uga; Corinna Panzeri; Saba Amendolara

== Medal table ==
Rank	Nation	Gold	Silver	Bronze	Total
1	Hungary (HUN)	2	0	0	2
2	France (FRA)	0	1	0	1
2	Germany (GER)	0	1	0	1
4	CIS (CIS)	0	0	1	1
4	Italy (ITA)	0	0	1	1
4	Netherlands (NED)	0	0	1	1
Totals (6 entries)		2	2	3	7

== See also ==
- Fencing at the 1992 Summer Olympics
