= 1991 European Fencing Championships =

Sports event in Austria

The 1991 European Fencing Championships were held in Vienna, Austria.

== Medal summary ==
=== Men's events ===
Event	Gold	Silver	Bronze
Épée	Iván Kovács (HUN)	Jean-Marc Muratorio (FRA)	Jiří Douba (TCH); Arno Strohmeyer (AUT)
Team épée	Germany	Austria	Czechoslovakia
Foil	István Busa (HUN)	Michael Ludwig (AUT)	Zsolt Érsek (HUN); Bogusław Zych (POL)
Team foil	Hungary	France	Poland
Sabre	Bence Szabó (HUN)	Péter Abay (HUN)	Zissis Babanassis (GRE); György Nébald (HUN)
Team sabre	Hungary	France	Austria

=== Women's events ===
Event	Gold	Silver	Bronze
Foil	Zsuzsa Jánosi (HUN)	Ildikó Pusztai (HUN)	Monika Weber (GER); Lucia Traversa (ITA)
Team foil	Hungary	Bulgaria	France
Épée	Mariann Horváth (HUN)	Zsuzsanna Szőcs (HUN)	Pernette Osinga (NED); Gyöngyi Szalay (HUN)
Team épée	Hungary	Austria	Poland

=== Medal table ===
Rank	Nation	Gold	Silver	Bronze	Total
1	Hungary	9	3	3	15
2	Germany	1	0	1	2
3	Austria	0	3	2	5
4	France	0	3	1	4
5	Bulgaria	0	1	0	1
6	Poland	0	0	3	3
7	Czechoslovakia	0	0	2	2
8	Greece	0	0	1	1
8	Italy	0	0	1	1
8	Netherlands	0	0	1	1
Totals (10 entries)		10	10	15	35
