= Annalisa Coltorti =

Italian fencer (born 1963)

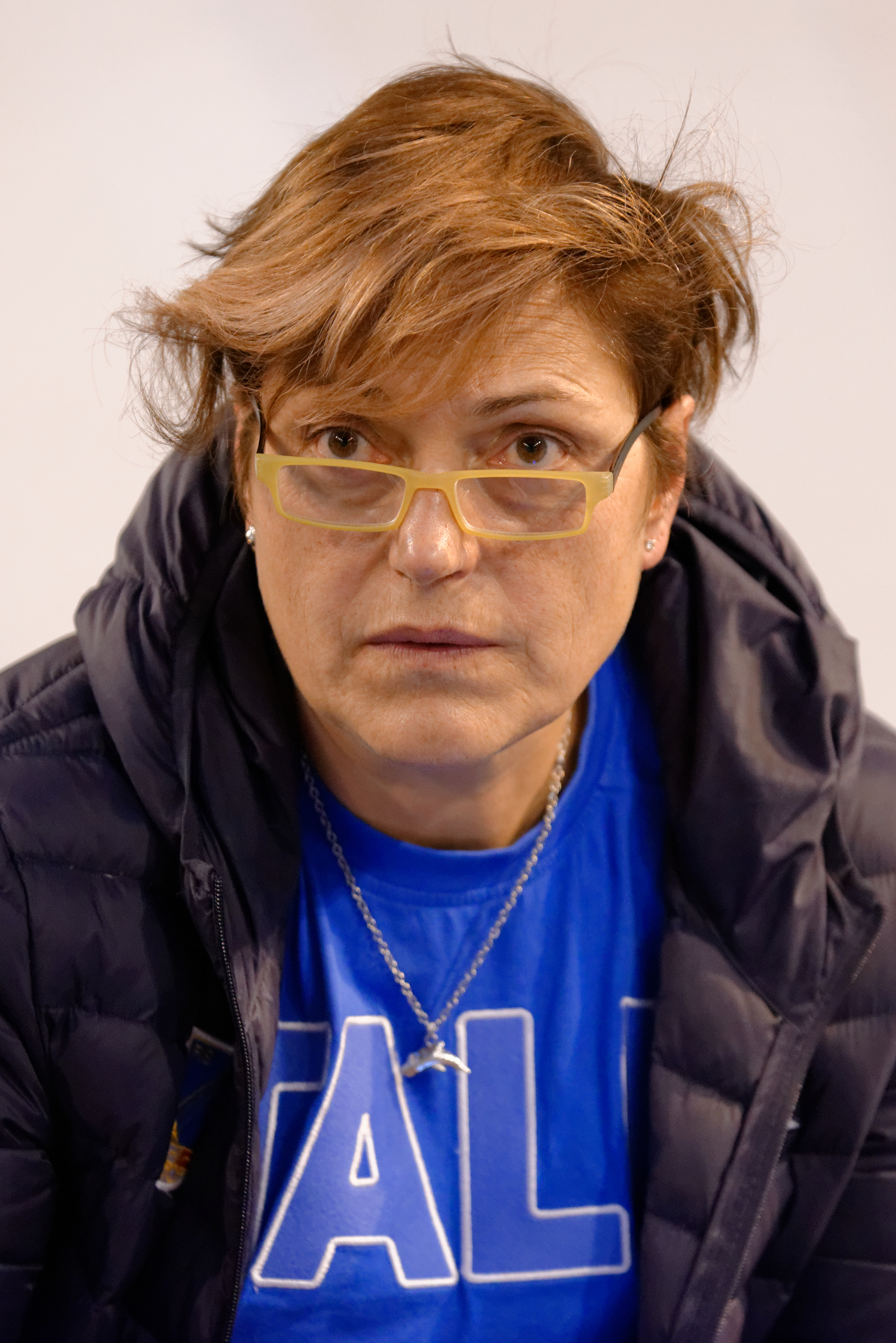

Personal information
- Born: 16 February 1963 (age 63) Iesi, Italy

Fencing career
- Sport: Fencing
- Weapon: foil, épée
- Hand: right-handed
- Club: CS Jesi
- Head coach: Ezio Triccoli
Medal record
Women's épée
Representing Italy
World Championships
Silver medal – second place	1989 Denver	Team
Bronze medal – third place	1989 Denver	Individual
Bronze medal – third place	1990 Lyon	Team

Annalisa Coltorti (born 16 February 1963) is an Italian épée fencer.

Coltorti took up fencing at her local club, CS Jesi. She first learnt foil under maestro Ezio Triccoli before switching to épée when it opened to women. She earned an individual bronze medal and a team silver medal at Denver 1989, the first World Fencing Championships formally allowing the event. She went on to gain a team bronze medal at the 1991 World Championships in Lyon.

After she retired as an athlete in 1993, Coltorti became physical trainer at CS Jesi and for the national women's foil team, working amongst others with Olympic champions Valentina Vezzali and Elisa Di Francisca.
