= Mariann Horváth =

Hungarian fencer (born 1968)

Personal information
- Born: September 23, 1968 (age 57)

Fencing career
- Sport: Fencing
- Weapon: épée
- Hand: right-handed
Medal record
Women's épée
Representing Hungary
World Championships
Gold medal – first place	1989 Denver	Team épée
Gold medal – first place	1991 Budapest	Individual épée
Gold medal – first place	1991 Budapest	Team épée
Gold medal – first place	1992 Havana	Individual épée
Gold medal – first place	1992 Havana	Team épée
Gold medal – first place	1993 Essen	Team épée
Silver medal – second place	1990 Lyon	Team épée
Silver medal – second place	1994 Athens	Team épée
European Championships
Gold medal – first place	1991 Vienna	Individual épée
Gold medal – first place	1991 Vienna	Team épée
Summer Universiade
Gold medal – first place	1989 Duisburg	Team épée
Gold medal – first place	1991 Sheffield	Individual épée
Gold medal – first place	1991 Sheffield	Team épée
Gold medal – first place	1993 Buffalo	Individual épée
Gold medal – first place	1993 Buffalo	Team épée

Mariann Horváth (born 23 September 1968) is a Hungarian épée fencer, twice individual world champion and four-time team world champion.

Horváth was one of the first women épée champions after the event was introduced by the International Fencing Federation at the 1988 World Fencing Championships.

She commented fencing at the 2012 Summer Olympics for the Hungarian Television. Her emotional account of Áron Szilágyi's victory in men's sabre drew the ire of radio host Gábor Bochkor, who commented that Horváth became "over-emotional" and that he would've "turned off the mic and slapped her twice". The comment drew criticism and Bochkor later issued an apology, but Horváth dismissed it.

== Awards ==
- Hungarian fencer of the Year (1): 1991, 1992
- Gundel Art award (2012)
- János Sípos award (2016)
