= Olga Velichko =

Russian fencer

Personal information
- Born: 20 November 1965 (age 60) Vladikavkaz, Soviet Union

Sport
- Country: Soviet Union; Russia
- Sport: Fencing
Medal record
Representing Soviet Union
World Championships
Gold medal – first place	1986 Sofia	Team foil
Gold medal – first place	1989 Denver	Individual foil
Silver medal – second place	1989 Denver	Team foil
Silver medal – second place	1990 Lyon	Team foil
Silver medal – second place	1991 Budapest	Team foil
Bronze medal – third place	1985 Barcelona	Team foil
Bronze medal – third place	1990 Lyon	Individual foil
Summer Universiade
Silver medal – second place	1985 Kobe	Team foil

Olga Yevgenyevna Velichko (born 20 November 1965) is a Russian foil fencer. She competed for the Unified Team at the 1992 Summer Olympics and for Russia at the 1996 Summer Olympics.
