= Gyula Nyári =

Hungarian sailor (born 1965)

Personal information
- Nationality: Hungarian
- Born: 31 March 1965 (age 60) Székesfehérvár, Hungary

Sport
- Sport: Sailing

Gyula Nyári (born 31 March 1965) is a Hungarian sailor. He competed at the 1988 Summer Olympics and the 1992 Summer Olympics.
