= Attila Kálnoki-Kiss =

Hungarian modern pentathlete

Personal information
- Born: 30 October 1965 (age 60)

Sport
- Sport: Modern pentathlon
Medal record
Men's modern pentathlon
Representing Hungary
World Championships
Gold medal – first place	1989 Budapest	Relay
Silver medal – second place	1990 Lahti	Relay
Gold medal – first place	1991 San Antonio	Relay
Gold medal – first place	1993 Darmstadt	Relay
Gold medal – first place	1994 Sheffield	Relay
Gold medal – first place	1995 Basel	Team
European Championships
Gold medal – first place	1991 Rome	Team
Gold medal – first place	1993 Sofia	Team
Bronze medal – third place	1995 San Benedetto	Individual
Gold medal – first place	1995 San Benedetto	Team

Attila Kálnoki-Kiss (born Attila Kálnoki Kis, 30 October 1965) is a Hungarian modern pentathlete. He is a five-time World Champion of the sport, and has competed at the 1992 Summer Olympics.

== Politics career ==
In 2026, he was announced to be the secretary of state responsible for sport in the Magyar government.
