= Esteban Mullins =

Costa Rican fencer

Personal information
- Born: 2 February 1967 (age 59)

Sport
- Sport: Fencing

Esteban Mullins (born 2 February 1967) is a Costa Rican fencer. He competed in the individual sabre event at the 1992 Summer Olympics.
