= Marco Marin =

Italian politician and fencer

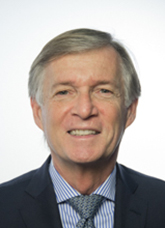

Personal information
- Born: 4 July 1963 (age 63) Padua, Italy

Sport
- Sport: Fencing
Medal record
Men's fencing
Representing Italy
Olympic Games
Gold medal – first place	1984 Los Angeles	Team sabre
Silver medal – second place	1984 Los Angeles	Individual sabre
Silver medal – second place	1992 Barcelona	Individual sabre
Bronze medal – third place	1988 Seoul	Team sabre
World Championships
Gold medal – first place	1995 The Hague	Team sabre
Silver medal – second place	1982 Rome	Team sabre
Silver medal – second place	1993 Essen	Team sabre
Bronze medal – third place	1983 Vienna	Team sabre
Summer Universiade
Gold medal – first place	1983 Edmonton	Individual sabre
Silver medal – second place	1983 Edmonton	Team sabre
Silver medal – second place	1991 Sheffield	Team sabre
Bronze medal – third place	1985 Kobe	Team sabre

Marco Marin (born 4 July 1963) is an Italian politician, dentist and fencer. He won a gold, two silvers and a bronze in sabre events at three Olympic Games between 1984 and 1992. He served as a Senator between 2013 and 2018, before joining the Chamber of Deputies in 2018.
