= Olivér Gáspár =

Hungarian sports shooter (born 1973)

Personal information
- Full name: Olivér Nándor Gáspár
- Nationality: Hungarian
- Born: 12 January 1973 (age 52) Budapest, Hungary

Sport
- Sport: Sports shooting

Olivér Nándor Gáspár (born 12 January 1973) is a Hungarian sports shooter. He competed at the 1988 Summer Olympics and the 1992 Summer Olympics.
