= Zsolt Nyári =

Hungarian sailor (born 1969)

Personal information
- Nationality: Hungarian
- Born: 29 August 1969 (age 56) Székesfehérvár, Hungary

Sport
- Sport: Sailing

Zsolt Nyári (born 29 August 1969) is a Hungarian sailor. He competed at the 1988 Summer Olympics, the 1992 Summer Olympics, and the 1996 Summer Olympics.
