= Youssef Hocine =

French fencer

Personal information
- Born: 7 August 1965 (age 60) Melun, France

Sport
- Sport: Fencing

Youssef Hocine (born 7 August 1965) is a French fencer. He competed in the team foil events at the 1988 and 1992 Summer Olympics.
