= Marco Antonio Rioja =

Spanish fencer

Personal information
- Born: 1 April 1964 (age 62) Madrid, Spain

Sport
- Sport: Fencing

Marco Antonio Rioja (born 1 April 1964) is a Spanish fencer. He competed in the team sabre event at the 1992 Summer Olympics.
