= Margherita Zalaffi =

Italian fencer (born 1966)

Personal information
- Born: 7 April 1966 (age 60) Siena, Italy

Sport
- Sport: Fencing
Medal record
Women's fencing
Representing Italy
Olympic Games
Gold medal – first place	1992 Barcelona	Team foil
Silver medal – second place	1988 Seoul	Team foil
Silver medal – second place	1996 Atlanta	Team épée
World Championships
Gold medal – first place	1982 Rome	Team foil
Gold medal – first place	1990 Lyon	Team foil
Gold medal – first place	1991 Budapest	Team foil
Silver medal – second place	1986 Sofia	Team foil
Bronze medal – third place	1987 Lausanne	Team foil
Bronze medal – third place	1989 Denver	Team foil
Mediterranean Games
Gold medal – first place	1993 Languedoc	Individual foil
Summer Universiade
Gold medal – first place	1985 Kobe	Team foil
Gold medal – first place	1989 Duisburg	Team foil
Gold medal – first place	1991 Sheffield	Team foil
Gold medal – first place	1993 Buffalo	Team foil
Silver medal – second place	1991 Sheffield	Team épée
Bronze medal – third place	1991 Sheffield	Individual foil

Margherita Zalaffi (born 7 April 1966) is an Italian former fencer. She won a gold medal in the women's team foil event at the 1992 Summer Olympics and silver at the same event in 1988 and in the women's team épée in 1996. She competed at five consecutive Olympic Games from 1984 to 2000.

== See also ==
- List of athletes with the most appearances at Olympic Games
