= Ricardo Menalda =

Brazilian fencer

Personal information
- Born: 28 September 1965 (age 60)

Sport
- Sport: Fencing

Ricardo Menalda (born 28 September 1965) is a Brazilian fencer. He competed in the individual sabre event at the 1992 Summer Olympics.
