= Manuel Pereira (fencer) =

Spanish fencer

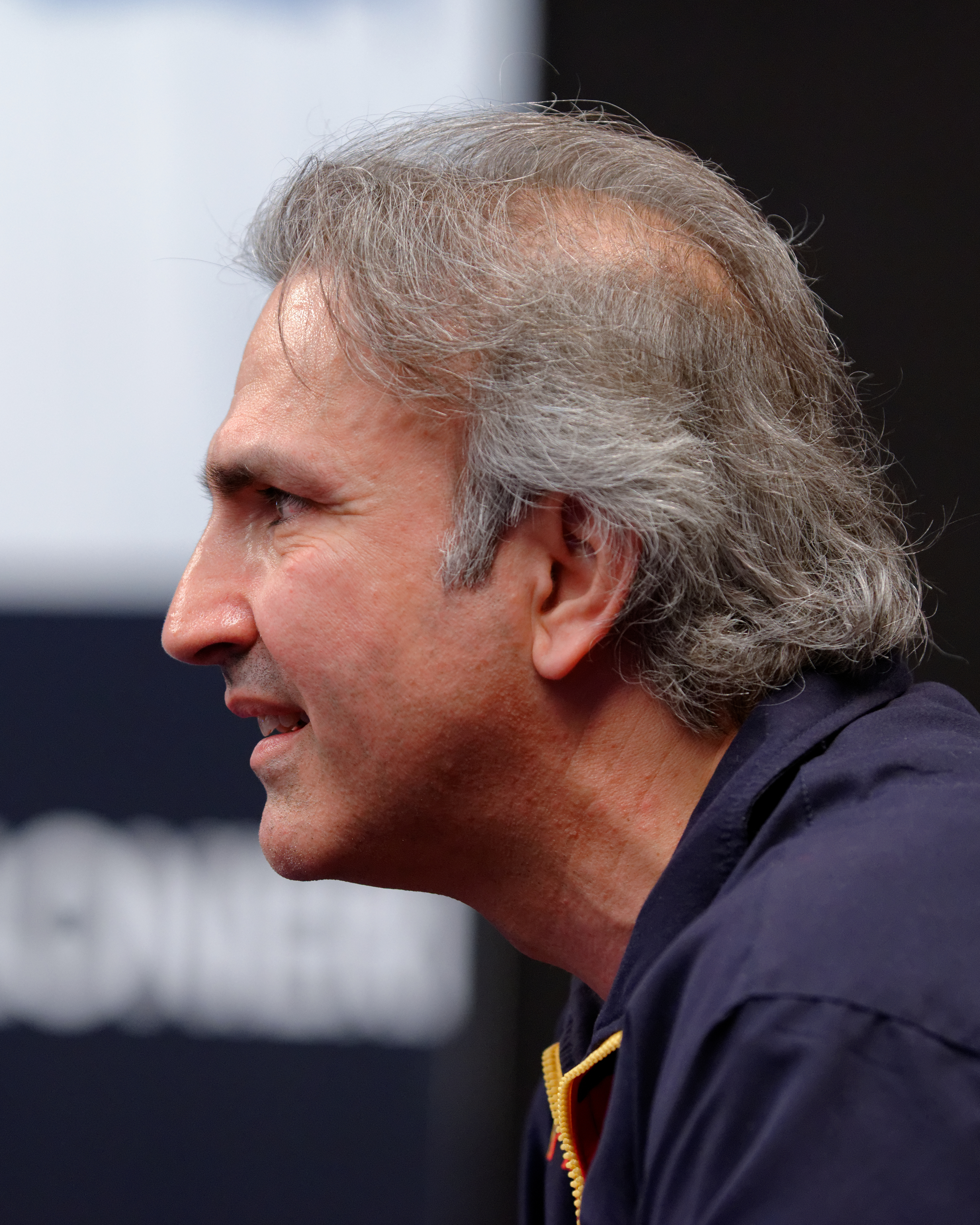

Personal information
- Full name: Manuel Pereira Senabre
- Born: 18 June 1961 (age 65) Madrid, Spain
- Home town: Las Rozas de Madrid
- Height: 1.80 m (5 ft 11 in)

Fencing career
- Sport: Fencing
- Country: Spain
- Weapon: épée
- Hand: right-handed
Medal record
World Championships
Gold medal – first place	1989 Denver	Épée

Manuel Pereira (born 18 June 1961) is a Spanish fencer. In 1989 he became the first Spaniard to earn a gold medal in épée in the World Fencing Championships. He also competed in the individual and team épée events at the 1988 and 1992 Summer Olympics.

Pereira became a coach after his retirement as a sportsman. Under his supervision, Spain won a gold medal in women's team épée at the 2004 World Fencing Championships in Lisbon. He was inducted in 2014 in the Hall of Fame of the Fédération Internationale d'Escrime. His son Yulen is a member of the Spanish épée team.
