= Fencing at the 1991 Summer Universiade =

Fencing events were contested at the 1991 Summer Universiade in Sheffield, United Kingdom.

== Medal overview ==
=== Men's events ===
Event	Gold	Silver	Bronze
Individual Foil	Dmitriy Shevchenko (URS)	Alessandro Puccini (ITA)	Luca Vitalesta (ITA)
Team Foil	Italy (ITA)	Soviet Union (URS)	Poland (POL)
Individual Épée	Pavel Kolobkov (URS)	Maurizio Randazzo (ITA)	Robert Leroux (FRA)
Team Épée	Germany (GER)	Soviet Union (URS)	France (FRA)
Individual Sabre	Grigory Kiriyenko (URS)	Csaba Köves (HUN)	Jörg Kempenich (GER)
Team Sabre	Germany (GER)	Italy (ITA)	Soviet Union (URS)

=== Women's events ===
Event	Gold	Silver	Bronze
Individual Foil	Giovanna Trillini (ITA)	Xiao Aihua (CHN)	Margherita Zalaffi (ITA)
Team Foil	Italy (ITA)	China (CHN)	Poland (POL)
Individual Épée	Mariann Horváth (HUN)	Ute Schäper (GER)	Wen Dong (CHN)
Team Épée	Hungary (HUN)	Italy (ITA)	France (FRA)

== Medal table ==
Rank	Nation	Gold	Silver	Bronze	Total
1	Italy (ITA)	3	4	2	9
2	Soviet Union (URS)	3	2	1	6
3	Germany (GER)	2	1	1	4
4	Hungary (HUN)	2	1	0	3
5	China (CHN)	0	2	1	3
6	France (FRA)	0	0	3	3
7	Poland (POL)	0	0	2	2
Totals (7 entries)		10	10	10	30
