= Samuel Kwong =

American sabre fencer (born 1998)

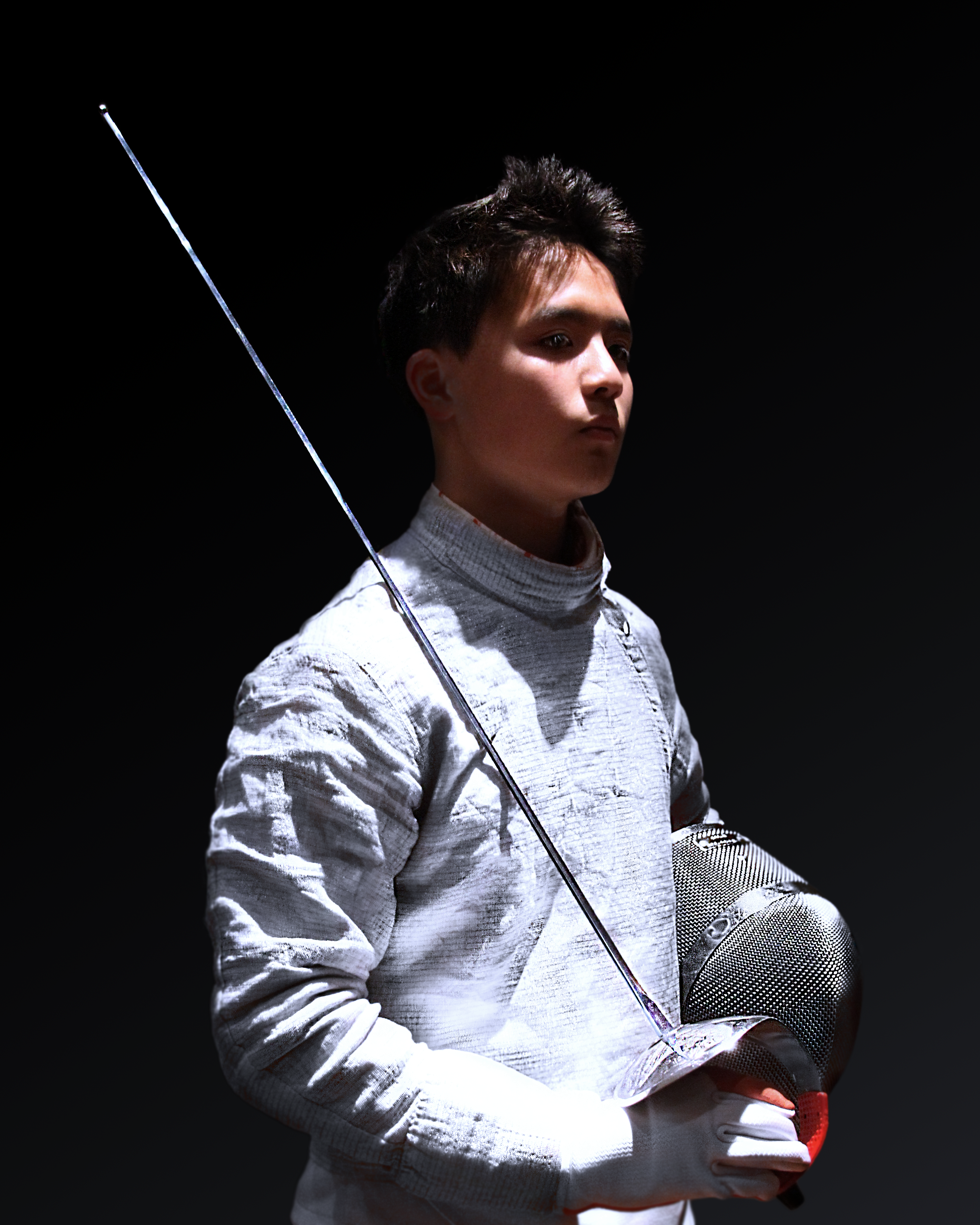

Personal information
- Born: January 1, 1998 (age 28)

Fencing career
- Sport: Fencing
- Country: United States
- Weapon: Sabre
- Hand: Right
Medal record
Men's Sabre
Representing United States
United States National Championships
Bronze medal – third place	2013 Baltimore, Maryland Junior Olympics	Cadet Men's Sabre
Gold medal – first place	2013 Columbus, Ohio National Championship	Youth-14 Men's Sabre
Gold medal – first place	2015 Richmond, Virginia Junior Olympics	Junior Men's Team Sabre
Gold medal – first place	2016 Dallas, Texas National Championship	Division I-A Men's Sabre

Samuel Kwong (born January 1, 1998, in Pleasanton, California) is an American sabre fencer. He is a multiple-time national champion.

== Achievements ==
Kwong held the national #1 rank in each concluding year of Youth-10, Youth-12, and Youth-14. Altogether he won 10 North American Cup top-8 finalist medals between 2009 and 2013—including 3 gold and 3 bronze. In 2013 he won the Youth-14 National Championship in Columbus, Ohio, and in 2016 he won the Division I-A National Championship in Dallas, Texas.

He was the youngest male sabre fencer in the United States with an A rating in the 2012-2013 season and the youngest men's sabre fencer to represent United States internationally in the 2012-2013 season, at 14 years old winning United States's first medal for the season at the 2012 Cadet European Circuit in Konin, Poland.

He won an Under-17 bronze medal at the 2013 Junior Olympics in Baltimore, Maryland and as team captain an Under-19 team gold medal at the 2015 Junior Olympics in Richmond, Virginia.

At the 2016 USA Fencing Summer Nationals in Dallas, Texas, Kwong won three medals in a row, becoming the only fencer to have won three medals on three consecutive days in Junior and Senior national events. He won bronze in the Junior Men's Saber Challenge, gold in the Division I-A Men's Saber National Championship, and bronze in the Division I Men's Saber Challenge.

As a freshman for Stanford he won gold at the 2017 NCAA Western Regional Championships. He did not compete in his sophomore year. As a junior he returned and won another gold at the 2019 NCAA Western Regional Championships.

== Personal ==
He is the son of Raymond and Emma Kwong and the younger brother of Princeton Kwong, an American national champion figure skater.
