= Dmitry Shevchenko (fencer) =

Russian fencer (born 1967)

Dmitriy Shevchenko
Personal information
- Full name: Dmitriy Stepanovich Shevchenko
- Born: 13 November 1967 (age 58) Moscow, Russian SFSR, Soviet Union

Sport
- Sport: Fencing
- Event: Foil
Medal record
Men's fencing
Representing Russia
Olympic Games
Gold medal – first place	1996 Atlanta	Team foil
Bronze medal – third place	2000 Sydney	Individual foil
World Championships
Gold medal – first place	1995 The Hague	Individual foil
Silver medal – second place	1995 The Hague	Team foil
Summer Universiade
Gold medal – first place	1995 Fukuoka	Team foil
Silver medal – second place	1995 Fukuoka	Individual foil
Representing Soviet Union
World Championships
Gold medal – first place	1989 Denver	Team foil
Bronze medal – third place	1990 Lyon	Individual foil
Bronze medal – third place	1990 Lyon	Team foil
Summer Universiade
Gold medal – first place	1991 Sheffield	Individual foil
Silver medal – second place	1991 Sheffield	Team foil

Dmitriy Stepanovich Shevchenko (also spelled Chevtchenko, Russian: Дмитрий Степанович Шевченко, born 13 November 1967) is a Russian fencer, who won a gold Olympic medal in the team foil competition at the 1996 Summer Olympics in Atlanta and bronze Olympic medal in the individual foil competition at the 2000 Summer Olympics in Sydney.
