= Sami Al-Baker =

Saudi Arabian fencer

Personal information
- Born: 4 September 1971 (age 54)

Sport
- Sport: Fencing

Sami Al-Baker (born 4 September 1971) is a Saudi Arabian fencer. He competed in the individual sabre event at the 1992 Summer Olympics.
