= Yang Zhen (fencer) =

Chinese fencer

Personal information
- Born: 26 September 1967 (age 58)

Sport
- Sport: Fencing

Yang Zhen (simplified Chinese: 杨震; traditional Chinese: 楊震; pinyin: Yáng Zhèn; born 26 September 1967) is a Chinese fencer. He competed in the individual and team sabre events at the 1992 Summer Olympics.
