= Zisis Babanasis =

Greek fencer (born 1964)

Personal information
- Born: 3 August 1964 (age 61) Budapest, Hungary

Sport
- Sport: Fencing

Zisis Babanasis (born 3 August 1964) is a Greek fencer. He competed in the individual sabre events at the 1984 and 1992 Summer Olympics.
