= Jörg Kempenich =

German fencer

Personal information
- Nationality: German
- Born: 30 May 1965 (age 61) Bonn, West Germany
- Height: 185 cm (73 in)
- Weight: 82 kg (181 lb)

Sport
- Sport: Fencing
Medal record
Representing West Germany
World Championships
Silver medal – second place	1989 Denver	Team sabre
Bronze medal – third place	1990 Lyon	Team sabre
Representing Germany
World Championships
Bronze medal – third place	1991 Budapest	Team sabre
Summer Universiade
Gold medal – first place	1991 Sheffield	Team sabre
Bronze medal – third place	1991 Sheffield	Individual sabre

Jörg Kempenich (born 30 May 1965) is a German fencer. He competed in the sabre events at the 1988 and 1992 Summer Olympics. He won a bronze medal in both the 1990, and 1991 World Championships, as well as a silver in the 1989 Worlds.
