= Hein van Garderen =

South African fencer

Personal information
- Born: 7 March 1969 (age 57)

Sport
- Sport: Fencing

Hein van Garderen (born 7 March 1969) is a South African épée, foil and sabre fencer. He competed in three events at the 1992 Summer Olympics.
