= Daniel Grigore =

Romanian fencer

Personal information
- Born: 22 July 1969 (age 56)

Sport
- Sport: Fencing
- Club: La fencing Pomona and Los Angeles International fencing center

Daniel Grigore (born 22 July 1969) is a Romanian fencer. He competed in the individual and team sabre events at the 1992 Summer Olympics.
