= Ian Williams (fencer) =

Personal information
- Born: 26 October 1967 (age 58) Bexleyheath, London, England

Sport
- Country: English
- Sport: Fencing

Ian James Williams (born 26 October 1967) is a former Olympian, fencing champion and fencing coach.

== Fencing career ==
Williams competed at the 1992 Summer Olympics. He was a four times British fencing champion, winning the sabre title at the British Fencing Championships in 1989, 1991, 1992 and 1998.

== Coaching ==
He became the Great Britain sabre lead talent coach and was the National sabre coach for Team GB (2006–2008). He is the head coach at Camden Fencing Club in London. Williams was coached by Christian Bauer and Péter Fröhlich for a number of years, and together with James Williams they run a successful summer training camp in the UK. He is left-handed and now coaches fencing at Whitgift school in South Croydon.

== International Competitions ==
| Competition | Year | Result |
|---|---|---|
| Olympic Games Barcelona | 1992 | 32nd Team 12th |
