= Sandro Resegotti =

Italian fencer (born 1966)

Personal information
- Born: 25 January 1966 (age 60)

Sport
- Sport: Fencing

Sandro Resegotti (born 25 January 1966) is an Italian fencer. He competed in the team épée event at the 1992 Summer Olympics.
