= José Luis Álvarez (fencer) =

Spanish fencer (born 1969)

Personal information
- Born: 22 January 1969 (age 57) Madrid, Spain

Sport
- Sport: Fencing

José Luis Álvarez (born 22 January 1969) is a Spanish fencer. He competed in the individual and team sabre events at the 1992 Summer Olympics.
