= Róbert Élő =

Hungarian gymnast (born 1969)

- Born: 17 October 1969 (age 56) Győr, Hungarian People's Republic
- Height: 1.76 m (5 ft 9 in)

Gymnastics career
- Discipline: Men's artistic gymnastics
- Country represented: Hungary
- Club: Újpesti Tornaegylet

Róbert Élő (born 17 October 1969) is a Hungarian gymnast. He competed in twelve events at the 1992 Summer Olympics.
