= Grigory Kiriyenko =

Russian fencer (born 1965)

Personal information
- Born: 29 September 1965 (age 60) Moscow, Russian SFSR, Soviet Union

Sport
- Sport: Fencing
Medal record
Representing Unified Team
Olympic Games
Gold medal – first place	1992 Barcelona	Sabre team
Representing Russia
Olympic Games
Gold medal – first place	1996 Atlanta	Sabre team
World Championships
Gold medal – first place	1993 Essen	Individual sabre
Gold medal – first place	1994 Athens	Team sabre
Gold medal – first place	1995 The Hague	Individual sabre
Silver medal – second place	1995 The Hague	Team sabre
Silver medal – second place	1997 Cape Town	Individual sabre
Bronze medal – third place	1994 Athens	Individual sabre
Representing Soviet Union
World Championships
Gold medal – first place	1989 Denver	Individual sabre
Gold medal – first place	1989 Denver	Team sabre
Gold medal – first place	1990 Lyon	Team sabre
Gold medal – first place	1991 Budapest	Individual sabre
Silver medal – second place	1991 Budapest	Team sabre
Summer Universiade
Gold medal – first place	1991 Sheffield	Individual sabre
Bronze medal – third place	1991 Sheffield	Team sabre

Grigory Anatolyevich Kiriyenko (Russian: Григорий Анатольевич Кириенко) (born 29 September 1965 in Novosibirsk) is a Russian fencer, who won two gold Olympic medals in the team sabre competition: at the 1992 Summer Olympics in Barcelona and at the 1996 Summer Olympics in Atlanta.
