= Luís Silva (fencer) =

Portuguese fencer

Personal information
- Born: 3 May 1972 (age 54) Paredes, Portugal

Sport
- Sport: Fencing

Luís Silva (born 3 May 1972) is a Portuguese fencer. He competed in the individual sabre event at the 1992 Summer Olympics when he was only 20.
