= Marek Gniewkowski =

Polish fencer

Personal information
- Born: 30 June 1965 (age 61) Warsaw, Poland

Sport
- Sport: Fencing

Marek Gniewkowski (born 30 June 1965) is a Polish fencer. He competed in the sabre events at the 1988 and 1992 Summer Olympics.
