= Csaba Köves =

Hungarian fencer (1966–2025)

Personal information
- Born: 27 October 1966 Budapest, Hungary
- Died: 10 October 2025 (aged 58) Pest County, Hungary
- Height: 183 cm (72 in)
- Weight: 82 kg (181 lb)

Sport
- Sport: Fencing
- Club: Újpesti TE
Medal record
Men's fencing
Representing Hungary
Olympic Games
| Silver medal – second place | 1992 Barcelona | Team sabre |
| Silver medal – second place | 1996 Atlanta | Team sabre |
World Championships
| Gold medal – first place | 1991 Budapest | Team sabre |
| Gold medal – first place | 1993 Essen | Team sabre |
| Silver medal – second place | 1990 Lyon | Team sabre |
| Silver medal – second place | 1994 Athens | Team sabre |
| Bronze medal – third place | 1995 The Hague | Team sabre |
| Bronze medal – third place | 1997 Cape Town | Team sabre |
Summer Universiade
| Silver medal – second place | 1991 Sheffield | Individual sabre |
| Bronze medal – third place | 1993 Buffalo | Team sabre |

Csaba Köves (27 October 1966 – 10 October 2025) was a Hungarian fencer who won two Olympic silver medals in the team sabre competition.

Köves died on 10 October 2025, at the age of 58.
