= Frank Bleckmann =

German fencer

Personal information
- Born: 3 August 1967 (age 58) Mülheim an der Ruhr, West Germany

Sport
- Sport: Fencing

Frank Bleckmann (born 3 August 1967) is a German former fencer. He competed in the individual and team sabre events at the 1996 Summer Olympics.
