= Aleksandr Shirshov =

Russian fencer (born 1972)

Personal information
- Full name: Aleksandr Sergeyevich Shirshov
- Born: Александр Сергеевич Ширшов; 25 August 1972 (age 53) Moscow, Soviet Union
- Height: 1.82 m (6 ft 0 in)

Fencing career
- Sport: Fencing
- Weapon: Sabre
- Hand: right-handed
- Club: CSKA Moscow
Medal record
Men's sabre fencing
Representing Unified Team
Olympic Games
Gold medal – first place	1992 Barcelona	Team sabre

Aleksandr Shirshov (Russian: Александр Сергеевич Ширшов; born 25 August 1972) is a Russian former sabre fencer. He was born in Moscow, and was a member of CSKA Moscow. He won a gold medal in the team sabre event at the 1992 Summer Olympics as part of the Unified Team, and came in 13th in the individual sabre. He is now a fencing coach. 2013 world team champion Kamil Ibragimov and four-time junior world champion Konstantin Lokhanov have been his pupils. He is married to two-time Olympic team épée champion Oksana Yermakova.
