= Jean-Philippe Daurelle =

French fencer (born 1963)

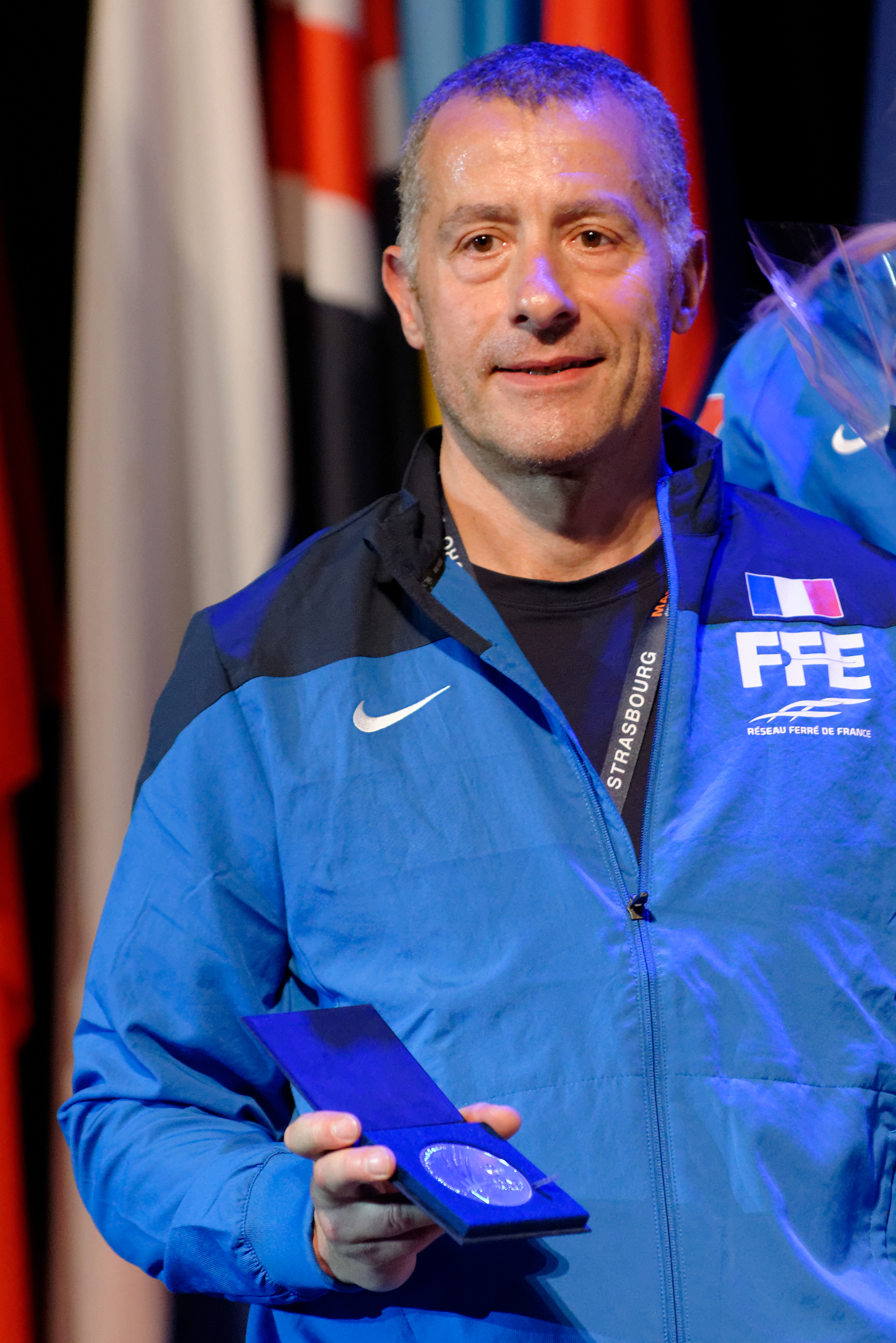

Personal information
- Born: 28 December 1963 (age 62) Antony, Hauts-de-Seine, France

Fencing career
- Sport: Fencing
- Weapon: Sabre
- Hand: right-handed
- Club: US Métro
Medal record
Men's Sabre
Representing France
Olympic Games
Bronze medal – third place	1992 Barcelona	Sabre, team

Jean-Philippe Daurelle (born 28 December 1963) is a French fencer. He won a bronze medal in the team sabre event at the 1992 Summer Olympics.

After he retired as an athlete he became a coach. He now trains the women's sabre French national team. Under his coaching, France won the silver medal in the 2014 European Fencing Championships and in the 2014 World Fencing Championships.
