= Elisa Uga =

Italian fencer (born 1968)

Personal information
- Born: 27 February 1968 (age 58) Vercelli, Italy

Sport
- Sport: Fencing
- Club: Fiamme Oro
Medal record
Women's fencing
Representing Italy
Olympic Games
| Silver medal – second place | 1996 Atlanta | Épée, team |

Elisa Uga (born 27 February 1968) is an Italian former fencer. She won a silver medal in the women's team épée event at the 1996 Summer Olympics.
