= Robert Kościelniakowski =

Polish fencer

Personal information
- Born: 3 May 1964 (age 62) Warsaw, Poland

Sport
- Sport: Fencing

Robert Kościelniakowski (born 3 May 1964) is a Polish fencer. He competed in the individual and team sabre events at the 1988 and 1992 Summer Olympics.
