= Jia Guihua =

Chinese fencer (born 1964)

Personal information
- Born: 31 January 1964 (age 62)

Sport
- Sport: Fencing

Jia Guihua (born 31 January 1964) is a Chinese fencer. He competed in the individual and team sabre events at the 1988 and 1992 Summer Olympics.
