= Zheng Zhaokang =

Chinese fencer

Personal information
- Born: 17 July 1964 (age 61)

Sport
- Sport: Fencing

Zheng Zhaokang (born 17 July 1964) is a Chinese fencer. He competed in the individual and team sabre events at the 1988 and 1992 Summer Olympics.
