= Bob Cottingham =

American fencer

Personal information
- Born: April 16, 1966 (age 60) Orange, New Jersey, United States

Sport
- Sport: Fencing

Bob Cottingham (born April 16, 1966) is an American fencer who competed in the sabre events at the 1988 and 1992 Summer Olympics.

== Biography ==
Raised in Orange, New Jersey playing football and lacrosse, Cottingham got into fencing as a high school student at Montclair Kimberley Academy.

He fenced for the Columbia Lions fencing team. A four-time All-American in fencing at Columbia University, Cottingham went on to receive a J.D. from Rutgers University and now heads a business consulting firm, Sabre88.

He is also heavily involved with the Peter Westbrook Foundation, a nonprofit devoted to exposing New York City youths to fencing.

In November 2012, he was named as a 2013 recipient of the NCAA Silver Anniversary Award, presented each year to six distinguished former student-athletes on the 25th anniversary of the end of their college sports careers.

== See also ==
- List of USFA Division I National Champions
