= Alexandru Chiculiță =

Romanian fencer (born 1961)

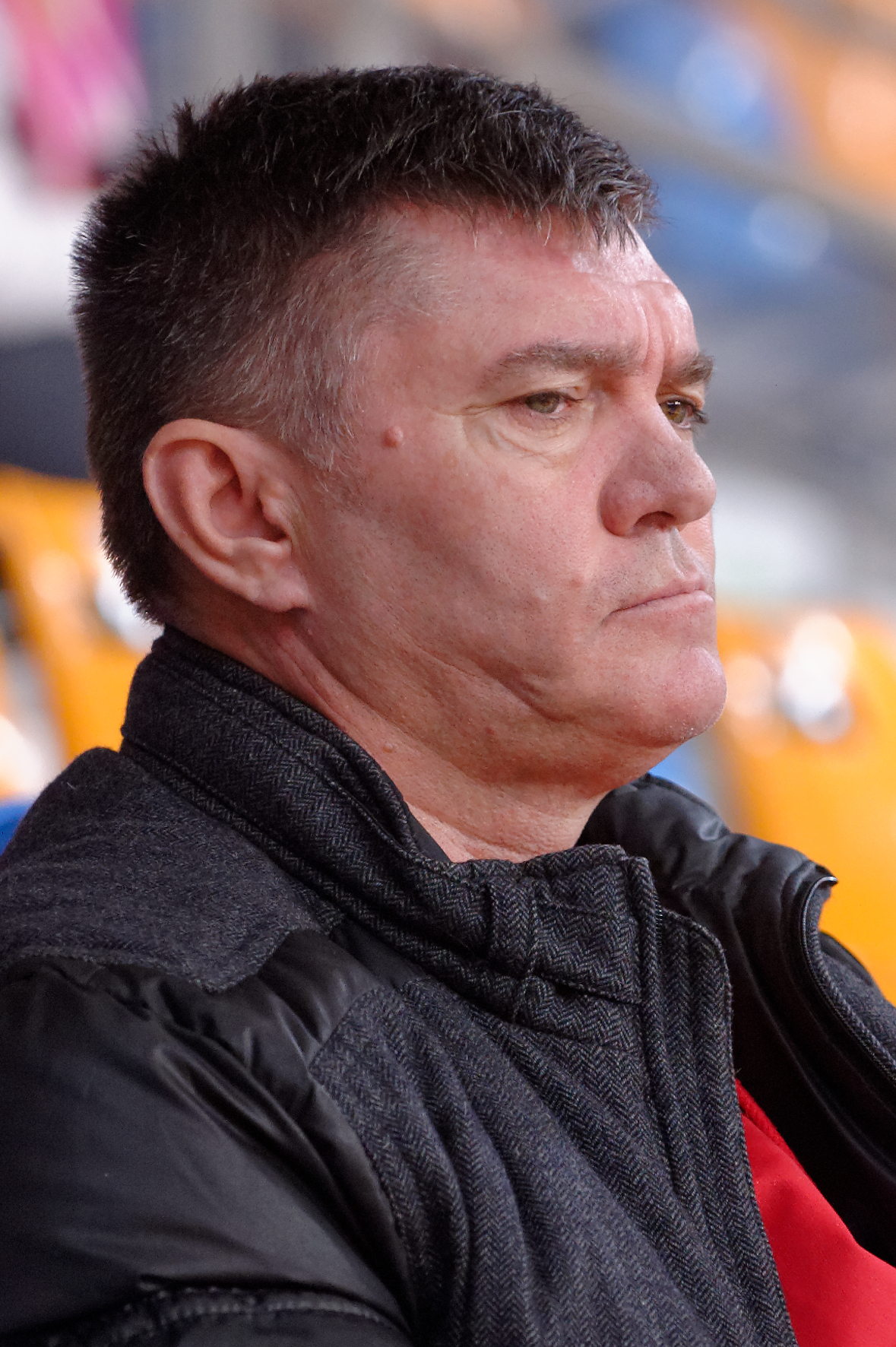
- Chiculiță in 2014

Personal information
- Born: 3 February 1961 (age 65) Bucharest, Romania
- Height: 1.80 m (5 ft 11 in)
- Weight: 73 kg (161 lb)

Sport
- Sport: Fencing
- Event: Sabre
- Club: Progresul București; CSA Steaua București
Medal record
Representing Romania
Olympic Games
Bronze medal – third place	1984 Los Angeles	Team sabre

Alexandru Chiculiță (born 3 February 1961) is a retired Romanian sabre fencer. He competed at the 1984 and 1992 Olympics and won a team bronze medal in 1984. After retiring from competitions he worked as a fencing coach, and currently trains the sabre team of CS Dinamo București.

== Career ==
Chiculiță started fencing at age ten at CS Progresul Bucharest. In 1981, he won a team bronze medal at the 1981 Summer Universiade held in his home town. The same year, he transferred to CSA Steaua. At the 1984 Summer Olympics, he competed only in the team event. Romania was defeated by France in the final and met West Germany in the match for the third place. Chiculiță entered the last leg with 7 all and defeated Freddy Scholz 5–1 to give Romania the bronze medal. Chiculiță was also part of the Romania team which competed in the 1992 Summer Olympics. They were again defeated in the semi-final, and were stopped by France in the match for the third place. Chiculiță also placed fourth with Romania in the 1993 World Fencing Championships, after a defeat against Germany in the match for the third place.

In 1996 Chiculiță retired as an athlete and became a coach at BNR Bucharest, where he trained future Olympic champion Mihai Covaliu. When BNR closed in 2002, he transferred with his star student to the newly reopened fencing section of CS Dinamo București, of which he is still a member as of 2014. He also coached the men's national sabre team, before leaving this responsibility on Covaliu and taking charge of the women's national sabre team. Under his coaching, Bianca Pascu qualified for the 2012 Summer Olympics.
