= Kirk Zavieh =

British fencer

Personal information
- Born: 1 April 1968 (age 58) Port of Spain, Trinidad and Tobago

Sport
- Sport: Fencing

Kirk Zavieh (born 1 April 1968) is a British fencer. He competed in the individual and team sabre events at the 1992 Summer Olympics.

He is also the composer, alongside Charles Hodgkinson, of the Sky News music theme, performed by the Royal Philharmonic Orchestra.
