= Antonio García (fencer) =

Spanish fencer (born 1964)

Personal information
- Born: 29 July 1964 (age 61) Madrid, Spain

Sport
- Sport: Fencing
Medal record
Mediterranean Games
Bronze medal – third place	1991 Athens	Individual sabre

Antonio García (born 29 July 1964) is a Spanish fencer. He competed in the sabre events at five consecutive Olympic Games between 1984 and 2000. He won a bronze medal in the individual sabre event at the 1991 Mediterranean Games.

== See also ==
- List of athletes with the most appearances at Olympic Games
