= Bence Szabó (fencer) =

Hungarian fencer (born 1962)

Personal information
- Born: 13 June 1962 (age 64) Budapest, Hungary
- Height: 1.88 m (6 ft 2 in)
- Weight: 85 kg (187 lb)

Fencing career
- Sport: Fencing
- Weapon: Sabre
- Hand: right-handed
- Club: Újpesti TE (1974-1996)
- Head coach: Jakab László, Csaba Zarándi
Medal record
Olympic Games
| Gold medal – first place | 1988 Seoul | Team sabre |
| Gold medal – first place | 1992 Barcelona | Individual sabre |
| Silver medal – second place | 1992 Barcelona | Team sabre |
| Silver medal – second place | 1996 Atlanta | Team sabre |
World Championships
| Gold medal – first place | 1991 Budapest | Team sabre |
| Gold medal – first place | 1993 Essen | Team sabre |
| Silver medal – second place | 1990 Lyon | Team sabre |
| Silver medal – second place | 1993 Essen | Individual sabre |
| Silver medal – second place | 1994 Athens | Team sabre |
| Bronze medal – third place | 1994 Athens | Individual sabre |
| Bronze medal – third place | 1995 The Hague | Team sabre |
Summer Universiade
| Gold medal – first place | 1987 Zagreb | Individual sabre |
| Gold medal – first place | 1987 Zagreb | Team sabre |
| Gold medal – first place | 1989 Duisburg | Individual sabre |
| Silver medal – second place | 1989 Duisburg | Team sabre |
| Bronze medal – third place | 1983 Edmonton | Team sabre |

Bence Szabó (born 13 June 1962) is a Hungarian sabre fencer, who has won four Olympic medals in the sabre competitions.

== Awards ==
- Hungarian fencer of the Year (4): 1989, 1992, 1993, 1994
- Honorary Citizen of Újpest (2014)
- Member of International Fencing Federation (FIE) Hall of Fame (2016)

Orders and special awards

- Golden ring of the Interior minister (1988)
- Hungarian People's Republic – Order of Stars (1988)
- Order of Merit of the Republic of Hungary – Officer's Cross (1992)
- Order of Merit of the Republic of Hungary – Commander's Cross (1996)
