= Gary Fletcher (fencer) =

British fencer

Personal information
- Born: 12 February 1962 (age 64) Ashton-under-Lyne, Cheshire, England

Sport
- Sport: Fencing

Gary Fletcher (born 12 February 1962) is a British fencer. He competed in the individual and team sabre events at the 1992 Summer Olympics. In 1990, he won the sabre title at the British Fencing Championships.
