= Raúl Peinador =

Spanish fencer

Personal information
- Born: 14 August 1968 (age 57) Madrid, Spain

Sport
- Sport: Fencing
Medal record
Mediterranean Games
Silver medal – second place	1991 Athens	Individual sabre

Raúl Peinador (born 14 August 1968) is a Spanish fencer. He competed in the individual and team sabre events at the 1992 and 1996 Summer Olympics. He won a silver medal in the individual sabre event at the 1991 Mediterranean Games.
