= Jürgen Nolte =

German fencer

Personal information
- Born: 19 November 1959 (age 66) Bonn, West Germany

Sport
- Sport: Fencing

Jürgen Nolte (born 19 November 1959) is a German fencer. He competed in the individual and team sabre events for West Germany at the 1984 Olympic games in Los Angeles, 1988 Summer Olympics in Seoul, and for Germany at the 1992 Summer Olympics in Barcelona.
