= Imre Bujdosó =

Hungarian fencer (born 1959)

Personal information
- Nickname: Bujdi
- Born: 12 February 1959 (age 67) Berettyóújfalu, Hungary

Fencing career
- Sport: Fencing
- Weapon: Sabre
- Hand: right-handed
- Club: Vasas SC (1987-1994); Budapest SE (1973-1987)
Medal record
Olympic Games
Gold medal – first place	1988 Seoul	Sabre Team
Silver medal – second place	1992 Barcelona	Sabre Team

Imre Bujdosó (born 12 February 1959, in Berettyóújfalu, Hajdú-Bihar County) is a Hungarian fencer, who has won two Olympic medals in the team sabre competition.
