= Felix Becker (fencer) =

German fencer (1964)

Personal information
- Born: 9 August 1964 (age 62) Darmstadt, West Germany

Sport
- Sport: Fencing

Felix Becker (born 9 August 1964) is a German fencer. He competed in the individual and team sabre events at the 1988, 1992 and 1996 Summer Olympics.

In 1994, he won the Fencing World Championships in Individual Men's Sabre.
