= Serhiy Mishchenko =

Ukrainian businessman and politician

Serhiy Oleksandrovych Mishchenko
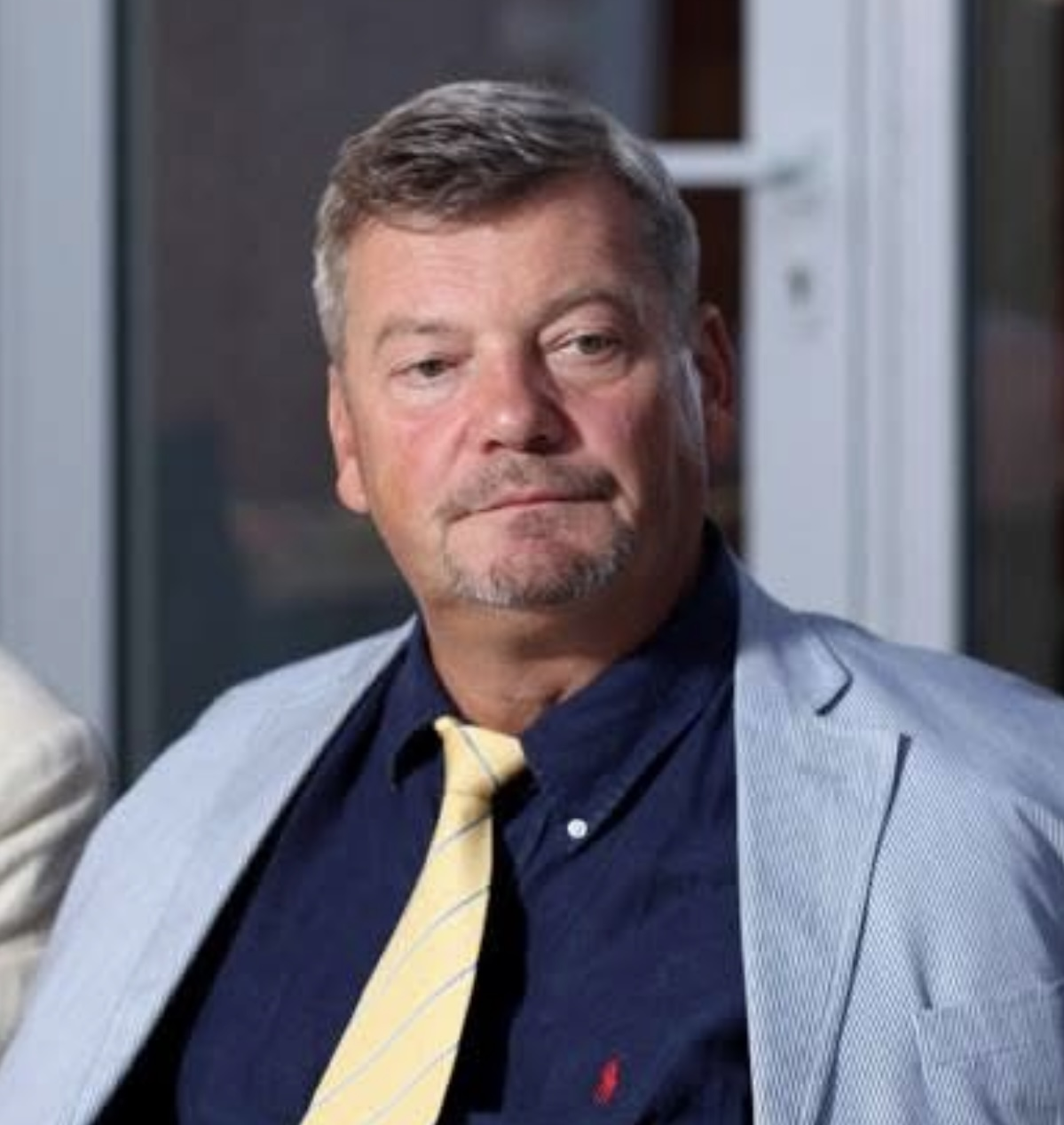

President of the Ukrainian Fencing Federation
- In office 1993–2012
- Succeeded by: Vadym Gutzeit

Personal details
- Born: 21 May 1956 (age 70) Mizoch, Ukrainian SSR, Soviet Union
- Education: Taras Shevchenko National University of Kyiv
- Occupation: Businessman
- Awards: Hero of Sports Year

Serhiy Oleksandrovych Mishchenko — is a Ukrainian businessman and a former president of the Ukrainian Fencing Federation (1993 — 2012).

Mishchenko also has a PhD in economics, and is an author of 20 publications on international statistics, world trade, development of scientific and technical potential.

== Biography ==
In 1978, he graduated with honors from the Faculty of International Economic Relations of Taras Shevchenko National University of Kyiv.

In 1987 he defended his PhD thesis on the topic: "Statistics of world trade in agricultural and food products".

In 1978-1980 worked as a translator in the staff of the counselor of the USSR Embassy in the People's Democratic Republic of Yemen.

From 1980 until 1982 — economist at the Institute of Socio-Economic Problems of Foreign Countries of the National Academy of Sciences of Ukraine.

During 1986-1990 held the positions of a researcher, a senior researcher at the Center for Scientific and Technical Potential Research of the National Academy of Sciences of Ukraine.

Since 1991, Mishchenko is the head of ILTA LLC. Today ILTA LLC is the official dealer of Peugeot, Citroen, DS and Jeep in Ukraine. ILTA is also the official sponsor of the Ukrainian Fencing Federation.

From 2002 until its liquidation, Mishchenko was the chairman of the supervisory board of the investment company IIT Invest. Shareholders of the ITT Group founded the Akordbank in 2009.

== Sport management ==
Mishchenko was the president (1993–2012), vice-president (from 2012 to the present) of the Ukrainian Fencing Federation.

He was also the Deputy head of the organisational committee for the preparation and holding of the 2008 European Fencing Championship in Kyiv.

He is also an Honorary member of the National Olympic Committee of Ukraine.

== Awards and recognition ==
He won the “Hero of Sports Year” award three times: in 2008, 2009 and 2010 for "Dedication to Sports" and for being "The best sports organizer of the year".
