= Matvii Bidnyi =

Ukrainian politician (born 1979)

- Матвій Бідний
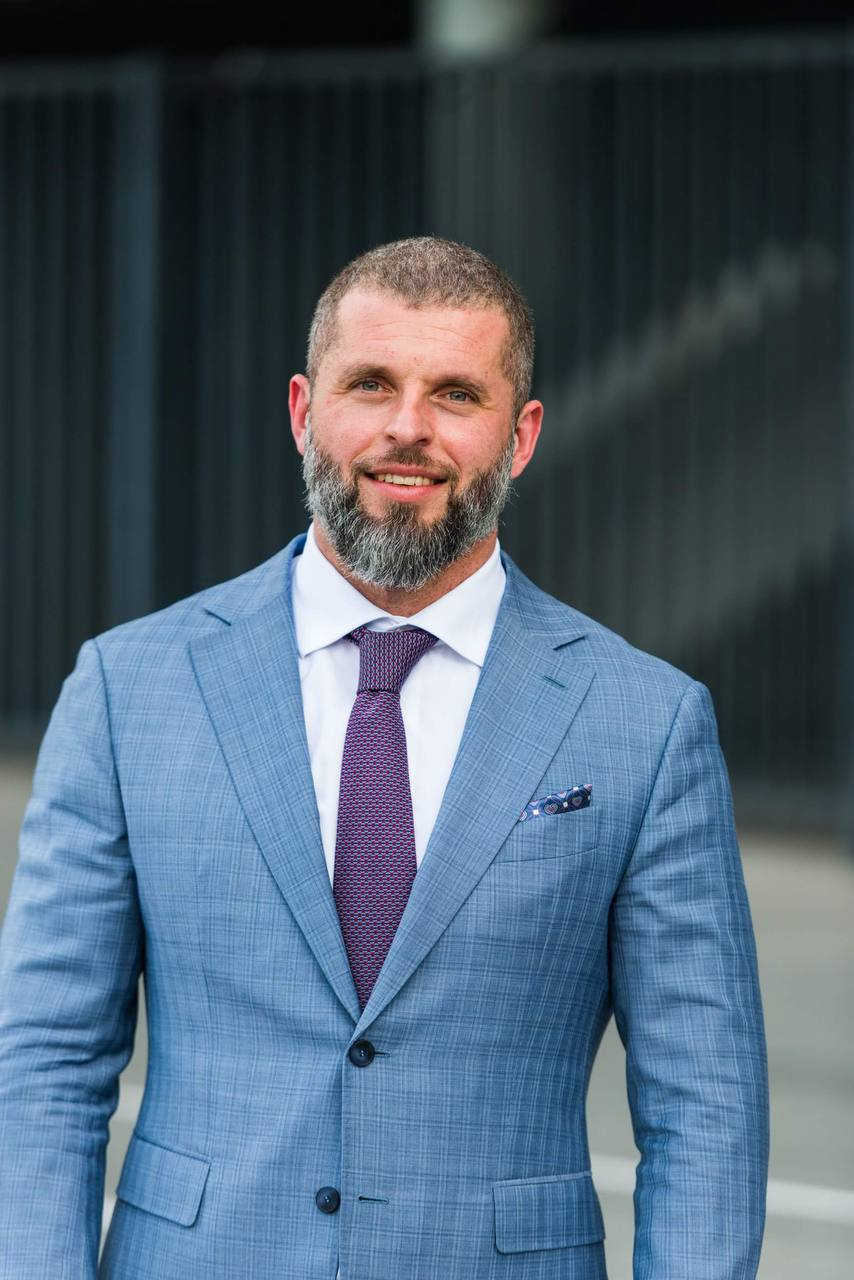
- Bidnyi in 2023

Minister of Youth and Sports
- Incumbent
- Assumed office 9 November 2023
- President: Volodymyr Zelenskyy
- Prime Minister: Denys Shmyhal; Yulia Svyrydenko; Serhii Koretskyi
- Preceded by: Vadym Gutzeit

Personal details
- Born: 28 November 1979 (age 46) Kyiv, Ukrainian SSR, Soviet Union (now Ukraine)

Matvii Viktorovych Bidnyi (Ukrainian: Матвій Вікторович Бідний; born 28 November 1979) is a Ukrainian politician, sports administrator, and former professional bodybuilder. He has served as the Minister of Youth and Sports of Ukraine since 5 September 2024, after holding the position in an acting capacity from 9 November 2023 to 5 September 2024. He is also a three-time Ukrainian bodybuilding champion.

== Education ==
Matvii Bidnyi, holds four higher education degrees. He earned degrees as a Coach-Teacher in Physical Education and Sport from the National University of Physical Education and Sport of Ukraine (2001), in Finance from the Kyiv National University of Trade and Economics (2004), in Commercial and Labour Law from the Interregional Academy of Personnel Management (2008), and in Public Management and Administration from the National Academy of Public Administration under the President of Ukraine (2020).

== Political and Professional Career ==
In 2016, Bidnyi served as Chief Specialist in the Division of Priority Non-Olympic Sports within the Department of Physical Culture and Non-Olympic Sports at the Ministry of Youth and Sports of Ukraine.

From 2016 to 2020, he was appointed Director of the Department of Physical Culture and Non-Olympic Sports at the Ministry.

On 15 July 2020, he was appointed Deputy Minister of Youth and Sports of Ukraine.

On 9 November 2023, the Cabinet of Ministers of Ukraine appointed Bidnyi as Acting Minister of Youth and Sports, following the dismissal of Vadym Huttsait.

On 5 September 2024, Bidnyi was officially confirmed as Minister of Youth and Sports, receiving support from 239 Members of the Verkhovna Rada.

Matvii Bidnyi, spearheaded the "Volia Space" initiative (Ukraine House) during the 2024 Paris Olympic Games. Hosted at La Villette Park from July 27 to August 10, 2024, this 15-day project, meaning "Will to Win space", aimed to showcase Ukraine's strength and spirit during challenging times.

Its mission was to demonstrate Ukraine's unwavering will to win, both in sports and in its defense against the Russian invasion, thereby protecting Olympic values and affirming its status as a reliable democratic partner. The venue featured multimedia presentations, cultural exhibitions, and high-profile discussions.

Notable guests included Ukrainian National Olympic Committee President Vadym Gutsait, Ballon d'Or winner Andriy Shevchenko, boxing champion Oleksandr Usyk, Oscar-winning director Mstislav Chernov, singer Jamala, and International Athletics Federation President Sebastien Coe, alongside most Ukrainian medalists from Paris 2024. Beyond sports, Volia Space also promoted Ukraine's rich cultural heritage and its ongoing fight for freedom, featuring high-end installations and areas for media events.

On 9 October 2024, the Committee of Ministers of the Council of Europe approved Bidnyi as the European representative to the Executive Board of the World Anti-Doping Agency (WADA) for the 2025–2027 term.

== Sports achievements ==
From 1999 to 2004, he was a member of the National Bodybuilding Team of Ukraine. Champion of Ukraine 2000, 2001, 2002. Silver medalist of the World Junior Championship 2000, Dubai , UAE.

== Awards and Honours ==
- Letter of Gratitude, Ministry of Youth and Sports of Ukraine (31 August 2017)
- Letter of Gratitude, National Olympic Committee of Ukraine — for contributions to the development of the Olympic movement
- Honorary Diploma, Cabinet of Ministers of Ukraine (1 December 2017)
- Honorary Diploma, Ministry of Youth and Sports of Ukraine (1 August 2019)
- Honored Worker of Physical Culture and Sports of Ukraine (13 September 2019) — for significant contributions to the development and promotion of physical culture and sports, outstanding sports achievements, and long-standing professional service
- “Badge of Honor” Breast Badge, Ministry of Youth and Sports of Ukraine (23 December 2021)
