= Automaidan =

Ukrainian socio-political movement

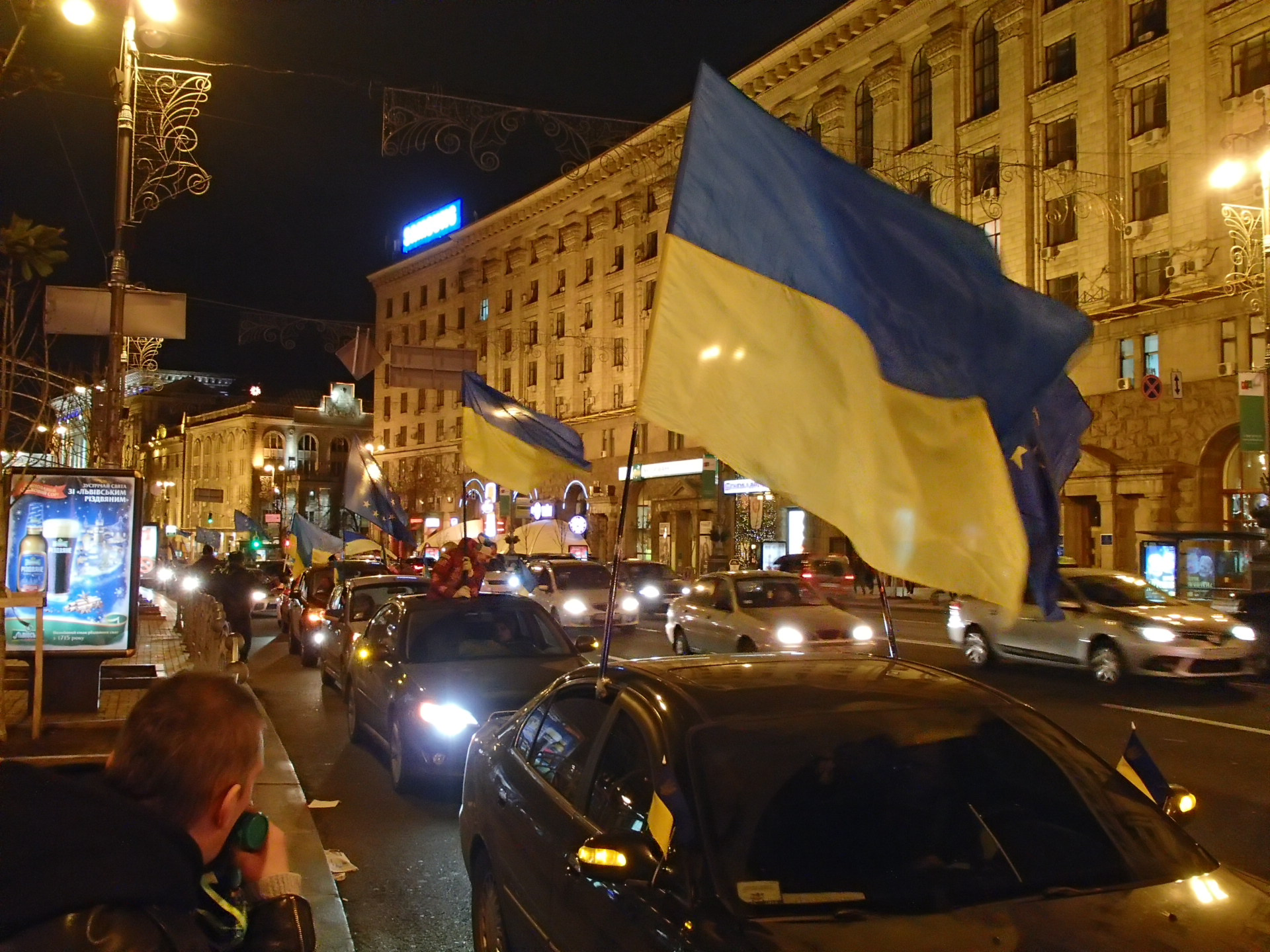
Automaidan Movement, 2013

Automaidan (Ukrainian: Автомайдaн, romanized: Avtomaidan) is a pro-European Ukrainian socio-political movement involving the use of cars and trucks as means of protest that first began in late 2013 in Kyiv within the advent of Euromaidan.

== History ==
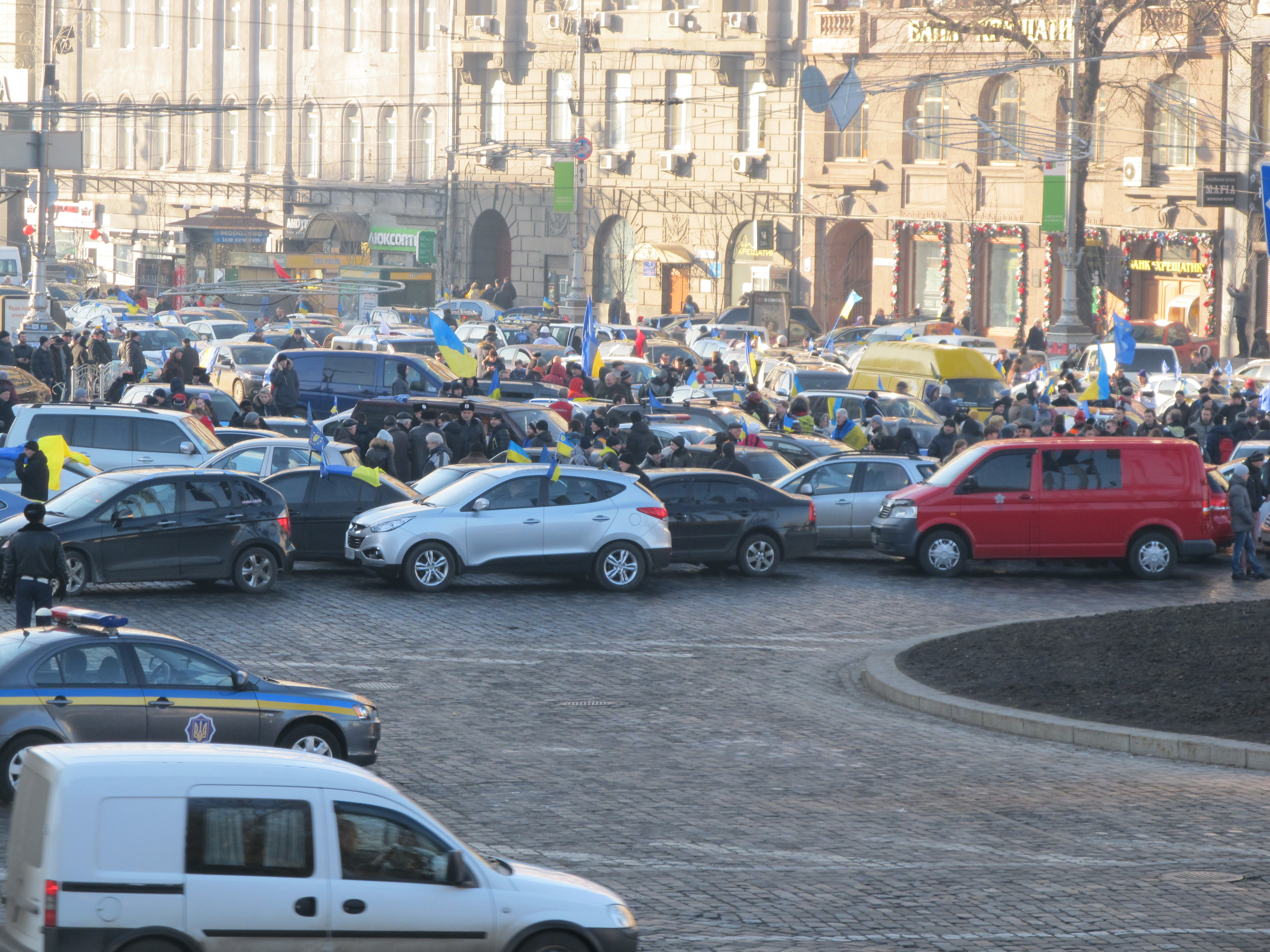
Automaidan in Kyiv

The initial goals of Automaidan included the resignation of the Ukrainian president Viktor Yanukovych, as well as Ukraine's alignment with the EU.The movement consisted of drivers who protected the protest, supply revolutionary camps, disobey the Azarov, block streets and bring the Euromaidan to "the ruling elite's" doorsteps.

The movement originated on 30 November 2013. In the early morning hours, after the dispersion of protesters on Independence Square in Kyiv, car owners started driving around the city with the specific purpose of signaling and displaying Ukrainian and European flags to agitate for massive protests against the oppressive-turned-violent government. Drivers brought hundreds of people to St. Michaels Square for free from across the city and suburbs.

Automaidan organized numerous car processions to residencies of anti-Ukrainian officials including the one on 29 December 2013, to the president's residence in Mezhyhirya to voice their protests at his refusal to sign the Ukraine–European Union Association Agreement in December 2013. The motorcade was stopped a couple of hundred metres short of his residence. This resulted in Automaidan members being identified and becoming a major target of violent attacks by government forces, militia, and titushkys.

One of the organisers, Dmytro Bulatov, was kidnapped by unknown assailants on 22 January 2014. He reappeared on 30 January, having been tortured and visibly injured. On 6 February 2014, while undergoing treatment in Lithuania, he stated at a press conference in Vilnius that he was tortured to admit that his organization was funded and aided by Americans and the U.S. ambassador to Ukraine especially and that he was hired to organize the Automaidan and the riots against the (then) current government.

During the press conference Bulatov repeatedly stressed that he believed he was abducted by the Russian special forces and that the leader of the Ukrainian Choice Viktor Medvedchuk might have been involved in his abduction. The kidnapping of Bulatov condemned by many, including the High Representative of the Union for Foreign Affairs and Security Policy, Catherine Ashton.

In a statement from her office on 31 January, she said "I am appalled by the obvious signs of prolonged torture and cruel treatment of Auto-Maidan organiser Dmytro Bulatov, who was found alive yesterday after having been missing for a week. [...] All such acts are unacceptable and must immediately be stopped. It is the authorities' responsibility to take all necessary measures to address the current atmosphere of intimidation and impunity which allows for such acts to take place. All unlawfully detained people have to be released and perpetrators brought to justice." Two criminal cases involving Bulatov have been opened, one treats him as a victim of abduction, another as a suspect in criminal proceedings on mass riots.

=== Hrushevskoho Street riots ===
On 19 January 2014 at about 14:00 during a viche (veche: public meeting), one of the members of Automaidan Sergey Coba, who demanded that the leaders of the three opposition parties represented in parliament choose one of them as the resistance leader, was widely supported by the gathered people. If his demand was not met within half an hour Mr. Coba promised that Automaidan would go to the parliament building and peacefully picket it until parliamentary deputies cancel the "dictatorship laws".

The demand was not met and Automaidan, Self-defence and thousands of viche supporters went to the parliament building via Hrushevskoho Street. The street was blocked by riot police and internal troops and before 15:40 when aggressive actions began.

The same day at 16:00 Dmitry Bulatov posted a disclaimer on his Facebook page, saying that he, Serhij Poyarkov and Andrej Telizhenko were against unmotivated use of force, bloodshed, hadn't called on people to go to the parliament building and were trying to persuade Automaidan activists and other people to resist authority's provocations.

=== Since end of Euromaidan ===
In February 2014 Automaidan leader Dmytro Bulatov was appointed Minister for Youth and Sports in the first Yatsenyuk Government. the 2 December 2014 appointed second Yatsenyuk Government he did not return.

In Odesa on 30 August 2015 Automaidan activists briefly occupied the estate of former MP Serhiy Kivalov to expose his wealth.

On 31 October 2015 100 AutoMaidan vehicles protested at the mansion of president Petro Poroshenko demanding the resignation of Prosecutor General Viktor Shokin. They accused Shokin of sabotaging corruption and the deaths of Euromaidan demonstrators investigations.

Mid-February 2016 Automaidan activists from Zhytomyr blocked the passage of trucks with Russian registration plates at the Belarusian-Ukrainian border.

== Regional and other organizations ==
The idea of a motorized socio-political protest force was widely accepted and reproduced in numerous regional organizations in Ukraine as well as abroad. Especially in Kyiv, the movement has become a spring board for many public initiatives, individual personalities and organizations.

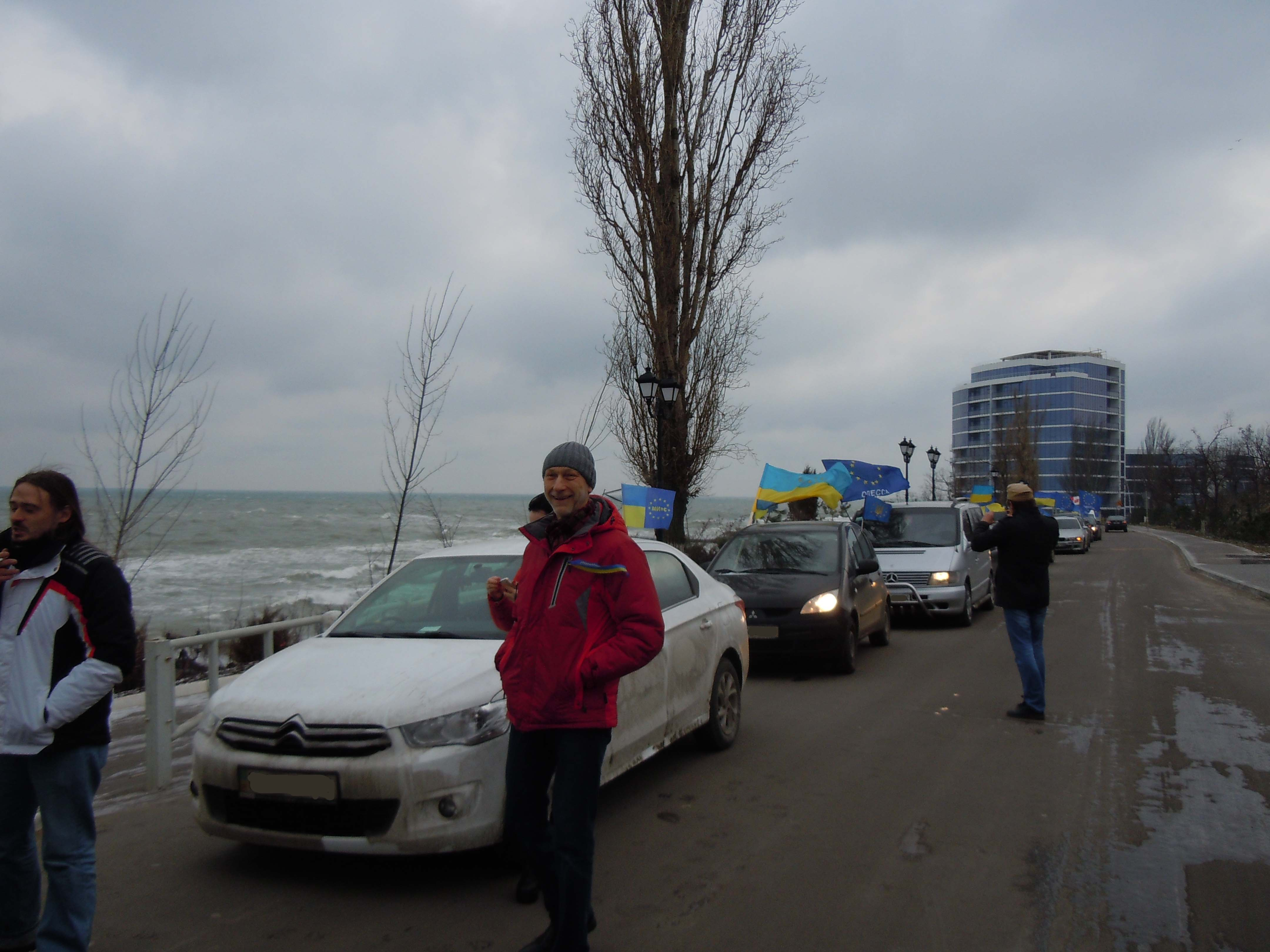
An Automaidan procession in Odesa on 25 January 2014

Several Automaidan members have been expelled from the organisation due to "their involvement in paid-for (rallies) activities in the past". The organisations has complained that there have been rallies that were claimed to be Automaidan rallies but were not supported by Automaidan.

== Separation of Autodozor ==
After the violent dispersion of Automaidan in Cherkasy on 27 February 2014 many of their activists separated into a new group called Autodozor (Ukrainian: Автодозор, literally "Car-watch"). They announced two reasons for that – unwillingness to supply the personal data that Automaidan office body wanted and the appearance of people involved in financial frauds among self-proclaimed leaders of Automaidan.

As of 27 February 2014 Autodozor consisted of more than 200 cars. Their motto is "less words more action". Their main activities are:

- delivery of tyres (for burning); gasoline, oil, bottles (for Molotov cocktails);
- transporting of injured;
- patrolling of Kyiv streets (after the change of government they do this together with road police);
- transporting of perished to their homes outside Kyiv.

They claim that most of what was done within those activities throughout the revolution was done mostly by the current activists of Autodozor while they were still activists of Automaidan.
