= Dmytro Bulatov =

Ukrainian civic activist

- Дмитро Булатов
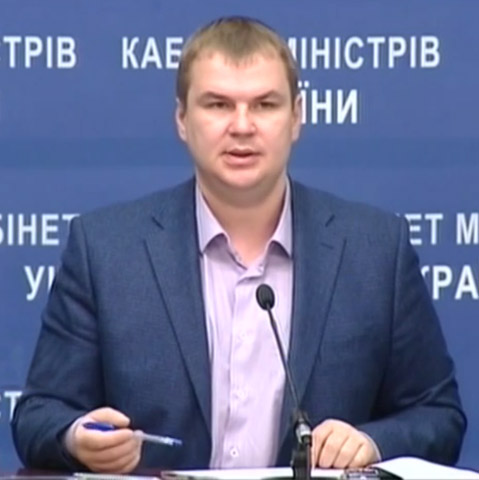
- Bulatov in 2014

2nd Minister of Youth and Sports of Ukraine
- In office 27 February 2014 – 2 December 2014
- Prime Minister: Arseniy Yatsenyuk
- Preceded by: Ravil Safiullin
- Succeeded by: Ihor Zhdanov

Personal details
- Born: Dmytro Serhiyovych Bulatov; Дмитро Сергійович Булатов; August 13, 1978 (age 48) Kyiv, Ukrainian SSR
- Education: Kyiv Polytechnic Institute
- Occupation: Civic activist, leader of the AutoMaidan
- Known for: Being tortured due to his civil position in favour of Euromaidan

Dmytro Serhiyovych Bulatov (Ukrainian: Дмитро Сергійович Булатов; born August 13, 1978) is a Ukrainian civic activist who was the Minister of Youth and Sports during the first Yatsenyuk Government in 2014.

Bulatov was the leader of the AutoMaidan, which was the mobile car-based arm of the anti-government Euromaidan movement. He was also in charge of the "Socially Responsible Society" NGO. Due to his activism, he was supposedly kidnapped and tortured outside the villas of the Ukrainian government and business figures.

== Biography ==
Bulatov is a graduate of the Kyiv Polytechnic Institute. In 2001, he graduated from the Electronics Department with a degree in Engineering of Microelectronics and Semiconductor Devices.

Between 1998 and 2014, Bulatov had his own business and held key positions in state and private companies. He worked as the Director of the Tsentr-K Private Enterprise (1998–2003), as the Chief of Q-Service Group of Companies (2003–2007, marketing, advertisement and design), as the deputy director of ITERA Group of Companies (2007–2008, building activity), the Director of “Promlohistyka” LLC (2008–2009, metallurgy), and as the Director of “Torhovo-Promyslovyi Holding” LLC (2009–2010, oil and gas trade). In conjunction with this, he held consulting activities in the areas of marketing, advertisement and sales. Between 2010 and 2013, he was the owner of Stolnik Autocenter, but after certain events, the business vector was changed and Bulatov began to work mainly in consulting.

Between May and October 2010, he worked as the Director of the “Ukrrybproekt” Designing Institute for Fisheries and Fishery Industry and in the State Committee of Fishing of Ukraine under the Ministry of Agrarian Policy of Ukraine. During this half of the year, he turned the institute from a losing organisation to a profitable one.

At the beginning of 2013, he created the "Socially Responsible Society" NGO. Together with the Ukrainian Philanthropists Forum, this organisation began the National Philanthropists Top List. In April 2013, Bulatov organised the dismantling of alcohol sale points in Muromets Park. In September 2013, he agitated for the prohibition of alcohol festivals at playgrounds. After his 12-year-old son got stuck in an open drain while riding a bicycle, he and the members of his organisation took to the streets to cover up open drains in the city of Kyiv.

Bulatov is married and has three children. He was active in wakeboarding and took part in national competitions.

=== AutoMaidan ===
On November 30, 2013, Bulatov found out about the forceful dispersal of Euromaidan and, together with his friend Oleksii Hrytsenko, decided to organise a car run across Kyiv in order to involve people in the protest. On the first day, about 300 drivers partook in the action. On the morning of December 1, Bulatov gathered with other participants (most notably Vasyl Futin, Tetiana Chornovol, Andrii Dzidzia, Volodymyr Kadura, and others) to delegate responsibility. This was the beginning of AutoMaidan.

Bulatov was the organizer and took part in most of AutoMaidan's actions, particularly in a drive to Mezhyhiria, in visits to other high-ranking person and troop leader of “Berkut”, and also in blocking of “Berkut” in Sviatoshynskyi District, Kyiv.

=== Kidnapping and torturing ===
On January 22, 2014, activists of AutoMaidan announced that Bulatov went missing. The last time Bulatov got in touch was the evening of January 22. On January 23, at approximate four o'clock in the morning, “Berkut” arrested a minimum of 15 activists of AutoMaidan who patrolled Hospital No. 17 in Kyiv and piled up nine cars. AutoMaidan announced a reward of ten thousand US dollars for information to help find Dmytro Bulatov and save his life. Subsequently, this amount was increased up to twenty-five thousand US dollars.

On January 30, Bulatov got in touch with friends and claimed he had been kidnapped, and tortured by captors who spoke with Russian accents. After these tortures, he was brought outside the city and thrown out of a car.

Bulatov managed to get to the village of Vyshenky, Boryspil district. and asked for help. The same day, Bulatov was admitted to the Boris Clinic, where he received first medical care. According to Petro Poroshenko, Dmytro Bulatov, Oleksandr Danyliuk, and Oleksii Hrytsenko (participant of AutoMaidan) were entered by the Ministry of Internal Affairs of Ukraine into the foreign travel ban list. This list was observed by the frontier guards. On February 2, Shevchenko District Court in the City of Kyiv rejected to uphold a motion of investigation to arrest Dmytro Bulatov. That same day, Bulatov went to Lithuania to be treated there in transit through Riga.

On 6 February 2014, while undergoing treatment in Lithuania, Bulatov stated at a press conference in Vilnius that he was tortured to admit that his organisation was funded and aided by Americans and the U.S. ambassador to Ukraine, especially, and that he was hired to organise the Automaidan and the riots against the current government. During the press conference, Bulatov repeatedly stressed that he believed he was abducted by the Russian special forces and that the leader of Ukrainian Choice, oligarch Viktor Medvedchuk, might have been involved in his abduction. After one session of torture, "they made me say into a camera that I was a spy for the United States, that I was a spy for the CIA, that Americans were giving me money, that Automaidan was funded by Americans, and that I was specifically hired to organise the Automaidan and the riots against the current government." Bulatov also said: "After this torture, I said to the camera everything they asked me to say, and they recorded it all on video. I said that the U.S. ambassador gave me $50,000, which I used to buy gasoline for the Automaidan, to repair cars for the Automaidan activists, for whom I had bought several video cameras to film trips. That is, I lied only to get them to torture me less."

The kidnapping of Bulatov was widely condemned, including by the High Representative of the Union for Foreign Affairs and Security Policy, Catherine Ashton.

Fresh from medical care in Lithuania, Bulatov went to Germany to visit his relatives. On 15 February 2014, he held a press conference at Checkpoint Charlie Museum in Berlin where he again accused Medvedchuk of his kidnapping, but said: “That’s only a suspicion.” He confirmed that he would re-join protests in Ukraine and would not seek asylum.

On February 24, Dmytro Bulatov returned to Ukraine.

In 2019, several of Bulatov's associates testified to the Ministry of Internal Affairs of Ukraine that Bulatov had staged his own kidnapping. The ministry closed their investigation of the kidnapping, saying that they had not found any evidence of criminal activity and that there was a real possibility that the kidnapping was staged.

=== Politics ===
In February 2014, Bulatov was appointed as the Minister of Youth and Sports in the first Yatsenyuk Government. He began reforms in the areas of sports and physical culture. However, in the second Yatsenyuk Government, he did not return. Bulatov also did not participate in the 2014 Ukrainian parliamentary election.

Six months before the end of his ministership, Bulatov was drafted into the Ukrainian army, where he fought in the War in Donbas until his draft period ended in July 2016.

In the summer of 2018, Bulatov was appointed Deputy Chairman of the State Reserve Agency. He was fired from this position in September 2019.

== See also ==
- List of kidnappings
- Lists of solved missing person cases

Political offices
Preceded by Ravil Safiullin	Minister of Youth and Sports; 2014	Succeeded by Ihor Zhdanov
