= Ivan Fedorenko =

- Іван Федоренко
- Born: Ivan Nykyforovych Fedorenko; August 18, 1944 (age 82); Rakivshchyna, Ovruch Raion, Zhytomyr Oblast
- Citizenship: (Soviet Union) → (Ukraine)
- Education: Kiev Highway Institute (1971); Higher Party School of CPU (1980)
- Occupation: sports functionary
- Years active: 1980–present
- Title: President of the NOC Ukraine
- Term: 1998 - 2002
- Predecessor: Valeriy Borzov
- Successor: Viktor Yanukovych
- Children: 2 daughters

Ivan Nykyforovych Fedorenko (18 August 1944) — Ukrainian sports functionary. The President of the NOC Ukraine in 1998–2002. Director of executive administration in conducting the Final stage of the Euro 2012, member of presidium of the Football Federation of Ukraine and its executive committee. Major General of the Armed Forces of Ukraine. Merited Worker of Physical Culture and Sports of Ukraine (1994).

== Biography ==
In 1971 Fedorenko graduated from the Kiev Highway Institute and received a diploma of engineer-mechanic. His education was interrupted by a three-year-long service in the Soviet Army.

Until 1979 he worked at leadership positions in Kiev corporation "Budmekhanizatsia" and in 1980 graduated from the Higher Party School.

In 1980-97 — deputy and later a chairman of the Central Council of the Dynamo Sports Society.

In 1997—2000 Fedorenko was heading the State Committee on issues of Physical Culture and Sports (later as State Committee on issues of Youth Policy, Sports, and Tourism).

During that period in December 1998 the 9th General Assembly of NOC Ukraine elected Ivan Fedorenko as the President of the National Olympic Committee of Ukraine. That position he held until 2002 and later was the vice-president.

In 1999 Fedorenko was awarded rank of Major General.

Married and has two daughters.

== State awards ==
- Order of Merit I degree (2006), II degree (2004), Honorary Decoration of the President of Ukraine (1996)
- Merited Worker of Physical Culture and Sports of Ukraine (1994)
- Among others are Order of the Badge of Honour, Jubilee Medal "Twenty Years of Victory in the Great Patriotic War 1941–1945", Medal "For Distinguished Labour", Medal "In Commemoration of the 1500th Anniversary of Kiev", Medal "Veteran of Labour", "For Flawless Service" ІІІ degree.

Government offices
Preceded by Valeriy Borzov	Chairman of the State Committee on Physical Culture and Sports; 1997–1999	Succeeded by Oleksandr Volkov
Preceded by Oleksandr Volkov	Chairman of the State Committee on Youth, Sports, and Tourism; 2000–2000	Succeeded by Maria Bulatova
Preceded by Valentyna Dovzhenko	Chairman of the State Committee on Youth, Sports, and Tourism; 2000–2000	Succeeded by Valeriy Tsybukh
Sporting positions
Preceded by Valeriy Borzov	President of Ukrainian NOC; 1998–2002	Succeeded by Viktor Yanukovych
