= Ihor Zhdanov =

Ukrainian politician

- Ігор Жданов
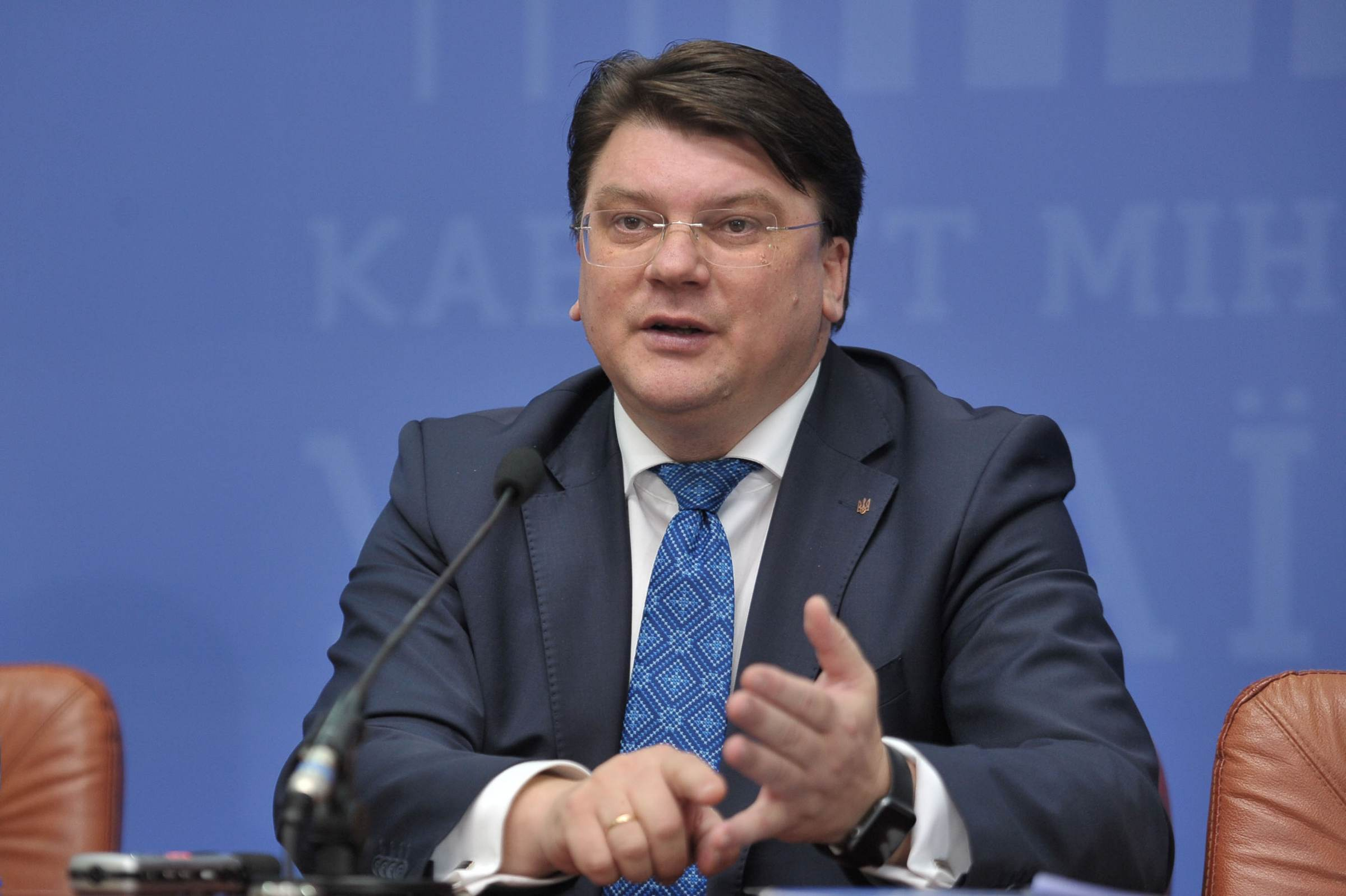
- Zhdanov in 2018

3rd Minister of Youth and Sports of Ukraine
- In office 2 December 2014 – 29 August 2019
- Prime Minister: Arseniy Yatsenyuk
- Preceded by: Dmytro Bulatov
- Succeeded by: Volodymyr Borodiansky

Personal details
- Born: Ігор Олександрович Жданов; 29 December 1967 (age 58) Vinnytsia, Ukrainian SSR
- Education: Kyiv University (1992) – History; Kyiv University (1994) – Justice; University of West London (1996)

Ihor Oleksandrovych Zhdanov (Ukrainian: Ігор Олександрович Жданов; 29 December 1967) is a Ukrainian politician who served as the Minister of Youth and Sports in both the Yatsenyuk Government and in the Groysman Government. Zhdanov is also the president of the Open Politics analytical center.

== Early life ==
Zhdanov was born on 29 December 1967 in the city of Vinnytsia, which was thehn part of the Ukrainian SSR in the Soviet Union. In 1992, he graduated from the University of Kyiv within the Faculty of History, and remained there afterwords to complete his postgraduate studies in the Faculty of Law, from which he graduated from in 1994. He then went abroad in 1996 to complete courses at Thames Valley University in the United Kingdom, before returning to Ukraine to become a staff member of the National Security and Defense Council of Ukraine. He worked as a longtime director of the political-legal programs for the think thank Razumkov Centre during this time also.

In 2002, he was appointed an external consultant for the Committee on Organized Crime and Corruption in the Verkhovna Rada, and then in 2004 he became a senior analyst for Viktor Yushchenko during the 2004 Ukrainian presidential election.

== Political career ==
Starting in 2005, he became a member of the leadership for campaigns of Our Ukraine, and was First Deputy Head of the Central Executive Committee for the party. However, he left Our Ukraine in 2008 due to Yushchenko's position on the Russo-Georgian War, specifically regarding his strong support of Georgian President Mikheil Saakashvili and not recognizing the suffering of Ossetians, while at the same time starting the Party of Regions was doing the same but with the opposite view. He also noted that he left like Yushchenko's hard line policy towards Russia was too radical, and ignored the political landscape of Ukraine at the time, and concluded the party had abandoned democratic principles.

He was elected to the Ukrainian Parliament in 2014 as a member of the Fatherland party. When Fatherland left the Yatsenyuk Government on 17 February 2016, Zhdanov refused to resign and was subsequently expelled from Fatherland. However, he retained his position in the Groysman Government, which was installed on 14 April 2016. He continued to serve as a minister until the Honcharuk government was established on 29 August 2019.

On August 29, 2019, Volodymyr Groysman's government resigned in accordance with Article 115 of the Constitution of Ukraine before the newly elected Verkhovna Rada of Ukraine, and Ihor Zhdanov was dismissed from the post of Minister of Youth and Sports of Ukraine.

Since December 2019, he has been a mentor of the USAID RADA Program: Responsible Accountable Democratic Parliamentary Representation.

Since January 1, 2020, he has been a member of the World Anti-Doping Agency (WADA Foundation Board Member), elected by the Committee of Ministers of the Council of Europe.

Political offices
Preceded by Dmytro Bulatov	Minister of Youth and Sports; 2014–2019	Succeeded by Volodymyr Borodiansky
