= Yurii Pavlenko =

Ukrainian politician

- Юрій Павленко
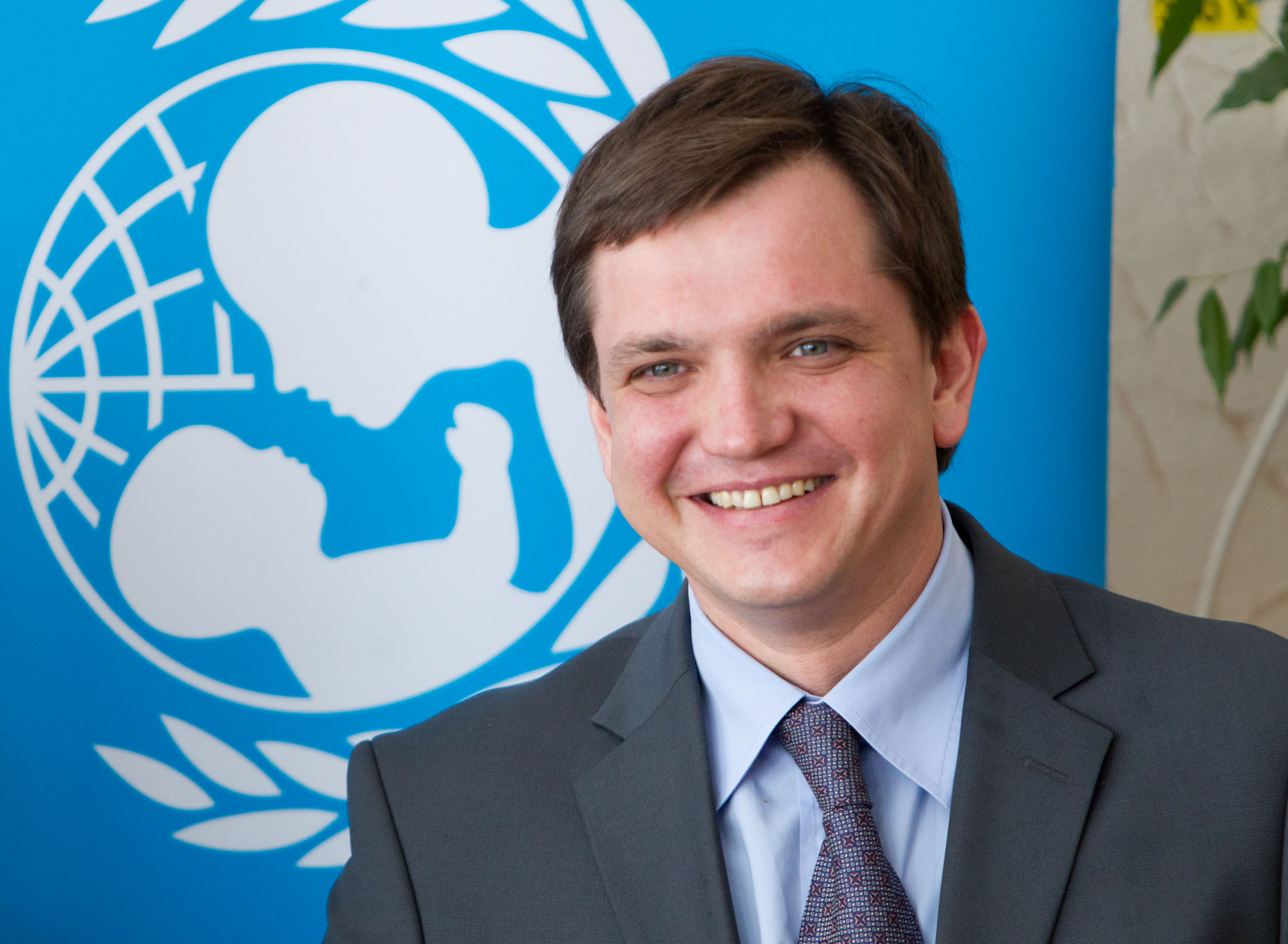
- Pavlenko in 2012

People's Deputy of Ukraine
- Incumbent
- Assumed office 27 November 2014
- Constituency: Opposition Bloc, No. 24 (2014–2019); Opposition Platform — For Life, No. 22 (2019–present)
- In office 23 November 2007 – 19 December 2007
- Constituency: Our Ukraine–People's Self-Defense Bloc, No. 7
- In office 25 May 2006 – 12 September 2006
- Constituency: Our Ukraine Bloc, No. 22
- In office 14 May 2002 – 3 March 2005
- Constituency: Our Ukraine Bloc, No. 40

Minister of Family, Youth, and Sports
- In office 19 December 2007 – 11 March 2010
- Prime Minister: Yulia Tymoshenko
- Preceded by: Viktor Korzh
- Succeeded by: Ravil Safiullin
- In office 26 February 2005 – 29 November 2006
- Prime Minister: Yulia Tymoshenko; Yuriy Yekhanurov; Viktor Yanukovych
- Preceded by: Mykola Kostenko
- Succeeded by: Viktor Korzh

Governor of Zhytomyr Oblast
- In office 26 December 2006 – 17 October 2007
- President: Viktor Yushchenko
- Preceded by: Yurii Andriichuk
- Succeeded by: Yurii Zabela

Personal details
- Born: 20 March 1975 (age 51) Kyiv, Ukrainian SSR, Soviet Union (now Ukraine)
- Party: Opposition Platform — For Life
- Other political affiliations: Youth Party of Ukraine (from 1999); Our Ukraine–People's Self-Defense Bloc (2002, 2006); Our Ukraine (from 2005); Opposition Bloc (2014)
- Education: Ukrainian Humanities Lyceum; Taras Shevchenko National University of Kyiv

Yurii Oleksiiovych Pavlenko (Ukrainian: Ю́рій Олексі́йович Павле́нко; born 20 March 1975) is a Ukrainian politician currently serving as a People's Deputy of Ukraine on the party list of Opposition Platform — For Life since 2019. He previously served as a member of Opposition Bloc's party list and a party-list People's Deputy from Our Ukraine Bloc between 2002 and 2006. Pavlenko has also held the office of children's ombudsman of Ukraine from 2011 to 2014, and worked as governor of Zhytomyr Oblast from 2006 to 2007.

== Biography ==
Yurii Oleksiiovych Pavlenko was born in the Ukrainian capital of Kyiv on 20 March 1975. He studied history at Ukrainian Humanities Lyceum and then at Taras Shevchenko National University of Kyiv before undertaking a Master of Public Administration degree at the Ukrainian Academy of Public Administration. He took a Ph.D. in 2010.

In 1999 Pavlenko became chairman of the Youth Party of Ukraine. He was elected a People's Deputy in the 2002 parliamentary election for the Our Ukraine Bloc. In 2005 he became a member of the People's Union "Our Ukraine" party. Pavlenko was reelected in 2006 and 2007 as an Our Ukraine Bloc candidate.

Pavlenko served as Minister of Family, Youth and Sports in the First Tymoshenko Government, the Yekhanurov Government, briefly in the Alliance of National Unity government and again in the Second Tymoshenko Government. From 2005 to 2007 Pavlenko was Ukraine's State Representative in the UNICEF Executive Board. From 26 December 2006 till 17 October 2007 Pavlenko was Governor of Zhytomyr Oblast. From 25 May to 24 October 2007 Pavlenko was a member of the National Security and Defense Council of Ukraine.

On 12 August 2011 Pavlenko was appointed by President Viktor Yanukovych to the position of 'Authorized representative of the President of Ukraine for Children's Rights', or children's ombudsman. Pavlenko said that this was done with the consent of the previous President, and leader of his party, Viktor Yushchenko.

On 24 February 2014, Pavlenko was dismissed as children's ombudsman by a decree of acting President Oleksandr Turchynov.

In the 2014 Ukrainian parliamentary election Pavlenko was again re-elected into parliament; this time after placing 24th on the electoral list of Opposition Bloc.

Pavlenko was re-elected, placed 22nd on the party list of Opposition Platform — For Life this time, in the 2019 Ukrainian parliamentary election.

Pavlenko is the first cousin of Ukrainian singer Maria Burmaka. In April 2017, he introduced a draft resolution of the Verkhovna Rada of Ukraine to dismiss the Minister of Social Policy for violating the Constitution of Ukraine, systematic failure to perform official duties, violation of the requirements of current legislation on ensuring the rights and interests of children affected by hostilities and armed conflict, orphans and children deprived of parental care.

Political offices
Preceded by Valentyna Dovzhenko	Minister of Family, Children and Youth; 2005–2005	Succeeded by reorganized as Ministry of Youth and Sports
Preceded by himself as Minister of Family, Children and Youth	Ministry of Youth and Sports (later as Minister of Family, Youth and Sports); 2005–2006	Succeeded by Viktor Korzh
Preceded by Yuriy Andriychuk	Governor of Zhytomyr Oblast; 2006–2007	Succeeded by Yuriy Zabela
Preceded by Viktor Korzh	Minister of Family, Youth and Sports; 2007–2010	Succeeded by Ravil Safiullin
