= Maria Burmaka =

Ukrainian singer (born 1970)

Maria Burmaka Марія Бурмака
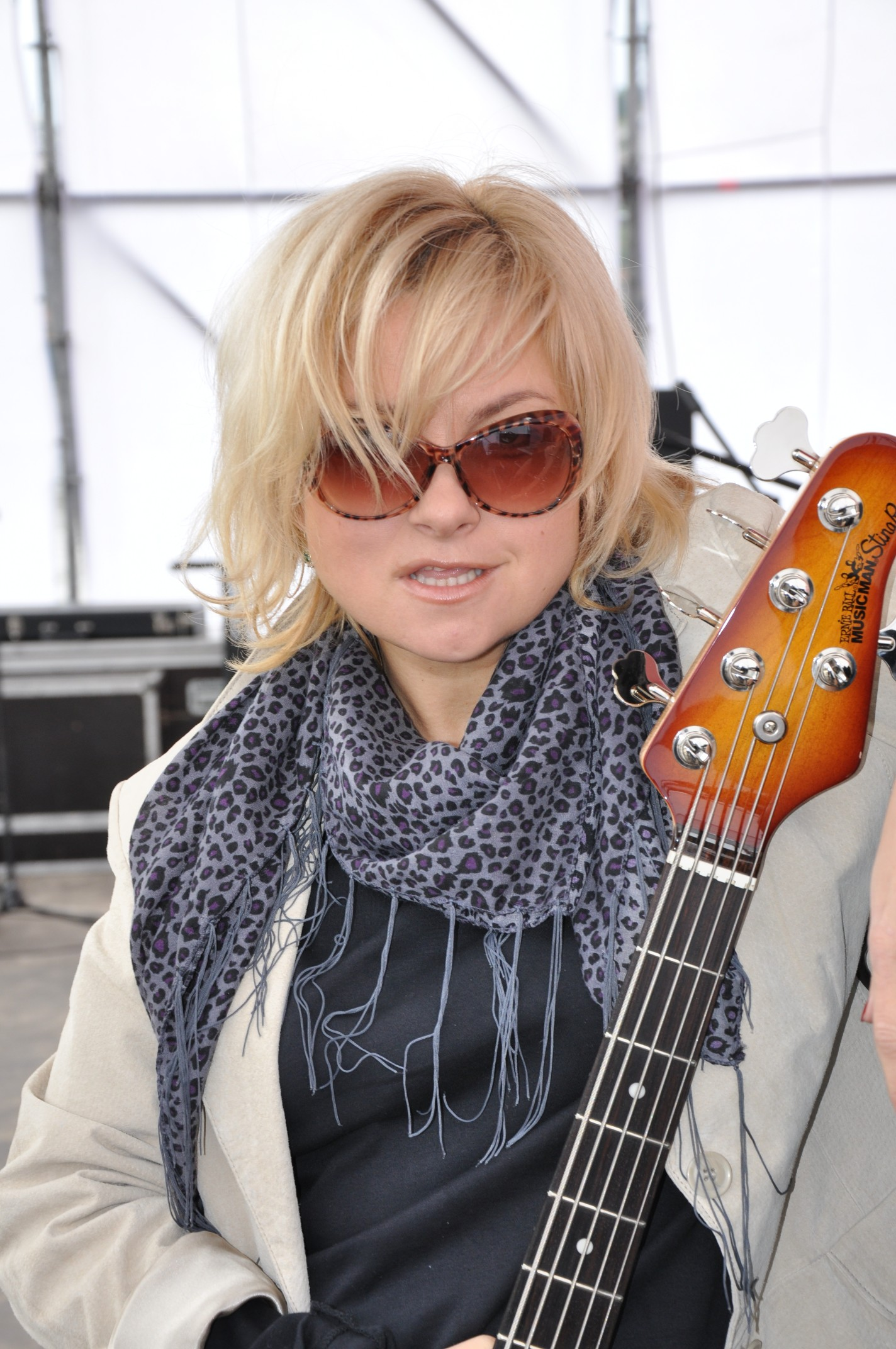

Background information
- Born: Maria Viktorivna Burmaka; June 17, 1970 (age 56); Kharkiv, Ukrainian SSR, Soviet Union
- Genre: Pop rock
- Occupations: Singer, actress
- Instrument: Vocals

Mariya Viktorivna Burmaka (Ukrainian: Марія Вікторівна Бурмака; born June 16, 1970) is a Ukrainian singer-songwriter, TV personality and musician active in the genres of rock, pop, folk, and world music. She also holds the title of People's Artist of Ukraine (1998). Early in her career, Burmaka won several important and All-Ukrainian musical contests or festivals, which quickly made her famous and made her an icon of the Ukrainian music.

== Biography ==
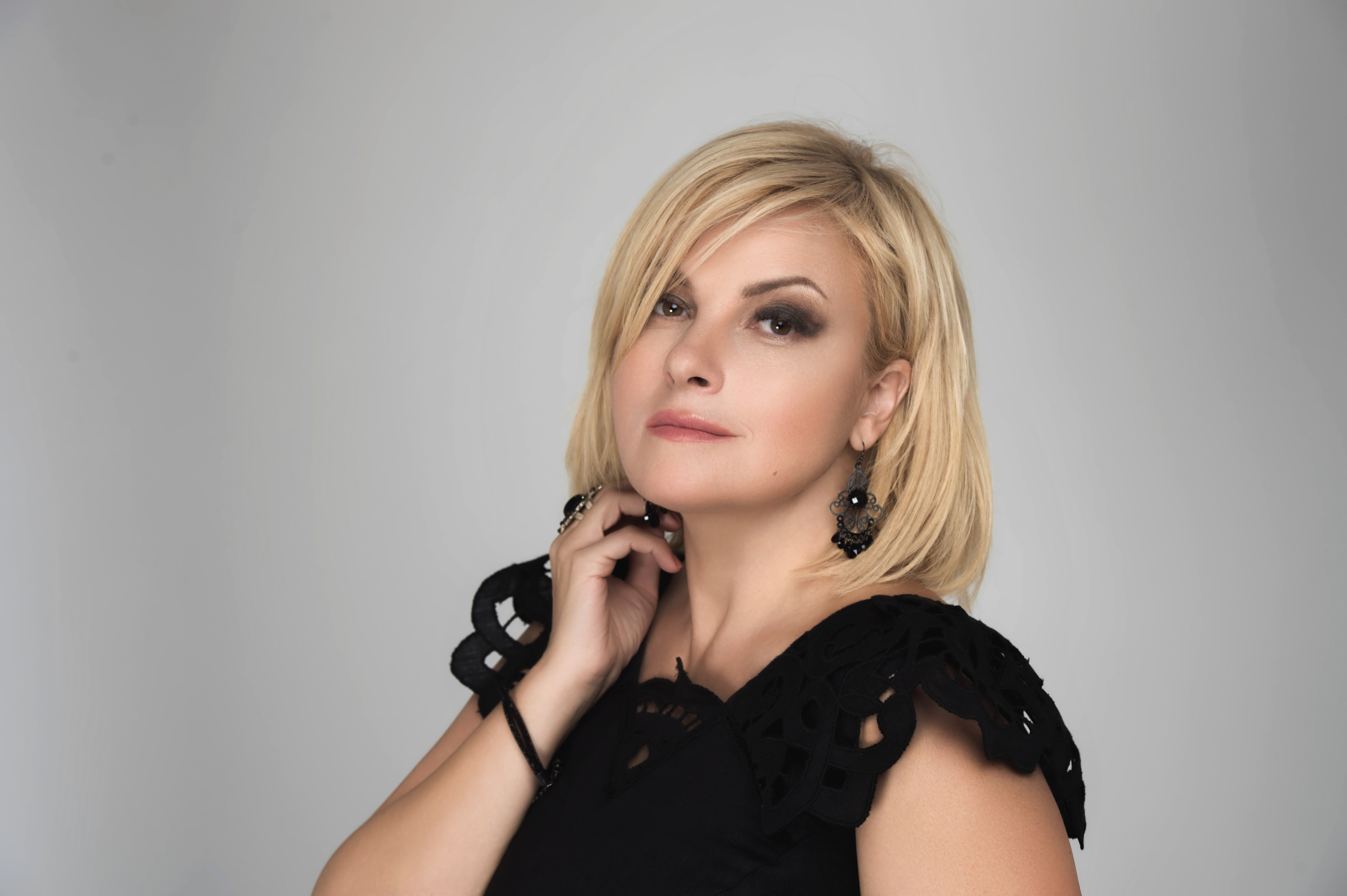
Maria Burmaka in 2018

Burmaka was born in Kharkiv, Ukrainian SSR, Soviet Union (now Ukraine), into a family of teachers. She began singing Ukrainian songs while studying in guitar class in a musical school. She graduated from that school, specializing in guitar. In 1987, she entered the faculty of philology of Kharkiv University, and in 1992 graduated with a candidate degree. As a student she began to write original songs.

In 2004 Burmaka graduated from the Taras Shevchenko National University of Kyiv with a degree in journalism.

== Music career ==
In 1989 Burmaka won first place in Lutsk at the Oberih music festival and came second at the famous Chervony Ruta youth music festival in Chernivtsi. In June 1990, she won in Kaniv the All-Ukrainian Festival DZVIN, earning the title of "Laureate". In 1990-1991 Burmaka toured Poland and Canada. In 1991 she recorded her first CD, Maria, which was produced in Montreal by the Canadian company Yevshan. This became the first Ukrainian-language musical CD to be launched in Ukraine. In 1992-1993 Burmaka participated in festivals Taras Bulba in Dubno, Vyvykh in Lviv, Povstanski Nochi ("Rebel Nights") in Rivne and Viter zi Skhodu ("Wind from the East") in Donetsk. During that period she also performed in the United States, France, Germany, the Czech Republic and Slovakia.

In 1993, Burmaka won the hit-song contest "12-2" organized by the radio platform Promin. In 1996 she participated in the World Music Festival in Adelaide. In 1998 Burmaka released another album, Znovu lyublyu ("In Love Again"). The presentation of the record was special: Burmaka invited her closest friends and the press to the 17–18th century icons hall in the National Fine Arts Museum, where she gave an acoustic guitar concert.

In 2000 Burmaka organized her own music band. Her other notable performances include the participation at Tavriyski Ihry ("Taurian Games") in Kakhovka (2002), Rock-Ekzystentsia in Kyiv (2003).

In 2005 Burmaka recorded several English versions of her songs, produced new musical clips, and gave several charity concerts in North America. She performed at the largest Ukrainian festival in the United States, Verkhovyna, and at the Lemkivska Vatra festival in Poland. In 2011, she gave a joint performance at the festival Soyuzivka.

In the summer and autumn of 2014, as part of the tour "Support Ours", she gave performances in the ATO zone, in frontline cities. The funds collected from these performances were spent on the needs of the volunteer battalion.

In the winter of 2015 the singer performed at charity concerts in the United Kingdom. That spring she also performed at charity concerts in the US, and in Canada that November.

=== Style and language ===
Burmaka is known for her sincere and emotional manner of performance, using original texts and use of folklore elements from her native Sloboda Ukraine. Many of her songs take their words from verse by classical Ukrainian poets such as Vasyl Chumak and Oleksandr Oles, as well as from folk songs like koliadkas, shchedrivkas, lullabies etc.

Burmaka is a staunch supporter of the Ukrainian language and is the only People's Artist of Ukraine who does not perform in Russian, nor has a musical repertoire in Russian. She stated, "Ukrainian regions without Ukrainian language lose their ethnic identity and freedom."

== TV career ==
In the 1990s Burmaka served as a TV host on STB channel, presenting shows including Kin, Rating, Who is there, and Teapot; and on the UT-1 channel with the show Create Yourself and Cultural-historical News (1996-1997).

In May 2011 Burmaka was the lead author of the show Music for Breakfast on the 1+1 channel. As of September 2011, she was the lead author of the show Music for adults with Maria Burmaka on the TVi channel. Currently, she is the lead author and host of the show Cult-Express on Espreso TV.

== Political involvement ==
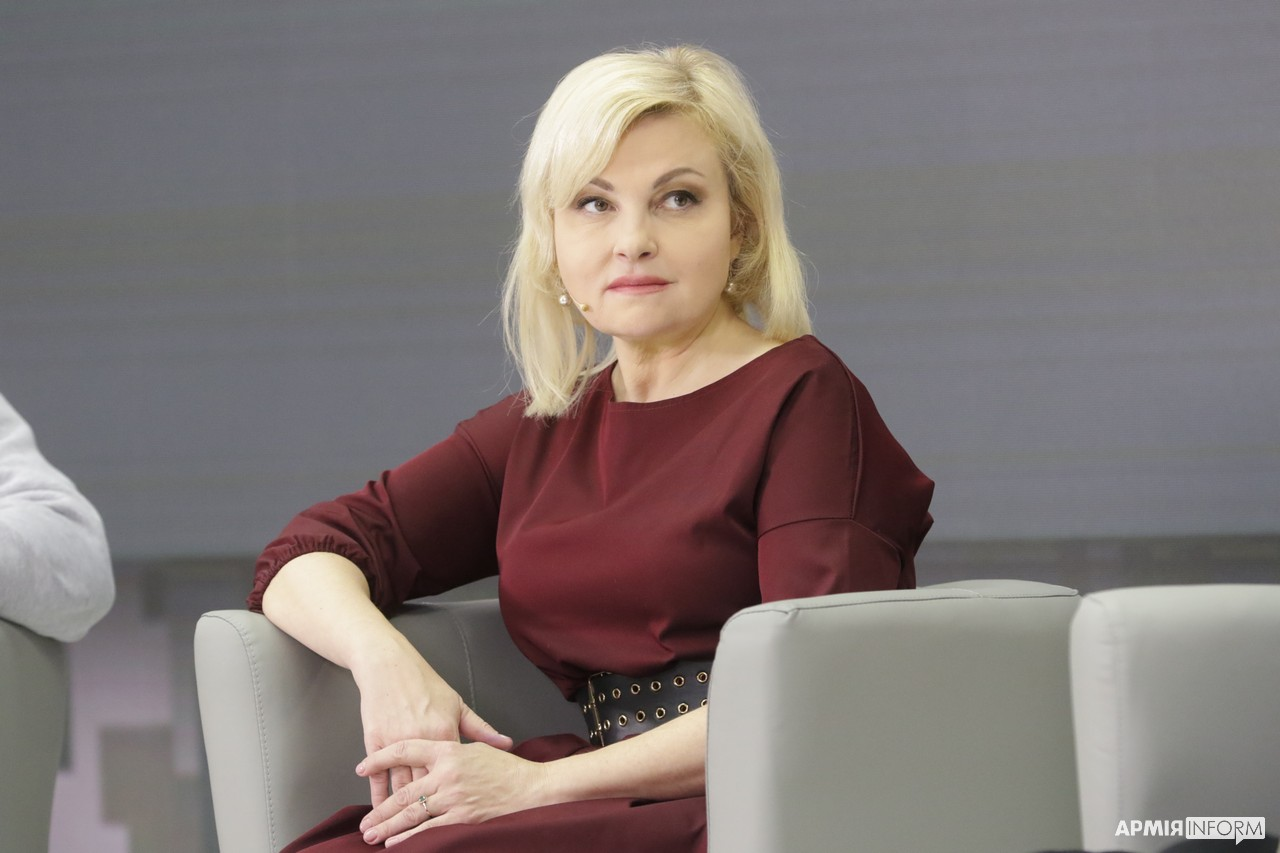
Burmaka in 2022

Burmaka has been an active participant in many events of modern Ukrainian history, including the aforementioned first Chervona Ruta festival (1989), Student Hunger on Granite (1990), "Orange Revolution" (2004) and Revolution of Dignity (2013–2014). Her song My idemo! ("We are coming!") became especially popular during the "Orange Revolution".

== Personal life ==
Burmaka was married to Dmytro Nebesiychuk from 1993 to 2003, having a daughter in 1995. In 2024 Burmaka stated that she "no longer plans to get married and sees no need for it."

Burmaka's brother, Sviatoslav Burmaka, was a military officer of the Armed Forces of Ukraine who served in the 43rd Artillery Brigade and died on 4 January 2024. Her cousin is Yuri Pavlenko.

== Awards and recognition ==
- 1997: received the title of Honored Artist of Ukraine
- 2007: awarded the Order of Princess Olga (III degree)
- 2009: awarded the honorary title "People's Artist of Ukraine"
- Named on Focus magazine's list of the top 100 most influential women in Ukraine

== Albums ==
- 1990 Ой не квiтни, весно (Oy ne kvitny, vesno; Oh Spring, Do Not Bloom...)
- 1991 Марiя (Mariya; Maria)
- 1994 Лишається надiя (Lyshayet'sia nadiya; Hope remains)
- 1998 Знову люблю (Znovu liubliu; I love again)
- 2001 Мiа (Mia)
- 2002 Iз янголом на плечi (Iz yanholom na plechi; With the angel on my shoulder)
- 2003 I Am
- 2003 Марія Бурмака Live (Maria Burmaka Live)
- 2004 No.9
- 2004 Ми йдемо! (We are coming!)
- 2008 Саундтреки (Soundtracks)
- 2010 Do not laugh at me (Не смійся з мене), joint album with Peter Yarrow
- 2011 Album for Children (Дитячий Альбом)
- 2014 Тінь по воді (Tin' na vodi; Shadow on the Water)
