= Ukrainian Fencing Federation =

Sports governing body in Ukraine

- Federation d'Escrime d'Ukraine
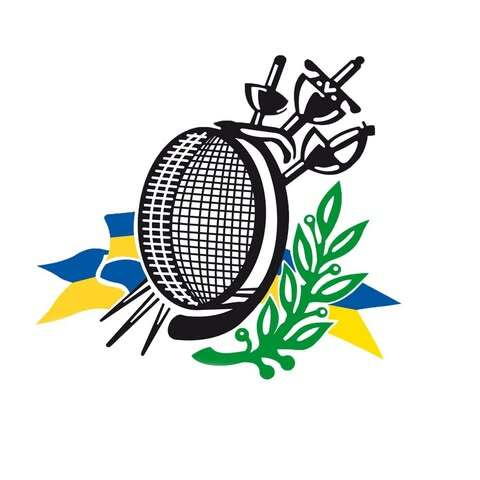
- Nickname: NFFU; National Fencing Federation of Ukraine
- Founded: 1992; 34 years ago
- Founded at: Ukraine
- Type: Sports federation
- Headquarters: Kyiv, Ukraine
- President: Mykhailo Illiashev
- Key people: Olena Shevchuk (Secretary General); Serhiy Mishchenko (First vice-president)
- Budget: €1,2 m
- Website: nffu.org

The Ukrainian Fencing Federation (Federation d'Escrime d'Ukraine; National Fencing Federation of Ukraine) commonly known by the acronym NFFU, established in 1992, is the governing body of Ukrainian fencing. Through 2022, Ukrainian fencers won 230 medals combined in the Olympic Games, World championships, and European championships.

== History ==
=== Early years ===
The federation was established in 1992. It is headquartered in Kyiv, Ukraine.

At the 1996 Summer Olympics in Atlanta, Ukraine performed as an independent team for the first time. It included six athletes participating in individual competitions: Sergei Golubitsky (foil), Vadym Gutzeit (saber), Viktoriya Titova (épée), Yeva Vybornova (épée), and Oleksii Bryzghalov (foil). Golubitsky and Gutzeit took sixth place, and the Ukrainian team took 11th place with 2 points.

At the 2000 Summer Olympics in Sydney, Ukrainian fencers were represented by three teams (foil (h), saber, foil (w), as well as one participant in individual competitions - Oleksandr Horbachuk (épée). Results: foil team (men) - 5th place, saber team - 6th place, foil team - 8th place Golubitsky took 6th place in the individual foil competition, while the rest of the Ukrainian fencers did not make it to the top.

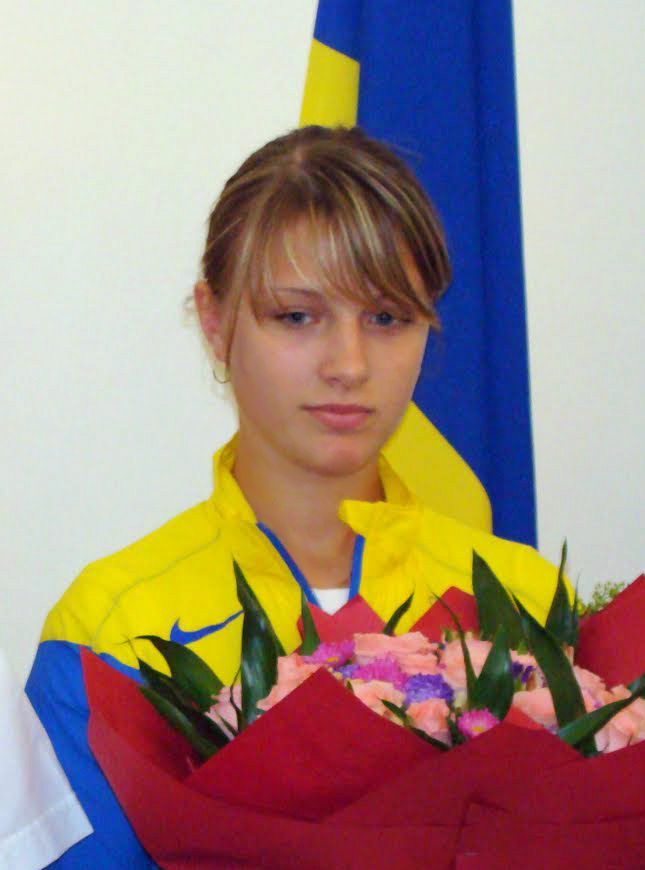
Olga Kharlan (2007).

During 2004–08, Ukrainian athletes won seven medals. These are representatives of the young Ukrainian school of fencing: Vladyslav Tretiak (saber), Volodymyr Lukashenko (saber), Oleh Shturbabin (saber), Olha Kharlan (saber), Olena Khomrova (saber), Dmytro Karyuchenko (épée), and Dmytro Chumak (épée).

At the 2008 Summer Olympics in Athens, Vladyslav Tretiak won a bronze medal in men's individual sabre.

At the 2008 Summer Olympics, two types of weapons were supported: women's saber and men's épée. They took part in individual and team competitions and two athletes (Olha Leleiko - foil, Yana Shemyakina - épée) - in individual competitions. The women's saber team led by 17-year-old Olga Kharlan won the gold medal, and the men's épée took 7th place.

Kharlan won the sabre gold medal at the 2009 European Fencing Championships, both in the individual event and the team event with Team Ukraine, in which Ukraine overcame Russia.

At the 2009 World Fencing Championships, Anfisa Pochkalova won the bronze medal in the individual épée competition. Kharlan made her way to the women's saber final, only to be stopped by American two-time Olympic champion Mariel Zagunis. In the women's saber team event, Ukraine defeated France in the final to come away with the gold medal. For this performance the Ukrainian team was named team of the year and Kharlan was named athlete of the year at the Ukrainian Heroes of Sports Year ceremony held in April 2010.

In the 2009–10 season Kharlan won her fourth Junior World Championship in a row. At the 2010 European Fencing Championships Ukraine won gold in women's saber, after beating Russia in the final.

=== 2010–2020 ===
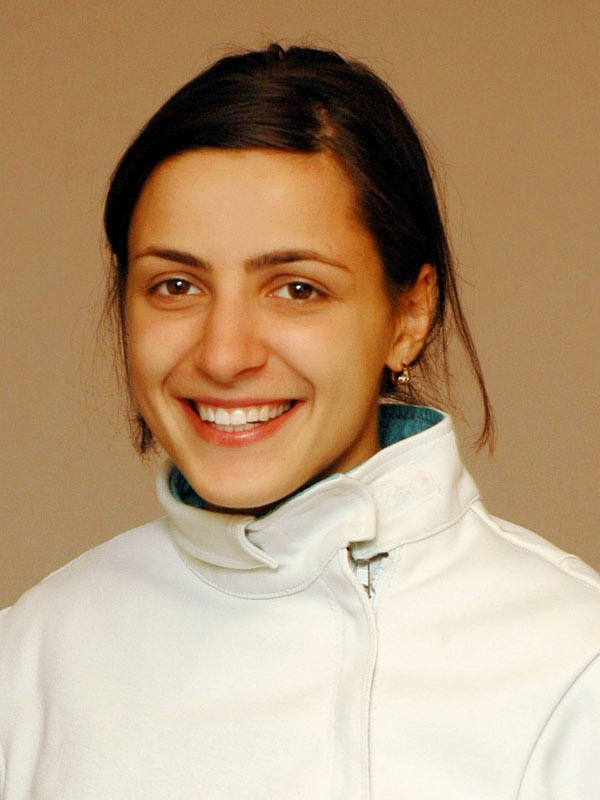
Yana Shemyakina (2006).

At the 2010 World Fencing Championships in Paris, Olha Kharlan won the silver medal in the individual women's saber competition, and Olena Khomrova won the bronze medal. In the team competition, 13 female sabers received silver medals. Rostyslav Hertsyk won 7th place in the men's individual foil competition. At the 2010 European Fencing Championships, Team Ukraine won a gold medal in women's sabre, defeating Russia in the final.

In the 2012 Summer Olympics in London, Kharlan won a bronze medal in the individual women's saber event. Yana Shemyakina became the Olympic champion in women's épée. At the 2012 European Fencing Championships, Kharlan won the gold medal.

At the 2013 World Championships in Budapest, Hungary, Olga Kharlan won the gold medal in the women's individual saber fencing competition, her first individual world championship. The national women's saber team of Ukraine won the gold medal in the team competition, defeating Russia in the finals.

At the 2014 European Fencing Championships in Strasbourg, France, Kharlan earned her fourth European gold medal in a row and the fifth of her career.

At the 2014 World Fencing Championships in Kazan, Russia, Olga Kharlan became the world champion in the individual women's saber competition. The Ukrainian saber team took third place in the team event, winning a bronze medal. Yana Shemyakina won a bronze medal in the individual épée fencing competition.

At the 2016 Summer Olympics in Rio de Janeiro, Brazil, Kharlan bested French competitor Manon Brunet for the bronze medal, and Team Ukraine won the women's sabre silver medal. At the 2018 European Fencing Championships, Team Ukraine won the silver medal in women's sabre.

At the 2019 World Fencing Championships in Budapest, Hungary, Kharlan won 15–14 against Russia's Sofya Velikaya in the women’s saber finals; it was Kharlan’s sixth world championship title. At the 2019 European Fencing Championships, Kharlan won the gold medal in women's individual sabre.

At the 2020 Summer Olympics in Tokyo, Japan, Ihor Reizlin won a bronze medal in individual men's epee.

=== 2022–present ===
After the Russian invasion of Ukraine the Ukrainian Fencing Federation (UFF) has made multiple appeals to fellow members of the International Fencing Federation to vote against the return of Russian and Belarusian fencers.

In July 2023 in Phoenix, Arizona, at the 2023 US Summer Nationals, Ukrainian fencer Darii Lukashenko and tournament sabre champion Konstantin Lokhanov of Russia embraced and held the Ukrainian flag together to express support for Ukrainians during the Russian invasion.

Later in July 2023, Ukrainian four-time individual world sabre champion Olga Kharlan was disqualified by the Fédération Internationale d'Escrime (FIE) at the World Fencing Championships in Milan, Italy. Kharlan defeated Russian Anna Smirnova 15-7. Smirnova extended her hand to Kharlan, who in turn extended her saber in an offer to the Russian to tap blades. Kharlan said her choice of salute was meant as a sign of respect for her opponent, while still acknowledging the ongoing conflict between Ukraine and Russia. After a long delay during which Smirnova protested and sat on the strip for 45 minutes, Kharlan was ultimately black-carded and eliminated from the championship by FIE officials. The Russian had been allowed to compete as a neutral athlete. The National Fencing Federation of Ukraine filed an appeal.

Russian Olympic fencer Konstantin Lokhanov, who had denounced the Russian invasion of Ukraine and in reaction to it has defected to the United States, said in a New York Times interview that he thought the Russian fencer might have set a trap for Kharlan, to seek her disqualification. Lokhanov said that on the one hand, the FIE had rules about shaking hands. On the other hand, he noted, the tapping of weapon blades -- in lieu of a handshake -- was the accepted acknowledgment of an opponent during the pandemic, and was still considered suitable by many fencers. Lokhanov said: "I support Olga. In my opinion she made the right decision. I understand why she made it. But I don’t see any reason why this Russian woman had to make that drama. She could have just touched blades; the bout was over.”

On 28 July at the behest of the IOC, the FIE's disqualification of Kharlan was cancelled by the FIE, making it possible for her to enter the team event on 29 July. Kharlan was also told by the IOC that due to the circumstances she was being granted automatic qualification into the 2024 Paris Olympics.

== Duties of organization ==
NFFU, a non-profit organization, is focused on developing fencing in Ukraine by involving broad circles of the population in classes, and increasing the skill level of fencers. The organization holds all-Ukrainian competitions for various ages and levels, and organizes official international fencing competitions in Ukraine and all-Ukrainian sports events, and represents Ukraine fencing at official international fencing competitions. Through 2022, Ukrainian fencers won 230 medals combined in the Olympic Games, World championships, and European championships.
