= Ravil Safiullin =

Ukrainian football executive and politician

- Равіль Сафіуллін
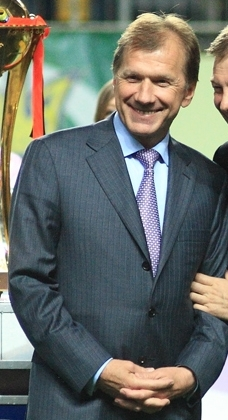
- Safiullin in 2011

Minister of Youth and Sports
- In office 11 March 2010 – 27 February 2014
- Prime Minister: Mykola Azarov
- Preceded by: Yurii Pavlenko
- Succeeded by: Dmytro Bulatov

Personal details
- Born: 4 February 1955 (age 71) Makiivka, Ukrainian SSR, Soviet Union (now Ukraine)
- Party: Party of Regions
- Education: Donetsk Medical Institute

Ravil Safovych Safiullin (Ukrainian: Равіль Сафович Сафіуллін; born 4 February 1955) is a Ukrainian football executive and politician who served as Minister of Youth and Sports.

== Biography ==
Prior to his ministerial position, Safiullin was president of Professional Football League of Ukraine between 2000 and 2008. He is still the Honorary President of PFL Ukraine.

Aged 23, Safiullin graduated from the Donetsk Medical Institute in 1978 as a hygienist and epidemiologist. From 1977 to 1993 he worked at medical service. From 1994 to 2000 he worked the vice-president of FC Shakhtar Donetsk. In 2000, he was elected as the president of Professional Football League of Ukraine. Safiullin was elected as a People's Deputy of Ukraine during the 2002, 2006 and 2007 Ukrainian parliamentary elections as a member of the Party of Regions.

Safiullin was selected as Minister of Family, Youth, and Sports of Ukraine in the First Azarov government, and began serving on 11 March 2010.

On 28 February 2013, President Yanukovych reorganized the Ministry of Education and Science, Youth and Sports and the State Service for Youth and Sports, creating a Ministry of Education and the (new) Ministry of Youth and Sports; Safiullin was awarded the ministership of this new institution.

Safiullin did not participate in the 2014 Ukrainian parliamentary election.

In 2020, he became the President of the Ukrainian Athletic Federation. Acting President of the Athletics Federation of Ukraine in January 2023 was Yevhen Pronin.

Sporting positions
Preceded by Hryhoriy Surkis	Presidents of PFL; 2000–2008	Succeeded by Sviatoslav Syrota
Political offices
Preceded by Yurii Pavlenko	Minister of Family, Youth, and Sports; 11 March – 9 December 2010	Succeeded by Post merged with Ministry of Education
Preceded by Post revived	Minister of Youth and Sports; 28 February 2013 – 27 February 2014	Succeeded by Dmytro Bulatov
