= Ministry of Youth and Sports (Ukraine) =

Government ministry of Ukraine

- Міністерство молоді та спорту

Agency overview
- Formed: 6 June 1991
- Preceding agency: State Committee of the Ukrainian SSR in affairs of youth and sports
- Jurisdiction: Government of Ukraine
- Headquarters: 42, Esplanadna st., Kyiv.
- Agency executive: Matviy Bidnyi, Minister of Youth and Sports
- Parent agency: Government of Ukraine
- Child agencies: Department of Youth Policy; Department of Olympic sports; Department of non-Olympic sports and Physical Culture
- Website: Official Website

The Ministry of Youth and Sports of Ukraine (Note: Ukrainian: Міністерство молоді та спорту України, romanized: Ministerstvo molodi ta sportu Ukrainy, IPA: [miniˈstɛrstwo moɫoˈdi tɑ ˈspɔrtʊ ʊkrɐˈjine]) is a government ministry of Ukraine established on 6 June 1991 after reorganization of the Soviet State Committee of the Ukrainian SSR in affairs of youth and sports. As a government ministry, it is member of the Cabinet of Ministers of Ukraine and exists with some breaks since 1991. The Ukrainian ministry enforces realization a state policy of youth and sports, including Olympic, non-Olympic, and mass physical culture. While the national sport in Ukraine is governed by the National Olympic Committee of Ukraine, the ministry provides additional guidance.

It was reestablished again in 2013 by splitting away from the Ministry of Education and Science where it existed as its subdepartment from 2010 to 2013.

The Honcharuk Government (on 29 August 2019) merged the ministry with the Ministry of Culture. But its succeeding Shmyhal Government undid this merge.

The current minister is Matviy Bidnyi.

== History ==
The Ministry of Youth and Sports was first created in 1991 when two state committees of physical culture and sports and another of youth (minor) affairs were merged.

In 1996 the organ was reorganized when there was created a new ministry in family affairs and youth, while sports agency was degraded to its child agency as a state committee. Until 2005 it was a state committee.

In 2000 the reorganization of the Ministry of Family Affairs and Youth led to its liquidation and both youth and sports agencies were merged again along with the state committee of tourism for less than a year.

In 2004–2005 the Ministry of Family Affairs and Youth was revived, and sports agency once again became its child agency as a state committee.

In 2005 the ministry of youth and sports was reestablished again. In 2005–2005 there existed the combined Ministry of Family Affairs, Youth and Sports.

In 2010 the Government of Ukraine led by Party of Regions in announced about reorganization of its government hierarchy when the consolidated ministry was merged again with the Ministry of Education and Science for the next three years as part of the 2010 Yanukovych administrative reform, while agency for sports was degraded to the state service of youth and sports. Finally in 2013 the state service again was given the ministerial portfolio.

The agency in charge of tourism was oscillated and renamed in 2001 as the State Tourism Administration and later in 2004 it was transferred to the Ministry of Culture.

In 2019-2020 the Ministry of Youth and Sports was combined with the Ministry of Culture as part of the 2019 Zelenskyy administrative reform.

Since 2020, the government agency of youth and sports has been split from the Ministry of Culture and its own ministry.

== Criticism ==
In December 2001 a committee chairman Maria Bulatova in interview to Mirror Weekly explained that since the independence of Ukraine, the provision for the state institution was de facto copy-pasted from similar institution of the Ukrainian SSR and without even considering the fact that its development strategy was forming out of Moscow by the Central Committee of the Communist Party of the Soviet Union and State Committee of Sport of the Soviet Union.

== Leadership ==
=== Heads of Family and Children ===
Ministry of Family Affairs and Youth was established in 1996 by merging two committees of Women Affairs, Motherhood, and Minors and another of Youth (Minors) Affairs with Ministry on Youth Affairs and Sports.

Name of Ministry	Name of minister	Term of Office	
Name of Ministry	Name of minister	Start	End
Ministry on Family Affairs and Youth	Syuzanna Stanik	September 1996	August 1997
Ministry on Family Affairs and Youth	Valentyna Dovzhenko	21 August 1997	22 March 1999
State Committee on Family Affairs and Youth	Valentyna Dovzhenko	1999	2000
State Committee on Family Affairs and Youth	Valentyna Dovzhenko	2001	2004
Ministry on Family Affairs, Children, and Youth	Valentyna Dovzhenko	6 February 2004	3 February 2005
Ministry on Family Affairs, Children, and Youth	Yuriy Pavlenko	4 February 2005	26 February 2005

=== Heads of Sports ===
Name of Ministry	Name of minister	Term of Office	
Name of Ministry	Name of minister	Start	End
Higher Council of Physical Culture	Sergei Andreyev	16 May 1935	28 June 1936
Committee of Physical Culture and Sports	Sergei Andreyev	28 June 1936	7 September 1936
Committee of Physical Culture and Sports	Mykhailo Bunchuk	1943	1948
Committee of Physical Culture and Sports	Volodymyr Kulyk	November 1968	December 1973
Committee of Physical Culture and Sports	Mykhailo Baka	December 1973	July 1990
State Committee of Youth, Physical Culture and Sports	Valeriy Borzov	1990	1991
Minister on Youth Affairs and Sports	Valeriy Borzov	6 June 1991	20 August 1996
State Committee of Physical Culture and Sports (Note: Part of Ministry on Family Affairs and Youth)	Valeriy Borzov	1996	1997
State Committee of Physical Culture and Sports	Ivan Fedorenko	26 August 1997	19 June 1999
State Committee of Physical Culture and Sports	Alexander Volkov	2 August 1999	10 January 2000
State Committee of Youth Policy, Sports, and Tourism	Ivan Fedorenko	14 February 2000	27 November 2000
State Committee of Youth Policy, Sports, and Tourism	Valeriy Tsybukh	2001	2001
State Committee of Physical Culture and Sports	Maria Bulatova	November 2001	4 February 2003
State Committee of Physical Culture and Sports	Mykola Kostenko	4 February 2003	2005
Minister on Youth Affairs and Sports	Yuriy Pavlenko	26 February 2005	18 August 2005
Minister on Family Affairs, Youth, and Sports	Yuriy Pavlenko	18 August 2005	29 November 2006
Minister on Family Affairs, Youth, and Sports	Viktor Korzh	1 December 2006	18 December 2007
Minister on Family Affairs, Youth, and Sports	Yuriy Pavlenko	19 December 2007	11 March 2010
Minister on Family Affairs, Youth, and Sports	Ravil Safiullin	11 March 2010	9 December 2010
State Service of Youth and Sports (Note: Part of Ministry of Education and Science of Ukraine)	Ravil Safiullin	9 December 2010	28 February 2013
Minister of Youth and Sports	Ravil Safiullin	28 February 2013	27 February 2014
Minister of Youth and Sports	Dmytro Bulatov	27 February 2014	2 December 2014
Minister of Youth and Sports	Ihor Zhdanov	2 December 2014	29 August 2019
Minister of Culture, Youth and Sports	Volodymyr Borodiansky	29 August 2019	4 March 2020
Minister of Youth and Sports	Vadym Gutzeit	4 March 2020	9 November 2023
Minister of Youth and Sports	Matviy Bidnyi	9 November 2023	Incumbent

== See also ==
- Ministry of Education and Science of Ukraine
