= Ukrainian Humanities Lyceum =

Ukrainian Humanitarian Lyceum
- Type: Government
- Established: 1991
- Affiliations: Taras Shevchenko National University of Kyiv
- President: Olena Ivachshenko
- Students: 342
- Location: Kyiv, Ukraine
- Website: https://uhl-edu.com

Ukrainian Humanities Lyceum (UHL) is a high school educational institution in the Pechersk district of the city Kyiv. It was founded in 1991. Ukrainian Humanitarian Lyceum is a subdivision of Taras Shevchenko National University of Kyiv. Admission is done on a competitive basis and the main areas of training include philological, historical, economic and law.

== History ==
1991 — year of foundation
1994 — reorganization of the Lyceum in subdivisions of Kyiv Taras Shevchenko University
2000 – Philosophical added to the three main fields of study
2007–2013 — first in Ukraine by results of External independent testing

== Famous graduates ==
Among the graduates of the Lyceum of different years, many influential Ukrainian journalists, including Lidia Taran, Maxim Drabok, Natalie Fitsych, Alex Ananov, Tatiana Kur, Alex Berdnick, Godovanets Olga, Natalia Ivchenko ( Turchak ), Anna Berezetska, Bogdan Nasal, Natalia Nedilko, Maxim Butkevych, politicians and diplomats Yuriy Pavlenko, Alexander Kravchenko, and Lesya Orobets.

Graduates include popular singer Kate Chile, director and actor Philip Illyenko, screenwriter Natalie Kononchuk, and the lawyer of European Court of Human Rights Olga Dmytrenko .

== Other ==
Asteroid 318794 Ugliya that was discovered in 2005 by Andrushivka Astronomical Observatory was named after the Lyceum.
