= National Olympic Committee of Ukraine =

National Olympic Committee

- Country: Ukraine
- Code: UKR
- Created: 1990 (1918, unconfirmed)
- Recognized: 1993
- Continental Association: EOC
- Headquarters: Kyiv, Ukraine
- President: Vadym Gutzeit
- Secretary General: Natalia Kovalenko
- Website: noc-ukr.org

The National Olympic Committee of Ukraine (Ukrainian: Нацiональний олiмпiйський комiтет України, romanized: Natsionalnyi olimpiiskyi komitet Ukrainy; IOC Code: UKR) is a non-profit all-Ukrainian public organization responsible for development, reinforcement, and protection of the Olympic movement. The organization adheres to the International Olympic Charter. The committee has an exclusive right to represent Ukraine in the Olympic Games and other competitions of the International Olympic Committee. In November 2022, Vadym Gutzeit was elected the new President of the National Olympic Committee of Ukraine.

The National Olympic Committee of Ukraine is supported by the Ministry of Youth and Sports of Ukraine.

== History ==
The history of the Olympic movement in Ukraine started in 1952 when Ukrainian athletes participated at the Games of the XV Olympiad in Helsinki as a part of the U.S.S.R. Team for the first time.

During 1952 – 1990 the Olympic movement in Ukraine was developing and strengthening its position in the country's life. Ukrainian athletes constituted at least 25% of the composition of each USSR Olympic team. During the Games of the XXII Olympiad in 1980 some matches of football tournament took place in Kyiv and it was a great success.

On 22 December 1990 the First General Assembly of founders took the decision to create the National Olympic Committee of Ukraine and the date mentioned above is the official date of its foundation. On recommendations of the International Olympic Committee, on 20 September 1991 in Ukraine was established the Ukrainian Olympic Academy on decision of the first session of the Ukrainian Olympic Assembly. The academy is an independent public organization that functions under the auspices of the NOC of Ukraine and promotes development and strengthening of Olympic movement in Ukraine, spiritual interpersonal enrichment among people, proliferation the exchange of values of national culture marked by the ideas and principles of Olympism.

Couple of weeks after the referendum on independence, on 18 December 1991 the Verkhovna Rada petitioned to the International Olympic Committee to recognize the National Olympic Committee of Ukraine as a participant of Olympic movement since 1952.

The NOC of Ukraine was permanently recognized by the International Olympic Committee in September 1993.

In 1995 the NOC of Ukraine started to publish its official monthly magazine "Olimpiyska Arena" ("Olympic Arena") and since 1997 it issues twice a month bulletin "Olympic News from the NOC of Ukraine".

On 28 March 2017 the National Olympic Committee of Ukraine signed a memorandum on cooperation with the International Children Center "Artek" (Carpathian).

In 2025, the National Olympic Committee of Ukraine updated its official website. The update included changes to the site's structure and navigation, as well as the restoration of a digital archive covering Olympic events and results since 2000. The platform was developed in cooperation with the IT company PlantIn and was later awarded "Website of the Year for Sports Organization" at the SBC Ukraine Awards 2025.

=== List of founders ===
- Representatives of the republican sports federations recognized by their respective International Federations
- Members of the National Olympic Committee of the Soviet Union who reside on territory of Ukraine
- Councils of the Ukrainian Federation of Independent Trade Unions
- Central Committee of the Lenin's Communist League of Youth
- Republican council of the Voluntary Sports Society of Trade Unions
- Ukrainian council of the Dynamo Sports Society
- Republican council of the Kolos Sports Society
- Republican council of the All-Union Sports Society Trudovi Rezervy
- Sports clubs of the Army
- Central Committee of DOSAAF (Volunteer Society for the Assistance to the Army, Aviation, and Navy)
- State Committee of Television and Radio broadcasting
- Ministry of higher and middle special education
- Ministry of national education
- Ministry of healthcare
- Institutes of physical culture
- Editorial offices of "Sportyvna Hazeta" newspaper
- Editorial offices of "Start" magazine
- athletes and coaches
- public and state institutions that facilitate Olympic movement
- selected citizens of Ukraine who support Olympic movement

== Description of the NOC ==
The NOC of Ukraine is working in accordance with the provisions of the Olympic Charter, the Ukrainian Constitution, the Ukrainian legislation and own Statutes.

Main tasks of the NOC of Ukraine are:

- to promote the preparation to and participation of athletes at the Olympic Games;
- to develop the international collaboration;
- to spread popular sports and healthy way of life;
- to enrich people physically and spiritually.

For this purpose the NOC of Ukraine cooperates with state, public and other organizations. The National Olympic Committee of Ukraine unites 40 Ukrainian Olympic sports federations.

The NOC of Ukraine participated in 6 winter editions and 5 summer editions of the Olympic Games.

- Lillehammer 1994 – 1 gold and 1 bronze medals;
- Atlanta 1996 – 9 gold, 5 silver, 9 bronze medals;
- Nagano 1998 – 1 silver medal;
- Sydney 2000 – 3 gold, 10 silver and 10 bronze medals;
- Salt Lake City 2002 – without medals;
- Athens 2004 – 8 gold, 5 silver and 9 bronze medals;
- Torino 2006 – 2 bronze medals;
- Beijing 2008 – 7 gold, 5 silver and 15 bronze medals;
- Vancouver 2010 – without medals;
- London 2012 – 6 gold, 5 silver and 9 bronze medals:
- Sochi 2014 – 1 gold and 1 bronze medals.

Mr. Sergey Bubka and Mr. Valeriy Borzov are officially elected as honorary members of International Olympic Committee in Ukraine.

The National Olympic Committee of Ukraine has its regional branches in each region of Ukraine. In similar way the Ukrainian Olympic Academy also has its regional branches in various educational institutions throughout Ukraine. To resolve any disagreements, there also exists Sport Arbitration Tribunal.

=== Committee Composition ===
- Two representatives from each (40) National Sport Federation (Olympic sports)
- 15 athletes, participants of the Olympic Games
- a representative of the Olympic Academy of Ukraine
- a representative from each (4) fitness-sports club (Spartak, Dynamo, Ukraina, Kolos) and administrations of fitness and sports for both Ministry of Education and Ministry of Defense
- other representatives of the Olympic movement

Consists of 154 members

== Presidents ==
Presidents	Term years
Valeriy Borzov	1990–1998
Ivan Fedorenko	1998–2002
Viktor Yanukovych	2002–2005
Serhiy Bubka	2005–2022
Vadym Gutzeit	2022–present

== NOC Projects ==
=== Heroes of Sports Year ===
'All-Ukrainian Ceremony Heroes of Sports Year' is the sport event which has been held on the main stages of the country since 2007. The occasion's purpose is to meet Olympic champions and medallists of all periods of time; coaches and sports specialists.

The sports Oscar is presented to athletes and coaches who won medals at the Olympic and world sports arenas. Sports organizers whose contribution was recognized the most substantial also get this award.

=== The Olympic Book, The Olympic Corner ===
Since 2011 National Olympic Committee of Ukraine together with the Olympic Academy of Ukraine organizes the nationwide actions The Olympic Book and The Olympic Corner. During these projects each of over 20 000 schools and each of 230 classes is provided with Olympic literature and sports equipment.

The main goal is the development of the Olympic movement in Ukraine, promotion of healthy lifestyles, spreading the ideas of Olympism.

=== The Olympic Lesson ===
The Olympic lesson is the annual sports event which was initiated by National Olympic Committee of Ukraine since 2004. The Olympic Lesson is held in all regions of the country.

The Lesson of Physical Education and Sports features open training sessions and demonstrations across more than 40 sports venues, with appearances by Olympic, World, and European champions.

=== Olympic Day ===
Olympic Day is a tradition to celebrate the founding of the International Olympic Committee (23 June 1894). Olympic Day is a family event offering various events ranging from runs, Olympic quizzes, various sport events and competitions.

The Olympic Day takes place in the central town streets, in parks, children's camps, stadiums of different regions.

Together with the ordinary citizens Ukrainian athletes, Olympic champions and medalists, winners of the World and European Championships participate at the all-Ukrainian event.

If your state of health does not allow you to participate in athletics races, you can join the contests, quizzes, and draws.

All members can find something useful and join to the Olympic ideas and values.

=== Olympic stork ===
Olympic stork is the project of National Olympic Committee of Ukraine which promotes the Olympic ideas, attracts children to physical education and sport, and brings up young generation based on the principles of patriotism and friendship.

All the year the 5th -6th formers take a quiz on the Olympic movement topic, participate in the relay races, teams' presentations and many different contests. The team-winner of all 25 Ukrainian regions compete at all-Ukrainian final.

=== Pole Vaulting at Maidan ===
In 2007 competition of pole stars the Pole Vaulting at Maidan was initiated by National Olympic Committee of Ukraine. This event is organized by NOC of Ukraine and the Athletics Federation of Ukraine and is included to the official IAAF calendar.

The top athletes compete in the outdoor event at the main square of the country.

In 2011 Russian Aleksey Kovalchuk set a record of the tournament- 5.72 m.

The world record in the male pole vault outdoor – 6.14 m – belonging to Sergey Bubka. He also set the still unbroken indoor record at 6.15 m.

== Collective members ==
=== National Sports Federations ===
There are 46 national federations for Olympic sports which are members of the NOC:

National Federation	Summer or Winter	Headquarters
Ukrainian Archery Federation	Summer	Kyiv
Ukrainian Athletic Federation	Summer	Kyiv
Badminton Federation of Ukraine	Summer	Kyiv
Baseball & Sotball Federation of Ukraine	Summer	Kyiv
Basketball Federation of Ukraine	Summer	Kyiv
Biathlon Federation of Ukraine	Winter	Kyiv
Ukrainian Bobseigh Federation	Winter	Kyiv
Ukrainian Boxing Federation	Summer	Kyiv
Ukrainian Canoe Federation	Summer	Kyiv
Ukrainian Curling Federation	Winter	Kyiv
Ukrainian Cycling Federation	Summer	Kyiv
Ukrainian Diving Federation	Summer	Kyiv
Equestrian Federation of Ukraine	Summer	Kyiv
Ukrainian Fencing Federation	Summer	Kyiv
Ukrainian Figure Skating Federation	Winter	Kyiv
Football Federation of Ukraine	Summer	Kyiv
Ukrainian Golf Federation	Summer	Kyiv
Greco-Roman Wrestling Federation of Ukraine	Summer	Kyiv
Ukrainian Gymnastics Federation	Summer	Kyiv
Handball Federation of Ukraine	Summer	Kyiv
Ukrainian Hockey Federation	Summer	Kyiv
Ice Hockey Federation of Ukraine	Winter	Kyiv
Ukrainian Judo Federation	Summer	Kyiv
Ukrainian Karate Federation	Summer	Kyiv
Ukrainian Luge Federation	Winter	Kyiv
Ukrainian Modern Pentathlon Federation	Summer	Kyiv
Ukrainian Federation of Rhythmic Gymnastics	Summer	Kyiv
Ukrainian Federation of Roller Sports	Summer	Kyiv
Ukraine Rowing Federation	Summer	Kyiv
National Rugby Federation of Ukraine	Summer	Kyiv
Sailing Federation of Ukraine	Summer	Kyiv
Ukrainian Shooting Federation	Summer	Kyiv
Ski Federation of Ukraine	Winter	Kyiv
Ukrainian Speed Skating Federation	Winter	Kyiv
Ukrainian Swimming Federation	Summer	Kyiv
Ukrainian Synchronized Swimming Federation	Summer	Kyiv
Ukrainian Table Tennis Federation	Summer	Kyiv
Ukrainian Taekwondo Federation	Summer	Kyiv
Ukrainian Tennis Federation	Summer	Kyiv
Ukrainian Triathlon Federation	Summer	Kyiv
Ukrainian Volleyball Federation	Summer	Kyiv
Ukrainian Water Polo Federation	Summer	Kyiv
Ukrainian Weightlifting Federation	Summer	Kyiv
Ukrainian Wrestling Association	Summer	Kyiv

== Performance ==
- Ukraine at the 1994 Winter Olympics
- Ukraine at the 1996 Summer Olympics
- Ukraine at the 1998 Winter Olympics
- Ukraine at the 2000 Summer Olympics
- Ukraine at the 2002 Winter Olympics
- Ukraine at the 2004 Summer Olympics
- Ukraine at the 2006 Winter Olympics
- Ukraine at the 2008 Summer Olympics
- Ukraine at the 2010 Winter Olympics
- Ukraine at the 2012 Summer Olympics
- Ukraine at the 2014 Winter Olympics
- Ukraine at the 2016 Summer Olympics
- Ukraine at the 2018 Winter Olympics

== See also ==
- Unified Sports Classification of Ukraine – a standardized sports ranking system and accepted sports terminology
- Ukraine at the Olympics
