= Volodymyr Borodiansky =

Ukrainian television manager, entrepreneur, and politician

Volodymyr Borodianskyi
- Володимир Бородянський
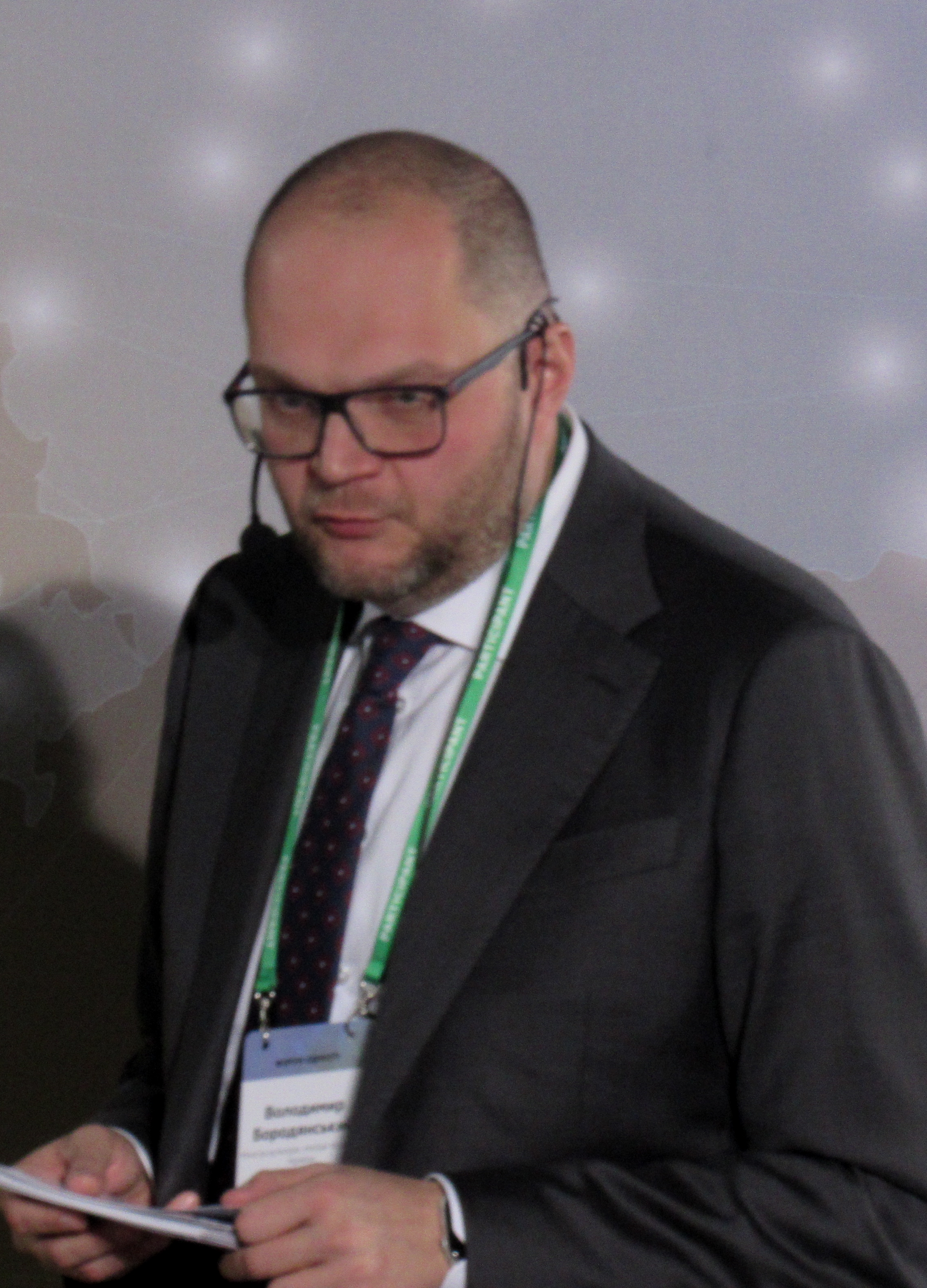
- Borodianskyi in 2019

Minister of Culture, Youth and Sports
- In office 29 August 2019 – 4 March 2020
- Prime Minister: Oleksiy Honcharuk
- Preceded by: Yevhen Nyshchuk (Culture); Ihor Zhdanov (Youth and Sports)
- Succeeded by: Vadym Gutzeit

Personal details
- Born: Volodymyr Volodymyrovych Borodianskyi; 15 January 1974 (age 52) Novyi Rozdil, Lviv Oblast, Ukrainian SSR, Soviet Union
- Education: Kyiv National Economic University
- Occupation: Television manager entrepreneur politician

Volodymyr Volodymyrovych Borodianskyi (Ukrainian: Володимир Володимирович Бородянський; born 15 January 1974) is a Ukrainian television manager, public figure, entrepreneur, and politician. He has served as Ukraine's Minister of Culture, Youth, and Sports (2019–2020), chairman of the board of STB (2004–2018), Director of StarLightMedia (2012–2018), and as Chairman of the Council for the Development of the National Cultural, Art, and Museum complex "Mystetsky Arsenal".

== Biography ==
Volodymyr Borodianskyi was born on 15 January 1974 in the town of Novyi Rozdil, Lviv region. His father, Volodymyr Efimovych Borodianskyi, worked as Deputy General Director of Novorozdilsk Production Association "Sera".

Borodianskyi graduated from Novorozdolsk Secondary School No. 2.

=== Education ===
In 1991, following his graduation from school, he enrolled at the Faculty of Economics of the Lviv Agricultural Institute in Dublyany, Lviv region. He later transferred to the Kyiv National Economic University, where he pursued studies at the Faculty of Finance and Economics, ultimately graduating in 1997 with a degree in Finance and Credit.

=== Media manager career ===
In 2004, he was elected as the chairman of the board of the STB.

From the beginning of 2012 until the end of 2018, he served as the head of the StarlightMedia media group.

On 29 July 2019, President Zelenskyy appointed Borodianskyi as Foreign Humanitarian Advisor.

In 2021, Borodianskyi joined the Board of Directors of Media Group Ukraine. His responsibilities include implementing changes to increase the share of artistic and non-educational entertainment content and ensuring its economic efficiency.

== Chairman of the board of the STB ==
Under Borodianskyi's leadership, STB strengthened its position in television by shifting its focus from being an information channel to providing cognitive-entertainment content.

In 2006, the news program Vikna Novyny received the "Golden Feather" award, followed by being named the "Favorite Teleport" in 2007. In 2008, this title was passed on to the program "Za Viknamy", and in the same year, it was succeeded by "Ukrayina maye talant".

In 2007, 2009, 2010, and 2011, Vikna Novyny won the Teletriumph Prize for being the best news program on Ukrainian television.

In 2008, STB became the leading Ukrainian television channel with a commercially attractive audience aged 14–49, according to GFK.

While working in television, Borodianskyi popularized entertainment and social television projects in Ukraine. These included "Everybody Dance!", "Ukrayina maye talant", "X-Factor", "Weighted and Happy" (adaptation of "The Biggest Loser"), "I am Shy of My Body" (adaptation of "Embarrassing Bodies"), "MasterChef Ukraine", and others.

At Borodianskyi's initiative, STB took on all expenses for organizing, conducting, and broadcasting the live national selection for Eurovision.

== StarlightMedia media group manager ==
Between 2012 and 2018, Borodianskyi served as the head of the StarlightMedia media group. Under his leadership, the group managed nationwide channels including ICTV, STB, the new channel Oce TV, M1, and M2.

In 2013, Borodianskyi proposed the "Pure Sky" initiative, aiming to legally distribute video content created by the media group through a special player.

Since 2014, StarlightMedia, under Borodianskyi's direction, has significantly increased its own serial production. With over 50 successful projects, including Lesya + Roma's, Cossacks: Absolutely False History, Variaty, Khto zverkhu, and Revizor, the company's content reaches up to 98% of the Ukrainian population through traditional broadcasts and specialized platforms.

In 2015, a new division called Starlight Entertainment emerged within the structure of the media group, focusing on theatrical productions, concerts, festivals, and other entertainment events.

In 2016, StarlightMedia achieved a record-breaking viewership share of 30%, the highest in the past three years. Leading the TV channels were STB with programs such as "X-Factor-7", "Masterchef-6", and "Weighted and Happy-6", ICTV with the Diesel-Show project, and Novyi Kanal with programs like "Supermodel in Ukrainian", "Khto zverkhu", and "Revizor".

In 2018, Volodymyr Borodianskyi introduced the "Transformation" project aimed at optimizing management processes within the media holding. The project's goal was to enhance internal management and achieve profitability for the StarlightMedia media group within five years.

=== #KinoKrayina ===
In 2015, Borodianskyi spearheaded the consolidation of the largest Ukrainian television and film holdings under the initiative group #Kinokraїna, aiming to establish a profitable and competitive sector for serial production and audience engagement in Ukraine. The group successfully advocated for the adoption of the law "On State Support of Cinematography," which came into effect in 2017.

== As Minister of Culture, Youth and Sports of Ukraine ==
V. Borodianskyi assumed office as the Minister of Culture, Youth, and Sports on 2 September 2019.

Upon taking the post, Borodianskyi emphasized the importance of producing Ukrainian-language serials, announced the establishment of the Fund for the Development of Information Space, proposed a mobility program for schoolchildren funded by the state budget to enable students to travel within Ukraine, and advocated for the creation of an electronic library.

During Borodianskyi's tenure, online courses in Ukrainian and Crimean Tatar languages were introduced for Crimean Tatars of all ages. Additionally, a dedicated program for Crimean Tatar projects and initiatives was launched within the Ukrainian Cultural Fund.

== See also ==
- Honcharuk Government
