= Heroes of Sports Year (Ukraine) =

Ukrainian sports awards

The Heroes of Sports Year (Russian: Герои спортивного года, Ukrainian: Герої спортивного року) is an annual award given from 2005 (first as Ukrainian Sport Awards) to the best athletes of year in Ukraine.

== List of winners ==
Year	Best Sportsman		Best Sportswoman		Best Coach	Best Team	Sensation of Year	Hero of the Year (People's Choice)	Ref.
Year	Athlete	Sport	Athlete	Sport	Best Coach	Best Team	Sensation of Year	Hero of the Year (People's Choice)	Ref.
2005	Rodion Luka & George Leonchuk	Sailing (sport)	Anna Bessonova	Rhythmic gymnastics	Oleh Blokhin	Ukraine national football team	Yuriy Krymarenko	Andriy Shevchenko	
2006	Ivan Heshko	Athletics (sport)	Iryna Krasnianska	Artistic gymnastics	Inna Korobchynska	Men's sabre fencing team	Ibrahim Aldatov	Oleg Lisogor	
2007	Ibrahim Aldatov	Freestyle wrestling	Anna Bessonova	Rhythmic gymnastics	Irina Deriugina	Women's sabre fencing team	Mykyta Nesterenko	Wladimir Klitschko	
2008	Vasyl Lomachenko	Boxing	Inna Osypenko-Radomska	Canoe racing	Vadim Gutzeit	Women's sabre fencing team	Nataliya Dobrynska	Anna Bessonova	
2009	Vasyl Lomachenko	Boxing	Olha Kharlan	Fencing	Anatoliy Lomachenko	Women's sabre fencing team	Georgii Zantaraia	Not awarded	
2010	Vasyl Fedoryshyn	Freestyle wrestling	Inna Osypenko-Radomska	Canoe racing	Dmytro Radomsky	Women's quadruple sculls rowing team	Yelizaveta Bryzghina	Not awarded	
2011	Oleksandr Usyk	Boxing	Victoria Tereshchuk	Modern pentathlon	Dmytro Sosnovsky	Women's 4 × 100 relay athletics team	Evhen Khytrov	Not awarded	
2012	Vasyl Lomachenko	Boxing	Yana Shemyakina	Fencing	Volodymyr Morozov	Women's quadruple sculls rowing team	Oleksiy Torokhtiy	Oleksandr Usyk	
2013	Bohdan Bondarenko	Athletics (sport)	Olena Pidhrushna	Biathlon	Artem Skorokhod	Women's sabre fencing team HC Donbass	Hanna Melnychenko	Olga Kharlan	
2014	Oleh Vernyayev	Artistic gymnastics	Olha Kharlan	Fencing	Grigoriy Shamray	Women's biathlon team	Men's quadruple sculls rowing team	Vita Semerenko; Yuriy Cheban	
2015	Zhan Beleniuk	Greco-Roman wrestling	Valentyna Semerenko	Biathlon	Gennadiy Sartynskyi	Men's epee fencing team	Pavlo Tymoshchenko	Not awarded	
2016	Oleh Vernyayev	Artistic gymnastics	Olha Kharlan	Fencing	Viacheslav Sorokin	Women's sabre fencing team	Not awarded	Ganna Rizatdinova; Yuriy Cheban	
2017	Oleksandr Khyzhniak	Boxing	Olha Kharlan	Fencing	Svitlana Saidova	Women's synchronized swimming team	Yuliya Levchenko	Not awarded	
2018	Oleksandr Abramenko	Freestyle skiing	Olena Kostevych	Shooting sports	Enver Ablaev	Olena Kostevych & Oleh Omelchuk	Alla Cherkasova	Not awarded	
2019	Zhan Beleniuk	Sport wrestling	Daria Bilodid	Judo	Svitlana Kuznetsova; Gennadiy Bilodid	Men's epee fencing team Ukraine national under-20 football team	Dmytro Pidruchnyi	Olha Kharlan	

== See also ==
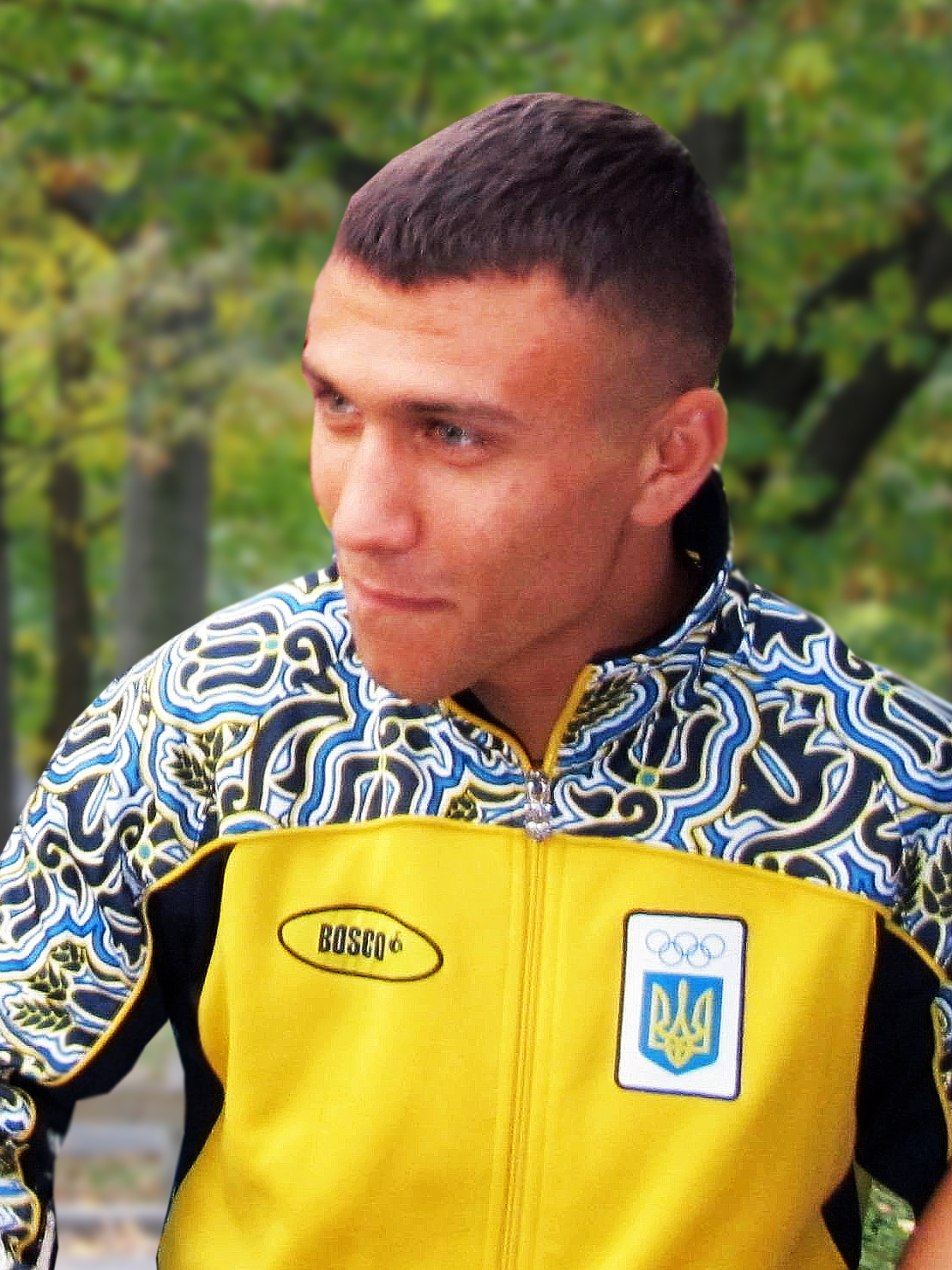
Vasyl Lomachenko, 2008, 2009 & 2012 Best Sportsman of Ukraine

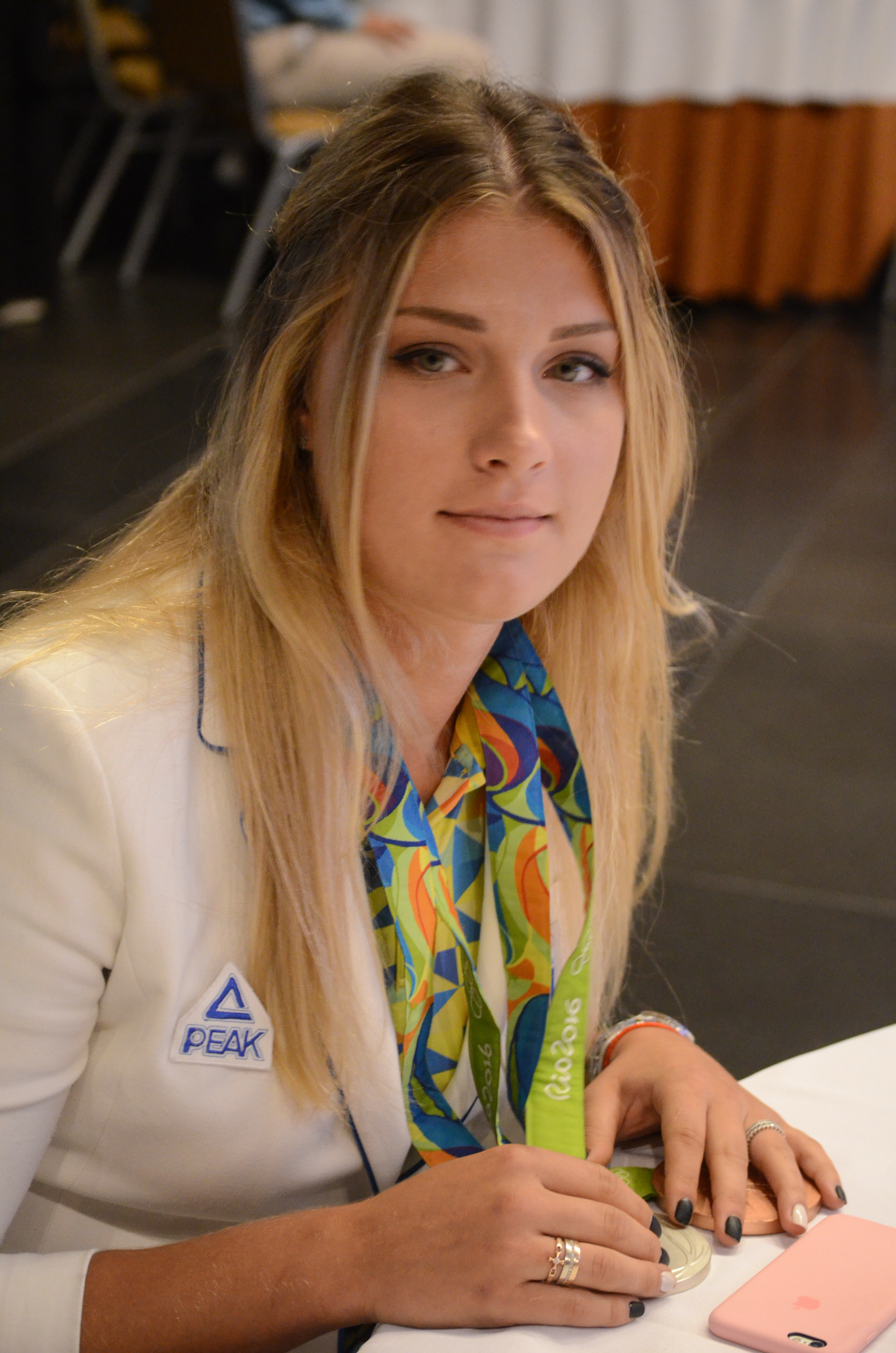
Olha Kharlan, 4-time women's world sabre world champion

- Ukrainian Footballer of the Year
