= Vadym Gutzeit =

Ukrainian fencer and minister

- Вадим Гутцайт
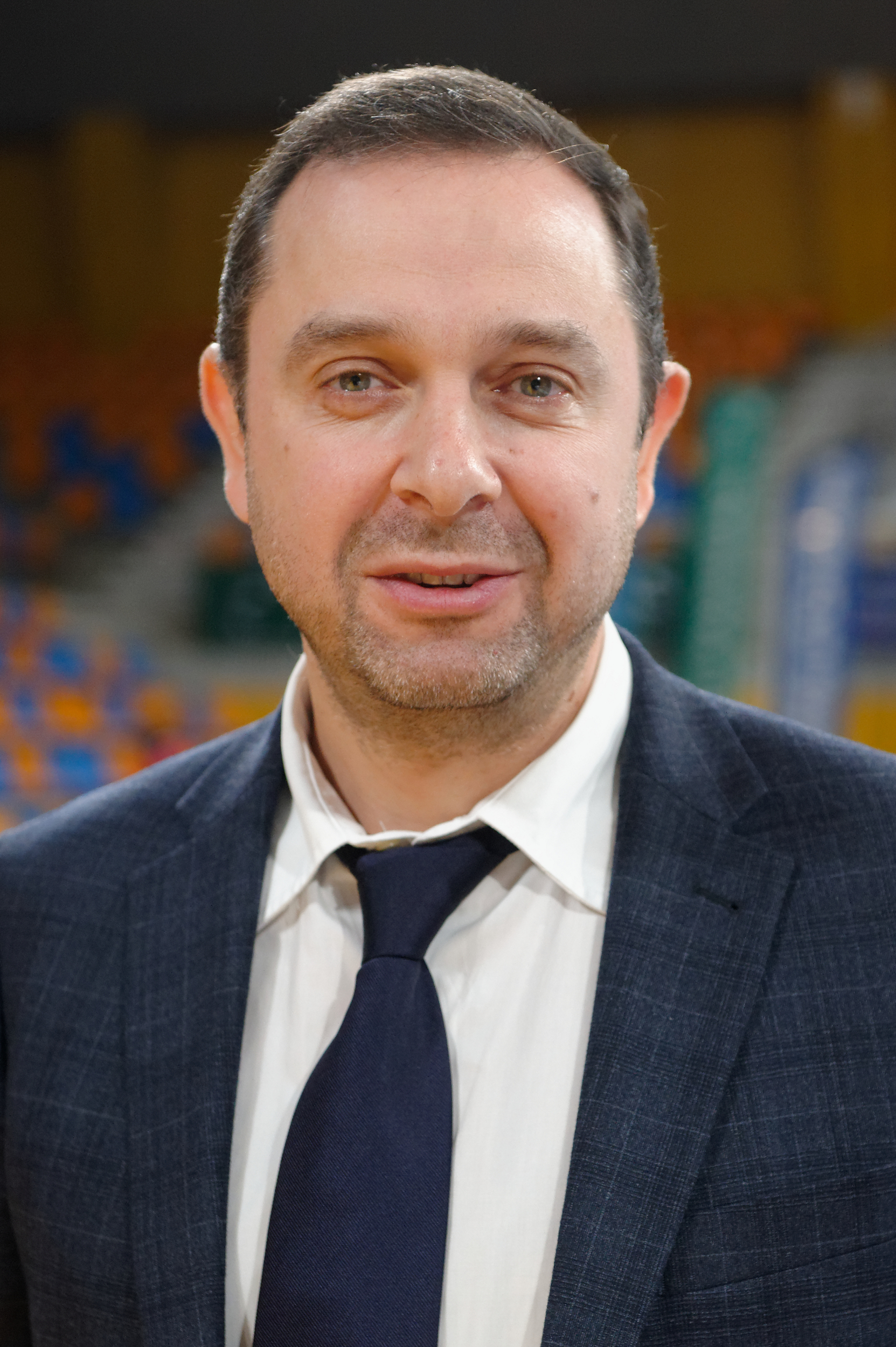
- Gutzeit in 2014

Minister of Youth and Sports
- In office 4 March 2020 – 9 November 2023
- Prime Minister: Denys Shmyhal
- Preceded by: Volodymyr Borodiansky
- Succeeded by: Matviy Bidny

President of the National Olympic Committee of Ukraine
- Incumbent
- Assumed office 17 November 2022
- Preceded by: Serhiy Bubka

Personal details
- Born: Vadym Markovych Gutzeit; 6 October 1971 (age 54) Kyiv, Ukrainian SSR, Soviet Union (now Ukraine)

Vadym Gutzeit
Fencing career
- Sport: Fencing
- Country: Ukraine
- Weapon: Sabre
- Hand: right-handed
Medal record
Men's sabre
Representing the Unified Team
Olympic Games
Gold medal – first place	1992 Barcelona	Team sabre
Representing Soviet Union
World Championships
Silver medal – second place	1991 Budapest	Team sabre
Bronze medal – third place	1991 Budapest	Individual sabre
World Juniors Championships
Gold medal – first place	1989 Athens	Individual sabre
Gold medal – first place	1990 Mödling	Individual sabre
Representing Ukraine
European Championships
Bronze medal – third place	2000 Madeira	Team sabre
Summer Universiade
Gold medal – first place	1997 Sicily	Individual sabre
Gold medal – first place	1999 Palma de Mallorca	Individual sabre
Silver medal – second place	1995 Fukuoka	Individual sabre
Bronze medal – third place	1997 Sicily	Team sabre
Maccabiah Games
Gold medal – first place	2005 Israel	Individual sabre
Gold medal – first place	2005 Israel	Team sabre
Silver medal – second place	2001 Israel	Individual sabre

Vadym Gutzeit (Ukrainian: Вадим Маркович Гутцайт, romanized: Vadym Markovych Huttsayt; also Vadym Guttsayt; born 6 October 1971) is a Ukrainian Olympic champion sabre fencer, and former Ukraine's Youth and Sport Minister, as well as the president of the Ukrainian Fencing Federation and the President of the National Olympic Committee of Ukraine.

He was world junior sabre champion in 1989 and 1990, fenced in three Olympic Games, was sabre team Olympic champion in 1992, won a bronze medal in the 1991 World Fencing Championships, and was the 2005 Maccabiah Games sabre champion. Since March 2020, Gutzeit has been Ukraine's Youth and Sport Minister. He has been an international referee for the Fédération Internationale d'Escrime (FIE) since 2002. Gutzeit was inducted into the Hall of Fame of the FIE in 2013.

== Early and personal life ==
Gutzeit was born in Kyiv into a Jewish family. In 1993, he graduated from the Kyiv State Institute of Physical Culture. In 1993–2002, he served as a major in the Armed Forces of Ukraine.

He is married to Ukrainian journalist, radio and TV presenter, Oksana Gutzeit. They have two children.

== Fencing career ==
=== Fencer ===
Gutzeit took up fencing at the age of nine. He won the Ukrainian national sabre championship when he was 15. He fenced for Dynamo (Kiev). In 1988 he became USSR Junior Sabre Champion.

Gutzeit won the gold medal in the Junior Under-20 Sabre World Fencing Championships in both 1989 and 1990. In 1991, he won a silver medal in the same event.

That year he also won an individual bronze medal, and a Unified Team silver medal, in sabre at the 1991 senior World Fencing Championships.

He competed at four Universiade competitions, winning five medals between 1991 and 1999, with gold medals in the individual sabre events in 1997 and 1999.

==== Olympic champion ====
Gutzeit is an Olympic champion, and has competed in three Olympics. He competed in the 1992 Summer Olympics in Barcelona for the Unified Team (the former Soviet Union) at the age of 20, and won a gold medal with the sabre team.

He also competed in the 1996 Summer Olympics in Atlanta, this time for Ukraine, finishing 6th in the individual sabre event after being defeated 14–15 in the quarter-finals by Russia's Stanislav Pozdnyakov, who eventually won the competition. Gutzeit took part in his third Olympiad at the 2000 Sydney Games, for Ukraine. Seeded No. 13, he lost 10–15 in the table of 16 to 1998 world champion Domonkos Ferjancsik of Hungary. In the sabre team competition, he and Ukraine finished 6th.

==== Maccabiah Games ====
Gutzeit, who is Jewish, competed for Ukraine at the 1997 Maccabiah Games in Israel. He also competed in the 2001 Maccabiah Games in Israel, and won the silver medal in individual sabre. He was defeated in the gold medal final by Sergey Sharikov of Russia. Gutzeit won the gold medal at the 2005 Maccabiah Games, reaping revenge over Sharikov of Russia, as Ukraine also won the team sabre gold medal.

=== Coach, referee, and official ===
From 2002 to 2010, Gutzeit was the head coach of Ukraine's fencing team, which won an Olympic gold medal in women's team sabre in 2008.

Gutzeit became an international referee in 2002 in all weapons for the International Fencing Federation. He has since officiated in a number of major competitions, including the 2000, 2004, 2012, and 2021 Olympics.

He was vice president of the Ukrainian Fencing Federation from 2000 to 2016, has been President of the Federation since 2017, and has been a member of the executive committee of the National Olympic Committee of Ukraine since 2004. In 2014 Gutzeit said: "I, an Olympic champion, want to appeal to all the people of Ukraine and Russia! ... I won the Olympic Games in 1992 as part of the CIS combined team .... We respected and loved each other! We were like brothers.... I ask all the politicians of the two countries! We must be friends and respect each other .... And each of us deserves to live happily in our own land."

In 2010-2020, Gutzeit was the executive director of the Ukrainian Olympic Training and Sports Center.

=== Honors ===
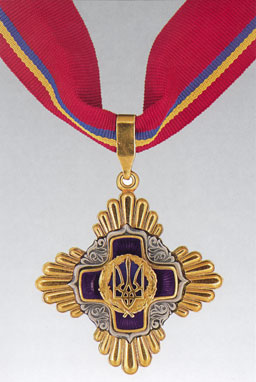
Ukrainian Order of Merit

In 1997, Gutzeit was awarded the Ukrainian Order of Merit III, in 2008 he received the award "For Merit" II, and in 2012 he received the award "For Merit" I. In 2004, he received the honorary title of "Honored Worker of Physical Culture and Sports of Ukraine." In 2016, he received the Insignia of the President of Ukraine. Gutzeit is also a Ukrainian Honored Master of Sports (1992) and Honored Coach of Ukraine.

Gutzeit was inducted into the Hall of Fame of the Fédération Internationale d'Escrime in 2013.

== Political career ==
On 26 June 2018, Gutzeit was appointed head of the Kyiv City Council's (Kyiv City State Administration) Department of Youth and Sports. He held the position until March 2020.

On 9 June 2019 Gutzeit announced he would take part in the July 2019 Ukrainian parliamentary election with the party Servant of the People. Three days later, however, he withdrew from the election.

=== Ukrainian Youth and Sports Minister ===
On 4 March 2020, Gutzeit was voted in as Ukraine's Youth and Sport Minister. At the Tokyo Olympics held in 2021, Ukrainian athletes won 19 medals (up from 11 medals in the prior Olympics), though only one of them gold. In the overall medal table, Ukraine placed 16th by total medals and 44th by golds. Speaking in 2021 of his Russian Olympic teammates with whom he competed as part of the Unified Team at the 1992 Summer Olympics, Gutzeit said: "television really zombified people there [in Russia]." In December 2021, he announced that Ukraine had decided to apply to host the 2028 Winter Youth Olympics and 2030 Winter Olympics.

On 28 February 2022, referring to the Russian invasion of Ukraine, he wrote: "No one has the right to threaten our sovereignty and freedom... Sport carries the idea of peace. But if the enemy is on our land – ... We will surely win!"

Referring to the International Olympic Committee's decision to reinstate Russian athletes as neutrals, Gutzeit pointed out in March 2023 that "neither us nor them" are satisfied with the decision, with the Ukrainians ardently demanding a blanket ban, while the Russians claim the IOC criteria is humiliating, hypocritical, and russophobic.

Also in March 2023, Gutzeit said that Russia's invasion of Ukraine had so far killed 262 Ukrainian athletes, and destroyed 363 sports facilities in Ukraine.

In 2023, Gutzeit, who had competed with Russian Olympic Committee president Stanislav Pozdnyakov when they were teammates from Ukraine and Russia on the post-Soviet Unified Team at the 1992 Olympics, said he had only contempt for Pozdnyakov. He blames Pozdnyakov for vocally supporting Russia's invasion of Ukraine. Gutzeit said: "I don’t want to talk to him. I don’t want to know him at all. He is my enemy, who supports this war, who considers it an honor for athletes to take part in the war against Ukrainians, to kill Ukrainians. Therefore, for today and forever, this person does not exist for me.”

On 8 November 2023 Gutzeit requested his dismissal as minister, so he could focus more on his work in the National Olympic Committee of Ukraine. The Verkhovna Rada (Ukraine's national parliament) fired Gutzeit as Minister of Youth and Sports the following day. 243 Ukrainian MP's voted for his dismissal.

== President of the National Olympic Committee of Ukraine ==
In November 2022, Gutzeit was elected the new President of the National Olympic Committee of Ukraine, with 84% of the vote.

== See also ==
- List of select Jewish fencers
- List of Jewish Olympic medalists
