= Fencing at the 1984 Summer Olympics – Men's sabre =

Fencing at the Olympics

Men's sabre at the Games of the XXIII Olympiad
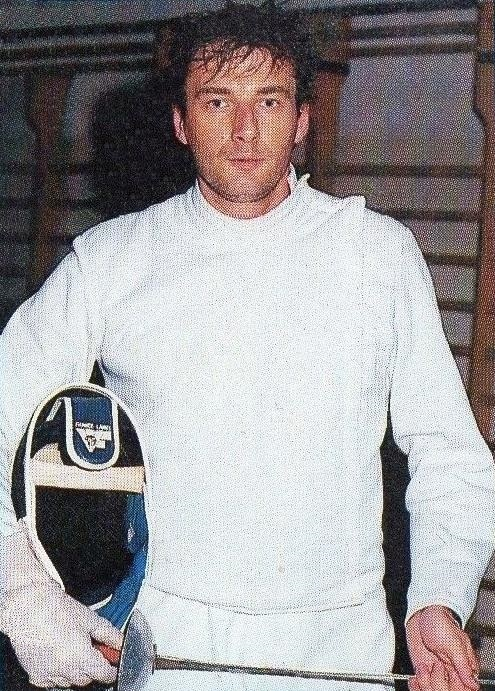
- Jean-François Lamour (1988)
- Venue: Long Beach Convention and Entertainment Center
- Dates: 3–4 August 1984
- Competitors: 33 from 16 nations

Medalists
1st place, gold medalist(s)		Jean-François Lamour	France
2nd place, silver medalist(s)		Marco Marin	Italy
3rd place, bronze medalist(s)		Peter Westbrook	United States

The men's sabre was one of eight fencing events on the fencing at the 1984 Summer Olympics programme. It was the twentieth appearance of the event. The competition was held from 3 to 4 August 1984. 33 fencers from 16 nations competed. Nations had been limited to three fencers each since 1928. The event was won by Jean-François Lamour of France, the nation's first victory in the event since 1900 (and second overall). Marco Marin of Italy took silver and Peter Westbrook of the United States took bronze. It was the first medal in the event in many Games for each of the three nations since 1964 for France, since 1960 for Italy, and since 1904 for the United States), as the men's sabre competitions had been dominated by Hungary and the Soviet Union. With both of those nations boycotting the 1984 Games, other nations had an opportunity to win medals in the sabre.

== Background ==
This was the 20th appearance of the event, which is the only fencing event to have been held at every Summer Olympics. None of the finalists from 1980 returned; five of the six were from boycotting countries and Michele Maffei (at age 38) was no longer on the Italian team. All three of the world champions since the 1980 Games had been from boycotting nations as well. The favorite was rising French star Jean-François Lamour, a seven-time French champion who had never placed better than fifth in a global championship—though this time he would be facing Italians and Romanians rather than Soviets and Hungarians.

The People's Republic of China, Monaco, and the Virgin Islands each made their debut in the men's sabre. Italy made its 18th appearance in the event, most of any nation, having missed the inaugural 1896 event and the 1904 Olympics.

== Competition format ==
The 1984 tournament used a three-phase format similar to that of 1976 and 1980, though the final phase was different.

The first phase was a multi-round round-robin pool play format; each fencer in a pool faced each other fencer in that pool once. There were three pool rounds:

- The first round had 6 pools of 5 or 6 fencers each, with the top 5 in each pool advancing.
- The second round had 6 pools of 5 fencers each, with the top 4 in each pool advancing.
- The third round had 4 pools of 6 fencers each, with the top 4 in each pool advancing.

The second phase was a truncated double-elimination tournament. Four fencers advanced to the final round through the winners brackets and four more advanced via the repechage.

The final phase was a single elimination tournament with a bronze medal match. (This was changed from a 6-man final round-robin pool in previous years.)

Bouts in the round-robin pools were to 5 touches; bouts in the double-elimination and final rounds were to 10 touches.

== Schedule ==
All times are Pacific Daylight Time (UTC-7)

Date	Time	Round
Friday, 3 August 1984	9:00	Round 1 Round 2 Round 3
Friday, 3 August 1984	9:00 20:00	Double elimination round Quarterfinals; Semifinals; Finals

== Results ==
=== Round 1 ===
==== Round 1 Pool A ====
Pos	Fencer	W	L	TF	TA	Notes	GDB	Marin	HB	FS	Marcil
1	Gianfranco Dalla Barba (ITA)	4	0	20	10	Q		5–2	5–3	5–3	5–2
2	Cornel Marin (ROU)	3	1	17	13	Q	2–5		5–3	5–3	5–2
3	Hanns Brandstätter (AUT)	1	3	13	15	Q	3–5	3–5		2–5	5–0
4	Freddy Scholz (FRG)	1	3	14	17	Q	3–5	3–5	5–2		3–5
5	Claude Marcil (CAN)	1	3	9	18	Q	2–5	2–5	0–5	5–3	

Source: Official Report, vol. 2, p. 398

==== Round 1 Pool B ====
Pos	Fencer	W	L	TF	TA	Notes	JFL	ML	JS	WR	JZ	JM
1	Jean-François Lamour (FRA)	5	0	25	8	Q		5–1	5–2	5–1	5–1	5–3
2	Mike Lofton (USA)	3	2	18	19	Q	1–5		5–3	2–5	5–2	5–4
3	Jörg Stratmann (FRG)	3	2	20	21	Q	2–5	3–5		5–4	5–3	5–4
4	Wang Ruiji (CHN)	2	3	18	19	Q	1–5	5–2	4–5		3–5	5–2
5	John Zarno (GBR)	2	3	16	21	Q	1–5	2–5	3–5	5–3		5–3
6	João Marquilhas (POR)	0	5	16	25		3–5	4–5	4–5	2–5	3–5	

Source: Official Report, vol. 2, p. 398

==== Round 1 Pool C ====
Pos	Fencer	W	L	TF	TA	Notes	AT	PW	IP	GS	OM	JK
1	Atilio Tass (ARG)	2	3	17	18	Q		3–5	3–5	1–5	5–2	5–1
2	Peter Westbrook (USA)	3	2	22	17	Q	5–3		4–5	3–5	5–4	5–0
3	Ioan Pop (ROU)	4	1	20	16	Q	5–3	5–4		0–5	5–1	5–3
4	Giovanni Scalzo (ITA)	5	0	25	7	Q	5–1	5–3	5–0		5–2	5–1
5	Olivier Martini (MON)	1	4	14	22	Q	2–5	4–5	1–5	2–5		5–2
6	James Kreglo (ISV)	0	5	7	25		1–5	0–5	3–5	1–5	2–5	

Source: Official Report, vol. 2, p. 398

==== Round 1 Pool D ====
Pos	Fencer	W	L	TF	TA	Notes	MM	HGV	LG	JMB	AG	JMC
1	Marin Mustață (ROU)	4	1	24	14	Q		5–4	5–2	4–5	5–1	5–2
2	Hervé Granger-Veyron (FRA)	4	1	24	15	Q	4–5		5–3	5–4	5–1	5–2
3	Liu Guozhen (CHN)	3	2	20	16	Q	2–5	3–5		5–3	5–3	5–0
4	Jean-Marie Banos (CAN)	3	2	22	19	Q	5–4	4–5	3–5		5–4	5–1
5	Antonio García (ESP)	1	4	14	20	Q	1–5	1–5	3–5	4–5		5–0
6	José María Casanovas (ARG)	0	5	5	25		2–5	2–5	0–5	1–5	0–5	

Source: Official Report, vol. 2, p. 398

==== Round 1 Pool E ====
Allam did not start.

Pos	Fencer	W	L	TF	TA	Notes	MM	ZB	JPB	RC	CJ	IA
1	Marco Marin (ITA)	4	0	20	9	Q		5–3	5–1	5–3	5–2	
2	Zisis Babanasis (GRE)	3	1	18	12	Q	3–5		5–2	5–1	5–4	
3	Jean-Paul Banos (CAN)	2	2	13	17	Q	1–5	2–5		5–3	5–4	
4	Richard Cohen (GBR)	1	3	12	15	Q	3–5	1–5	3–5		5–0	
5	Chen Jinchu (CHN)	0	4	10	20	Q	2–5	4–5	4–5	0–5		
–	Ibrahim Allam (EGY)	0	0	0	0							

Source: Official Report, vol. 2, p. 398

==== Round 1 Pool F ====
Ko did not start.

Pos	Fencer	W	L	TF	TA	Notes	PG	JN	MS	IS	SM	KYF
1	Pierre Guichot (FRA)	3	1	19	10	Q		4–5	5–3	5–1	5–1	
2	Jürgen Nolte (FRG)	3	1	18	17	Q	5–4		3–5	5–4	5–4	
3	Mark Slade (GBR)	2	2	13	13	Q	3–5	5–3		0–5	5–0	
4	Ildemaro Sánchez (VEN)	1	3	11	15	Q	1–5	4–5	5–0		1–5	
5	Steve Mormando (USA)	1	3	10	16	Q	1–5	4–5	0–5	5–1		
–	Ko Yin-Fai (HKG)	0	0	0	0							

Source: Official Report, vol. 2, p. 398

=== Round 2 ===
==== Round 2 Pool A ====
Pos	Fencer	W	L	TF	TA	Notes	FS	GS	PW	IS	LG
1	Freddy Scholz (FRG)	4	0	20	13	Q		5–3	5–3	5–3	5–4
2	Giovanni Scalzo (ITA)	3	1	18	11	Q	3–5		5–3	5–0	5–3
3	Peter Westbrook (USA)	2	2	16	16	Q	3–5	3–5		5–3	5–3
4	Ildemaro Sánchez (VEN)	1	3	11	16	Q	3–5	0–5	3–5		5–1
5	Liu Guozhen (CHN)	0	4	11	20		4–5	3–5	3–5	1–5	

Source: Official Report, vol. 2, p. 400

==== Round 2 Pool B ====
Pos	Fencer	W	L	TF	TA	Notes	JFL	JN	RC	SM	JMB
1	Jean-François Lamour (FRA)	4	0	20	5	Q		5–3	5–0	5–1	5–1
2	Jürgen Nolte (FRG)	2	2	17	16	Q	3–5		5–2	4–5	5–4
3	Richard Cohen (GBR)	2	2	12	13	Q	0–5	2–5		5–2	5–1
4	Steve Mormando (USA)	2	2	13	17	Q	1–5	5–4	2–5		2–3
5	Jean-Marie Banos (CAN)	0	4	9	20		1–5	4–5	1–5	3–5	

Source: Official Report, vol. 2, p. 400

==== Round 2 Pool C ====
Pos	Fencer	W	L	TF	TA	Notes	MM	HB	CMarin	ML	Marcil
1	Marco Marin (ITA)	4	0	20	9	Q		5–3	5–2	5–1	5–3
2	Hanns Brandstätter (AUT)	2	2	17	15	Q	3–5		5–3	4–5	5–2
3	Cornel Marin (ROU)	2	2	15	15	Q	2–5	3–5		5–4	5–1
4	Mike Lofton (USA)	2	2	15	17	Q	1–5	5–4	4–5		5–3
5	Claude Marcil (CAN)	0	4	9	20		3–5	2–5	1–5	3–5	

Source: Official Report, vol. 2, p. 400

==== Round 2 Pool D ====
Pos	Fencer	W	L	TF	TA	Notes	GDB	ZB	JS	JZ	AG
1	Gianfranco Dalla Barba (ITA)	4	0	20	4	Q		5–1	5–1	5–1	5–1
2	Zisis Babanasis (GRE)	3	1	16	12	Q	1–5		5–2	5–2	5–3
3	Jörg Stratmann (FRG)	2	2	13	14	Q	1–5	2–5		5–1	5–3
4	John Zarno (GBR)	1	3	9	17	Q	1–5	2–5	1–5		5–2
5	Antonio García (ESP)	0	4	9	20		1–5	3–5	3–5	2–5	

Source: Official Report, vol. 2, p. 400

==== Round 2 Pool E ====
Pos	Fencer	W	L	TF	TA	Notes	MM	PG	WR	MS	OM
1	Marin Mustață (ROU)	3	1	19	10	Q		4–5	5–3	5–1	5–1
2	Pierre Guichot (FRA)	3	1	19	13	Q	5–4		4–5	5–3	5–1
3	Wang Ruiji (CHN)	2	2	16	16	Q	3–5	5–4		3–5	5–2
4	Mark Slade (GBR)	2	2	14	17	Q	1–5	3–5	5–3		5–4
5	Olivier Martini (MON)	0	4	8	20		1–5	1–5	2–5	4–5	

Source: Official Report, vol. 2, p. 400

==== Round 2 Pool F ====
Pos	Fencer	W	L	TF	TA	Notes	HGV	IP	CJ	JPB	AT
1	Hervé Granger-Veyron (FRA)	3	1	18	13	Q		3–5	5–2	5–4	5–2
2	Ioan Pop (ROU)	3	1	19	14	Q	5–3		5–3	5–3	4–5
3	Chen Jinchu (CHN)	2	2	15	12	Q	2–5	3–5		5–0	5–2
4	Jean-Paul Banos (CAN)	1	3	12	18	Q	4–5	3–5	0–5		5–3
5	Atilio Tass (ARG)	1	3	12	19		2–5	5–4	2–5	3–5	

Source: Official Report, vol. 2, p. 400

=== Round 3 ===
==== Round 3 Pool A ====
Pos	Fencer	W	L	TF	TA	Notes	GDB	HGV	PW	IP	RC	JZ
1	Gianfranco Dalla Barba (ITA)	5	0	25	10	Q		5–3	5–2	5–1	5–3	5–1
2	Hervé Granger-Veyron (FRA)	4	1	23	19	Q	3–5		5–4	5–4	5–2	5–4
3	Peter Westbrook (USA)	3	2	21	14	Q	2–5	4–5		5–3	5–1	5–0
4	Ioan Pop (ROU)	2	3	18	21	Q	1–5	4–5	3–5		5–3	5–3
5	Richard Cohen (GBR)	1	4	14	24		3–5	2–5	1–5	3–5		5–4
6	John Zarno (GBR)	0	5	12	25		1–5	4–5	0–5	3–5	4–5	

Source: Official Report, vol. 2, p. 400

==== Round 3 Pool B ====
Pos	Fencer	W	L	TF	TA	Notes	JFL	CM	ZB	GS	JPB	JS
1	Jean-François Lamour (FRA)	5	0	25	14	Q		5–3	5–3	5–4	5–4	5–0
2	Cornel Marin (ROU)	3	2	20	15	Q	3–5		5–1	2–5	5–3	5–1
3	Zisis Babanasis (GRE)	3	2	19	17	Q	3–5	1–5		5–4	5–2	5–1
4	Giovanni Scalzo (ITA)	2	3	21	17	Q	4–5	5–2	4–5		3–5	5–0
5	Jean-Paul Banos (CAN)	1	4	18	23		4–5	3–5	2–5	5–3		4–5
6	Jörg Stratmann (FRG)	1	4	7	24		0–5	1–5	1–5	0–5	5–4	

Source: Official Report, vol. 2, p. 400

==== Round 3 Pool C ====
Pos	Fencer	W	L	TF	TA	Notes	PG	MM	CJ	JN	ML	IS
1	Pierre Guichot (FRA)	4	1	24	12	Q		5–2	5–2	4–5	5–3	5–0
2	Marco Marin (ITA)	3	2	21	16	Q	2–5		4–5	5–2	5–3	5–1
3	Chen Jinchu (CHN)	3	2	20	18	Q	2–5	5–4		3–5	5–2	5–2
4	Jürgen Nolte (FRG)	3	2	18	20	Q	5–4	2–5	5–3		1–5	5–3
5	Mike Lofton (USA)	2	3	18	19		3–5	3–5	2–5	5–1		5–3
6	Ildemaro Sánchez (VEN)	0	5	9	25		0–5	1–5	2–5	3–5	3–5	

Source: Official Report, vol. 2, p. 400

==== Round 3 Pool D ====
Pos	Fencer	W	L	TF	TA	Notes	FS	SM	MM	WR	MS	HB
1	Freddy Scholz (FRG)	4	1	22	11	Q		5–2	2–5	5–3	5–0	5–1
2	Steve Mormando (USA)	3	2	20	17	Q	2–5		5–2	3–5	5–3	5–2
3	Marin Mustață (ROU)	3	2	19	19	Q	5–2	2–5		5–4	5–3	2–5
4	Wang Ruiji (CHN)	2	3	19	22	Q	3–5	5–3	4–5		2–5	5–4
5	Mark Slade (GBR)	2	3	16	21		0–5	3–5	3–5	5–2		5–4
6	Hanns Brandstätter (AUT)	1	4	16	22		1–5	2–5	5–2	4–5	4–5	

Source: Official Report, vol. 2, p. 400

=== Double elimination rounds ===
==== Winners brackets ====
===== Winners group 1 =====
Round of 16		Round of 8
Gianfranco Dalla Barba (ITA)	10
Wang Ruiji (CHN)	4	Gianfranco Dalla Barba (ITA)	9
Peter Westbrook (USA)	10	Peter Westbrook (USA)	11
Zisis Babanasis (GRE)	3

===== Winners group 2 =====
Round of 16		Round of 8
Marco Marin (ITA)	10
Chen Jinchu (CHN)	3	Marco Marin (ITA)	11
Ioan Pop (ROU)	10	Ioan Pop (ROU)	10
Pierre Guichot (FRA)	3

===== Winners group 3 =====
Round of 16		Round of 8
Freddy Scholz (FRG)	4
Steve Mormando (USA)	10	Steve Mormando (USA)	9
Cornel Marin (ROU)	9	Hervé Granger-Veyron (FRA)	10
Hervé Granger-Veyron (FRA)	10

===== Winners group 4 =====
Round of 16		Round of 8
Marin Mustață (ROU)	5
Giovanni Scalzo (ITA)	10	Giovanni Scalzo (ITA)	5
Jürgen Nolte (FRG)	2	Jean-François Lamour (FRA)	10
Jean-François Lamour (FRA)	10

==== Losers brackets ====
===== Losers group 1 =====
Round of 4		Round of 2
Wang Ruiji (CHN)	9
Zisis Babanasis (GRE)	10	Zisis Babanasis (GRE)	4
		Giovanni Scalzo (ITA)	10

===== Losers group 2 =====
Round of 4		Round of 2
Chen Jinchu (CHN)	3
Pierre Guichot (FRA)	10	Pierre Guichot (FRA)	10
		Steve Mormando (USA)	8

===== Losers group 3 =====
Round of 4		Round of 2
Freddy Scholz (FRG)	10
Cornel Marin (ROU)	9	Freddy Scholz (FRG)	4
		Ioan Pop (ROU)	10

===== Losers group 4 =====
Round of 4		Round of 2
Marin Mustață (ROU)	10
Jürgen Nolte (FRG)	6	Marin Mustață (ROU)	11
		Gianfranco Dalla Barba (ITA)	9

=== Final round ===
Quarterfinals
Jean-François Lamour (FRA)	10
Ioan Pop (ROU)	6
Pierre Guichot (FRA)	8
Peter Westbrook (USA)	10
Hervé Granger-Veyron (FRA)	10
Marin Mustață (ROU)	8
Giovanni Scalzo (ITA)	9
Marco Marin (ITA)	11

Semifinals
Jean-François Lamour (FRA)	10
Peter Westbrook (USA)	4
Hervé Granger-Veyron (FRA)	4
Marco Marin (ITA)	10

Finals
Jean-François Lamour (FRA)	12
Marco Marin (ITA)	11
Third place
Peter Westbrook (USA)	10
Hervé Granger-Veyron (FRA)	5

== Final classification ==
Fencer	Nation
Jean-François Lamour	France
Marco Marin	Italy
Peter Westbrook	United States
Hervé Granger-Veyron	France
Pierre Guichot	France
Marin Mustață	Romania
Giovanni Scalzo	Italy
Ioan Pop	Romania
Gianfranco Dalla Barba	Italy
Freddy Scholz	West Germany
Zisis Babanasis	Greece
Steve Mormando	United States
Cornel Marin	Romania
Chen Jinchu	China
Jürgen Nolte	West Germany
Wang Ruiji	China
Mike Lofton	United States
Mark Slade	Great Britain
Jean-Paul Banos	Canada
Hanns Brandstätter	Austria
Richard Cohen	Great Britain
Jörg Stratmann	West Germany
John Zarno	Great Britain
Ildemaro Sánchez	Venezuela
Atilio Tass	Argentina
Liu Guozhen	China
Jean-Marie Banos	Canada
Claude Marcil	Canada
Antonio García	Spain
Olivier Martini	Monaco
João Marquilhas	Portugal
James Kreglo	Virgin Islands
José María Casanovas	Argentina
