= Fencing at the 1988 Summer Olympics – Men's sabre =

Fencing at the Olympics

Men's sabre at the Games of the XXIV Olympiad
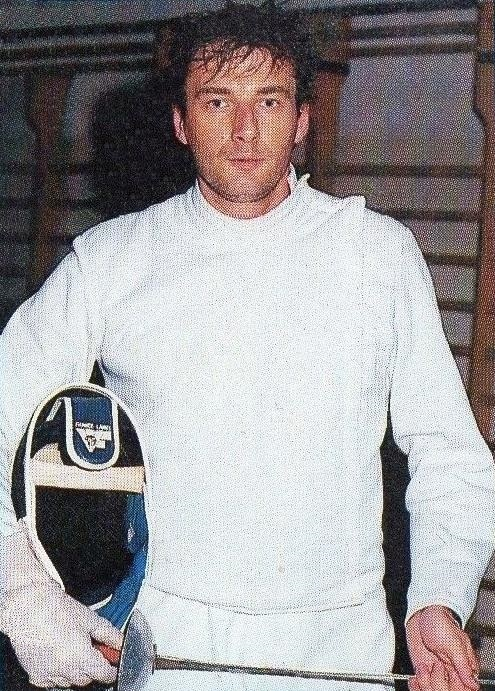
- Jean-François Lamour
- Venue: Olympic Fencing Gymnasium
- Dates: 22–23 September 1988
- Competitors: 40 from 18 nations

Medalists
1st place, gold medalist(s)		Jean-François Lamour	France
2nd place, silver medalist(s)		Janusz Olech	Poland
3rd place, bronze medalist(s)		Giovanni Scalzo	Italy

The men's sabre was one of eight fencing events on the fencing at the 1988 Summer Olympics programme. It was the twenty-first appearance of the event. The competition was held from 22 to 23 September 1988. 40 fencers from 18 nations competed. Nations had been limited to three fencers each since 1928. The event was won by defending champion Jean-François Lamour of France, the fourth man to successfully defend an Olympic title in the sabre and the 11th man overall to win multiple medals in the event. It was France's third victory in the event, matching the Soviet Union for second-most all-time (behind Hungary at 11 gold medals). Janusz Olech took silver, Poland's first medal in the event since 1968. Italian Giovanni Scalzo earned bronze.

== Background ==
This was the 21st appearance of the event, which is the only fencing event to have been held at every Summer Olympics.

Six of the quarterfinalists from 1984 returned: gold medalist Jean-François Lamour of France, silver medalist Marco Marin of Italy, bronze medalist Peter Westbrook of the United States, and quarterfinal losers Pierre Guichot of France, Giovanni Scalzo of Italy, and Ioan Pop of Romania. Lamour's 1984 gold was won amidst the Soviet-led boycott keeping out dominant powers Hungary and the Soviet Union, but Lamour had won the 1987 world championship with the Hungarians and Soviets competing; he was a serious contender to repeat.

The other two inter-Games world championships had been won by György Nébald of Hungary (1985) and Sergey Mindirgasov of the Soviet Union (1986). Also returning to Olympic competition after the boycott were 1980 bronze medalist Imre Gedővári of Hungary and finalists Vasil Etropolski and Khristo Etropolski, twins from Bulgaria.

Bolivia, Chinese Taipei, the Philippines, and South Korea each made their debut in the men's sabre. Italy made its 19th appearance in the event, most of any nation, having missed the inaugural 1896 event and the 1904 Olympics.

== Competition format ==
The 1988 tournament used a three-phase format very similar to that of 1984. Unlike the foil and épée competitions, the sabre tournament kept the size of the second phase (double elimination) round at 16 fencers (compared to expanding to 32 for foil and épée).

The first phase was a multi-round round-robin pool play format; each fencer in a pool faced each other fencer in that pool once. There were three pool rounds:

- The first round had 6 pools of 6 or 7 fencers each, with the top 5 in each pool advancing.
- The second round had 6 pools of 5 fencers each, with the top 4 in each pool advancing.
- The third round had 4 pools of 6 fencers each, with the top 4 in each pool advancing.

The second phase was a truncated double-elimination tournament. Four fencers advanced to the final round through the winners brackets and four more advanced via the repechage.

The final phase was a single elimination tournament with a bronze medal match.

Bouts in the round-robin pools were to 5 touches; bouts in the double-elimination and final rounds were to 10 touches.

== Schedule ==
All times are Korea Standard Time adjusted for daylight savings (UTC+10)

Date	Time	Round
Thursday, 22 September 1988	8:30; 13:00; 15:00	Round 1 Round 2 Round 3
Friday, 23 September 1988	14:00	Double elimination round Quarterfinals; Semifinals; Bronze medal match Final

== Results ==
=== Round 1 ===
==== Round 1 Pool A ====
Pos	Fencer	W	L	TF	TA	Notes	IB	MM	SM	WZ	ST	NM	YWS
1	Imre Bujdosó (HUN)	6	0	30	13	Q		5–2	5–2	5–4	5–2	5–1	5–2
2	Marco Marin (ITA)	4	2	26	17	Q	2–5		5–4	4–5	5–2	5–1	5–0
3	Steve Mormando (USA)	3	3	24	18	Q	2–5	4–5		5–2	3–5	5–1	5–0
4	Wang Zhiming (CHN)	3	3	22	22	Q	4–5	5–4	2–5		1–5	5–2	5–1
5	Stephan Thönnessen (FRG)	3	3	21	22	Q	2–5	2–5	5–3	5–1		2–5	5–3
6	Nikolay Marincheshki (BUL)	2	4	15	22		1–5	1–5	1–5	2–5	5–2		5–0
7	Yan Wing-Shean (TPE)	0	6	6	30		2–5	0–5	0–5	1–5	3–5	0–5	

Source: Official Report, vol. 2, p. 379

==== Round 1 Pool B ====
Pos	Fencer	W	L	TF	TA	Notes	KE	HP	PG	ZZ	JMB	ML	RA
1	Khristo Etropolski (BUL)	5	1	28	13	Q		3–5	5–1	5–4	5–0	5–3	5–0
2	Heorhiy Pohosov (URS)	5	1	28	17	Q	5–3		3–5	5–3	5–2	5–4	5–0
3	Pierre Guichot (FRA)	5	1	26	18	Q	1–5	5–3		5–1	5–4	5–2	5–3
4	Zheng Zhaokang (CHN)	3	3	23	22	Q	4–5	3–5	1–5		5–4	5–2	5–1
5	Jean-Marie Banos (CAN)	2	4	20	24	Q	0–5	2–5	4–5	4–5		5–4	5–0
6	Mike Lofton (USA)	1	5	20	25		3–5	4–5	2–5	2–5	4–5		5–0
7	Régis Avila (BRA)	0	6	4	30		0–5	0–5	3–5	1–5	0–5	0–5	

Source: Official Report, vol. 2, p. 379

==== Round 1 Pool C ====
Pos	Fencer	W	L	TF	TA	Notes	VE	IG	PD	JPB	JG	MS	PA
1	Vasil Etropolski (BUL)	6	0	30	8	Q		5–1	5–4	5–1	5–2	5–0	5–0
2	Imre Gedővári (HUN)	5	1	26	11	Q	1–5		5–3	5–2	5–1	5–0	5–0
3	Philippe Delrieu (FRA)	4	2	27	17	Q	4–5	3–5		5–1	5–1	5–3	5–2
4	Jean-Paul Banos (CAN)	3	3	19	19	Q	1–5	2–5	1–5		5–1	5–2	5–1
5	Jia Guihua (CHN)	2	4	15	27	Q	2–5	1–5	1–5	1–5		5–4	5–3
6	Mark Slade (GBR)	1	5	14	29		0–5	0–5	3–5	2–5	4–5		5–4
7	Percival Alger (PHI)	0	6	10	30		0–5	0–5	2–5	1–5	3–5	4–5	

Source: Official Report, vol. 2, p. 379

==== Round 1 Pool D ====
Pos	Fencer	W	L	TF	TA	Notes	AA	GN	JO	PW	AG	KSU	PB
1	Andrey Alshan (URS)	6	0	30	16	Q		5–2	5–4	5–4	5–2	5–2	5–2
2	György Nébald (HUN)	5	1	27	16	Q	2–5		5–1	5–3	5–3	5–1	5–3
3	Janusz Olech (POL)	4	2	25	18	Q	4–5	1–5		5–4	5–1	5–2	5–1
4	Peter Westbrook (USA)	3	3	26	22	Q	4–5	3–5	4–5		5–2	5–4	5–1
5	Antonio García (ESP)	2	4	18	23	Q	5–2	5–3	5–1	5–2		3–5	0–5
6	Kim Sang-Uk (KOR)	1	5	17	27		2–5	1–5	2–5	4–5	3–5		5–2
7	Pedro Bleyer (BOL)	0	6	9	30		2–5	3–5	1–5	1–5	0–5	2–5	

Source: Official Report, vol. 2, p. 379

==== Round 1 Pool E ====
Pos	Fencer	W	L	TF	TA	Notes	JFL	JN	GS	TP	LBN	OM
1	Jean-François Lamour (FRA)	5	0	25	11	Q		5–1	5–2	5–4	5–2	5–2
2	Jürgen Nolte (FRG)	4	1	21	14	Q	1–5		5–3	5–3	5–2	5–1
3	Giovanni Scalzo (ITA)	3	2	20	20	Q	2–5	3–5		5–4	5–4	5–2
4	Tadeusz Piguła (POL)	2	3	21	19	Q	4–5	3–5	4–5		5–3	5–1
5	Lee Byeong-Nam (KOR)	1	4	16	24	Q	2–5	2–5	4–5	3–5		5–4
6	Olivier Martini (MON)	0	5	10	25		2–5	1–5	2–5	1–5	4–5	

Source: Official Report, vol. 2, p. 379

==== Round 1 Pool F ====
Pos	Fencer	W	L	TF	TA	Notes	SM	GDB	FB	RK	WB	LUJ
1	Sergey Mindirgasov (URS)	4	1	24	9	Q		5–0	4–5	5–1	5–0	5–3
2	Gianfranco Dalla Barba (ITA)	4	1	20	12	Q	0–5		5–4	5–1	5–1	5–1
3	Felix Becker (FRG)	3	2	20	15	Q	5–4	4–5		1–5	5–0	5–1
4	Robert Kościelniakowski (POL)	3	2	17	15	Q	1–5	1–5	5–1		5–2	5–2
5	Wulfe Balk (CAN)	1	4	8	20	Q	0–5	1–5	0–5	2–5		5–0
6	Lee Uk-Jae (KOR)	0	5	7	25		3–5	1–5	1–5	2–5	0–5	

Source: Official Report, vol. 2, p. 379

=== Round 2 ===
==== Round 2 Pool A ====
Pos	Fencer	W	L	TF	TA	Notes	VE	PD	JN	TP	JMB
1	Vasil Etropolski (BUL)	4	0	20	10	Q		5–2	5–1	5–3	5–4
2	Philippe Delrieu (FRA)	2	2	13	12	Q	2–5		5–1	1–5	5–1
3	Jürgen Nolte (FRG)	2	2	12	14	Q	1–5	1–5		5–3	5–1
4	Tadeusz Piguła (POL)	1	3	13	16	Q	3–5	5–1	3–5		2–5
5	Jean-Marie Banos (CAN)	1	3	11	17		4–5	1–5	1–5	5–2	

Source: Official Report, vol. 2, p. 379

==== Round 2 Pool B ====
Pos	Fencer	W	L	TF	TA	Notes	JO	GDB	IB	ST	WZ
1	Janusz Olech (POL)	3	1	19	10	Q		5–4	4–5	5–1	5–0
2	Gianfranco Dalla Barba (ITA)	3	1	19	12	Q	4–5		5–3	5–2	5–2
3	Imre Bujdosó (HUN)	3	1	18	13	Q	5–4	3–5		5–2	5–2
4	Stephan Thönnessen (FRG)	1	3	10	15	Q	1–5	2–5	2–5		5–0
5	Wang Zhiming (CHN)	0	4	4	20		0–5	2–5	2–5	0–5	

Source: Official Report, vol. 2, p. 379

==== Round 2 Pool C ====
Pos	Fencer	W	L	TF	TA	Notes	MM	JFL	SM	JPB	AG
1	Marco Marin (ITA)	3	1	19	9	Q		4–5	5–3	5–0	5–1
2	Jean-François Lamour (FRA)	3	1	18	15	Q	5–4		3–5	5–3	5–3
3	Sergey Mindirgasov (URS)	3	1	18	16	Q	3–5	5–3		5–4	5–4
4	Jean-Paul Banos (CAN)	1	3	12	19	Q	0–5	3–5	4–5		5–4
5	Antonio García (ESP)	0	4	12	20		1–5	3–5	4–5	4–5	

Source: Official Report, vol. 2, p. 379

==== Round 2 Pool D ====
Pos	Fencer	W	L	TF	TA	Notes	AA	FB	PG	ZZ	LBN
1	Andrey Alshan (URS)	4	0	20	9	Q		5–4	5–1	5–2	5–2
2	Felix Becker (FRG)	3	1	19	12	Q	4–5		5–4	5–0	5–3
3	Pierre Guichot (FRA)	2	2	15	16	Q	1–5	4–5		5–3	5–3
4	Zheng Zhaokang (CHN)	1	3	10	16	Q	2–5	0–5	3–5		5–1
5	Lee Byeong-Nam (KOR)	0	4	9	20		2–5	3–5	3–5	1–5	

Source: Official Report, vol. 2, p. 379

==== Round 2 Pool E ====
Pos	Fencer	W	L	TF	TA	Notes	HP	IG	RK	PW	JG
1	Heorhiy Pohosov (URS)	4	0	20	12	Q		5–3	5–4	5–3	5–2
2	Imre Gedővári (HUN)	2	2	16	13	Q	3–5		3–5	5–2	5–1
3	Robert Kościelniakowski (POL)	2	2	17	17	Q	4–5	5–3		3–5	5–4
4	Peter Westbrook (USA)	2	2	15	17	Q	3–5	2–5	5–3		5–4
5	Jia Guihua (CHN)	0	4	11	20		2–5	1–5	4–5	4–5	

Source: Official Report, vol. 2, p. 379

==== Round 2 Pool F ====
Pos	Fencer	W	L	TF	TA	Notes	GN	KE	GS	SM	WB
1	György Nébald (HUN)	4	0	20	10	Q		5–3	5–4	5–3	5–0
2	Khristo Etropolski (BUL)	2	2	17	15	Q	3–5		5–1	4–5	5–4
3	Giovanni Scalzo (ITA)	2	2	15	15	Q	4–5	1–5		5–2	5–3
4	Steve Mormando (USA)	2	2	15	16	Q	3–5	5–4	2–5		5–2
5	Wulfe Balk (CAN)	0	4	9	20		0–5	4–5	3–5	2–5	

Source: Official Report, vol. 2, p. 380

=== Round 3 ===
==== Round 3 Pool A ====
Pos	Fencer	W	L	TF	TA	Notes	PG	AA	FB	GS	IB	JPB
1	Pierre Guichot (FRA)	4	1	23	15	Q		5–4	3–5	5–1	5–4	5–1
2	Andrey Alshan (URS)	3	2	22	19	Q	4–5		5–4	5–2	3–5	5–3
3	Felix Becker (FRG)	3	2	22	20	Q	5–3	4–5		3–5	5–3	5–4
4	Giovanni Scalzo (ITA)	3	2	18	20	Q	1–5	2–5	5–3		5–3	5–4
5	Imre Bujdosó (HUN)	2	3	20	21		4–5	5–3	3–5	3–5		5–3
6	Jean-Paul Banos (CAN)	0	5	15	25		1–5	3–5	4–5	4–5	3–5	

Source: Official Report, vol. 2, p. 380

==== Round 3 Pool B ====
Pos	Fencer	W	L	TF	TA	Notes	GDB	VE	SM	JFL	RK	ST
1	Gianfranco Dalla Barba (ITA)	4	1	24	20	Q		5–3	4–5	5–4	5–4	5–4
2	Vasil Etropolski (BUL)	3	2	22	18	Q	3–5		5–2	4–5	5–4	5–2
3	Steve Mormando (USA)	3	2	21	18	Q	5–4	2–5		4–5	5–2	5–2
4	Jean-François Lamour (FRA)	3	2	21	22	Q	4–5	5–4	5–4		2–5	5–4
5	Robert Kościelniakowski (POL)	2	3	20	19		4–5	4–5	2–5	5–2		5–2
6	Stephan Thönnessen (FRG)	0	5	14	25		4–5	2–5	2–5	4–5	2–5	

Source: Official Report, vol. 2, p. 380

==== Round 3 Pool C ====
Pos	Fencer	W	L	TF	TA	Notes	JO	GN	PD	JN	SM	ZZ
1	Janusz Olech (POL)	4	1	24	14	Q		5–2	5–3	4–5	5–3	5–1
2	György Nébald (HUN)	3	2	20	15	Q	2–5		5–1	3–5	5–3	5–1
3	Philippe Delrieu (FRA)	3	2	19	17	Q	3–5	1–5		5–3	5–3	5–1
4	Jürgen Nolte (FRG)	3	2	19	18	Q	5–4	5–3	3–5		1–5	5–1
5	Sergey Mindirgasov (URS)	2	3	19	16		3–5	3–5	3–5	5–1		5–0
6	Zheng Zhaokang (CHN)	0	5	4	25		1–5	1–5	1–5	1–5	0–5	

Source: Official Report, vol. 2, p. 380

==== Round 3 Pool D ====
Pos	Fencer	W	L	TF	TA	Notes	IG	MM	HP	TP	JN	KE
1	Imre Gedővári (HUN)	4	1	23	18	Q		5–4	5–2	5–3	5–4	3–5
2	Marco Marin (ITA)	3	2	23	19	Q	4–5		5–2	4–5	5–3	5–4
3	Heorhiy Pohosov (URS)	3	2	19	19	Q	2–5	2–5		5–2	5–4	5–3
4	Tadeusz Piguła (POL)	3	2	20	20	Q	3–5	5–4	2–5		5–4	5–2
5	Peter Westbrook (USA)	1	4	20	23		4–5	3–5	4–5	4–5		5–3
6	Khristo Etropolski (BUL)	1	4	17	23		5–3	4–5	3–5	2–5	3–5	

Source: Official Report, vol. 2, p. 380

=== Double elimination rounds ===
==== Winners brackets ====
===== Winners group 1 =====
Round of 16		Round of 8
Janusz Olech (POL)	10
Giovanni Scalzo (ITA)	7	Janusz Olech (POL)	7
Imre Gedővári (HUN)	6	Felix Becker (FRG)	10
Felix Becker (FRG)	10

===== Winners group 2 =====
Round of 16		Round of 8
Gianfranco Dalla Barba (ITA)	8
Philippe Delrieu (FRA)	10	Philippe Delrieu (FRA)	10
Steve Mormando (USA)	1	Andrey Alshan (URS)	6
Andrey Alshan (URS)	10

===== Winners group 3 =====
Round of 16		Round of 8
Vasil Etropolski (BUL)	9
Jürgen Nolte (FRG)	10	Jürgen Nolte (FRG)	10
Jean-François Lamour (FRA)	9	Heorhiy Pohosov (URS)	7
Heorhiy Pohosov (URS)	10

===== Winners group 4 =====
Round of 16		Round of 8
Marco Marin (ITA)	9
Pierre Guichot (FRA)	10	Pierre Guichot (FRA)	5
Tadeusz Piguła (POL)	5	György Nébald (HUN)	10
György Nébald (HUN)	10

==== Repechages ====
===== Repechage 1 =====
Round of 4		Round of 2
Giovanni Scalzo (ITA)	10
Imre Gedővári (HUN)	8	Giovanni Scalzo (ITA)	10
		Andrey Alshan (URS)	8

===== Repechage 2 =====
Round of 4		Round of 2
Gianfranco Dalla Barba (ITA)	10
Steve Mormando (USA)	7	Gianfranco Dalla Barba (ITA)	7
		Heorhiy Pohosov (URS)	10

===== Repechage 3 =====
Round of 4		Round of 2
Vasil Etropolski (BUL)	6
Jean-François Lamour (FRA)	10	Jean-François Lamour (FRA)	10
		Ioan Pop (ROU)	4

===== Repechage 4 =====
Round of 4		Round of 2
Marco Marin (ITA)	9
Tadeusz Piguła (POL)	10	Tadeusz Piguła (POL)	6
		Janusz Olech (POL)	10

=== Final round ===
Quarterfinals
György Nébald (HUN)	8
Giovanni Scalzo (ITA)	10
Janusz Olech (POL)	10
Jürgen Nolte (FRG)	7
Philippe Delrieu (FRA)	10
Heorhiy Pohosov (URS)	9
Jean-François Lamour (FRA)	10
Felix Becker (FRG)	6

Semifinals
Giovanni Scalzo (ITA)	9
Janusz Olech (POL)	10
Philippe Delrieu (FRA)	7
Jean-François Lamour (FRA)	10

Finals
Janusz Olech (POL)	4
Jean-François Lamour (FRA)	10
Third place
Giovanni Scalzo (ITA)	10
Philippe Delrieu (FRA)	2

== Final classification ==
Fencer	Nation
Jean-François Lamour	France
Janusz Olech	Poland
Giovanni Scalzo	Italy
Philippe Delrieu	France
György Nébald	Hungary
Heorhiy Pohosov	Soviet Union
Felix Becker	West Germany
Jürgen Nolte	West Germany
Andrey Alshan	Soviet Union
Gianfranco Dalla Barba	Italy
Pierre Guichot	France
Tadeusz Piguła	Poland
Vasil Etropolski	Bulgaria
Marco Marin	Italy
Imre Gedővári	Hungary
Steve Mormando	United States
Sergey Mindirgasov	Soviet Union
Robert Kościelniakowski	Poland
Imre Bujdosó	Hungary
Peter Westbrook	United States
Khristo Etropolski	Bulgaria
Jean-Paul Banos	Canada
Stephan Thönnessen	West Germany
Zheng Zhaokang	China
Jean-Marie Banos	Canada
Antonio García	Spain
Jia Guihua	China
Lee Byeong-Nam	South Korea
Wulfe Balk	Canada
Wang Zhiming	China
Nikolay Marincheshki	Bulgaria
Mike Lofton	United States
Kim Sang-Uk	South Korea
Mark Slade	Great Britain
Olivier Martini	Monaco
Lee Uk-Jae	South Korea
Percival Alger	Philippines
Pedro Bleyer	Bolivia
Yan Wing-Shean	Chinese Taipei
Régis Avila	Brazil
