= Fencing at the 1988 Summer Olympics – Men's team sabre =

Men's team sabre at the Games of the XXIV Olympiad
- Venue: Olympic Fencing Gymnasium
- Dates: September 28 – 29, 1988
- Competitors: 53 from 11 nations

Medalists
1st place, gold medalist(s)		György Nébald; Bence Szabó; Imre Bujdosó; Imre Gedővári; László Csongrádi	Hungary
2nd place, silver medalist(s)		Sergey Mindirgasov; Mikhail Burtsev; Heorhiy Pohosov; Andrey Alshan; Sergey Koryashkin	Soviet Union
3rd place, bronze medalist(s)		Giovanni Scalzo; Marco Marin; Gianfranco Dalla Barba; Ferdinando Meglio; Massimo Cavaliere	Italy

The men's team sabre was one of eight fencing events on the fencing at the 1988 Summer Olympics programme. It was the eighteenth appearance of the event. The competition was held from September 28 to 29, 1988. 53 fencers from 11 nations competed.

== Rosters ==
Bulgaria
- Khristo Etropolski
- Vasil Etropolski
- Nikolay Marincheshki
- Nikolay Mateev
- Georgi Chomakov

Canada
- Wulfe Balk
- Jean-Marie Banos
- Jean-Paul Banos
- Bruno Deschênes
- Tony Plourde

China
- Jia Guihua
- Wang Ruiji
- Wang Zhiming
- Zheng Zhaokang

France
- Philippe Delrieu
- Franck Ducheix
- Pierre Guichot
- Jean-François Lamour

Hungary
- György Nébald
- Bence Szabó
- Imre Bujdosó
- Imre Gedővári
- László Csongrádi

Italy
- Giovanni Scalzo
- Marco Marin
- Gianfranco Dalla Barba
- Ferdinando Meglio
- Massimo Cavaliere

Poland
- Marek Gniewkowski
- Robert Kościelniakowski
- Andrzej Kostrzewa
- Janusz Olech
- Tadeusz Piguła

South Korea
- Kim Sang-Uk
- Lee Byeong-Nam
- Lee Hyo-Geun
- Lee Hyeon-Su
- Lee Uk-Jae

Soviet Union
- Sergey Mindirgasov
- Mikhail Burtsev
- Heorhiy Pohosov
- Andrey Alshan
- Sergey Koryazhkin

United States
- Bob Cottingham
- Paul Friedberg
- Mike Lofton
- Steve Mormando
- Peter Westbrook

West Germany
- Felix Becker
- Jörg Kempenich
- Jürgen Nolte
- Dieter Schneider
- Stephan Thönnessen

== Results ==
=== Round 1 ===
==== Round 1 Pool A ====
Hungary and France each defeated Bulgaria, 9–2 and 9–3 respectively. The winners then faced off, with Hungary winning 9–4.

Pos	Team	W	L	BW	BL	Qual.	HUN	FRA	BUL
1	Hungary	2	0	18	6	QQ		9–4	9–2
2	France	1	1	13	12	QQ	4–9		9–3
3	Bulgaria	0	2	5	18		2–9	3–9	

Source: Official Report, vol. 2, p. 394

==== Round 1 Pool B ====
In the first set of matches, Italy beat South Korea 9–2 and West Germany defeated the United States 9–3. The second set saw the winners both win again (securing advancement) and the losers both lose again (resulting in elimination), as Italy prevailed over the United States 9–4 and West Germany won against South Korea 9–1. Finally, Italy took the top spot in the group by beating West Germany 9–5 while South Korea finished last after losing to the United States 9–5.

Pos	Team	W	L	BW	BL	Qual.	ITA	FRG	USA	KOR
1	Italy	3	0	27	11	QS		9–5	9–4	9–2
2	West Germany	2	1	23	13	QQ	5–9		9–3	9–1
3	United States	1	2	16	23		4–9	3–9		9–5
4	South Korea	0	3	8	27		2–9	1–9	5–9	

Source: Official Report, vol. 2, p. 394

==== Round 1 Pool C ====
In the first set of matches, the Soviet Union beat Canada 9–1 and Poland defeated China 9–1. The second set saw the winners both win again (securing advancement) and the losers both lose again (resulting in elimination), as the Soviet Union prevailed over China 9–1 and Poland won against Canada 9–3. Finally, the Soviet Union took the top spot in the group by beating Poland 9–7 while China finished last after losing to Canada 9–7.

Pos	Team	W	L	BW	BL	Qual.	URS	POL	CAN	CHN
1	Soviet Union	3	0	27	9	QS		9–7	9–1	9–1
2	Poland	2	1	25	13	QQ	7–9		9–3	9–1
3	Canada	1	2	13	25		1–9	3–9		9–7
4	China	0	3	9	27		1–9	1–9	7–9	

Source: Official Report, vol. 2, pp. 394–95

=== Elimination rounds ===
Quarterfinals
A1	Hungary	8
C2	Poland	8
B1	Italy
Bye
A2	France	9
B2	West Germany	5
C1	Soviet Union
Bye

Semifinals
A1	Hungary	9
B1	Italy	5
A2	France	7
C1	Soviet Union	9

Final
A1	Hungary	8
C1	Soviet Union	8
Third place
B1	Italy	8
A2	France	8

Fifth Place
C2	Poland	9
B2	West Germany	4
