= Fencing at the 1984 Summer Olympics – Men's team sabre =

Men's team sabre at the Games of the XXIII Olympiad
- Venue: Long Beach Convention Center
- Dates: 8 – 9 August 1984
- Competitors: 40 from 8 nations

Medalists
1st place, gold medalist(s)		Marco Marin; Gianfranco Dalla Barba; Giovanni Scalzo; Ferdinando Meglio; Angelo Arcidiacono	Italy
2nd place, silver medalist(s)		Jean-François Lamour; Pierre Guichot; Hervé Granger-Veyron; Philippe Delrieu; Franck Ducheix	France
3rd place, bronze medalist(s)		Marin Mustață; Ioan Pop; Alexandru Chiculiţă; Cornel Marin; Vilmoș Szabo	Romania

The men's team sabre was one of eight fencing events on the fencing at the 1984 Summer Olympics programme. It was the seventeenth appearance of the event. The competition was held from 8 to 9 August 1984. 40 fencers from 8 nations competed.

== Rosters ==
Canada
- Jean-Marie Banos
- Jean-Paul Banos
- Marc Lavoie
- Claude Marcil
- Eli Sukunda

China
- Wang Ruiji
- Chen Jinchu
- Yang Shisen
- Liu Guozhen
- Liu Yunhong

France
- Jean-François Lamour
- Pierre Guichot
- Hervé Granger-Veyron
- Philippe Delrieu
- Franck Ducheix

Great Britain
- Richard Cohen
- Paul Klenerman
- Jim Philbin
- Mark Slade
- John Zarno

Italy
- Marco Marin
- Gianfranco Dalla Barba
- Giovanni Scalzo
- Ferdinando Meglio
- Angelo Arcidiacono

Romania
- Marin Mustață
- Ioan Pop
- Alexandru Chiculiţă
- Cornel Marin
- Vilmoș Szabo

United States
- Peter Westbrook
- Steve Mormando
- Phil Reilly
- Joel Glucksman
- Mike Lofton

West Germany
- Dieter Schneider
- Jürgen Nolte
- Freddy Scholz
- Jörg Stratmann
- Jörg Volkmann

== Results ==
=== Round 1 ===
==== Round 1 Pool A ====
In the first set of matches, France defeated Canada 9–5 and West Germany beat the United States 9–4. The second set saw the winners both win again (securing advancement, with a head-to-head match determining the bye) and the loser both lose again (setting up a head-to-head match for the last advancement place), as France prevailed over the United States 9–4 and West Germany won against Canada 9–6. Finally, France took the top spot in the group and the bye by beating West Germany 9–2 while the United States secured the last advancement spot by beating Canada 9–1.

Pos	Team	W	L	BW	BL	Qual.	FRA	FRG	USA	CAN
1	France	3	0	27	11	QS		9–2	9–4	9–5
2	West Germany	2	1	20	19	QQ	2–9		9–4	9–6
3	United States	1	2	17	19	QQ	4–9	4–9		9–1
4	Canada	0	3	12	27		5–9	6–9	1–9	

Source: Official Report, vol. 2, pp. 409–10

==== Round 1 Pool B ====
In the first set of matches, Italy defeated China 9–4 and Romania beat Great Britain 9–4. The second set saw the winners both win again (securing advancement, with a head-to-head match determining the bye) and the loser both lose again (setting up a head-to-head match for the last advancement place), as Italy prevailed over Great Britain 9–0 and Romania won against China 9–4. Finally, Italy took the top spot in the group and the bye by beating West Germany 9–3 while China secured the last advancement spot by beating Great Britain 8–6.

Pos	Team	W	L	BW	BL	Qual.	ITA	ROU	CHN	GBR
1	Italy	3	0	27	7	QS		9–3	9–4	9–0
2	Romania	2	1	21	17	QQ	3–9		9–4	9–4
3	China	1	2	16	24	QQ	4–9	4–9		8–6
4	Great Britain	0	3	10	26		0–9	4–9	6–8	

Source: Official Report, vol. 2, pp. 410–11

=== Elimination rounds ===
Quarterfinals
A3	United States	3
B2	Romania	9
A1	France
Bye
B3	China	3
A2	West Germany	9
B1	Italy
Bye

Semifinals
B2	Romania	4
A1	France	9
A2	West Germany	3
B1	Italy	9

Final
A1	France	3
B1	Italy	9
Third place
B2	Romania	8
A2	West Germany	7

Fifth Place
A3	United States	7
B3	China	9
