= Portugal at the 1984 Summer Olympics =

- IOC code: POR
- NOC: Olympic Committee of Portugal

in Los Angeles
- Competitors: 38 (29 men and 9 women) in 11 sports
- Flag bearer: António Roquete (Judo)
- Officials: 22
- Medals Ranked 23rd: Gold 1 Silver 0 Bronze 2 Total 3

Summer Olympics appearances (overview)
- 1912; 1920; 1924; 1928; 1932; 1936; 1948; 1952; 1956; 1960; 1964; 1968; 1972; 1976; 1980; 1984; 1988; 1992; 1996; 2000; 2004; 2008; 2012; 2016; 2020; 2024

Portugal competed at the 1984 Summer Olympics in Los Angeles, United States.

A delegation of thirty eight competitors participated in eleven sports, bringing home a total of three medals – a feat only repeated 20 years later, in Athens – including Portugal's first ever Olympic gold medal, through Carlos Lopes in the marathon. Rosa Mota, future marathon olympic champion, was the bronze medalist of this event, who appeared for the first time in the Olympics.

Portugal made its debut in the Olympic archery as well as in the diving, with Joana Figueiredo as the first Portuguese Olympic diver. Female competitors were also present at the first rhythmic gymnastics events in an Olympiad.

== Medalists ==
Medal	Name	Sport	Event	Date
Gold	Carlos Lopes	Athletics	Men's marathon	12 August
Bronze	Rosa Mota	Athletics	Women's marathon	5 August
Bronze	António Leitão	Athletics	Men's 5000 metres	11 August

== Archery ==
Men's Competition:

- Rui Santos — 2324 pts (→ 51st)

Distance	90m	70m	50m	30m	Total
Round 1	248	287	304	334	1173
Round 2	240	290	291	330	1151
Total	488	577	595	664	2324

== Athletics ==
Men's Events

100m:

- Luís Barroso

- Round 1 (heat 8) — 10.76 (→ 4th, did not advance)

200m:

- Luís Barroso

- Round 1 (heat 7) — 22.03 (→ 6th, did not advance)

5,000m:

- Ezequiel Canário

- Round 1 (heat 1) — 13:43.28 (→ 1st)
- Semi-final (heat 2) — 13:32.64 (→ 9th, advanced as 3rd fastest loser)
- Final — 13:26.50 (→ 9th)

- João Campos

- Round 1 (heat 3) — 13:46.27 (→ 5th)
- Semi-final (heat 2) — 13:34.46 (→ 10th, did not advance)

- António Leitão

- Round 1 (heat 4) — 13:51.33 (→ 1st)
- Semi-final (heat 1) — 13:39.76 (→ 2nd)
- Final — 13:09.20 (→ Bronze Medal)

10,000m:

- Fernando Mamede

- Round 1 (heat 1) — 28:21.87 (→ 1st)
- Final — did not finish

Marathon:

- Carlos Lopes — 2:09:21 OR (→ Gold Medal)
- Cidálio Caetano — did not finish
- Delfim Moreira — did not finish

20 km Walk:

- José Pinto — 1:30:57 (→ 25th)

50 km Walk:

- José Pinto — 4:04:42 (→ 8th)

Women's Events

800m:

- Maria Machado

- Round 1 (heat 4) — 2:05.74 (→ 5th, did not advance)

3000m:

- Aurora Cunha

- Round 1 (heat 1) — 8:46.38 (→ 4th, advanced as 2nd fastest loser)
- Final — 8:46.37 (→ 6th)

- Maria Machado

- Round 1 (heat 2) — 9:01.77 (→ 4th, did not advance)

- Rosa Mota

- Round 1 (heat 3) — did not finish

Marathon:

- Conceição Ferreira — 2:50:58 (→ 39th)
- Rita Borralho — 2:50:58 (→ 38th)
- Rosa Mota — 2:26:57 (→ Bronze Medal)

== Diving ==
Women's 3m Springboard:

- Joana Figueiredo

Preliminary — 374,07 pts (→ 22nd, did not advance)

Dive	1	2	3	4	5	6	7	8	9	10	Total
Coef.	1.5	1.9	2.0	1.7	2.4	2.4	2.8	2.8	2.1	2.5	Total
Pts	32,40	35,34	40,80	35,15	43,92	46,80	24,36	27,72	41,58	48,00	374,07

== Fencing ==
One fencer represented Portugal in 1984

Men's sabre

- João Marquilhas — 31st

- Round 1 (Pool C) — 5 matches, 0 victories (→ 6th, did not advance)

1. Jorg Stratmann (FRG) (→ lost 5:4)
2. John Zarno (GBR) (→ lost 5:3)
3. Michael Lofton (USA) (→ lost 5:4)
4. Ruiji Wang (CHN) (→ lost 5:2)
5. Jean François Lamour (FRA) (→ lost 5:3)

== Gymnastics ==
Individual All-Round Competition:

- Margarida Carmo — 54,575 pts (→ 18th)

Hoop	Ball	Clubs	Ribbon	Results	Prelim.
9,15	9,15	9,15	9,00	36,45	18,125
Total (results + prelim.)				54,575	

- Maria João Falcão — 35,90 pts (→ 22nd)

Hoop	Ball	Clubs	Ribbon	Results
9,05	9,00	9,20	8,65	35,90
Total				35,90

== Judo ==
Men's Extra Lightweight (–60 kg):

- João Neves

Pool B
- Round 1 — Shinji Hosokawa (JPN) (→ lost by ippon)
- Repêchage — Luís Shinoara (BRA) (→ lost by default, did not advance)

Men's Half Lightweight (–65 kg):

- Rui Rosa

Pool A
- Round 1 — Bye
- Round 2 — Stephen Gawthorpe (GBR) (→ lost by ippon, did not advance)

Men's Lightweight (–71 kg):

- Hugo d'Assunção

Pool B
- Round 1 — Federico Vixcarra (MEX) (→ lost by waza-ari, did not advance)

Men's Half Middleweight (–76 kg):

- António Roquete Andrade

Pool A
- Round 1 — Javier Condor (CRC) (→ won by ippon)
- Round 2 — Abdoulaye Diallo (GUI) (→ won by ippon)
- Round 3 — Suheyl Yesilnur (TUR) (→ lost by koka, did not advance)

== Modern pentathlon ==
Men's Individual Competition:

- Luís Monteiro — 4332 pts (→ 43rd)

Event	Riding	Fencing	Swimming	Shooting	Cross-country	Total
Pts	1070	472	1016	868	906	4332

- Manuel Barroso — 4085 pts (→ 49th)

Event	Riding	Fencing	Swimming	Shooting	Cross-country	Total
Pts	818	670	1200	348	1057	4085

- Roberto Durão — 4321 pts (→ 44th)

Event	Riding	Fencing	Swimming	Shooting	Cross-country	Total
Pts	918	736	904	956	807	4321

Men's Team Competition:

- Luís Monteiro, Manuel Barroso and Roberto Durão — 12738 pts (→ 16th)

Event	Riding	Fencing	Swimming	Shooting	Cross-country	Total
Pts	2806	1878	3120	2164	2770	12738

== Sailing ==
Star:

- António Correia and Henrique Anjos — 128 pts (→ 17th)

Race	1	2	3	4	5	6	7	Total	Net
Place	13th	~~19th~~	15th	18th	14th	17th	16th	Total	Net
Pts	19	~~25~~	21	24	20	23	22	153	128

Windglider:

- José Monteiro — 152 pts (→ 22nd)

Race	1	2	3	4	5	6	7	Total	Net
Place	18th	23rd	25th	~~26th~~	17th	23rd	13th	Total	Net
Pts	24	29	31	~~32~~	23	29	19	184	152

== Shooting ==
Men's 25m Rapid Fire Pistol:

- Francisco Neto — 586 hits (→ 20th)

Time (secs)	Stage 1				Stage 2				Total
Time (secs)	1	2	1+2	Sum (1+2)	1	2	1+2	Sum (1+2)	Total
8	49	49	98	294	49	49	98	292	586
6	50	50	100	294	49	49	98	292	586
4	47	49	96	294	47	49	96	292	586

- José Pena — 571 hits (→ 42nd)

Time (secs)	Stage 1				Stage 2				Total
Time (secs)	1	2	1+2	Sum (1+2)	1	2	1+2	Sum (1+2)	Total
8	50	49	99	287	50	49	99	284	571
6	49	49	98	287	47	48	95	284	571
4	46	44	90	287	46	44	90	284	571

Men's 50m Pistol:

- José Pena — 533 hits (→ 39th)

Round	1	2	3	4	5	6	Total
Hits	90	87	87	87	95	87	533

Men's Trap:

- José Faria — 179 hits (→ 28th)

Round	1	2	3	4	5	6	7	8	Total
Hits	24	21	24	22	24	20	23	21	179

Women's 25m Pistol:

- Maria Chitas — 572 hits (→ 15th)

Round	1	2	3	4	5	6	Total
Hits	92	97	94	96	97	96	572

== Swimming ==
Men's 100m Breaststroke:

- Alexandre Yokochi

- Heats (heat 4) — 1:07.80 (→ 5th, did not advance)

Men's 200m Breaststroke:

- Alexandre Yokochi

- Heats (heat 2) — 2:19.76 (→ 2nd)
- Final A — 2:20.69 (→ 7th)

Men's 100m Butterfly:

- João Santos

- Heats (heat 4) — 58.17 (→ 6th, did not advance)

Men's 200m Butterfly:

- João Santos

- Heats (heat 5) — 2:04.72 (→ 5th, did not advance)

== Weightlifting ==
Men's Flyweight (–52 kg):

- Raul Diniz

Group B — 0,0 kg (→ no classification)

Event	Attempt			Result
Event	1	2	3	Result
Snatch	82,5	~~87,5~~	~~87,5~~	82,5
Clean & Jerk	~~115,0~~	~~115,0~~	~~115,0~~	0,0
Total				0,0

Men's Middleweight (–75 kg):

- Jorge Soares

Group B — withdraw

Men's Middle Heavyweight (–90 kg):

- Francisco Coelho

Group B — 340,0 kg (→ 13th)

Event	Attempt			Result
Event	1	2	3	Result
Snatch	~~150,0~~	150,0	~~160,0~~	160,0
Clean & Jerk	~~190,0~~	190,0	~~195,0~~	190,0
Total				340,0

== Officials ==
- José Vicente de Moura (chief of mission)

== Notes ==
- Los Angeles Olympic Organizing Committee (1985). Official Report of the Games of the XXIII Olympiad Los Angeles, 1984 - Volume 1: Organization and planning (Retrieved on November 9, 2006)
- Los Angeles Olympic Organizing Committee (1985). Official Report of the Games of the XXIII Olympiad Los Angeles, 1984 - Volume 2: Competition summary and results (Retrieved on November 9–10, 2006)
- International Olympic Committee – Olympic medal winners database
