= Italy at the 1988 Summer Olympics =

- IOC code: ITA
- NOC: Italian National Olympic Committee

in Seoul
- Competitors: 253 (212 men, 41 women) in 23 sports
- Flag bearer: Pietro Mennea
- Medals Ranked 10th: Gold 6 Silver 4 Bronze 4 Total 14

Summer Olympics appearances (overview)
- 1896; 1900; 1904; 1908; 1912; 1920; 1924; 1928; 1932; 1936; 1948; 1952; 1956; 1960; 1964; 1968; 1972; 1976; 1980; 1984; 1988; 1992; 1996; 2000; 2004; 2008; 2012; 2016; 2020; 2024; 2028

Other related appearances
- 1906 Intercalated Games

Italy competed at the 1988 Summer Olympics in Seoul, South Korea. 253 competitors, 212 men and 41 women, took part in 140 events in 23 sports.

== Medalists ==
Medal	Name	Sport	Event	Date
Gold	Vincenzo Maenza	Wrestling	Men's Greco-Roman 48 kg	20 September
Gold	Stefano Cerioni	Fencing	Men's foil	21 September
Gold	Carmine Abbagnale; Giuseppe Abbagnale; Giuseppe Di Capua	Rowing	Men's coxed pair	25 September
Gold	Agostino Abbagnale; Gianluca Farina; Piero Poli; Davide Tizzano	Rowing	Men's quadruple sculls	25 September
Gold	Giovanni Parisi	Boxing	Featherweight	2 October
Gold	Gelindo Bordin	Athletics	Men's marathon	2 October
Silver	Carlo Massullo	Modern pentathlon	Men's individual	22 September
Silver	Daniele Masala; Carlo Massullo; Gianluca Tiberti	Modern pentathlon	Men's team	22 September
Silver	Salvatore Antibo	Athletics	Men's 10,000 metres	26 September
Silver	Francesca Bortolozzi; Annapia Gandolfi; Lucia Traversa; Dorina Vaccaroni; Margherita Zalaffi	Fencing	Women's team foil	28 September
Bronze	Stefano Battistelli	Swimming	Men's 400 metre individual medley	21 September
Bronze	Giovanni Scalzo	Fencing	Men's sabre	23 September
Bronze	Maurizio Damilano	Athletics	Men's 20 kilometres walk	23 September
Bronze	Massimo Cavaliere; Gianfranco Dalla Barba; Marco Marin; Ferdinando Meglio; Giovanni Scalzo	Fencing	Men's team sabre	29 September

== Competitors ==
The following is the list of number of competitors in the Games.

Sport	Men	Women	Total
Archery	3	0	3
Athletics	27	11	38
Boxing	7	–	7
Canoeing	5	0	5
Cycling	14	4	18
Diving	4	0	4
Equestrian	4	1	5
Fencing	15	5	20
Football	18	–	18
Gymnastics	6	5	11
Judo	4	–	4
Modern pentathlon	3	–	3
Rowing	27	0	27
Sailing	13	2	15
Shooting	11	2	13
Swimming	12	9	21
Table tennis	1	0	1
Tennis	3	2	5
Volleyball	12	0	12
Water polo	13	–	13
Weightlifting	6	–	6
Wrestling	4	–	4
Total	212	41	253

== Archery ==
Giancarlo Ferrari, competing in his fifth Olympic archery contest, dropped to 33rd place in the field. Fellow veteran Ilario Di Buò advanced to the quarterfinal, nearly missing a semifinal berth. The Italians also just missed the cutoff for the final by one ranking in the team round.

Men's Individual Competition:

- Ilario Di Buò – Quarterfinal (→ 13th place)
- Andrea Parenti – Preliminary Round (→ 28th place)
- Giancarlo Ferrari – Preliminary Round (→ 33rd place)

Men's Team Competition:

- Di Buo, Parenti, and Ferrari – Semifinal (→ 9th place)

== Athletics ==
Men's 10,000 metres

- Salvatore Antibo

- First Round — 28:09.35
- Final — 27:23.55 (→ Silver Medal)

- Alberto Cova

- First Round — 28:43.84 (→ did not advance)

Men's Marathon

- Gelindo Bordin

- Final — 2"10:32 (→ Gold Medal)

- Orlando Pizzolato

- Final — 2"15:20 (→ 16th place)

- Gianni Poli

- Final — 2"16:07 (→ 19th place)

Men's 3,000 m Steeplechase

- Alessandro Lambruschini

1. Heat — 8:32.59
2. Semi Final — 8:16.92
3. Final — 8:12.17 (→ 4th place)

- Francesco Panetta

- Heat — 8:29.75
- Semi Final — 8:17.23
- Final — 8:17.79 (→ 9th place)

Men's Hammer Throw

- Lucio Serrani

- Qualifying Heat — 70.50m (→ did not advance)

Men's Shot Put

- Alessandro Andrei

- Qualifying Heat – 20.18m
- Final – 20.36m (→ 7th place)

Men's Long Jump

- Giovanni Evangelisti

- Qualification — 7.81m
- Final — 8.08m (→ 4th place)

Men's 20 km Walk

- Maurizio Damilano

- Final — 1:20:14 (→ Bronze Medal)

- Giovanni De Benedictis

- Final — 1:20:14 (→ 6th place)

- Carlo Mattioli

- Final — 1:22:58 (→ 19th place)

Men's 50 km Walk

- Raffaello Ducceschi

- Final — 3'45:43 (→ 8th place)

- Giovanni Perricelli

- Final — 3'47:14 (→ 11th place)

- Sandro Bellucci

- Final — 4'04:56 (→ 32nd place)

Women's Marathon

- Laura Fogli

- Final — 2"27.49 (→ 6th place)

- Maria Curatolo

- Final — 2"30.14 (→ 8th place)

- Antonella Bizioli

- Final — 2"34.38 (→ 23rd place)

== Boxing ==
Men's Flyweight (– 51 kg)

- Andrea Mannai

- First Round — Lost to Arthur Johnson (USA), 0:5

Men's Featherweight

- Giovanni Parisi

Men's Lightweight

- Giorgio Campanella

Men's Light-Middleweight

- Vincenzo Nardiello

Men's Middleweight

- Michele Mastrodonato

Men's Light-Heavyweight

- Andrea Magi

Men's Heavyweight

- Luigi Gaudiano

== Cycling ==
Eighteen cyclists, fourteen men and four women, represented Italy in 1988.

Men's road race

- Roberto Pelliconi
- Fabrizio Bontempi
- Gianluca Bortolami

Men's team time trial

- Roberto Maggioni
- Eros Poli
- Mario Scirea
- Flavio Vanzella

Men's sprint

- Andrea Faccini

Men's individual pursuit

- Ivan Beltrami

Men's team pursuit

- Ivan Beltrami
- Gianpaolo Grisandi
- David Solari
- Fabrizio Trezzi
- Fabio Baldato

Men's points race

- Giovanni Lombardi

Women's road race

- Imelda Chiappa — 2:00:52 (→ 15th place)
- Maria Canins — 2:00:52 (→ 32nd place)
- Roberta Bonanomi — 2:00:52 (→ 45th place)

Women's sprint

- Elisabetta Fanton

== Diving ==
Men

Athlete	Event	Preliminary		Final	
Athlete	Event	Points	Rank	Points	Rank
Aleksandr Portnov	3 m springboard	553.74	13	Did not advance	
Piero Italiani	3 m springboard	542.67	16	Did not advance	
Domenico Rinaldi	10 m platform	476.01	16	Did not advance	
Oscar Bertone	10 m platform	471.24	17	Did not advance	

== Fencing ==
20 fencers, 15 men and 5 women, represented Italy in 1988.

Men's foil

- Stefano Cerioni
- Mauro Numa
- Andrea Borella

Men's team foil

- Andrea Borella, Stefano Cerioni, Federico Cervi, Andrea Cipressa, Mauro Numa

Men's épée

- Sandro Cuomo
- Stefano Pantano
- Angelo Mazzoni

Men's team épée

- Stefano Bellone, Andrea Bermond Des Ambrois, Sandro Cuomo, Angelo Mazzoni, Stefano Pantano

Men's sabre

- Giovanni Scalzo
- Gianfranco Dalla Barba
- Marco Marin

Men's team sabre

- Giovanni Scalzo, Marco Marin, Gianfranco Dalla Barba, Ferdinando Meglio, Massimo Cavaliere

Women's foil

- Margherita Zalaffi
- Dorina Vaccaroni
- Annapia Gandolfi

Women's team foil

- Dorina Vaccaroni, Margherita Zalaffi, Francesca Bortolozzi-Borella, Lucia Traversa, Annapia Gandolfi

== Football ==
Men's Team Competition

- Preliminary round (group B)

- Defeated Guatemala (5-2)
- Lost to Zambia (0-4)
- Defeated Iraq (2-0)

- Quarterfinals

- Defeated Sweden (2-1)

- Semifinals

- Lost to Soviet Union (2-3)

- Bronze Medal Match

- Lost to West Germany (0-3)

- Team roster

1. Stefano Tacconi (gk)
2. Roberto Cravero
3. Andrea Carnevale
4. Luigi De Agostini
5. Ciro Ferrara
6. Mauro Tassotti
7. Angelo Colombo
8. Luca Pellegrini
9. Massimo Brambati
10. Stefano Carobbi
11. Massimo Crippa
12. Giuliano Giuliani (gk)
13. Pietro Paolo Virdis
14. Ruggiero Rizzitelli
15. Roberto Galia
16. Giuseppe Iachini
17. Stefano Desideri
18. Massimo Mauro
19. Alberigo Evani
20. Gianluca Pagliuca (gk)

Head coach: Francesco Rocca

== Modern pentathlon ==
Three male pentathletes represented Italy in 1988. Carlo Massullo won an individual silver and the team won silver too.

Men's Individual Competition:

- Carlo Massullo – 5379 pts (→ Silver Medal)
- Daniele Masala – 5152 pts (→ 10th place)
- Gianluca Tiberti – 5040 pts (→ 17th place)

Men's Team Competition:

- Massullo, Masala, and Tiberti – 15571pts (→ Silver Medal)

== Swimming ==
Men's 100 m Freestyle

- Roberto Gleria

- Heat – 50.97 (→ did not advance, 18th place)

Men's 200 m Freestyle

- Roberto Gleria

- Heat – 1:49.51
- B-Final – 1:49.28 (→ 9th place)

- Giorgio Lamberti

- Heat – 1:50.47
- B-Final – scratched (→ did not advance, no ranking)

Men's 400 m Freestyle

- Giorgio Lamberti

- Heat – 3:53.29
- B-Final – scratched (→ did not advance, no ranking)

- Roberto Gleria

- Heat – 3:56.33 (→ did not advance, 19th place)

Men's 1500 m Freestyle

- Luca Pellegrini

- Heat – 15:18.80 (→ did not advance, 10th place)

- Stefano Battistelli

- Heat – 15:36.54 (→ did not advance, 20th place)

Men's 100 m Backstroke

- Valerio Giambalvo

- Heat – 59.48 (→ did not advance, 37th place)

Men's 200 m Backstroke

- Stefano Battistelli

- Heat – 2:03.63
- B-Final – scratched (→ did not advance, no ranking)

Men's 100 m Breaststroke

- Gianni Minervini

- Heat – 1:02.86
- Final – 1:02.93 (→ 7th place)

Men's 100 m Butterfly

- Leonardo Michelotti

- Heat – 55.83 (→ did not advance, 22nd place)

- Valerio Giambalvo

- Heat – 56.57 (→ did not advance, 28th place)

Men's 200 m Individual Medley

- Luca Sacchi

- Heat – 2:05.45
- B-Final – 2:05.68 (→ 13th place)

- Roberto Cassio

- Heat – 2:05.88 (→ did not advance, 18th place)

Men's 400 m Individual Medley

- Stefano Battistelli

- Heat – 4:20.43
- Final – 4:18.01 (→ Bronze Medal)

- Luca Sacchi

- Heat – 4:23.37
- Final – 4:23.23 (→ 7th place)

Men's 4 × 100 m Freestyle Relay

- Fabrizio Rampazzo, Giorgio Lamberti, Andrea Ceccarini, and Roberto Gleria

- Heat – 3:23.35

- Roberto Gleria, Giorgio Lamberti, Fabrizio Rampazzo, and Andrea Ceccarini

- Final – 3:22.93 (→ 8th place)

Men's 4 × 200 m Freestyle Relay

- Massimo Trevisan, Fabrizio Rampazzo, Valerio Giambalvo, and Roberto Gleria

- Heat – 7:21.85

- Roberto Gleria, Giorgio Lamberti, Massimo Trevisan, and Valerio Giambalvo

- Final – 7:16.00 (→ 5th place)

Men's 4 × 100 m Medley Relay

- Valerio Giambalvo, Gianni Minervini, Leonardo Michelotti, and Roberto Gleria

- Heat – 3:52.06 (→ did not advance, 15th place)

Women's 100 m Freestyle

- Silvia Persi

- Heat – 58.22 (→ did not advance, 29th place)

Women's 200 m Freestyle

- Silvia Persi

- Heat – 2:04.40 (→ did not advance, 23rd place)

Women's 400 m Freestyle

- Manuela Melchiorri

- Heat – 4:15.40
- B-Final – 4:14.90 (→ 14th place)

Women's 800 m Freestyle

- Manuela Melchiorri

- Heat – 8:40.63 (→ did not advance, 12th place)

Women's 100 m Backstroke

- Lorenza Vigarani

- Heat – 1:03.96
- B-Final – 1:03.88 (→ 13th place)

- Manuela Carosi

- Heat – 1:04.69
- B-Final – 1:03.80 (→ 11th place)

Women's 200 m Backstroke

- Lorenza Vigarani

- Heat – 2:17.35
- B-Final – 2:18.69 (→ 13th place)

Women's 100 m Breaststroke

- Manuela Dalla Valle

- Heat – 1:11.25
- B-Final – 1:10.95 (→ 12th place)

Women's 200 m Breaststroke

- Manuela Dalla Valle

- Heat – 2:30.60
- Final – 2:29.86 (→ 8th place)

- Annalisa Nisiro

- Heat – 2:32.77
- B-Final – 2:31.19 (→ 12th place)

Women's 100 m Butterfly

- Ilaria Tocchini

- Heat – 1:02.07
- B-Final – 1:02.78 (→ 16th place)

- Emanuela Viola

- Heat – 1:03.91 (→ did not advance, 24th place)

Women's 200 m Individual Medley

- Roberta Felotti

- Heat – 2:19.62
- B-Final – 2:19.63 (→ 13th place)

- Manuela Dalla Valle

- Heat – 2:22.85 (→ did not advance, 25th place)

Women's 400 m Individual Medley

- Roberta Felotti

- Heat – 4:49.20
- B-Final – 4:49.53 (→ 9th place)

Women's 4 × 100 m Medley Relay

- Lorenza Vigarani, Manuela Dalla Valle, Ilara Tocchini, and Silvia Persi

- Heat – 4:14.68
- Final – 4:13.85 (→ 8th place)

== Tennis ==
Men's Singles Competition

- Paolo Canè

- First round — Defeated Milan Šrejber (Czechoslovakia) 6-3 7-6 4-6 6-3
- Second round — Defeated Emilio Sánchez (Spain) 7-5 6-3 6-7 6-4
- Third round — Defeated Javier Sánchez (Spain) 7-6 4-6 6-1 6-2
- Quarterfinals — Lost to Stefan Edberg (Sweden) 1-6 5-7 4-6

- Diego Nargiso

- First round — Defeated Francisco Maciel (Mexico) 4-6 2-6 7-6 7-6 8-6
- Second round — Lost to Tim Mayotte (United States) 6-2 2-6 4-6 0-6

- Omar Camporese

- First round — Lost to Guy Forget (France) 2-6 0-6 3-6

Women's Singles Competition

- Sandra Cecchini

- First Round – Bye
- Second Round – Lost to Chris Evert (USA) 2-6 2-6

- Raffaella Reggi

- First Round – Defeated Liz Smylie (Australia) 7-6 6-0
- Second Round – Defeated Claudia Kohde-Kilsch (West Germany) 4-6 7-6 6-3
- Third Round – Defeated Chris Evert (USA) 2-6 6-4 6-1
- Quarterfinals – Lost to Manuela Maleeva (Switzerland) 3-6 4-6

== Volleyball ==
=== Men's team competition ===
- Preliminary round (group A)

- Lost to Brazil (0-3)
- Lost to Bulgaria (0-3)
- Defeated Sweden (3-2)
- Lost to Soviet Union (1-3)
- Defeated South Korea (3-0)

- Classification Matches

- 9th/12th place: Defeated Tunisia (3-0)
- 9th/10th place: Defeated Japan (3-2) → Ninth place

- Team roster

- Andrea Gardini
- Andrea Giani
- Pierpaolo Lucchetta
- Ferdinando De Giorgi
- Marco Bracci
- Claudio Galli
- Lorenzo Bernardi
- Alessandro Lazzeroni
- Massimo Castagna
- Andrea Zorzi
- Luca Cantagalli
- Andrea Lucchetta

- Head coach: Carmelo Pittera

== Water polo ==
Men's Team Competition

- Preliminary round (group A)

- Drew with Soviet Union (9-9)
- Defeated South Korea (1-11)
- Defeated Australia (7-5)
- Lost to West Germany (7-10)
- Defeated France (14-8)

- Classification Round (Group D)

- Drew with Hungary (9-9)
- Lost to Spain (9-11) → 7th place

- Team roster

- Paolo Trapanese
- Alfio Misaggi
- Andrea Pisano
- Antonello Steardo
- Alessandro Campagna
- Paolo Caldarella
- Mario Fiorillo
- Francesco Porzio
- Stefano Postiglione
- Riccardo Tempestini
- Massimiliano Ferretti
- Marco d'Altrui
- Gianni Averaimo

- Head coach: Fritz Dennerlein
