= Dieter Schneider =

Dieter Schneider may refer to:

- Dieter Schneider (fencer) (born 1959), German fencer
- Dieter Schneider (lyricist) (1937–2023), German lyricist
- Dieter Schneider (footballer) (born 1949), German football goalkeeper
