= Ildemaro =

Ildemaro is a given name. Notable people with the name include:

- Ildemaro Fernández (born 1961), Venezuelan footballer
- Ildemaro Sánchez (born 1954), Venezuelan fencer and Olympian
- Ildemaro Vargas (born 1991), Venezuelan baseball player
