= Piguła =

Piguła is a Polish surname, it is also the Polish augmentative for "pill". It may refer to:

== People ==
- Paweł Czekała, nicknamed "Piguła", founder of the Polish street punk band The Analogs
- Tadeusz Piguła, a Polish fencer
