= Sergei Koryakin =

Sergei Koryakin may refer to:

- Sergey Karjakin (born 1990), Russian chess grandmaster
- Sergey Koryazhkin (born 1960), Soviet fencer
