= Janusz Olech =

Polish fencer (born 1965)

Personal information
- Born: 4 April 1964 (age 62) Warsaw, Poland
- Children: 2

Sport
- Sport: Fencing
Medal record
Men's fencing
Representing Poland
Olympic Games
Silver medal – second place	1988 Seoul	Sabre, individual

Janusz Roman Olech (born 4 April 1965) is a Polish fencer. He won a silver medal in the individual sabre event at the 1988 Summer Olympics.
