= Andrea Ceccarini =

Italian swimmer (born 1964)

Personal information
- Born: April 14, 1964 (age 62) Rome, Italy

Sport
- Sport: Swimming
Medal record
Representing Italy
Mediterranean Games
Gold medal – first place	1983 Casablanca	4x100m freestyle relay
European Championships
Bronze medal – third place	1985 Sofia	4x100m medley relay

Andrea Ceccarini (born 14 April 1964) is an Italian former swimmer who competed in the 1980 Summer Olympics and in the 1988 Summer Olympics.
