= Atilio Tass =

Argentine fencer

Personal information
- Nationality: Argentine
- Born: 7 July 1957 (age 68)

Sport
- Sport: Fencing

Atilio Tass (born 7 July 1957) is an Argentine fencer. He competed in the individual sabre event at the 1984 Summer Olympics. He was formerly the head coach of the Brown University's fencing team.
