= Riccardo Tempestini =

Italian water polo player

Personal information
- Nationality: Italian
- Born: 9 October 1961 (age 64) Florence, Italy

Sport
- Sport: Water polo
Medal record
Representing Italy
World Championships
Silver medal – second place	1986 Madrid	Team competition
European Championships
Bronze medal – third place	1987 Strasbourg	Team competition
Bronze medal – third place	1989 Bonn	Team competition

Riccardo Tempestini (born 9 October 1961) is an Italian former water polo player. He competed in the men's tournament at the 1988 Summer Olympics.

== See also ==
- List of World Aquatics Championships medalists in water polo
