= Massimo Cavaliere =

Italian fencer

Personal information
- Born: 21 November 1962 (age 63) Naples, Italy

Sport
- Sport: Fencing
Medal record
Men's fencing
Representing Italy
Olympic Games
Bronze medal – third place	1988 Seoul	Sabre, team

Massimo Cavaliere (born 21 November 1962) is an Italian fencer. He won a bronze medal in the team sabre event at the 1988 Summer Olympics.
