= Leonardo Michelotti =

Italian swimmer

Personal information
- Born: 15 March 1965 (age 61) Cremona, Italy

Sport
- Sport: Swimming

Leonardo Michelotti (born 15 March 1965) is an Italian swimmer. He competed at the 1988 Summer Olympics and the 1992 Summer Olympics.
