= João Santos (swimmer) =

Portuguese swimmer

Personal information
- Full name: João José Mendes dos Santos
- Born: 6 May 1964 (age 62)

Sport
- Sport: Swimming

João José Mendes dos Santos (born 6 May 1964) is a Portuguese swimmer. He competed at the 1984 Summer Olympics and the 1988 Summer Olympics.
