= Valerio Giambalvo =

Italian swimmer

Personal information
- Born: 8 July 1968 (age 58) Palermo, Italy

Sport
- Sport: Swimming

Valerio Giambalvo (born 8 July 1968) is an Italian backstroke, butterfly and freestyle swimmer. He competed in four events at the 1988 Summer Olympics.
