= Dieter Schneider (footballer) =

East German footballer

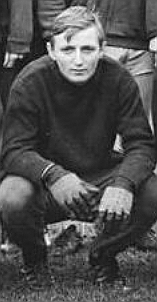
- Dieter Schneider in 1969

Personal information
- Date of birth: 20 October 1949 (age 77)
- Place of birth: Lauter, East Germany
- Height: 1.83 m (6 ft 0 in)
- Position: Goalkeeper

Youth career
- –1968: Hansa Rostock

Senior career*
Years	Team	Apps	(Gls)
1968–1986	Hansa Rostock	329	(0)
1968–1975	Hansa Rostock II	14	(0)
1986	Chemie Piestertitz		
Total		343	(0)

International career
1969–1973	East Germany	3	(0)
- * Club domestic league appearances and goals

Dieter Schneider (born 20 October 1949 in Lauter, Saxony) is a former international football goalkeeper for the German Democratic Republic.

He played 279 matches in the East German top flight for FC Hansa Rostock.

Dieter Schneider, long-time understudy of Jürgen Croy, earned 3 caps for East Germany between 1969 and 1973. He was an unused part of the East Germany Olympic team in 1972 which won the bronze medal at the Munich games.
