= Andrey Alshan =

Soviet fencer (born 1960)

Personal information
- Born: 18 March 1960 (age 66) Baku, Azerbaijan SSR, Soviet Union

Sport
- Sport: Fencing
Medal record
Men's fencing
Representing Soviet Union
Olympic Games
Silver medal – second place	1988 Seoul	Team sabre
World Championships
Gold medal – first place	1983 Vienna	Team sabre
Gold medal – first place	1985 Barcelona	Team sabre
Gold medal – first place	1986 Sofia	Team sabre
Gold medal – first place	1987 Lausanne	Team sabre
Gold medal – first place	1989 Denver	Team sabre
Gold medal – first place	1990 Lyon	Team sabre
Silver medal – second place	1981 Clermont-Ferrand	Team sabre
Silver medal – second place	1982 Rome	Individual sabre
Silver medal – second place	1991 Budapest	Team sabre
Bronze medal – third place	1982 Rome	Team sabre
Summer Universiade
Gold medal – first place	1985 Kobe	Team sabre
Silver medal – second place	1981 Bucharest	Individual sabre
Silver medal – second place	1981 Bucharest	Team sabre

Andrey Igroevich Alshan (born 18 March 1960) is a Soviet fencer. He won a silver medal in the team sabre event at the 1988 Summer Olympics.
