= Marin Mustață =

Romanian fencer (1954–2007)

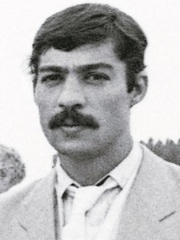

Personal information
- Born: 3 March 1954 Bucharest, Romania
- Died: August 2007 (aged 52–53)
- Height: 183 cm (6 ft 0 in)
- Weight: 73 kg (161 lb)

Sport
- Sport: Fencing
- Event: Sabre
- Club: CSA Steaua București
- Coached by: Dumitru Mustata; Alexandru Nilca
Medal record
Representing Romania
Olympic Games
Bronze medal – third place	1976 Montréal	Team sabre
Bronze medal – third place	1984 Los Angeles	Team sabre
World Championships
Silver medal – second place	1977 Buenos Aires	Team sabre
Summer Universiade
Gold medal – first place	1977 Sofia	Team sabre
Bronze medal – third place	1979 Mexico City	Individual sabre
Bronze medal – third place	1981 Bucharest	Team sabre

Marin Mustață (3 March 1954 – 2007) was a Romanian sabre fencer. He competed at the 1976, 1980 and 1984 Olympics and won team bronze medals in 1976 and 1984. After retiring from competition he worked as a fencing coach with Tractorul Brasov and the Romanian national team. He teamed with his cousin Cornel Marin who is also a sabre fencer.

In 2007, he died of lung cancer.
