= Steve Mormando =

American fencer (born 1955)

Personal information
- Nationality: American
- Born: August 14, 1955 (age 70) Toms River, New Jersey, United States
- Height: 6 ft 2 in (188 cm)
- Weight: 181 lb (82 kg)

Sport
- Sport: Fencing
Medal record
Representing United States
Pan American Games
Gold medal – first place	1991 Havana	Individual sabre
Silver medal – second place	1983 Caracas	Team sabre
Silver medal – second place	1987 Indianapolis	Team sabre
Silver medal – second place	1991 Havana	Team sabre

George Steven "Steve" Mormando (born August 14, 1955) is an American fencer. He competed in the individual and team sabre events at the 1984, 1988 and 1992 Summer Olympics. He was the national champion in sabre in 1987. He is also a successful fencing coach, a career which started in 1981. He represented the United States at four Senior World Championships (1985, 1987, 1989 and 1991). Mormando's Sabre Teammates at the Olympics include Peter Westbrook, Michael Lofton (a.k.a. Mika'il Sankofa), Robert “Bobby” Cottingham, Phil Reilly, Joel Glucksman, Paul Friedberg, and John Friedberg. He is also a member of the Fencers Club in New York (USA).

== Biography ==
Mormando was born in Toms River, New Jersey. He was raised on a farm by his grandparents, where he also worked six days a week. He graduated from Rutgers University in 1980. In 1981, he took a coaching role at New York University. In 1983, he completed his Master's in Physical Education at New York University. In 1987, he was the head coach for the men's team at the university, and two years later, he was also the head coach of the women's team. After graduating from Rutgers University in 1980, he represented the United States at four Senior World Championships (1985, 1987, 1989, and 1991).

== Career ==
=== Pan American Games ===
Mormando won a total of four medals at the Pan American Games. These included three silvers in the team Sabre event from 1983 to 1991, and an individual gold at the 1991 Pan American Games. He also competed at four editions of the World Fencing Championships between 1985 and 1991.

=== Olympic Games ===
Mormando competed at three successive Olympic Games; the 1984 Summer Olympics in Los Angeles, the 1988 Summer Olympics in Seoul and the 1992 Summer Olympics in Barcelona. His best finish was sixth place in the team Sabre event at the 1984 Olympics, and his best individual performance was 12th in the Sabre event also at the 1984 Olympics.

=== Masters level ===
Mormando won a bronze medal at the Veterans Over-50 World Championships in Florida in 2005, at the master's level and a gold medal at the 1998 Nike World Masters Games in Oregon.

== Coaching career ==
Mormando has coached for more than forty years and has produced 47 All-Americans and six NCAA Champions. He has been inducted into several halls of fame, including Rutgers University, the New Jersey Shore and Toms River High School. He was also inducted into the USA Fencing Hall of Fame in 2020.

During his years in Violets’ team, Mormando and his assistants combined won 11 consecutive University Athletic Association championships. He led the Violets to 12 top-10 national finishes, as well as 15 men's University Athletic Association (UAA) Championships (1988, 1990–2003) and 10 UAA women's titles (1989–92, 1996–2000, 2003).

== Military career ==
Mormando served in the US Navy from 1973 to 1979. He was active on duty between 1973 and 1976 and later served as a US Navy reserve during his last years of service. He also served as an Anti-Submarine Warfare Technician, Rank AWAN, as well as served on the USS Independence during the Vietnam War from 1974 to 1975.

== See also ==
- List of USFA Division I National Champions
- List of USFA Hall of Fame members
