= Massimo Castagna =

Italian volleyball player (born 1961)

Personal information
- Nationality: Italian
- Born: 12 October 1961 (age 63); Catania, Italy

Sport
- Sport: Volleyball

Massimo Castagna (born 12 October 1961) is an Italian volleyball player. He competed in the men's tournament at the 1988 Summer Olympics.
