= Hervé Granger-Veyron =

French fencer (born 1958)

Personal information
- Born: 11 January 1958 (age 68) Talence, France

Sport
- Sport: Fencing
Medal record
Men's fencing
Representing France
Olympic Games
Silver medal – second place	1984 Los Angeles	Sabre, team
Bronze medal – third place	1992 Barcelona	Sabre, team

Hervé Granger-Veyron (born 11 January 1958) is a French fencer. He won a silver medal in the team sabre at the 1984 Summer Olympics and a bronze in the same event at the 1992 Summer Olympics.
