= Sergey Mindirgasov =

Soviet fencer

Personal information
- Born: Сергей Николаевич Миндиргасов; 14 November 1959 (age 66) Luhansk, Soviet Union

Sport
- Sport: Fencing
Medal record
Men's fencing
Representing Soviet Union
Olympic Games
Silver medal – second place	1988 Seoul	Team sabre
World Championships
Gold medal – first place	1985 Barcelona	Team sabre
Gold medal – first place	1986 Sofia	Individual sabre
Gold medal – first place	1986 Sofia	Team sabre
Gold medal – first place	1987 Lausanne	Team sabre
Gold medal – first place	1989 Denver	Team sabre
Gold medal – first place	1990 Lyon	Team sabre
Summer Universiade
Gold medal – first place	1983 Edmonton	Team sabre
Gold medal – first place	1985 Kobe	Individual sabre
Gold medal – first place	1985 Kobe	Team sabre

Sergey Mindirgasov (born 14 November 1959) is a Soviet fencer. He won a silver medal in the team sabre event at the 1988 Summer Olympics.
