= Luís Monteiro =

Portuguese modern pentathlete

Personal information
- Born: 26 November 1961 (age 64)

Sport
- Sport: Modern pentathlon

Luís Monteiro (born 26 November 1961) is a Portuguese modern pentathlete. He competed at the 1984 Summer Olympics.
