= Jörg Volkmann =

German fencer

Personal information
- Born: 25 January 1958 (age 68) Wattenscheid, West Germany

Sport
- Sport: Fencing

Jörg Volkmann (born 25 January 1958) is a German fencer. He competed in the team sabre event at the 1984 Summer Olympics.
