= Sergey Koryazhkin =

Soviet fencer (born 1960)

Personal information
- Born: 2 January 1960 (age 66) Frunze, Kyrgyz SSR, Soviet Union

Sport
- Sport: Fencing
Medal record
Men's fencing
Representing Soviet Union
Olympic Games
| Silver medal – second place | 1988 Seoul | Sabre, team |

Sergey Koryazhkin (born 2 January 1960) is a Soviet fencer. He won a silver medal in the team sabre event at the 1988 Summer Olympics.
