= Wulfe Balk =

Canadian fencer (born 1955)

Personal information
- Born: 24 November 1955 (age 70) St Andrews, Fife, Scotland

Sport
- Sport: Fencing

Wulfe Balk (born 24 November 1955) is a Canadian fencer. He competed in the individual and team sabre events at the 1988 Summer Olympics.
