= Jean-François Lamour =

French fencer and politician

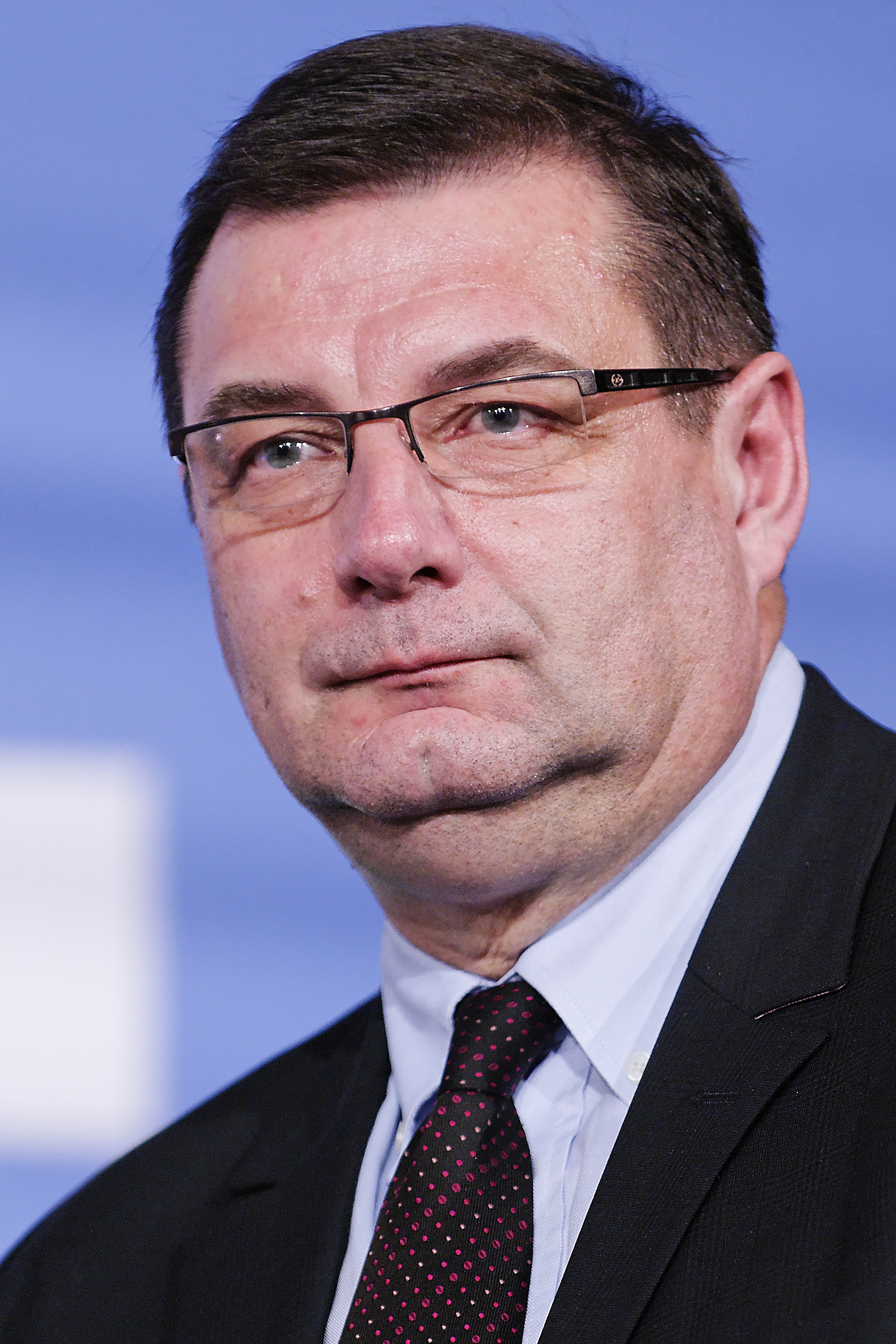

Personal information
- Born: 2 February 1956 (age 70) Paris, France
- Spouse: Dr. Isabelle Spennato

Sport
- Sport: Fencing
Medal record
Men's fencing
Representing France
Olympic Games
Gold medal – first place	1984 Los Angeles	Individual sabre
Gold medal – first place	1988 Seoul	Individual sabre
Silver medal – second place	1984 Los Angeles	Sabre team
Bronze medal – third place	1992 Barcelona	Individual sabre
Bronze medal – third place	1992 Barcelona	Sabre team
Mediterranean Games
Silver medal – second place	1983 Casablanca	Individual sabre

Jean-François Lamour (born 2 February 1956 in Paris) is a French former fencer and current politician and cabinet minister. During his fencing career, Lamour achieved various athletic accomplishments, notably qualifying for the 1987 world championship. He earned two gold medals, two silver medals, and one bronze medal in sabre Olympic events between 1984 and 1988.

After retiring from fencing, Lamour entered politics and served as the sports and youth counselor to the Mayor of Paris from 1993 to 1995. In 2002, he assumed the position of minister of sport, and later in 2004, he took on additional responsibilities for youth.

Lamour is married to Dr. Isabelle Spennato, a former French fencer who currently holds the position of president of the French Fencing Federation.

== Athletic career ==
Lamour began his fencing journey at the age of eight and attained his first notable win in 1971 at the French junior championship in Sabre fencing when he reached the age of 15.

Four years subsequent to that achievement, in 1975, Lamour advanced to the semifinals during the World Championship, which took place in Bucharest. Over the next few years, he broke the national record by winning the Champion of France title 13 times between 1977 and 1992.

During this time, he won a silver medal in the individual Sabre event at the 1983 Mediterranean Games. In the next year he achieved the gold medal at the 1984 Summer Olympics in Los Angeles. And later on in 1987, he became the World Champion in Lausanne. In 1988, Lamour received the prestigious Master of Saber prize. A few months later, he won a second gold medal in Seoul.

Under the guidance of his new coach, László Szepesi, who hails from Hungary, Lamour underwent further training as a part of the French national team. In 2002, Lamour took on the role of France's Minister of Sports.
