= Giovanni Scalzo =

Italian fencer (born 1959)

Personal information
- Born: 17 March 1959 (age 67) Messina, Italy

Sport
- Sport: Fencing
Medal record
Men's fencing
Representing Italy
Olympic Games
Gold medal – first place	1984 Los Angeles	Team sabre
Silver medal – second place	1980 Moscow	Team sabre
Bronze medal – third place	1988 Seoul	Individual sabre
Bronze medal – third place	1988 Seoul	Team sabre
World Championships
Silver medal – second place	1982 Rome	Team sabre
Silver medal – second place	1993 Essen	Team sabre
Bronze medal – third place	1983 Vienna	Team sabre
Summer Universiade
Gold medal – first place	1981 Bucharest	Individual sabre
Gold medal – first place	1981 Bucharest	Team sabre
Silver medal – second place	1983 Edmonton	Individual sabre
Silver medal – second place	1983 Edmonton	Team sabre
Bronze medal – third place	1985 Kobe	Team sabre

Giovanni Scalzo (born 17 March 1959) is an Italian fencer. He won a gold medal in the team sabre event at the 1984 Summer Olympics, silver medal in the team sabre event at the 1980 Summer Olympics and two bronze medals at the 1988 Summer Olympics.
