= Lee Byung-nam =

South Korean fencer

Lee Byeong-nam
Personal information
- Born: 25 March 1964 (age 62)

Sport
- Sport: Fencing

Lee Byeong-nam (born 25 March 1964) is a South Korean fencer. He competed in the individual and team sabre events at the 1988 Summer Olympics.
