= Freddy Scholz =

German fencer

Personal information
- Born: 14 September 1961 (age 64) Düsseldorf, West Germany

Sport
- Sport: Fencing

Freddy Scholz (born 14 September 1961) is a German fencer. He competed in the individual and team sabre events at the 1984 Summer Olympics.
