= Olivier Martini =

Monegasque fencer (born 1965)

Personal information
- Born: 26 May 1965 (age 61)

Sport
- Sport: Fencing

Olivier Martini (born 26 May 1965) is a Monegasque fencer. He competed in the individual sabre events at the 1984 and 1988 Summer Olympics.

He was part of the Monegasque delegation to the World University Games in 1987.
