= Claude Marcil =

Canadian fencer

Personal information
- Born: 29 May 1963 (age 63) Chibougamau, Quebec

Sport
- Sport: Fencing

Claude Marcil (born 29 May 1963) is a Canadian fencer. He competed in the individual and team sabre events at the 1984 Summer Olympics.
