= João Marquilhas =

Portuguese fencer

Personal information
- Born: 24 July 1959 (age 66)

Sport
- Sport: Fencing

João Marquilhas (born 24 July 1959) is a Portuguese fencer. He competed in the individual sabre event at the 1984 Summer Olympics.
