= Liu Guozhen =

Chinese fencer

Personal information
- Full name: Chinese: 劉 國震; pinyin: Liú Guó-zhèn
- Born: 16 January 1957 (age 69)

Sport
- Sport: Fencing

Liu Guozhen (born 16 January 1957) is a Chinese fencer. He competed in the individual and team sabre events at the 1984 Summer Olympics.
