= Stephan Thönnessen =

German fencer

Personal information
- Born: 20 March 1962 (age 64) Cologne, West Germany

Sport
- Sport: Fencing

Stephan Thönnessen (born 20 March 1962) is a German fencer. He competed in the individual and team sabre events at the 1988 Summer Olympics.
