= Philippe Delrieu =

French fencer (born 1959)

Personal information
- Born: 10 August 1959 (age 66) Tarbes, France

Sport
- Sport: Fencing
Medal record
Men's fencing
Representing France
Olympic Games
Silver medal – second place	1984 Los Angeles	Sabre, team

Philippe Delrieu (born 10 August 1959) is a French former fencer. He won a silver medal in the team sabre event at the 1984 Summer Olympics.
