= Ildemaro Sánchez =

Venezuelan fencer (born 1954)

Personal information
- Born: 7 February 1954 (age 72)

Sport
- Sport: Fencing

Ildemaro Sánchez (born 7 February 1954) is a Venezuelan fencer. He competed in the individual sabre event at the 1984 Summer Olympics.
