= Chen Jinchu =

Chinese fencer (born 1957)

Personal information
- Full name: Chinese: 陳 金初; pinyin: Chén Jīn-chū
- Born: 3 August 1957 (age 68) Zhongshan, Guangdong, China

Sport
- Sport: Fencing

Chen Jinchu (born 3 August 1957) is a Chinese fencer. He competed in the individual and team sabre events at the 1984 Summer Olympics.
