= Nikolay Marincheshki =

Bulgarian fencer (1957–2023)

Personal information
- Born: 18 September 1957 Plovdiv, Bulgaria
- Died: 9 August 2023 (aged 65)

Sport
- Sport: Fencing

Nikolay Marincheshki (Bulgarian: Николай Маринчешки, 18 September 1957 – 11 August 2023) was a Bulgarian fencer.

Marincheshki competed in the team sabre event at the 1980 Summer Olympics and the individual and team sabre events at the 1988 Summer Olympics.
