= Gianfranco Dalla Barba =

Italian fencer (1957–2024)

Personal information
- Born: 11 June 1957 Padua, Italy
- Died: 21 November 2024 (aged 67)

Sport
- Sport: Fencing
Medal record
Men's fencing
Representing Italy
Olympic Games
| Gold medal – first place | 1984 Los Angeles | Team sabre |
| Bronze medal – third place | 1988 Seoul | Team sabre |
World Championships
| Silver medal – second place | 1979 Melbourne | Team sabre |
| Silver medal – second place | 1982 Rome | Team sabre |
| Silver medal – second place | 1983 Vienna | Team sabre |
| Bronze medal – third place | 1978 Hamburg | Team sabre |
Summer Universiade
| Gold medal – first place | 1981 Bucharest | Team sabre |
| Silver medal – second place | 1983 Edmonton | Team sabre |
| Bronze medal – third place | 1983 Edmonton | Individual sabre |
| Bronze medal – third place | 1985 Kobe | Team sabre |

Gianfranco Dalla Barba (11 June 1957 – 21 November 2024) was an Italian fencer. He won a gold medal in the team sabre at the 1984 Summer Olympics and a bronze in the same event at the 1988 Summer Olympics. After Graduating in medicine and surgery with a specialization in neurology in 1985 at the university of Padua, he then obtained a PhD in neurological sciences at the University of Siena in 1995. after which he moved to France to become a first researcher at the INSERM in Paris. in 2007, he moved back to Italy as an Associate Professor of Psychobiology and Physiological Psychology at the University of Trieste where he stayed until 2023. On 22 November 2024, it was announced that Dalla Barba had died from cardiac arrest at the age of 67.
