= Mark Slade (fencer) =

British fencer (born 1958)

Personal information
- Born: 2 August 1958 (age 67) Ingatestone, England

Sport
- Sport: Fencing

Mark Gainsford Slade (born 2 August 1958) is a British fencer. He competed at the 1980, 1984 and 1988 Summer Olympics. He was a three times British fencing champion, winning the sabre title at the British Fencing Championships in 1979, 1985 and 1988.
