= Jörg Stratmann =

German fencer

Personal information
- Born: 7 April 1954 (age 72) Letmathe, West Germany

Sport
- Sport: Fencing

Jörg Stratmann (born 7 April 1954) is a German fencer. He competed in the individual and team sabre events at the 1984 Summer Olympics.
