= Dieter Schneider (fencer) =

German fencer

Personal information
- Born: 20 February 1959 (age 67) Koblenz, West Germany

Sport
- Sport: Fencing

Dieter Schneider (born 20 February 1959) is a German fencer. He competed in the team sabre events at the 1984 and 1988 Summer Olympics.
