= Tadeusz Piguła =

Polish fencer

Personal information
- Born: 10 August 1952 (age 73) Konin, Poland

Sport
- Sport: Fencing

Tadeusz Piguła (born 10 August 1952) is a Polish fencer. He competed at the 1980 and 1988 Summer Olympics.
