= Pierre Guichot =

French fencer (born 1963)

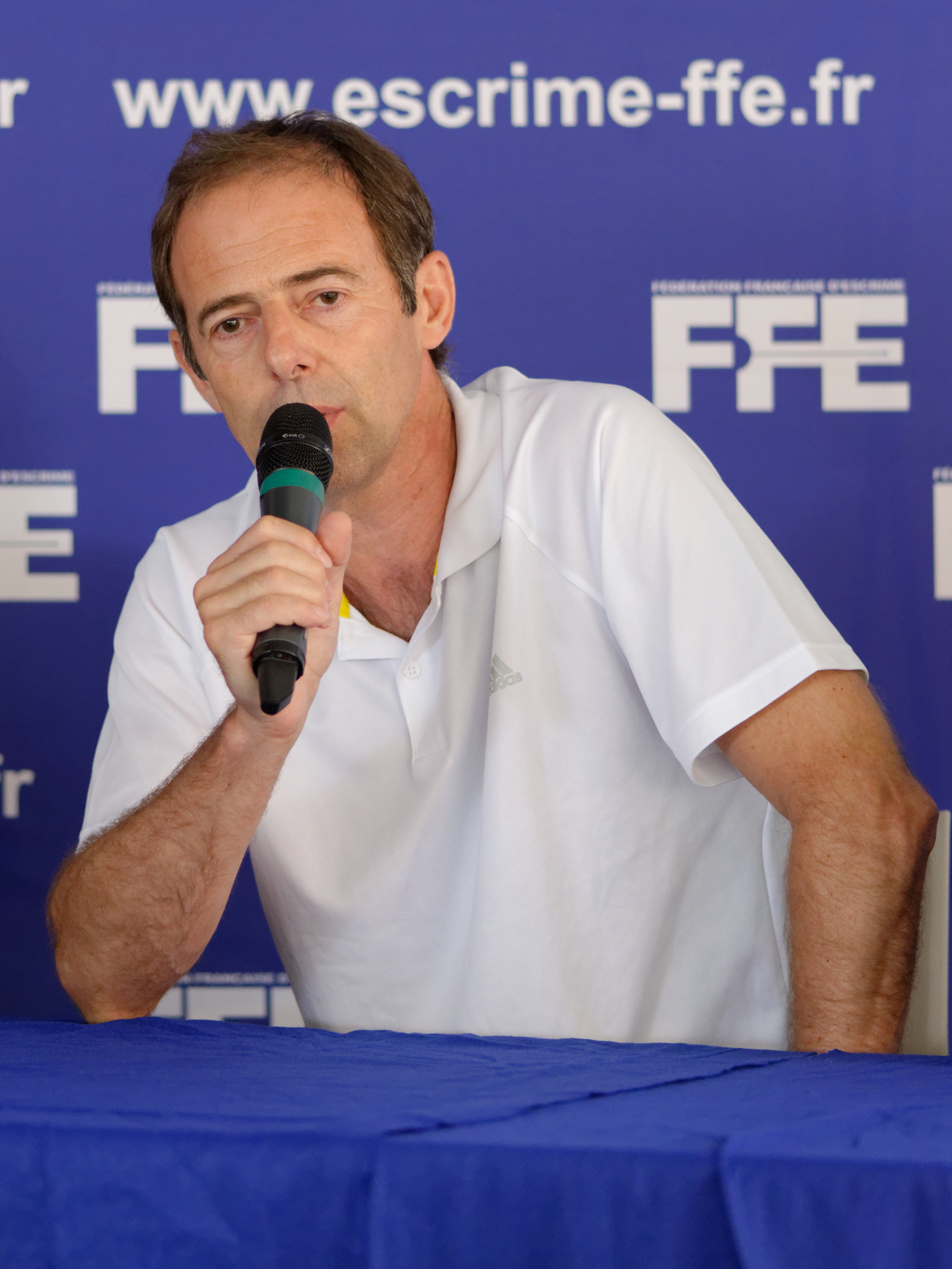
- Pierre Guichot (2013)

Personal information
- Born: 16 February 1963 (age 63) Aureilhan, France

Sport
- Sport: Fencing
Medal record
Men's fencing
Representing France
Olympic Games
| Silver medal – second place | 1984 Los Angeles | Sabre, team |
| Bronze medal – third place | 1992 Barcelona | Sabre, team |

Pierre Guichot (French pronunciation: [pjɛʁ ɡiʃo]; born 16 February 1963) is a French former fencer. He won a silver medal in the team sabre at the 1984 Summer Olympics and a bronze in the same event at the 1992 Summer Olympics.
