= John Zarno =

British fencer

Personal information
- Born: 27 September 1950 (age 75) New York, New York, United States

Sport
- Sport: Fencing

John Zarno (born 27 September 1950) is a British fencer. He competed in the individual and team sabre events at the 1984 Summer Olympics.
