= Wang Ruiji =

Chinese fencer (born 1957)

Personal information
- Full name: Chinese: 王銳基; pinyin: Wáng Ruì-jī
- Nationality: Chinese
- Born: 9 February 1957 (age 69) Dongguan, Guangdong, China
- Spouse: Zhou Ping

Sport
- Country: China
- Sport: Fencing
- Team: China

Wang Ruiji (Chinese: 王銳基; born 9 February 1957) is a Chinese fencer who competed at the 1984 and 1988 Summer Olympics. He is the father of rapper Jackson Wang.
