= Mika'il Sankofa =

American fencer and coach

Personal information
- Born: 10 December 1963 (age 62) Montgomery, Alabama, United States

Sport
- Sport: Fencing

Mika'il Sankofa (born Michael Lofton, 10 December 1963 in Montgomery, Alabama) is a sabre fencer and coach. He competed in the individual and team sabre events at the 1984, 1988 and 1992 Summer Olympics.

== Background ==
During his fencing career, Sankofa trained under Tanya Adamovich, Csaba Elthes, Peter Frohlich, Szabo Adrosh, Christian Bauer and Lazlo Szepesi.

A graduate of New York University with a BA in Economics, Sankofa is a former publicist who has worked for firms such as Ernst & Young, Grey Advertising, Kirshenbaum, Bond & Partners and Shandwick International.

From 1990 - 2009, Sankofa served as co-founder, director of athletics and fencing coach for the Peter Westbrook Foundation. He was responsible for running a year-round class for over 200 participants, including a number of elite-level athletes. Sankofa's students have included three NCAA champions, five national champions, six junior world team members, the 2005 Junior Olympic men's cadet and junior sabre champions, the 2005 Junior Olympic women's sabre champion and the 2005 national cadet men's sabre champion.

Sankofa also serves as head fencing coach at the United Nations International School as well as the head sabre coach at the Ross School's summer program in East Hampton, New York where he ran the Sankofa Sabre Camp. He conducts clinics and does color commentary for fencing competitions around the country.

In 2006, Sankofa received his Maestro’s degree with honors from Semmelweis University in Budapest, Hungary.

Sankofa served as the head coach for the Stevens Institute of Technology men's fencing team 2005-09.

Sankofa served as an analyst for NBC Sports' coverage of fencing at the 2008 Summer Olympics.

He ran Thrust Fencing Academy for fourteen years and has also run the Thrust Regional Fencing tournaments attracting thousands of nationally ranked from around the country and international fencers from as far as China, Qatar, South America and Canada.

Currently he is the Head of Sabre Development at Forge Fencing Academy in Durham, NC.

== Records ==
Sankofa had an outstanding career as a competitive sabre fencer. He was a member of the United States Olympic Team in 1984, 1988 and 1992, and reached the pinnacle of his sport when he captured US national sabre championships in both 1991 and 1992.

He took part in the Pan-American Games as member of Sabre Team Silver in 1987 and 1991. In addition, Sankofa was a ten-time National Team Sabre Champion, in 1984, 1985, 1986, 1987, 1988, 1990, 1991, 1992, 1994, and 1995.

Sankofa was also a four-time NCAA champion for the Violets, capturing the sabre title in 1984, 1985, 1986 and 1987. He is the only male fencer to ever win four NCAA individual championships.

== Hall of Fame ==
In 1994, he was inducted into the NYU Sports Hall of Fame, and in the summer of 2005, he was inducted into the United States Fencing Association Hall of Fame.

== See also ==
- USFA
- List of USFA Hall of Fame members
- List of USFA Division I National Champions
- List of NCAA fencing champions
