= United States at the 2008 Summer Olympics =

- Flag of the United States
- IOC code: USA
- NOC: United States Olympic Committee

in Beijing
- Competitors: 588 (306 men and 282 women) in 32 sports
- Flag bearers: Lopez Lomong (opening); Khatuna Lorig (closing)
- Medals Ranked 2nd: Gold 36 Silver 39 Bronze 37 Total 112

Summer Olympics appearances (overview)
- 1896; 1900; 1904; 1908; 1912; 1920; 1924; 1928; 1932; 1936; 1948; 1952; 1956; 1960; 1964; 1968; 1972; 1976; 1980; 1984; 1988; 1992; 1996; 2000; 2004; 2008; 2012; 2016; 2020; 2024; 2028

Other related appearances
- 1906 Intercalated Games

The United States of America (USA), represented by the United States Olympic Committee (USOC), competed at the 2008 Summer Olympics in Beijing, China. U.S. athletes have competed in every Summer Olympic Games in the modern era, except the 1980 Summer Olympics in Moscow, which was boycotted by the American team and 65 other countries in protest of the Soviet invasion of Afghanistan. The USOC sent a total of 588 athletes to Beijing (310 men and 286 women), and competed in all Olympic sports except handball.

The USOC selected San Jose State University in San Jose, California, as the primary processing center for all Team USA members headed for Beijing 2008. They flew into San Jose via San Jose International Airport or San Francisco International Airport for at least two days of document checks, health examinations, cultural briefings, portrait sittings, uniform fittings, and last-minute workout sessions.

The U.S. did not win the most gold medals for the first time in a Summer Games since 1992, with China being the country that won the most golds (48–36). The United States never led the medal table during the games. However, the U.S. won its most medals ever (112) in a games not held on home soil, had the highest total medal count, and won more silver and bronze medals than any other participating nation. This edition of the games also saw a gold medal record for U.S. swimmer Michael Phelps, who won 8 golds, surpassing Mark Spitz's record of 7 golds in a single Olympic event in 1972. Phelps also surpassed Spitz, Larisa Latynina of the USSR, Paavo Nurmi of Finland, and U.S. sprinter Carl Lewis to become the current record holder for the most Olympic gold medals (14).

The United States also saw milestones in women's swimming. Natalie Coughlin won 6 medals in Beijing, the most for a female Olympic swimmer. Dara Torres, who won 3 silver medals after her eight-year absence, became the oldest Olympic swimmer to win a medal, at age 41.

Gymnast Nastia Liukin became the third U.S. female to win a gold medal in individual all-around event. It was also a successful Olympics for U.S. team-based sports, as men's and women's basketball teams both won gold, as did men's volleyball, men's and women's beach volleyball, women's soccer, women's eight in rowing, and the men's and women's 4 × 400 meter-relay teams. The US won silver and bronze medals in several other team events; women's volleyball, softball, baseball, both men's and women's team gymnastics, men's fencing sabre team, women's fencing foil team, and both men's and women's water polo.

== Medalists ==
The following U.S. competitors won medals at the games. In the discipline sections below, the medalists' names are bolded.

Medal	Name	Sport	Event	Date
Gold	Mariel Zagunis	Fencing	Women's sabre	August 9
Gold	Michael Phelps	Swimming	Men's 400 m individual medley	August 10
Gold	Nathan Adrian^{[a]} Matt Grevers^{[a]} Cullen Jones; Jason Lezak; Michael Phelps; Garrett Weber-Gale; Ben Wildman-Tobriner^{[a]}	Swimming	Men's 4 × 100 m freestyle relay	August 11
Gold	Michael Phelps	Swimming	Men's 200 m freestyle	August 12
Gold	Natalie Coughlin	Swimming	Women's 100 m backstroke	August 12
Gold	Aaron Peirsol	Swimming	Men's 100 m backstroke	August 12
Gold	Walton Eller	Shooting	Men's double trap	August 12
Gold	Michael Phelps	Swimming	Men's 200 m butterfly	August 13
Gold	Ricky Berens; Klete Keller^{[a]} Ryan Lochte; Michael Phelps; Peter Vanderkaay; Erik Vendt^{[a]} David Walters^{[a]}	Swimming	Men's 4 × 200 m freestyle relay	August 13
Gold	Kristin Armstrong	Cycling	Women's time trial	August 13
Gold	Rebecca Soni	Swimming	Women's 200 m breaststroke	August 15
Gold	Ryan Lochte	Swimming	Men's 200 m backstroke	August 15
Gold	Michael Phelps	Swimming	Men's 200 m individual medley	August 15
Gold	Nastia Liukin	Gymnastics	Women's artistic individual all-around	August 15
Gold	Michael Phelps	Swimming	Men's 100 m butterfly	August 16
Gold	Vincent Hancock	Shooting	Men's skeet	August 16
Gold	Ian Crocker^{[a]} Mark Gangloff^{[a]} Matt Grevers^{[a]} Brendan Hansen; Jason Lezak; Aaron Peirsol; Michael Phelps; Garrett Weber-Gale^{[a]}	Swimming	Men's 4 × 100 m medley relay	August 17
Gold	Serena Williams; Venus Williams	Tennis	Women's doubles	August 17
Gold	Erin Cafaro; Anna Cummins; Caryn Davies; Susan Francia; Anna Goodale; Caroline Lind; Elle Logan; Lindsay Shoop; Mary Whipple	Rowing	Women's eight	August 17
Gold	Stephanie Brown Trafton	Athletics	Women's discus throw	August 18
Gold	Angelo Taylor	Athletics	Men's 400 m hurdles	August 18
Gold	Laura Kraut; Beezie Madden; Will Simpson; McLain Ward	Equestrian	Team jumping	August 18
Gold	Anna Tunnicliffe	Sailing	Women's Laser Radial class	August 19
Gold	Henry Cejudo	Wrestling	Men's freestyle 55 kg	August 19
Gold	Shawn Johnson	Gymnastics	Women's balance beam	August 19
Gold	Dawn Harper	Athletics	Women's 100 m hurdles	August 19
Gold	Misty May-Treanor; Kerri Walsh	Beach volleyball	Women's tournament	August 21
Gold	LaShawn Merritt	Athletics	Men's 400 m	August 21
Gold	United States women's national soccer team: Nicole Barnhart; Shannon Boxx; Rachel Buehler; Lori Chalupny; Lauren Cheney; Stephanie Cox; Tobin Heath; Angela Hucles; Natasha Kai; Carli Lloyd; Kate Markgraf; Heather Mitts; Heather O'Reilly; Christie Rampone; Amy Rodriguez; Hope Solo; Lindsay Tarpley; Aly Wagner	Football	Women's tournament	August 21
Gold	Phil Dalhausser; Todd Rogers	Beach volleyball	Men's tournament	August 22
Gold	Bryan Clay	Athletics	Men's decathlon	August 22
Gold	Kerron Clement^{[a]} LaShawn Merritt; David Neville; Angelo Taylor; Jeremy Wariner; Reggie Witherspoon^{[a]}	Athletics	Men's 4 × 400 m relay	August 23
Gold	Allyson Felix; Natasha Hastings^{[a]} Monique Henderson; Sanya Richards; Mary Wineberg	Athletics	Women's 4 × 400 m relay	August 23
Gold	United States women's national basketball team: Seimone Augustus; Sue Bird; Tamika Catchings; Sylvia Fowles; Kara Lawson; Lisa Leslie; DeLisha Milton-Jones; Candace Parker; Cappie Pondexter; Katie Smith; Diana Taurasi; Tina Thompson	Basketball	Women's tournament	August 23
Gold	United States men's national volleyball team: Lloy Ball; Gabriel Gardner; Kevin Hansen; Tom Hoff; Rich Lambourne; David Lee; Ryan Millar; Reid Priddy; Sean Rooney; Riley Salmon; Clay Stanley; Scott Touzinsky	Volleyball	Men's tournament	August 24
Gold	United States men's national basketball team: Carmelo Anthony; Carlos Boozer; Chris Bosh; Kobe Bryant; Dwight Howard; LeBron James; Jason Kidd; Chris Paul; Tayshaun Prince; Michael Redd; Dwyane Wade; Deron Williams	Basketball	Men's tournament	August 24
Silver	Sada Jacobson	Fencing	Women's sabre	August 9
Silver	Natalie Coughlin; Kara Lynn Joyce; Lacey Nymeyer; Emily Silver^{[a]} Julia Smit^{[a]} Dara Torres	Swimming	Women's 4 × 100 m freestyle relay	August 10
Silver	Christine Magnuson	Swimming	Women's 100 m butterfly	August 11
Silver	Katie Hoff	Swimming	Women's 400 m freestyle	August 11
Silver	Matt Grevers	Swimming	Men's 100 m backstroke	August 12
Silver	Rebecca Soni	Swimming	Women's 100 m breaststroke	August 12
Silver	Gina Miles	Equestrian	Individual eventing	August 12
Silver	Shawn Johnson; Nastia Liukin; Chellsie Memmel; Samantha Peszek; Alicia Sacramone; Bridget Sloan	Gymnastics	Women's artistic team all-around	August 13
Silver	Kimberly Rhode	Shooting	Women's skeet	August 14
Silver	Aaron Peirsol	Swimming	Men's 200 m backstroke	August 15
Silver	Matthew Emmons	Shooting	Men's 50 m rifle prone	August 15
Silver	Shawn Johnson	Gymnastics	Women's artistic individual all-around	August 15
Silver	Christian Cantwell	Athletics	Men's shot put	August 15
Silver	Margaret Hoelzer	Swimming	Women's 200 m backstroke	August 16
Silver	Michelle Guérette	Rowing	Women's single sculls	August 16
Silver	Emily Cross; Erinn Smart; Hanna Thompson	Fencing	Women's team foil	August 16
Silver	Hyleas Fountain	Athletics	Women's heptathlon	August 16
Silver	Dara Torres	Swimming	Women's 50 m freestyle	August 17
Silver	Elaine Breeden^{[a]} Natalie Coughlin; Margaret Hoelzer^{[a]} Megan Jendrick^{[a]} Kara Lynn Joyce^{[a]} Christine Magnuson; Rebecca Soni; Dara Torres	Swimming	Women's 4 × 100 m medley relay	August 17
Silver	Zach Railey	Sailing	Finn class	August 17
Silver	Tim Morehouse; Jason Rogers; Keeth Smart; James Williams	Fencing	Men's team sabre	August 17
Silver	Shawn Johnson	Gymnastics	Women's floor	August 17
Silver	Kerron Clement	Athletics	Men's 400 m hurdles	August 18
Silver	Nastia Liukin	Gymnastics	Women's uneven bars	August 18
Silver	Jennifer Stuczynski	Athletics	Women's pole vault	August 18
Silver	Nastia Liukin	Gymnastics	Women's balance beam	August 19
Silver	Jonathan Horton	Gymnastics	Men's horizontal bar	August 19
Silver	Sheena Tosta	Athletics	Women's 400 m hurdles	August 20
Silver	Shawn Crawford	Athletics	Men's 200 m	August 20
Silver	United States women's national water polo team: Elizabeth Armstrong; Patty Cardenas; Kami Craig; Natalie Golda; Alison Gregorka; Brittany Hayes; Jaime Hipp; Heather Petri; Jessica Steffens; Moriah van Norman; Brenda Villa; Lauren Wenger; Elsie Windes	Water polo	Women's tournament	August 21
Silver	United States women's national softball team: Monica Abbott; Laura Berg; Crystl Bustos; Andrea Duran; Jennie Finch; Tairia Flowers; Victoria Galindo; Lovieanne Jung; Kelly Kretschman; Lauren Lappin; Caitlin Lowe; Jessica Mendoza; Stacey Nuveman; Cat Osterman; Natasha Watley	Softball	Women's tournament	August 21
Silver	Allyson Felix	Athletics	Women's 200 m	August 21
Silver	Mark Lopez	Taekwondo	Men's 68 kg	August 21
Silver	Jeremy Wariner	Athletics	Men's 400 m	August 21
Silver	David Payne	Athletics	Men's 110 m hurdles	August 21
Silver	Mike Day	Cycling	Men's BMX	August 22
Silver	United States women's national volleyball team: Robyn Ah Mow-Santos; Lindsey Berg; Heather Bown; Nicole Davis; Kim Glass; Tayyiba Haneef-Park; Jennifer Joines; Ogonna Nnamani; Danielle Scott-Arruda; Stacy Sykora; Logan Tom; Kim Willoughby	Volleyball	Women's tournament	August 23
Silver	United States men's national water polo team: Tony Azevedo; Ryan Bailey; Layne Beaubien; Brandon Brooks; Peter Hudnut; Tim Hutten; J. W. Krumpholz; Rick Merlo; Merrill Moses; Jeff Powers; Jesse Smith; Peter Varellas; Adam Wright	Water polo	Men's tournament	August 24
Silver	Shalane Flanagan	Athletics	Women's 10000 m	August 15
Bronze	Jason Turner	Shooting	Men's 10 m air pistol	August 9
Bronze	Rebecca Ward	Fencing	Women's sabre	August 9
Bronze	Ryan Lochte	Swimming	Men's 400 m individual medley	August 10
Bronze	Larsen Jensen	Swimming	Men's 400 m freestyle	August 10
Bronze	Katie Hoff	Swimming	Women's 400 m individual medley	August 10
Bronze	Corey Cogdell	Shooting	Women's trap	August 11
Bronze	Peter Vanderkaay	Swimming	Men's 200 m freestyle	August 12
Bronze	Margaret Hoelzer	Swimming	Women's 100 m backstroke	August 12
Bronze	Alexander Artemev; Raj Bhavsar; Joe Hagerty; Jonathan Horton; Justin Spring; Kevin Tan	Gymnastics	Men's artistic team all-around	August 12
Bronze	Natalie Coughlin	Swimming	Women's 200 m individual medley	August 13
Bronze	Levi Leipheimer	Cycling	Men's time trial	August 13
Bronze	Ronda Rousey	Judo	Women's 70 kg	August 13
Bronze	Jason Lezak	Swimming	Men's 100 m freestyle	August 14
Bronze	Caroline Burckle; Natalie Coughlin; Katie Hoff; Christine Marshall^{[a]} Allison Schmitt; Julia Smit^{[a]} Kim Vandenberg^{[a]}	Swimming	Women's 4 × 200 m freestyle relay	August 14
Bronze	Sada Jacobson; Rebecca Ward; Mariel Zagunis	Fencing	Women's team sabre	August 14
Bronze	Adam Wheeler	Wrestling	Men's Greco-Roman 96 kg	August 14
Bronze	Ryan Lochte	Swimming	Men's 200 m individual medley	August 15
Bronze	Natalie Coughlin	Swimming	Women's 100 m freestyle	August 15
Bronze	Bob Bryan; Mike Bryan	Tennis	Men's doubles	August 16
Bronze	Walter Dix	Athletics	Men's 100 m	August 16
Bronze	Randi Miller	Wrestling	Women's freestyle 63 kg	August 17
Bronze	Wyatt Allen; Micah Boyd; Steven Coppola; Beau Hoopman; Josh Inman; Marcus McElhenney; Matt Schnobrich; Bryan Volpenhein; Daniel Walsh	Rowing	Men's eight	August 17
Bronze	Nastia Liukin	Gymnastics	Women's floor	August 17
Bronze	Bershawn Jackson	Athletics	Men's 400 meter hurdles	August 18
Bronze	Sanya Richards	Athletics	Women's 400 meters	August 19
Bronze	Walter Dix	Athletics	Men's 200 meters	August 20
Bronze	Diana Lopez	Taekwondo	Women's 57 kg	August 21
Bronze	David Neville	Athletics	Men's 400 m	August 21
Bronze	David Oliver	Athletics	Men's 110 m hurdles	August 21
Bronze	Beezie Madden	Equestrian	Individual jumping	August 21
Bronze	Derek Miles	Athletics	Men's pole vault	August 22
Bronze	Jill Kintner	Cycling	Women's BMX	August 22
Bronze	Donny Robinson	Cycling	Men's BMX	August 22
Bronze	Deontay Wilder	Boxing	Heavyweight	August 22
Bronze	Steven López	Taekwondo	Men's 80 kg	August 22
Bronze	United States national baseball team: Brett Anderson; Jake Arrieta; Brian Barden; Matthew Brown; Trevor Cahill; Jeremy Cummings; Jason Donald; Brian Duensing; Dexter Fowler; John Gall; Mike Hessman; Kevin Jepsen; Brandon Knight; Mike Koplove; Matthew LaPorta; Lou Marson; Blaine Neal; Jayson Nix; Nate Schierholtz; Jeff Stevens; Stephen Strasburg; Taylor Teagarden; Terry Tiffee; Casey Weathers	Baseball	Men's tournament	August 23
Bronze	Chaunte Howard	Athletics	Women's high jump	August 23

Medals by sport
Sport	1st place, gold medalist(s)	2nd place, silver medalist(s)	3rd place, bronze medalist(s)	Total
Swimming	12	9	10	**31**
Athletics	7	10	8	**25**
Volleyball	3	1	0	**4**
Gymnastics	2	6	2	**10**
Shooting	2	2	2	**6**
Basketball	2	0	0	**2**
Fencing	1	3	2	**6**
Cycling	1	1	3	**5**
Equestrian	1	1	1	**3**
Rowing	1	1	1	**3**
Sailing	1	1	0	**2**
Wrestling	1	0	2	**3**
Tennis	1	0	1	**2**
Soccer	1	0	0	**1**
Water polo	0	2	0	**2**
Taekwondo	0	1	2	**3**
Softball	0	1	0	**1**
Baseball	0	0	1	**1**
Boxing	0	0	1	**1**
Judo	0	0	1	**1**
Total	36	39	37	112

Medals by day
Day	Date	1st place, gold medalist(s)	2nd place, silver medalist(s)	3rd place, bronze medalist(s)	Total
1	August 9	1	1	2	**4**
2	August 10	1	1	3	**5**
3	August 11	1	2	1	**4**
4	August 12	4	3	3	**10**
5	August 13	3	1	3	**7**
6	August 14	0	1	4	**5**
7	August 15	4	5	2	**11**
8	August 16	2	4	2	**8**
9	August 17	3	5	3	**11**
10	August 18	3	3	1	**7**
11	August 19	4	2	1	**7**
12	August 20	0	2	1	**3**
13	August 21	3	6	4	**13**
14	August 22	2	1	5	**8**
15	August 23	3	1	2	**6**
17	August 24	2	1	0	**3**
Total		36	39	37	112

Medals by gender
Gender	1st place, gold medalist(s)	2nd place, silver medalist(s)	3rd place, bronze medalist(s)	Total	Percentage
Female	15	25	16	**56**	50.0%
Male	20	14	21	**55**	49.1%
Mixed	1	0	0	**1**	0.9%
Total	36	39	37	112	100.0%

Multiple medalists
Name	Sport	1st place, gold medalist(s)	2nd place, silver medalist(s)	3rd place, bronze medalist(s)	Total
Michael Phelps	Swimming	8	0	0	**8**
Natalie Coughlin	Swimming	1	2	3	**6**
Nastia Liukin	Gymnastics	1	3	1	**5**
Ryan Lochte	Swimming	2	0	2	**4**
Shawn Johnson	Gymnastics	1	3	0	**4**
Matt Grevers	Swimming	2	1	0	**3**
Aaron Peirsol	Swimming	2	1	0	**3**
Jason Lezak	Swimming	2	0	1	**3**
Rebecca Soni	Swimming	1	2	0	**3**
Dara Torres	Swimming	0	3	0	**3**
Margaret Hoelzer	Swimming	0	2	1	**3**
Katie Hoff	Swimming	0	1	2	**3**
LaShawn Merritt	Track & field	2	0	0	**2**
Angelo Taylor	Track & field	2	0	0	**2**
Garrett Weber-Gale	Swimming	2	0	0	**2**
Kerron Clement	Track & field	1	1	0	**2**
Allyson Felix	Track & field	1	1	0	**2**
Jeremy Wariner	Track & field	1	1	0	**2**
Beezie Madden	Equestrian	1	0	1	**2**
David Neville	Track & field	1	0	1	**2**
Sanya Richards	Track & field	1	0	1	**2**
Peter Vanderkaay	Swimming	1	0	1	**2**
Mariel Zagunis	Fencing	1	0	1	**2**
Kara Lynn Joyce	Swimming	0	2	0	**2**
Christine Magnuson	Swimming	0	2	0	**2**
Jonathan Horton	Gymnastics	0	1	1	**2**
Sada Jacobson	Fencing	0	1	1	**2**
Julia Smit	Swimming	0	1	1	**2**
Walter Dix	Track & field	0	0	2	**2**
Becca Ward	Fencing	0	0	2	**2**

^{a} Athletes who participated in the preliminaries but not the final.

Won all medals in one event

- Women's sabre
- Men's 400 m
- Men's 400 m hurdles

Won all gold medals in one sport

- Basketball (2 gold)
- Beach volleyball (2 gold)

Won gold medals in both men's and women's events

- 100 m backstroke
- 4 × 400 meter relay

== Archery ==
The United States men's archery team took sixth place at the 2007 World Outdoor Target Championships, earning the nation a full complement of three qualification spots for the Olympic men's competitions. The women's team finished in eleventh place, not qualifying the team. Jennifer Nichols earned a spot via individual qualification in that tournament. Karen Scavotto earned the United States another women's spot by finishing second in the Pan American championship.

The United States announced its Olympic team on May 5, 2008, following a national selection tournament. The women's roster included 2004 Olympian Jennifer Nichols and three-time Olympian Khatuna Lorig, who previously represented the Unified Team (1992) and Georgia (1996 and 2000) at the Olympics. On the men's side, first-time Olympian Brady Ellison joined four-time Olympian Butch Johnson and two-time Olympian Vic Wunderle.

Athlete	Event	Ranking round		Round of 64	Round of 32	Round of 16	Quarterfinals	Semifinals	Final / BM	
Athlete	Event	Score	Seed	Opposition Score	Opposition Score	Opposition Score	Opposition Score	Opposition Score	Opposition Score	Rank
Brady Ellison	Men's individual	664	15	Burnes (CAN); W 111–89	Lyon (CAN); L 107–113	Did not advance				
Butch Johnson	Men's individual	653	40	Abramov (RUS); W 109 (26)–109 (25)	Im (KOR); L 106–115	Did not advance				
Vic Wunderle	Men's individual	652	41	Vélez (MEX); W 106–102	di Buò (ITA); W 108 (19)–108 (17)	Im (KOR); W 113–111	Serrano (MEX); L 106–113	Did not advance		
Brady Ellison; Butch Johnson; Vic Wunderle	Men's team	1969	10	—N/a		Chinese Taipei; L 218–222	Did not advance			
Khatuna Lorig	Women's individual	635	26	Arnold (FRA); W 107–105	Williamson (GBR); W 112–109	Rendón (COL); W 107–95	Yun (KOR); L 105–111	Did not advance		
Jennifer Nichols	Women's individual	637	24	Rochmawati (INA); W 114–101	Hayakawa (JPN); L 103–105	Did not advance				

== Athletics (track and field) ==
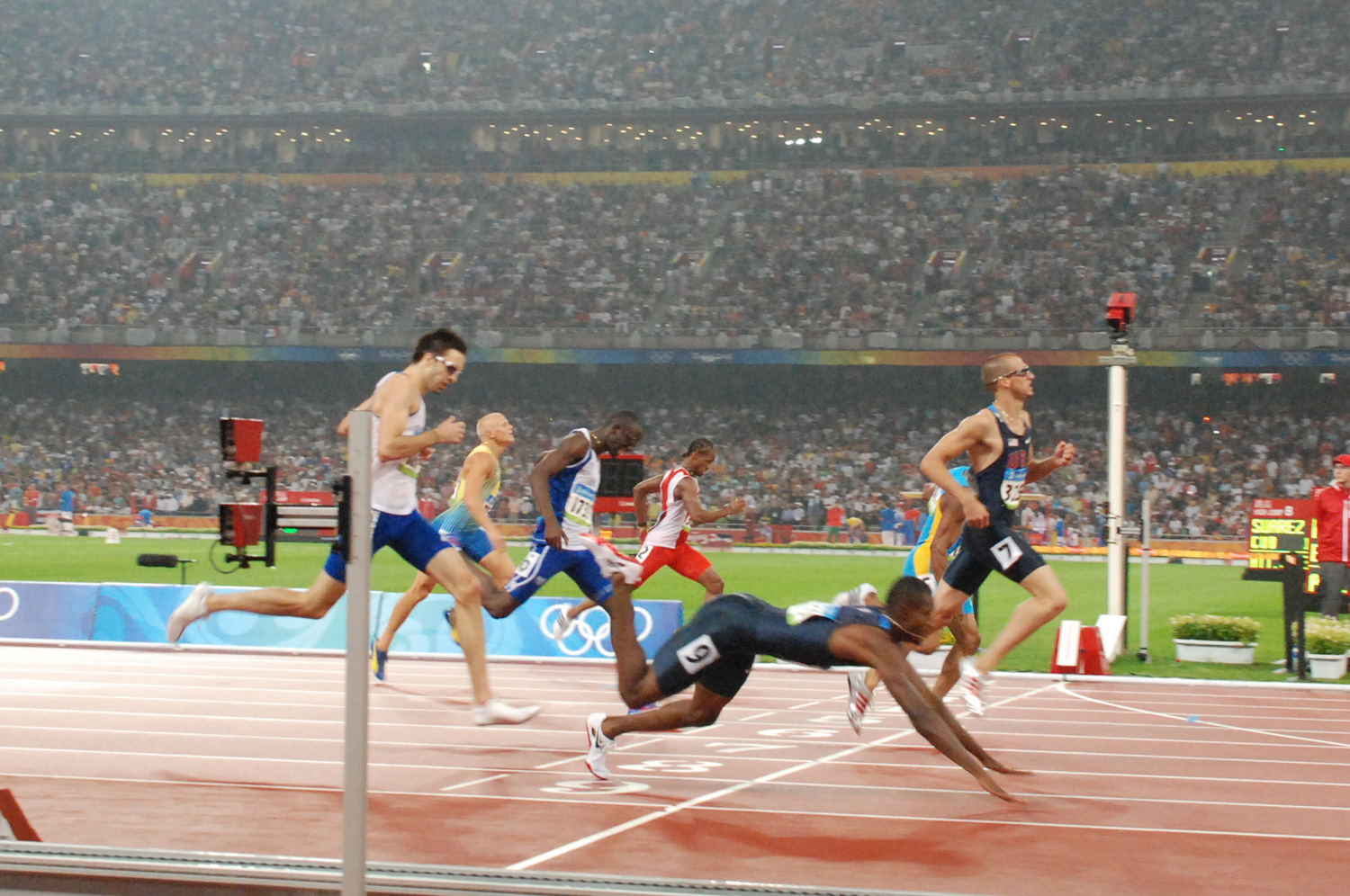
American David Neville falls at the finish line for the bronze medal as Jeremy Wariner takes second place behind LaShawn Merritt, completing a sweep of the 400 m final.

The 2008 U.S. Olympic Track & Field Trials were held in Eugene, Oregon, at the University of Oregon's Hayward Field from June 27 through July 6, 2008. Hayward Field had previously hosted the U.S. Olympic Trials in 1972, 1976 and 1980.

Key

- Note–Ranks given for track events are within the athlete's heat only
- Q = Qualified for the next round
- q = Qualified for the next round as a fastest loser or, in field events, by position without achieving the qualifying target
- NR = National record
- N/A = Round not applicable for the event
- Bye = Athlete not required to compete in round

Men
Track & road events

Athlete	Event	Heat		Quarterfinal		Semifinal		Final	
Athlete	Event	Result	Rank	Result	Rank	Result	Rank	Result	Rank
Walter Dix	100 m	10.35	3 Q	10.08	2 Q	9.95	2 Q	9.91	3rd place, bronze medalist(s)
Tyson Gay	100 m	10.22	1 Q	10.09	2 Q	10.05	5	Did not advance	
Darvis Patton	100 m	10.25	2 Q	10.04	2 Q	10.03	4 Q	10.03	8
Shawn Crawford	200 m	20.61	1 Q	20.42	2 Q	20.12	2 Q	19.96	2nd place, silver medalist(s)
Walter Dix	200 m	20.77	2 Q	20.27	2 Q	20.19	3 Q	19.98	3rd place, bronze medalist(s)
Wallace Spearmon	200 m	20.46	1 Q	20.39	2 Q	20.14	3 Q	DSQ	
LaShawn Merritt	400 m	44.96	1 Q	—N/a		44.12	1 Q	43.75	1st place, gold medalist(s)
David Neville	400 m	45.22	2 Q	—N/a		44.91	2 Q	44.80	3rd place, bronze medalist(s)
Jeremy Wariner	400 m	45.23	1 Q	—N/a		44.15	1 Q	44.74	2nd place, silver medalist(s)
Christian Smith	800 m	1:48.20	4	—N/a		Did not advance			
Nick Symmonds	800 m	1:46.01	1 Q	—N/a		1:46.96	5	Did not advance	
Andrew Wheating	800 m	1:47.05	4	—N/a		Did not advance			
Leonel Manzano	1500 m	3:36.67	1 Q	—N/a		3:50.33	12	Did not advance	
Bernard Lagat	1500 m	3:41.98	4 Q	—N/a		3:37.79	6	Did not advance	
Lopez Lomong	1500 m	3:36.70	5 Q	—N/a		3:41.00	12	Did not advance	
Ian Dobson	5000 m	14:05.47	9	—N/a				Did not advance	
Bernard Lagat	5000 m	13:39.70	1 Q	—N/a				13:26.89	9
Matt Tegenkamp	5000 m	13:37.36	1 Q	—N/a				13:33.13	13
Abdi Abdirahman	10,000 m	—N/a						27:52.53	15
Galen Rupp	10,000 m	—N/a						27:36.99	13
Jorge Torres	10,000 m	—N/a						28:13.93	25
David Oliver	110 m hurdles	13.30	1 Q	13.16	1 Q	13.31	1 Q	13.18	3rd place, bronze medalist(s)
David Payne	110 m hurdles	13.42	1 Q	13.24	1 Q	13.21	2 Q	13.17	2nd place, silver medalist(s)
Terrence Trammell	110 m hurdles	DNF		Did not advance					
Kerron Clement	400 m hurdles	49.42	1 Q	—N/a		48.27	1 Q	47.98	2nd place, silver medalist(s)
Bershawn Jackson	400 m hurdles	49.20	1 Q	—N/a		48.02	2 Q	48.06	3rd place, bronze medalist(s)
Angelo Taylor	400 m hurdles	48.67	1 Q	—N/a		47.94	1 Q	47.25	1st place, gold medalist(s)
Anthony Famiglietti	3000 m steeplechase	8:17.34	3 Q	—N/a				8:31.21	13
Joshua McAdams	3000 m steeplechase	8:33.26	9	—N/a				Did not advance	
William Nelson	3000 m steeplechase	8:36.66	11	—N/a				Did not advance	
Tyson Gay; Rodney Martin; Travis Padgett; Darvis Patton	4 × 100 m relay	DNF		—N/a				Did not advance	
Kerron Clement^{[b]} LaShawn Merritt; David Neville; Jeremy Wariner; Angelo Taylor; Reggie Witherspoon^{[b]}	4 × 400 m relay	2:59.98	1 Q	—N/a				2:55.39 OR	1st place, gold medalist(s)
Ryan Hall	Marathon	—N/a						2:12:33	10
Dathan Ritzenhein	Marathon	—N/a						2:11:59	9
Brian Sell	Marathon	—N/a						2:16:07	22
Kevin Eastler	20 km walk	—N/a						1:28:44	43
Philip Dunn	50 km walk	—N/a						4:08:32	39

Field events

Athlete	Event	Qualification		Final	
Athlete	Event	Distance	Position	Distance	Position
Brian Johnson	Long jump	7.79	22	Did not advance	
Miguel Pate	Long jump	7.34	38	Did not advance	
Trevell Quinley	Long jump	7.87	19	Did not advance	
Kenta Bell	Triple jump	16.55	25	Did not advance	
Rafeeq Curry	Triple jump	16.88	19	Did not advance	
Aarik Wilson	Triple jump	15.97	33	Did not advance	
Dusty Jonas	High jump	2.20	=26	Did not advance	
Andra Manson	High jump	2.25	13	Did not advance	
Jesse Williams	High jump	2.25	=19	Did not advance	
Jeff Hartwig	Pole vault	5.55	=20	Did not advance	
Derek Miles	Pole vault	5.65	=9 q	5.70	3rd place, bronze medalist(s)
Brad Walker	Pole vault	NM	—	Did not advance	
Christian Cantwell	Shot put	20.48	4 Q	21.09	2nd place, silver medalist(s)
Reese Hoffa	Shot put	20.41	6 Q	20.53	6
Adam Nelson	Shot put	20.56	2 Q	NM	—
Casey Malone	Discus throw	61.26	19	Did not advance	
Michael Robertson	Discus throw	61.64	16	Did not advance	
Ian Waltz	Discus throw	60.02	25	Did not advance	
Breaux Greer	Javelin throw	73.68	22	Did not advance	
Mike Hazle	Javelin throw	72.75	25	Did not advance	
Leigh Smith	Javelin throw	76.55	18	Did not advance	
AG Kruger	Hammer throw	71.21	27	Did not advance	

Combined events – Decathlon

Athlete	Event	100 m	LJ	SP	HJ	400 m	110H	DT	PV	JT	1500 m	Final	Rank
Bryan Clay	Result	10.44	7.78	16.27	1.99	48.92	13.94	53.79	5.00	70.97	5:06.59	8791	1st place, gold medalist(s)
Bryan Clay	Points	989	1005	868	794	865	984	950	910	904	522	8791	1st place, gold medalist(s)
Trey Hardee	Result	10.52	7.72	13.49	2.05	47.75	14.20	44.35	NM	DNS		DNF	
Trey Hardee	Points	970	990	697	850	921	949	737	0	DNS		DNF	
Tom Pappas	Result	11.12	7.41	DNS								DNF	
Tom Pappas	Points	834	913	DNS								DNF	

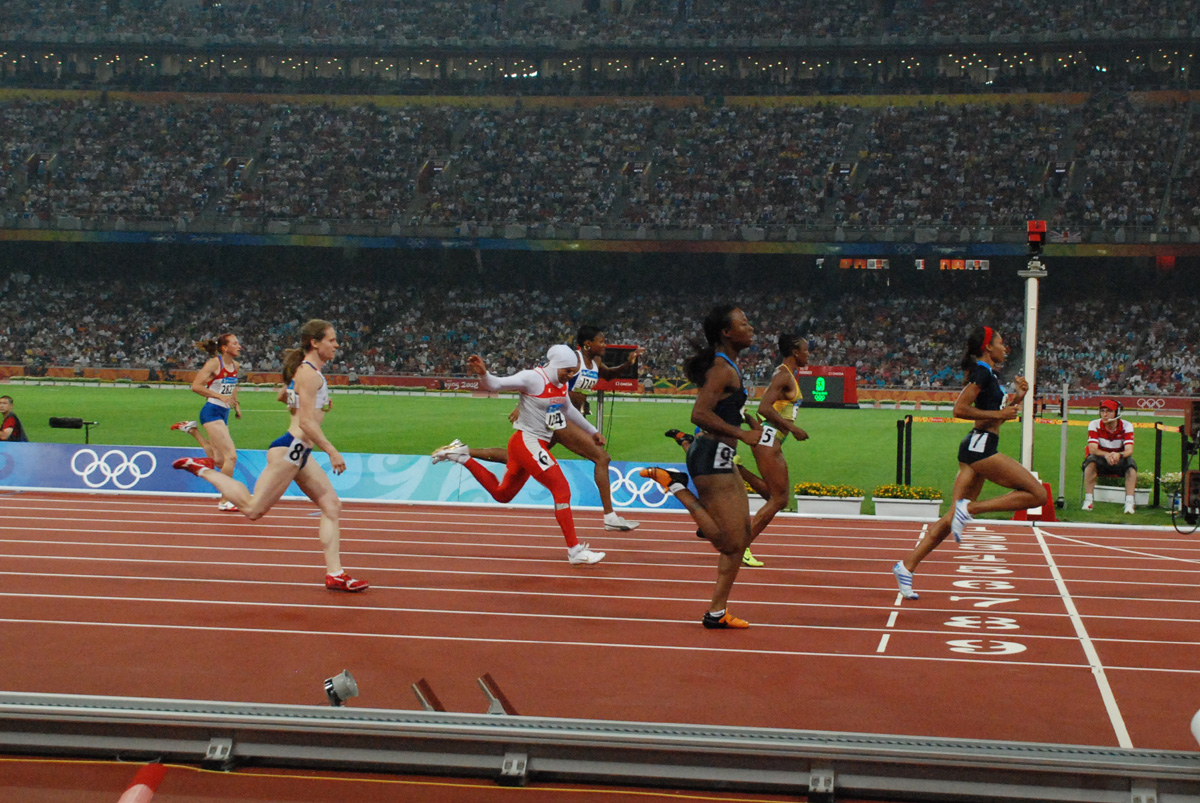
American Allyson Felix crosses the finish line for a first-place finish in the second 200 m semifinal.

Women
Track & road events

Athlete	Event	Heat		Quarterfinal		Semifinal		Final	
Athlete	Event	Result	Rank	Result	Rank	Result	Rank	Result	Rank
Torri Edwards	100 m	11.26	1 Q	11.31	1 Q	11.18	2 Q	11.20	8
Muna Lee	100 m	11.33	1 Q	11.08	2 Q	11.06	2 Q	11.07	5
Lauryn Williams	100 m	11.38	2 Q	11.07	2 Q	11.10	3 Q	11.03	4
Allyson Felix	200 m	23.02	1 Q	22.74	2 Q	22.33	1 Q	21.93	2nd place, silver medalist(s)
Marshevet Hooker	200 m	23.07	1 Q	22.76	3 Q	22.50	2 Q	22.34	5
Muna Lee	200 m	22.71	1 Q	22.83	2 Q	22.29	3 Q	22.01	4
Sanya Richards	400 m	50.54	1 Q	—N/a		49.90	1 Q	49.93	3rd place, bronze medalist(s)
DeeDee Trotter	400 m	51.41	4 Q	—N/a		51.87	7	Did not advance	
Mary Wineberg	400 m	51.46	2 Q	—N/a		51.13	5	Did advance	
Hazel Clark	800 m	2:01.59	5	—N/a		Did advance			
Alice Schmidt	800 m	2:02.33	6	—N/a		Did not advance			
Nicole Teter	800 m	DNF		—N/a		Did not advance			
Erin Donohue	1500 m	4:16.05	8	—N/a				Did not advance	
Shannon Rowbury	1500 m	4:03.89	4 Q	—N/a				4:03.58	7
Christin Wurth-Thomas	1500 m	4:09.70	8	—N/a				Did not advance	
Shalane Flanagan	5000 m	14:59.69	6 Q	—N/a				15:50.80	10
Kara Goucher	5000 m	15:00.98	7 Q	—N/a				15:49.39	9
Jennifer Rhines	5000 m	15:15.12	6 Q	—N/a				16:34.63	14
Amy Yoder Begley	10,000 m	—N/a						32:38.28	26
Shalane Flanagan	10,000 m	—N/a						30:22.22	2nd place, silver medalist(s)
Kara Goucher	10,000 m	—N/a						30:55.16	10
Damu Cherry	100 m hurdles	12.92	3 Q	—N/a		12.62	1 Q	12.65	4
Dawn Harper	100 m hurdles	12.73	2 Q	—N/a		12.66	2 Q	12.54	1st place, gold medalist(s)
Lolo Jones	100 m hurdles	12.71	1 Q	—N/a		12.43	1 Q	12.72	7
Queen Harrison	400 m hurdles	55.96	4 Q	—N/a		55.88	7	Did not advance	
Sheena Tosta	400 m hurdles	56.12	5 Q	—N/a		54.07	1 Q	53.70	2nd place, silver medalist(s)
Tiffany Williams	400 m hurdles	55.51	1 Q	—N/a		54.99	3 Q	57.55	8
Lindsey Anderson	3000 m steeplechase	9:36.81	8	—N/a				Did not advance	
Jennifer Barringer	3000 m steeplechase	9:29.20	3 Q	—N/a				9:22.26	9
Anna Willard	3000 m steeplechase	9:28.52	6 Q	—N/a				9:25.63	10
Torri Edwards; Mechelle Lewis; Angela Williams; Lauryn Williams	4 × 100 m relay	DSQ		—N/a				Did not advance	
Allyson Felix; Natasha Hastings^{[b]} Monique Henderson; Sanya Richards; Mary Wineberg	4 × 400 m relay	3:33.45	1 Q	—N/a				3:18.54	1st place, gold medalist(s)
Deena Kastor	Marathon	—N/a						DNF	
Magdalena Lewy Boulet	Marathon	—N/a						DNF	
Blake Russell	Marathon	—N/a						2:33:13	27
Joanne Dow	20 km walk	—N/a						1:34.15	31

^{b} Athlete that participated in the heat only.

Field events

Athlete	Event	Qualification		Final	
Athlete	Event	Distance	Position	Distance	Position
Funmi Jimoh	Long jump	6.61	=9 q	6.29	12
Brittney Reese	Long jump	6.87	1 Q	6.76	5
Grace Upshaw	Long jump	6.68	6 Q	6.58	8
Shani Marks	Triple jump	13.44	28	Did not advance	
Erica McLain	Triple jump	13.52	26	Did not advance	
Amy Acuff	High jump	1.89	=19	Did not advance	
Sharon Day	High jump	1.85	=24	Did not advance	
Chaunte Howard	High jump	1.93	=8 q	1.99	3rd place, bronze medalist(s)
Erica Bartolina	Pole vault	NM	—	Did not advance	
April Steiner Bennett	Pole vault	4.50	=6 q	4.55	8
Jennifer Stuczynski	Pole vault	4.50	=2 q	4.80	2nd place, silver medalist(s)
Jillian Camarena	Shot put	18.51	12 Q	18.24	12
Michelle Carter	Shot put	18.49	13 Q	17.74	15
Kristin Heaston	Shot put	17.34	23	Did not advance	
Suzy Powell-Roos	Discus throw	58.02	26	Did not advance	
Aretha Thurmond	Discus throw	61.90	6 Q	59.80	10
Stephanie Brown Trafton	Discus throw	62.77	1 Q	64.74	1st place, gold medalist(s)
Kim Kreiner	Javelin throw	55.13	38	Did not advance	
Kara Patterson	Javelin throw	54.39	41	Did not advance	
Amber Campbell	Hammer throw	67.86	21	Did not advance	
Jessica Cosby	Hammer throw	NM	—	Did not advance	
Loree Smith	Hammer throw	63.60	39	Did not advance	

Combined events – Heptathlon

Athlete	Event	100H	HJ	SP	200 m	LJ	JT	800 m	Final	Rank
Hyleas Fountain	Result	12.78	1.89	13.36	23.21	6.38	41.93	2:15.45	6619	(silver) ^{[c]}
Hyleas Fountain	Points	1158	1093	751	1058	1058	704	886	6619	(silver) ^{[c]}
Jacquelyn Johnson	Result	13.22	1.77	11.82	24.74	5.88	DNS		DNF	
Jacquelyn Johnson	Points	1091	941	649	911	911	DNS		DNF	
Diana Pickler	Result	14.28	DNS						DNF	
Diana Pickler	Points	939	DNS						DNF	

^{c} The athlete who finished in second place, Lyudmila Blonska of Ukraine, tested positive for a banned substance. On August 22, Blonska was stripped of her medal and Hyleas Fountain was upgraded to silver.

== Badminton ==
The United States was represented in four out of the five badminton events: men's singles, men's doubles, women's singles and women's doubles. The U.S. had qualified a mixed doubles team, but the Badminton World Federation rescinded the slot. No American has ever medaled in badminton since it became an Olympic sport in 1992, although Howard Bach and Bob Malaythong became the first Americans to reach the quarter-finals.

Athlete	Event	Round of 64	Round of 32	Round of 16	Quarterfinal	Semifinal	Final / BM	
Athlete	Event	Opposition Score	Opposition Score	Opposition Score	Opposition Score	Opposition Score	Opposition Score	Rank
Raju Rai	Men's singles	Bye	Lång (FIN); L 9–21, 16–21	Did not advance				
Howard Bach; Bob Malaythong	Men's doubles	—N/a		C Dednam / R Dednam (RSA); W 21–10, 21–16	Cai / Fu (CHN); L 9–21, 10–21	Did not advance		
Eva Lee	Women's singles	Rice (CAN); L 15–21, 21–19, 19–21	Did not advance					
Eva Lee; Mesinee Mangkalakiri	Women's doubles	—N/a		Jiang / Li (SIN); L 12–21, 12–21	Did not advance			

== Baseball ==
The United States earned a qualification spot in baseball by placing in the top two at the 2006 Americas Olympic Qualifying Event. This marked the return of the United States national baseball team to the Olympics after not qualifying in 2004; the United States had appeared in all three of the official baseball tournaments, and nearly all of the exhibition and demonstration events, before then. The American team sought its second gold medal in the sport, but finished winning the bronze.

Baseball was open only to male amateurs in 1992 and 1996. As a result, the Americans and other nations where professional baseball is developed relied on collegiate players, while Cubans used their most experienced veterans, who technically were considered amateurs as they nominally held other jobs, but in fact trained full-time. In 2000, pros were admitted, but the MLB refused to release its players in 2000, 2004, and 2008, and the situation changed only a little: the Cubans still used their best players, while the Americans started using minor leaguers. The IOC cited the absence of the best players as the main reason for baseball being dropped from the Olympic program.

Summary

Team	Event	Preliminary round								Semifinal	Final / BM	
Team	Event	Opposition Score	Opposition Score	Opposition Score	Opposition Score	Opposition Score	Opposition Score	Opposition Score	Rank	Opposition Score	Opposition Score	Rank
United States men	Men's tournament	South Korea; L 7–8	Netherlands; W 7–0	Cuba; L 4–5	Canada; W 5–4	China; W 9–1	Chinese Taipei; W 4–2	Japan; W 4–2	3 Q	Cuba; L 2–10	Bronze medal final Japan; W 8–4	3rd place, bronze medalist(s)

Team roster and tournament statistics

USA Baseball named its Olympic roster on July 16, 2008. The Olympic team was made up of professionals not on a Major League Baseball 25-man roster at the time of the tournament, because the MLB once again refused to take an Olympic break. The IOC named that as one of the reasons for removing baseball from the program.

Manager: Davey Johnson, Bob Watson (General Manager)

Coaches: Marcel Lachemann – Pitching Coach, Reggie Smith – Hitting Coach, Rick Eckstein – 3rd Base Coach, Dick Cooke – Auxiliary Coach, Rolando de Armas – Auxiliary Coach.

Batting
No.	Player	Pos	GP	AB	R	H	HR	RBI	TB	BB	SO	SB	OBP	SLG	BA
2	Jason Donald	SS	8	21	4	8	1	5	12	5	3	1	.536	.571	.381
3	Jayson Nix	2B	3	14	3	3	1	1	7	1	4	0	.267	.500	.214
6	Lou Marson	C	5	13	3	4	0	0	4	3	3	0	.438	.308	.308
7	John Gall	LF	8	33	5	8	1	5	15	2	7	0	.286	.455	.242
10	Mike Hessman	3B	5	22	2	2	1	1	5	0	11	0	.091	.227	.091
14	Nate Schierholtz	CF	9	37	7	8	1	6	15	2	9	0	.275	.405	.216
17	Matthew Brown	1B	9	32	4	9	2	10	18	6	8	2	.390	.563	.281
18	Brian Barden	SS	9	34	8	9	1	5	15	4	9	1	.342	.441	.265
19	Taylor Teagarden	C	5	16	2	3	0	4	5	4	8	0	.381	.313	.188
24	Dexter Fowler	PR	9	28	5	7	0	2	12	2	4	0	.300	.429	.250
26	Terry Tiffee	DH	9	37	4	12	0	5	18	2	6	0	.341	.486	.324
44	Matthew LaPorta	RF	6	19	3	3	2	4	9	3	8	0	.333	.474	.158
Team totals			9	306	50	76	10	48	135	34	80	4	.333	.441	.248

Pos – Position; GP – Games played; AB – At Bat; R – Runs; H – Hits; HR – Home Runs; RBI – Runs Batted In; TB – Total Bases; BB – Base On Balls; SO – Strikeouts; SB – Stolen Bases; OBP – On-Base Percentage; SLG – Slugging Percentage; BA – Batting Average

Pitching
No.	Player	GP	GS	W	L	SV	IP	H	R	HR	SO	BB	ERA
15	Brandon Knight	2	2	1	0	0	10.2	13	8	2	7	4	6.75
21	Mike Koplove	4	0	0	0	0	5.1	0	0	0	6	1	0.00
29	Stephen Strasburg	2	2	1	1	0	11	7	3	1	16	1	1.64
30	Trevor Cahill	2	2	0	0	0	8	6	2	0	5	5	2.25
34	Jake Arrieta	1	1	1	0	0	6	2	0	0	7	2	0.00
35	Casey Weathers	3	0	0	0	1	3	3	2	0	5	1	0.00
37	Jeff Stevens	4	0	1	2	0	4	6	7	1	2	1	9.00
39	Kevin Jepsen	4	0	0	0	1	5.2	3	0	0	5	2	0.00
40	Brett Anderson	2	2	1	0	0	12.2	13	8	2	10	3	4.98
45	Brian Duensing	4	0	1	0	0	7.2	3	1	1	5	2	1.17
47	Jeremy Cummings	2	0	0	0	0	5	3	1	1	2	0	1.80
49	Blaine Neal	3	0	0	0	0	3.2	5	4	2	2	0	7.38
Team totals		9	9	6	3	2	82.2	64	36	10	72	22	3.05

GP – Games played; GS – Games Started; W – Wins; L – Losses; SV – Saves; IP – Innings Pitched; H – Hits; R – Runs; HR – Home Runs; SO – Strikeouts; BB – Base On Balls; ERA – Earned Run Average

Group stage
All times are China Standard Time (UTC+8)

Pos	Team	Pld	W	L	RF	RA	RD	PCT	GB	Qualification
1	South Korea	7	7	0	41	22	+19	1.000	—	Advance to knockout round
2	Cuba	7	6	1	52	23	+29	.857	1	Advance to knockout round
3	United States	7	5	2	40	22	+18	.714	2	Advance to knockout round
4	Japan	7	4	3	30	14	+16	.571	3	Advance to knockout round
5	Chinese Taipei	7	2	5	29	33	−4	.286 (Note: Chinese Taipei defeated Canada 6–5.)	5	
6	Canada	7	2	5	29	20	+9	.286	5	
7	Netherlands	7	1	6	9	50	−41	.143 (Note: Netherlands defeated China 6–4.)	6	
8	China (H)	7	1	6	14	60	−46	.143	6	

(H) Hosts
Notes:

Team	1	2	3	4	5	6	7	8	9	R	H	E
United States	1	0	0	0	2	1	0	0	3	7	12	1
South Korea	0	2	1	0	3	0	0	0	2	8	9	1
WP: Suk-Min Yoon (1-0) LP: Jeff Stevens (0-1); Home runs: USA: Nate Schierholtz (1), Mike Hessman (1); KOR: Dae-Ho Lee (1)

Team	1	2	3	4	5	6	7	8	9	10	11	R	H	E
Cuba	2	0	0	0	0	0	0	1	0	0	2	5	10	0
United States	0	0	0	2	0	0	0	1	0	0	1	4	6	0
WP: Pedro Luis Lazo (1-0) LP: Jeff Stevens (0-2); Home runs: CUB: Alfredo Despaigne (2); USA: Jayson Nix (1)

Team	1	2	3	4	5	6	7	8	9	R	H	E
China	0	0	0	0	0	0	0	0	1	1	4	1
United States	1	0	0	0	3	1	4	0	X	9	9	0
WP: Jake Arrieta (1-0) LP: Chenhao Li (0-1); Home runs: CHN: Yang Yang (1); USA: None

Team	1	2	3	4	5	6	7	8	9	10	11	R	H	E
United States	0	0	0	0	0	0	0	0	0	0	4	4	5	0
Japan	0	0	0	0	0	0	0	0	0	0	2	2	5	0
WP: Jeff Stevens (1-2) LP: Hitoki Iwase (0-2) Sv: Casey Weathers (1)

Team	1	2	3	4	5	6	7	8	9	R	H	E
United States	0	1	0	4	0	0	1	1	-	7	10	0
Netherlands	0	0	0	0	0	0	0	0	-	0	1	0
WP: Stephen Strasburg (1-0) LP: Shairon Martis (0-1); Home runs: USA: Matt Brown (1), Matt Laporta (1); NED: None

Team	1	2	3	4	5	6	7	8	9	R	H	E
Canada	0	1	2	1	0	0	0	0	0	4	10	1
United States	0	0	0	2	1	0	2	0	X	5	9	1
WP: Brian Duensing (1-0) LP: Chris Reitsma (0-1); Home runs: CAN: None; USA: Brian Barden (1)

Team	1	2	3	4	5	6	7	8	9	R	H	E
Chinese Taipei	0	0	0	0	1	0	1	0	0	2	5	0
United States	0	0	0	0	1	2	0	1	X	4	10	2
WP: Brandon Knight (1-0) LP: Wen-Hsiung Hsu (0-1) Sv: Kevin Jepsen (1); Home runs: TPE: Chih-Sheng Lin (1); USA: John Gall (1)

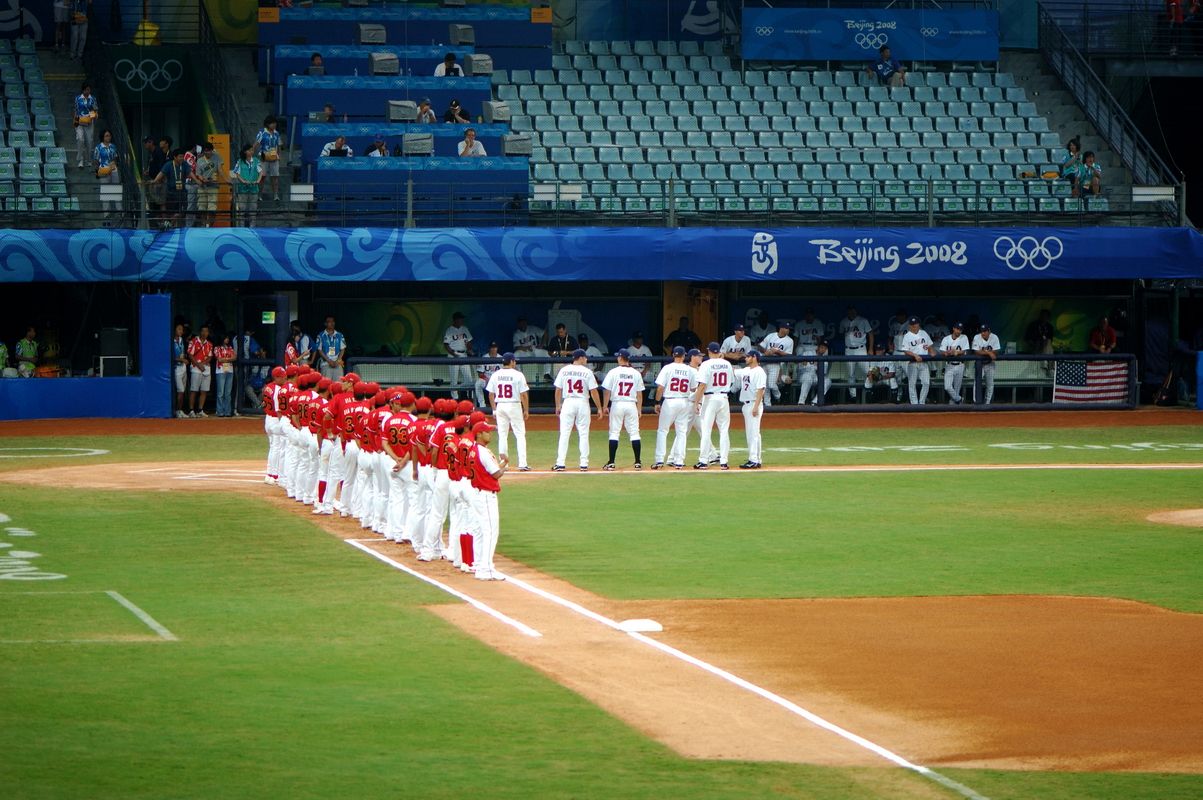
China vs USA baseball on August 18, 2008.

Semifinal

Team	1	2	3	4	5	6	7	8	9	R	H	E
United States	0	0	0	1	1	0	0	0	0	2	6	2
Cuba	0	0	2	1	0	1	0	6	X	10	14	2
WP: Norge Luis Vera (2-0) LP: Stephen Strasburg (1-1) Sv: Pedro Luis Lazo (2); Home runs: USA: None; CUB: Alfredo Despaigne (3), Frederich Cepeda (2), Alexei Bell (1), Ariel Pestano (2)

Bronze medal game

Team	1	2	3	4	5	6	7	8	9	R	H	E
Japan	1	0	3	0	0	0	0	0	0	4	6	1
United States	0	1	3	0	4	0	0	0	X	8	9	0
WP: Brett Anderson (1-0) LP: Kenshin Kawakami (0-1); Home runs: JPN: Masahiro Araki (1), Norichika Aoki (1); USA: Matt LaPorta (2), Matt Brown (2), Jason Donald (1)

== Basketball ==
The United States earned qualification spots for both men's and women's basketball by winning the FIBA Americas Championship 2007 and the FIBA Americas Championship for Women 2007.

The women's team successfully defended their 2004 Olympic championship against Australia in the gold medal game for the third consecutive Olympics. The victory allowed Lisa Leslie to join former teammate Teresa Edwards as the only basketball players to win four Olympic gold medals. After a disappointing third-place finish in Athens, the men's team adopted the name "Redeem Team". In the gold medal match, they beat 2006 FIBA World Champion Spain to give the U.S. its first gold medal in men's international competition in eight years.

Summary

Team	Event	Group stage						Quarterfinal	Semifinal	Final / BM	
Team	Event	Opposition Score	Opposition Score	Opposition Score	Opposition Score	Opposition Score	Rank	Opposition Score	Opposition Score	Opposition Score	Rank
United States men	Men's tournament	China; W 101–70	Angola; W 97–76	Greece; W 92–69	Spain; W 119–82	Germany; W 106–57	1 Q	Australia; W 116–85	Argentina; W 101–81	Spain; W 118–107	1st place, gold medalist(s)
United States women	Women's tournament	Czech Republic; W 97–57	China; W 108–63	Mali; W 97–41	Spain; W 93–55	New Zealand; W 96–60	1 Q	South Korea; W 104–60	Russia; W 67–52	Australia; W 92–65	1st place, gold medalist(s)

=== Men's tournament ===
Roster
The following is the United States roster in the men's basketball tournament of the 2008 Summer Olympics.

United States men's national basketball team – 2008 Summer Olympics roster
Players
Coaches

Pos.	No.	Name	Age – Date of birth	Height	Club	Ctr.
F	4	Carlos Boozer	26 – November 20, 1981	6 ft 8 in (2.03 m)	Utah Jazz	(United States)
G	5	Jason Kidd	35 – March 23, 1973	6 ft 4 in (1.93 m)	Dallas Mavericks	(United States)
F	6	LeBron James	23 – December 30, 1984	6 ft 8 in (2.03 m)	Cleveland Cavaliers	(United States)
G	7	Deron Williams	24 – June 26, 1984	6 ft 3 in (1.91 m)	Utah Jazz	(United States)
G	8	Michael Redd	28 – August 24, 1979	6 ft 6 in (1.98 m)	Milwaukee Bucks	(United States)
G	9	Dwyane Wade	26 – January 17, 1982	6 ft 4 in (1.93 m)	Miami Heat	(United States)
G	10	Kobe Bryant (C)	29 – August 23, 1978	6 ft 6 in (1.98 m)	Los Angeles Lakers	(United States)
C	11	Dwight Howard	22 – December 8, 1985	6 ft 11 in (2.11 m)	Orlando Magic	(United States)
F/C	12	Chris Bosh	24 – March 24, 1984	6 ft 11 in (2.11 m)	Toronto Raptors	(Canada)
G	13	Chris Paul	23 – May 6, 1985	6 ft 0 in (1.83 m)	New Orleans Hornets	(United States)
F	14	Tayshaun Prince	28 – February 28, 1980	6 ft 9 in (2.06 m)	Detroit Pistons	(United States)
F	15	Carmelo Anthony	24 – May 29, 1984	6 ft 7 in (2.01 m)	Denver Nuggets	(United States)

Head coach

- (United States) Mike Krzyzewski

Assistant coach(es)

- (United States) Jim Boeheim
- (United States) Nate McMillan
- (United States) Mike D'Antoni

Legend

- (C) Team captain
- Club – describes last
  club before the tournament
- Age – describes age
  on August 9, 2008

Group play

Pos	Team	Pld	W	L	PF	PA	PD	Pts	Qualification
1	United States	5	5	0	515	354	+161	10	Quarterfinals
2	Spain	5	4	1	418	369	+49	9	Quarterfinals
3	Greece	5	3	2	415	375	+40	8	Quarterfinals
4	China (H)	5	2	3	366	400	−34	7	Quarterfinals
5	Germany	5	1	4	330	390	−60	6	
6	Angola	5	0	5	321	477	−156	5	

Source: FIBA archive
Rules for classification: 1) points; 2) head-to-head points; 3) head-to-head goal average; 4) head-to-head number of points scored.
(H) Hosts

10 August 2008
22:15

Report

United States	101–70	China
Scoring by quarter: 20–16, 29–21, 25–11, 27–22
Pts: Wade 19; Rebs: Bosh 8 Asts: Paul 6		Pts: Yao 13; Rebs: Yao 10; Asts: Chen, Liu, Zhu, Sun 2

Wukesong Indoor Stadium, Beijing
Attendance: 11,083
Referees: Carl Jungebrand (FIN)

12 August 2008
20:00

Report

Angola	76–97	United States
Scoring by quarter: 18–29, 19–26, 16–26, 23–16
Pts: Morais 24; Rebs: Gomes 8 Asts: Costa, Ambrosio 2		Pts: Wade 19; Rebs: Anthony 6 Asts: James 5

Wukesong Indoor Stadium, Beijing
Attendance: 11,083
Referees: Pablo Estévez (ARG)

14 August 2008
20:00

Report

United States	92–69	Greece
Scoring by quarter: 20–16, 31–16, 23–22, 18–15
Pts: Bryant, Bosh 18; Rebs: James, Howard, Anthony 6 Asts: James 6		Pts: Papaloukas 15; Rebs: Fotsis, Papaloukas 8 Asts: Diamantidis 3

Wukesong Indoor Stadium, Beijing
Attendance: 11,083
Referees: Romualdas Brazauskas (LTU)

16 August 2008
22:15

Report

Spain	82–119	United States
Scoring by quarter: 22–31, 23–30, 18–25, 19–33
Pts: Reyes 19; Rebs: Reyes 8 Asts: Fernández, Rubio 3		Pts: James 18; Rebs: Bosh 7 Asts: James, Paul 8

Wukesong Indoor Stadium, Beijing
Attendance: 11,083
Referees: Romualdas Brazauskas (LTU)

18 August 2008
20:00

Report

United States	106–57	Germany
Scoring by quarter: 31–12, 22–17, 30–17, 23–11
Pts: Howard 22; Rebs: Howard 10; Asts: Williams 5		Pts: Nowitzki 14; Rebs: Nowitzki 8 Asts: Hamann, Jagla 2

Wukesong Indoor Stadium, Beijing
Attendance: 11,083
Referees: Juan Carlos Arteaga (ESP)

Quarterfinal

20 August 2008
20:00

Report

United States	116–85	Australia
Scoring by quarter: 25–24, 30–19, 34–18, 27–24
Scoring by half: 55–43, 61–42
Pts: Bryant 25; Rebs: James 9 Asts: James, Paul, Wade, Williams 3		Pts: Mills 20; Rebs: Worthington 6 Asts: Newley 3

Wukesong Indoor Stadium, Beijing
Attendance: 11,083
Referees: Juan Carlos Arteaga (ESP)

Semifinal

22 August 2008
22:00

Report

Argentina	81–101	United States
Scoring by quarter: 11–30, 29–19, 24–29, 17–23
Scoring by half: 40–49, 41–52
Pts: Scola 28; Rebs: Scola 11; Asts: Prigioni 3		Pts: Anthony 21; Rebs: Bosh 10; Asts: Kidd 7

Wukesong Indoor Stadium, Beijing
Attendance: 11,083
Referees: Luigi Lamonica (ITA)

Gold medal game

24 August 2008
14:00

Report

(silver) Spain	107–118	United States (gold)
Scoring by quarter: 31–38, 30–31, 21–22, 25–27
Scoring by half: 61–69, 46–49
Pts: Fernández 22; Rebs: Reyes 7 Asts: Navarro 4		Pts: Wade 27; Rebs: Bosh 7 Asts: Bryant 6

Wukesong Indoor Stadium, Beijing
Attendance: 11,083
Referees: Romualdas Brazauskas (LTU), Pablo Estévez (ARG), Carl Jungebrand (FIN)

=== Women's tournament ===
Roster
The following is the United States roster in the women's basketball tournament of the 2008 Summer Olympics.

United States women's national basketball team – 2008 Summer Olympics roster
Players
Coaches

Pos.	No.	Name	Age – Date of birth	Height	Club	Ctr.
F	5	Seimone Augustus	24 – April 30, 1984	6 ft 1 in (1.85 m)	Minnesota Lynx	(United States)
G	6	Sue Bird	27 – October 16, 1980	5 ft 9 in (1.75 m)	Seattle Storm	(United States)
F	10	Tamika Catchings	29 – July 21, 1979	6 ft 0 in (1.83 m)	Indiana Fever	(United States)
C	13	Sylvia Fowles	23 – June 10, 1985	6 ft 6 in (1.98 m)	Chicago Sky	(United States)
G	7	Kara Lawson	27 – February 14, 1981	5 ft 8 in (1.73 m)	Sacramento Monarchs	(United States)
C	9	Lisa Leslie	36 – July 7, 1972	6 ft 5 in (1.96 m)	Los Angeles Sparks	(United States)
F	8	DeLisha Milton-Jones	33 – September 11, 1974	6 ft 1 in (1.85 m)	Los Angeles Sparks	(United States)
G/F	15	Candace Parker	22 – April 19, 1986	6 ft 4 in (1.93 m)	Los Angeles Sparks	(United States)
G	4	Cappie Pondexter	25 – January 7, 1983	5 ft 9 in (1.75 m)	Phoenix Mercury	(United States)
G	14	Katie Smith	34 – June 4, 1974	5 ft 11 in (1.8 m)	Detroit Shock	(United States)
G/F	12	Diana Taurasi	26 – June 11, 1982	6 ft 0 in (1.83 m)	Phoenix Mercury	(United States)
F	11	Tina Thompson	33 – February 10, 1975	6 ft 2 in (1.88 m)	Houston Comets	(United States)

Head coach

- (United States) Anne Donovan

Assistant coach(es)

- (United States) Gail Goestenkors
- (United States) Dawn Staley
- (United States) Mike Thibault

Legend

- (C) Team captain
- Club – describes last
  club before the tournament
- Age – describes age
  on August 9, 2008

Group play

Pos	Team	Pld	W	L	PF	PA	PD	Pts	Qualification
1	United States	5	5	0	491	276	+215	10	Quarterfinals
2	China (H)	5	4	1	358	346	+12	9	Quarterfinals
3	Spain	5	3	2	357	324	+33	8	Quarterfinals
4	Czech Republic	5	2	3	346	356	−10	7	Quarterfinals
5	New Zealand	5	1	4	320	423	−103	6	
6	Mali	5	0	5	255	402	−147	5	

Source: FIBA archive
Rules for classification: 1) points; 2) head-to-head points; 3) head-to-head points difference; 4) head-to-head number of points scored.
(H) Hosts

9 August 2008
20:00

Report

Czech Republic	57–97	United States
Scoring by quarter: 17–22, 14–27, 13–26, 13–22
Pts: Veselá 8 Rebs: Veselá 9 Asts: Machová 4		Pts: Pondexter 12; Rebs: Fowles 14; Asts: Lawson 3

Wukesong Indoor Stadium, Beijing
Attendance: 11,083
Referees: Michael Aylen (AUS)

11 August 2008
20:00

Report

China	63–108	United States
Scoring by quarter: 11–33, 16–28, 19–20, 17–27
Pts: Miao 16; Rebs: Bian, Liu, Sui 4 Asts: Miao, Shao 3		Pts: Thompson 27; Rebs: Leslie 10; Asts: Lawson, Pondexter 5

Wukesong Indoor Stadium, Beijing
Attendance: 11,083
Referees: Romualdas Brazauskas (LTU)

13 August 2008
22:15

Report

Mali	41–97	United States
Scoring by quarter: 12–24, 16–27, 5–25, 9–21
Pts: Sininta 13; Rebs: Sissoko 7 Asts: Bagayoko 3		Pts: Leslie 16; Rebs: Fowles 6 Asts: Lawson 7

Wukesong Indoor Stadium, Beijing
Attendance: 11,083
Referees: Maogong Yang (CHN)

15 August 2008
20:00

Report

United States	93–55	Spain
Scoring by quarter: 22–17, 17–17, 23–10, 31–11
Pts: Thompson 17; Rebs: Leslie 11; Asts: Lawson, Leslie, Parker 2		Pts: Valdemoro 17; Rebs: Nicholls 5 Asts: Martínez 2

Wukesong Indoor Stadium, Beijing
Attendance: 11,083
Referees: Fabio Facchini (ITA)

17 August 2008
22:15

Report

New Zealand	60–96	United States
Scoring by quarter: 18–23, 6–27, 18–25, 18–21
Pts: Marino 17; Rebs: Harmon 7 Asts: Marino 17		Pts: Thompson 15; Rebs: Leslie, Fowles 6 Asts: Taurasi 5

Wukesong Indoor Stadium, Beijing
Attendance: 11,083
Referees: Luigi Lamonica (ITA)

Quarterfinal

19 August 2008
20:00

Report

United States	104–60	South Korea
Scoring by quarter: 25–21, 26–9, 26–9, 27–21
Pts: Fowles 26; Rebs: Fowles 14; Asts: Augustus 3		Pts: Kim 14; Rebs: Kim 5 Asts: Park 7

Wukesong Indoor Stadium, Beijing
Attendance: 11,083
Referees: Stephen Seibel (USA)

Semifinal

21 August 2008
20:00

Report

Russia	52–67	United States
Scoring by quarter: 16–13, 16–20, 8–15, 12–19
Pts: Stepanova 14; Rebs: Korstin 8 Asts: Six-way tie 1		Pts: Taurasi 21; Rebs: Fowles 10; Asts: Smith 3

Wukesong Indoor Stadium, Beijing
Attendance: 11,083
Referees: Cristiano Maranho (BRA)

Gold medal game

23 August 2008
22:00

Report

(gold) United States	92–65	Australia (silver)
Scoring by quarter: 22–15, 25–15, 22–24, 23–11
Pts: Lawson 15; Rebs: Leslie 7 Asts: Thompson 4		Pts: Jackson 20; Rebs: Jackson 10; Asts: Grima 2

Wukesong Indoor Stadium, Beijing
Attendance: 11,083
Referees: Nikolaos Zavlanos (GRE)

== Boxing ==
The United States qualified nine boxers for the Olympic boxing tournament. Five boxers (Yanez, Warren, Russell, Williams and Andrade) earned their spots at the 2007 World Championships. Ali, Molina and Wilder qualified at the first American qualifying tournament. Estrada was the last American boxer to qualify, doing so at the second American tournament. The United States did not qualify in light heavyweight or super heavyweight classes.

The U.S. boxing team suffered several early setbacks from which it never recovered. Alternate Boyd Melson withdrew with an injury. Before they arrived in Beijing, U.S. boxers were reportedly unhappy with training methods, coaching, and travel restrictions. On August 8, 2008, two-time national champion and bantamweight boxer Gary Russell Jr. forcibly withdrew from the Olympics after collapsing before his weigh-in. Under International Amateur Boxing Federation rules, the U.S. was not permitted to select another boxer to take his place. Reigning flyweight world champion Raushee Warren, America's best hope for gold, lost his opening bout to Lee Ok-Sung of South Korea. In the end, the U.S. left Beijing with one bronze won by Deontay Wilder, its worst performance in Olympic history. The U.S. had previously won a single silver in 1948 and no medals in 1908 and 1980, when it did not send a boxing team. On September 5, 2008, Dan Campbell, the national director of coaching for USA Boxing, resigned.

Athlete	Event	Round of 32	Round of 16	Quarterfinals	Semifinals	Final	
Athlete	Event	Opposition Result	Opposition Result	Opposition Result	Opposition Result	Opposition Result	Rank
Luis Yáñez	Light flyweight	de la Nieve (ESP); W 12–9	Serdamba (MGL); L 7–8	Did not advance			
Raushee Warren	Flyweight	Lee (KOR); L 8–9	Did not advance				
Raynell Williams	Featherweight	di Savino (ITA); W 9–1	Djelkhir (FRA); L 7–9	Did not advance			
Sadam Ali	Lightweight	Popescu (ROU); L 5–20	Did not advance				
Javier Molina	Light welterweight	Georgiev (BUL); L 1–14	Did not advance				
Demetrius Andrade	Welterweight	Jvania (GEO); W 11–9	Balanov (RUS); W 14–3	Kim (KOR); L 9–11	Did not advance		
Shawn Estrada	Middleweight	Maderna (ARG); W 10–2	DeGale (GBR); L 5–11	Did not advance			
Deontay Wilder	Heavyweight	—N/a	Touilbini (ALG); W 10–4	Arjaoui (MAR); W 10^{+}–10	Russo (ITA); L 1–7	Did not advance	3rd place, bronze medalist(s)

== Canoeing ==
=== Slalom ===
The Augsburg World Cup event on July 6 served as the final selection event for the Canoe-Kayak Slalom team. The United States qualified in all four slalom events and sent five people to compete in the slalom races.

Athlete	Event	Preliminary						Semifinal		Final			
Athlete	Event	Run 1	Rank	Run 2	Rank	Total	Rank	Time	Rank	Time	Rank	Total	Rank
Benn Fraker	Men's C-1	91.97	11	87.47	8	179.44	10 Q	92.27	8 Q	90.87	5	183.14	6
Scott Parsons	Men's K-1	84.91	3	135.63	20	220.54	20	Did not advance					
Casey Eichfeld; Rick Powell	Men's C-2	101.69	10	151.65	11	253.34	11	Did not advance					
Heather Corrie	Women's K-1	105.78	12	105.53	13	211.31	10 Q	114.51	8 Q	156.37	8	270.88	8

=== Sprint ===
The United States qualified in three out of twelve flatwater events and sent two people – one man and one woman – to compete in the flatwater sprint events at the 2008 Summer Olympics. The U.S. has not medaled in Olympic flatwater canoe and kayak racing since 1992.

Athlete	Event	Heats		Semifinals		Final	
Athlete	Event	Time	Rank	Time	Rank	Time	Rank
Rami Zur	Men's K-1 500 m	1:39.037	3 QS	1:47.163	6	Did not advance	
Rami Zur	Men's K-1 1000m	3:38.693	7 QS	3:46.204	7	Did not advance	
Carrie Johnson	Women's K-1 500 m	1:50.221	4 QS	1:53.721	4	Did not advance	

Qualification Legend: QS = Qualify to semi-final; QF = Qualify directly to final

== Cycling ==
Most of the United States' cycling squad was announced on July 1, 2008. The team sent competitors in all four disciplines – BMX, mountain biking, road racing and track racing. The final three members of the team were announced on July 10.

=== Road ===
Men

Athlete	Event	Time	Rank
George Hincapie	Road race	6:26:25	40
Levi Leipheimer	Road race	6:24:09	11
Jason McCartney	Road race	DNF	
Christian Vande Velde	Road race	6:24:19	17
David Zabriskie	Road race	DNF	
Levi Leipheimer	Time trial	1:03:21	3rd place, bronze medalist(s)
David Zabriskie	Time trial	1:05:18	12

Women

Athlete	Event	Time	Rank
Kristin Armstrong	Road race	3:33:07	25
Amber Neben	Road race	3:33:17	33
Christine Thorburn	Road race	3:41:08	52
Kristin Armstrong	Time trial	34:51.72	1st place, gold medalist(s)
Christine Thorburn	Time trial	35:54.16	5

=== Track ===
Sprint

Athlete	Event	Qualification		Round 1	Repechage 1	Round 2	Quarterfinals	Semifinals	Final	
Athlete	Event	Time Speed (km/h)	Rank	Opposition Time Speed (km/h)	Opposition Time Speed (km/h)	Opposition Time Speed (km/h)	Opposition Time Speed (km/h)	Opposition Time Speed (km/h)	Opposition Time Speed (km/h)	Rank
Michael Blatchford	Men's sprint	10.470; 68.767	15 Q	Sireau (FRA); L	Watanabe (JPN); Zhang (CHN); L	Did not advance				
Michael Blatchford; Adam Duvendeck; Giddeon Massie	Men's team sprint	45.346; 59.542	8 Q	Great Britain; L 45.423; 59.441	—N/a				Did not advance	8
Jennie Reed	Women's sprint	11.400; 63.157	8 Q	Krupeckaitė (LTU); W 11.955; 60.225	Bye	—N/a	Kanis (NED); L	Did not advance	5th place final Sanchez (FRA); Tsylinskaya (BLR); Krupeckaitė (LTU); L	7

Pursuit

Athlete	Event	Qualification		Semifinals		Final	
Athlete	Event	Time	Rank	Opponent Results	Rank	Opponent Results	Rank
Taylor Phinney	Men's individual pursuit	4:22.860	7 Q	Roulston (NZL); 4:26.644	8	Did not advance	
Sarah Hammer	Women's individual pursuit	3:35.471	5 Q	Shanks (NZL); 3:34.237	5	Did not advance	

Keirin

Athlete	Event	1st round	Repechage	2nd round	Finals
Athlete	Event	Rank	Rank	Rank	Rank
Giddeon Massie	Men's keirin	3 R	4	Did not advance	

Omnium

Athlete	Event	Points	Laps	Rank
Bobby Lea	Men's points race	−20	−1	22
Sarah Hammer	Women's points race	Did not finish		
Michael Friedman; Bobby Lea	Men's madison	3	−4	16

=== Mountain biking ===
Athlete	Event	Time	Rank
Adam Craig	Men's cross-country	LAP (1 lap)	29
Todd Wells	Men's cross-country	LAP (3 laps)	43
Georgia Gould	Women's cross-country	1:50:51	8
Mary McConneloug	Women's cross-country	1:50:34	7

=== BMX ===
Athlete	Event	Seeding		Quarterfinals		Semifinals		Final	
Athlete	Event	Time	Rank	Points	Rank	Points	Rank	Time	Rank
Kyle Bennett	Men's BMX	36.421	12	14	4 Q	14	6	Did not advance	
Mike Day	Men's BMX	35.692	1	3	1 Q	5	1 Q	36.606	2nd place, silver medalist(s)
Donny Robinson	Men's BMX	36.810	24	11	3 Q	10	3 Q	36.972	3rd place, bronze medalist(s)
Jill Kintner	Women's BMX	37.913	7	—N/a		9	2 Q	38.647	3rd place, bronze medalist(s)

== Diving ==
The United States finalized its nomination process for the Olympic diving squad on July 7, 2008. For the first time since 1996, the U.S. diving team qualified for all individual and synchronized events. It became a major power in the Olympics from 1904 to 2000, winning 47 of 90 gold medals, but left out of the medals for the second consecutive Olympics.

Men

Athlete	Event	Preliminaries		Semifinals		Final	
Athlete	Event	Points	Rank	Points	Rank	Points	Rank
Chris Colwill	3 m springboard	464.75	7 Q	480.95	6 Q	425.90	12
Troy Dumais	3 m springboard	448.40	12 Q	463.15	10 Q	472.50	6
David Boudia	10 m platform	481.70	6 Q	491.55	5 Q	441.45	10
Thomas Finchum	10 m platform	477.00	7 Q	474.95	7 Q	412.65	12
Chris Colwill; Jevon Tarantino	3 m synchronized springboard	—N/a				410.73	4
David Boudia; Thomas Finchum	10 m synchronized platform	—N/a				440.64	5

Women

Athlete	Event	Preliminaries		Semifinals		Final	
Athlete	Event	Points	Rank	Points	Rank	Points	Rank
Nancilea Foster	3 m springboard	300.15	11 Q	338.90	4 Q	316.70	8
Christina Loukas	3 m springboard	312.60	8 Q	329.00	7 Q	315.70	9
Haley Ishimatsu	10 m platform	329.00	10 Q	292.95	14	Did not advance	
Laura Wilkinson	10 m platform	370.70	5 Q	346.10	6 Q	311.80	9
Kelci Bryant; Ariel Rittenhouse	3 m synchronized springboard	—N/a				314.40	4
Mary Beth Dunnichay; Haley Ishimatsu	10 m synchronized platform	—N/a				309.12	5

== Equestrian ==
On July 15, 2008, the United States Equestrian Federation (USEF) named the rider/horse combinations for the 2008 U.S. Olympic Team. The horses were shipped to England on July 17, placed under quarantine on July 22, 2008, and shipped to Hong Kong for the Olympic Games on July 30, 2008. Before the start of the games, Heidi White-Carty and her horse Northern Spy withdrew from the U.S. eventing team because of a veterinary issue. Karen O'Connor and her horse Mandiba took their place on the team.

The U.S. successfully defended its gold medal from Athens in the team jumping competition.

Dressage

Athlete	Horse	Event	Grand Prix		Grand Prix Special		Grand Prix Freestyle		Overall	
Athlete	Horse	Event	Score	Rank	Score	Rank	Score	Rank	Score	Rank
Courtney King-Dye	Harmony's Mythilus	Individual	70.458	7 Q	70.800	8 Q	69.550	14	~~70.175~~	DSQ^{[d]}
Debbie McDonald	Brentina	Individual	63.000	34	Did not advance					
Steffen Peters	Ravel	Individual	70.000	10 Q	71.800	4 Q	76.500	3	74.150	4
Courtney King-Dye; Debbie McDonald; Steffen Peters	See above	Team	67.819	4	—N/a				~~67.819~~	DSQ^{[d]}

^{d} King-Dye, and the US team as a whole in the team competition, were disqualified after her horse tested positive for a banned substance.

Eventing

Athlete	Horse	Event	Dressage		Cross-country			Jumping						Total	
Athlete	Horse	Event	Dressage		Cross-country			Qualifier			Final			Total	
Athlete	Horse	Event	Penalties	Rank	Penalties	Total	Rank	Penalties	Total	Rank	Penalties	Total	Rank	Penalties	Rank
Phillip Dutton	Connaught	Individual	~~40.60~~	14	19.60	60.20	14	8.00	68.20	16 Q	DSQ^{[e]}				
Becky Holder	Courageous Comet	Individual	35.70	5	82.00	117.70	48	8.00	125.70	43	Did not advance			125.70	42
Gina Miles	McKinlaigh	Individual	39.30	10	16.80	56.10	5	0.00	56.10	4 Q	0.00	56.10	2	56.10	2nd place, silver medalist(s)
Karen O'Connor	Mandiba	Individual	41.90	16	~~84.80~~	126.70	54	5.00	131.70	45	Did not advance			131.70	44
Amy Tryon	Poggio II	Individual	~~46.50~~	24	Eliminated			Did not advance							
Phillip Dutton; Becky Holder; Gina Miles; Amy Tryon; Karen O'Connor	See above	Team	115.60	3	118.40	234.00	7	16.00	250.00	7	—N/a			250.00	7

^{e} Phillip Dutton qualified for the final show jumping event round on 68.2 faults (sixteenth place) and jumped a clear round to move up to twelfth place, but was disqualified because weighted boots worn by his horse exceeded the maximum limit.

Jumping

Athlete	Horse	Event	Qualification								Final					Total	
Athlete	Horse	Event	Round 1		Round 2			Round 3			Round A		Round B			Total	
Athlete	Horse	Event	Penalties	Rank	Penalties	Total	Rank	Penalties	Total	Rank	Penalties	Rank	Penalties	Total	Rank	Penalties	Rank
Laura Kraut	Cedric	Individual	5	39	4	9	=22 Q	0	9	12 Q	8	=23	Did not advance			8	=23
Beezie Madden	Authentic	Individual	0	=1	11	11	29 Q	4	15	17 Q	0	=1 Q	4	4	=7	4	3rd place, bronze medalist(s)
Will Simpson	Carlsson vom Dach	Individual	0	=1	8	8	=16 Q	8	16	=18^{[f]}	Did not advance					16	=18^{[f]}
McLain Ward	Sapphire	Individual	0	=1	0	0	=1 Q	4	4	=2 Q	4	=11 Q	0	4	=1	4	6
Laura Kraut; Beezie Madden; Will Simpson; McLain Ward	See above	Team	—N/a								12	=1 Q	8	=20	=1	20	1st place, gold medalist(s)

^{f} Will Simpson received a qualifying score, but the US already had three other riders in the individual final.

== Fencing ==
The 2008 United States Olympic Fencing Team was announced on June 11, 2008. After the 1904 Olympics, the United States did not win an Olympic fencing gold medal until 2004. But on the first full day of Olympic competition, Mariel Zagunis, Sada Jacobson and Becca Ward swept the fencing event in women's individual saber; it was the first American sweep of an Olympic fencing event since 1904. The U.S. left Beijing with a total of six medals.

Men

Athlete	Event	Round of 64	Round of 32	Round of 16	Quarterfinal	Semifinal	Final / BM	
Athlete	Event	Opposition Score	Opposition Score	Opposition Score	Opposition Score	Opposition Score	Opposition Score	Rank
Weston Kelsey	Individual épée	Bye	Jeannet (FRA); L 11–15	Did not advance				
Gerek Meinhardt	Individual foil	—N/a	Nagaty (EGY); W 15–3	Zhu (CHN); L 9–15	Did not advance			
Timothy Morehouse	Individual sabre	Bye	Sanson (FRA); L 12–15	Did not advance				
Jason Rogers	Individual sabre	Thiam (SEN); W 15–10	Smart (USA); L 3–15	Did not advance				
Keeth Smart	Individual sabre	Bye	Rogers (USA); W 15–3	Szilágyi (HUN); W 15–10	Pillet (FRA); L 13–15	Did not advance		
Timothy Morehouse; Jason Rogers; Keeth Smart; James Williams	Team sabre	—N/a			Hungary; W 45–44	Russia; W 45–44	France; L 37–45	2nd place, silver medalist(s)

Women

Athlete	Event	Round of 64	Round of 32	Round of 16	Quarterfinal	Semifinal	Final / BM	
Athlete	Event	Opposition Score	Opposition Score	Opposition Score	Opposition Score	Opposition Score	Opposition Score	Rank
Kelley Hurley	Individual épée	—N/a	Jung (KOR); L 6–15	Did not advance				
Emily Cross	Individual foil	Bye	Su (CHN); L 7–15	Did not advance				
Erinn Smart	Individual foil	Emanuel (GBR); W 15–7	Maîtrejean (FRA); L 9–15	Did not advance				
Hanna Thompson	Individual foil	Khelfaoui (ALG); W 11–2	Golubykskyi (GER); L 5–13	Did not advance				
Emily Cross; Erinn Smart; Hanna Thompson; Doris Willette	Team foil	—N/a			Poland; W 31–30	Hungary; W 33–35	Russia; L 11–28	2nd place, silver medalist(s)
Sada Jacobson	Individual sabre	Bye	González (CUB); W 15–11	Kharlan (UKR); W 15–13	Khomrova (UKR); W 15–11	Velikaya (RUS); W 15–11	Zagunis (USA); L 8–15	2nd place, silver medalist(s)
Rebecca Ward	Individual sabre	Bye	Navarro (ESP); W 12–7	Nagy (HUN); W 15–5	Besbes (TUN); W 15–14	Zagunis (USA); L 11–15	Velikaya (RUS); W 15–14	3rd place, bronze medalist(s)
Mariel Zagunis	Individual sabre	Bye	Sassine (CAN); W 15–10	Jóźwiak (POL); W 15–13	Bao (CHN); W 15–9	Ward (USA); W 15–11	Jacobson (USA); W 15–8	1st place, gold medalist(s)
Sada Jacobson; Rebecca Ward; Dagmara Wozniak; Mariel Zagunis	Team sabre	—N/a			South Africa; W 45–8	Ukraine; L 39–45	France; W 45–38	3rd place, bronze medalist(s)

== Field hockey ==
For the first time since the 1996 Summer Olympics, the United States sent a women's field hockey team to the Olympics. The team was announced on July 3 and consisted of 16 women. The men's team failed to qualify for the Beijing games.

Summary

Team	Event	Group stage						Semifinal	Final / BM / Pl.	
Team	Event	Opposition Score	Opposition Score	Opposition Score	Opposition Score	Opposition Score	Rank	Opposition Score	Opposition Score	Rank
United States women	Women's tournament	Argentina; T 2–2	Japan; T 1–1	Germany; L 2–4	New Zealand; W 4–1	Great Britain; T 0–0	4	Did not advance	7th place match Spain; L 2–3 a.e.t.	8

=== Women's tournament ===
Roster:
The following is the American roster in the women's field hockey tournament of the 2008 Summer Olympics.

Head Coach: Lee Bodimeade

3. Angela Loy
4. Kelly Doton
7. Jesse Gey
8. Rachel Dawson
10. Tiffany Snow
13. Keli Smith
15. Dana Sensenig
17. Carrie Lingo
19. Caroline Nichols
22. Kate Barber (c)
23. Katelyn Falgowski
24. Dina Rizzo
25. Amy Tran (GK)
26. Kayla Bashore
27. Lauren Crandall
28. Lauren Powley

Reserve:

11. Sara Silvetti
16. Barbara Weinberg (GK)

Group play

Team	Pld	W	D	L	GF	GA	GD	Pts	Qualification
Germany	5	4	0	1	12	8	+4	12	Advanced to semifinals
Argentina	5	3	2	0	13	7	+6	11	Advanced to semifinals
Great Britain	5	2	2	1	7	9	−2	8	
United States	5	1	3	1	9	8	+1	6	
Japan	5	1	1	3	5	7	−2	4	
New Zealand	5	0	0	5	6	13	−7	0	

10 August 2008
18:30

Argentina	2–2	United States
Rebecchi 5', 11'	Report	Smith 18'; Loy 64'

Umpires:
Julie Ashton-Lucy (AUS)
Carol Metchette (IRL)

12 August 2008
18:00

United States	1–1	Japan
Barber 58'	Report	Chiba 12'

Umpires:
Sarah Garnett (NZL)
Lisa Roach (AUS)

14 August 2008
10:30

United States	2–4	Germany
Snow 27'; Loy 60'	Report	Keller 34'; Rinne 49'; Rodewald 55'; Kühn 64'

Umpires:
Lee Keum-ju (KOR)
Marelize de Klerk (RSA)

16 August 2008
08:30

New Zealand	1–4	United States
Galletly 37'	Report	Smith 1', 42'; Loy 12'; Bashore 47'

Umpires:
Stella Bartlema (NED)
Anne McRae (GBR)

18 August 2008
18:00

Great Britain	0–0	United States
	Report

Umpires:
Ute Conen (GER)
Lisa Roach (AUS)

7th place match

20 August 2008
11:00

Spain	3–2 (a.e.t.)	United States
Termens 8'; Huertas 68'; Ybarra 84'	Report	Sensenig 30'; Loy 59'

Umpires:
Minka Woolley (AUS)
Ute Conen (GER)

== Football (soccer) ==
The United States earned spots in Beijing for both men's and women's soccer by advancing to the finals of the CONCACAF Pre-Olympic Tournaments in March and April 2008. For the Olympic tournament, the full women's national team and the men's under-23 team (including three players over the age of 23, as per FIFA regulations) participated. The 18-player roster for the 2008 U.S. Olympic women's soccer team was announced on June 23, 2008. In the final match before the Olympics on July 16, the women's team lost leading scorer Abby Wambach after she broke her left leg in a collision with Brazilian defender Andréia Rosa. Lauren Cheney, originally selected as an alternate, replaced Wambach on the roster. The 18-player roster for the 2008 U.S. Olympic Men's Soccer Team was announced on July 17, 2008. After aggravating a hamstring injury, defender Nathan Sturgis was replaced by midfielder Dax McCarty on the Olympic roster July 24, 2008.

Despite playing without Wambach and an early first-round loss to Norway, the women's soccer team successfully defended their 2004 gold medal against Brazil in overtime; it was the third gold medal overall for the United States in women's soccer. The team had lost its previous match against Brazil 4–0 in the semifinals of the 2007 Women's World Cup.

Summary

Team	Event	Group stage				Quarterfinal	Semifinal	Final / BM	
Team	Event	Opposition Score	Opposition Score	Opposition Score	Rank	Opposition Score	Opposition Score	Opposition Score	Rank
United States men	Men's tournament	Japan; W 1–0	Netherlands; T 2–2	Nigeria; L 1–2	3	Did not advance			9
United States women	Women's tournament	Norway; W 2–0	Japan; W 1–0	New Zealand; W 4–0	1 Q	Canada; W 2–1 a.e.t.	Japan; W 4–2	Brazil; W 1–0 a.e.t	1st place, gold medalist(s)

=== Men's tournament ===
Roster
The following is the United States squad in the men's football tournament of the 2008 Summer Olympics.

Head coach: (Poland) Piotr Nowak

No.	Pos.	Player	Date of birth (age)	Caps	Goals	Club
1	GK	Chris Seitz	12 March 1987 (aged 21)	7	0	(United States Soccer Federation) Real Salt Lake
2	DF	Marvell Wynne	8 May 1986 (aged 22)	5	0	(Canadian Soccer Association) Toronto FC
3	DF	Michael Orozco	7 February 1986 (aged 22)	4	0	(Mexican Football Federation) San Luis
4	MF	Michael Bradley	31 July 1987 (aged 21)	0	0	(Royal Dutch Football Association) Heerenveen
5	MF	Dax McCarty	30 April 1987 (aged 21)	5	0	(United States Soccer Federation) FC Dallas
6	DF	Maurice Edu	18 April 1986 (aged 22)	5	0	(Canadian Soccer Association) Toronto FC
7	MF	Stuart Holden	1 August 1985 (aged 23)	6	0	(United States Soccer Federation) Houston Dynamo
8	MF	Danny Szetela	17 June 1987 (aged 21)	0	0	(Italian Football Federation) Brescia
9	FW	Charlie Davies	25 June 1986 (aged 22)	6	1	(Swedish Football Association) Hammarby
10	MF	Benny Feilhaber	19 January 1985 (aged 23)	1	0	(The Football Association) Derby County
11	FW	Freddy Adu	2 June 1989 (aged 19)	3	4	(French Football Federation) Monaco
12	FW	Jozy Altidore	6 November 1989 (aged 18)	6	0	(Royal Spanish Football Federation) Villarreal
13	DF	Patrick Ianni	15 June 1985 (aged 23)	5	1	(United States Soccer Federation) Houston Dynamo
14	MF	Robbie Rogers	12 May 1987 (aged 21)	2	1	(United States Soccer Federation) Columbus Crew
15	DF	Michael Parkhurst*	24 January 1984 (aged 24)	0	0	(United States Soccer Federation) New England Revolution
16	MF	Sacha Kljestan	9 September 1985 (aged 22)	7	1	(United States Soccer Federation) Chivas USA
17	FW	Brian McBride* (c)	19 June 1972 (aged 36)	0	0	(United States Soccer Federation) Chicago Fire
18	GK	Brad Guzan*	9 September 1984 (aged 23)	0	0	(The Football Association) Aston Villa

* Over-aged player.

Alternates

- Dominic Cervi (goalkeeper)
- Frankie Hejduk (defender)
- Robbie Findley (forward)

Group play

Pos	Team	Pld	W	D	L	GF	GA	GD	Pts	Qualification
1	Nigeria	3	2	1	0	4	2	+2	7	Qualified for the quarterfinals
2	Netherlands	3	1	2	0	3	2	+1	5	Qualified for the quarterfinals
3	United States	3	1	1	1	4	4	0	4	
4	Japan	3	0	0	3	1	4	−3	0	

7 August 2008
17:00

Japan	0–1	United States
	Report	Holden 47'

Tianjin Olympic Center Stadium, Tianjin
Attendance: 57,102
Referee: Badara Diatta (Senegal)

10 August 2008
19:45

United States	2–2	Netherlands
Kljestan 64'; Altidore 72'	Report	Babel 16'; Sibon 90+3'

Tianjin Olympic Center Stadium, Tianjin
Attendance: 45,016
Referee: Michael Hester (New Zealand)

13 August 2008
17:00

Nigeria	2–1	United States
Isaac 39'; Obinna 79'	Report	Kljestan 88' (pen.)

Beijing Workers' Stadium, Beijing
Attendance: 48,096
Referee: Wolfgang Stark (Germany)

=== Women's tournament ===
Roster
Head coach: (Sweden) Pia Sundhage

The United States named a squad of 18 players and 4 alternates for the tournament. Prior to the tournament, Abby Wambach withdrew injured and was replaced on 17 July 2008 by Lauren Cheney, who was initially selected as an alternate player. India Trotter subsequently filled the vacant alternate spot.

No.	Pos.	Player	Date of birth (age)	Caps	Goals	Club
1	GK	Hope Solo	30 July 1981 (aged 27)	64	0	(United States Soccer Federation) University of Washington
2	DF	Heather Mitts	9 June 1978 (aged 30)	78	2	(United States Soccer Federation) University of Florida
3	DF	Christie Rampone (captain)	24 June 1975 (aged 33)	193	4	(United States Soccer Federation) Monmouth University
4	DF	Rachel Buehler	26 August 1985 (aged 22)	11	0	(United States Soccer Federation) Stanford University
5	MF	Lindsay Tarpley	22 September 1983 (aged 24)	96	26	(United States Soccer Federation) University of North Carolina
6	FW	Natasha Kai	22 May 1983 (aged 25)	48	19	(United States Soccer Federation) University of Hawaiʻi
7	MF	Shannon Boxx	29 June 1977 (aged 31)	92	18	(United States Soccer Federation) University of Notre Dame
8	FW	Amy Rodriguez	17 February 1987 (aged 21)	19	4	(United States Soccer Federation) University of Southern California
9	MF	Heather O'Reilly	2 January 1985 (aged 23)	90	19	(United States Soccer Federation) University of North Carolina
10	MF	Aly Wagner	10 August 1980 (aged 27)	121	21	(United States Soccer Federation) Santa Clara University
11	MF	Carli Lloyd	16 July 1982 (aged 26)	62	15	(United States Soccer Federation) Rutgers University
12	FW	Lauren Cheney	30 September 1987 (aged 20)	12	0	(United States Soccer Federation) University of California
13	MF	Tobin Heath	29 May 1988 (aged 20)	12	2	(United States Soccer Federation) University of North Carolina
14	DF	Stephanie Cox	3 April 1986 (aged 22)	42	0	(United States Soccer Federation) University of Portland
15	DF	Kate Markgraf	23 August 1976 (aged 31)	181	0	(United States Soccer Federation) University of Notre Dame
16	MF	Angela Hucles	5 July 1978 (aged 30)	84	7	(United States Soccer Federation) University of Virginia
17	DF	Lori Chalupny	29 January 1984 (aged 24)	70	6	(United States Soccer Federation) University of North Carolina
18	GK	Nicole Barnhart	10 October 1981 (aged 26)	9	0	(United States Soccer Federation) Stanford University

Group play

Pos	Team	Pld	W	D	L	GF	GA	GD	Pts	Qualification
1	United States	3	2	0	1	5	2	+3	6	Qualified for the quarterfinals
2	Norway	3	2	0	1	4	5	−1	6	Qualified for the quarterfinals
3	Japan	3	1	1	1	7	4	+3	4	Qualified for the quarterfinals
4	New Zealand	3	0	1	2	2	7	−5	1	

6 August 2008
19:45

Norway	2–0	United States
Larsen Kaurin 2'; Wiik 4'	Report

Qinhuangdao Olympic Sports Center Stadium, Qinhuangdao
Attendance: 17,673
Referee: Nicole Petignat (Switzerland)

9 August 2008
17:00

United States	1–0	Japan
Lloyd 27'	Report

Qinhuangdao Olympic Sports Center Stadium, Qinhuangdao
Attendance: 16,912
Referee: Pannipar Kamnueng (Thailand)

12 August 2008
19:45

United States	4–0	New Zealand
O'Reilly 1'; Rodriguez 43'; Tarpley 56'; Hucles 60'	Report

Shenyang Olympic Stadium, Shenyang
Attendance: 12,453
Referee: Dagmar Damkova (Czech Republic)

Quarterfinal

15 August 2008
18:00

United States	2–1 (a.e.t.)	Canada
Hucles 12'; Kai 101'	Report	Sinclair 30'

Shanghai Stadium, Shanghai
Attendance: 26,129
Referee: Jenny Palmqvist (Sweden)

Semifinal

18 August 2008
21:00

Japan	2–4	United States
Ohno 16'; Arakawa 90+3'	Report	Hucles 41', 80'; Chalupny 44'; O'Reilly 70'

Beijing Workers' Stadium, Beijing
Attendance: 50,937
Referee: Nicole Petignat (Switzerland)

Gold medal game

21 August 2008
21:00

(silver) Brazil	0–1 (a.e.t.)	United States (gold)
	Report	Lloyd 96'

Beijing Workers' Stadium, Beijing
Attendance: 51,612
Referee: Dagmar Damkova (Czech Republic)

== Gymnastics ==
=== Artistic ===
The United States qualified a full complement of six men and six women in artistic gymnastics. Two members of the U.S. men's gymnastics team, Paul Hamm and Jonathan Horton, were named at the conclusion of the Olympic Trials. The rest of the team was announced on Sunday, June 22. Because of the injury of his hand and shoulder, Paul Hamm withdrew from the Olympic team on July 28, 2008, and was replaced by alternate Raj Bhavsar. Additionally, Morgan Hamm withdrew from competition on August 7 because of an ankle injury, being replaced by Alexander Artemev.

Two members of the U.S. women's gymnastics team, Shawn Johnson and Nastia Liukin, were named at the end of the Olympic Trials on June 22. The remaining members were not named at the Trials, although Chellsie Memmel, Samantha Peszek and Alicia Sacramone were projected to be on the team. This left one spot vacant. The complete team was not announced until the conclusion of the women's selection camp at the Karolyi Camp near Houston, Texas, on July 17.

Men
Team

Athlete	Event	Qualification								Final							
Athlete	Event	Apparatus						Total	Rank	Apparatus						Total	Rank
Athlete	Event	F	PH	R	V	PB	HB	Total	Rank	F	PH	R	V	PB	HB	Total	Rank
Alexander Artemev	Team	14.875	15.250 Q	13.675	15.825	15.175	14.925	89.725	19 Q	—N/a	15.350	—N/a				—N/a	
Raj Bhavsar	Team	14.175	14.050	15.325	16.175	15.625	—N/a			—N/a	13.750	15.325	16.125	15.575	—N/a	—N/a	
Joe Hagerty	Team	15.275	13.925	—N/a	15.700	15.350	15.400	—N/a		14.625	—N/a				15.550	—N/a	
Jonathan Horton	Team	15.350	13.925	15.325	15.950	15.525	15.575 Q	91.650	8 Q	15.575	—N/a	15.625	16.200	15.625	15.700	—N/a	
Justin Spring	Team	14.400	—N/a	14.175	15.900	15.800	15.375	—N/a		15.200	—N/a		15.900	15.850	15.675	—N/a	
Kevin Tan	Team	—N/a	14.100	15.725	—N/a		14.425	—N/a		—N/a	12.775	15.425	—N/a			—N/a	
Total	Team	59.900	57.325	60.550	63.850	62.300	61.275	365.200	6 Q	45.400	41.875	46.375	48.225	47.050	46.925	275.850	3rd place, bronze medalist(s)

Individual finals

Athlete	Event	Apparatus						Total	Rank
Athlete	Event	F	PH	R	V	PB	HB	Total	Rank
Alexander Artemev	All-around	14.625	15.525	14.275	15.975	15.200	15.075	90.675	12
Jonathan Horton	All-around	15.600	13.675	15.575	16.100	15.275	15.350	91.575	9
Alexander Artemev	Pommel horse	—N/a	14.975	—N/a				14.975	7
Jonathan Horton	Horizontal bar	—N/a					16.175	16.175	2nd place, silver medalist(s)

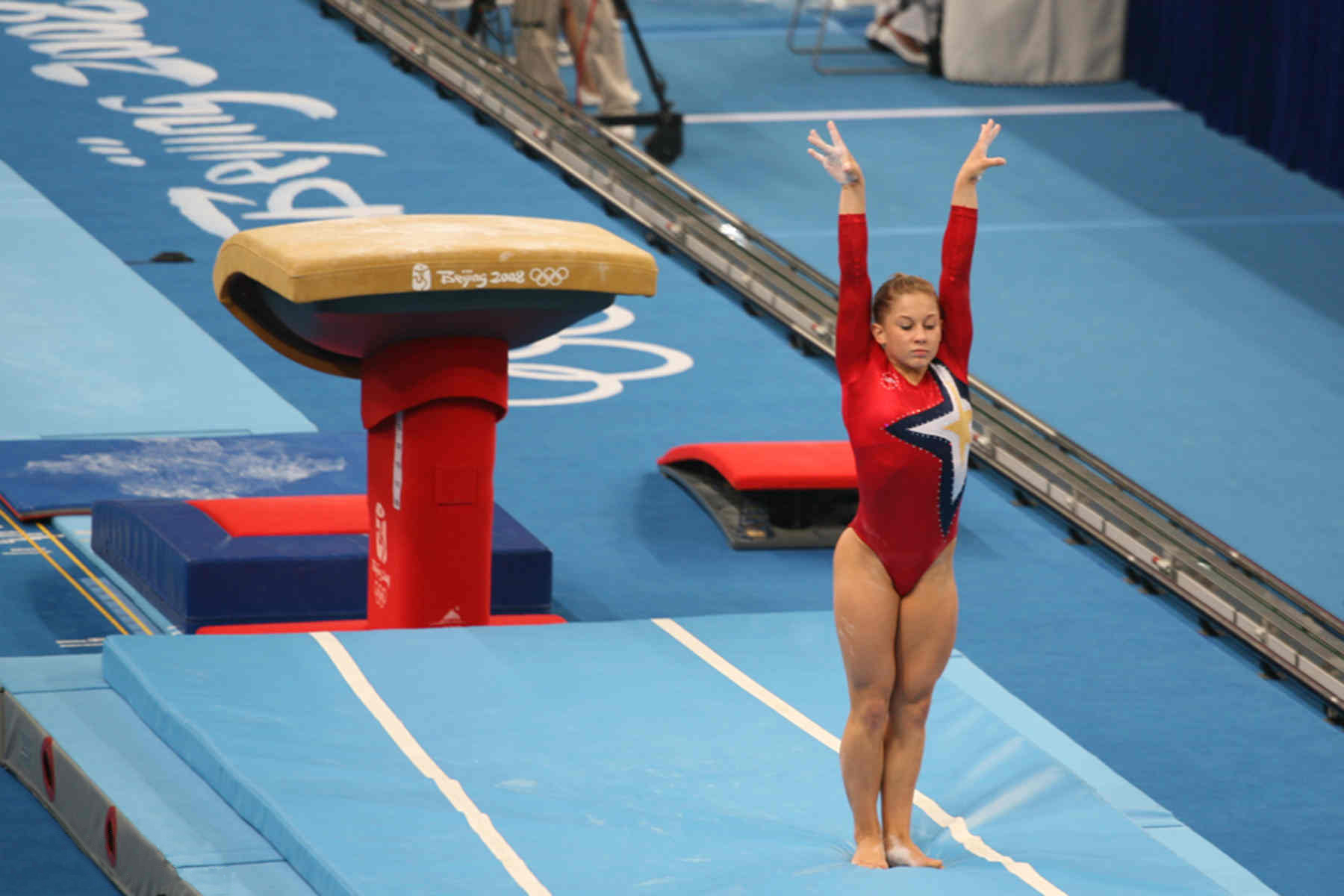
Shawn Johnson competes on vault during the team qualification.

Women
Team

Athlete	Event	Qualification						Final					
Athlete	Event	Apparatus				Total	Rank	Apparatus				Total	Rank
Athlete	Event	F	V	UB	BB	Total	Rank	F	V	UB	BB	Total	Rank
Shawn Johnson	Team	15.425 Q	16.000	15.325	15.975 Q	62.725	1 Q	15.100	16.000	15.350	16.175	—N/a	
Nastia Liukin	Team	15.350 Q	15.100	15.950 Q	15.975 Q	62.375	2 Q	15.200	—N/a	16.900	15.975	—N/a	
Chellsie Memmel^{[g]}	Team	—N/a		15.050	—N/a			—N/a		15.725	—N/a	—N/a	
Samantha Peszek^{[g]}	Team	—N/a		14.800	—N/a			Did not compete				—N/a	
Alicia Sacramone	Team	14.425	15.850 Q	—N/a	15.950	—N/a		14.125	15.675	—N/a	15.100	—N/a	
Bridget Sloan	Team	15.275	14.800	15.500	14.850	60.425	11^{[h]}	—N/a	15.200	—N/a		—N/a	
Total	Team	62.225	61.125	63.400	60.050	246.800	2 Q	46.875	47.975	47.250	44.425	186.525	2nd place, silver medalist(s)

^{g} Due to injury, Chellsie Memmel and Samantha Peszek could only compete on the uneven bars.
^{h} Only two gymnasts per country may advance to a final.

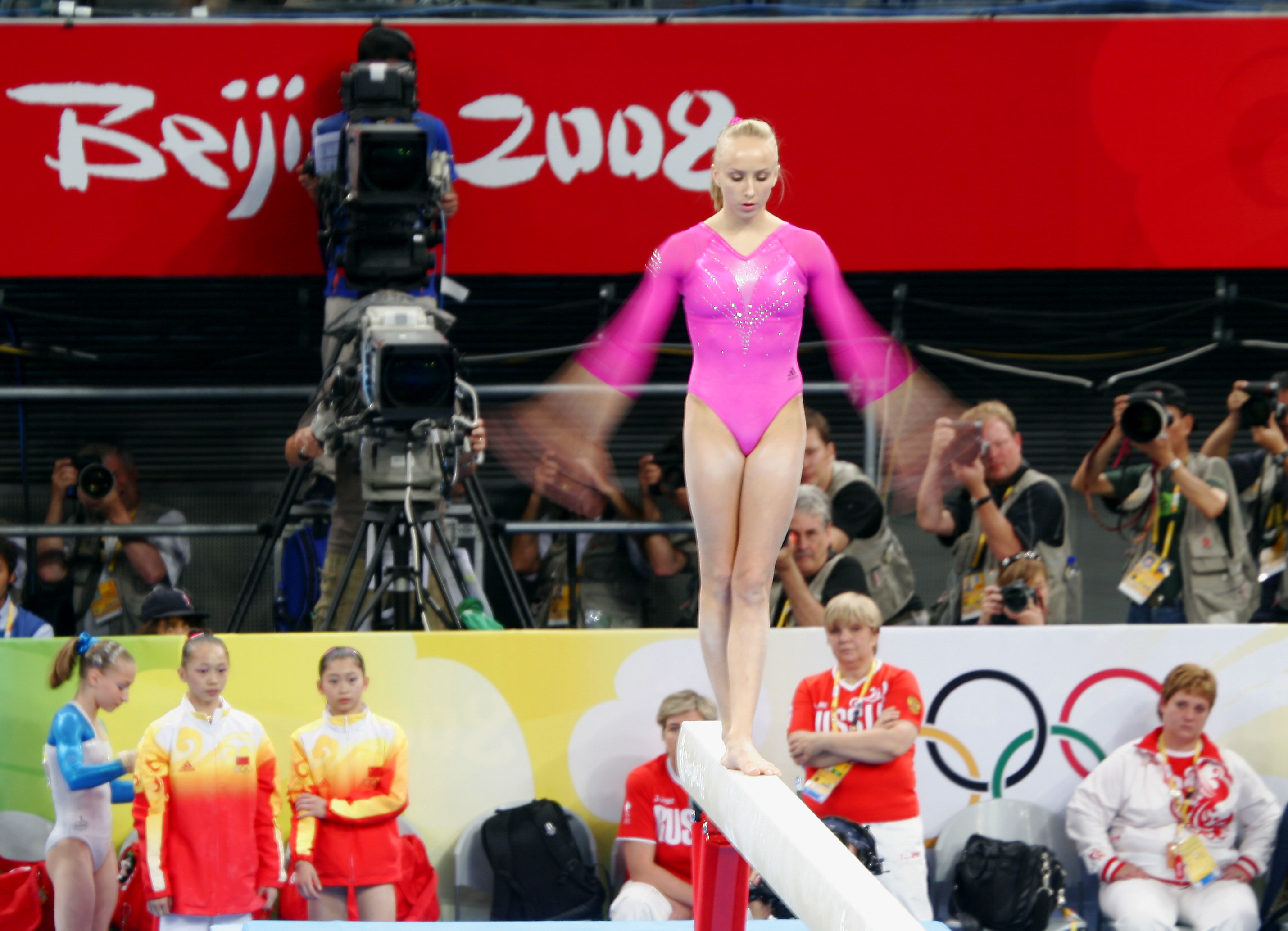
Nastia Liukin competes on the balance beam during the individual all-around final.

Individual finals

Athlete	Event	Apparatus				Total	Rank
Athlete	Event	F	V	UB	BB	Total	Rank
Shawn Johnson	All-around	15.525	15.875	15.275	16.050	62.725	2nd place, silver medalist(s)
Nastia Liukin	All-around	15.525	15.025	16.650	16.125	63.325	1st place, gold medalist(s)
Shawn Johnson	Floor	15.500	—N/a			15.500	2nd place, silver medalist(s)
Nastia Liukin	Floor	15.425	—N/a			15.425	3rd place, bronze medalist(s)
Alicia Sacramone	Vault	—N/a	15.537	—N/a		15.537	4
Nastia Liukin	Uneven bars	—N/a		16.725	—N/a	16.725	2nd place, silver medalist(s)
Shawn Johnson	Balance beam	—N/a			16.225	16.225	1st place, gold medalist(s)
Nastia Liukin	Balance beam	—N/a			16.025	16.025	2nd place, silver medalist(s)

=== Trampoline ===
Two trampolinists competed for the United States in Beijing. Chris Estrada became the first U.S. male in trampoline. Additionally, the United States had representatives in both men's and women's events for the first time. The U.S. has yet to have an athlete advance past the qualification stage.

Athlete	Event	Qualification		Final	
Athlete	Event	Score	Rank	Score	Rank
Chris Estrada	Men's	65.90	15	Did not advance	
Erin Blanchard	Women's	60.90	13	Did not advance	

== Judo ==
USA Judo announced their 2008 U.S. Olympic Team on June 18, 2008, following trials at the Thomas & Mack Center in Las Vegas, Nevada. Seven men and three women represented the United States in Judo. On August 13, 2008, Ronda Rousey became the ninth American athlete and the first American woman to win a medal in Olympic Judo.

Men

Athlete	Event	Preliminary	Round of 32	Round of 16	Quarterfinals	Semifinals	Repechage 1	Repechage 2	Repechage 3	Final / BM	
Athlete	Event	Opposition Result	Opposition Result	Opposition Result	Opposition Result	Opposition Result	Opposition Result	Opposition Result	Opposition Result	Opposition Result	Rank
Taraje Williams-Murray	−60 kg	Bye	Hiraoka (JPN); W 0001–0000	Guédez (VEN); L 0000–1000	Did not advance						
Taylor Takata	−66 kg	Bye	Zintiridis (GRE); W 0010–0000	Elmont (NED); W 0001–0000	Arencibia (CUB); L 0000–0010	Did not advance	Bye	El Hady (EGY); L 0001–1000	Did not advance		
Ryan Reser	−73 kg	—N/a	Dashdavaa (MGL); L 0100–0111	Did not advance							
Travis Stevens	−81 kg	Bye	Cisneros (ESA); W 1011–0000	Bischof (GER); L 0001–0011	Did not advance		Azizov (AZE); W 0200–0001	Camilo (BRA); L 0010–0011	Did not advance		
Brian Olson	−90 kg	—N/a	Rosati (ARG); L 0000–0001	Did not advance							
Adler Volmar	−100 kg	—N/a	Mekić (BIH); L 0000–0200	Did not advance							
Daniel McCormick	+100 kg	Bye	Bathily (SEN); W 0010–0001	Gujejiani (GEO); L 0000–1000	Did not advance		Blas Jr. (GUM); W 0100–0010	Roudaki (IRI); L 0001–1001	Did not advance		

Women

Athlete	Event	Round of 32	Round of 16	Quarterfinals	Semifinals	Repechage 1	Repechage 2	Repechage 3	Final / BM	
Athlete	Event	Opposition Result	Opposition Result	Opposition Result	Opposition Result	Opposition Result	Opposition Result	Opposition Result	Opposition Result	Rank
Sayaka Matsumoto	−48 kg	Tani (JPN); L 0000–0020	Did not advance			Wu (CHN); L 0000–1000	Did not advance			
Valerie Gotay	−57 kg	Uralbayeva (KAZ); W 1001–0100	Fernández (ESP); L 0000–0010	Did not advance						
Ronda Rousey	−70 kg	Surkieva (TKM); W 1010–0000	Piłocik (POL); W 1000–0000	Bosch (NED); L 0000–1000	Did not advance	Bye	Ouerdane (ALG); W 1001–0000	Mészáros (HUN); W 1010–0000	Böhm (GER); W 0010–0001	3rd place, bronze medalist(s)

== Modern pentathlon ==
Sheila Taormina, Margaux Isaksen and Eli Bremer were nominated to the pentathlon team after the U.S. was allocated three invitations by the Union Internationale de Pentathlon Moderne (UIPM), modern pentathlon's world governing body. On the second allocation, both Sam Sacksen and Dennis Bowsher were offered bids by the UIPM. Since one man was already on the squad, only one other slot was available. The U.S. used World Cup rankings to determine who would be on the squad and who would be named alternate. Bowsher appealed the decision but his claim was denied.

On the men's team, U.S. Olympic Training Center residents Eli Bremer and Sam Sacksen both made their Olympic modern pentathlon debuts. They struggled early, with disappointing scores in shooting (10 m air pistol) and fencing (épée one touch). For the women's team, 16-year-old Margaux Isaksen joined Sheila Taormina, the first woman to appear in the Olympics in three different sports. Like the men, Isaksen and Toarmina started off slowly, failing to rank higher than 24th in either shooting or fencing. Taormina, however, finished strongly, taking first place in riding (show jumping) and setting a modern pentathlon Olympic record in swimming (200 m freestyle). The U.S. did not medal in modern pentathlon.

Athlete	Event	Shooting (10 m air pistol)			Fencing (épée one touch)			Swimming (200 m freestyle)			Riding (show jumping)			Running (3000 m)			Total	
Athlete	Event	Points	Rank	MP Points	Results	Rank	MP points	Time	Rank	MP points	Penalties	Rank	MP points	Time	Rank	MP Points	Points	Rank
Eli Bremer	Men's	165	34	916	14–21	=29	736	2:02.80	7	1328	140	14	1060	9:19.61	7	1164	5204	23
Sam Sacksen	Men's	178	23	1072	14–21	=29	736	2:08.99	25	1256	96	7	1104	9:32.90	17	1112	5280	18
Margaux Isaksen	Women's	171	29	988	15–20	=24	760	2:20.30	20	1240	56	10	1144	10:40.41	14	1160	5292	21
Sheila Taormina	Women's	173	28	1012	4–31	36	496	2:08.86	1	1376 OR	0	1	1200	10:25.05	7	1220	5304	19

== Rowing ==
Thirteen crews represented the United States at the 2008 Olympic Games in Beijing, China.

Men

Athlete	Event	Heats		Repechage		Quarterfinals		Semifinals		Final	
Athlete	Event	Time	Rank	Time	Rank	Time	Rank	Time	Rank	Time	Rank
Ken Jurkowski	Single sculls	7:25.13	4 QF	—N/a		6:53.26	3 SA/B	7:11.52	5 FB	7:22.75	11
Cameron Winklevoss; Tyler Winklevoss	Pair	7:13.64	5 R	6:36.87	1 SA/B	—N/a		6:36.65	2 FA	7:05.58	6
Elliot Hovey; Wes Piermarini	Double sculls	6:39.37	5 R	6:26.05	4 FC	—N/a		Bye		6:33.15	13
Scott Gault; Matt Hughes; Jamie Schroeder; Sam Stitt	Quadruple sculls	5:45.77	3 SA/B	Bye		—N/a		5:52.81	2 FA	5:47.63	5
David Banks; Brett Newlin; Giuseppe Lanzone; Paul Teti	Four	6:03.96	3 SA/B	Bye		—N/a		5:57.52	5 FB	6:07.17	9
Mike Altman; Will Daly; Tom Paradiso; Patrick Todd	Lightweight four	5:56.54	4 R	6:27.43	3 SA/B	—N/a		6:16.30	6 FB	6:07.79	11
Wyatt Allen; Micah Boyd; Steven Coppola; Beau Hoopman; Josh Inman; Marcus McElhenney; Matt Schnobrich; Bryan Volpenhein; Daniel Walsh	Eight	5:29.60	2 R	5:38.95	1 FA	—N/a				5:25.34	3rd place, bronze medalist(s)

Women

Athlete	Event	Heats		Repechage		Quarterfinals		Semifinals		Final	
Athlete	Event	Time	Rank	Time	Rank	Time	Rank	Time	Rank	Time	Rank
Michelle Guérette	Single sculls	7:49.14	2 QF	—N/a		7:28.91	1 SA/B	7:35.69	2 FA	7:22.78	2nd place, silver medalist(s)
Anna Cummins; Portia McGee	Pair	7:29.95	4 R	7:32.26	3 FB	—N/a				7:33.17	7
Ellen Tomek; Megan Kalmoe	Double sculls	7:11.17	3 R	6:58.54	1 FA	—N/a				7:17.53	5
Jennifer Goldsack; Renee Hykel	Lightweight double sculls	6:53.32	3 R	7:22.22	1 SA/B	—N/a		7:12.15	4 FB	7:09.02	10
Jennifer Kaido; Lindsay Meyer; Lia Pernell; Margot Shumway	Quadruple sculls	6:19.89	3 R	6:39.53	2 FA	—N/a				6:25.86	5
Erin Cafaro; Anna Cummins; Caryn Davies; Susan Francia; Anna Goodale; Caroline Lind; Elle Logan; Lindsay Shoop; Mary Whipple	Eight	6:06.53	1 FA	Bye		—N/a				6:05.34	1st place, gold medalist(s)

Qualification Legend: FA=Final A (medal); FB=Final B (non-medal); FC=Final C (non-medal); FD=Final D (non-medal); FE=Final E (non-medal); FF=Final F (non-medal); SA/B=Semifinals A/B; SC/D=Semifinals C/D; SE/F=Semifinals E/F; QF=Quarterfinals; R=Repechage

== Sailing ==
The United States qualified in all 11 Olympic sailing classes and sent 18 athletes to the races in Qingdao, China. Laser Radial sailor Anna Tunnicliffe and Finn sailor Zach Railey became the first American sailors to win Olympic medals in their respective classes since 1992.

Men

Athlete	Event	Race											Net points	Rank
Athlete	Event	1	2	3	4	5	6	7	8	9	10	M*	Net points	Rank
Benjamin Barger	RS:X	21	22	24	26	26	~~32~~	25	18	25	31	EL	218	26
Andrew Campbell	Laser	14	18	1	26	32	~~BFD~~	8	DSQ	31	CAN	EL	174	26
Graham Biehl; Stuart McNay	470	26	12	~~OCS~~	17	15	1	4	1	6	23	EL	105	13
John Dane III; Austin Sperry	Star	8	2	4	12	15	15	~~16~~	16	10	4	EL	86	11

Women

Athlete	Event	Race											Net points	Rank
Athlete	Event	1	2	3	4	5	6	7	8	9	10	M*	Net points	Rank
Nancy Rios	RS:X	25	24	22	26	24	27	~~DNF~~	DNF	26	22	EL	224	26
Anna Tunnicliffe	Laser Radial	4	5	6	5	6	3	~~15~~	2	2	CAN	4	37	1st place, gold medalist(s)
Amanda Clark; Sara Mergenthaler	470	12	12	10	14	4	~~17~~	7	6	17	7	EL	89	12
Sally Barkow; Debbie Capozzi; Carrie Howe	Yngling	~~14~~	2	8	5	6	11	1	10	CAN	CAN	10	63	7

Open

Athlete	Event	Race																Net points	Rank
Athlete	Event	1	2	3	4	5	6	7	8	9	10	11	12	13	14	15	M*	Net points	Rank
Zach Railey	Finn	2	5	2	2	7	8	7	~~19~~	CAN	CAN	—N/a					6	45	2nd place, silver medalist(s)
Chris Rast; Tim Wadlow	49er	5	14	15	~~16~~	5	10	1	1	1	3	8	4	CAN	CAN	CAN	22	89	6
John Lovell; Charlie Ogletree	Tornado	14	12	7	11	12	14	~~15~~	15	14	15	—N/a					EL	114	15

M = Medal race; EL = Eliminated – did not advance into the medal race; CAN = Race cancelled; DNF = Did not finish; DSQ = Disqualified; OCS = On course side; BFD = Black flag disqualification

== Shooting ==
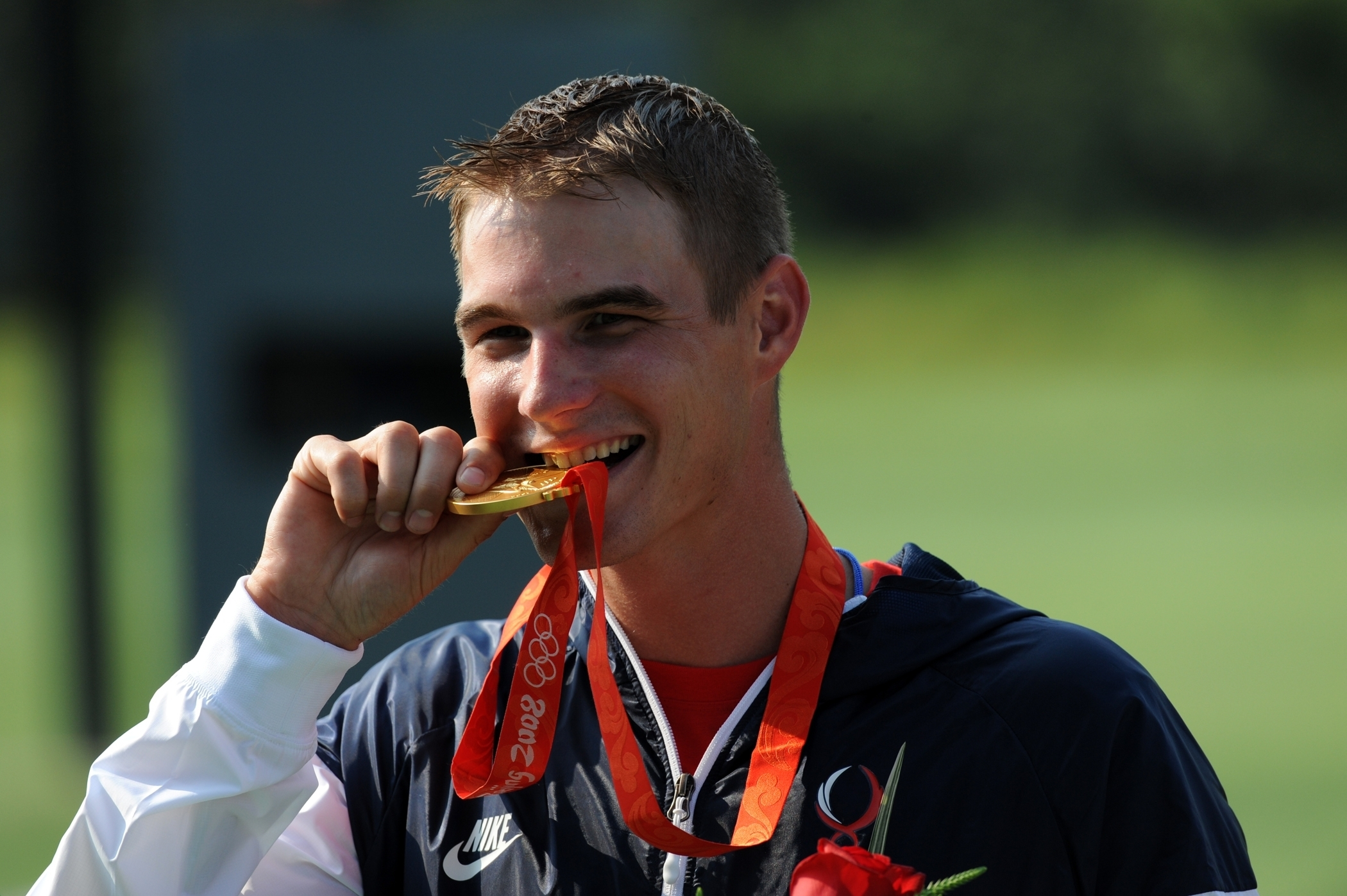
Walton "Glenn" Eller bites his Olympic gold medal after winning the men's double trap event August 12 at the Beijing Shooting Range.

Men

Athlete	Event	Qualification		Final	
Athlete	Event	Points	Rank	Points	Rank
Jason Parker	10 m air rifle	591	23	Did not advance	
Stephen Scherer	10 m air rifle	590	27	Did not advance	
Michael Anti	50 m rifle prone	594	9	Did not advance	
Matt Emmons	50 m rifle prone	597	2 Q	701.7	2nd place, silver medalist(s)
Matt Emmons	50 m rifle 3 positions	1175	2 Q	1270.3	4
Jason Parker	50 m rifle 3 positions	1164	22	Did not advance	
Brian Beaman	10 m air pistol	581	6 Q	682.0	4
Jason Turner	10 m air pistol	583	4 Q	682.0	(bronze) ^{[g]}
Keith Sanderson	25 m rapid fire pistol	583 OR	1 Q	776.6	5
Daryl Szarenski	50 m pistol	555	14	Did not advance	
Jason Turner	50 m pistol	553	21	Did not advance	
Bret Erickson	Trap	113	22	Did not advance	
Dominic Grazioli	Trap	113	23	Did not advance	
Walton Eller	Double trap	145 OR	1 Q	190 OR	1st place, gold medalist(s)
Jeff Holguin	Double trap	140	3 Q	182	4
Vincent Hancock	Skeet	121 OR	1 Q	145 OR	1st place, gold medalist(s)
Randal McLelland	Skeet	118	11	Did not advance	

^{g} - Jason Turner originally finished fourth, behind Kim Jong Su of North Korea. On August 15, 2008, the International Olympic Committee announced Kim had tested positive for the banned substance propranolol and thus stripped of his medals from the 2008 Summer Olympics. As a result, Turner was moved up to bronze in 10 m air pistol.

Women

Athlete	Event	Qualification		Final	
Athlete	Event	Points	Rank	Points	Rank
Jamie Beyerle	10 m air rifle	397	5 Q	499.8	4
Emily Caruso	10 m air rifle	395	15	Did not advance	
Jamie Beyerle	50 m rifle 3 positions	586	5 Q	686.9	5
Sandra Fong	50 m rifle 3 positions	577	21	Did not advance	
Brenda Shinn	10 m air pistol	373	37	Did not advance	
Rebecca Snyder	10 m air pistol	370	41	Did not advance	
Elizabeth Callahan	25 m pistol	575	25	Did not advance	
Rebecca Snyder	25 m pistol	575	28	Did not advance	
Corey Cogdell	Trap	69	4 Q	86	3rd place, bronze medalist(s)
Kimberly Rhode	Skeet	70	3 Q	93 OR	2nd place, silver medalist(s)

== Softball ==
The team roster for USA Softball was released on March 28, 2008. It included a fifteen-person team roster and a replacement roster of three players. The United States brought an impressive softball record to Beijing, winning every Olympic and world title since 1982. Prior to Beijing, it had a record of 106–10 in World Championships and 32–4 in the Olympics. It had won all three Olympic gold medals in softball, and outscored opponents 51–1 in Athens.

But at the Beijing Olympics, the United States lost to Japan 3–1 (after winning 7–0 in the round-robin) in the gold medal game. Japanese pitcher Yukiko Ueno had an outstanding performance after pitching 21 innings the day before. Following the surprise loss, the top three teams spelled "2016" using softballs in front of home plate in the hopes of Olympic reinstatement.

Summary

Team	Event	Group stage								Semifinal	Bronze medal game	Final	
Team	Event	Opposition Score	Opposition Score	Opposition Score	Opposition Score	Opposition Score	Opposition Score	Opposition Score	Rank	Opposition Score	Opposition Score	Opposition Score	Rank
United States women	Women's tournament	Venezuela; W 11–0	Australia; W 3–0	Canada; W 8–1	Japan; W 7–0	Chinese Taipei; W 7–0	Netherlands; W 8–0	China; W 9–0	1 Q	Japan; W 4–1	Bye	Japan; L 1–3	2nd place, silver medalist(s)

Roster

- Monica Abbott
- Laura Berg
- Crystl Bustos
- Andrea Duran
- Jennie Finch
- Tairia Flowers
- Vicky Galindo
- Lovieanne Jung
- Kelly Kretschman
- Lauren Lappin
- Caitlin Lowe
- Jessica Mendoza
- Stacey Nuveman
- Cat Osterman
- Natasha Watley

Head coach

- Mike Candrea

Assistant coaches

- Chuck D'Arcy
- Karen Jonhs
- John Rittman

Replacement roster

- Lisa Fernandez
- Alicia Hollowell
- Jenny Topping

Group stage

Qualified for the semifinals
Eliminated

The top four teams advance to the semifinal round.

All times are China Standard Time (UTC+8)

Team	W	L	RS	RA	WIN%	GB	Tiebreaker
United States	7	0	53	1	1.000	-	-
Japan	6	1	23	13	.857	1	-
Australia	5	2	30	11	.714	2	-
Canada	3	4	17	23	.429	4	-
Chinese Taipei	2	5	10	23	.286	5	2-0 vs. CHN/VEN
China	2	5	19	21	.286	5	1-1 vs. TPE/VEN
Venezuela	2	5	15	35	.286	5	0-2 vs. CHN/TPE
Netherlands	1	6	8	48	.143	6	-

Tiebreaking procedures follow the International Softball Federation's standard procedure for the resolution of ties.

Team	1	2	3	4	5	6	7	R	H	E
United States	0	4	2	5	0	X	X	11	11	0
Venezuela	0	0	0	0	0	X	X	0	0	2
WP: Jennie Finch(1-0) LP: Johana Gómez(0-1); Home runs: USA: Natasha Watley(1), Caitlin Lowe(1), Crystl Bustos(1); VEN: None

Team	1	2	3	4	5	6	7	R	H	E
Canada	1	0	0	0	0	0	0	1	1	3
United States	0	0	0	0	0	4	4	8	6	1
WP: Cat Osterman(2-0) LP: Dione Meier(0-1)

Team	1	2	3	4	5	6	7	R	H	E
United States	1	0	5	1	X	X	X	7	10	0
Chinese Taipei	0	0	0	0	0	X	X	0	2	1
WP: Jennie Finch(2-0) LP: Su-Hua Lin(0-1); Home runs: USA: Jessica Mendoza(3); TPE: None

Team	1	2	3	4	5	6	7	R	H	E
China	0	0	0	0	0	X	X	0	1	1
United States	9	0	0	0	X	X	X	9	9	0
WP: Cat Osterman(3-0) LP: Wei Lu(1-3); Home runs: CHN: None; USA: Kelly Kretschman(1)

Team	1	2	3	4	5	6	7	R	H	E
United States	0	0	0	0	1	2	X	3	5	0
Australia	0	0	0	0	0	0	0	0	0	1
WP: Cat Osterman(1-0) LP: Tanya Harding(0-1); Home runs: USA: Crystl Bustos(2); AUS: None

Team	1	2	3	4	5	6	7	R	H	E
United States	4	0	0	3	0	X	X	7	9	0
Japan	0	0	0	0	0	X	X	0	1	1
WP: Monica Abbott(1-0) LP: Naho Emoto(0-1); Home runs: USA: Natasha Watley(2), Jessica Mendoza(1,2), Crystl Bustos(3); JPN: None

Team	1	2	3	4	5	6	7	R	H	E
United States	1	2	3	2	X	X	X	8	13	0
Netherlands	0	0	0	0	0	X	X	0	0	1
WP: Monica Abbott(2-0) LP: Rebecca Soumeru(0-1); Home runs: USA: Tairia Flowers(1), Crystl Bustos(4), Jessica Mendoza(4); NED: None

Semifinal

Team	1	2	3	4	5	6	7	8	9	R	H	E
United States	0	0	0	0	0	0	0	0	4	4	6	0
Japan	0	0	0	0	0	0	0	0	1	1	3	0
WP: Monica Abbott(3-0) LP: Yukiko Ueno(3-1) Sv: Cat Osterman; Home runs: USA: Crystl Bustos(5); JPN: None

Gold medal game

Team	1	2	3	4	5	6	7	R	H	E
Japan	0	0	1	1	0	0	1	3	4	0
United States	0	0	0	1	0	0	0	1	5	2
WP: Yukiko Ueno(5-1) LP: Cat Osterman(3-1); Home runs: JPN: Eri Yamada (2); USA: Crystl Bustos (6)

Official Olympic softball schedule

== Swimming ==
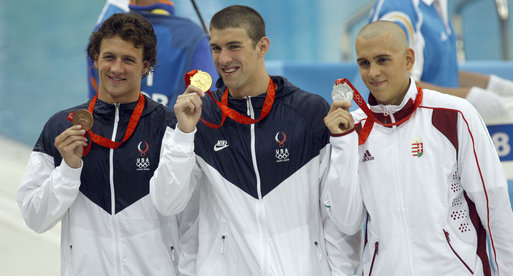
From left to right: Ryan Lochte (bronze), Michael Phelps (gold) and László Cseh (silver) show off the medals they earned from the men's 400 metre individual medley.

The United States Olympic Team Trials in Swimming were held on June 29 – July 6 in Omaha, Nebraska. The U.S. sent two people in each individual discipline and up to six people for the 4x100 freestyle relays and 4x200 freestyle relays. On August 1, Jessica Hardy, who had qualified in the 100 meter breaststroke and the 50 meter freestyle, withdrew from the Olympic team after failing an anti-doping test at the national trials. Hardy opted to pull out instead of contesting the test results at the Court of Arbitration for Sport.

The U.S. left Beijing with 31 swimming medals: 12 gold, 9 silver and 10 bronze. This surpassed the 28 medals won by the swimming team in Athens. In the process, the U.S. broke ten swimming world records and twenty-four American records. The American performance in swimming was highlighted by Michael Phelps, who won a total of eight gold medals, surpassing Mark Spitz's 36-year-old single Games record of seven gold medals. Phelps also surpassed Spitz, Larisa Latynina of the USSR, Paavo Nurmi of Finland, and American sprinter Carl Lewis to become the current record holder for the most Olympic gold medals (fourteen). All three men's relay teams set world records, and an additional six individual world records were set by Phelps, Ryan Lochte and Aaron Peirsol.

The United States also saw milestones in women's swimming. Natalie Coughlin won six medals, more than any other female swimmer in Beijing., and the most for any American female athlete in a single Olympics. Rebecca Soni set a world record in the 200 meter breaststroke. Dara Torres, who won 3 silver medals after her eight-year absence, became the oldest Olympic swimmer to win a medal, at age 41.

- Qualifiers for the latter rounds of swimming events were decided on a time only basis, therefore positions shown are overall results versus competitors in all heats.

Men

Athlete	Event	Heat		Semifinal		Final	
Athlete	Event	Time	Rank	Time	Rank	Time	Rank
Garrett Weber-Gale	50 m freestyle	21.95	9 Q	22.08	13	Did not advance	
Ben Wildman-Tobriner	50 m freestyle	21.75	3 Q	21.76	7 Q	21.64	5
Jason Lezak	100 m freestyle	48.33	11 Q	47.98	6 Q	47.67	3rd place, bronze medalist(s)
Garrett Weber-Gale	100 m freestyle	48.19	8 Q	48.12	10	Did not advance	
Michael Phelps	200 m freestyle	1:46.48	4 Q	1:46.28	4 Q	1:42.96 WR	1st place, gold medalist(s)
Peter Vanderkaay	200 m freestyle	1:47.39	12 Q	1:45.76	1 Q	1:45.14	3rd place, bronze medalist(s)
Larsen Jensen	400 m freestyle	3:43.10 AM	1 Q	—N/a		3:42.78 AM	3rd place, bronze medalist(s)
Peter Vanderkaay	400 m freestyle	3:44.22	6 Q	—N/a		3:43.11	4
Larsen Jensen	1500 m freestyle	14:49.53	8 Q	—N/a		14:48.16	5
Peter Vanderkaay	1500 m freestyle	14:52.11	11	—N/a		Did not advance	
Matt Grevers	100 m backstroke	53.41 OR	1 Q	52.99	2 Q	53.11	2nd place, silver medalist(s)
Aaron Peirsol	100 m backstroke	53.65	3 Q	53.56	5 Q	52.54 WR	1st place, gold medalist(s)
Ryan Lochte	200 m backstroke	1:56.29	1 Q	1:55.40	2 Q	1:53.93 WR	1st place, gold medalist(s)
Aaron Peirsol	200 m backstroke	1:56.35	2 Q	1:55.26	1 Q	1:54.33	2nd place, silver medalist(s)
Mark Gangloff	100 m breaststroke	1:00.71	16 Q	1:00.44	7 Q	1:00.24	8
Brendan Hansen	100 m breaststroke	1:00.36	10 Q	59.94	5 Q	59.57	4
Eric Shanteau	200 m breaststroke	2:10.29	7 Q	2:10.10	10	Did not advance	
Scott Spann	200 m breaststroke	2:10.61	10 Q	2:09.08	3 Q	2:09.76	6
Ian Crocker	100 m butterfly	51.95	13 Q	51.27	3 Q	51.13	4
Michael Phelps	100 m butterfly	50.87	2 Q	50.97	2 Q	50.58 OR	1st place, gold medalist(s)
Michael Phelps	200 m butterfly	1:53.70 OR	1 Q	1:53.70 =OR	1 Q	1:52.03 WR	1st place, gold medalist(s)
Gil Stovall	200 m butterfly	1:55.42	8 Q	1:55.36	9	Did not advance	
Ryan Lochte	200 m individual medley	1:58.15	1 Q	1:57.69	1 Q	1:56.53	3rd place, bronze medalist(s)
Michael Phelps	200 m individual medley	1:58.65	6 Q	1:57.70	2 Q	1:54.23 WR	1st place, gold medalist(s)
Ryan Lochte	400 m individual medley	4:10.33	4 Q	—N/a		4:08.09	3rd place, bronze medalist(s)
Michael Phelps	400 m individual medley	4:07.82 OR	1 Q	—N/a		4:03.84 WR	1st place, gold medalist(s)
Nathan Adrian^{[h]} Matt Grevers^{[h]} Cullen Jones; Jason Lezak; Michael Phelps; Garrett Weber-Gale; Ben Wildman-Tobriner^{[h]}	4 × 100 m freestyle relay	3:12.23 WR	1 Q	—N/a		3:08.24 WR	1st place, gold medalist(s)
Ricky Berens; Klete Keller^{[h]} Ryan Lochte; Michael Phelps; Peter Vanderkaay; Erik Vendt^{[h]} Dave Walters^{[h]}	4 × 200 m freestyle relay	7:04.66 OR	1 Q	—N/a		6:58.56 WR	1st place, gold medalist(s)
Ian Crocker^{[h]} Matt Grevers^{[h]} Mark Gangloff^{[h]} Brendan Hansen; Jason Lezak; Aaron Peirsol; Michael Phelps; Garrett Weber-Gale^{[h]}	4 × 100 m medley relay	3:32.75	1 Q	—N/a		3:29.34 WR	1st place, gold medalist(s)
Mark Warkentin	10 km open water	—N/a				1:52:13.00	8

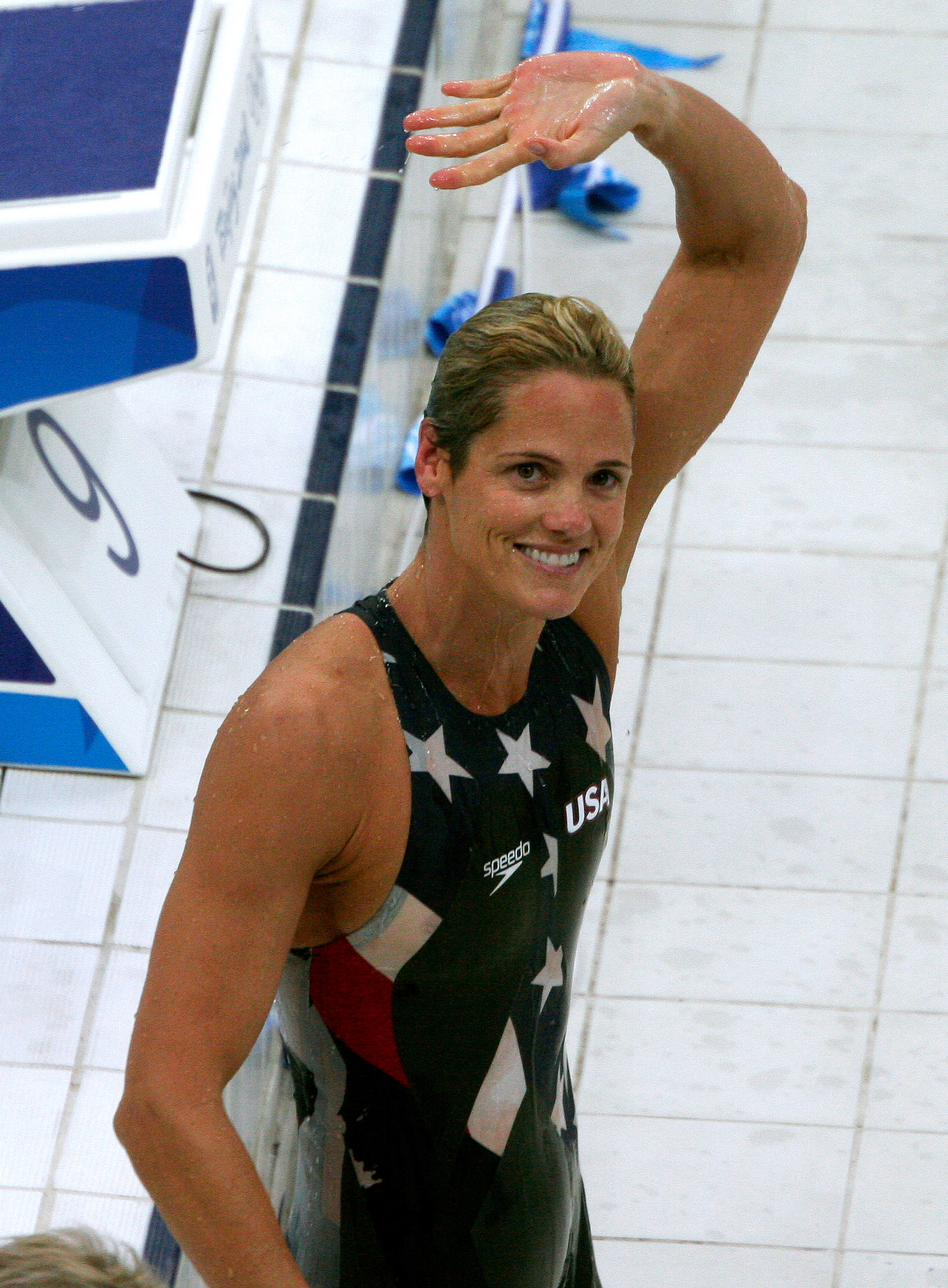
American swimmer Dara Torres waves to the crowd after taking silver in the women's 50 m freestyle event.

Women

Athlete	Event	Heat		Semifinal		Final	
Athlete	Event	Time	Rank	Time	Rank	Time	Rank
Kara Lynn Joyce	50 m freestyle	25.01	14 Q	24.63	7 Q	24.63	6
Dara Torres	50 m freestyle	24.58	3 Q	24.27	1 Q	24.07 AM	2nd place, silver medalist(s)
Natalie Coughlin	100 m freestyle	53.82	4 Q	53.70	1 Q	53.39 AM	3rd place, bronze medalist(s)
Lacey Nymeyer	100 m freestyle	54.62	14 Q	54.74	12	Did not advance	
Katie Hoff	200 m freestyle	1:57.20	4 Q	1:57.01	2 Q	1:55.78 AM	4
Allison Schmitt	200 m freestyle	1:57.38	7 Q	1:58.01	9	Did not advance	
Katie Hoff	400 m freestyle	4:03.71	3 Q	—N/a		4:03.29	2nd place, silver medalist(s)
Kate Ziegler	400 m freestyle	4:09.59	14	—N/a		Did not advance	
Katie Hoff	800 m freestyle	8:27.78	11	—N/a		Did not advance	
Kate Ziegler	800 m freestyle	8:26.98	10	—N/a		Did not advance	
Natalie Coughlin	100 m backstroke	59.69	4 Q	59.43	2 Q	58.96 AM	1st place, gold medalist(s)
Margaret Hoelzer	100 m backstroke	1:00.13	7 Q	59.84	6 Q	59.34	3rd place, bronze medalist(s)
Elizabeth Beisel	200 m backstroke	2:09.02	6 Q	2:07.90	2 Q	2:08.23	5
Margaret Hoelzer	200 m backstroke	2:09.12	7 Q	2:08.25	5 Q	2:06.23	2nd place, silver medalist(s)
Megan Jendrick	100 m breaststroke	1:08.07	9 Q	1:08.07	7 Q	1:07.62	5
Rebecca Soni	100 m breaststroke	1:07.44	4 Q	1:07.07	2 Q	1:06.73	2nd place, silver medalist(s)
Amanda Beard	200 m breaststroke	2:27.70	18	Did not advance			
Rebecca Soni	200 m breaststroke	2:22.17 OR	1 Q	2:22.64	1 Q	2:20.22 WR	1st place, gold medalist(s)
Elaine Breeden	100 m butterfly	58.06	2 Q	58.55	10	Did not advance	
Christine Magnuson	100 m butterfly	57.70	6 Q	57.08 AM	2 Q	57.10	2nd place, silver medalist(s)
Elaine Breeden	200 m butterfly	2:07.92	9 Q	2:07.73	8 Q	2:07.57	7
Kathleen Hersey	200 m butterfly	2:07.65	7 Q	2:06.96	5 Q	2:08.23	8
Natalie Coughlin	200 m individual medley	2:11.63	3 Q	2:11.84	4 Q	2:10.34	3rd place, bronze medalist(s)
Katie Hoff	200 m individual medley	2:11.58	2 Q	2:10.90	3 Q	2:10.68	4
Elizabeth Beisel	400 m individual medley	4:34.55	1 Q	—N/a		4:34.24	4
Katie Hoff	400 m individual medley	4:34.63	2 Q	—N/a		4:31.71	3rd place, bronze medalist(s)
Natalie Coughlin; Kara Lynn Joyce; Lacey Nymeyer^{[h]} Emily Silver; Julia Smit^{[h]} Dara Torres	4 × 100 m freestyle relay	3:37.53	3 Q	—N/a		3:34.33 AM	2nd place, silver medalist(s)
Caroline Burckle; Natalie Coughlin; Katie Hoff; Christine Marshall^{[h]} Allison Schmitt; Julia Smit^{[h]} Kim Vandenberg^{[h]}	4 × 200 m freestyle relay	7:52.43	2 Q	—N/a		7:46.33 AM	3rd place, bronze medalist(s)
Elaine Breeden^{[h]} Natalie Coughlin; Margaret Hoelzer^{[h]} Megan Jendrick^{[h]} Kara Lynn Joyce^{[h]} Rebecca Soni; Christine Magnuson; Dara Torres	4 × 100 m medley relay	3:59.15	3 Q	—N/a		3:53.30 AM	2nd place, silver medalist(s)
Chloe Sutton	10 km open water	—N/a				2:02:13.6	22

^{h} - Swimmer that competed in the heats only

== Synchronized swimming ==
One of the first sports in which the U.S. qualified for Beijing and formalized its Olympic roster was synchronized swimming. Berths in the duet and team events were secured at the 2007 Pan American Games. After winning both duet and team bronze medals in Athens, the U.S. failed to win a medal for the second time since synchronized swimming became an Olympic sport in 1984.

Athlete	Event	Technical routine		Free routine (preliminary)			Free routine (final)		
Athlete	Event	Points	Rank	Points	Total (technical + free)	Rank	Points	Total (technical + free)	Rank
Christina Jones; Andrea Nott	Duet	47.750	5	47.750	95.500	5 Q	47.750	95.500	5
Brooke Abel; Janet Culp; Kate Hooven^{C} Christina Jones; Becky Kim; Andrea Nott; Annabelle Orme; Jillian Penner; Kim Probst^{C}	Team	47.584	=5	—N/a			47.750	95.334	=5

^{C} - Team captain

== Table tennis ==
The United States qualified for the women's team competition, 3 places in women's singles, and 1 place in men's singles. Gao Jun and Wang Chen automatically qualified in women's singles by being in the top 20 International Table Tennis Federation (ITTF) world rankings. Yao "Crystal" Huang took the third and final North American women's spot by winning at the North American Trials in Vancouver, qualifying an American women's team in the process. David Zhuang secured the only American spot in men's singles at the North American Trials.

The entire American team was composed of Chinese-born athletes. This included Gao Jun, doubles silver medalist for China at the 1992 Olympics, who competed as an American for the third time. Although she failed to obtain a medal, Wang Chen became the first American player to advance to the quarter-finals in Olympic table tennis history after defeating 2004 Olympic bronze medalist Kim Kyung-Ah. The fifth-place performance by the women's team was also the best finish for U.S. in this sport.

Singles

Athlete	Event	Preliminary round	Round 1	Round 2	Round 3	Round 4	Quarterfinals	Semifinals	Final / BM	
Athlete	Event	Opposition Result	Opposition Result	Opposition Result	Opposition Result	Opposition Result	Opposition Result	Opposition Result	Opposition Result	Rank
David Zhuang	Men's singles	Toriola (NGR); L 3–4	Did not advance							
Gao Jun	Women's singles	Bye		Odorova (SVK); W 4–2	Hirano (JPN); W 4–1	Wu (DOM); L 3–4	Did not advance			
Crystal Huang	Women's singles	Yang (CGO); L 2–4	Did not advance							
Wang Chen	Women's singles	Bye			Tóth (HUN); W 4–1	Kim (KOR); W 4–3	Li (SIN); L 1–4	Did not advance		

Team

Athlete	Event	Group round				Semifinals	Bronze playoff		Final / BM	
Athlete	Event	Opposition Result	Opposition Result	Opposition Result	Rank	Opposition Result	Opposition Result	Opposition Result	Opposition Result	Rank
Gao Jun; Crystal Huang; Wang Chen	Women's team	Singapore; L 0–3	Netherlands; W 3–1	Nigeria; W 3–0	2	Did not advance	Romania; W 3–1	South Korea; L 0–3	Did not advance	

== Taekwondo ==
The United States sent the maximum of four athletes to compete in taekwondo; the team was announced after the final phase of the 2008 U.S. Olympic Trials for taekwondo on April 5, 2008. Diana, Mark and Steven López became the first trio from the same family to compete for the United States since 1904. All three of them won medals: one silver and two bronze. Steven López, a defending two-time Olympic gold medalist, lost his only match in six years after a controversial point deduction in the quarterfinals.

Athlete	Event	Round of 16	Quarterfinals	Semifinals	Repechage	Final / BM	
Athlete	Event	Opposition Result	Opposition Result	Opposition Result	Opposition Result	Opposition Result	Rank
Mark López	Men's −68 kg	Bahave (AFG); W 3–0	Manz (GER); W 3–1	López (PER); W 2–1	Bye	Son (KOR); L 2–3	2nd place, silver medalist(s)
Steven López	Men's −80 kg	Tanrıkulu (TUR); W 3–0	Sarmiento (ITA); L 1–2	Did not advance	Konan (CIV); W 3–0	Bronze medal bout Ahmadov (AZE); W 3–2	3rd place, bronze medalist(s)
Charlotte Craig	Women's −49 kg	Bezzola (SUI); W 4–0	Contreras (VEN); L 2–3	Did not advance			
Diana López	Women's −57 kg	Premwaew (THA); W 2–0	Tanrıkulu (TUR); L 1–2	Did not advance	Teo (MAS); W 3–0	Bronze medal bout Calabrese (ITA); W 3–2	3rd place, bronze medalist(s)

== Tennis ==
The United States Tennis Association (USTA) formally announced the American Olympic team for tennis on June 26, 2008. Because of a nagging knee injury, Lindsay Davenport withdrew from the women's singles competition on August 8, 2008, although she still played in women's doubles. In a last-minute decision, Jill Craybas was selected to participate in her first Olympics at age 34.

After losing all eight previous matches against Roger Federer, James Blake defeated him in a surprise upset in the quarterfinals of men's singles. But Federer went on to beat the top-ranked American twins Bob and Mike Bryan in the doubles semifinals. Blake finished in fourth place after losing the bronze medal match to Novak Djokovic, while the Bryan twins won a bronze medal by defeating Arnaud Clément and Michaël Llodra. Venus Williams, 2008 Wimbledon champion, and her sister Serena were both upset in the quarterfinals of women's singles. However, they went on to win the gold in doubles over Anabel Medina Garrigues and Virginia Ruano Pascual, and in improving the sisters' Olympic record to 10–0.

Men

Athlete	Event	Round of 64	Round of 32	Round of 16	Quarterfinals	Semifinals	Final / BM	
Athlete	Event	Opposition Score	Opposition Score	Opposition Score	Opposition Score	Opposition Score	Opposition Score	Rank
James Blake	Singles	Guccione (AUS); W 6–3, 7–6^{(7–3)}	Hrbatý (SVK); W 7–6^{(7–3)}, 4–6, 6–3	Simon (FRA); W 6–4, 6–2	Federer (SUI); W 6–4, 7–6^{(7–2)}	González (CHI); L 6–4, 5–7, 9–11	Djokovic (SRB); L 3–6, 6–7^{(4–7)}	4
Robby Ginepri	Singles	Djokovic (SRB); L 4–6, 4–6	Did not advance					
Sam Querrey	Singles	Andreev (RUS); L 4–6, 4–6	Did not advance					
James Blake; Sam Querrey	Doubles	—N/a	Andreev / Davydenko (RUS); L 3–6, 4–6	Did not advance				
Bob Bryan; Mike Bryan	Doubles	—N/a	Knowles / Mullings (BAH); W 6–2, 6–1	Knowle / Melzer (AUT); W 7–6^{(7–2)}, 6–4	Guccione / Hewitt (AUS); W 6–4, 6–3	Federer / Wawrinka (SUI); L 6–7^{(6–8)}, 4–6	Clément / Llodra (FRA); W 3–6, 6–3, 6–4	3rd place, bronze medalist(s)

Women

Athlete	Event	Round of 64	Round of 32	Round of 16	Quarterfinals	Semifinals	Final / BM	
Athlete	Event	Opposition Score	Opposition Score	Opposition Score	Opposition Score	Opposition Score	Opposition Score	Rank
Jill Craybas	Singles	Schnyder (SUI); L 3–6, 2–6	Did not advance					
Serena Williams	Singles	Govortsova (BLR); W 6–3, 6–1	Stosur (AUS); W 6–2, 6–0	Cornet (FRA); W 3–6, 6–3, 6–4	Dementieva (RUS); L 6–4, 4–6, 3–6	Did not advance		
Venus Williams	Singles	Bacsinzsky (SUI); W 6–3, 6–2	Benešová (CZE); W 6–1, 6–4	Azarenka (BLR); W 6–3, 6–2	Li (CHN); L 5–7, 5–7	Did not advance		
Lindsay Davenport; Liezel Huber	Doubles	—N/a	Jans / Rosolska (POL); W 6–2, 6–1	Azarenka / Poutchek (BLR); W 6–4, 4–6, 6–3	Medina Garrigues / Ruano Pascual (ESP); L 7–5, 6–7^{(6–8)}, 6–8	Did not advance		
Serena Williams; Venus Williams	Doubles	—N/a	Benešová / Vaidišová (CZE); W 4–6, 7–5, 6–1	Morita / Sugiyama (JPN); W 7–5, 6–2	Vesnina / Zvonareva (RUS); W 6–4, 6–0	A Bondarenko / K Bondarenko (UKR); W 4–6, 6–4, 6–1	Medina Garrigues / Ruano Pascual (ESP); W 6–2, 6–0	1st place, gold medalist(s)

== Triathlon ==
From September 2007 to April 2008, the U.S. held three selection events, with the top American man and woman securing a place on the U.S. Olympic team. The U.S. qualified the maximum of three women and three men in Olympic triathlon, following the Vancouver BG Triathlon World Championships in June 2008 and the world rankings released by the International Triathlon Union. Americans have medaled once since triathlon was added to the Olympic program in 2000: a bronze in Athens.

Athlete	Event	Swim (1.5 km)	Trans 1	Bike (40 km)	Trans 2	Run (10 km)	Total Time	Rank
Hunter Kemper	Men's	18:04	0:30	59:06	0:28	31:40	1:49:48.75	7
Matt Reed	Men's	18:25	0:30	58:48	0:28	34:19	1:52:30.44	32
Jarrod Shoemaker	Men's	18:19	0:29	59:03	0:28	32:27	1:50:46.39	18
Laura Bennett	Women's	19:49	0:30	1:04:23	0:29	35:10	2:00:21.54	4
Julie Ertel	Women's	19:51	0:30	1:04:24	0:32	37:22	2:02:39.22	19
Sarah Haskins	Women's	19:50	0:32	1:04:18	0:32	36:10	2:01:22.57	11

== Volleyball ==
=== Beach ===
Athlete	Event	Preliminary round				Round of 16	Quarterfinals	Semifinals	Final / BM	
Athlete	Event	Opposition Score	Opposition Score	Opposition Score	Rank	Opposition Score	Opposition Score	Opposition Score	Opposition Score	Rank
Phil Dalhausser; Todd Rogers	Men's	Pļaviņš – Samoilovs (LAT); L 0–2	Heuscher – Heyer (SUI); W 2–0	Baracetti – Conde (ARG); W 2–0	2 Q	Laciga – Schnider (SUI); W 2–1	Klemperer – Koreng (GER); W 2–0	Geor – Gia (GEO); W 2–0	Araújo – Luiz (BRA); W 2–1	1st place, gold medalist(s)
Jake Gibb; Sean Rosenthal	Men's	Boersma – Ronnes (NED); W 2–0	Brink – Dieckmann (GER); W 2–0	Asahi – Shiratori (JPN); W 2–1	1 Q	Herrera – Mesa (ESP); W 2–0	Emanuel – Ricardo (BRA); L 0–2	Did not advance		
Misty May-Treanor; Kerri Walsh	Women's	Kusuhara – Saiki (JPN); W 2–0	Fernández – Peraza (CUB); W 2–0	Håkedal – Tørlen (NOR); W 2–0	1 Q	Mouha – van Breedam (BEL); W 2–0	Larissa – Ana Paula (BRA); W 2–0	Talita – Renata (BRA); W 2–0	Tian – Wang (CHN); W 2–0	1st place, gold medalist(s)
Nicole Branagh; Elaine Youngs	Women's	Kadijk – Mooren (NED); W 2–0	Pohl – Rau (GER); W 2–0	Crespo – Esteves (CUB); W 2–1	2 Q	Fernández – Peraza (CUB); W 2–0	Xue – Zhang (CHN); L 0–2	Did not advance		

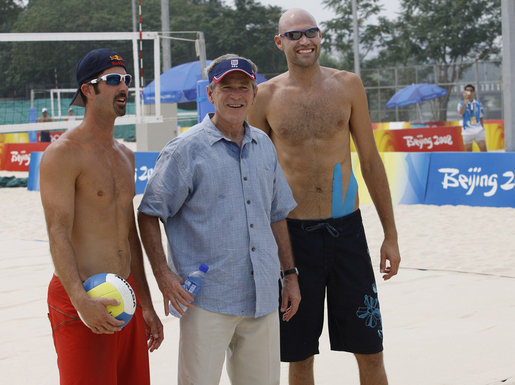
President George W. Bush poses with Todd Rogers and Phil Dalhausser during a practice session in Beijing.

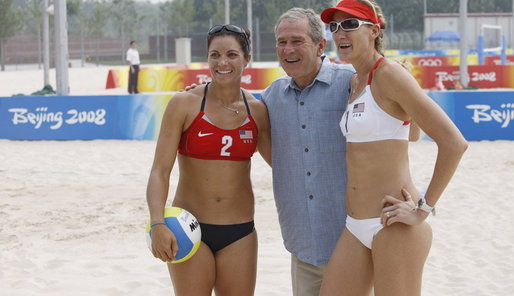
President George W. Bush poses with Misty May-Treanor and Kerri Walsh during a practice session in Beijing.

=== Indoor ===
The United States was one of nine NOCs that managed to qualify a team in both then men's and the women's tournaments. The men's team won all their matches in the tournament, and earned the gold medal. The women's team won all group matches but one, and qualified to the final round, where they continued the winning streak until losing the gold medal match, ending the tournament with the silver medal.

Summary

Team	Event	Group stage						Quarterfinal	Semifinal	Final / BM	
Team	Event	Opposition Score	Opposition Score	Opposition Score	Opposition Score	Opposition Score	Rank	Opposition Score	Opposition Score	Opposition Score	Rank
United States men	Men's tournament	Venezuela; W 3–2	Italy; W 3–1	Bulgaria; W 3–1	China; W 3–0	Japan; W 3–0	1 Q	Serbia; W 3–2	Russia; W 3–2	Brazil; W 3–1	1st place, gold medalist(s)
United States women	Women's tournament	Japan; W 3–1	Cuba; L 0–3	Venezuela; W 3–1	China; W 3–2	Poland; W 3–2	2 Q	Italy; W 3–2	Cuba; W 3–0	Brazil; L 1–3	2nd place, silver medalist(s)

==== Men's tournament ====
Roster
The following is the American roster in the men's volleyball tournament of the 2008 Summer Olympics.

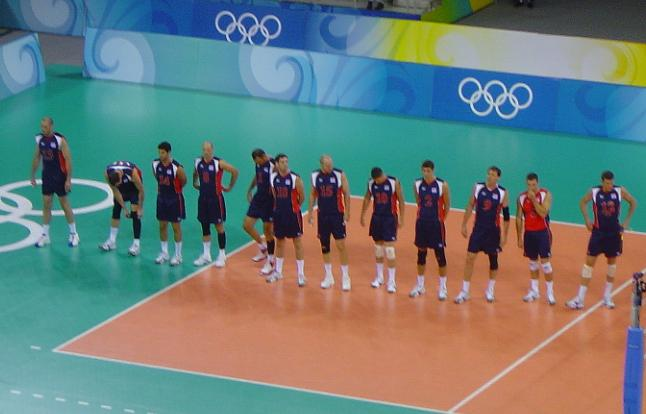
The United States team just before the group stage match against Italy. From left: Stanley, Lee, Hansen, Priddy, Ball, Touzinsky, Gardner, Salmon, Rooney, Millar, Lambourne, Hoff.

Head Coach: (New Zealand) Hugh McCutcheon

No.	Name	Date of birth	Height	Weight	Spike	Block	2008 club
1	Lloy Ball	17 February 1972	2.03 m (6 ft 8 in)	95 kg (209 lb)	351 cm (138 in)	316 cm (124 in)	(Russia) Zenit Kazan
2	Sean Rooney	13 November 1982	2.06 m (6 ft 9 in)	100 kg (220 lb)	354 cm (139 in)	336 cm (132 in)	(Russia) Dinamo-Yantar Kaliningrad
4	David Lee	8 March 1982	2.03 m (6 ft 8 in)	105 kg (231 lb)	350 cm (140 in)	325 cm (128 in)	(Turkey) Halkbank Ankara
5	Richard Lambourne (L)	6 May 1975	1.90 m (6 ft 3 in)	90 kg (200 lb)	324 cm (128 in)	312 cm (123 in)	(Poland) AZS Olsztyn
8	William Priddy	1 October 1977	1.96 m (6 ft 5 in)	89 kg (196 lb)	353 cm (139 in)	330 cm (130 in)	(Russia) Lokomotiv Novosibirsk
9	Ryan Millar	22 January 1978	2.04 m (6 ft 8 in)	98 kg (216 lb)	354 cm (139 in)	326 cm (128 in)	(Italy) Sparkling Milano
10	Riley Salmon	2 July 1976	1.97 m (6 ft 6 in)	89 kg (196 lb)	345 cm (136 in)	331 cm (130 in)	(Italy) Top Volley SRL
12	Thomas Hoff (c)	9 June 1973	1.98 m (6 ft 6 in)	94 kg (207 lb)	353 cm (139 in)	333 cm (131 in)	(Russia) Fakel New Urengoy
13	Clay Stanley	20 January 1978	2.05 m (6 ft 9 in)	104 kg (229 lb)	357 cm (141 in)	332 cm (131 in)	(Russia) Zenit Kazan
14	Kevin Hansen	19 March 1982	1.96 m (6 ft 5 in)	93 kg (205 lb)	349 cm (137 in)	330 cm (130 in)	(France) Stade Poitevin Poitiers
15	Gabriel Gardner	18 March 1976	2.09 m (6 ft 10 in)	103 kg (227 lb)	353 cm (139 in)	335 cm (132 in)	(Italy) Sparkling Milano
18	Scott Touzinsky	22 April 1982	1.98 m (6 ft 6 in)	86 kg (190 lb)	344 cm (135 in)	330 cm (130 in)	(Slovenia) ACH Volley Bled

Group play

Pos	Team	Pld	W	L	Pts	SPW	SPL	SPR	SW	SL	SR	Qualification
1	United States	5	5	0	10	460	371	1.240	15	4	3.750	Quarterfinals
2	Italy	5	4	1	9	439	401	1.095	13	6	2.167	Quarterfinals
3	Bulgaria	5	3	2	8	446	440	1.014	10	9	1.111	Quarterfinals
4	China	5	2	3	7	445	492	0.904	9	13	0.692	Quarterfinals
5	Venezuela	5	1	4	6	421	451	0.933	8	12	0.667	
6	Japan	5	0	5	5	392	448	0.875	4	15	0.267	

10 August 2008; 12:35	United States	3–2	Venezuela	Capital Indoor Stadium, Beijing; Attendance: 11,000; Referees: Konstantin Tufekchiev (BUL), Umit Sokullu (TUR)
10 August 2008; 12:35	(25–18, 25–18, 22–25, 21–25, 15–10); Results Statistics			Capital Indoor Stadium, Beijing; Attendance: 11,000; Referees: Konstantin Tufekchiev (BUL), Umit Sokullu (TUR)

12 August 2008; 12:30	United States	3–1	Italy	Capital Indoor Stadium, Beijing; Attendance: 12,500; Referees: Ibrahim Al-Naama (QAT), Kim Kun-tae (KOR)
12 August 2008; 12:30	(24–26, 25–22, 25–15, 25–21); Results Statistics			Capital Indoor Stadium, Beijing; Attendance: 12,500; Referees: Ibrahim Al-Naama (QAT), Kim Kun-tae (KOR)

14 August 2008; 22:30	Bulgaria	1–3	United States	Capital Indoor Stadium, Beijing; Attendance: 5,700; Referees: Laert Souza (BRA), Kun-Tae Kim (KOR)
14 August 2008; 22:30	(29–27, 21–25, 14–25, 24–26) result statistics			Capital Indoor Stadium, Beijing; Attendance: 5,700; Referees: Laert Souza (BRA), Kun-Tae Kim (KOR)

16 August 2008; 10:00	United States	3–0	China	Beijing Institute of Technology Gymnasium, Beijing; Attendance: 3,650; Referees: Patrick Deregnaucourt (FRA), Laert Souza (BRA)
16 August 2008; 10:00	(25–22, 25–12, 25–18) result statistics			Beijing Institute of Technology Gymnasium, Beijing; Attendance: 3,650; Referees: Patrick Deregnaucourt (FRA), Laert Souza (BRA)

18 August 2008; 22:35	Japan	0–3	United States	Capital Indoor Stadium, Beijing; Attendance: 5,800; Referees: Dejan Jovanovic (SRB), Patrick Deregnaucourt (FRA)
18 August 2008; 22:35	(18–25, 12–25, 21–25) result statistics			Capital Indoor Stadium, Beijing; Attendance: 5,800; Referees: Dejan Jovanovic (SRB), Patrick Deregnaucourt (FRA)

Quarterfinal

20 August 2008; 22:01	United States	3–2	Serbia	Capital Indoor Stadium, Beijing; Attendance: 7,500; Referees: Ning Wang (CHN), Mohammad Shahmiri (IRI)
20 August 2008; 22:01	(20–25, 25–23, 21–25, 25–18, 15–12) result statistics			Capital Indoor Stadium, Beijing; Attendance: 7,500; Referees: Ning Wang (CHN), Mohammad Shahmiri (IRI)

Semifinal

22 August 2008; 12:35	United States	3–2	Russia	Capital Indoor Stadium, Beijing; Attendance: 12,500; Referees: Osamu Sakaide (JPN), Ibrahim Al-Naama (QAT)
22 August 2008; 12:35	(25–22, 25–21, 25–27, 22–25, 15–13) result statistics			Capital Indoor Stadium, Beijing; Attendance: 12,500; Referees: Osamu Sakaide (JPN), Ibrahim Al-Naama (QAT)

Gold medal match

24 August 2008; 12:00	(gold) United States	3–1	Brazil (silver)	Capital Indoor Stadium, Beijing; Attendance: 13,000; Referees: Ning Wang (CHN), Bela Hobor (HUN)
24 August 2008; 12:00	(20–25, 25–22, 25–21, 25–23) result statistics			Capital Indoor Stadium, Beijing; Attendance: 13,000; Referees: Ning Wang (CHN), Bela Hobor (HUN)

==== Women's tournament ====
Roster
The following is the American roster in the women's volleyball tournament of the 2008 Summer Olympics.

Head Coach: (China) Lang Ping

№	Name	Date of birth	Height	Weight	Spike	Block	2008 club
1	Ogonna Nnamani	29 July 1983	1.83 m (6 ft 0 in)	80 kg (180 lb)	315 cm (124 in)	305 cm (120 in)	(Italy) Asystel Novara
2	Danielle Scott-Arruda	1 October 1972	1.88 m (6 ft 2 in)	84 kg (185 lb)	325 cm (128 in)	302 cm (119 in)	(Italy) Florens Castellana
3	Tayyiba Haneef-Park	23 March 1979	2.00 m (6 ft 7 in)	82 kg (181 lb)	328 cm (129 in)	312 cm (123 in)	(Turkey) Eczacıbaşı Zentiva
4	Lindsey Berg	16 July 1980	1.73 m (5 ft 8 in)	75 kg (165 lb)	287 cm (113 in)	274 cm (108 in)	(Italy) Asystel Novara
5	Stacy Sykora (L)	24 June 1977	1.76 m (5 ft 9 in)	61 kg (134 lb)	305 cm (120 in)	295 cm (116 in)	(Italy) Lines Ecocapitanata Altamura
6	Nicole Davis (L)	24 April 1982	1.67 m (5 ft 6 in)	73 kg (161 lb)	284 cm (112 in)	266 cm (105 in)	(Turkey) Fenerbahçe
7	Heather Bown	29 November 1978	1.88 m (6 ft 2 in)	90 kg (200 lb)	301 cm (119 in)	290 cm (110 in)	(Italy) Marche Jesi
9	Jennifer Joines	23 November 1982	1.91 m (6 ft 3 in)	82 kg (181 lb)	315 cm (124 in)	301 cm (119 in)	(Japan) Toyota Auto Body Queenseis
10	Kim Glass	18 August 1984	1.90 m (6 ft 3 in)	75 kg (165 lb)	314 cm (124 in)	299 cm (118 in)	(Turkey) Fenerbahçe
11	Robyn Ah Mow-Santos (c)	15 September 1975	1.72 m (5 ft 8 in)	67 kg (148 lb)	291 cm (115 in)	281 cm (111 in)	(Switzerland) Voléro Zürich
12	Kim Willoughby	7 November 1980	1.78 m (5 ft 10 in)	75 kg (165 lb)	315 cm (124 in)	300 cm (120 in)	(Italy) Famila Chieri
15	Logan Tom	25 May 1981	1.84 m (6 ft 0 in)	80 kg (180 lb)	315 cm (124 in)	297 cm (117 in)	(Russia) Dynamo Moscow

Group play

Pos	Team	Pld	W	L	Pts	SPW	SPL	SPR	SW	SL	SR	Qualification
1	Cuba	5	5	0	10	426	371	1.148	15	3	5.000	Quarterfinals
2	United States	5	4	1	9	459	441	1.041	12	9	1.333	Quarterfinals
3	China	5	3	2	8	467	395	1.182	13	7	1.857	Quarterfinals
4	Japan	5	2	3	7	381	389	0.979	7	11	0.636	Quarterfinals
5	Poland	5	1	4	6	441	445	0.991	9	12	0.750	
6	Venezuela	5	0	5	5	262	395	0.663	1	15	0.067	

9 August 2008; 22:00	Japan	1–3	United States	Capital Indoor Stadium; Attendance: 11,500; Referees: Massimo Menghini (Italy), Andrei Zenovich (Russia)
9 August 2008; 22:00	(20–25, 25–20, 19–25, 21–25) result statistics			Capital Indoor Stadium; Attendance: 11,500; Referees: Massimo Menghini (Italy), Andrei Zenovich (Russia)

11 August 2008; 12:35	United States	0–3	Cuba	Capital Indoor Stadium; Attendance: 12,000; Referees: Umit Sokullu (Turkey), Dejan Jovanovic (Serbia)
11 August 2008; 12:35	(15–25, 24–26, 17–25) result statistics			Capital Indoor Stadium; Attendance: 12,000; Referees: Umit Sokullu (Turkey), Dejan Jovanovic (Serbia)

13 August 2008; 12:00	Venezuela	1–3	United States	Beijing Institute of Technology Gymnasium; Attendance: 3,400; Referees: Andrei Zenovich (Russia), Dejan Jovanovic (Serbia)
13 August 2008; 12:00	(17–25, 25–20, 14–25, 18–25) result statistics			Beijing Institute of Technology Gymnasium; Attendance: 3,400; Referees: Andrei Zenovich (Russia), Dejan Jovanovic (Serbia)

15 August 2008; 20:00	United States	3–2	China	Capital Indoor Stadium; Attendance: 13,000; Referees: Konstantin Tufekchiev (Bulgaria), Umit Sokullu (Turkey)
15 August 2008; 20:00	(23–25, 25–22, 23–25, 25–20, 15–11) result statistics			Capital Indoor Stadium; Attendance: 13,000; Referees: Konstantin Tufekchiev (Bulgaria), Umit Sokullu (Turkey)

17 August 2008; 12:30	Poland	2–3	United States	Capital Indoor Stadium; Attendance: 11,000; Referees: Ibrahim al-Naama (Qatar), Francisco de Souza (Brazil)
17 August 2008; 12:30	(25–18, 21–25, 25–19, 19–25, 13–15) result statistics			Capital Indoor Stadium; Attendance: 11,000; Referees: Ibrahim al-Naama (Qatar), Francisco de Souza (Brazil)

Quarterfinal

19 August 2008; 22:00	United States	3–2	Italy	Capital Indoor Stadium; Attendance: 10,000; Referees: Francisco de Souza (Brazil), Osamu Sakaide (Japan)
19 August 2008; 22:00	(20–25, 25–21, 19–25, 25–18, 15–6) result statistics			Capital Indoor Stadium; Attendance: 10,000; Referees: Francisco de Souza (Brazil), Osamu Sakaide (Japan)

Semifinal

21 August 2008; 12:35	Cuba	0–3	United States	Capital Indoor Stadium; Attendance: 13,000; Referees: Frans Loderus (Netherlands), Dejan Jovanovic (Serbia)
21 August 2008; 12:35	(20–25, 16–25, 17–25) result statistics			Capital Indoor Stadium; Attendance: 13,000; Referees: Frans Loderus (Netherlands), Dejan Jovanovic (Serbia)

Gold medal match

23 August 2008; 20:00	(silver) United States	1–3	Brazil (gold)	Capital Indoor Stadium; Attendance: 13.000; Referees: Massimo Menghini (Italy), Umit Sokullu (Turkey)
23 August 2008; 20:00	(15–25, 25–18, 13–25, 21–25) result statistics			Capital Indoor Stadium; Attendance: 13.000; Referees: Massimo Menghini (Italy), Umit Sokullu (Turkey)

== Water polo ==
United States participated in both the men's and women's tournaments. Both teams won the silver medal.

Summary

Team	Event	Group stage						Quarterfinal	Semifinal	Final / BM	
Team	Event	Opposition Score	Opposition Score	Opposition Score	Opposition Score	Opposition Score	Rank	Opposition Score	Opposition Score	Opposition Score	Rank
United States men	Men's tournament	China; W 8–4	Italy; W 12–11	Serbia; L 2–4	Croatia; W 7–5	Germany; W 8–7	1 Q	Bye	Serbia; W 10–5	Hungary; L 10–14	2nd place, silver medalist(s)
United States women	Women's tournament	China; W 12–11	Italy; T 9–9	Russia; W 12–7	—N/a		1 Q	Bye	Australia; W 9–8	Netherlands; L 8–9	2nd place, silver medalist(s)

=== Men's tournament ===
The United States men's water polo team qualified for Beijing by winning the 2007 Pan American Games tournament, held July 21–26 in Rio de Janeiro, Brazil. The 13-man Olympic roster was set by U.S. head coach Terry Schroeder on June 30. For the first time since 1988, the American men reached the finals of the water polo tournament. They won the silver after a loss to the two-time defending gold medalists from Hungary.

Roster
The following is the American roster in the men's water polo tournament of the 2008 Summer Olympics.

№	Name	Pos.	Height	Weight	Date of birth	Club
1	Merrill Moses	GK	1.91 m (6 ft 3 in)	98 kg (216 lb)	13 August 1977	(United States) The New York Athletic Club
2	Peter Varellas	D	1.91 m (6 ft 3 in)	86 kg (190 lb)	2 October 1984	(United States) Olympic Club
3	Peter Hudnut	CB	1.96 m (6 ft 5 in)	102 kg (225 lb)	16 February 1980	(United States) Los Angeles WP Club
4	Jeff Powers	CB	2.01 m (6 ft 7 in)	109 kg (240 lb)	21 January 1980	(United States) Newport Aquatics Foundation
5	Adam Wright	D	1.91 m (6 ft 3 in)	88 kg (194 lb)	4 May 1977	(United States) The New York Athletic Club
6	Rick Merlo	D	1.91 m (6 ft 3 in)	98 kg (216 lb)	5 August 1982	(United States) The New York Athletic Club
7	Layne Beaubien	D	1.98 m (6 ft 6 in)	100 kg (220 lb)	4 July 1976	(United States) The New York Athletic Club
8	Tony Azevedo	D	1.85 m (6 ft 1 in)	91 kg (201 lb)	21 November 1981	(United States) The New York Athletic Club
9	Ryan Bailey	CF	1.98 m (6 ft 6 in)	111 kg (245 lb)	28 August 1975	(United States) Newport Aquatics Foundation
10	Tim Hutten	CB	1.96 m (6 ft 5 in)	100 kg (220 lb)	4 June 1985	(United States) Newport Aquatics Foundation
11	Jesse Smith	CB	1.93 m (6 ft 4 in)	105 kg (231 lb)	27 April 1983	(United States) Los Angeles WP Club
12	J. W. Krumpholz	CF	1.91 m (6 ft 3 in)	93 kg (205 lb)	22 November 1987	(United States) Los Angeles WP Club
13	Brandon Brooks	GK	1.98 m (6 ft 6 in)	111 kg (245 lb)	29 April 1981	(United States) Los Angeles WP Club

Head coach: Terry Schroeder

Group play

Team	Pld	W	D	L	GF	GA	GD	Pts	Qualification
United States	5	4	0	1	37	31	+6	8	Qualified for the semifinals
Croatia	5	4	0	1	56	31	+25	8	Qualified for the quarterfinals
Serbia	5	3	0	2	50	38	+12	6	Qualified for the quarterfinals
Germany	5	2	0	3	33	44	−11	4	Will play for places 7–10
Italy	5	2	0	3	57	50	+7	4	Will play for places 7–12
China	5	0	0	5	25	64	−39	0	Will play for places 7–12

All times are China Standard Time (UTC+8).

10 August 2008; 16:40	Report	United States	8–4	China	Ying Tung Natatorium, Beijing; Referees: Balfanbayev (KAZ), Brguljan (MNE)
10 August 2008; 16:40	Report	Score by quarters: 3–1, 1–2, 2–1, 2–0			Ying Tung Natatorium, Beijing; Referees: Balfanbayev (KAZ), Brguljan (MNE)
10 August 2008; 16:40	Report	Azevedo 5, Beaubien 2	Goals	Wang B. 2	Ying Tung Natatorium, Beijing; Referees: Balfanbayev (KAZ), Brguljan (MNE)

12 August 2008; 12:10	Report	Italy	11–12	United States	Ying Tung Natatorium, Beijing; Referees: Brguljan (MNE), Patelli (BRA)
12 August 2008; 12:10	Report	Score by quarters: 1–2, 2–3, 4–3, 4–4			Ying Tung Natatorium, Beijing; Referees: Brguljan (MNE), Patelli (BRA)
12 August 2008; 12:10	Report	Gallo 3, Felugo 3, Calcaterra 2, Sottani 2	Goals	Powers 3, Azevedo 2	Ying Tung Natatorium, Beijing; Referees: Brguljan (MNE), Patelli (BRA)

14 August 2008; 10:50	Report	United States	2–4	Serbia	Ying Tung Natatorium, Beijing; Referees: Antsiferov (RUS), Littlejohn (GBR)
14 August 2008; 10:50	Report	Score by quarters: 0–0, 1–2, 0–2, 1–0			Ying Tung Natatorium, Beijing; Referees: Antsiferov (RUS), Littlejohn (GBR)
14 August 2008; 10:50	Report	Varellas 2	Goals	Udovičić 1, Pijetlović 1, Šapić 1, Vujasinović 1	Ying Tung Natatorium, Beijing; Referees: Antsiferov (RUS), Littlejohn (GBR)

16 August 2008; 12:10	Report	Croatia	5–7	United States	Ying Tung Natatorium, Beijing; Referees: Simion (ROU), Antsiferov (RUS)
16 August 2008; 12:10	Report	Score by quarters: 2–2, 1–3, 0–0, 2–2			Ying Tung Natatorium, Beijing; Referees: Simion (ROU), Antsiferov (RUS)
16 August 2008; 12:10	Report	Đogaš 2	Goals	Azevedo 3	Ying Tung Natatorium, Beijing; Referees: Simion (ROU), Antsiferov (RUS)

18 August 2008; 14:00	Report	United States	8–7	Germany	Ying Tung Natatorium, Beijing; Referees: Margeta (SLO), Kiszelly (HUN)
18 August 2008; 14:00	Report	Score by quarters: 3–2, 2–1, 2–2, 1–2			Ying Tung Natatorium, Beijing; Referees: Margeta (SLO), Kiszelly (HUN)
18 August 2008; 14:00	Report	Powers 2, Wright 2	Goals	Nossek 5	Ying Tung Natatorium, Beijing; Referees: Margeta (SLO), Kiszelly (HUN)

Semifinal

22 August 2008; 19:40	Report	United States	10–5	Serbia	Ying Tung Natatorium, Beijing; Referees: Turcotte (CAN), Margeta (SLO)
22 August 2008; 19:40	Report	Score by quarters: 3–3, 2–1, 2–1, 3–0			Ying Tung Natatorium, Beijing; Referees: Turcotte (CAN), Margeta (SLO)
22 August 2008; 19:40	Report	Azevedo 3, Beaubien 2, Bailey 2	Goals	Pijetlović 2, Vujasinović 2	Ying Tung Natatorium, Beijing; Referees: Turcotte (CAN), Margeta (SLO)

Gold medal match

24 August 2008; 15:40	Report	(gold) Hungary	14–10	United States (silver)	Ying Tung Natatorium, Beijing; Referees: Turcotte (CAN), Brguljan (MNE)
24 August 2008; 15:40	Report	Score by quarters: 6–4, 3–4, 2–1, 3–1			Ying Tung Natatorium, Beijing; Referees: Turcotte (CAN), Brguljan (MNE)
24 August 2008; 15:40	Report	Dá. Varga 3, Biros 3, Dé. Varga 2	Goals	Azevedo 4, Beaubien 2, Smith 2	Ying Tung Natatorium, Beijing; Referees: Turcotte (CAN), Brguljan (MNE)

=== Women's tournament ===
The United States women's water polo team qualified for Beijing by winning the 2007 Pan American Games tournament, held July 14–20 in Rio de Janeiro, Brazil. The U.S. Olympic roster of 13 was named by head coach Guy Baker on June 30. In Beijing, the American women won their second silver medal in the last three Olympics. The U.S. also became the only nation to medal in all three Olympics featuring women's water polo.

Roster
The following is the American roster in the women's water polo tournament of the 2008 Summer Olympics.

№	Name	Pos.	Height	Weight	Date of birth	Club
1	Elizabeth Armstrong	GK	1.85 m (6 ft 1 in)	79 kg (174 lb)	31 January 1983	(United States) Great Lakes Ann Arbor
2	Heather Petri	D	1.80 m (5 ft 11 in)	75 kg (165 lb)	13 June 1978	(United States) The New York Athletic Club
3	Brittany Hayes	D	1.70 m (5 ft 7 in)	72 kg (159 lb)	7 February 1985	(United States) Socal Tustin
4	Brenda Villa	D	1.63 m (5 ft 4 in)	79 kg (174 lb)	18 April 1980	(Italy) Orizzonta Catania
5	Lauren Wenger	CF	1.91 m (6 ft 3 in)	77 kg (170 lb)	11 March 1984	(Greece) Glyfada Athens
6	Natalie Golda	CB	1.80 m (5 ft 11 in)	84 kg (185 lb)	28 December 1981	(United States) The New York Athletic Club
7	Patty Cardenas	D	1.70 m (5 ft 7 in)	73 kg (161 lb)	19 August 1984	(United States) Commerce
8	Jessica Steffens	CF	1.83 m (6 ft 0 in)	77 kg (170 lb)	7 April 1987	(United States) Sunset San Diego
9	Elsie Windes	CB	1.78 m (5 ft 10 in)	79 kg (174 lb)	17 June 1985	(United States) Tualatin Hills
10	Alison Gregorka	CB	1.78 m (5 ft 10 in)	73 kg (161 lb)	29 June 1985	(United States) Great Lakes Ann Arbor
11	Moriah van Norman	CF	1.78 m (5 ft 10 in)	95 kg (209 lb)	30 May 1984	(United States) The New York Athletic Club
12	Kami Craig	CF	1.80 m (5 ft 11 in)	91 kg (201 lb)	21 July 1987	(United States) Santa Barbara
13	Jamie Hipp	GK	1.83 m (6 ft 0 in)	73 kg (161 lb)	1 September 1981	(Spain) CN Ondaretta Alcorcón

Head coach: Guy Baker

Group play

Team	Pld	W	D	L	GF	GA	GD	Pts	Qualification
United States	3	2	1	0	33	27	+6	5	Qualified for semifinals
Italy	3	2	1	0	28	26	+2	5	Qualified for quarterfinals
China	3	1	0	2	33	33	0	2	Qualified for quarterfinals
Russia	3	0	0	3	26	34	−8	0	Will play for places 7th–8th

All times are China Standard Time (UTC+8).

11 August 2008; 17:00	Report	United States	12–11	China	Ying Tung Natatorium, Beijing; Referees: Gabor Kiszelly (HUN), Ahmet Erhan Tulga (TUR)
11 August 2008; 17:00	Report	Score by quarters: 3–3, 5–4, 2–2, 2–2			Ying Tung Natatorium, Beijing; Referees: Gabor Kiszelly (HUN), Ahmet Erhan Tulga (TUR)
11 August 2008; 17:00	Report	Golda 4, Craig 3, Hayes 2	Goals	Gao 3, Teng 2, Sun Yu. 2, Sun H. 2	Ying Tung Natatorium, Beijing; Referees: Gabor Kiszelly (HUN), Ahmet Erhan Tulga (TUR)

13 August 2008; 15:40	Report	United States	9–9	Italy	Ying Tung Natatorium, Beijing; Referees: Alan Balfanbayev (KAZ), Gabor Kiszelly (HUN)
13 August 2008; 15:40	Report	Score by quarters: 0–2, 4–2, 2–2, 3–3			Ying Tung Natatorium, Beijing; Referees: Alan Balfanbayev (KAZ), Gabor Kiszelly (HUN)
13 August 2008; 15:40	Report	Hayes 2, Villa 2	Goals	Miceli 2, di Mario 2	Ying Tung Natatorium, Beijing; Referees: Alan Balfanbayev (KAZ), Gabor Kiszelly (HUN)

15 August 2008; 14:20	Report	Russia	7–12	United States	Ying Tung Natatorium, Beijing; Referees: Jaime Moliner Molins (ESP), Ahmet Erhan Tulga (TUR)
15 August 2008; 14:20	Report	Score by quarters: 0–5, 3–2, 2–4, 2–1			Ying Tung Natatorium, Beijing; Referees: Jaime Moliner Molins (ESP), Ahmet Erhan Tulga (TUR)
15 August 2008; 14:20	Report	Konukh 2, Turova 2	Goals	Golda 3, Villa 2, Gregorka 2	Ying Tung Natatorium, Beijing; Referees: Jaime Moliner Molins (ESP), Ahmet Erhan Tulga (TUR)

Semifinal

19 August 2008; 14:20	Report	United States	9–8	Australia	Ying Tung Natatorium, Beijing; Referees: Boris Margeta (SLO), Massimiliano Caputi (ITA)
19 August 2008; 14:20	Report	Score by quarters: 2–2, 2–2, 4–1, 1–3			Ying Tung Natatorium, Beijing; Referees: Boris Margeta (SLO), Massimiliano Caputi (ITA)
19 August 2008; 14:20	Report	Villa 3 Hayes 2 Golda, Steffens, Gregorka, Craig 1	Goals	Gynther 3 R. Rippon 2 Beadsworth, Knox, M. Rippon 1	Ying Tung Natatorium, Beijing; Referees: Boris Margeta (SLO), Massimiliano Caputi (ITA)

Gold medal match

21 August 2008; 18:20	Report	(silver) United States	8–9	Netherlands (gold)	Ying Tung Natatorium, Beijing; Referees: Gabor Kiszelly (HUN), Massimiliano Caputi (ITA)
21 August 2008; 18:20	Report	Score by quarters: 2–4, 3–1, 1–2, 2–2			Ying Tung Natatorium, Beijing; Referees: Gabor Kiszelly (HUN), Massimiliano Caputi (ITA)
21 August 2008; 18:20	Report	Steffens 2 Hayes, Villa, Golda, Gregorka, van Norman, Craig 1	Goals	de Bruijn 7 van Belkum, van den Ham 1	Ying Tung Natatorium, Beijing; Referees: Gabor Kiszelly (HUN), Massimiliano Caputi (ITA)

== Weightlifting ==
The USA Weightlifting trials were held on May 25 in Atlanta, Georgia. The initial team included seven competitors and two alternates. Casey Burgener was originally selected to lift at the +105 kg event after the USOC reported that the International Weightlifting Federation offered the United States a third men's Olympic slot. The third slot never materialized, and the United States was not placed on the start list for the +105 event. The best U.S. hope for a weightlifting medal was expected to be Melanie Roach, who set a new American record and finished in sixth place.

Athlete	Event	Snatch		Clean & Jerk		Total	
Athlete	Event	Weight	Rank	Weight	Rank	Weight	Rank
Chad Vaughn	Men's −77 kg	147	16	DNF			
Kendrick Farris	Men's −85 kg	160	11	202	=7	362	8
Melanie Roach	Women's −53 kg	83	6	110	6	193	6
Carissa Gump	Women's −63 kg	88	13	116	13	204	13
Natalie Woolfolk	Women's −63 kg	97	=8	114	11	211	11
Cheryl Haworth	Women's +75 kg	115	=6	144	6	259	6

== Wrestling ==
The United States qualified in all weight classes except the 60 kg men's Greco-Roman. A total of sixteen wrestlers represented the U.S. in Beijing, winning three medals: two bronze and one gold. Henry Cejudo became the youngest wrestler ever to win Olympic gold, aged 21. His record was broken by Kyle Snyder in 2016.

Daniel Cormier had to withdraw after health issues, forfeiting his weight class.

Key:

- VT - Victory by Fall.
- PP - Decision by Points - the loser with technical points.
- PO - Decision by Points - the loser without technical points.

Men

Athlete	Event	Qualification	Round of 16	Quarterfinal	Semifinal	Repechage 1	Repechage 2	Final / BM	
Athlete	Event	Opposition Result	Opposition Result	Opposition Result	Opposition Result	Opposition Result	Opposition Result	Opposition Result	Rank
Henry Cejudo	Freestyle 55 kg	Bye	Velikov (BUL); W 3–1 ^{PP}	Gochashvili (GEO); W 3–1 ^{PP}	Sevdimov (AZE); W 3–1 ^{PP}	Bye		Matsunaga (JPN); W 3–1 ^{PP}	1st place, gold medalist(s)
Mike Zadick	Freestyle 60 kg	Bye	Fedoryshyn (UKR); L 0–3 ^{PO}	Did not advance		Bazarguruev (KGZ); L 0–3 ^{PO}	Did not advance		19
Doug Schwab	Freestyle 66 kg	Stadnik (UKR); L 0–3 ^{PO}	Did not advance						14
Ben Askren	Freestyle 74 kg	Veréb (HUN); W 5–0 ^{VT}	Fundora (CUB); L 1–3 ^{PP}	Did not advance					7
Andy Hrovat	Freestyle 84 kg	Bye	Salas (CUB); L 1–3 ^{PP}	Did not advance					12
Daniel Cormier	Freestyle 96 kg	Batista (CUB); L 0–5 ^{VB}	Did not advance						19
Steve Mocco	Freestyle 120 kg	Tomar (IND); W 3–0 ^{PO}	Liang (CHN); W 3–0 ^{PO}	Akhmedov (RUS); L 1–3 ^{PP}	Did not advance	Bye	Masoumi (IRI); L 1–3 ^{PP}	Did not advance	7
Spenser Mango	Greco-Roman 55 kg	Bye	Munteanu (ROU); W 3–1 ^{PP}	Park (KOR); L 1–3 ^{PP}	Did not advance				8
Jake Deitchler	Greco-Roman 66 kg	Bye	Begaliev (KGZ); L 1–3 ^{PP}	Did not advance		Bye	Vardanyan (UKR); L 1–3 ^{PP}	Did not advance	12
T. C. Dantzler	Greco-Roman 74 kg	Bácsi (HUN); L 1–3 ^{PP}	Did not advance						16
Brad Vering	Greco-Roman 84 kg	Michalkiewicz (POL); W 3–1 ^{PP}	Forov (ARM); L 1–3 ^{PP}	Did not advance					12
Adam Wheeler	Greco-Roman 96 kg	Bye	Virág (HUN); W 3–1 ^{PP}	Jiang (CHN); W 3–1 ^{PP}	Englich (GER); L 1–3 ^{PP}	Bye		Han (KOR); W 3–1 ^{PP}	3rd place, bronze medalist(s)
Dremiel Byers	Greco-Roman 120 kg	Chernetskyi (UKR); W 3–1 ^{PP}	Liu (CHN); W 3–1 ^{PP}	Sjöberg (SWE); L 1–3 ^{PP}	Did not advance				7

Women

Athlete	Event	Qualification	Round of 16	Quarterfinal	Semifinal	Repechage 1	Repechage 2	Final / BM	
Athlete	Event	Opposition Result	Opposition Result	Opposition Result	Opposition Result	Opposition Result	Opposition Result	Opposition Result	Rank
Clarissa Chun	48 kg	Bye	Mattsson (SWE); W 3–1 ^{PP}	Boubryemm (FRA); W 3–1 ^{PP}	Icho (JPN); L 1–3 ^{PP}	Bye		Merleni (UKR); L 1–3 ^{PP}	5
Marcie Van Dusen	55 kg	—N/a	Synyshyn (UKR); W 3–1 ^{PP}	Rentería (COL); L 1–3 ^{PP}	Did not advance				9
Randi Miller	63 kg	Farag (EGY); W 3–0 ^{PO}	Ostapchuk (UKR); W 3–1 ^{PP}	Icho (JPN); L 0–3 ^{PO}	Did not advance	Bye	Zamula (AZE); W 3–0 ^{PO}	Dugrenier (CAN); W 3–1 ^{PP}	3rd place, bronze medalist(s)
Ali Bernard	72 kg	—N/a	Obiajunwa (NGR); W 5–0 ^{VT}	Wang (CHN); L 1–3 ^{PP}	Did not advance	Bye	Fransson (SWE); W 3–1 ^{PP}	Hamaguchi (JPN); L 1–3 ^{PP}	5

== See also ==
- United States at the 2007 Pan American Games
- United States at the 2008 Summer Paralympics
