= Fencing at the 2008 Summer Olympics – Qualification =

== Qualifying Criteria ==
An NOC may enter up to 3 athletes per weapon (épée, foil, or sabre) for the weapons in which there is a team event and up to 2 athletes per weapon for other weapons.

For each team event there will be 8 qualified teams plus a team from the Host Nation if applicable. The teams will qualify as follows:

- Fédération Internationale d'Escrime (FIE) Official Team Ranking as of March 31, 2008 (best 4 teams)
- Highest ranked team from each zone (America, Europe, Asia/Oceania, Africa) outside top 4 in FIE Team Ranking (4 teams)

For each individual event (weapons which have a team event) there will be 39 qualified athletes as follows:

- All athletes qualified for team competition (24 athletes)
- The 3 highest ranked athletes in the FIE Individual adjusted official ranking (AOR) (3 athletes)
- The 7 highest ranked athletes from FIE Individual AOR by zone (Europe 2, America 2, Asia/Oceania 2, Africa 1) – 1 per NOC
- The 5 highest ranked athletes from zonal qualifying events (Europe 2, America 1, Asia/Oceania 1, Africa 1) – 1 per NOC

For the remaining individual events there will be 24 qualified athletes as follows:

- The first 8 from the FIE Individual Ranking
- The first 8 from the FIE Individual AOR by zone (Europe 3, America 2, Asia/Oceania 2, Africa 1) – 1 athlete per country
- The first 8 from zonal qualifying events (Europe 3, America 2, Asia/Oceania 2, Africa 1) – 1 per NOC, open only for NOCs not qualified as mentioned above

== Summary ==
Nation	Men					Women					Total
Nation	Individual			Team		Individual			Team		Total
Nation	Épée	Foil	Sabre	Épée	Sabre	Épée	Foil	Sabre	Foil	Sabre	Total
Algeria						1	1				2
Argentina		1									1
Australia						1	1				2
Austria		1									1
Belarus			3		X						3
Brazil		1	1								2
Burkina Faso			1								1
Canada	1	1	1			1	1	3		X	8
Chile	1										1
China	3	2	3	X	X	2	3	3	X	X	16
Cuba							1	1			2
Egypt	1	1	3		X	1	3		X		9
Estonia	1										1
France	3	2	3	X	X	2	1	3		X	14
Germany		2	1			2	3	1	X		9
Great Britain		1	1				1				3
Hong Kong		1				1		1			3
Hungary	3		3	X	X	2	3	1	X		12
Ireland								1			1
Israel		1				1	1				3
Italy	3	2	3	X	X		3	2	X		13
Japan	1	2	1			1	1	1			7
Kyrgyzstan	1										1
Mexico								1			1
Morocco	1	1									2
Netherlands	1						1				2
Norway	1										1
Panama						1					1
Peru							1				1
Poland	3	1	1	X			3	3	X	X	11
Portugal	1						1				2
Qatar		1									1
Romania		1	2			1	1				5
Russia	1		3		X	2	3	3	X	X	12
Senegal			2					1			3
South Africa	3			X				3		X	6
South Korea	3	1	1	X		1	2	2			10
Spain	1	1	2					1			5
Sweden						1					1
Switzerland	1					1					2
Thailand		1	1								2
Tunisia							1	1			2
Ukraine	3			X		1	1	3		X	8
United States	1	1	3		X	1	3	3	X	X	12
Venezuela	3		1	X		1	1	1			7
Total: 45 NOCs	41	26	40	9	8	25	41	39	8	8	212

== Men ==
=== Épée ===
Team Competition:

The first four teams in the FIE team ranking:

- France, Hungary, Italy, Poland

The highest-ranked team from each zone:

- Africa: South Africa
- Asia-Oceania: South Korea
- America: Venezuela
- Europe: Ukraine

Invitational:

- Host: China ^

^ China received two additional places for team event.

Individual Competition	Date	Venue	Vacancies	Qualified
Team world ranking	March 31, 2008	–	26	All athletes qualified for team event
Individual world ranking	March 31, 2008	–	3	(Spain) José Luis Abajo (Netherlands) Bas Verwijlen (Portugal) Joaquim Videira
Individual world ranking (Africa)	March 31, 2008	–	1	(Egypt) Ahmed Nabil
Individual world ranking (Asia-Oceania)	March 31, 2008	–	2	(China) Wang Lei (Japan) Shogo Nishida
Individual world ranking (America)	March 31, 2008	–	2	(United States) Weston Kelsey (Canada) Igor Tikhomirov
Individual world ranking (Europe)	March 31, 2008	–	2	(Switzerland) Michael Kauter (Russia) Anton Avdeev
African qualifying event	April 25, 2008	(Morocco) Casablanca	1	(Morocco) Aissam Rami
Asian-Oceania qualifying event	April 22–23, 2008	(Thailand) Bangkok	1	(Kyrgyzstan) Serguei Katchiourine
American qualifying event	April 26–27, 2008	(Mexico) Querétaro	1	(Chile) Paris Inostroza
European qualifying event	April 26, 2008	(Czech Republic) Prague	2	(Estonia) Nikolai Novosjolov (Norway) Sturla Torkildsen
TOTAL			41	

=== Foil ===
Individual Competition	Date	Venue	Vacancies	Qualified
Individual world ranking	March 31, 2008	–	8	(Germany) Peter Joppich (Italy) Salvatore Sanzo (Italy) Andrea Cassarà (France) Erwann Le Péchoux (Germany) Benjamin Kleibrink (Japan) Yuki Ota (China) Lei Sheng (China) Zhu Jun
Individual world ranking (Africa)	March 31, 2008	–	1	(Egypt) Mostafa Nagaty
Individual world ranking (Asia-Oceania)	March 31, 2008	–	2	(South Korea) Choi Byung-chul (Japan) Kenta Chida
Individual world ranking (America)	March 31, 2008	–	2	(United States) Gerek Meinhardt (Canada) Josh McGuire
Individual world ranking (Europe)	March 31, 2008	–	3	(Israel) Tomer Or (Poland) Sławomir Mocek (France) Brice Guyart
African qualifying event	April 25, 2008	(Morocco) Casablanca	1	(Morocco) Lahoussine Ali
Asian-Oceania qualifying event	April 22–23, 2008	(Thailand) Bangkok	2	(Thailand) Nontapat Panchan (Hong Kong) Lau Kwok Kin
American qualifying event	April 26–27, 2008	(Mexico) Querétaro	2	(Brazil) João Souza (Argentina) Alberto Viaggio
European qualifying event	April 26, 2008	(Portugal) Lisbon	3	(Spain) Javier Menendez (Austria) Roland Schlosser (Romania) Virgil Sălișcan
Invitational/Host Nation*	–	–	2	(Qatar) Khalid Al-Hamadi (United Kingdom) Richard Kruse
TOTAL			26	

=== Sabre ===
Team Competition:

The first four teams in the FIE team ranking:

- France, Hungary, Belarus, Russia

The highest-ranked team from each zone:

- Africa: Egypt
- Asia-Oceania: China
- America: United States
- Europe: Italy

Individual Competition	Date	Venue	Vacancies	Qualified
Team world ranking	March 31, 2008	–	24	All athletes qualified for team event
Individual world ranking	March 31, 2008	–	3	(Germany) Nicolas Limbach (Romania) Mihai Covaliu (Spain) Jorge Pina
Individual world ranking (Africa)	March 31, 2008	–	1	(Senegal) Abdulaye Thiam
Individual world ranking (Asia-Oceania)	March 31, 2008	–	2	(South Korea) Oh Eun-Seok (Thailand) Wiradech Kothny
Individual world ranking (America)	March 31, 2008	–	2	(Venezuela) Carlos Bravo (Brazil) Renzo Pasquale Agresta
Individual world ranking (Europe)	March 31, 2008	–	2	(Spain) Jaime Martí (Romania) Rareș Dumitrescu
African qualifying event	April 25, 2008	(Morocco) Casablanca	1	(Senegal) Mamadou Keita
Asian-Oceania qualifying event	April 22–23, 2008	(Thailand) Bangkok	1	(Japan) Satoshi Ogawa
American qualifying event	April 26–27, 2008	(Mexico) Querétaro	1	(Canada) Philippe Beaudry
European qualifying event	April 26, 2008	(Turkey) Istanbul	2	(Poland) Marcin Koniusz (United Kingdom) Alex O'Connell
Invitational/Host Nation*	–	–	1	(Burkina Faso) Julien Ouedraogo
TOTAL			40	

== Women ==
=== Épée ===
Individual Competition	Date	Venue	Vacancies	Qualified
Individual world ranking	March 31, 2008	–	8	(China) Li Na (Germany) Britta Heidemann (Hungary) Emese Szász (France) Laura Flessel-Colovic (France) Hajnalka Kiraly-Picot (Russia) Tatiana Logunova (China) Zhong Weiping (Germany) Imke Duplitzer
Individual world ranking (Africa)	March 31, 2008	–	1	(Egypt) Aya El Sayed
Individual world ranking (Asia-Oceania)	March 31, 2008	–	2	(South Korea) Jung Hyo-Jung (Australia) Amber Parkinson
Individual world ranking (America)	March 31, 2008	–	2	(Canada) Sherraine Schalm (United States) Kelley Hurley
Individual world ranking (Europe)	March 31, 2008	–	3	(Hungary) Ildikó Mincza-Nébald (Romania) Ana Maria Brânză (Russia) Lyubov Shutova
African qualifying event	April 25, 2008	(Morocco) Casablanca	1	(Algeria) Hadia Bentaleb
Asian-Oceania qualifying event	April 22–23, 2008	(Thailand) Bangkok	2	(Japan) Megumi Harada (Hong Kong) Yeung Chui Ling
American qualifying event	April 26–27, 2008	(Mexico) Querétaro	2	(Panama) Jesica Jimenez Luna (Venezuela) María Martínez
European qualifying event	April 26, 2008	(Czech Republic) Prague	3	(Ukraine) Yana Shemyakina (Israel) Noam Mills (Switzerland) Sophie Lamon
Invitational/Host Nation*	–	–	1	(Sweden) Emma Samuelsson
TOTAL			25	

=== Foil ===
Team Competition:

The first four teams in the FIE team ranking:

- Russia, Poland, Hungary, Italy

The highest-ranked team from each zone:

- Africa: Egypt
- Asia-Oceania: China
- America: United States
- Europe: Germany

Individual Competition	Date	Venue	Vacancies	Qualified
Team world ranking	March 31, 2008	–	24	All athletes qualified for team event
Individual world ranking	March 31, 2008	–	3	(South Korea) Nam Hyun-hee (Romania) Cristina Stahl (Israel) Delila Hatuel
Individual world ranking (Africa)	March 31, 2008	–	1	(Tunisia) Ines Boubakri
Individual world ranking (Asia-Oceania)	March 31, 2008	–	2	(Japan) Chieko Sugawara (South Korea) Jung Gil-ok
Individual world ranking (America)	March 31, 2008	–	2	(Venezuela) Mariana González (Canada) Jujie Luan
Individual world ranking (Europe)	March 31, 2008	–	2	(France) Corrine Maitrejean (Ukraine) Olga Leleyko
African qualifying event	April 25, 2008	(Morocco) Casablanca	1	(Algeria) Anissa Khelfaoui
Asian-Oceania qualifying event	April 22–23, 2008	(Thailand) Bangkok	1	(Australia) Joanna Halls
American qualifying event	April 26–27, 2008	(Mexico) Querétaro	1	(Cuba) Misleydis Campany
European qualifying event	April 26, 2008	(Portugal) Lisbon	2	(Portugal) Debora Nogueira (United Kingdom) Martina Emanuel
Invitational/Host Nation*	–	–	2	(Peru) Maria Luisa Doig (Netherlands) Indra Angad-Gaur
TOTAL			41	

=== Sabre ===
Team Competition:

The first four teams in the FIE team ranking:

- France, United States, Russia, Ukraine

The highest-ranked team from each zone:

- Africa: South Africa
- Asia-Oceania: China
- America: Canada
- Europe: Poland

Individual Competition	Date	Venue	Vacancies	Qualified
Team world ranking	March 31, 2008	–	24	All athletes qualified for team event
Individual world ranking	March 31, 2008	–	3	(Italy) Gioia Marzocca (South Korea) Kim Keum-hwa (Hungary) Orsolya Nagy
Individual world ranking (Africa)	March 31, 2008	–	1	(Tunisia) Azza Besbes
Individual world ranking (Asia-Oceania)	March 31, 2008	–	2	(South Korea) Lee Shin-mi (Hong Kong) Chow Tsz Ki
Individual world ranking (America)	March 31, 2008	–	2	(Venezuela) Alejandra Benítez (Mexico) Angélica Larios
Individual world ranking (Europe)	March 31, 2008	–	2	(Italy) Ilaria Bianco (Germany) Alexandra Bujdoso
African qualifying event	April 25, 2008	(Morocco) Casablanca	1	(Senegal) Nafi Toure
Asian-Oceania qualifying event	April 22–23, 2008	(Thailand) Bangkok	1	(Japan) Madoka Hisagae
American qualifying event	April 26–27, 2008	(Mexico) Querétaro	1	(Cuba) Maylin Gonzalez Pozo
European qualifying event	April 26, 2008	(Turkey) Istanbul	2	(Spain) Araceli Navarro (Republic of Ireland) Siobhan Byrne
TOTAL			39	

* The host country was permitted to enter eight fencers, distributed between team and individual events as it saw fit: thus, it could enter teams, or have no team and select for only the individual events. Any places unused by the host country of the 2008 Olympic Games in Beijing would be reallocated by the Tripartite Commission (IOC, NOC, FIE)
