= Fencing at the 2008 Summer Olympics – Men's sabre =

Men's sabre at the Games of the XXIX Olympiad
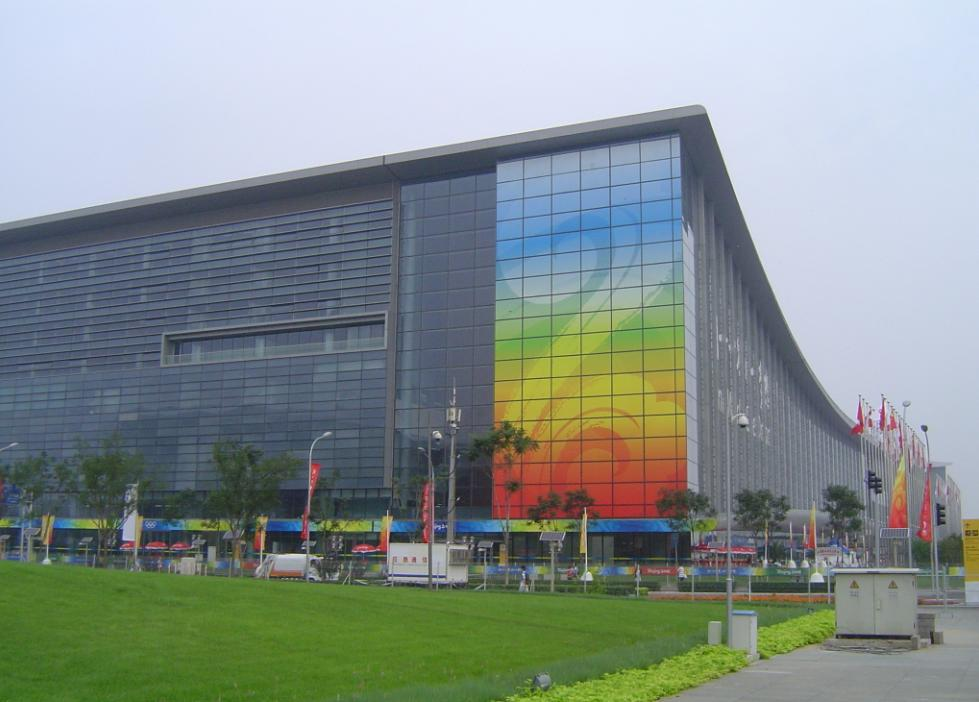
- Fencing Hall at the Olympic Green Convention Centre
- Venue: Olympic Green Convention Centre
- Date: 12 August 2008
- Competitors: 40 from 21 nations

Medalists
1st place, gold medalist(s)		Zhong Man	China
2nd place, silver medalist(s)		Nicolas Lopez	France
3rd place, bronze medalist(s)		Mihai Covaliu	Romania

The men's sabre fencing competition at the 2008 Summer Olympics in Beijing took place on August 12 at the Olympic Green Convention Centre. There were 40 competitors from 21 nations. The event was won by Zhong Man of China, the nation's first medal in the men's sabre. Nicolas Lopez's silver put France back on the podium after a one-Games absence. Mihai Covaliu of Romania became the 13th man to win multiple medals in the event, adding a bronze to his 2000 gold medal.

== Background ==
This was the 26th appearance of the event, which is the only fencing event to have been held at every Summer Olympics. Five of the quarterfinalists from 2004 returned: gold medalist Aldo Montano of Italy, silver medalist Zsolt Nemcsik of Hungary, bronze medalist Dmitry Lapkes of Belarus, sixth-place finisher (and 1996 gold medalist) Stanislav Pozdnyakov of Russia, and seventh-place finisher (and 2000 gold medalist) Mihai Covaliu of Romania. Since the last Games, Covaliu had won the 2005 world championship and Pozdnyakov had added two more world championships (2006 and 2007) to his resume (1997, 2001, and 2002 worlds along with the 1996 Olympic gold). Pozdnyakov was favored once again, though he had been upset early in both the 2000 and 2004 Games.

Burkina Faso and Senegal each made their debut in the men's sabre. Italy made its 24th appearance in the event, most of any nation, having missed the inaugural 1896 event and the 1904 Games.

== Qualification ==
Nations had been limited to three fencers each since 1928. However, the 2008 Games introduced a rotation of men's team fencing events with one weapon left off each Games; the individual event without a corresponding team event had the number of fencers per nation reduced to two. Men's foil was the first event to which this applied to, so the 2008 individual sabre competition continued to allow three fencers per nation.

There were 39 dedicated quota spots for men's sabre. The 24 fencers from the 8 teams qualified for the team event were all automatically qualified for the individual event. Next, the top 3 men in the FIE Individual Ranking received spots. After that, 7 more men were selected from the ranking based on continents: 2 from Europe, 2 from the Americas, 2 from Asia/Oceania, and 1 from Africa; each nation could only earn one spot from this continental ranking, but it could be added to any spots from the world ranking (up to three total). Finally, five spots were allocated by continental qualifying events: 2 from Europe, 1 from the Americas, 1 from Asia/Oceania, and 1 from Africa. Nations could only earn one spot from these events and only if they had no fencer qualified through rankings.

Additionally, there were 8 host/invitational spots that could be spread throughout the various fencing events. China used only 2 of those places to max out its representation in all events, so 6 spots were assigned by Tripartite Commission invitation. One was used in the men's sabre (for Julien Ouedraogo of Burkina Faso).

== Competition format ==
The sabre competition consisted of a five-round single-elimination bracket with a bronze medal match between the two semifinal losers. Fencing was done to 15 touches or to the completion of three three-minute rounds if neither fencer reached 15 touches by then. At the end of time, the higher-scoring fencer was the winner; a tie resulted in an additional one-minute sudden-death time period. This sudden-death period was further modified by the selection of a draw-winner beforehand; if neither fencer scored a touch during the minute, the predetermined draw-winner won the bout.

== Schedule ==
All times are China Standard Time (UTC+8)

Date	Time	Round
Tuesday, 12 August 2008		Round of 32; Round of 16; Quarterfinals; Semifinals; Finals

== Results ==
=== Section 1 ===
First Round
33	Renzo Agresta (BRA)	15
32	Mahmoud Samir (EGY)	10
25	Nikolay Kovalev (RUS)	15
40	Alex O'Connell (GBR)	14

Round of 32
1	Luigi Tarantino (ITA)	15
33	Renzo Agresta (BRA)	8
17	Tim Morehouse (USA)	12
16	Boris Sanson (FRA)	15
9	Zhong Man (CHN)	15
24	Wiradech Kothny (THA)	7
25	Nikolay Kovalev (RUS)	12
8	Jaime Martí (ESP)	15

Round of 16
1	Luigi Tarantino (ITA)	15
16	Boris Sanson (FRA)	7
9	Zhong Man (CHN)	15
8	Jaime Martí (ESP)	14

Quarterfinals
1	Luigi Tarantino (ITA)	13
9	Zhong Man (CHN)	15

=== Section 2 ===
First Round
37	Abdoulaye Thiam (SEN)	10
28	Jason Rogers (USA)	15
29	Mamadou Keita (SEN)	15
36	Satoshi Ogawa (JPN)	14

Round of 32
5	Keeth Smart (USA)	15
28	Jason Rogers (USA)	3
21	Áron Szilágyi (HUN)	15
12	Tamás Decsi (HUN)	9
13	Wang Jingzhi (CHN)	14
20	Julien Pillet (FRA)	15
29	Mamadou Keita (SEN)	7
4	Rareș Dumitrescu (ROU)	15

Round of 16
5	Keeth Smart (USA)	15
21	Áron Szilágyi (HUN)	10
20	Julien Pillet (FRA)	15
4	Rareș Dumitrescu (ROU)	13

Quarterfinals
5	Keeth Smart (USA)	13
20	Julien Pillet (FRA)	15

=== Section 3 ===
First Round
35	Gamal Fathy (EGY)	8
30	Philippe Beaudry (CAN)	15
27	Nicolas Lopez (FRA)	15
38	Julien Ouedraogo (BUR)	6

Round of 32
3	Aldo Montano (ITA)	15
30	Philippe Beaudry (CAN)	4
19	Diego Occhiuzzi (ITA)	9
14	Jorge Pina (ESP)	15
11	Oh Eun-seok (KOR)	15
22	Dmitri Lapkes (BLR)	8
27	Nicolas Lopez (FRA)	15
6	Stanislav Pozdnyakov (RUS)	8

Round of 16
3	Aldo Montano (ITA)	14
15	Jorge Pina (ESP)	15
11	Oh Eun-seok (KOR)	11
27	Nicolas Lopez (FRA)	15

Quarterfinals
15	Jorge Pina (ESP)	10
27	Nicolas Lopez (FRA)	15

=== Section 4 ===
First Round
39	Shadi Talaat (EGY)	7
26	Valery Pryiemka (BLR)	15
31	Carlos Bravo (VEN)	10
34	Marcin Koniusz (POL)	15

Round of 32
7	Mihai Covaliu (ROU)	15
26	Valery Pryiemka (BLR)	9
23	Zhou Hanming (CHN)	15
10	Zsolt Nemcsik (HUN)	13
15	Aleksey Yakimenko (RUS)	9
18	Aliaksandr Buikevich (BLR)	15
34	Marcin Koniusz (POL)	7
2	Nicolas Limbach (GER)	15

Round of 16
7	Mihai Covaliu (ROU)	15
23	Zhou Hanming (CHN)	12
18	Aliaksandr Buikevich (BLR)	15
2	Nicolas Limbach (GER)	14

Quarterfinals
7	Mihai Covaliu (ROU)	15
18	Aliaksandr Buikevich (BLR)	13

=== Finals ===
Semifinals
Zhong Man (CHN)	15
Julien Pillet (FRA)	12
Nicolas Lopez (FRA)	15
Mihai Covaliu (ROU)	13

Final
Zhong Man (CHN)	15
Nicolas Lopez (FRA)	9
Bronze medal match
Julien Pillet (FRA)	11
Mihai Covaliu (ROU)	15

== Final classification ==
Rank	Fencer	Nation
1st place, gold medalist(s)	Man Zhong	China
2nd place, silver medalist(s)	Nicolas Lopez	France
3rd place, bronze medalist(s)	Mihai Covaliu	Romania
4	Julien Pillet	France
5	Luigi Tarantino	Italy
6	Keeth Smart	United States
7	Jorge Pina	Spain
8	Aliaksandr Buikevich	Belarus
9	Nicolas Limbach	Germany
10	Aldo Montano	Italy
11	Rareș Dumitrescu	Romania
12	Jaime Martí	Spain
13	Eun-seok Oh	South Korea
14	Boris Sanson	France
15	Áron Szilágyi	Hungary
16	Hanming Zhou	China
17	Stanislav Pozdnyakov	Russia
18	Zsolt Nemcsik	Hungary
19	Tamás Decsi	Hungary
20	Jingzhi Wang	China
21	Aleksey Yakimenko	Russia
22	Tim Morehouse	United States
23	Diego Occhiuzzi	Italy
24	Dmitri Lapkes	Belarus
25	Wiradech Kothny	Thailand
26	Nikolay Kovalev	Russia
27	Valery Pryiemka	Belarus
28	Jason Rogers	United States
29	Mamadou Keita	Senegal
30	Philippe Beaudry	Canada
31	Marcin Koniusz	Poland
32	Renzo Agresta	Brazil
33	Carlos Bravo	Venezuela
34	Mahmoud Samir	Egypt
35	Gamal Fathy	Egypt
36	Satoshi Ogawa	Japan
37	Abdoulaye Thiam	Senegal
38	Julien Ouedraogo	Burkina Faso
39	Alex O'Connell	Great Britain
40	Shadi Talaat	Egypt
