= France at the 2008 Summer Olympics =

- IOC code: FRA
- NOC: French National Olympic and Sports Committee
- Website: www.franceolympique.com (in French)

in Beijing
- Competitors: 323 in 23 sports
- Flag bearer: Tony Estanguet
- Medals Ranked 10th: Gold 7 Silver 16 Bronze 20 Total 43

Summer Olympics appearances (overview)
- 1896; 1900; ~~1904~~; 1908; 1912; 1920; 1924; 1928; 1932; 1936; 1948; 1952; 1956; 1960; 1964; 1968; 1972; 1976; 1980; 1984; 1988; 1992; 1996; 2000; 2004; 2008; 2012; 2016; 2020; 2024; 2028

Other related appearances
- 1906 Intercalated Games

The contingent of France at the 2008 Summer Olympics comprised 323 athletes, who competed in 23 sports. They won 43 medals, including seven golds, to rank 10th on the medals table.

== Medalists ==
Medal	Name	Sport	Event
Gold	Steeve Guénot	Wrestling	Men's Greco-Roman 66 kg
Gold	Alain Bernard	Swimming	Men's 100 m freestyle
Gold	Jérôme Jeannet; Fabrice Jeannet; Ulrich Robeiri	Fencing	Men's team épée
Gold	Julien Pillet; Boris Sanson; Nicolas Lopez	Fencing	Men's team sabre
Gold	Anne-Caroline Chausson	Cycling	Women's BMX
Gold	Julien Absalon	Cycling	Men's cross-country
Gold	France national men's handball team: Jérôme Fernandez; Didier Dinart; Cédric Burdet; Guillaume Gille; Bertrand Gille; Daniel Narcisse; Olivier Girault; Daouda Karaboué; Nikola Karabatić; Christophe Kempe; Thierry Omeyer; Joël Abati; Luc Abalo; Michaël Guigou; Cédric Paty	Handball	Men's tournament
Silver	Fabrice Jeannet	Fencing	Men's individual épée
Silver	Benjamin Darbelet	Judo	Men's 66 kg
Silver	Amaury Leveaux; Fabien Gilot; Frédérick Bousquet; Alain Bernard; Grégory Mallet; Boris Steimetz	Swimming	Men's 4 × 100 m freestyle relay
Silver	Fabien Lefèvre	Canoeing	Men's slalom K-1
Silver	Nicolas Lopez	Fencing	Men's sabre
Silver	Lucie Décosse	Judo	Women's 63 kg
Silver	Vencelas Dabaya	Weightlifting	Men's 69 kg
Silver	Grégory Baugé; Kévin Sireau; Arnaud Tournant	Cycling	Men's team sprint
Silver	Amaury Leveaux	Swimming	Men's 50 m freestyle
Silver	Thomas Bouhail	Gymnastics	Men's vault
Silver	Mahiedine Mekhissi-Benabbad	Athletics	Men's 3000 m steeplechase
Silver	Julien Bontemps	Sailing	Men's RS:X
Silver	Laëtitia Le Corguillé	Cycling	Women's BMX
Silver	Jean-Christophe Péraud	Cycling	Men's cross-country
Silver	Khedafi Djelkhir	Boxing	Featherweight
Silver	Daouda Sow	Boxing	Lightweight
Bronze	Sophie Dodemont; Virginie Arnold; Bérengère Schuh	Archery	Women's team
Bronze	Hugues Duboscq	Swimming	Men's 100 m breaststroke
Bronze	Christophe Guénot	Wrestling	Men's Greco-Roman 74 kg
Bronze	Hugues Duboscq	Swimming	Men's 200 m breaststroke
Bronze	Benoît Caranobe	Gymnastics	Men's artistic individual all-around
Bronze	Stéphanie Possamaï	Judo	Women's 78 kg
Bronze	Teddy Riner	Judo	Men's +100 kg
Bronze	Alain Bernard	Swimming	Men's 50 m freestyle
Bronze	Anthony Terras	Shooting	Men's skeet
Bronze	Julien Desprès; Benjamin Rondeau; Germain Chardin; Dorian Mortelette	Rowing	Men's coxless four
Bronze	Guillaume Florent	Sailing	Finn class
Bronze	Jonathan Coeffic; Pierre-Jean Peltier; Julien Bahain; Cédric Berrest	Rowing	Men's quadruple sculls
Bronze	Nicolas Charbonnier; Olivier Bausset	Sailing	Men's 470 class
Bronze	Mickaël Bourgain	Cycling	Men's sprint
Bronze	Alexis Vastine	Boxing	Light welterweight
Bronze	Gwladys Épangue	Taekwondo	Women's 67 kg
Bronze	Marie Delattre; Anne-Laure Viard	Canoeing	Women's K-2 500 m
Bronze	Mehdi Baala	Athletics	Men's 1500 m
Bronze	Yannick Szczepaniak	Wrestling	Men's Greco-Roman 120 kg
Bronze	Manuela Montebrun	Athletics	Women's hammer throw

== Archery ==
France will send archers to the Olympics for the twelfth time. France qualified a full team of three women by placing eighth in the women's team event at the 2007 World Outdoor Target Championships. The nation had no men qualify at the world tournament, but Romain Girouelle earned the nation one spot in the men's individual competition at the European qualifying tournament.

Men

Athlete	Event	Ranking round		Round of 64	Round of 32	Round of 16	Quarterfinals	Semifinals	Final / BM	
Athlete	Event	Score	Seed	Opposition Score	Opposition Score	Opposition Score	Opposition Score	Opposition Score	Opposition Score	Rank
Romain Girouille	Individual	641	51	Kim (AUS) (14); L 110–112	Did not advance					
Jean-Charles Valladont	Individual	656	35	Naray (AUS) (30); L 106–108	Did not advance					

Women

Athlete	Event	Ranking round		Round of 64	Round of 32	Round of 16	Quarterfinals	Semifinals	Final / BM	
Athlete	Event	Score	Seed	Opposition Score	Opposition Score	Opposition Score	Opposition Score	Opposition Score	Opposition Score	Rank
Virginie Arnold	Individual	626	39	Lorig (USA) (26); L 105–107	Did not advance					
Sophie Dodemont	Individual	632	32	Hitzler (GER) (33); L 106–107	Did not advance					
Bérengère Schuh	Individual	645	14	Lionetti (ITA) (51); W 112–107	Kitabatake (JPN) (46); W 112–100	Joo H-J (KOR) (3); L 104–109	Did not advance			
Virginie Arnold; Sophie Dodemont; Bérengère Schuh	Team	1903	5	—N/a		Bye	Poland (4); W 218–211	South Korea (1); L 213–184	Great Britain (2); W 203–201	3rd place, bronze medalist(s)

== Athletics ==
The French athletics team, composed of 52 athletes, including 18 relay competitors, for 2008 Summer Olympics was announced on the July 28, 2008, following the French National Championships held in Albi. Frank Chevallier, the national technical director, believes that France has a better chance of winning two to four athletic medals.

Key

- Note–Ranks given for track events are within the athlete's heat only
- Q = Qualified for the next round
- q = Qualified for the next round as a fastest loser or, in field events, by position without achieving the qualifying target
- NR = National record
- N/A = Round not applicable for the event
- Bye = Athlete not required to compete in round

Men
Track & road events

Athlete	Event	Heat		Quarterfinal		Semifinal		Final	
Athlete	Event	Result	Rank	Result	Rank	Result	Rank	Result	Rank
Mehdi Baala	1500 m	3:35.87	1 Q	—N/a		3:37.47	2 Q	3:34.21	3rd place, bronze medalist(s)
Samuel Coco-Viloin	110 m hurdles	13.60	4 Q	13.51	4 q	13.65	8	Did not advance	
Yohann Diniz	50 km walk	—N/a						DNF	
Leslie Djhone	400 m	45.12	1 Q	—N/a		44.79 SB	1 Q	45.11	5
Ladji Doucouré	110 m hurdles	13.52	2 Q	13.39	2 Q	13.22 SB	3 Q	13.24	4
Martial Mbandjock	100 m	10.26	2 Q	10.16	3 Q	10.18	8	Did not advance	
Mahiedine Mekhissi-Benabbad	3000 m steeplechase	8:16.95 SB	2 Q	—N/a				8:10.49 PB	2nd place, silver medalist(s)
Simon Munyutu	Marathon	—N/a						2:25:50	57
Ronald Pognon	100 m	10.26	3 Q	10.21	5	Did not advance			
Eddy Riva	50 km walk	—N/a						4:00.49	28
Bouabdellah Tahri	3000 m steeplechase	8:23.42	1 Q	—N/a				8:14.79	5
Vincent Zouaoui-Dandrieux	3000 m steeplechase	8:27.91	7	—N/a				Did not advance	
David Alerte; Christophe Lemaitre; Martial Mbandjock; Issa Aimé Nthépé; Ronald Pognon; Manuel Reynaert	4 × 100 m relay	39.53	6	—N/a				Did not advance	
Leslie Djhone; Richard Maunier; Ydrissa M'Barke; Brice Panel; Teddy Venel	4 × 400 m relay	3:03.19	8	—N/a				Did not advance	

Field events

Athlete	Event	Qualification		Final	
Athlete	Event	Distance	Position	Distance	Position
Jérôme Clavier	Pole vault	5.65	3 q	5.60	7
Colomba Fofana	Triple jump	16.42	29	Did not advance	
Mickaël Hanany	High jump	2.25	=14	Did not advance	
Romain Mesnil	Pole vault	5.55	=14	Did not advance	
Yves Niaré	Shot put	19.73	23	Did not advance	
Salim Sdiri	Long jump	7.81	21	Did not advance	

Combined events – Decathlon

Athlete	Event	100 m	LJ	SP	HJ	400 m	110H	DT	PV	JT	1500 m	Final	Rank
Romain Barras	Result	11.26	7.08	15.42	1.96	49.51	14.21	45.17	5.00	65.40	4:29.29	8253 SB	4
Romain Barras	Points	804	833	816	767	837	948	770	910	819	749	8253 SB	4

Women
Track & road events

Athlete	Event	Heat		Quarterfinal		Semifinal		Final	
Athlete	Event	Result	Rank	Result	Rank	Result	Rank	Result	Rank
Christine Arron	100 m	11.37	1 Q	11.36	4	Did not advance			
Christelle Daunay	Marathon	—N/a						2:31:48	20
Sophie Duarte	3000 m steeplechase	9:38.08	7	—N/a				Did not advance	
Élodie Guégan	800 m	2:03.85	3 Q	—N/a		DNF		Did not advance	
Muriel Hurtis-Houairi	200 m	22.72	2 Q	22.89	2 Q	22.71	5	Did not advance	
Adriana Lamalle	100 m hurdles	DNS		—N/a		Did not advance			
Reïna-Flor Okori	100 m hurdles	12.98	3 q	—N/a		13.05	6	Did not advance	
Christine Arron; Muriel Hurtis-Houairi; Ayodelé Ikuesan; Lina Jacques-Sebastien; Carima Louami; Myriam Soumaré	4 × 100 m relay	DNF		—N/a				Did not advance	
Phara Anacharsis; Solen Desert; Élodie Guégan; Aurore Kassambara; Virginie Michanol; Thélia Sigere	4 × 400 m relay	3:26.61 SB	5	—N/a				Did not advance	

Field events

Athlete	Event	Qualification		Final	
Athlete	Event	Distance	Position	Distance	Position
Vanessa Boslak	Pole vault	4.50 SB	2 q	4.55 SB	9
Marion Buisson	Pole vault	4.15	23	Did not advance	
Stéphanie Falzon	Hammer throw	68.94	14	Did not advance	
Manuela Montebrun	Hammer throw	72.81	4 Q	72.54	3rd place, bronze medalist(s)
Teresa Nzola Meso	Triple Jump	14.11	14	Did not advance	
Amélie Perrin	Hammer throw	NM	—	Did not advance	
Mélina Robert-Michon	Discus throw	62.21 SB	5 Q	60.66	8
Melanie Skotnik	High Jump	1.89	16	Did not advance	

Combined events – Heptathlon

Athlete	Event	100H	HJ	SP	200 m	LJ	JT	800 m	Final	Rank
Marie Collonvillé	Result	13.57	1.86	12.42	25.06	6.21	46.14	2:11.81	6302 SB	12*
Marie Collonvillé	Points	1040	1054	689	881	915	785	938	6302 SB	12*
Antoinette Nana Djimou Ida	Result	13.85	1.71	13.12	24.90	6.16	49.32	2:20.96	6055	18*
Antoinette Nana Djimou Ida	Points	1000	867	735	896	899	847	811	6055	18*

* The athlete who finished in second place, Lyudmila Blonska of Ukraine, tested positive for a banned substance. Both the A and the B tests were positive, therefore Blonska was stripped of her silver medal, and both French heptathletes moved up a position.

== Badminton ==
France is being represented by two athletes.

Athlete	Event	Round of 64	Round of 32	Round of 16	Quarterfinal	Semifinal	Final / BM	
Athlete	Event	Opposition Score	Opposition Score	Opposition Score	Opposition Score	Opposition Score	Opposition Score	Rank
Erwin Kehlhoffner	Men's singles	Gomez (AUS); W 19–21, 22–20, 21–15	Mambwe (ZAM); W 21–15, 21–17	Chen J (CHN); L 10–21, 6–21	Did not advance			
Pi Hongyan	Women's singles	Bye	Rivero (PER); W 21–6, 21–9	Hirose (JPN); W 21–12, 16–21, 21–6	Zhang N (CHN); L 8–21, 21–19, 19–21	Did not advance		

== Boxing ==
France qualified nine boxers for the Olympic boxing tournament. Oubaali, Vastine, and M'Bumba qualified at the 2007 World Championships. Djelkhir became the fourth French qualifier at the first European qualifying tournament. Thomas, Hallab, Sow, and Chiguer joined the French Olympic team by qualifying at the 2nd continental qualifier.

Athlete	Event	Round of 32	Round of 16	Quarterfinals	Semifinals	Final	
Athlete	Event	Opposition Result	Opposition Result	Opposition Result	Opposition Result	Opposition Result	Rank
Nordine Oubaali	Light flyweight	Sultonov (UZB); W 8–7	Zou (CHN); L 3–3^{+}	Did not advance			
Jérôme Thomas	Flyweight	Payano (DOM); L 6–10	Did not advance				
Ali Hallab	Bantamweight	Kumar (IND); L 5–12	Did not advance				
Khedafi Djelkhir	Featherweight	Fleming (AUS); W 13–9	Williams (USA); W 9–7	Santos (MEX); W 14–9	Imranov (AZE); W WO	Lomachenko (UKR); L RSC	2nd place, silver medalist(s)
Daouda Sow	Lightweight	Kim S-G (PRK); W 13–3	Pedraza (PUR); W 13–9	Hu Q (CHN); W 9–6	Ugás (CUB); W 15–8	Tishchenko (RUS); L 9–11	2nd place, silver medalist(s)
Alexis Vastine	Light welterweight	Kavaliauskas (LTU); W 13–2	Saunders (GBR); W 11–7	Mönkh-Erdene (MGL); W 12–4	Díaz (DOM); L 10–12	Did not advance	3rd place, bronze medalist(s)
Jaoid Chiguer	Welterweight	Bashirov (TKM); W 17–6	Mahmudov (UZB); L 3–8	Did not advance			
Jean-Mickaël Raymond	Middleweight	Rasulov (UZB); L 2–8	Did not advance				
John M'Bumba	Heavyweight	—N/a	Bianco (COL); W 11–5	Chakhkeiv (RUS); L 9–18	Did not advance		

== Canoeing ==
=== Slalom ===
Athlete	Event	Preliminary						Semifinal		Final			
Athlete	Event	Run 1	Rank	Run 2	Rank	Total	Rank	Time	Rank	Time	Rank	Total	Rank
Tony Estanguet	Men's C-1	89.99	8	86.09	6	176.08	6 Q	93.92	9	Did not advance			
Fabien Lefèvre	Men's K-1	85.66	9	84.70	2	168.06	2 Q	87.21	3 Q	86.09	2	173.30	2nd place, silver medalist(s)
Cédric Forgit; Martin Braud	Men's C-2	96.17	4	92.39	1	188.56	2 Q	102.76	5 Q	95.43	1	198.19	4
Émilie Fer	Women's K-1	96.90	5	92.78	3	189.68	5 Q	98.50	2 Q	153.46	7	251.96	7

=== Sprint ===
Men

Athlete	Event	Heats		Semifinals		Final	
Athlete	Event	Time	Rank	Time	Rank	Time	Rank
Mathieu Goubel	C-1 500 m	1:49.527	3 QS	1:52.239	2 Q	1:49.056	4
Mathieu Goubel	C-1 1000 m	3:56.972	2 QS	3:57.607	1 Q	3:57.889	7
Arnaud Hybois	K-1 500 m	1:37.902	4 QS	1:43.559	5	Did not advance	
Cyrille Carré; Philippe Colin	K-2 1000 m	3:18.968	3 QF	Bye		3:16.532	6
Bertrand Hémonic; William Tchamba	C-2 500 m	1:43.453	6 QS	1:43.874	6	Did not advance	
Bertrand Hémonic; William Tchamba	C-2 1000 m	3:46.431	5 QS	3:48.406	6	Did not advance	
Sébastien Jouve; Vincent Lecrubier	K-2 500 m	1:29.805	2 QF	Bye		1:31.312	7

Women

Athlete	Event	Heats		Semifinals		Final	
Athlete	Event	Time	Rank	Time	Rank	Time	Rank
Marie Delattre; Anne-Laure Viard	K-2 500 m	1.43.832	2 QF	Bye		1.42.128	3rd place, bronze medalist(s)

Qualification Legend: QS = Qualify to semi-final; QF = Qualify directly to final

== Cycling ==
=== Road ===
Men

Athlete	Event	Time	Rank
Cyril Dessel	Road race	Did not finish	
Pierrick Fédrigo	Road race	Did not finish	
Rémi Pauriol	Road race	6:26:17	34
Jérôme Pineau	Road race	6:24:11	14
Pierre Rolland	Road race	Did not finish	

Women

Athlete	Event	Time	Rank
Christel Ferrier-Bruneau	Road race	3:32:45	13
Jeannie Longo-Ciprelli	Road race	3:32:57	24
Jeannie Longo-Ciprelli	Time trial	35:52.62	4
Maryline Salvetat	Road race	3:32:45	14
Maryline Salvetat	Time trial	38:09.72	20

=== Track ===
Sprint

Athlete	Event	Qualification		Round 1	Round 2	Repechage 2	Quarterfinals	Semifinals	Final	
Athlete	Event	Time Speed (km/h)	Rank	Opposition Time Speed (km/h)	Opposition Time Speed (km/h)	Opposition Time Speed (km/h)	Opposition Time Speed (km/h)	Opposition Time Speed (km/h)	Opposition Time Speed (km/h)	Rank
Mickaël Bourgain	Men's sprint	10.123; 71.125	5 Q	Kitatsuru (JPN); W 10.672; 67.466	Chiappa (ITA); W 10.734; 67.076	Bye	Bos (NED); W 10.524, W 10.463	Hoy (GBR); L, L	Levy (GER); W 11.047, L, W 10.560	3rd place, bronze medalist(s)
Kévin Sireau	Men's sprint	10.098; 71.301	4 Q	Blatchford (USA); W 10.742; 67.026	Bos (NED); L	Watanabe (JPN); Bayley (AUS); W 10.570; 68.117	Kenny (GBR); L, L	Did not advance	5th place final Mulder (NED); Bos (NED); Awang (MAS); W 10.719	5
Grégory Baugé; Kévin Sireau; Arnaud Tournant	Men's team sprint	43.541; 62.010	2 Q	Malaysia; W 43.656; 61.847	—N/a				Great Britain; L 43.651; 61.854	2nd place, silver medalist(s)
Clara Sanchez	Women's sprint	11.365; 63.352	6	Tsylinskaya (BLR); W 11.607; 62.031	—N/a	Bye	Meares (AUS); L, L	Did not advance	5th place final Tsylinskaya (BLR); Reed (USA); Krupeckaitė (LTU); W 12.264	5

Pursuit

Athlete	Event	Qualification		Semifinals		Finals	
Athlete	Event	Time	Rank	Opponent Results	Rank	Opponent Results	Rank
Fabien Sanchez	Men's individual pursuit	4:33.100	15	Did not advance			
Damien Gaudin; Matthieu Ladagnous; Christophe Riblon; Nicolas Rousseau	Men's team pursuit	4:03.679	5 Q	Denmark; DSQ	—	Did not advance	

Keirin

Athlete	Event	1st round	Repechage	2nd round	Finals
Athlete	Event	Rank	Rank	Rank	Rank
Grégory Baugé	Men's keirin	4 R	1 Q	5	7
Arnaud Tournant	Men's keirin	4 R	1 Q	3 Q	6

Omnium

Athlete	Event	Points	Laps	Rank
Christophe Riblon	Men's points race	−17	−1	21
Pascale Jeuland	Women's points race	8	0	7
Matthieu Ladagnous; Jérôme Neuville	Men's madison	12	–1	7

=== Mountain biking ===
Athlete	Event	Time	Rank
Julien Absalon	Men's cross-country	1:55:59	1st place, gold medalist(s)
Jean-Christophe Péraud	Men's cross-country	1:57:06	2nd place, silver medalist(s)
Cédric Ravanel	Men's cross-country	2:01:38	14
Laurence Leboucher	Women's cross-country	2:00:55	17

=== BMX ===
Athlete	Event	Seeding		Quarterfinals		Semifinals		Final	
Athlete	Event	Result	Rank	Points	Rank	Points	Rank	Result	Rank
Thomas Allier	Men's BMX	36.649	19	16	6	Did not advance			
Damien Godet	Men's BMX	36.008	3	13	4 Q	14	4 Q	DNF	8
Anne-Caroline Chausson	Women's BMX	36.660	1	—N/a		4	1 Q	35.976	1st place, gold medalist(s)
Laëtitia Le Corguillé	Women's BMX	37.145	3	—N/a		4	1 Q	38.042	2nd place, silver medalist(s)

== Diving ==
Women

Athlete	Events	Preliminaries		Semifinals		Final	
Athlete	Events	Points	Rank	Points	Rank	Points	Rank
Claire Febvay	10 m platform	255.30	25	Did not advance			
Audrey Labeau	10 m platform	289.95	21	Did not advance			

== Equestrian ==
=== Dressage ===
Athlete	Horse	Event	Grand Prix		Grand Prix Special		Grand Prix Freestyle		Overall	
Athlete	Horse	Event	Score	Rank	Score	Rank	Score	Rank	Score	Rank
Marc Boblet	Whitini Star	Individual	66.125	21 Q	65.640	21	Did not advance			
Julia Chevanne	Calimucho	Individual	63.250	32	Did not advance					
Hubert Perring	Diabolo St Maurice	Individual	66.833	20 Q	62.680	25	Did not advance			
Marc Boblet; Julia Chevanne; Hubert Perring	See above	Team	65.403	8	—N/a				65.403	7

=== Eventing ===
Athlete	Horse	Event	Dressage		Cross-country			Jumping						Total	
Athlete	Horse	Event	Dressage		Cross-country			Qualifier			Final			Total	
Athlete	Horse	Event	Penalties	Rank	Penalties	Total	Rank	Penalties	Total	Rank	Penalties	Total	Rank	Penalties	Rank
Jean Renaud Adde	Haston d'Elpégère	Individual	56.90	53	Eliminated			Did not advance							
Didier Dhennin	Ismène du Temple	Individual	42.80	17	14.00	56.80	7	3.00	59.80	11 Q	0.00	59.80	6	59.80	6
Nicolas Touzaint	Galan de Sauvagère	Individual	Withdrew – Horse injury*												
Eric Vigeanel	Coronado Prior	Individual	53.00	44	26.00	79.00	30	0.00	79.00	23 Q	4.00	83.00	20	83.00	20
Didier Dhennin; Eric Vigeanel; Jean Renaud Adde	See above	Team	152.70	8	983.10	1135.80	11	3.00	1138.80	11	—N/a			1138.80	11

* Nicolas Touzaint, a 2004 team gold medallist, had to withdraw just before the start of the competition because of an injury to his horse. His score was automatically set to 1000.00 for team purposes. When Jean Renaud Adde was later eliminated from the competition for falling off his horse on the cross-country course, the same happened to him, causing an astronomical team score for the cross-country ride.

== Fencing ==
Men

Athlete	Event	Round of 64	Round of 32	Round of 16	Quarterfinal	Semifinal	Final / BM	
Athlete	Event	Opposition Score	Opposition Score	Opposition Score	Opposition Score	Opposition Score	Opposition Score	Rank
Fabrice Jeannet	Individual épée	Katchiourine (KGZ); W 15–14	Kelsey (USA); W 15–11	Tikhomirov (CAN); W 15–7	Jung J-S (KOR); W 15–11	Boczko (HUN); W 15–12	Tagliariol (ITA); L 9–15	2nd place, silver medalist(s)
Jérôme Jeannet	Individual épée	Bye	Novosjolov (EST); W 15–14	Abajo (ESP); L 9–15	Did not advance			
Ulrich Robeiri	Individual épée	Bye	Avdeev (RUS); W 15–11	Tagliariol (ITA); L 11–15	Did not advance			
Fabrice Jeannet; Jérôme Jeannet; Jean-Michel Lucenay; Ulrich Robeiri	Team épée	—N/a		Bye	Venezuela; W 45–33	Italy; W 45–39	Poland; W 45-29	1st place, gold medalist(s)
Brice Guyart	Individual foil	—N/a	Ali (MAR); W 15–3	Le Péchoux (FRA); L 10–15	Did not advance			
Erwann Le Péchoux	Individual foil	—N/a	Bye	Guyart (FRA); W 15–10	Sanzo (ITA); L 9–10	Did not advance		
Nicolas Lopez	Individual sabre	Ouedraogo (BUR); W 15–6	Pozdnyakov (RUS); W 15–8	Oh E-s (KOR); W 15–11	Pina (ESP); W 15–10	Covaliu (ROU); W 15–13	Zhong M (CHN); L 9–15	2nd place, silver medalist(s)
Julien Pillet	Individual sabre	Bye	Wang Jz (CHN); W 15–14	Dumitrescu (ROU); W 15–13	Smart (USA); W 15–13	Zhong M (CHN); L 12–15	Covaliu (ROU); L 11–15	4
Boris Sanson	Individual sabre	Bye	Morehouse (USA); W 15–12	Tarantino (ITA); L 7–15	Did not advance			
Vincent Anstett; Nicolas Lopez; Julien Pillet; Boris Sanson	Team sabre	—N/a			Egypt; W 45–31	Italy; W 45–41	United States; W 45–37	1st place, gold medalist(s)

Women

Athlete	Event	Round of 64	Round of 32	Round of 16	Quarterfinal	Semifinal	Final / BM	
Athlete	Event	Opposition Score	Opposition Score	Opposition Score	Opposition Score	Opposition Score	Opposition Score	Rank
Laura Flessel-Colovic	Individual épée	—N/a	Mills (ISR); W 15–8	Zhong Wp (CHN); W 13–11	Li N (CHN); L 10–15	Did not advance		
Hajnalka Kiraly Picot	Individual épée	—N/a	El Sayed (EGY); W 15–7	Samuelsson (SWE); L 13–15	Did not advance			
Corinne Maîtrejean	Individual foil	Bye	Smart (USA); W 15–9	Wächter (GER); L 10–15	Did not advance			
Léonore Perrus	Individual sabre	Bye	Besbes (TUN); L 11–15	Did not advance				
Anne-Lise Touya	Individual sabre	Bye	Nagy (HUN); L 13–15	Did not advance				
Carole Vergne	Individual sabre	Bye	Kim K-H (KOR); L 14–15	Did not advance				
Solenn Mary; Léonore Perrus; Anne-Lise Touya; Carole Vergne	Team sabre	—N/a			Canada; W 45–22	China; L 38–45	United States; L 38–45	4

== Gymnastics ==
=== Artistic ===
Men
Team

Athlete	Event	Qualification								Final							
Athlete	Event	Apparatus						Total	Rank	Apparatus						Total	Rank
Athlete	Event	F	PH	R	V	PB	HB	Total	Rank	F	PH	R	V	PB	HB	Total	Rank
Thomas Bouhail	Team	15.125	13.850	13.700	16.625 Q	14.675	14.575	88.550	27 Q	15.300	14.375	—N/a	16.475	—N/a			
Benoît Caranobe	Team	15.125	14.250	15.100	16.500 Q	15.275	14.675	90.925	10 Q	14.425	—N/a	15.225	15.950	—N/a			
Yann Cucherat	Team	—N/a				16.000	15.850 Q	—N/a		—N/a				16.050	14.250	—N/a	
Dimitri Karbanenko	Team	14.050	13.700	13.675	16.125	15.500	15.450	88.500	28	14.900	—N/a		15.975	15.375	15.350	—N/a	
Danny Rodrigues	Team	14.200	13.400	15.800 Q	—N/a					—N/a	13.750	16.100	—N/a				
Hamilton Sabot	Team	14.575	14.025	14.375	15.400	15.400	13.975	87.750	30	—N/a	14.800	13.975	—N/a	15.150	15.450	—N/a	
Total	Team	59.025	55.825	58.975	64.650	62.175	60.550	361.200	7 Q	44.625	42.925	45.300	48.400	46.575	45.050	272.875	8

Individual finals

Athlete	Event	Apparatus						Total	Rank
Athlete	Event	F	PH	R	V	PB	HB	Total	Rank
Thomas Bouhail	All-around	15.200	13.400	13.650	15.850	14.425	14.475	87.000	21
Thomas Bouhail	Vault	—N/a			16.537	—N/a		16.537	2nd place, silver medalist(s)
Benoît Caranobe	All-around	15.350	14.875	15.175	16.600	15.050	14.875	91.925	3rd place, bronze medalist(s)
Benoît Caranobe	Vault	—N/a			16.062	—N/a		16.062	5
Yann Cucherat	Horizontal bar	—N/a					14.825	14.825	8
Danny Rodrigues	Rings	—N/a	16.225	—N/a				16.225	5

Marks and ranks from vault qualification differ as two vaults are used to determine event finalists while only the first of those counts toward the all-around total. Thomas Bouhail qualified for the all-around final of the top 24 gymnasts because the number of finalists from the same nation is limited to two. Thus, three gymnasts ranked ahead of him were ineligible.

Women
Team

Athlete	Event	Qualification						Final					
Athlete	Event	Apparatus				Total	Rank	Apparatus				Total	Rank
Athlete	Event	F	V	UB	BB	Total	Rank	F	V	UB	BB	Total	Rank
Rose-Eliandre Bellemare	Team	14.225	14.725	14.400	—N/a			—N/a	14.550	—N/a			
Marine Debauve	Team	14.100	—N/a		14.625	—N/a		—N/a			13.975	—N/a	
Laetitia Dugain	Team	14.325	14.350	14.625	14.975	58.275	22 Q	13.925	—N/a	14.725	14.750	—N/a	
Katheleen Lindor	Team	—N/a	14.900	14.700	14.575	—N/a		—N/a	14.825	14.775	—N/a		
Pauline Morel	Team	14.625	14.350	14.625	14.975	57.450	29	14.625	—N/a	14.675	—N/a		
Marine Petit	Team	14.375	14.350	14.625	14.975	58.350	20 Q	14.775	14.675	—N/a	15.000	—N/a	
Total	Team	57.550	58.825	58.525	58.975	233.875	6 Q	43.325	44.050	44.175	43.725	175.275	7

Individual finals

Athlete	Event	Apparatus				Total	Rank
Athlete	Event	F	V	UB	BB	Total	Rank
Laetitia Dugain	All-around	14.000	14.275	14.275	15.225	56.775	23
Marine Petit	All-around	14.575	14.725	14.400	14.275	57.975	19

=== Trampoline ===
Athlete	Event	Qualification		Final	
Athlete	Event	Score	Rank	Score	Rank
Gregoire Pennes	Men's	68.70	12	Did not advance	

== Handball ==
=== Men's tournament ===
Roster

The following is the France roster in the men's handball tournament of the 2008 Summer Olympics.

Head coach: Claude Onesta

No.	Pos.	Name	Date of birth (age)	Height	App.	Goals	Club
2	RB	Jérôme Fernandez	7 March 1977 (aged 31)	1.99 m	262	1042	(Spain) FC Barcelona Handbol
3	P	Didier Dinart	18 January 1977 (aged 31)	1.97 m	288	136	(Spain) BM Ciudad Real
4	RB	Cédric Burdet	15 November 1974 (aged 33)	1.95 m	220	476	(France) Montpellier HB
5	P	Guillaume Gille	16 July 1976 (aged 32)	1.92 m	245	614	(Germany) HSV Handball
6	CB	Bertrand Gille	24 March 1978 (aged 30)	1.87 m	211	654	(Germany) HSV Handball
8	CB	Daniel Narcisse	16 December 1979 (aged 28)	1.89 m	171	524	(France) Chambéry Savoie Handball
11	LW	Olivier Girault	22 February 1973 (aged 35)	1.83 m	240	551	(France) Paris Handball
12	GK	Daouda Karaboué	11 December 1975 (aged 32)	1.98 m	64		(France) Montpellier HB
13	LB	Nikola Karabatić	11 April 1984 (aged 24)	1.95 m	120	515	(Germany) THW Kiel
14	P	Cristophe Kempe	2 May 1975 (aged 33)	1.93 m	161	249	(France) Fénix Toulouse
16	GK	Thierry Omeyer	2 November 1976 (aged 31)	1.92 m	194		(Germany) THW Kiel
18	RB	Joël Abati	25 April 1970 (aged 38)	1.90 m	196	577	(France) Montpellier HB
19	RW	Luc Abalo	6 September 1984 (aged 23)	1.82 m	74	247	(France) US d'Ivry Handball
21	LW	Michaël Guigou	28 January 1982 (aged 26)	1.79 m	100	351	(France) Montpellier HB
26	LW	Cédric Paty	25 July 1981 (aged 27)	1.94 m	17	44	(France) Chambéry Savoie Handball

Group play

Team	Pld	W	D	L	GF	GA	GD	Pts	Qualification
France	5	4	1	0	148	115	+33	9	Qualified for the quarterfinals
Poland	5	3	1	1	147	128	+19	7	Qualified for the quarterfinals
Croatia	5	3	0	2	140	115	+25	6	Qualified for the quarterfinals
Spain	5	3	0	2	152	145	+7	6	Qualified for the quarterfinals
Brazil	5	1	0	4	129	153	−24	2	
China	5	0	0	5	104	164	−60	0	

10 August 2008; 14:00	France	34 – 26	Brazil	Olympic Sports Centre Gymnasium; Referees: Din, Dinu (ROU)
10 August 2008; 14:00	Girault 7	(19–11)	Ertel 5	Olympic Sports Centre Gymnasium; Referees: Din, Dinu (ROU)
10 August 2008; 14:00	3× (yellow card) 2× (suspension)	Report	3× (yellow card) 4× (suspension)	Olympic Sports Centre Gymnasium; Referees: Din, Dinu (ROU)

12 August 2008; 14:00	China	19 – 33	France	Olympic Sports Centre Gymnasium; Referees: Canbro, Claesson (SWE)
12 August 2008; 14:00	Hao 5	(7–19)	three players 5	Olympic Sports Centre Gymnasium; Referees: Canbro, Claesson (SWE)
12 August 2008; 14:00	3× (yellow card) 4× (suspension)	Report	3× (yellow card) 2× (suspension)	Olympic Sports Centre Gymnasium; Referees: Canbro, Claesson (SWE)

14 August 2008; 20:45	France	23 – 19	Croatia	Olympic Sports Centre Gymnasium; Referees: Chernega, Paladenko (RUS)
14 August 2008; 20:45	Gille 7	(11–9)	Džomba 5	Olympic Sports Centre Gymnasium; Referees: Chernega, Paladenko (RUS)
14 August 2008; 20:45	3× (yellow card) 2× (suspension)	Report	3× (yellow card) 4× (suspension)	Olympic Sports Centre Gymnasium; Referees: Chernega, Paladenko (RUS)

16 August 2008; 14:00	France	28 – 21	Spain	Olympic Sports Centre Gymnasium; Referees: Lemme, Ullrich (GER)
16 August 2008; 14:00	Gille 6	(16–10)	García 7	Olympic Sports Centre Gymnasium; Referees: Lemme, Ullrich (GER)
16 August 2008; 14:00	3× (yellow card) 3× (suspension)	Report	3× (yellow card) 3× (suspension)	Olympic Sports Centre Gymnasium; Referees: Lemme, Ullrich (GER)

18 August 2008; 20:45	Poland	30 – 30	France	Olympic Sports Centre Gymnasium; Referees: Liudowyk, Vakula (UKR)
18 August 2008; 20:45	Jurecki 7	(16–13)	Karabatić 8	Olympic Sports Centre Gymnasium; Referees: Liudowyk, Vakula (UKR)
18 August 2008; 20:45	2× (yellow card) 2× (suspension)	Report	3× (yellow card) 3× (suspension)	Olympic Sports Centre Gymnasium; Referees: Liudowyk, Vakula (UKR)

Quarterfinal

20 August 2008; 12:00	France	27 – 24	Russia	Olympic Sports Centre Gymnasium; Referees: Lemme, Ullrich (GER)
20 August 2008; 12:00	Narcisse 9	(13–10)	Kokcharov 5	Olympic Sports Centre Gymnasium; Referees: Lemme, Ullrich (GER)
20 August 2008; 12:00	4× (yellow card) 2× (suspension)	Report	3× (yellow card) 2× (suspension)	Olympic Sports Centre Gymnasium; Referees: Lemme, Ullrich (GER)

Semifinal

22 August 2008; 18:00	France	25 – 23	Croatia	Beijing National Indoor Stadium; Referees: Chernega, Poladenko (RUS)
22 August 2008; 18:00	Burdet, Narcisse 6	(12–11)	Horvat, Šprem 5	Beijing National Indoor Stadium; Referees: Chernega, Poladenko (RUS)
22 August 2008; 18:00	4× (yellow card) 4× (suspension)	Report	3× (yellow card) 3× (suspension)	Beijing National Indoor Stadium; Referees: Chernega, Poladenko (RUS)

Gold medal game

24 August 2008; 15:45	Iceland	23 – 28	France	Beijing National Indoor Stadium; Referees: Lemme, Ullrich (GER)
24 August 2008; 15:45	Stefánsson 5	(10–15)	Karabatić 8	Beijing National Indoor Stadium; Referees: Lemme, Ullrich (GER)
24 August 2008; 15:45	3× (yellow card) 4× (suspension)	Report	3× (yellow card) 3× (suspension)	Beijing National Indoor Stadium; Referees: Lemme, Ullrich (GER)

Final rank

Gold

=== Women's tournament ===
Roster

The following is the France roster in the women's handball tournament of the 2008 Summer Olympics.

Head coach: Olivier Krumbholz

No.	Pos.	Name	Date of birth (age)	Height	App.	Goals	Club
4	P	Nina Kamto Njitam	5 June 1983 (aged 25)	1.77 m	79	133	(France) Metz Handball
5	RB	Camille Ayglon	21 May 1985 (aged 23)	1.80 m	25	64	(France) HBC Nîmes
8	P	Véronique Pecqueux-Rolland	9 October 1972 (aged 35)	1.72 m	289	870	(France) Cercle Dijon Bourgogne
9	LW	Paule Baudouin	25 October 1984 (aged 23)	1.72 m	59	121	(France) Issy-les-Moulineaux
10	LB	Sophie Herbrecht	13 February 1982 (aged 26)	1.74 m	144	454	(France) Issy-les-Moulineaux
11	RW	Stéphanie Cano	17 April 1974 (aged 34)	1.60 m	231	462	(France) CA Bèglais Handball
12	GK	Amandine Leynaud	2 May 1986 (aged 22)	1.78 m	28		(France) Metz Handball
13	P	Isabelle Wendling	30 January 1971 (aged 37)	1.78 m	325	537	(France) Metz Handball
16	GK	Valérie Nicolas	12 March 1975 (aged 33)	1.78 m	234		(Denmark) Ikast-Brande Elite Håndbold
19	CB	Christine Vanparys-Torres	22 March 1978 (aged 30)	1.78 m	63	98	(France) Metz Handball
20	LW	Raphaëlle Tervel	21 April 1979 (aged 29)	1.78 m	155	263	(Spain) Akaba Bera Bera
21	RW	Maakan Tounkara	12 March 1983 (aged 25)	1.65 m	33	60	(France) Le Havre AC
23	RB	Alexandra Lacrabère	27 April 1987 (aged 21)	1.77 m	11	15	(France) CA Bèglais Handball
24	LB	Mariama Signaté	22 July 1985 (aged 23)	1.88 m	43	110	(France) CJF Fleury-Les-Aubrais

Group play

Team	Pld	W	D	L	GF	GA	GD	Pts	Qualification
Norway	5	5	0	0	154	106	+48	10	Qualified for the quarterfinals
Romania	5	4	0	1	150	112	+38	8	Qualified for the quarterfinals
China	5	2	0	3	122	135	−13	4	Qualified for the quarterfinals
France	5	2	0	3	121	128	−7	4	Qualified for the quarterfinals
Kazakhstan	5	1	1	3	109	137	−28	3	
Angola	5	0	1	4	109	147	−38	1	

9 August 2008; 09:00	France	32 – 21	Angola	Olympic Sports Centre Gymnasium; Referees: Chernega, Poladenko (RUS)
9 August 2008; 09:00	Herbrecht 8	(13–14)	Bengue, Almeida 5	Olympic Sports Centre Gymnasium; Referees: Chernega, Poladenko (RUS)
9 August 2008; 09:00	3× (yellow card) 4× (suspension)	Report	3× (yellow card) 3× (suspension)	Olympic Sports Centre Gymnasium; Referees: Chernega, Poladenko (RUS)

11 August 2008; 09:00	Kazakhstan	18 – 21	France	Olympic Sports Centre Gymnasium; Referees: Breto, Huelin (ESP)
11 August 2008; 09:00	Ajiderskaya 7	(8–10)	Lacrabère 6	Olympic Sports Centre Gymnasium; Referees: Breto, Huelin (ESP)
11 August 2008; 09:00	3× (yellow card) 4× (suspension) 1× (red card)	Report	3× (yellow card) 3× (suspension)	Olympic Sports Centre Gymnasium; Referees: Breto, Huelin (ESP)

13 August 2008; 10:45	Romania	34 – 26	France	Olympic Sports Centre Gymnasium; Referees: Lemme, Ullrich (GER)
13 August 2008; 10:45	Maier 11	(17–13)	Tervel 6	Olympic Sports Centre Gymnasium; Referees: Lemme, Ullrich (GER)
13 August 2008; 10:45	3× (yellow card) 3× (suspension)	Report	3× (yellow card) 4× (suspension)	Olympic Sports Centre Gymnasium; Referees: Lemme, Ullrich (GER)

15 August 2008; 19:00	France	24 – 34	Norway	Olympic Sports Centre Gymnasium; Referees: Krstic, Ljubic (SLO)
15 August 2008; 19:00	Baudouin 6	(12–15)	Nyberg, Riegelhuth 6	Olympic Sports Centre Gymnasium; Referees: Krstic, Ljubic (SLO)
15 August 2008; 19:00	3× (yellow card) 4× (suspension)	Report	3× (yellow card) 3× (suspension)	Olympic Sports Centre Gymnasium; Referees: Krstic, Ljubic (SLO)

17 August 2008; 15:45	France	18 – 21	China	Olympic Sports Centre Gymnasium; Referees: Liudowyk, Vakula (UKR)
17 August 2008; 15:45	Ayglon 5	(10–9)	Wu Wenjuan 5	Olympic Sports Centre Gymnasium; Referees: Liudowyk, Vakula (UKR)
17 August 2008; 15:45	3× (yellow card) 2× (suspension)	Report	3× (yellow card) 6× (suspension)	Olympic Sports Centre Gymnasium; Referees: Liudowyk, Vakula (UKR)

Quarterfinal

19 August 2008
20:15
Russia
32 – 31 (ET)
France
Olympic Sports Centre Gymnasium
Referees: Liu S, Liu F (CHN)
Bliznova 6
(12–16)
Signaté 7
4× (yellow card) 2× (suspension)
Report
4× (yellow card) 4× (suspension)

FT: 24–24 ET: 4–4, 4–3

Classification semifinal

21 August 2008
14:15
Romania
34 – 36 (ET)
France
Beijing National Indoor Stadium
Referees: Līcis, Stoļarovs (LAT)
Maier 9
(13–12)
Baudouin 7
4× (yellow card) 8× (suspension)
Report
4× (yellow card) 8× (suspension)

FT: 27–27 ET: 4–4, 3–5

5th–6th place

23 August 2008; 10:15	China	23 – 31	France	Beijing National Indoor Stadium; Referees: Krstic, Ljubic (SLO)
23 August 2008; 10:15	Liu Yun 7	(10–15)	Herbrecht, Pecqueux-Rolland 7	Beijing National Indoor Stadium; Referees: Krstic, Ljubic (SLO)
23 August 2008; 10:15	3× (yellow card) 1× (suspension)	Report	3× (yellow card) 1× (suspension)	Beijing National Indoor Stadium; Referees: Krstic, Ljubic (SLO)

== Judo ==
Men

Athlete	Event	Preliminary	Round of 32	Round of 16	Quarterfinals	Semifinals	Repechage 1	Repechage 2	Repechage 3	Final / BM	
Athlete	Event	Opposition Result	Opposition Result	Opposition Result	Opposition Result	Opposition Result	Opposition Result	Opposition Result	Opposition Result	Opposition Result	Rank
Dimitri Dragin	−60 kg	Bye	Khergiani (GEO); W 0101–0010	Yekutiel (ISR); W 1000–0000	Kishmakhov (RUS); W 0002–0000	Paischer (AUT); L 0000–1001	Bye			Sobirov (UZB); L 0000–0001	5
Benjamin Darbelet	−66 kg	Bye	Rguig (MAR); W 1002–0000	Mehmedovic (CAN); W 0001–0000	Gadanov (RUS); W 1010–0010	Pak (PRK); W 0201–0001	Bye			Uchishiba (JPN); L 0000–1000	2nd place, silver medalist(s)
Anthony Rodriguez	−81 kg	Bye	Cardenas (CUB); L 0001–0110	Did not advance							
Yves-Matthieu Dafreville	−90 kg	—N/a	González (CUB); W 1000–0000	Meloni (ITA); W 0010–0000	Santos (BRA); W 1011–0001	Benikhlef (ALG); L 0000–0001	Bye			Mesbah (EGY); L 0000–0001	5
Frederic Demontfaucon	−100 kg	—N/a	Ze'evi (ISR); L 0001–0010	Did not advance							
Teddy Riner	+100 kg	Bye	Chedly (TUN); W 0010–0000	Ikhsangaliyev (KAZ); W 1000–0000	Tangriev (UZB); L 0000–0001	Did not advance	Bye	Tölzer (GER); W 0020–0010	Schlittler (BRA); W 1000–0000	Gujejiani (GEO); W 1011–0000	3rd place, bronze medalist(s)

Women

Athlete	Event	Round of 32	Round of 16	Quarterfinals	Semifinals	Repechage 1	Repechage 2	Repechage 3	Final / BM	
Athlete	Event	Opposition Result	Opposition Result	Opposition Result	Opposition Result	Opposition Result	Opposition Result	Opposition Result	Opposition Result	Rank
Frédérique Jossinet	−48 kg	Nurgazina (KAZ); L 0000–1000	Did not advance							
Audrey La Rizza	−52 kg	Heylen (BEL); L 0000–0001	Did not advance							
Barbara Harel	−57 kg	Bye	Kye S-H (PRK); W 0101–0010	Quintavalle (ITA); L 0001–0010	Did not advance	Bye	Bönisch (GER); W 0001–0000	Baczko (HUN); W 0110–0010	Xu Y (CHN); L 0101–1000	5
Lucie Décosse	−63 kg	Žolnir (SLO); W 1010–0000	Schlesinger (ISR); W 0011–0000	von Harnier (GER); W 1001–0001	Won O-I (PRK); W 0211–0000	Bye			Tanimoto (JPN); L 0000–1000	2nd place, silver medalist(s)
Gévrise Émane	−70 kg	Bye	Iglesias (ESP); L 0000–0001	Did not advance						
Stéphanie Possamaï	−78 kg	Briceño (ARG); W 0001–0000	Miled (TUN); W 1010–0012	Castillo (CUB); L 0000–0030	Did not advance	Bye	Abikeyeva (KAZ); W 1010–0001	Wollert (GER); W 0200–0000	San Miguel (ESP); W 0100–0010	3rd place, bronze medalist(s)
Anne-Sophie Mondiere	+78 kg	Shekerova (UZB); W 0200–0000	Tsukada (JPN); L 0001–1000	Did not advance		Bye	Zambotti (MEX); W 1010–0000	Dorjgotov (MGL); L 0000–1000	Did not advance	

== Modern pentathlon ==
Athlete	Event	Shooting (10 m air pistol)			Fencing (épée one touch)			Swimming (200 m freestyle)			Riding (show jumping)			Running (3000 m)			Total points	Final rank
Athlete	Event	Points	Rank	MP Points	Results	Rank	MP points	Time	Rank	MP points	Penalties	Rank	MP points	Time	Rank	MP Points	Total points	Final rank
Jean Maxence Berrou	Men's	176	26	1048	10–25	36	640	2:04.52	14	1308	140	13	1060	9:21.71	15	1116	5172	23
John Zakrzewski	Men's	168	33	952	19–16	10	856	2:04.23	12	1312	DNF	33	160	10:04.15	32	984	4264	34
Amelie Caze	Women's	177	22	1060	22–13	5	928	2:11.29	2	1348	84	16	1116	10:59.82	22	1084	5536	9

== Rowing ==
Men

Athlete	Event	Heats		Repechage		Semifinals		Final	
Athlete	Event	Time	Rank	Time	Rank	Time	Rank	Time	Rank
Laurent Cadot; Erwan Peron	Pair	6:46.57	1 SA/B	Bye		6:44.29	5 FB	6:54.40	9
Adrien Hardy; Jean-Baptiste Macquet	Double sculls	6:21.92	2 SA/B	Bye		6:18.86	1 FA	6:33.36	5
Frédéric Dufour; Maxime Goisset	Lightweight double sculls	6:20.17	2 SA/B	Bye		6:41.18	5 FB	6:32.65	11
Germain Chardin; Julien Desprès; Dorian Mortelette; Benjamin Rondeau	Four	6:05.00	4 R	6:00.01	2 SA/B	5:56.73	3 FA	6:09.31	3rd place, bronze medalist(s)
Julien Bahain; Cedric Berrest; Jonathan Coeffic; Pierre-Jean Peltier	Quadruple sculls	5:41.75	2 SA/B	Bye		5:53.04	3 FA	5:44.34	3rd place, bronze medalist(s)
Jean-Christophe Bette; Guillaume Raineau; Franck Solforosi; Fabien Tilliet	Lightweight four	5:51.68	2 SA/B	Bye		6:07.26	2 FA	5:51.22	4

Women

Athlete	Event	Heats		Repechage		Quarterfinals		Semifinals		Final	
Athlete	Event	Time	Rank	Time	Rank	Time	Rank	Time	Rank	Time	Rank
Sophie Balmary	Single sculls	7:47.37	3 QF	—N/a		7:37.01	2 SA/B	7:56.73	6 FB	7:58.88	12
Stephanie Dechand; Inene Pascal-Pretre	Pair	7:42.92	5 R	7:41.87	4 FB	—N/a				7:36.25	8

Qualification Legend: FA=Final A (medal); FB=Final B (non-medal); FC=Final C (non-medal); FD=Final D (non-medal); FE=Final E (non-medal); FF=Final F (non-medal); SA/B=Semifinals A/B; SC/D=Semifinals C/D; SE/F=Semifinals E/F; QF=Quarterfinals; R=Repechage

== Sailing ==
Men

Athlete	Event	Race											Net points	Final rank
Athlete	Event	1	2	3	4	5	6	7	8	9	10	M*	Net points	Final rank
Julien Bontemps	RS:X	~~13~~	1	5	4	10	8	2	10	2	3	8	53	2nd place, silver medalist(s)
Jean-Baptiste Bernaz	Laser	19	1	12	9	6	10	30	5	~~34~~	CAN	12	104	8
Olivier Bausset; Nicolas Charbonnier	470	6	3	8	1	6	18	3	14	7	~~20~~	12	78	3rd place, bronze medalist(s)
Pascal Rambeau; Xavier Rohart	Star	~~12~~	1	5	4	7	6	9	9	8	2	18	69	6

Women

Athlete	Event	Race											Net points	Final rank
Athlete	Event	1	2	3	4	5	6	7	8	9	10	M*	Net points	Final rank
Faustine Merret	RS:X	8	~~28~~	10	7	11	19	17	18	7	3	EL	100	11
Sarah Steyaert	Laser Radial	11	1	21	3	~~29~~; ~~BFD~~	1	3	10	11	CAN	16	77	5
Gwendolyn Lemaitre; Ingrid Petitjean	470	1	11	16	8	~~17~~	9	9	9	13	9	EL	85	11
Julie Gerecht; Anne Le Helley; Catherine Lepesant	Yngling	4	~~15~~	1	14	5	10	10	2	CAN	CAN	10	56	5

Open

Athlete	Event	Race																Net points	Final rank
Athlete	Event	1	2	3	4	5	6	7	8	9	10	11	12	13	14	15	M*	Net points	Final rank
Guillaume Florent	Finn	5	8	20	3	4	6	4	~~21~~	CAN	CAN	—N/a					8	58	3rd place, bronze medalist(s)
Emmanuel Dyen; Yann Rocherieux	49er	7	8	4	5	11	13	11	13	14	7	6	~~17~~	CAN	CAN	CAN	10	109	10
Christophe Espagnon; Xavier Revil	Tornado	7	2	10	~~16~~	9	10	10	4	10	7	—N/a					EL	69	11

M = Medal race; EL = Eliminated – did not advance into the medal race; CAN = Race cancelled

== Shooting ==
Men

Athlete	Event	Qualification		Final	
Athlete	Event	Points	Rank	Points	Rank
Stéphane Clamens	Trap	112	25	Did not advance	
Franck Dumoulin	10 m air pistol	576	25	Did not advance	
Franck Dumoulin	50 m pistol	548	34	Did not advance	
Josselin Henry	10 m air rifle	587	40	Did not advance	
Josselin Henry	50 m rifle prone	592	23	Did not advance	
Josselin Henry	50 m rifle 3 positions	1151	41	Did not advance	
Walter Lapeyre	10 m air pistol	581	8 Q	680.3	6
Walter Lapeyre	50 m pistol	552	25	Did not advance	
Valérian Sauveplane	50 m rifle prone	594	8 Q	698.8	6
Valérian Sauveplane	50 m rifle 3 positions	1172	6 Q	1267.1	7
Anthony Terras	Skeet	120	3 Q	144 S/O 3	3rd place, bronze medalist(s)
Yves Tronc	Trap	115	17	Did not advance	

Women

Athlete	Event	Qualification		Final	
Athlete	Event	Points	Rank	Points	Rank
Laurence Brize	10 m air rifle	394	19	Did not advance	
Laurence Brize	50 m rifle 3 positions	579	13	Did not advance	
Marie Laure Gigon	10 m air rifle	396	8 Q	497.3	7
Marie Laure Gigon	50 m rifle 3 positions	568	38	Did not advance	
Veronique Girardet	Skeet	63	16	Did not advance	
Delphine Racinet	Trap	62	13	Did not advance	
Brigitte Roy	10 m air pistol	379	23	Did not advance	
Brigitte Roy	25 m pistol	580	15	Did not advance	
Stéphanie Tirode	10 m air pistol	377	33	Did not advance	
Stéphanie Tirode	25 m pistol	577	22	Did not advance	

== Swimming ==
France sent a total of 35 swimmers to these Games, including Alain Bernard and Laure Manaudou.

Men

Athlete	Event	Heat		Semifinal		Final	
Athlete	Event	Time	Rank	Time	Rank	Time	Rank
Alain Bernard	50 m freestyle	21.78	2 Q	21.54	1 Q	21.49	3rd place, bronze medalist(s)
Alain Bernard	100 m freestyle	47.85	1 Q	47.20 WR	1 Q	47.21	1st place, gold medalist(s)
Frédérick Bousquet	100 m butterfly	51.83	11 Q	52.94	16	Did not advance	
Hugues Duboscq	100 m breaststroke	59.67	3 Q	59.83	4 Q	59.37	3rd place, bronze medalist(s)
Hugues Duboscq	200 m breaststroke	2:09.42	4 Q	2:09.97	8 Q	2:08.94	3rd place, bronze medalist(s)
Simon Dufour	200 m backstroke	2:02.00	34	Did not advance			
Fabien Gilot	100 m freestyle	48.42	13 Q	49.00	15	Did not advance	
Pierre Henri	400 m individual medley	4:22.41	22	—N/a		Did not advance	
Christophe Lebon	100 m butterfly	52.56	31	Did not advance			
Christophe Lebon	200 m butterfly	1:56.63	17	Did not advance			
Amaury Leveaux	50 m freestyle	21.46	1 Q	21.76	4 Q	21.45	2nd place, silver medalist(s)
Amaury Leveaux	200 m freestyle	1:47.44	13 Q	Withdrew			
Julien Nicolardot	200 m breaststroke	2:12.76	28	Did not advance			
Pierre Roger	200 m backstroke	1:59.01	17	Did not advance			
Gilles Rondy	10 km open water	—N/a				1:52:16.7	15
Nicolas Rostoucher	400 m freestyle	3:47.15	14	—N/a		Did not advance	
Nicolas Rostoucher	1500 m freestyle	15:00.58	13	—N/a		Did not advance	
Sébastien Rouault	400 m freestyle	3:48.84	23	—N/a		Did not advance	
Sébastien Rouault	1500 m freestyle	15:21.14	27	—N/a		Did not advance	
Benjamin Stasiulis	100 m backstroke	55.08	25	Did not advance			
Alain Bernard; Frédérick Bousquet; Fabien Gilot; Amaury Leveaux; Grégory Mallet*; Boris Steimetz*	4 × 100 m freestyle relay	3:12.36	2 Q	—N/a		3:08.32	2nd place, silver medalist(s)
Sébastien Bodet; Clément Lefert; Amaury Leveaux; Matthieu Madelaine	4 × 200 m freestyle relay	7:13.57	10	—N/a		Did not advance	
Hugues Duboscq; Fabien Gilot; Christophe Lebon; Benjamin Stasiulis	4 × 100 m medley relay	3:34.78	9	—N/a		Did not advance	

* Competed in the heats only

Women

Athlete	Event	Heat		Semifinal		Final	
Athlete	Event	Time	Rank	Time	Rank	Time	Rank
Joanne Andraca	400 m individual medley	4:43.88	23	—N/a		Did not advance	
Coralie Balmy	400 m freestyle	4:04.25	6 Q	—N/a		4:03.60	4
Coralie Balmy	800 m freestyle	8:28.34	12	—N/a		Did not advance	
Alexianne Castel	100 m backstroke	1:01.44	23	Did not advance			
Alexianne Castel	200 m backstroke	2:09.37	9 Q	2:10.04	13	Did not advance	
Céline Couderc	50 m freestyle	25.22	34	Did not advance			
Sophie de Ronchi	200 m breaststroke	2:30.93	30	Did not advance			
Ophélie-Cyrielle Étienne	200 m freestyle	1:57.93	11 Q	1:58.00	8 Q	1:57.83	7
Sophie Huber	800 m freestyle	8:33.76	19	—N/a		Did not advance	
Laure Manaudou	400 m freestyle	4:04.93	8 Q	—N/a		4:11.26	8
Laure Manaudou	100 m backstroke	1:00.09	5 Q	1:00.19	8 Q	1:00.10	7
Laure Manaudou	200 m backstroke	2:09.39	8 Q	2:12.04	15	Did not advance	
Malia Metella	50 m freestyle	24.95	10 Q	24.89	12	Did not advance	
Malia Metella	100 m freestyle	54.12	11 Q	54.20	9	Did not advance	
Aurore Mongel	200 m freestyle	1:58.11	15 Q	1:58.08	10	Did not advance	
Aurore Mongel	100 m butterfly	58.30	10 Q	58.46	9	Did not advance	
Aurore Mongel	200 m butterfly	2:06.49	2 Q	2:07.21	7 Q	2:07.36	6
Camille Muffat	200 m individual medley	2:12.16	7 Q	2:12.36	12	Did not advance	
Camille Muffat	400 m individual medley	4:40.29	19	—N/a		Did not advance	
Aurélie Muller	10 km open water	—N/a				2:02:04.1	21
Alena Popchanka	100 m freestyle	54.86	18	Did not advance			
Alena Popchanka	100 m butterfly	58.40	14 Q	58.55	=10	Did not advance	
Magali Rousseau	200 m butterfly	2:13.12	28	Did not advance			
Cylia Vabre	200 m individual medley	2:14.34	21	Did not advance			
Céline Couderc; Ophélie-Cyrielle Étienne; Malia Metella*; Alena Popchanka; Hanna Shcherba-Lorgeril	4 × 100 m freestyle relay	3:37.76	5 Q	—N/a		3:37.68	6
Coralie Balmy; Céline Couderc*; Ophélie-Cyrielle Étienne; Aurore Mongel; Camille Muffat; Alena Popchanka*	4 × 200 m freestyle relay	7:50.37 OR	1 Q	—N/a		7:50.66	5
Alexianne Castel; Sophie de Ronchi; Aurore Mongel; Alena Popchanka	4 × 100 m medley relay	4:02.95	11	—N/a		Did not advance	

* Competed in the heats only

== Synchronized swimming ==
France will have two entrants in synchronized swimming, competing in the duet event.

Athlete	Event	Technical routine		Free routine (preliminary)			Free routine (final)		
Athlete	Event	Points	Rank	Points	Total (technical + free)	Rank	Points	Total (technical + free)	Rank
Apolline Dreyfuss; Lila Meesseman-Bakir	Duet	44.750	11	45.250	90.000	11 Q	45.583	90.333	11

== Table tennis ==
Athlete	Event	Preliminary round	Round 1	Round 2	Round 3	Round 4	Quarterfinals	Semifinals	Final / BM	
Athlete	Event	Opposition Result	Opposition Result	Opposition Result	Opposition Result	Opposition Result	Opposition Result	Opposition Result	Opposition Result	Rank
Patrick Chila	Men's singles	Bye	Jakab (HUN); L 3–4	Did not advance						
Damien Éloi	Men's singles	Bye	Saleh (EGY); W 4–3	Mizutani (JPN); L 3–4	Did not advance					
Christophe Legoût	Men's singles	Bye	Doan (VIE); L 2–4	Did not advance						
Xian Yi Fang	Women's singles	Bye	Xu J (POL); W 4–3	Lau S F (HKG); L 1–4	Did not advance					

== Taekwondo ==
Athlete	Event	Round of 16	Quarterfinals	Semifinals	Repechage	Bronze Medal	Final	
Athlete	Event	Opposition Result	Opposition Result	Opposition Result	Opposition Result	Opposition Result	Opposition Result	Rank
Mickael Borot	Men's +80 kg	Keita (MLI); L 5–6	Did not advance					
Gwladys Épangue	Women's −67 kg	Nurkina (KAZ); W 3–0	Benabderrassoul (MAR); W 1–1 SUP	Hwang K-S (KOR); L 1–2	Bye	Morgan (AUS); W 4–1	Did not advance	3rd place, bronze medalist(s)

== Tennis ==
Men

Athlete	Event	Round of 64	Round of 32	Round of 16	Quarterfinals	Semifinals	Final / BM	
Athlete	Event	Opposition Score	Opposition Score	Opposition Score	Opposition Score	Opposition Score	Opposition Score	Rank
Michaël Llodra	Singles	Štěpánek (CZE); W 4–6, 7–6^{(7–5)}, 11–9	Andreev (RUS); L 4–6, 6–3, 1–6	Did not advance				
Paul-Henri Mathieu	Singles	Lapentti (ECU); W 7–6^{(7–4)}, 6–2	Davydenko (RUS); W 7–5, 6–3	Kiefer (GER); W 6–3, 7–5	González (CHI); L 4–6, 4–6	Did not advance		
Gaël Monfils	Singles	Almagro (ESP); W 6–4, 3–6, 6–3	Hănescu (ROU); W 6–4, 7–6^{(7–5)}	Nalbandian (ARG); W 6–4, 6–4	Đoković (SRB); L 6–4, 1–6, 4–6	Did not advance		
Gilles Simon	Singles	Söderling (SWE); W 6–4, 6–4	Cañas (ARG); W 7–5, 6–1	Blake (USA); L 4–6, 2–6	Did not advance			
Arnaud Clément; Michaël Llodra	Doubles	—N/a	Erlich / Ram (ISR); W 6–4, 6–4	A Murray / J Murray (GBR); W 6–1, 6–3	Andreev / Davydenko (RUS); W 6–2, 6–7^{(4–7)}, 6–4	Aspelin / Johansson (SWE); L 6–7^{(6–8)}, 6–4, 17–19	B Bryan / M Bryan (USA); L 6–3, 3–6, 4–6	4
Gaël Monfils; Gilles Simon	Doubles	—N/a	Bhupathi / Paes (IND); L 3–6, 3–6	Did not advance				

Women

Athlete	Event	Round of 64	Round of 32	Round of 16	Quarterfinals	Semifinals	Final / BM	
Athlete	Event	Opposition Score	Opposition Score	Opposition Score	Opposition Score	Opposition Score	Opposition Score	Rank
Alizé Cornet	Singles	Vaidišová (CZE); W 4–6, 6–1, 6–4	Peng S (CHN); W 6–2, 6–2	S Williams (USA); L 6–3, 3–6, 4–6	Did not advance			
Tatiana Golovin	Singles	Withdrew from the singles tournament due to injury on 9 August 2008						
Pauline Parmentier	Singles	Cibulková (SVK); L 1–6, 5–7	Did not advance					
Virginie Razzano	Singles	Daniilidou (GRE); W 6–3, 6–3	Kanepi (EST); L 4–6, 5–7	Did not advance				
Alizé Cornet; Virginie Razzano	Doubles	—N/a	Chan Y-j / Chuang C-j (TPE); L 6–7^{(2–7)}, 7–6^{(7–3)}, 5–7	Did not advance				
Tatiana Golovin; Pauline Parmentier	Doubles	Withdrew from the doubles tournament due to Golovin's injury on 9 August 2008						

== Triathlon ==
Athlete	Event	Swim (1.5 km)	Trans 1	Bike (40 km)	Trans 2	Run (10 km)	Total Time	Rank
Frederic Belaubre	Men's	18:03	0:28	59:11	0:30	31:48	1:50:00.30	10
Tony Moulai	Men's	18:27	0:29	58:49	0:30	Did not finish		
Laurent Vidal	Men's	18:49	0:29	58:24	0:29	34:51	1:53:02.79	36
Jessica Harrison	Women's	19:56	0:30	1:04:14	0:32	36:19	2:01:31.74	12
Carole Péon	Women's	20:22	0:31	1:06:41	0:35	37:55	2:06:04.28	34

== Weightlifting ==
Athlete	Event	Snatch		Clean & Jerk		Total	Rank
Athlete	Event	Result	Rank	Result	Rank	Total	Rank
Vencelas Dabaya	Men's −69 kg	151	5	187	2	338	2nd place, silver medalist(s)
Giovanni Bardis	Men's −77 kg	156	10	173	17	329	14
Benjamin Hennequin	Men's −85 kg	162	10	205	3	367	6
Mélanie Noël	Women's −48 kg	80	6	97	7	177	7

== Wrestling ==
Key:

- VT – Victory by Fall.
- PP – Decision by Points – the loser with technical points.
- PO – Decision by Points – the loser without technical points.

Men's freestyle

Athlete	Event	Qualification	Round of 16	Quarterfinal	Semifinal	Repechage 1	Repechage 2	Final / BM	
Athlete	Event	Opposition Result	Opposition Result	Opposition Result	Opposition Result	Opposition Result	Opposition Result	Opposition Result	Rank
Vincent Aka-Akesse	−96 kg	Bye	Gazyumov (AZE); L 0–3 ^{PO}	Did not advance					18

Men's Greco-Roman

Athlete	Event	Qualification	Round of 16	Quarterfinal	Semifinal	Repechage 1	Repechage 2	Final / BM	
Athlete	Event	Opposition Result	Opposition Result	Opposition Result	Opposition Result	Opposition Result	Opposition Result	Opposition Result	Rank
Sébastien Hidalgo	−60 kg	Bye	Monzón (CUB); L 1–3 ^{PP}	Did not advance					13
Steeve Guénot	−66 kg	Milián (CUB); W 3–1 ^{PP}	Lőrincz (HUN); W 3–1 ^{PP}	Siamionau (BLR); W 3–1 ^{PP}	Bayakhmetov (KAZ); W 3–1 ^{PP}	Bye		Begaliev (KGZ); W 3–1 ^{PP}	1st place, gold medalist(s)
Christophe Guénot	−74 kg	Bye	Kvirkvelia (GEO); L 0–3 ^{PO}	Did not advance		Bye	Schneider (GER); W 3–1 ^{PP}	Bácsi (HUN); W 3–1 ^{PP}	3rd place, bronze medalist(s)
Mélonin Noumonvi	−84 kg	Bye	Minguzzi (ITA); L 1–3 ^{PP}	Did not advance		Bye	Mishin (RUS); W 3–1 ^{PP}	Abrahamian (SWE); L 1–3 ^{PP}*	5
Yannick Szczepaniak	−120 kg	Bye	Ivanov (BUL); W 3–1 ^{PP}	Deák-Bárdos (HUN); W 3–1 ^{PP}	Baroev (RUS); L 1–3 ^{PP}	Bye		Mizgaitis (LTU); L 1–3 ^{PP}	3rd place, bronze medalist(s)

- Ara Abrahamian of Sweden, who beat Melonin Noumonvi for bronze in the 84 kg class, was stripped of his medal for violating the spirit of fair play. However, the medal was not handed to Noumonvi or any other wrestler.
- Yannick Szczepaniak originally finished fifth, but in November 2016, he was promoted to bronze due to disqualification of Khasan Baroev.

Women's freestyle

Athlete	Event	Qualification	Round of 16	Quarterfinal	Semifinal	Repechage 1	Repechage 2	Final / BM	
Athlete	Event	Opposition Result	Opposition Result	Opposition Result	Opposition Result	Opposition Result	Opposition Result	Opposition Result	Rank
Vanessa Boubryemm	−48 kg	Caripá (VEN); W 3–0 ^{PO}	Rakhmanova (RUS); W 3–1 ^{PP}	Chun (USA); L 1–3 ^{PP}	Did not advance				7
Lise Golliot-Legrand	−63 kg	Bye	Méndez (ESP); W 3–0 ^{PO}	Michalik (POL); W 3–1 ^{PP}	Kartashova (RUS); L 1–3 ^{PP}	Bye		Shalygina (KAZ); L 1–3 ^{PP}	5
Audrey Prieto	−72 kg	—N/a	Schätzle (GER); L 0–5 ^{VT}	Did not advance					14

== See also ==
- France at the 2008 Summer Paralympics
