= Men's sabre at the 2011 World Fencing Championships =

Men's Fencing Event

The Men's sabre event of the 2011 World Fencing Championships took place on October 11, 2011.

== Medalists ==
Gold	Aldo Montano (ITA)
Silver	Nicolas Limbach (GER)
Bronze	Gu Bon-gil (KOR)
Bronze	Luigi Tarantino (ITA)

== Draw ==
=== Finals ===
Semi-finals
(Italy) Aldo Montano	15
(South Korea) Gu Bon-gil	12
(Germany) Nicolas Limbach	15
(Italy) Luigi Tarantino	12

Final
(Italy) Aldo Montano	15
(Germany) Nicolas Limbach	13

=== Top half ===
==== Section 1 ====
Round of 64
(South Korea) Won Woo-young	15
(Tunisia) Hichem Smandi	9
(Ukraine) Andriy Yagodka	14
(Ukraine) Dmytro Pundyk	15
(Russia) Pavel Bykov	15
(Hungary) Balázs Lontay	11
(Georgia (country)) Sandro Bazadze	9
(Romania) Florin Zalomir	15
(France) Boladé Apithy	11
(Canada) Philippe Beaudry	15
(Romania) Cosmin Hănceanu	8
(Belarus) Valery Pryiemka	15
(South Korea) Oh Eun-seok	15
(Canada) Joseph Polossifakis	12
(Turkey) Caglayan Firat	6
(Italy) Aldo Montano	15

Round of 32
(South Korea) Won Woo-young	15
(Ukraine) Dmytro Pundyk	5
(Russia) Pavel Bykov	15
(Romania) Florin Zalomir	14
(Canada) Philippe Beaudry	15
(Belarus) Valery Pryiemka	14
(South Korea) Oh Eun-seok	8
(Italy) Aldo Montano	15

Round of 16
(South Korea) Won Woo-young	15
(Russia) Pavel Bykov	7
(Canada) Philippe Beaudry	6
(Italy) Aldo Montano	15

Quarterfinals
(South Korea) Won Woo-young	8
(Italy) Aldo Montano	15

==== Section 2 ====
Round of 64
(Romania) Rareș Dumitrescu	15
(Ukraine) Dmytro Boyko	8
(Belarus) Alexei Romanovitch	7
(Russia) Veniamin Reshetnikov	15
(Hungary) Zsolt Nemcsik	15
(United States) James Williams	8
(South Korea) Kim Jung-hwan	8
(Italy) Diego Occhuizzi	15
(United States) Daryl Homer	13
(Romania) Tiberiu Dolniceanu	15
(Hungary) Tamás Decsi	14
(France) Nicolas Lopez	15
(Belgium) Seppe van Holsbeke	15
(Ukraine) Oleh Shturbabin	9
(Hong Kong) Low Ho Tin	9
(South Korea) Gu Bon-gil	15

Round of 32
(Romania) Rareș Dumitrescu	14
(Russia) Veniamin Reshetnikov	15
(Hungary) Zsolt Nemcsik	14
(Italy) Diego Occhuizzi	15
(Romania) Tiberiu Dolniceanu	15
(France) Nicolas Lopez	14
(Belgium) Seppe van Holsbeke	8
(South Korea) Gu Bon-gil	15

Round of 16
(Russia) Veniamin Reshetnikov	15
(Italy) Diego Occhuizzi	9
(Romania) Tiberiu Dolniceanu	13
(South Korea) Gu Bon-gil	15

Quarterfinals
(Russia) Veniamin Reshetnikov	14
(South Korea) Gu Bon-Gil	15

=== Bottom half ===
==== Section 3 ====
Round of 64
(Germany) Nicolas Limbach	15
(Australia) James Walsh	3
(Brazil) Renzo Agresta	12
(Germany) Max Hartung	15
(Canada) Max Stearns	15
(Greece) Jason Dourakos	12
(Spain) Jaime Martí	11
(Italy) Gianpiero Pastore	15
(France) Julien Pillet	15
(Senegal) Mamoudou Keita	8
(Georgia (country)) Kakhaber Magradze	15
(Spain) Fernando Casares	11
(China) Wang Jingzhi	15
(Japan) Ryo Miyayama	5
(Benin) Yemi Apithy	11
(Hungary) Áron Szilágyi	15

Round of 32
(Germany) Nicolas Limbach	15
(Germany) Max Hartung	10
(Canada) Max Stearns	6
(Italy) Gianpiero Pastore	15
(France) Julien Pillet	15
(Georgia (country)) Kakhaber Magradze	8
(China) Wang Jingzhi	11
(Hungary) Áron Szilágyi	15

Round of 16
(Germany) Nicolas Limbach	15
(Italy) Gianpiero Pastore	12
(France) Julien Pillet	10
(Hungary) Áron Szilágyi	15

Quarterfinals
(Germany) Nicolas Limbach	15
(Hungary) Áron Szilágyi	10

==== Section 4 ====
Round of 64
(Italy) Luigi Tarantino	15
(Colombia) Edwin Romero	3
(China) Zhong Man	15
(Belarus) Aliaksandr Buikevich	14
(France) Julien Médard	15
(China) Liu Xiao	12
(Turkey) Ibrahim Ant	14
(Russia) Nikolay Kovalev	15
(Belarus) Dmitri Lapkes	15
(United States) Tim Morehouse	14
(Germany) Benedikt Wagner	15
(Germany) Björn Hübner	6
(China) Jiang Kelü	14
(Canada) Vincent Couturier	15
(United Kingdom) James Honeybone	10
(Russia) Aleksey Yakimenko	15

Round of 32
(Italy) Luigi Tarantino	15
(China) Zhong Man	10
(France) Julien Médard	9
(Russia) Nikolay Kovalev	15
(Belarus) Dmitri Lapkes	15
(Germany) Benedikt Wagner	9
(Canada) Vincent Couturier	8
(Russia) Aleksey Yakimenko	15

Round of 16
(Italy) Luigi Tarantino	15
(Russia) Nikolay Kovalev	8
(Belarus) Dmitri Lapkes	15
(Russia) Aleksey Yakimenko	14

Quarterfinals
(Italy) Luigi Tarantino	15
(Belarus) Dmitri Lapkes	7
