= Abdoulaye Thiam =

Senegalese fencer

Personal information
- Nationality: Senegal
- Born: 1 January 1984 (age 42)
- Height: 1.83 m (6 ft 0 in)

Sport
- Sport: Fencing
- Event: Sabre

Abdoulaye Thiam (born January 1, 1984) is a Senegalese sabre fencer. Thiam represented Senegal at the 2008 Summer Olympics in Beijing, where he competed in the men's individual sabre event, along with his teammate Mamadou Keita. He lost the first preliminary round match to U.S. fencer Jason Rogers, with a score of 10–15.
