= Mamadou Keita =

Mamadou Keita may refer to:

- Mamadou Keita (fencer)
- Mamadou Keita (basketball)
- Mamadou Keita (judoka)
