= Jaime Martí =

Spanish fencer

Personal information
- Full name: Jaime Martí Marcos
- Nationality: Spain
- Born: 5 October 1979 (age 46) Madrid, Spain
- Height: 1.93 m (6 ft 4 in)
- Weight: 80 kg (176 lb)

Sport
- Sport: Fencing
- Event: Sabre

Jaime Martí Marcos (born 5 October 1979 in Madrid) is a Spanish sabre fencer. Marti represented Spain at the 2008 Summer Olympics in Beijing, where he competed in the men's individual sabre event, along with his teammate Jorge Pina. He defeated Russia's Nikolay Kovalev in the preliminary round of thirty-two, before losing out his next match to China's Zhong Man, with a sudden death score of 14–15.
