= Julien Ouedraogo =

Burkinabé fencer

Personal information
- Nationality: Burkina Faso
- Born: 16 February 1982 (age 44)
- Height: 1.90 m (6 ft 3 in)
- Weight: 73 kg (161 lb)

Sport
- Sport: Fencing
- Event: Sabre

Julien Ouedraogo (born February 16, 1982) is a Burkinabé sabre fencer. Ouedraogo made an official debut for his sporting discipline at the 2008 Summer Olympics in Beijing, where he competed in the individual sabre event. He lost the first preliminary match to France's Nicolas Lopez, with a score of 6–15.
