= Julien Nicolardot =

French swimmer

Personal information
- Full name: Julien Nicolardot
- National team: France
- Born: 13 December 1981 (age 44) Dijon, Côte-d'Or, France
- Height: 1.92 m (6 ft 4 in)
- Weight: 87 kg (192 lb)

Sport
- Sport: Swimming
- Strokes: Breaststroke
- Club: Mulhouse Olympic Natation
- Coach: Lionel Horter

Julien Nicolardot (born 13 December 1981) is a French swimmer, who specialized in breaststroke events. He is a member of Mulhouse Olympic Natation in Mulhouse, and is coached and trained by Lionel Horter.

Nicolardot competed as a lone French swimmer in the men's 200 m breaststroke at the 2008 Summer Olympics in Beijing. He fired off a scintillating 2:13.36 to immediately punch his ticket to Beijing at the French Championships in Dunkirk, bettering the insurmountable FINA A-standard (2:13.70) by more than a third (0.33) of a second. Swimming on the outside in heat four, Nicolardot headed into the final lap with Austria's Hunor Mate and Kazakhstan's Yevgeniy Ryzhkov racing against each other in a sprint finish for the top three spot, but faded nearly to fifth with a steady 2:12.44, nearly a second faster than his entry time. Nicolardot failed to advance to the semifinals, as he placed twenty-eighth overall out of fifty-three swimmers in the prelims.
