= Marcin Koniusz =

Polish fencer (born 1983)

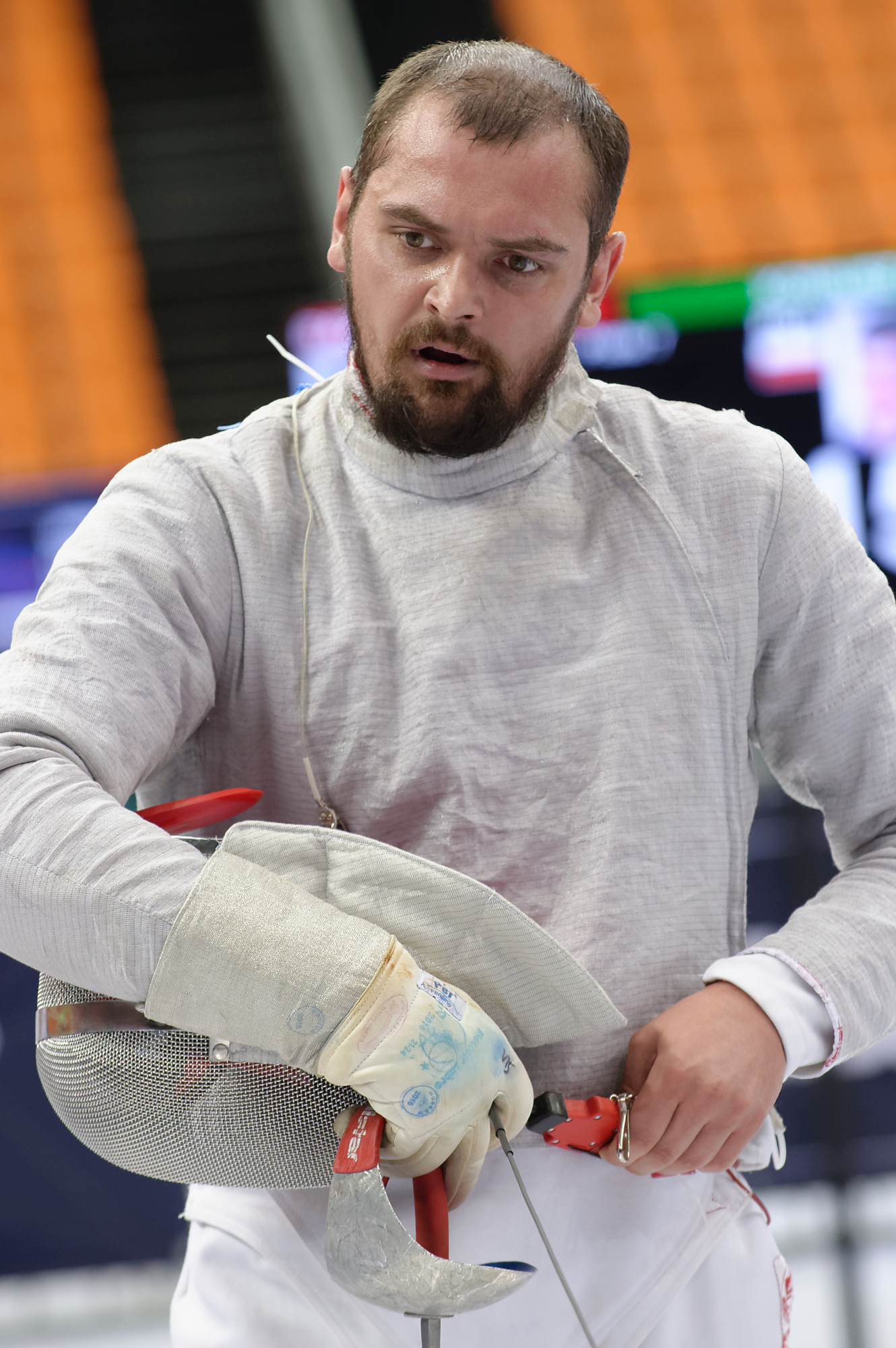

Personal information
- Full name: Marcin Krzysztof Koniusz
- Nationality: Poland
- Born: 12 September 1983 (age 42) Sosnowiec, Poland
- Height: 1.85 m (6 ft 1 in)
- Weight: 85 kg (187 lb)

Fencing career
- Sport: Fencing
- Weapon: Sabre
- Hand: right-handed
- Club: AZS AWF Katowice
- Personal coach: Tadeusz Pigula
- FIE ranking: current ranking
Medal record
Men's sabre
Representing Poland
European Championships
Silver medal – second place	2004 Copenhagen	Individual
Silver medal – second place	2004 Copenhagen	Team
Silver medal – second place	2005 Zalaegerszeg	Team
Bronze medal – third place	2003 Bourges	Team

Marcin Krzysztof Koniusz (born 12 September 1983 in Sosnowiec) is a Polish sabre fencer. He won a total of four medals, including a silver in the individual event, at the European Fencing Championships (2003 in Bourges, France, 2004 in Copenhagen, Denmark, and 2005 in Zalaegerszeg, Hungary).

Koniusz represented Poland at the 2008 Summer Olympics in Beijing, where he competed for the men's individual sabre. He defeated Venezuela's Carlos Bravo in the first preliminary round, before losing out his next match to German fencer Nicolas Limbach, with a final score of 7–15.
