= Nicolas Limbach =

German fencer

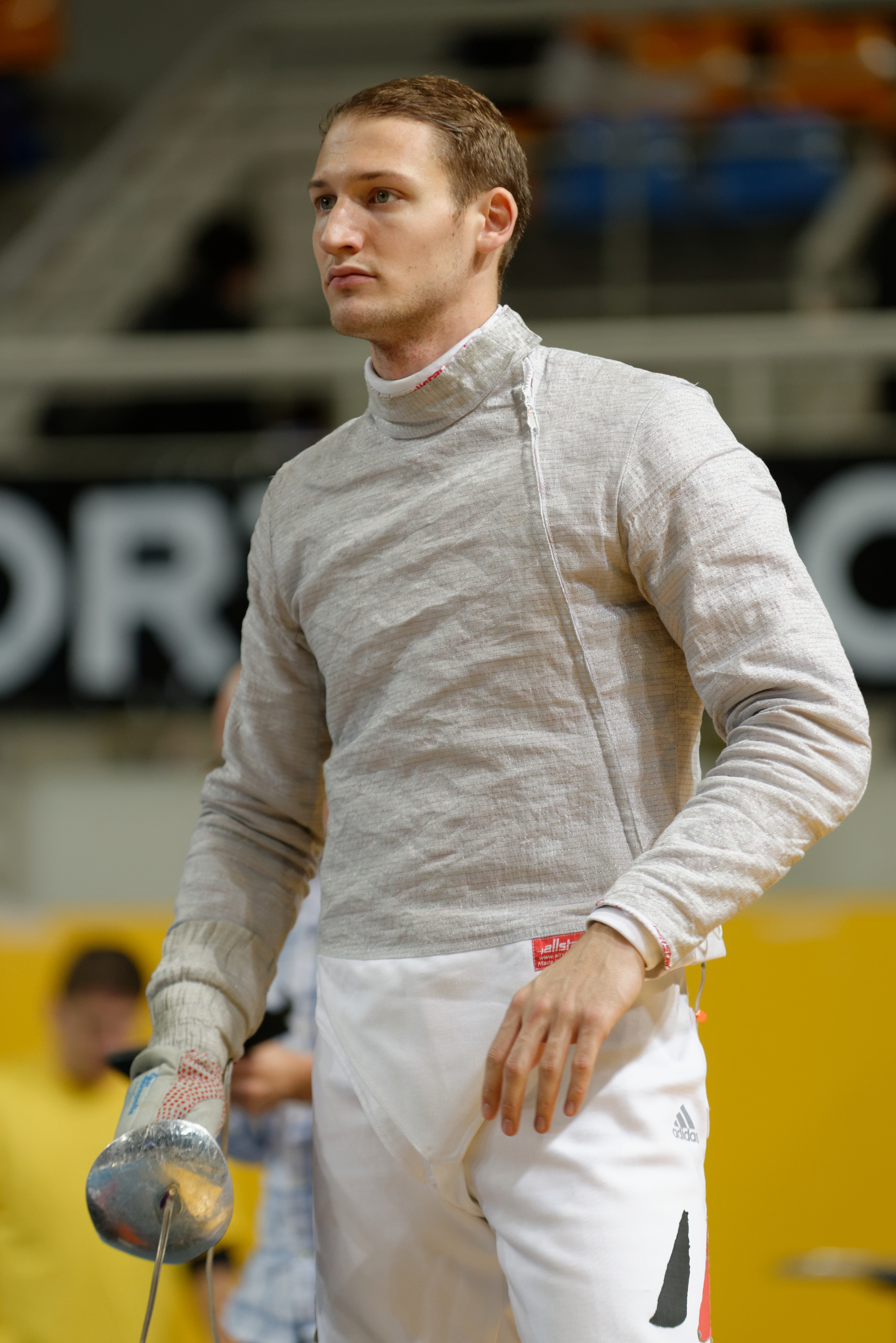
- Limbach at the 2013 team France national championships

Personal information
- Nationality: German
- Born: 29 December 1985 (age 40) Eupen, Belgium
- Height: 1.94 m (6 ft 4 in)
- Weight: 91 kg (201 lb; 14.3 st)

Fencing career
- Sport: Fencing
- Weapon: sabre
- Hand: right-handed
- National coach: Vilmoș Szabo
- Club: TSV Bayer Dormagen
- Head coach: Vilmoș Szabo
- FIE ranking: current ranking
Medal record
World Championships
Gold medal – first place	2009 Antalya	Individual
Gold medal – first place	2014 Kazan	Team
Silver medal – second place	2010 Paris	Individual
Silver medal – second place	2011 Catania	Individual
Bronze medal – third place	2007 St. Petersburg	Individual
Bronze medal – third place	2015 Moscow	Team
European Championships
Silver medal – second place	2010 Leipzig	Individual
Silver medal – second place	2011 Sheffield	Team
Bronze medal – third place	2008 Kyiv	Individual
Bronze medal – third place	2010 Leipzig	Team
Bronze medal – third place	2012 Legnano	Team

Nicolas Limbach (born 29 December 1985) is a German fencer, world champion in 2009 and team world champion in 2014. He won the Fencing World Cup in 2008–2009, 2009–2010 and 2011–2012.

== Biography ==
Limbach was born in a family closely involved in fencing: his father directs the fencing section of TSV Bayer Dormagen and his younger sister Anna also fences for Germany. He took up the sport at the age of six.

In 2005, Limbach won a gold medal in the individual and the team events of the Junior World Championships in Linz. The same year, he climbed his first podium in the Fencing World Cup with a victory in Athens and he joined the national senior team. At the 2005 European Championships, he reached the quarter-finals. At the 2007 World Fencing Championships, he won the bronze medal after losing to Italy's Aldo Montano.

A bronze medal in the Plovdiv World Cup allowed him to qualify to the 2008 Summer Olympics in Beijing. In the individual event, he defeated 15–7 Marcin Koniusz of Poland in the table of 32, then lost 14–15 to Aliaksandr Buikevich of Belarus.

He defeated Rareș Dumitrescu of Romania to win the 2009 World Championships in Antalya. He also won a silver medal at the 2010 and 2011 World Fencing Championships.

He won the World Cup 2009 and 2010. The TSV Bayer Dormagen athlete is only the second German to have ever won a gold medal with the sabre after Felix Becker in 1994.

At the 2012 Summer Olympics, he reached the quarter-finals in men's individual sabre. He was also on the German Men's Sabre team which finished fifth. He won the 2015 Seoul Grand Prix.
