= Satoshi Ogawa =

Japanese fencer (born 1983)

Personal information
- Nickname: Nexus
- Nationality: Japan
- Born: 27 May 1983 (age 43) Tokyo, Japan
- Height: 178 cm (5 ft 10 in)
- Weight: 65 kg (143 lb)

Sport
- Sport: Fencing
- Event: Sabre
Medal record
Men's fencing
Representing Japan
Asian Games
Bronze medal – third place	2010 Guangzhou	Team sabre

Satoshi Ogawa (小川 聡, Ogawa Satoshi; born 27 May 1983 in Tokyo) is a Japanese sabre fencer. He won a bronze medal, as a member of the Japanese fencing team, at the 2010 Asian Games in Guangzhou, China.

Ogawa represented Japan at the 2008 Summer Olympics in Beijing, where he competed in the men's individual sabre event. He lost his only bout in his first preliminary round match to Senegal's Mamadou Keita, with a sudden death score of 14–15.
