= Cédric Burdet =

French handball player (born 1974)

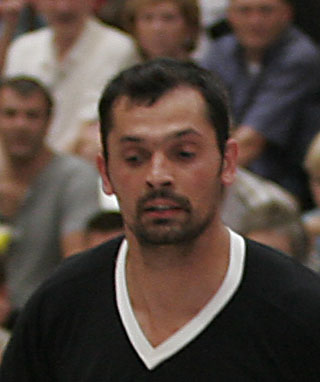
- Burdet in 2007

Personal information
- Nationality: French
- Born: 15 November 1974 (age 51) Belley, Ain, France
- Height: 1.95 m (6 ft 5 in)

Sport
- Sport: Handball
- Position: Right back

Senior clubs
- Years: Team
- -1995: Chambéry Savoie Handball
- 1995-2003: Montpellier Handball
- 2003-2006: VfL Gummersbach
- 2006-2009: Montpellier Handball
National team
Years	Team	Apps	(Gls)
1997-2008	France	227	(491)
Medal record
Men's handball
Representing France
Olympic Games
Gold medal – first place	2008 Beijing	Team competition
Mediterranean Games
Bronze medal – third place	2001 Tunis	Team competition

Cédric Burdet (born 15 November 1974) is a retired French handball player who played most of his career in French handball team Montpellier HB until his retirement in 2009 (with a national championship victory). He also played for Chambéry Savoie Handball in France and VfL Gummersbach in Germany.

His career with the national team (from 1997 to 2008) included three Olympic Games, including winning the gold medal at the 2008 Summer Olympics, where he was instrumental to the victory of France against Croatia in the semi-finals where he scored 5 goals in the first half, and in the final against Iceland, where he scored 4 goals.
