= Boris Sanson =

French sabre fencer (born 1980)

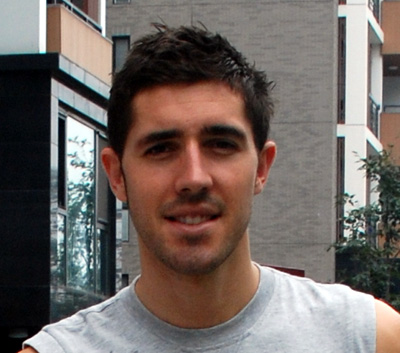

Medal record

Men's fencing

Representing France

Olympic Games
Gold medal – first place	2008 Beijing	Team sabre

Mediterranean Games
Bronze medal – third place	2005 Almería	Individual sabre

Boris Louis Sanson (born 7 December 1980 in Bordeaux, France) is a French sabre fencer.

Sanson won the gold medal in the sabre team event at the 2006 World Fencing Championships in Turin after beating Spain in the final. He accomplished this with his teammates Vincent Anstett, Julien Pillet and Nicolas Lopez. He competed at the 2008 Beijing Olympics for France, winning a team gold medal and finishing 14th in the individual event.

== Achievements ==
2005 World Fencing Championships, team sabre
2006 World Fencing Championships, team sabre
2007 World Fencing Championships, team sabre
2008 Beijing Olympics, team sabre
