= Dmitry Lapkes =

Belarusian fencer (born 1976)

Personal information
- Born: 4 June 1976 (age 50) Minsk, Belarus

Sport
- Sport: Fencing
Medal record
Representing Belarus
World Championships
Silver medal – second place	2011 Catania	Team sabre
Summer Universiade
Bronze medal – third place	1997 Catania	Individual sabre

Dmitry Lapkes (Belarusian: Зьміцер Лапкес, romanized: Dzmitser Lapkes; born 4 June 1976) is a Belarusian sabre fencer, who has competed at four Olympic games. His best result in the Olympic games is finishing 4th in Athens. He won a silver medal in the team sabre event at the 2011 World Fencing Championships. His son, Stanislav, is a goalkeeper for the Columbus Crew.
