= Jason Rogers (fencer) =

American fencer (born 1983)

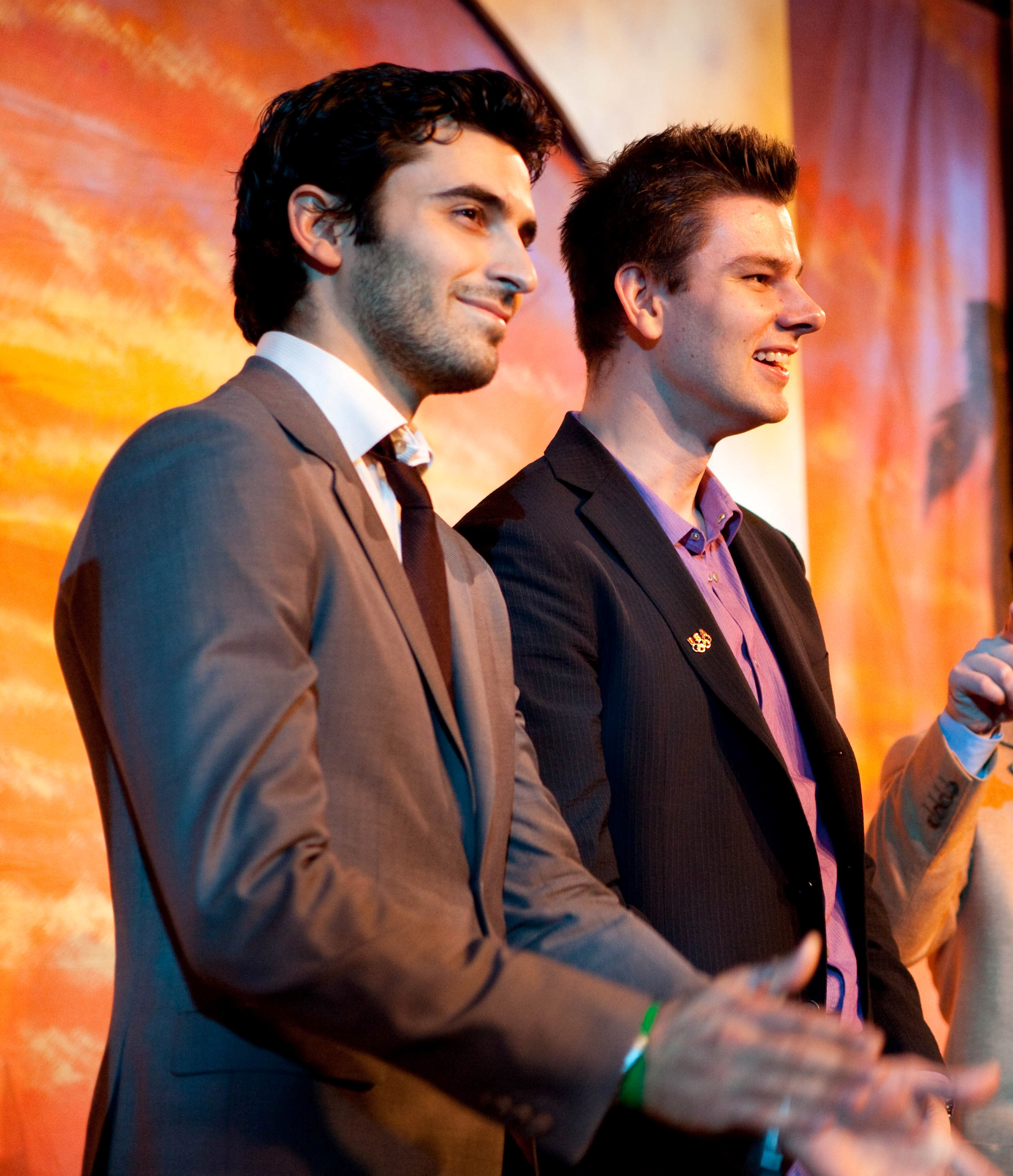
- Rogers (left) with Tim Morehouse in 2009

Personal information
- Born: April 14, 1983 (age 43) Houston, Texas, United States

Sport
- Sport: Fencing
Medal record
Men's fencing
Representing United States
Olympic Games
Silver medal – second place	2008 Beijing	Team sabre
Pan American Games
Bronze medal – third place	2003 Santo Domingo	Individual Sabre

Jason Rogers (born April 14, 1983) is an American saber fencer.

== Fencing career ==
Rogers was born in Houston, Texas. At the urging of his parents, he began to learn fencing at the Westside Fencing Center under the tutelage of his coach, Daniel Costin. He currently fences for the Los Angeles International Fencing Center.

Rogers graduated from Brentwood School (Los Angeles, California) in Los Angeles, California in 2001. He signed with Ohio State University, where he was the NCAA sabre bronze medalist in 2002 and 2003. He graduated summa cum laude with a Bachelor of Science Degree in Psychology ın 2006.

He competed in Athens and fenced in the Beijing Olympics for both the team and individual tournaments in Sabre. In the 2008 Beijing Olympics, he helped the USA sabre team win the quarterfinals against Hungary and semifinals against Russia. His substitute, James Williams, was called into a fence in Roger's place in the gold medal bout.

Some of his career highlights include bronze in the individual saber at the 2003 Pan Am Games and being a member of gold-medal U.S. team as well as winning a bronze medal at the Grand Prix World Cup in Plovdiv, Bulgaria in 2007.

== Awards and honors ==
- 2004, 2008 U.S. Olympic Team Member
- 2008 Grand Prix in Las Vegas, Nev., Sixth Place Team
- 2007 Grand Prix World Cup in Plovdiv, Bulgaria, Bronze Medal
- 2007 U.S. National Championships, Gold Medal Team
- 2004 Grand Prix World Cup in New York, N.Y., Gold Medal Team
- 2003 Pan American Men's Sabre, Bronze Medal
- 2003 Senior "A" World Cup in Madrid, SPA, Eighth Place

== Miscellaneous ==
In 2009, Jason Rogers and Tim Morehouse were on the cover of the New York Post as two of New York City's Most Eligible Bachelors.
