= Julien Pillet =

French fencer (born 1977)

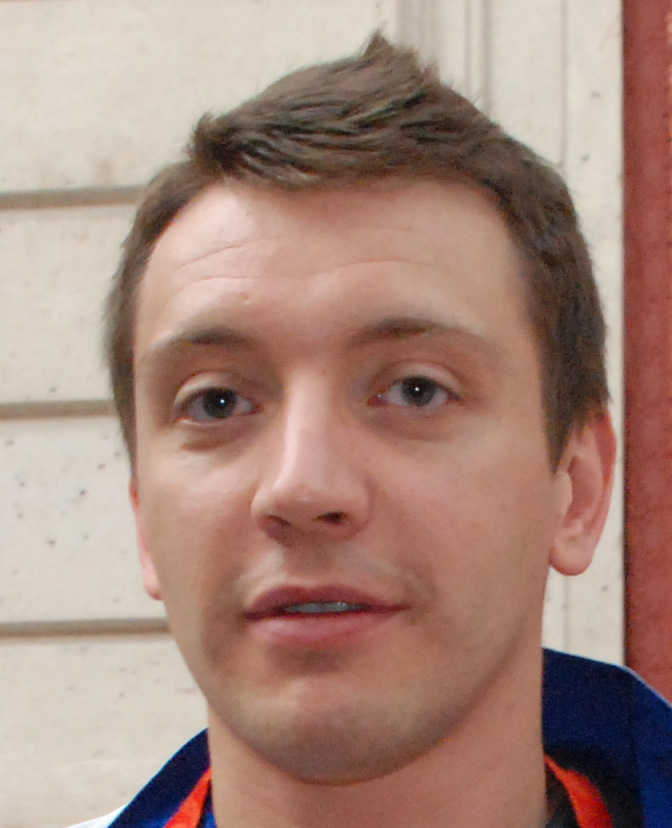
- Julien Pillet

Personal information
- Born: 28 September 1977 (age 48) Dijon, France

Sport
- Sport: Fencing
Medal record
Men's fencing
Representing France
Olympic Games
| Gold medal – first place | 2004 Athens | Team sabre |
| Gold medal – first place | 2008 Beijing | Team sabre |
| Silver medal – second place | 2000 Sydney | Team sabre |

Julien Pillet (born 28 September 1977 in Dijon, Côte-d'Or) is a French sabre fencer. He is a three-time Olympic medalist: he won gold medals in the sabre team events at the 2004 Summer Olympics and 2008 Summer Olympics, and a silver medal in the sabre team event at the 2000 Summer Olympics. He finished 4th in the individual sabre event at the 2008 Beijing Olympics.

Pillet won the individual bronze medal at the 2006 European Seniors Fencing Championship and the gold medal in the sabre team event at the 2006 World Fencing Championships after beating Spain in the final. He accomplished this with his teammates Vincent Anstett, Nicolas Lopez and Boris Sanson.

== Other achievements ==
2000 Sydney Olympics, team sabre
2004 Athens Olympics, team sabre
2005 World Fencing Championships, team sabre
2006 European Seniors Fencing Championship, individual sabre
2006 World Fencing Championships, team sabre
2007 World Fencing Championships, team sabre
2008 Beijing Olympics, team sabre
