= Nicolas Lopez (fencer) =

French fencer

Personal information
- Born: 14 November 1980 (age 45) Tarbes, France
- Height: 1.78 m (5 ft 10 in)
- Weight: 72 kg (159 lb)

Fencing career
- Sport: Fencing
- Weapon: sabre
- Hand: Right-handed
- National coach: Jean-Philippe Daurelle
- Club: Amicale tarbaise
- Former coach: René Geuna
- Retired: 2012
- FIE ranking: current ranking
Medal record
Men's sabre
Representing France
Olympic Games
| Gold medal – first place | 2008 Beijing | Team sabre |
| Silver medal – second place | 2008 Beijing | Sabre |
World Championships
| Gold medal – first place | 2006 Turin | Team sabre |
| Silver medal – second place | 2007 St Petersburg | Team sabre |
| Bronze medal – third place | 2005 Leipzig | Team sabre |
European Championships
| Silver medal – second place | 2002 Koblenz | Team sabre |
| Bronze medal – third place | 2005 Zalaegerszeg | Sabre |
| Bronze medal – third place | 2007 Ghent | Team sabre |
| Bronze medal – third place | 2009 Plovdiv | Team sabre |

Nicolas Lopez (born 14 November 1980 in Tarbes) is a French sabre fencer.

Lopez won the gold medal in the sabre team event at the 2006 World Fencing Championships after beating Ukraine in the final. He accomplished this with his teammates Vincent Anstett, Julien Pillet and Boris Sanson.

At the 2008 Beijing Olympics he helped his team win a gold medal in fencing, after beating the United States in the final. Lopez also won the silver medal in the individual sabre fencing, losing to Zhong Man in the final.

== Achievements ==
2005 World Fencing Championships, team sabre
2006 World Fencing Championships, team sabre
2007 World Fencing Championships, team sabre
2008 Beijing Olympics, team sabre
2008 Beijing Olympics, individual sabre
