= Jorge Pina (fencer) =

Spanish fencer

Personal information
- Born: Jorge Pina Pérez; 26 January 1977 (age 49) Madrid, Spain

Sport
- Sport: Fencing
Medal record
Representing Spain
Summer Universiade
Silver medal – second place	1999 Palma de Mallorca	Team sabre
Bronze medal – third place	1999 Palma de Mallorca	Individual sabre
Bronze medal – third place	2001 Beijing	Team sabre
Bronze medal – third place	2003 Daegu	Team sabre
Mediterranean Games
Bronze medal – third place	2005 Almeria	Individual sabre

Jorge Pina Pérez (born 26 January 1977) is a Spanish sabre fencer and a two-time Olympic fencer. He seeded 7th in the individual competition at the 2008 Summer Olympics. He won a bronze medal at the 2005 Mediterranean Games.
