= Mamadou Keita (fencer) =

Senegalese fencer

Personal information
- Nationality: Senegalese

Fencing career
- Sport: Fencing
- Weapon: Sabre
- Club: Tim Morehouse Fencing Club

Mamadou Keita is a sabre fencer from Senegal.

He participated in the 2008 Summer Olympics. He won in the table of 64 match versus Satoshi Ogawa (15–14), then lost in the round of 32 versus Rareș Dumitrescu (7–15). He seeded 29th overall.
