= Fencing at the 2004 Summer Olympics – Men's team sabre =

Men's team sabre at the Games of the XXVIII Olympiad
- Venue: Helliniko Olympic Complex
- Date: August 19, 2004

Medalists
1st place, gold medalist(s)		Julien Pillet; Damien Touya; Gael Touya	France
2nd place, silver medalist(s)		Aldo Montano; Gianpiero Pastore; Luigi Tarantino	Italy
3rd place, bronze medalist(s)		Sergey Sharikov; Aleksey Dyachenko; Stanislav Pozdnyakov; Aleksey Yakimenko	Russia

These are the results of the men's sabre team competition in fencing at the 2004 Summer Olympics in Athens. A total of 31 men from nine nations competed in this event. Competition took place in the Fencing Hall at the Helliniko Olympic Complex on August 19.

For the first time since 1988, a non-Russian team won gold in the event.

== Tournament results ==
The team competition was a single-elimination tournament among eight teams. Quarterfinal losers continued to play classification matches to determine final placement from first to eighth. Each team match consisted of a set of nine individual matches, comprising a full round-robin schedule among the three fencers on each team.

=== Brackets ===
Quarterfinals
11:15
France	45
China	35
11:15
United States	45
Hungary	43
11:15
Italy	45
Ukraine	44
11:15
Russia	45
Greece	22

Semifinals
12:30
France	45
United States	44
12:30
Italy	45
Russia	42

Gold medal final
19:40
France	45
Italy	42
Bronze medal final
18:30
Russia	45
United States	44

Classification matches
12:30
Hungary	45
China	40
12:30
Ukraine	45
Greece	39

Fifth place match
13:40
Hungary	45
Ukraine	40
Seventh place match
13:40
China	45
Greece	42

=== Preliminary match ===
As there were nine teams in the competition, one preliminary match was held to reduce the field to eight teams. The losing team, Algeria, therefore had a final classification of ninth place in the tournament.

Greece	45 – 25	Algeria
Marios Basmatzian	5 – 2	Raouf Salim Bernaoui
Constantine Manetas	5 – 2	Nassim Islam Bernaoui
Jason Dourakos	5 – 2	Reda Benchehima
Marios Basmatzian	5 – 2	Nassim Islam Bernaoui
Jason Dourakos	5 – 2	Raouf Salim Bernaoui
Constantine Manetas	5 – 4	Reda Benchehima
Jason Dourakos	5 – 3	Nassim Islam Bernaoui
Marios Basmatzian	5 – 3	Reda Benchehima
Constantine Manetas	5 – 5	Raouf Salim Bernaoui

=== Quarterfinals ===
France	45 – 35	China
Damien Touya	5 – 3	Zhou Hanming
Gaël Touya	3 – 7	Chen Feng
Julien Pillet	4 – 5	Huang Yaojiang
Gaël Touya	7 – 5	Zhou Hanming
Damien Touya	3 – 5	Huang Yaojiang
Julien Pillet	8 – 4	Chen Feng
Gaël Touya	5 – 2	Huang Yaojiang
Julien Pillet	5 – 2	Zhou Hanming
Damien Touya	5 – 2	Chen Feng

United States	45 – 43	Hungary
Ivan Lee	3 – 5	Domonkos Ferjancsik
Keeth Smart	7 – 3	Balázs Lengyel
Jason Rogers	2 – 7	Zsolt Nemcsik
Ivan Lee	8 – 3	Balázs Lengyel
Jason Rogers	4 – 7	Domonkos Ferjancsik
Keeth Smart	1 – 5	Zsolt Nemcsik
Jason Rogers	7 – 5	Balázs Lengyel
Ivan Lee	6 – 5	Zsolt Nemcsik
Keeth Smart	7 – 3	Domonkos Ferjancsik

Italy	45 – 44	Ukraine
Luigi Tarantino	5 – 1	Vladyslav Tretiak
Giampiero Pastore	5 – 8	Volodymyr Kaliuzhniy
Aldo Montano	5 – 4	Volodymyr Lukashenko
Giampiero Pastore	5 – 5	Vladyslav Tretiak
Luigi Tarantino	5 – 3	Volodymyr Lukashenko
Aldo Montano	5 – 3	Volodymyr Kaliuzhniy
Giampiero Pastore	5 – 9	Volodymyr Lukashenko
Aldo Montano	5 – 6	Vladyslav Tretiak
Luigi Tarantino	5 – 5	Volodymyr Kaliuzhniy

Russia	45 – 22	Greece
Sergey Sharikov	4 – 5	Constantine Manetas
Stanislav Pozdnyakov	6 – 3	Jason Dourakos
Aleksey Dyachenko	5 – 3	Marios Basmatzian
Sergey Sharikov	5 – 4	Jason Dourakos
Aleksey Dyachenko	5 – 0	Constantine Manetas
Stanislav Pozdnyakov	5 – 0	Marios Basmatzian
Aleksey Dyachenko	5 – 3	Jason Dourakos
Sergey Sharikov	5 – 2	Marios Basmatzian
Stanislav Pozdnyakov	5 – 3	Constantine Manetas

=== Semifinals ===
France	45 – 44	United States
Damien Touya	3 – 5	Ivan Lee
Gael Touya	7 – 3	Keeth Smart
Julien Pillet	4 – 7	Jason Rogers
Gael Touya	6 – 2	Ivan Lee
Damien Touya	5 – 4	Jason Rogers
Julien Pillet	5 – 8	Keeth Smart
Gael Touya	5 – 3	Jason Rogers
Julien Pillet	5 – 6	Ivan Lee
Damien Touya	5 – 6	Keeth Smart

Italy	45 – 42	Russia
Luigi Tarantino	4 – 5	Sergey Sharikov
Giampiero Pastore	3 – 5	Stanislav Pozdnyakov
Aldo Montano	4 – 5	Aleksey Yakimenko
Giampiero Pastore	4 – 5	Sergey Sharikov
Luigi Tarantino	8 – 5	Aleksey Yakimenko
Aldo Montano	7 – 4	Stanislav Pozdnyakov
Giampiero Pastore	4 – 6	Aleksey Yakimenko
Aldo Montano	5 – 5	Sergey Sharikov
Luigi Tarantino	6 – 2	Stanislav Pozdnyakov

=== Classification matches ===
Hungary	45 – 40	China
Zsolt Nemcsik	5 – 0	Wang Jingzhi
Kende Fodor	5 – 3	Huang Yaojiang
Domonkos Ferjancsik	4 – 12	Chen Feng
Kende Fodor	4 – 5	Wang Jingzhi
Zsolt Nemcsik	7 – 3	Chen Feng
Domonkos Ferjancsik	5 – 6	Huang Yaojiang
Kende Fodor	5 – 2	Chen Feng
Domonkos Ferjancsik	5 – 3	Wang Jingzhi
Zsolt Nemcsik	5 – 6	Huang Yaojiang

Ukraine	45 – 39	Greece
Volodymyr Lukashenko	4 – 5	Constantine Manetas
Oleh Shturbabin	0 – 5	Jason Dourakos
Volodymyr Kaliuzhniy	5 – 3	Marios Basmatzian
Volodymyr Lukashenko	5 – 4	Jason Dourakos
Volodymyr Kaliuzhniy	5 – 2	Constantine Manetas
Oleh Shturbabin	5 – 4	Marios Basmatzian
Volodymyr Kaliuzhniy	5 – 5	Jason Dourakos
Volodymyr Lukashenko	5 – 5	Marios Basmatzian
Oleh Shturbabin	5 – 10	Constantine Manetas

=== Seventh place match ===
China	45 – 42	Greece
Wang Jingzhi	2 – 5	Constantine Manetas
Huang Yaojiang	5 – 5	Dimitris Costakos
Chen Feng	8 – 4	Marios Basmatzian
Wang Jingzhi	3 – 6	Dimitris Costakos
Chen Feng	3 – 5	Constantine Manetas
Huang Yaojiang	9 – 4	Marios Basmatzian
Chen Feng	3 – 6	Dimitris Costakos
Wang Jingzhi	5 – 5	Marios Basmatzian
Huang Yaojiang	7 – 2	Constantine Manetas

=== Fifth place match ===
Hungary	45 – 40	Ukraine
Zsolt Nemcsik	5 – 4	Oleh Shturbabin
Kende Fodor	5 – 5	Volodymyr Kaliuzhniy
Domonkos Ferjancsik	5 – 3	Volodymyr Lukashenko
Kende Fodor	5 – 6	Oleh Shturbabin
Zsolt Nemcsik	5 – 4	Volodymyr Lukashenko
Domonkos Ferjancsik	5 – 6	Volodymyr Kaliuzhniy
Kende Fodor	5 – 6	Volodymyr Lukashenko
Domonkos Ferjancsik	5 – 4	Oleh Shturbabin
Zsolt Nemcsik	5 – 2	Volodymyr Kaliuzhniy

=== Bronze medal match ===
Russia	45 – 44	United States
Sergey Sharikov	3 – 5	Keeth Smart
Stanislav Pozdnyakov	7 – 1	Jason Rogers
Aleksey Yakimenko	5 – 4	Ivan Lee
Sergey Sharikov	4 – 10	Jason Rogers
Aleksey Yakimenko	5 – 5	Keeth Smart
Stanislav Pozdnyakov	5 – 5	Ivan Lee
Aleksey Yakimenko	4 – 5	Jason Rogers
Sergey Sharikov	2 – 5	Ivan Lee
Stanislav Pozdnyakov	10 – 4	Keeth Smart

=== Gold medal match ===
France	45 – 42	Italy
Julien Pillet	4 – 5	Luigi Tarantino
Damien Touya	3 – 5	Giampiero Pastore
Gaël Touya	6 – 5	Aldo Montano
Julien Pillet	7 – 2	Giampiero Pastore
Gaël Touya	5 – 1	Luigi Tarantino
Damien Touya	5 – 11	Aldo Montano
Gaël Touya	5 – 4	Giampiero Pastore
Julien Pillet	4 – 7	Aldo Montano
Damien Touya	6 – 2	Luigi Tarantino
