= Hungary at the 2004 Summer Olympics =

- IOC code: HUN
- NOC: Hungarian Olympic Committee
- Website: www.olimpia.hu (in Hungarian and English)

in Athens
- Competitors: 209 in 20 sports
- Flag bearer: Antal Kovács
- Medals Ranked 12th: Gold 8 Silver 6 Bronze 3 Total 17

Summer Olympics appearances (overview)
- 1896; 1900; 1904; 1908; 1912; 1920; 1924; 1928; 1932; 1936; 1948; 1952; 1956; 1960; 1964; 1968; 1972; 1976; 1980; 1984; 1988; 1992; 1996; 2000; 2004; 2008; 2012; 2016; 2020; 2024; 2028

Other related appearances
- 1906 Intercalated Games

Hungary competed at the 2004 Summer Olympics in Athens, Greece, from 13 to 29 August 2004. Hungarian athletes have competed at every Summer Olympic Games in the modern era, except the 1920 Summer Olympics in Antwerp, and the 1984 Summer Olympics in Los Angeles because of the Soviet boycott. The Hungarian Olympic Committee (Hungarian: Magyar Olimpiai Bizottság, MOB) sent a total of 209 athletes to the Games, 119 men and 90 women, to compete in 20 sports. Water polo and handball were the only team-based sports in which Hungary had its representation in these Olympic Games. There was only a single competitor in road cycling and mountain biking.

The Hungarian team featured several Olympic medalists from Sydney, including the men's water polo team (led by Tibor Benedek), épée fencer Tímea Nagy, sprint kayakers Zoltán Kammerer, György Kolonics (who later died in 2008 due to heart failure), and Katalin Kovács, and breaststroke and medley swimmer Ágnes Kovács. Table tennis player Csilla Bátorfi became the first female Hungarian athlete to compete in five Olympic Games as one of the most sophisticated members of the team. Along with Kolonics and Benedek, six Hungarian athletes had made their fourth Olympic appearance, including fencer Iván Kovács and half-heavyweight judoka Antal Kovács, who was assigned by the committee to become the nation's flag bearer in the opening ceremony. Race walker Zoltán Czukor, aged 41, was the oldest member of the team, while backstroke swimmer Evelyn Verrasztó was the youngest at age 15.

Hungary left Athens with a total of 17 Olympic medals, 8 golds, 6 silver, and 3 bronze, matching its overall tally with Sydney four years earlier. Almost a third of these medals were awarded to the athletes in sprint canoeing, three in fencing, and two in swimming. Skeet shooter Diána Igaly and modern pentathlete Zsuzsanna Vörös won Olympic gold medals for the first time in their respective sporting events by a female. Meanwhile, Nagy managed to repeat her gold from Sydney in women's épée fencing. Hungary's team-based athletes proved particularly successful in Athens, as the men's water polo team had fulfilled a mission to defend their eighth overall Olympic title.

Originally, Hungary had won 20 Olympic medals at these Games. Three Hungarian medalists had been disqualified from the Games for committing an anti-doping violation, two of which were Olympic champions in track and field. On August 25, 2004, discus thrower Róbert Fazekas failed to submit a proper urine sample during the test, and was not allowed to present his gold in the medal ceremony. At the conclusion of the Games, the International Olympic Committee decided to strip off Adrián Annus' gold medal in men's hammer throw for failing to show up in the doping test.

== Medalists ==
Medal	Name	Sport	Event	Date
Gold	Tímea Nagy	Fencing	Women's épée	15 August
Gold	Diána Igaly	Shooting	Women's skeet	19 August
Gold	István Majoros	Wrestling	Men's Greco-Roman 55 kg	25 August
Gold	Gábor Horváth; Zoltán Kammerer; Botond Storcz; Ákos Vereckei	Canoeing	Men's K-4 1000 m	27 August
Gold	Zsuzsanna Vörös	Modern pentathlon	Women's event	27 August
Gold	Natasa Janics	Canoeing	Women's K-1 500 m	28 August
Gold	Katalin Kovács; Natasa Janics	Canoeing	Women's K-2 500 m	28 August
Gold	Hungary men's national water polo team: Zoltán Szécsi; Tamás Varga; Norbert Madaras; Ádám Steinmetz; Tamás Kásás; Attila Vári; Gergely Kiss; Tibor Benedek; Rajmund Fodor; István Gergely; Barnabás Steinmetz; Tamás Molnár; Péter Biros	Water polo	Men's tournament	29 August
Silver	Zsolt Nemcsik	Fencing	Men's sabre	14 August
Silver	Dániel Gyurta	Swimming	Men's 200 m breaststroke	18 August
Silver	Eszter Krutzler	Weightlifting	Women's 69 kg	19 August
Silver	Gábor Boczkó; Iván Kovács; Krisztián Kulcsár; Géza Imre	Fencing	Men's team épée	22 August
Silver	Zoltán Kővágó	Athletics	Men's discus throw	23 August
Silver	Kinga Bóta; Katalin Kovács; Szilvia Szabó; Erzsébet Viski	Canoeing	Women's K-4 500 m	27 August
Bronze	László Cseh	Swimming	Men's 400 m individual medley	14 August
Bronze	Attila Vajda	Canoeing	Men's C-1 1000 m	27 August
Bronze	György Kolonics; György Kozmann	Canoeing	Men's C-2 1000 m	27 August

Medals by sport
Sport	1st place, gold medalist(s)	2nd place, silver medalist(s)	3rd place, bronze medalist(s)	Total
Canoeing	3	1	2	6
Fencing	1	2	0	3
Modern pentathlon	1	0	0	1
Shooting	1	0	0	1
Water polo	1	0	0	1
Wrestling	1	0	0	1
Swimming	0	1	1	2
Athletics	0	1	0	1
Weightlifting	0	1	0	1
Total	8	6	3	17

== Athletics ==
Hungarian athletes have so far achieved qualifying standards in the following athletics events (up to a maximum of 3 athletes in each event at the 'A' Standard, and 1 at the 'B' Standard).

Róbert Fazekas and Adrián Annus originally claimed gold medals in both men's discus and hammer throw. On August 25, 2004, a few hours before the medal ceremony had taken place, Fazekas committed an anti-doping violation by failing to submit a proper urine sample during the test, and was eventually expelled from the Games. Meanwhile, at the conclusion of the Games, the International Olympic Committee stripped off Annus' Olympic title after failing the doping test.

Key

- Note–Ranks given for track events are within the athlete's heat only
- Q = Qualified for the next round
- q = Qualified for the next round as a fastest loser or, in field events, by position without achieving the qualifying target
- NR = National record
- N/A = Round not applicable for the event
- Bye = Athlete not required to compete in round

Men
Track & road events

Athlete	Event	Heat		Quarterfinal		Semifinal		Final	
Athlete	Event	Result	Rank	Result	Rank	Result	Rank	Result	Rank
Zsolt Bácskai	Marathon	—N/a						DNF	
Levente Csillag	110 m hurdles	13.74	7	Did not advance					
Zoltán Czukor	50 km walk	—N/a						4:03:51	24
Gábor Dobos	100 m	10.68	6	Did not advance					
Gyula Dudás	20 km walk	—N/a						1:28:18	30
Roland Németh	100 m	10.28	3 Q	10.38	6	Did not advance			
Géza Pauer	200 m	21.02	4 Q	20.90	6	Did not advance			
Zsolt Szeglet	400 m	46.16	4	—N/a		Did not advance			
János Tóth	50 km walk	—N/a						4:29:33	41

Field events

Athlete	Event	Qualification		Final	
Athlete	Event	Distance	Position	Distance	Position
Adrián Annus	Hammer throw	79.59	3 Q	~~83.19~~	DSQ
Zsolt Bíber	Shot put	19.31	24	Did not advance	
László Boros	High jump	2.15	33	Did not advance	
Róbert Fazekas	Discus throw	68.10	1 Q	~~70.93~~	DSQ
Gergely Horváth	Javelin throw	73.95	26	Did not advance	
Zoltán Kővágó	Discus throw	61.91	11 q	67.04	2nd place, silver medalist(s)
Tamás Margl	Long jump	7.38	38	Did not advance	
Gábor Máté	Discus throw	63.41	5 q	57.84	11
Krisztián Pars	Hammer throw	80.50	2 Q	78.73	5
Péter Tölgyesi	Triple jump	16.36	26	Did not advance	

Combined events – Decathlon

Athlete	Event	100 m	LJ	SP	HJ	400 m	110H	DT	PV	JT	1500 m	Final	Rank
Attila Zsivoczky	Result	10.91	7.14	15.31	2.12	49.40	14.95	45.62	4.70	63.45	4:29.54	8287	6
Attila Zsivoczky	Points	881	847	809	915	842	856	780	819	790	748	8287	6

Women
Track & road events

Athlete	Event	Heat		Semifinal		Final	
Athlete	Event	Result	Rank	Result	Rank	Result	Rank
Edina Füsti	20 km walk	—N/a				1:39:45	44
Anikó Kálovics	10000 m	—N/a				32:21.47	20
Ida Kovács	Marathon	—N/a				3:03:21	60
Krisztina Papp	5000 m	15:58.44	17	—N/a		Did not advance	
Judit Varga	1500 m	4:09.36	12	Did not advance			
Beáta Rakonczai	Marathon	—N/a				2:49:41	48
Simona Staicu	Marathon	—N/a				2:48:57	45

Field events

Athlete	Event	Qualification		Final	
Athlete	Event	Distance	Position	Distance	Position
Zita Ajkler	Long jump	6.39	26	Did not advance	
Katalin Divós	Hammer throw	67.64	17	Did not advance	
Éva Kürti	Shot put	14.60	36	Did not advance	
Éva Kürti	Discus throw	52.52	39	Did not advance	
Krisztina Molnár	Pole vault	4.30	=19	Did not advance	
Éva Orbán	Hammer throw	65.76	24	Did not advance	
Nikolett Szabó	Javelin throw	60.20	16	Did not advance	
Julianna Tudja	Hammer throw	66.85	18	Did not advance	
Tünde Vaszi	Long jump	6.55	12 q	6.73	7

== Boxing ==
Hungary sent five boxers to Athens. In the first round, two were defeated while two advanced by winning and a third received a bye. All three that advanced lost in the round of 16.

Athlete	Event	Round of 32	Round of 16	Quarterfinals	Semifinals	Final	
Athlete	Event	Opposition Result	Opposition Result	Opposition Result	Opposition Result	Opposition Result	Rank
Pál Bedák	Light flyweight	Abiyev (AZE); L 8–23	Did not advance				
Zsolt Bedák	Bantamweight	Mares (MEX); W 36–27	Tretyak (UKR); L 24–27	Did not advance			
Gyula Káté	Lightweight	Baik J-S (KOR); L 23–30	Did not advance				
Vilmos Balog	Welterweight	Bye	Novoa (COL); L 24–33	Did not advance			
Károly Balzsay	Middleweight	Sahraoui (TUN); W 29–24	Despaigne (CUB); L 25–38	Did not advance			

== Canoeing ==
=== Sprint ===
Men

Athlete	Event	Heats		Semifinals		Final	
Athlete	Event	Time	Rank	Time	Rank	Time	Rank
Márton Joób	C-1 500 m	1:51.025	4 q	1:50.813	2 Q	1:48.195	7
Roland Kökény	K-1 1000 m	3:27.904	2 q	3:29.134	2 Q	3:31.121	6
Attila Vajda	C-1 1000 m	3:57.290	4 q	3:52.236	2 Q	3:49.025	3rd place, bronze medalist(s)
Ákos Vereckei	K-1 500 m	1:37.589	2 q	1:38.737	2 Q	1:39.315	5
István Beé; Zoltán Benkő	K-2 1000 m	3:13.340	5 q	3:13.609	3 Q	3:27.996	9
Zoltán Kammerer; Botond Storcz	K-2 500 m	1:31.166	4 q	1:30.438	1 Q	1:29.096	5
György Kolonics; György Kozmann	C-2 500 m	1:41.324	4 q	1:41.472	2 Q	1:41.138	7
György Kolonics; György Kozmann	C-2 1000 m	3:31.775	3 Q	Bye		3:43.106	3rd place, bronze medalist(s)
Gábor Horváth; Zoltán Kammerer; Botond Storcz; Ákos Vereckei	K-4 1000 m	2:51.010	1 Q	Bye		2:56.919	1st place, gold medalist(s)

Women

Athlete	Event	Heats		Semifinals		Final	
Athlete	Event	Time	Rank	Time	Rank	Time	Rank
Nataša Dušev-Janić	K-1 500 m	1:49.870	1 Q	Bye		1:47.741	1st place, gold medalist(s)
Nataša Dušev-Janić; Katalin Kovács	K-2 500 m	1:38.606	1 Q	Bye		1:38.101	1st place, gold medalist(s)
Kinga Bóta; Katalin Kovács; Szilvia Szabó; Erzsébet Viski	K-4 500 m	1:32.298	2 Q	Bye		1:34.536	2nd place, silver medalist(s)

Qualification Legend: Q = Qualify to final; q = Qualify to semifinal

== Cycling ==
=== Road ===
Athlete	Event	Time	Rank
László Bodrogi	Men's road race	5:56:45	74
László Bodrogi	Men's time trial	1:00:38.05	20

=== Mountain biking ===
Athlete	Event	Time	Rank
Zsolt Vinczeffy	Men's cross-country	LAP (2 laps)	43

== Diving ==
Hungarian divers qualified for three individual spots at the 2004 Olympic Games.

Men

Athlete	Event	Preliminaries		Semifinals		Final	
Athlete	Event	Points	Rank	Points	Rank	Points	Rank
András Hajnal	10 m platform	305.79	33	Did not advance			

Women

Athlete	Event	Preliminaries		Semifinals		Final	
Athlete	Event	Points	Rank	Points	Rank	Points	Rank
Nóra Barta	3 m springboard	279.24	15 Q	491.52	14	Did not advance	
Villő Kormos	3 m springboard	193.68	32	Did not advance			

== Fencing ==
Men

Athlete	Event	Round of 64	Round of 32	Round of 16	Quarterfinal	Semifinal	Final / BM	
Athlete	Event	Opposition Score	Opposition Score	Opposition Score	Opposition Score	Opposition Score	Opposition Score	Rank
Gábor Boczkó	Individual épée	Bye	Wang L (CHN); L 10–15	Did not advance				
Géza Imre	Individual épée	Bye	Strigel (GER); L 13–15	Did not advance				
Iván Kovács	Individual épée	Bye	Mattern (USA); W 15–6	Fischer (SUI); L 7–15	Did not advance			
Gábor Boczkó; Géza Imre; Iván Kovács; Krisztián Kulcsár	Team épée	—N/a			Ukraine; W 38–34	Russia; W 34–26	France; L 32–43	2nd place, silver medalist(s)
Domonkos Ferjancsik	Individual sabre	Bye	Boulos (CAN); W 15–8	Nemcsik (HUN); L 11–15	Did not advance			
Balázs Lengyel	Individual sabre	Bye	Tretiak (UKR); L 12–15	Did not advance				
Zsolt Nemcsik	Individual sabre	Bye	Huang Yj (CHN); W 15–12	Ferjancsik (HUN); W 15–11	Covaliu (ROM); W 15–14	Tretiak (UKR); W 15–11	Montano (ITA); L 14–15	2nd place, silver medalist(s)
Domonkos Ferjancsik; Kende Fodor; Balázs Lengyel; Zsolt Nemcsik	Team sabre	—N/a			United States; L 43–45	Classification semi-final China; W 45–40	5th place final Ukraine; W 45–40	5

Women

Athlete	Event	Round of 64	Round of 32	Round of 16	Quarterfinal	Semifinal	Final / BM	
Athlete	Event	Opposition Score	Opposition Score	Opposition Score	Opposition Score	Opposition Score	Opposition Score	Rank
Adrienn Hormay	Individual épée	Bye	Brânză (ROM); L 13–15	Did not advance				
Ildikó Mincza-Nébald	Individual épée	Bye	Tol (NED); W 15–7	Heidemann (GER); W 11–10	Kim H-J (KOR); W 15–9	Flessel-Colovic (FRA); L 14–15	Nisima (FRA); L 12–15	4
Tímea Nagy	Individual épée	Bye	Sivkova (RUS); W 15–10	Cascioli (ITA); W 15–13	Zhang L (CHN); W 8–7	Nisima (FRA); W 15–14	Flessel-Colovic (FRA); W 15–10	1st place, gold medalist(s)
Adrienn Hormay; Ildikó Mincza-Nébald; Tímea Nagy; Hajnalka Tóth	Team épée	—N/a			Canada; L 37–38	Classification semi-final South Korea; W 40–33	5th place final China; W 32–31	5
Aida Mohamed	Individual foil	—N/a	Bye	Yusheva (RUS); W 14–9	Nam H-H (KOR); W 15–5	Trillini (ITA); L 7–15	Gruchała (POL); L 9–15	4
Gabriella Varga	Individual foil	—N/a	Chan Y M (HKG); W 15–3	Boyko (RUS); W 15–9	Trillini (ITA); L 11–15	Did not advance		
Orsolya Nagy	Individual sabre	—N/a	Hisagae (JPN); L 14–15	Did not advance				

== Gymnastics ==
=== Artistic ===
Men

Athlete	Event	Qualification								Final							
Athlete	Event	Apparatus						Total	Rank	Apparatus						Total	Rank
Athlete	Event	F	PH	R	V	PB	HB	Total	Rank	F	PH	R	V	PB	HB	Total	Rank
Róbert Gál	Floor	9.587	—N/a					9.587	24	Did not advance							
Róbert Gál	Vault	—N/a			9.550	—N/a		9.550	6 Q	—N/a			9.537	—N/a		9.537	6

Women

Athlete	Event	Qualification						Final					
Athlete	Event	Apparatus				Total	Rank	Apparatus				Total	Rank
Athlete	Event	V	UB	BB	F	Total	Rank	V	UB	BB	F	Total	Rank
Krisztina Szarka	All-around	8.712	7.012	8.150	7.787	31.661	63	Did not advance					

== Handball ==
=== Men's tournament ===
Roster

The following is the Hungary roster in the men's handball tournament of the 2004 Summer Olympics.

Head coaches: László Skaliczky

No.	Pos.	Name	Date of birth (age)	Height	App.	Goals	Club
1	GK	János Szathmári	25 March 1969 (aged 35)	1.85 m			(Hungary) Tatabánya-Carbonex KC
2	RW	Gergely Harsányi	3 May 1981 (aged 23)	1.91 m			(Hungary) PLER KC
3	LB	Ferenc Ilyés	20 December 1981 (aged 22)	1.98 m			(Hungary) SC Pick Szeged
4	CB	Gábor Császár	16 June 1984 (aged 20)	1.87 m			(Hungary) Dunaferr SE
5	P	Richárd Mezei	23 October 1970 (aged 33)	1.98 m			(Hungary) SC Pick Szeged
6	RB	Tamás Mocsai	9 December 1978 (aged 25)	1.96 m			(Switzerland) Pfadi Winterthur
7	P	Gyula Gál	18 August 1976 (aged 27)	1.93 m			(Hungary) Fotex KC Veszprém
8	LW	Gergő Iváncsik	30 November 1981 (aged 22)	1.90 m			(Hungary) Fotex KC Veszprém
12	GK	Nándor Fazekas	16 October 1976 (aged 27)	1.92 m			(Germany) TuS N-Lübbecke
13	CB	Ivo Díaz	10 May 1972 (aged 32)	1.90 m			(Hungary) Fotex KC Veszprém
14	LB	Carlos Pérez	26 August 1971 (aged 32)	1.97 m			(Hungary) Fotex KC Veszprém
15	LW	István Pásztor	5 June 1971 (aged 33)	1.92 m			(Hungary) Fotex KC Veszprém
17	RB	Balázs Laluska	20 June 1981 (aged 23)	2.02 m			(Hungary) SC Pick Szeged
19	RB	László Nagy	3 March 1981 (aged 23)	2.08 m			(Spain) FC Barcelona
24	CB	Péter Lendvay	15 September 1976 (aged 27)	1.92 m			(Spain) SD Octavio Vigo

Group play

Pos	Team	Pld	W	D	L	GF	GA	GD	Pts	Qualification
1	France	5	5	0	0	135	108	+27	10	Quarterfinals
2	Hungary	5	4	0	1	132	124	+8	8	Quarterfinals
3	Germany	5	3	0	2	139	110	+29	6	Quarterfinals
4	Greece (H)	5	2	0	3	117	130	−13	4	Quarterfinals
5	Brazil	5	1	0	4	105	133	−28	2	
6	Egypt	5	0	0	5	110	133	−23	0	

Rules for classification: 1) Points; 2) Head-to-head points; 3) Head-to-head goal difference; 4) Head-to-head goals scored; 5) Goal difference; 6) Goals scored; 7) Draw.
(H) Hosts

14 August 2004; 11:30	Hungary	33 - 28	Egypt	Sports Pavilion, Athens; Referees: Boye, Jensen (DEN)
14 August 2004; 11:30	Pasztor 9	(16-15)	Zaky 10	Sports Pavilion, Athens; Referees: Boye, Jensen (DEN)
14 August 2004; 11:30	3× (yellow card) 8× (suspension)		3× (yellow card) 3× (suspension)	Sports Pavilion, Athens; Referees: Boye, Jensen (DEN)

16 August 2004; 19:30	Brazil	19 - 20	Hungary	Sports Pavilion, Athens; Referees: Nachevski, Nachevski (MKD)
16 August 2004; 19:30	Souza 5	(10-10)	4 players with 3	Sports Pavilion, Athens; Referees: Nachevski, Nachevski (MKD)
16 August 2004; 19:30	3× (yellow card) 4× (suspension)		3× (yellow card) 4× (suspension)	Sports Pavilion, Athens; Referees: Nachevski, Nachevski (MKD)

18 August 2004; 14:30	France	26 - 23	Hungary	Sports Pavilion, Athens; Referees: Hansson, Olsson (SWE)
18 August 2004; 14:30	Guigou 6	(9-10)	Pérez 10	Sports Pavilion, Athens; Referees: Hansson, Olsson (SWE)
18 August 2004; 14:30	4× (yellow card) 9× (suspension)		3× (yellow card) 4× (suspension)	Sports Pavilion, Athens; Referees: Hansson, Olsson (SWE)

20 August 2004; 16:30	Hungary	30 – 29	Germany	Sports Pavilion, Athens; Referees: Boye, Jensen (DEN)
20 August 2004; 16:30	Nagy 11	(17-14)	Kretzschmar 8	Sports Pavilion, Athens; Referees: Boye, Jensen (DEN)
20 August 2004; 16:30	3× (yellow card) 4× (suspension)		3× (yellow card) 6× (suspension)	Sports Pavilion, Athens; Referees: Boye, Jensen (DEN)

22 August 2004; 14:30	Hungary	26 - 22	Greece	Sports Pavilion, Athens; Referees: Pozeznik, Repensek (SLO)
22 August 2004; 14:30	Pérez 7	(12-12)	Voglis 7	Sports Pavilion, Athens; Referees: Pozeznik, Repensek (SLO)
22 August 2004; 14:30	3× (yellow card) 1× (suspension)		2× (yellow card) 1× (suspension)	Sports Pavilion, Athens; Referees: Pozeznik, Repensek (SLO)

Quarterfinal

24 August 2004; 14:30	South Korea	25 - 30	Hungary	Sports Pavilion, Athens; Referees: Baum, Goralczyk (POL)
24 August 2004; 14:30	Yoon K 7	(13-14)	Nagy 9	Sports Pavilion, Athens; Referees: Baum, Goralczyk (POL)
24 August 2004; 14:30	3× (yellow card) 2× (suspension)		3× (yellow card) 5× (suspension)	Sports Pavilion, Athens; Referees: Baum, Goralczyk (POL)

Semifinal

27 August 2004; 14:30	Croatia	33 - 31	Hungary	Helliniko Olympic Indoor Arena; Referees: Arnaldsson, Vidarsson (ISL)
27 August 2004; 14:30	Balić 9	(18-16)	Pérez 8	Helliniko Olympic Indoor Arena; Referees: Arnaldsson, Vidarsson (ISL)
27 August 2004; 14:30	3× (yellow card) 3× (suspension)		3× (yellow card) 2× (suspension)	Helliniko Olympic Indoor Arena; Referees: Arnaldsson, Vidarsson (ISL)

Bronze Medal Final

28 August 2004; 21:30	Hungary	26 - 28	Russia	Helliniko Olympic Indoor Arena; Referees: Bavas, Migas (GRE)
28 August 2004; 21:30	Pérez 10	(10-13)	Kokcharov 8	Helliniko Olympic Indoor Arena; Referees: Bavas, Migas (GRE)
28 August 2004; 21:30	2× (yellow card) 5× (suspension)		4× (yellow card) 4× (suspension)	Helliniko Olympic Indoor Arena; Referees: Bavas, Migas (GRE)

=== Women's tournament ===
Roster

The following is the Hungary roster in the women's handball tournament of the 2004 Summer Olympics.

Head coaches: Lajos Mocsai

No.	Pos.	Name	Date of birth (age)	Height	App.	Goals	Club
1	GK	Irina Sirina	7 November 1967 (aged 36)	1.82 m			(Hungary) Győri ETO KC
2	LB	Bernadett Ferling	13 July 1977 (aged 27)	1.80 m			(Hungary) Dunaferr SE
3	P	Beáta Bohus	25 April 1971 (aged 33)	1.72 m			(Hungary) Dunaferr SE
4	RB	Ibolya Mehlmann	4 November 1981 (aged 22)	1.85 m			(Hungary) Győri ETO KC
5	RW	Zsuzsanna Pálffy	26 December 1970 (aged 33)	1.80 m			(Hungary) Dunaferr SE
6	LW	Erika Kirsner	23 December 1975 (aged 28)	1.73 m			(Hungary) Ferencvárosi TC
9	RB	Bojana Radulovics	23 March 1973 (aged 31)	1.79 m			(Hungary) Dunaferr SE
10	CB	Krisztina Pigniczki	18 September 1975 (aged 28)	1.71 m			(Hungary) Dunaferr SE
11	LB	Ágnes Farkas	21 April 1973 (aged 31)	1.84 m			(Denmark) Aalborg DH
13	CB	Anita Görbicz	13 May 1983 (aged 21)	1.75 m			(Hungary) Győri ETO KC
15	CB	Eszter Ágnes Siti	12 November 1977 (aged 26)	1.71 m			(Denmark) FCK Håndbold
16	GK	Katalin Pálinger	6 December 1978 (aged 25)	1.83 m			(Hungary) Dunaferr SE
17	LB	Tímea Tóth	16 September 1980 (aged 23)	1.81 m			(Hungary) Ferencvárosi TC
18	RW	Zsuzsanna Lovász	2 October 1976 (aged 27)	1.73 m			(Hungary) Dunaferr SE
19	P	Anita Kulcsár	2 October 1976 (aged 27)	1.78 m			(Hungary) Dunaferr SE

Group play

Pos	Team	Pld	W	D	L	GF	GA	GD	Pts	Qualification
1	Ukraine	4	4	0	0	99	82	+17	8	Quarterfinals
2	Hungary	4	3	0	1	118	93	+25	6	Quarterfinals
3	China	4	2	0	2	106	90	+16	4	Quarterfinals
4	Brazil	4	1	0	3	97	105	−8	2	Quarterfinals
5	Greece (H)	4	0	0	4	74	124	−50	0	

Rules for classification: 1) Points; 2) Head-to-head points; 3) Head-to-head goal difference; 4) Head-to-head goals scored; 5) Goal difference; 6) Goals scored; 7) Draw.
(H) Hosts

15 August 2004; 14:30	China	24 – 28	Hungary	Sports Pavilion; Referees: Aly Hassan, Yasser (EGY)
15 August 2004; 14:30	Li Weiwei 8	(11-14)	Kulcsár, Radulovics 8	Sports Pavilion; Referees: Aly Hassan, Yasser (EGY)
15 August 2004; 14:30	4× (yellow card) 11× (suspension)		3× (yellow card) 11× (suspension)	Sports Pavilion; Referees: Aly Hassan, Yasser (EGY)

17 August 2004; 16:30	Hungary	33 - 20	Greece	Sports Pavilion, Athens; Referees: Gardinovacki, Maric (SCG)
17 August 2004; 16:30	Kirsner, Siti 6	(15-9)	Gioupi 8	Sports Pavilion, Athens; Referees: Gardinovacki, Maric (SCG)
17 August 2004; 16:30	3× (yellow card) 4× (suspension)		3× (yellow card) 8× (suspension) 1× (red card)	Sports Pavilion, Athens; Referees: Gardinovacki, Maric (SCG)

21 August 2004; 21:30	Brazil	26 - 35	Hungary	Sports Pavilion, Athens; Referees: Breto, Huelin Trillo (ESP)
21 August 2004; 21:30	A. Silva 8	(14-19)	Radulovics 10	Sports Pavilion, Athens; Referees: Breto, Huelin Trillo (ESP)
21 August 2004; 21:30	3× (yellow card) 4× (suspension)		3× (yellow card) 5× (suspension)	Sports Pavilion, Athens; Referees: Breto, Huelin Trillo (ESP)

23 August 2004; 19:30	Hungary	22 - 23	Ukraine	Sports Pavilion, Athens; Referees: Oie, Togstad (NOR)
23 August 2004; 19:30	Radulovics 9	(12-8)	Lyapina 8	Sports Pavilion, Athens; Referees: Oie, Togstad (NOR)
23 August 2004; 19:30	2× (yellow card) 7× (suspension)		3× (yellow card) 6× (suspension) 1× (red card)	Sports Pavilion, Athens; Referees: Oie, Togstad (NOR)

Quarterfinal

26 August 2004; 16:30	France	25 - 23	Hungary	Helliniko Olympic Indoor Arena; Referees: Bavas, Migas (GRE)
26 August 2004; 16:30	Lejeune 6	(10-13)	Radulovics 6	Helliniko Olympic Indoor Arena; Referees: Bavas, Migas (GRE)
26 August 2004; 16:30	4× (yellow card) 6× (suspension)		4× (yellow card) 4× (suspension)	Helliniko Olympic Indoor Arena; Referees: Bavas, Migas (GRE)

5th-8th Place Semifinal

28 August 2004; 11:30	Hungary	36 – 31	Brazil	Helliniko Olympic Indoor Arena; Referees: Nachevski, Nachevski (MKD)
28 August 2004; 11:30	Radulovics 7	(17-14)	Santos 9	Helliniko Olympic Indoor Arena; Referees: Nachevski, Nachevski (MKD)
28 August 2004; 11:30	3× (yellow card) 2× (suspension)		3× (yellow card) 3× (suspension)	Helliniko Olympic Indoor Arena; Referees: Nachevski, Nachevski (MKD)

Fifth Place Final

29 August 2004; 14:30	Spain	29 - 38	Hungary	Helliniko Olympic Indoor Arena; Referees: Boye, Jensen (DEN)
29 August 2004; 14:30	Puche 7	(15-22)	Radulovics 10	Helliniko Olympic Indoor Arena; Referees: Boye, Jensen (DEN)
29 August 2004; 14:30	3× (yellow card) 3× (suspension)		3× (yellow card) 6× (suspension)	Helliniko Olympic Indoor Arena; Referees: Boye, Jensen (DEN)

== Judo ==
Two Hungarian judoka qualified for the 2004 Summer Olympics.

Athlete	Event	Round of 32	Round of 16	Quarterfinals	Semifinals	Repechage 1	Repechage 2	Repechage 3	Final / BM	
Athlete	Event	Opposition Result	Opposition Result	Opposition Result	Opposition Result	Opposition Result	Opposition Result	Opposition Result	Opposition Result	Rank
Miklós Ungvári	Men's −66 kg	Ismayilov (AZE); W 1010–0012	Pina (POR); L 0001–0011	Did not advance						
Antal Kovács	Men's −100 kg	Inoue (JPN); L 0001–0002	Did not advance							

== Modern pentathlon ==
Four Hungarian athletes qualified to compete in the modern pentathlon event through the European and UIPM World Championships.

Athlete	Event	Shooting (10 m air pistol)			Fencing (épée one touch)			Swimming (200 m freestyle)			Riding (show jumping)			Running (3000 m)			Total points	Final rank
Athlete	Event	Points	Rank	MP Points	Results	Rank	MP points	Time	Rank	MP points	Penalties	Rank	MP points	Time	Rank	MP Points	Total points	Final rank
Gábor Balogh	Men's	175	17	1036	15–16	=15	804	2:10.02	21	1240	28	2	1172	9:49.67	9	1044	5296	8
Ákos Kállai	Men's	179	14	1084	18–13	=6	888	2:14.64	29	1188	196	21	1004	10:08.75	24	968	5132	18
Csilla Füri	Women's	157	29	820	15–16	=16	804	2:15.42	3	1296	28	3	1172	11:07.15	9	1052	5144	11
Zsuzsanna Vörös	Women's	182	3	1120	19–12	5	916	2:15.59	4	1296	76	9	1124	11:22.00	=18	992	5448	1st place, gold medalist(s)

== Rowing ==
Hungarian rowers qualified the following boats:

Men

Athlete	Event	Heats		Repechage		Semifinals		Final	
Athlete	Event	Time	Rank	Time	Rank	Time	Rank	Time	Rank
Gábor Bencsik; Ákos Haller	Double sculls	7:05.20	5 R	6:15.60	1 SA/B	6:23.81	5 FB	6:15.39	11
Zsolt Hirling; Tamás Varga	Lightweight double sculls	6:20.98	2 R	6:22.63	1 SA/B	6:18.23	2 FA	6:24.69	5

Women

Athlete	Event	Heats		Repechage		Semifinals		Final	
Athlete	Event	Time	Rank	Time	Rank	Time	Rank	Time	Rank
Mónika Remsei; Edit Stift	Lightweight double sculls	7:12.79	5 R	7:07.69	4 FC	Bye		7:45.05	15

Qualification Legend: FA=Final A (medal); FB=Final B (non-medal); FC=Final C (non-medal); FD=Final D (non-medal); FE=Final E (non-medal); FF=Final F (non-medal); SA/B=Semifinals A/B; SC/D=Semifinals C/D; SE/F=Semifinals E/F; R=Repechage

== Sailing ==
Hungarian sailors have qualified one boat for each of the following events.

Men

Athlete	Event	Race											Net points	Final rank
Athlete	Event	1	2	3	4	5	6	7	8	9	10	M*	Net points	Final rank
Áron Gádorfalvi	Mistral	12	16	17	26	24	24	22	8	18	~~27~~	25	192	22
Balázs Hajdú	Finn	~~24~~	16	16	20	17	22	20	23	15	14	20	183	23
Csaba Cserép; Péter Czégai	470	15	26	27	~~DNF~~	24	23	22	26	25	21	19	228	27

Women

Athlete	Event	Race											Net points	Final rank
Athlete	Event	1	2	3	4	5	6	7	8	9	10	M*	Net points	Final rank
Lívia Györbiró	Mistral	24	19	22	~~25~~	22	22	25	25	24	21	23	227	24
Anna Payr; Márta Weöres	470	~~OCS~~	9	13	9	20	9	16	9	16	10	17	128	19

M = Medal race; OCS = On course side of the starting line; DSQ = Disqualified; DNF = Did not finish; DNS= Did not start; RDG = Redress given

== Shooting ==
Eight Hungarian shooters (three men and five women) qualified to compete in the following events:

Men

Athlete	Event	Qualification		Final	
Athlete	Event	Points	Rank	Points	Rank
Lajos Pálinkás	25 m rapid fire pistol	577	=12	Did not advance	
Péter Sidi	10 m air rifle	593	=12	Did not advance	
Péter Sidi	50 m rifle prone	591	=24	Did not advance	
Péter Sidi	50 m rifle 3 positions	1157	=19	Did not advance	
Attila Simon	10 m air pistol	562	43	Did not advance	
Attila Simon	50 m pistol	541	36	Did not advance	

Women

Athlete	Event	Qualification		Final	
Athlete	Event	Points	Rank	Points	Rank
Zsófia Csonka	10 m air pistol	377	=26	Did not advance	
Zsófia Csonka	25 m pistol	567	30	Did not advance	
Dorottya Erdős	10 m air pistol	379	=21	Did not advance	
Dorottya Erdős	25 m pistol	557	=34	Did not advance	
Diána Igaly	Skeet	72	1 Q	97	1st place, gold medalist(s)
Éva Joó	10 m air rifle	394	=14	Did not advance	
Éva Joó	50 m rifle 3 positions	570	23	Did not advance	
Beáta Krzyzewsky	10 m air rifle	387	37	Did not advance	
Beáta Krzyzewsky	50 m rifle 3 positions	560	31	Did not advance	

== Swimming ==
Hungarian swimmers earned qualifying standards in the following events (up to a maximum of 2 swimmers in each event at the A-standard time, and 1 at the B-standard time):

Men

Athlete	Event	Heat		Semifinal		Final	
Athlete	Event	Time	Rank	Time	Rank	Time	Rank
Richárd Bodor	100 m breaststroke	1:01.91	12 Q	1:01.88	14	Did not advance	
Richárd Bodor	200 m breaststroke	2:14.36	14 Q	2:12.76	10	Did not advance	
Viktor Bodrogi	200 m backstroke	2:03.16	24	Did not advance			
László Cseh	100 m backstroke	54.80	3 Q	54.86	7 Q	54.61	6
László Cseh	200 m individual medley	1:59.50	1 Q	1:59.65	3 Q	1:58.84	4
László Cseh	400 m individual medley	4:14.26	2 Q	—N/a		4:12.15	3rd place, bronze medalist(s)
Zsolt Gáspár	100 m butterfly	54.43	34	Did not advance			
Dániel Gyurta	200 m breaststroke	2:11.29	1 Q	2:10.75	1 Q	2:10.80	2nd place, silver medalist(s)
Péter Horváth	100 m backstroke	57.29	34	Did not advance			
Tamás Kerékjártó	200 m individual medley	2:01.75	14 Q	2:01.89	13	Did not advance	
Gergő Kis	1500 m freestyle	15:38.06	23	—N/a		Did not advance	
Boldizsár Kiss	400 m freestyle	4:02.87	38	—N/a		Did not advance	
Dávid Kolozár	200 m butterfly	2:01.89	25	Did not advance			
Tamás Szűcs	200 m freestyle	1:52.26	32	Did not advance			
Krisztián Takács	50 m freestyle	23.12	32	Did not advance			
Attila Zubor	100 m freestyle	50.26	28	Did not advance			
Balázs Gercsák; Tamás Kerékjártó; Balázs Makány; Tamás Szűcs	4 × 200 m freestyle relay	7:31.78	16	—N/a		Did not advance	
Richárd Bodor; László Cseh; Zsolt Gáspár; Attila Zubor	4 × 100 m medley relay	3:37.27	5 Q	—N/a		3:37.46	7

Women

Athlete	Event	Heat		Semifinal		Final	
Athlete	Event	Time	Rank	Time	Rank	Time	Rank
Beatrix Boulsevicz	100 m butterfly	1:00.18	18	Did not advance			
Beatrix Boulsevicz	200 m butterfly	2:12.54	17	Did not advance			
Zsuzsanna Csobánki	50 m freestyle	27.09	=41	Did not advance			
Katinka Hosszú	200 m freestyle	2:04.22	31	Did not advance			
Zsuzsanna Jakabos	400 m individual medley	4:47.21	15	—N/a		Did not advance	
Ágnes Kovács	100 m breaststroke	1:09.51	11 Q	1:09.12	10	Did not advance	
Ágnes Kovács	200 m breaststroke	2:26.90	4 Q	2:26.63	5 Q	2:26.12	5
Ágnes Kovács	200 m individual medley	2:15.17	7 Q	2:14.68	8 Q	2:13.58	4
Ágnes Mutina	100 m freestyle	58.10	38	Did not advance			
Diana Remenyi	200 m breaststroke	DNS		Did not advance			
Éva Risztov	400 m freestyle	4:12.08	15	—N/a		Did not advance	
Éva Risztov	200 m butterfly	2:10.49	3 Q	2:09.83	6 Q	2:10.58	8
Éva Risztov	400 m individual medley	4:41.20	4 Q	—N/a		4:39.29	4
Nikolett Szepesi	100 m backstroke	1:02.71	28	Did not advance			
Evelyn Verrasztó	200 m backstroke	2:14.07	12 Q	2:13.98	14	Did not advance	

== Table tennis ==
Three Hungarian table tennis players qualified for the following events.

Athlete	Event	Round 1	Round 2	Round 3	Round 4	Quarterfinals	Semifinals	Final / BM	
Athlete	Event	Opposition Result	Opposition Result	Opposition Result	Opposition Result	Opposition Result	Opposition Result	Opposition Result	Rank
Csilla Bátorfi	Women's singles	Bye	Cada (CAN); L 3–4	Did not advance					
Mária Fazekas	Women's singles	Inoyatova (UZB); W 4–0	Kim H-M (PRK); L 1–4	Did not advance					
Krisztina Tóth	Women's singles	Bye	Oshonaike (NGR); W 4–2	Tie Y N (HKG); L 1–4	Did not advance				
Csilla Bátorfi; Krisztina Tóth	Women's doubles	Bye			Boroš / Vaida (CRO); L 1–4	Did not advance			

== Tennis ==
Hungary nominated four female tennis players to compete in the tournament.

Athlete	Event	Round of 64	Round of 32	Round of 16	Quarterfinals	Semifinals	Final / BM	
Athlete	Event	Opposition Score	Opposition Score	Opposition Score	Opposition Score	Opposition Score	Opposition Score	Rank
Melinda Czink	Women's singles	Williams (USA); L 1–6, 2–6	Did not advance					
Petra Mandula	Women's singles	Schnyder (SUI); L 3–6, 4–6	Did not advance					
Melinda Czink; Anikó Kapros	Women's doubles	—N/a	Morigami / Obata (JPN); L 6–3, 5–7, 3–6	Did not advance				
Petra Mandula; Kira Nagy	Women's doubles	—N/a	Martinez / Ruano Pascual (ESP); L 4–6, 0–6	Did not advance				

== Triathlon ==
Two Hungarian triathletes qualified for the following events.

Athlete	Event	Swim (1.5 km)	Trans 1	Bike (40 km)	Trans 2	Run (10 km)	Total Time	Rank
Csaba Kuttor	Men's	Did not start						
Erika Molnár	Women's	20:36	0:18	1:17:59	0:24	39:18	2:17:53.38	38

== Water polo ==
=== Men's tournament ===
Roster

The following is the Hungarian roster in the men's water polo tournament of the 2004 Summer Olympics.

Head coach: Dénes Kemény

№	Name	Pos.	Height	Weight	Date of birth	2004 club
1	Zoltán Szécsi	GK	1.98 m (6 ft 6 in)	93 kg (205 lb)	22 December 1977	(Hungary) BVSC Vízilabda
2	Tamás Varga	CB	1.92 m (6 ft 4 in)	88 kg (194 lb)	14 July 1975	(Hungary) Vasas SC
3	Norbert Madaras	CF	1.91 m (6 ft 3 in)	87 kg (192 lb)	1 December 1979	(Hungary) Vasas SC
4	Ádám Steinmetz	CF	1.97 m (6 ft 6 in)	95 kg (209 lb)	11 August 1980	(Hungary) Vasas SC
5	Tamás Kásás	D	2.01 m (6 ft 7 in)	90 kg (200 lb)	20 July 1976	(Hungary) Vasas SC
6	Attila Vári	CB	2.00 m (6 ft 7 in)	93 kg (205 lb)	26 February 1976	(Hungary) Budapesti Honvéd SE
7	Gergely Kiss	CF	1.97 m (6 ft 6 in)	100 kg (220 lb)	21 September 1977	(Hungary) Budapesti Honvéd SE
8	Tibor Benedek (C)	CF	1.90 m (6 ft 3 in)	96 kg (212 lb)	12 July 1972	(Italy) Pro Recco
9	Rajmund Fodor	D	1.90 m (6 ft 3 in)	94 kg (207 lb)	21 February 1976	(Hungary) Budapesti Honvéd SE
10	István Gergely	GK	2.02 m (6 ft 8 in)	110 kg (240 lb)	20 August 1976	(Hungary) Budapesti Honvéd SE
11	Barnabás Steinmetz	CB	1.96 m (6 ft 5 in)	98 kg (216 lb)	6 October 1975	(Hungary) Vasas SC
12	Tamás Molnár	CF	1.95 m (6 ft 5 in)	98 kg (216 lb)	2 August 1975	(Hungary) Budapesti Honvéd SE
13	Péter Biros	CF	1.94 m (6 ft 4 in)	95 kg (209 lb)	5 April 1976	(Hungary) Budapesti Honvéd SE

Group play

Pos	Team	Pld	W	D	L	GF	GA	GD	Pts	Qualification
1	Hungary	5	5	0	0	44	27	+17	10	Qualified for the semifinals
2	Serbia and Montenegro	5	4	0	1	37	26	+11	8	Qualified for the quarterfinals
3	Russia	5	3	0	2	32	28	+4	6	Qualified for the quarterfinals
4	United States	5	2	0	3	32	37	−5	4	
5	Croatia	5	1	0	4	35	41	−6	2	
6	Kazakhstan	5	0	0	5	21	42	−21	0	

15 August 2004; 10:45	Serbia and Montenegro	4–6	Hungary	Athens Olympic Aquatic Centre; Referees: Borrell (ESP), Petronilli (ITA)
15 August 2004; 10:45	Score by quarters: 1-0, 2-3, 1-0, 0-3			Athens Olympic Aquatic Centre; Referees: Borrell (ESP), Petronilli (ITA)
15 August 2004; 10:45	Trbojević 2	Goals	Kiss 2	Athens Olympic Aquatic Centre; Referees: Borrell (ESP), Petronilli (ITA)

17 August 2004; 22:15	Hungary	10–8	Croatia	Athens Olympic Aquatic Centre; Referees: Borrell (ESP), Bookelman (NED)
17 August 2004; 22:15	Score by quarters: 1-0, 4-2, 4-4, 1-2			Athens Olympic Aquatic Centre; Referees: Borrell (ESP), Bookelman (NED)
17 August 2004; 22:15	Kásás, Biros 3	Goals	Burić, Štritof 2	Athens Olympic Aquatic Centre; Referees: Borrell (ESP), Bookelman (NED)

19 August 2004; 10:45	United States	5–7	Hungary	Athens Olympic Aquatic Centre; Referees: Margeta (SLO), Tulga (TUR)
19 August 2004; 10:45	Score by quarters: 2-2, 2-3, 0-1, 1-1			Athens Olympic Aquatic Centre; Referees: Margeta (SLO), Tulga (TUR)
19 August 2004; 10:45	Azevedo 2	Goals	Varga, Madaras 2	Athens Olympic Aquatic Centre; Referees: Margeta (SLO), Tulga (TUR)

21 August 2004; 09:30	Kazakhstan	4–14	Hungary	Athens Olympic Aquatic Centre; Referees: Koryzna (POL), Patelli (BRA)
21 August 2004; 09:30	Score by quarters: 1-3, 0-4, 2-4, 1-3			Athens Olympic Aquatic Centre; Referees: Koryzna (POL), Patelli (BRA)
21 August 2004; 09:30	4 players with 1	Goals	Kásás, Kiss 3	Athens Olympic Aquatic Centre; Referees: Koryzna (POL), Patelli (BRA)

23 August 2004; 18:15	Russia	6–7	Hungary	Athens Olympic Aquatic Centre; Referees: Margeta (SLO), Stavropoulos (GRE)
23 August 2004; 18:15	Score by quarters: 1-2, 1-1, 1-3, 3-1			Athens Olympic Aquatic Centre; Referees: Margeta (SLO), Stavropoulos (GRE)
23 August 2004; 18:15	Eryshov, Garbuzov 2	Goals	Kiss 2	Athens Olympic Aquatic Centre; Referees: Margeta (SLO), Stavropoulos (GRE)

Semifinal

27 August 2004; 18:15	Hungary	7–5	Russia	Athens Olympic Aquatic Centre; Referees: Chaney (USA), Bock (GER)
27 August 2004; 18:15	Score by quarters: 2-2, 3-3, 2-0, 0-0			Athens Olympic Aquatic Centre; Referees: Chaney (USA), Bock (GER)
27 August 2004; 18:15	Kásás 3	Goals	Garbuzov 2	Athens Olympic Aquatic Centre; Referees: Chaney (USA), Bock (GER)

Gold Medal Final

29 August 2004; 17:30	Hungary	8–7	Serbia and Montenegro	Athens Olympic Aquatic Centre; Referees: Balfanbayev (KAZ), Petronilli (ITA)
29 August 2004; 17:30	Score by quarters: 2-3, 3-2, 0-2, 3-0			Athens Olympic Aquatic Centre; Referees: Balfanbayev (KAZ), Petronilli (ITA)
29 August 2004; 17:30	Kiss 4	Goals	Šapić 2	Athens Olympic Aquatic Centre; Referees: Balfanbayev (KAZ), Petronilli (ITA)

Won Gold Medal

=== Women's tournament ===
Roster

The following is the Hungarian roster in the women's water polo tournament of the 2004 Summer Olympics.

Head coach: Tamás Faragó

№	Name	Pos.	Height	Weight	Date of birth	2004 club
1	Ildikó Zirighné Sós	GK	1.78 m (5 ft 10 in)	65 kg (143 lb)	27 December 1976	(Hungary) Dunaújvárosi FVE
2	Zsuzsanna Tiba	CF	1.75 m (5 ft 9 in)	80 kg (180 lb)	31 March 1976	(Hungary) Dunaújvárosi FVE
3	Anett Györe	D	1.72 m (5 ft 8 in)	77 kg (170 lb)	10 December 1981	(Hungary) BVSC Vízilabda
4	Dóra Kisteleki	CF	1.73 m (5 ft 8 in)	60 kg (130 lb)	11 May 1983	(Hungary) Vasas SC
5	Mercédesz Stieber (C)	D	1.74 m (5 ft 9 in)	65 kg (143 lb)	4 September 1974	(Italy) Rari Nantes Pescara
6	Erzsébet Valkai	CB	1.76 m (5 ft 9 in)	70 kg (150 lb)	6 March 1979	(Italy) Rari Nantes Pescara
7	Rita Dravucz	D	1.80 m (5 ft 11 in)	69 kg (152 lb)	14 April 1980	(Italy) Geymonat Orizzonte
8	Krisztina Zantleitner	CB	1.84 m (6 ft 0 in)	72 kg (159 lb)	8 May 1974	(Hungary) Dunaújvárosi FVE
9	Krisztina Szremkó	CB	1.81 m (5 ft 11 in)	90 kg (200 lb)	6 January 1972	(Hungary) Szentesi VK
10	Anikó Pelle	CF	1.85 m (6 ft 1 in)	72 kg (159 lb)	28 September 1978	(Italy) Geymonat Orizzonte
11	Ágnes Valkai	CF	1.68 m (5 ft 6 in)	64 kg (141 lb)	27 February 1981	(Italy) Rari Nantes Pescara
12	Ágnes Primász	CF	1.76 m (5 ft 9 in)	63 kg (139 lb)	5 March 1980	(Hungary) Dunaújvárosi FVE
13	Andrea Tóth	GK	1.83 m (6 ft 0 in)	70 kg (150 lb)	7 August 1981	(Hungary) Dunaújvárosi FVE

Group play

Pos	Team	Pld	W	D	L	GF	GA	GD	Pts	Qualification
1	United States	3	2	0	1	20	16	+4	4	Qualified for the Semifinals
2	Russia	3	2	0	1	21	22	−1	4	Qualified for the Quarterfinals
3	Hungary	3	1	0	2	19	20	−1	2	Qualified for the Quarterfinals
4	Canada	3	1	0	2	16	18	−2	2	

16 August 2004; 09:30	Report	United States	7–6	Hungary	Athens Olympic Aquatic Centre; Referees: Nikolaos Stavropoulos (GRE); Mario Brguljan (SCG)
16 August 2004; 09:30	Report	Score by quarters: 4–1, 0–2, 1–2, 2–1			Athens Olympic Aquatic Centre; Referees: Nikolaos Stavropoulos (GRE); Mario Brguljan (SCG)
16 August 2004; 09:30	Report	Villa 4 Rulon 2 Golda 1	Goals	Dravucz 1 Pelle 1 Primász 1 Stieber 1 Tiba 1 Zantleitner 1	Athens Olympic Aquatic Centre; Referees: Nikolaos Stavropoulos (GRE); Mario Brguljan (SCG)

18 August 2004; 16:30	Report	Russia	9–8	Hungary	Athens Olympic Aquatic Centre; Referees: Peter Bookelman (NED); Torsten Bock (GER)
18 August 2004; 16:30	Report	Score by quarters: 2–1, 3–3, 2–3, 2–1			Athens Olympic Aquatic Centre; Referees: Peter Bookelman (NED); Torsten Bock (GER)
18 August 2004; 16:30	Report	Konukh 3 Salimova 3 Turova 3	Goals	Kisteleki 2 Primász 2 Stieber 2 Dravucz 1 Pelle 1	Athens Olympic Aquatic Centre; Referees: Peter Bookelman (NED); Torsten Bock (GER)

20 August 2004; 16:45	Report	Hungary	5–4	Canada	Athens Olympic Aquatic Centre; Referees: R adu Matache (ROU); Roberto Pentronilli (ITA)
20 August 2004; 16:45	Report	Score by quarters: 1–2, 2–0, 2–1, 0–1			Athens Olympic Aquatic Centre; Referees: R adu Matache (ROU); Roberto Pentronilli (ITA)
20 August 2004; 16:45	Report	Stieber 2 Kisteleki 1 Primász 1 Valkay 1	Goals	Bégin 1 Dionne 1 Gardiner 1 Salat 1	Athens Olympic Aquatic Centre; Referees: R adu Matache (ROU); Roberto Pentronilli (ITA)

Quarterfinal

22 August 2004; 18:15	Report	Italy	8–5	Hungary	Athens Olympic Aquatic Centre; Referees: Sergio Borrell (ESP); Boris Margeta (SLO)
22 August 2004; 18:15	Report	Score by quarters: 2–1, 2–2, 2–2, 2–0			Athens Olympic Aquatic Centre; Referees: Sergio Borrell (ESP); Boris Margeta (SLO)
22 August 2004; 18:15	Report	di Mario 3 Bosurgi 1 Grego 1 Malato 1 Miceli 1 Ragusa 1	Goals	Dravucz 2 Stieber 2 Pelle 1	Athens Olympic Aquatic Centre; Referees: Sergio Borrell (ESP); Boris Margeta (SLO)

Fifth-Sixth Place Final

24 August 2004; 10:45	Report	Russia	12–11 (OT)	Hungary	Athens Olympic Aquatic Centre; Referees: Daniel Legare (CAN); Noel Harrod (AUS)
24 August 2004; 10:45	Report	Score by quarters: 3–5, 1–2, 4–0, 2–3 OT: 1–0, 1–1			Athens Olympic Aquatic Centre; Referees: Daniel Legare (CAN); Noel Harrod (AUS)
24 August 2004; 10:45	Report	Salimova 4 Konukh 2 Yaina 2 Bogdanova 1 Smurova 1 Turova 1 Vasilieva 1	Goals	Dravucz 3 Stieber 3 Kisteleki 2 Györe 1 Pelle 1 Szremkó 1	Athens Olympic Aquatic Centre; Referees: Daniel Legare (CAN); Noel Harrod (AUS)

== Weightlifting ==
Seven Hungarian weightlifters qualified for the following events: Ferenc Gyurkovics originally claimed the silver in men's 105 kg class, but the International Olympic Committee decided to strip of his medal after he was tested positive for oxandrolone and anabolic steroids.

Men

Athlete	Event	Snatch		Clean & Jerk		Total	Rank
Athlete	Event	Result	Rank	Result	Rank	Total	Rank
László Tancsics	−56 kg	122.5	6	150	7	272.5	7
Attila Feri	−77 kg	155	=11	200	=2	355	6
Ferenc Gyurkovics	−105 kg	195	=1	225	3	410	DSQ
Zoltán Kovács	−105 kg	~~180~~	DNF	—	—	—	DSQ

Women

Athlete	Event	Snatch		Clean & Jerk		Total	Rank
Athlete	Event	Result	Rank	Result	Rank	Total	Rank
Eszter Krutzler	−69 kg	117.5	=2	145	=2	262.5	2nd place, silver medalist(s)
Gyöngyi Likerecz	−75 kg	115	5	142.5	=4	257.5	4
Viktória Varga	+75 kg	127.5	4	155	=4	282.5	4

== Wrestling ==
Key:

- VT - Victory by Fall.
- PP - Decision by Points - the loser with technical points.
- PO - Decision by Points - the loser without technical points.

Men's freestyle

Athlete	Event	Elimination Pool			Quarterfinal	Semifinal	Final / BM	
Athlete	Event	Opposition Result	Opposition Result	Rank	Opposition Result	Opposition Result	Opposition Result	Rank
Gergõ Wöller	−60 kg	Uulu (KGZ); L 0–3 ^{PO}	Fedoryshyn (UKR); L 0–3 ^{PO}	3	Did not advance			19
Gábor Hatos	−66 kg	Fernyák (SVK); W 3–1 ^{PP}	Çubukçu (TUR); L 1–3 ^{PP}	2	Did not advance			15
Árpád Ritter	−74 kg	Saitiev (RUS); L 1–3 ^{PP}	Bentinidis (GRE); L 1–3 ^{PP}	3	Did not advance			16
Ottó Aubéli	−120 kg	Kuramagomedov (RUS); L 0–3 ^{PO}	Modebadze (GEO); L 0–3 ^{PO}	3	Did not advance			18

Men's Greco-Roman

Athlete	Event	Elimination Pool				Quarterfinal	Semifinal	Final / BM	
Athlete	Event	Opposition Result	Opposition Result	Opposition Result	Rank	Opposition Result	Opposition Result	Opposition Result	Rank
István Majoros	−55 kg	Toyota (JPN); W 3–1 ^{PP}	Ramírez (DOM); W 3–0 ^{PO}	—N/a	1 Q	Rivas (CUB); W 3–1 ^{PP}	Vakulenko (UKR); W 3–1 ^{PP}	Mamedaliyev (RUS); W 3–1 ^{PP}	1st place, gold medalist(s)
Levente Füredy	−66 kg	Gergov (BUL); L 1–3 ^{PP}	Kim I-S (KOR); L 1–3 ^{PP}	—N/a	3	Did not advance			15
Tamás Berzicza	−74 kg	Dokturishvili (UZB); L 1–3 ^{PP}	Kolitsopoulos (GRE); W 3–0 ^{PO}	Aslanov (AZE); W 5–0 ^{VB}	2	Did not advance			8
Lajos Virág	−96 kg	Lowney (USA); W 3–0 ^{PO}	Peña (CUB); L 1–3 ^{PP}	—N/a	2	Did not advance			9
Mihály Deák-Bárdos	−120 kg	Ahokas (FIN); W 3–0 ^{PO}	Barzi (IRI); L 1–3 ^{PP}	—N/a	2	Did not advance			10

== See also ==
- Hungary at the 2004 Summer Paralympics
