= Fencing at the 2004 Summer Olympics – Men's sabre =

Men's sabre at the Games of the XXVIII Olympiad
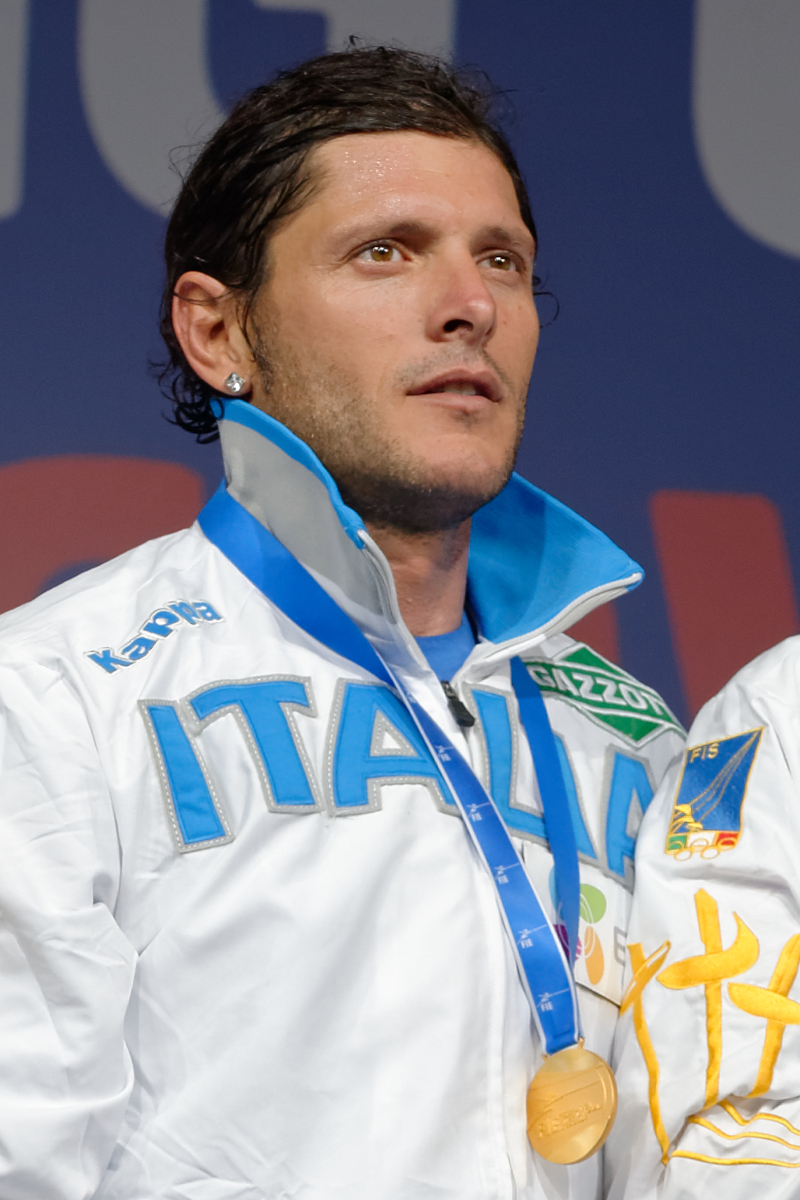
- Aldo Montano (2015)
- Venue: Helliniko Olympic Complex
- Date: August 14, 2004
- Competitors: 39 from 21 nations

Medalists
1st place, gold medalist(s)		Aldo Montano	Italy
2nd place, silver medalist(s)		Zsolt Nemcsik	Hungary
3rd place, bronze medalist(s)		Vladislav Tretiak	Ukraine

The men's sabre was a competition in fencing at the 2004 Summer Olympics in Athens. A total of 39 men from 21 nations competed in this event. Nations had been limited to three fencers each since 1928. Competition took place in the Fencing Hall at the Helliniko Olympic Complex on August 14. The event was won by Aldo Montano of Italy, the nation's first victory in the men's sabre since 1920 (and second overall). Montano accomplished what his grandfather (Aldo Montano) and father (Mario Aldo Montano), both world champions in the individual event and Olympic medalists in the team competition, had not been able to: Olympic gold in the individual event. Zsolt Nemcsik of Hungary took silver while Vladislav Tretiak earned Ukraine's first medal in the event with his bronze. France's five-Games medal streak ended.

== Background ==
This was the 25th appearance of the event, which is the only fencing event to have been held at every Summer Olympics. Four of the quarterfinalists from 2000 returned: gold medalist Mihai Covaliu of Romania, bronze medalist Wiradech Kothny of Germany, fourth-place finisher Domonkos Ferjancsik of Hungary, and fifth-place finisher (and 1996 bronze medalist) Damien Touya of France. The favorites were Russia's Stanislav Pozdnyakov (1996 gold medalist and 1997, 2001, and 2002 world champion) and Ukraine's Volodymyr Lukashenko (2003 world champion).

The Republic of the Congo made its debut in the men's sabre. Italy made its 23rd appearance in the event, most of any nation, having missed the inaugural 1896 event and the 1904 Games.

== Competition format ==
The 1996 tournament had vastly simplified the competition format into a single-elimination bracket, with a bronze medal match. The 2004 tournament continued to use that format. Bouts were to 15 touches. Standard sabre rules regarding target area, striking, and priority were used.

== Schedule ==
All times are Greece Standard Time (UTC+2)

Date	Time	Round
Saturday, 14 August 2004	10:00; 10:40; 12:00; 12:50; 18:30; 19:20	Preliminary round Round of 32; Round of 16; Quarterfinals; Semifinals; Finals

== Results ==
=== Preliminary round ===
As there were more than 32 entrants in this event, seven first round matches were held to reduce the field to 32 fencers.

Agresta (BRA)	15—14	Rebai (TUN)
Huang (CHN)	15—6	Bernaoui (ALG)
Zhou (CHN)	15—10	Dourakos (GRE)
Maya (CUB)	15—13	Kembe (CGO)
Manetas (GRE)	15—10	Bernaoui (ALG)
Chen (CHN)	15—3	Reda (ALG)
Nagara (JPN)	15—8	Basmatzian (GRE)

=== Main tournament bracket ===
The remaining field of 32 fencers competed in a single-elimination tournament to determine the medal winners. Semifinal losers proceeded to a bronze medal match.

Round of 32
Montano (ITA)	15
Manetas (GRE)	12
Smart (USA)	15
Touya (FRA)	11
Sharikov (RUS)	15
Maya (CUB)	9
Pillet (FRA)	15
Oh (KOR)	13
Lapkes (BLR)	15
Chen (CHN)	9
Kaliuzhniy (UKR)	15
Dyachenko (RUS)	10
Pozdnyakov (RUS)	15
Nagara (JPN)	9
Lee (USA)	15
Pastore (ITA)	9
Nemcsik (HUN)	15
Huang (CHN)	12
Ferjancsik (HUN)	15
Boulos (CAN)	8
Covaliu (ROU)	15
Zhou (CHN)	10
Sznajder (POL)	15
Touya (FRA)	14
Tretiak (UKR)	15
Lengyel (HUN)	12
Tarantino (ITA)	15
Rogers (USA)	3
Lukashenko (UKR)	15
Agresta (BRA)	14
Kothny (THA)	15
Medina (ESP)	13

Round of 16
Montano (ITA)	15
Smart (USA)	7
Sharikov (RUS)	15
Pillet (FRA)	11
Lapkes (BLR)	15
Kaliuzhniy (UKR)	9
Pozdnyakov (RUS)	15
Lee (USA)	9
Nemcsik (HUN)	15
Ferjancsik (HUN)	11
Covaliu (ROU)	15
Sznajder (POL)	9
Tretiak (UKR)	15
Tarantino (ITA)	8
Lukashenko (UKR)	15
Kothny (THA)	11

Quarterfinals
Montano (ITA)	15
Sharikov (RUS)	13
Lapkes (BLR)	15
Pozdnyakov (RUS)	9
Nemcsik (HUN)	15
Covaliu (ROU)	14
Tretiak (UKR)	15
Lukashenko (UKR)	12

Semifinals
Montano (ITA)	15
Lapkes (BLR)	6
Nemcsik (HUN)	15
Tretiak (UKR)	11

Gold medal final
Montano (ITA)	15
Nemcsik (HUN)	14
Bronze medal final
Tretiak (UKR)	15
Lapkes (BLR)	11

== Final classification ==
Rank	Fencer	Nation
1st place, gold medalist(s)	Aldo Montano	Italy
2nd place, silver medalist(s)	Zsolt Nemcsik	Hungary
3rd place, bronze medalist(s)	Vladyslav Tretiak	Ukraine
4	Dmitry Lapkes	Belarus
5	Volodymyr Lukashenko	Ukraine
6	Stanislav Pozdnyakov	Russia
7	Mihai Covaliu	Romania
8	Sergey Sharikov	Russia
9	Luigi Tarantino	Italy
10	Domonkos Ferjancsik	Hungary
11	Julien Pillet	France
12	Ivan Lee	United States
13	Wiradech Kothny	Thailand
14	Rafał Sznajder	Poland
15	Keeth Smart	United States
16	Volodymyr Kaliuzhniy	Ukraine
17	Aleksey Dyachenko	Russia
18	Balázs Lengyel	Hungary
19	Gaël Touya	France
20	Damien Touya	France
21	Fernando Medina	Spain
22	Gianpiero Pastore	Italy
23	O Eun-Seok	South Korea
24	Michel Boulos	Canada
25	Jason Rogers	United States
26	Chen Feng	China
27	Huang Yaojiang	China
28	Kostas Manetas	Greece
29	Cándido Maya	Cuba
30	Zhou Hanming	China
31	Masashi Nagara	Japan
32	Renzo Agresta	Brazil
33	Mohamed Rebai	Tunisia
34	Marios Basmatzian	Greece
35	Jason Dourakos	Greece
36	Sorel-Arthur Kembe	Republic of the Congo
37	Raouf Salim Bernaoui	Algeria
38	Reda Ben Chehima	Algeria
39	Nassim Islam Bernaoui	Algeria
