= Dorina =

Dorina is a feminine given name, related to Dora, which in Latin and Greek means "gift" or "gift of God".

== People ==
- Dorina Böczögő (born 1992), Hungarian gymnast
- Dorina Emilia Carbune (born 1985), Romanian handball player
- Dorina Catineanu (born 1954), Romanian retired long jumper
- Dorina Frati, Italian mandolin player
- Dorina Korsós (born 1995), Hungarian handball player
- Dorina Mihai (born 1981), Romanian fencer
- Dorina Mitrea (born 1965), Romanian-American mathematician
- Dorina Neave (1880–1955), British writer
- Dorina Szekeres (born 1992), Hungarian swimmer
- Dorina Vaccaroni (born 1964), Italian fencer
- Dorina Zele (born 1992), Hungarian basketball player

== Fictional characters ==
- Dorina Basarab, in a series of books by Karen Chance

== See also ==
- Dorino (given name)
