= 2008 African Fencing Championships =

The 2008 African Fencing Championships were the eighth edition of a top-level fencing competition organized by the African Fencing Confederation.

The events were held in Casablanca, Morocco from 26 to 28 April with twelve of nineteen countries participating. The athletes competed in six weapon categories. This was the first year the championships would also be a zonal qualifier for the Olympic Games.

== Medal summary ==
=== Men's events ===
| Event | Gold | Silver | Bronze |
|---|---|---|---|
| Foil | Alaaeldin Abouelkassem (EGY) | Karim Kamoun (TUN) | Xavier Ali (MAR); Tamer Mohamed Tahoun (EGY) |
| Épée | Ahmed El Saghir (EGY) | Ahmed Nabil (EGY) | Ayman Alaa El Din Fayz (EGY); Mohamed Ayoub Ferjani (TUN) |
| Sabre | Mamoudou Keita (SEN) | Samir Mahmoud (EGY) | Mohamed Rebai (TUN); Gamal Fathy (EGY) |
| Team Foil | Egypt | Tunisia | Morocco |
| Team Épée | Egypt | Tunisia | Senegal |
| Team Sabre | Tunisia | Egypt | Senegal |

=== Women's events ===
| Event | Gold | Silver | Bronze |
|---|---|---|---|
| Foil | Inès Boubakri (TUN) | Shaimaa El-Gammal (EGY) | Eman El-Gammal (EGY); Iman Shaban (EGY) |
| Épée | Mona Abdel Aziz (EGY) | Imene Ben Chaabane (TUN) | Sarra Besbes (TUN); Ndeye Binta Diongue (SEN) |
| Sabre | Azza Besbes (TUN) | Chaima Fathalli (TUN) | Hela Besbes (EGY); Adja Yacine Sarr (SEN) |
| Team Foil | Egypt | Tunisia | Algeria |
| Team Épée | Tunisia | Algeria | Senegal |
| Team Sabre | Tunisia | Senegal | Morocco |

== Medal table ==
Host

* Host nation (Morocco)

| Rank | Nation | Gold | Silver | Bronze | Total |
|---|---|---|---|---|---|
| 1 | Egypt | 6 | 4 | 6 | 16 |
| 2 | Tunisia | 5 | 6 | 3 | 14 |
| 3 | Senegal | 1 | 1 | 5 | 7 |
| 4 | Algeria | 0 | 1 | 1 | 2 |
| 5 | Morocco* | 0 | 0 | 3 | 3 |
| Totals (5 entries) | | 12 | 12 | 18 | 42 |
