= 2003 World Fencing Championships =

International fencing competition

2003 World Championships in Fencing
- Dates: October 5 – 11
- Host city: Havana, Cuba

The 2003 World Fencing Championships were held in Havana, Cuba. The event took place from October 5 to October 11, 2003.

== Medal summary ==
=== Men's events ===
Event	Gold	Silver	Bronze
Épée	Fabrice Jeannet (FRA)	Maksym Khvorost (UKR)	Ulrich Robeiri (FRA); Vitaly Zakharov (BLR)
Foil	Peter Joppich (GER)	Simone Vanni (ITA)	Brice Guyart (FRA); Andrea Cassarà (ITA)
Sabre	Volodymyr Lukashenko (UKR)	Mihai Covaliu (ROU)	Aldo Montano (ITA); Domonkos Ferjancsik (HUN)
Team Épée	Russia; Pavel Kolobkov; Sergey Kochetkov; Aleksey Selin; Igor Turchin	Germany; Jörg Fiedler; Norman Ackermann; Christoph Kneip; Wolfgang Raich	Sweden; Fredrik Nilsson; Robert Dingl; Péter Vánky; Magnus Malmgren
Team Foil	Italy; Andrea Cassarà; Marco Ramacci; Salvatore Sanzo; Simone Vanni	China; Wang Haibin; Wu Hanxiong; Ye Chong; Zhu Rui	Germany; Ralf Bißdorf; Dominik Behr; Peter Joppich; André Weßels
Team Sabre	Russia; Sergey Sharikov; Stanislav Pozdnyakov; Aleksey Yakimenko; Aleksey Dyachenko	Hungary; Domonkos Ferjancsik; Kende Fodor; Balázs Lengyel; Zsolt Nemcsik	Ukraine; Dmytro Boiko; Volodymyr Lukashenko; Oleg Shturbabin; Vladyslav Tretiak

=== Women's events ===
Event	Gold	Silver	Bronze
Foil	(Italy) Valentina Vezzali	(Poland) Sylwia Gruchała	(Hungary) Aida Mohamed (Romania) Roxana Scarlat
Épée	(Ukraine) Natalia Konrad	(France) Maureen Nisima	(China) Li Na (Italy) Christiana Cascioli
Sabre	(Romania) Dorina Mihai	(China) Xue Tan	(Italy) Gioia Marzocca (Poland) Aleksandra Socha
Team Épée	(Russia) (Russia) (Russia) (Russia)	(Germany) (Germany) (Germany) (Germany)	(Hungary) (Hungary) (Hungary) (Hungary)
Team Foil	(Poland) (Poland) (Poland) (Poland)	(Russia) (Russia) (Russia) (Russia)	(Romania) (Romania) (Romania) (Romania)
Team Sabre	(Italy) (Italy) (Italy) (Italy)	(China) (China) (China) (China)	(Azerbaijan) (Azerbaijan) (Azerbaijan) (Azerbaijan)

== Medal table ==
Rank	Nation	Gold	Silver	Bronze	Total
1	Italy (ITA)	3	1	4	8
2	Russia (RUS)	3	1	0	4
3	Ukraine (UKR)	2	1	1	4
4	Germany (GER)	1	2	1	4
5	France (FRA)	1	1	2	4
5	Romania (ROM)	1	1	2	4
7	Poland (POL)	1	1	1	3
8	China (CHN)	0	3	1	4
9	Hungary (HUN)	0	1	3	4
10	Azerbaijan (AZE)	0	0	1	1
10	Belarus (BLR)	0	0	1	1
10	Sweden (SWE)	0	0	1	1
Totals (12 entries)		12	12	18	42
