= Yelena Jemayeva =

Russian-born Azerbaijani fencer

Personal information
- Born: 30 March 1971 (age 55) Dolgoprudny, Moscow, Soviet Union (now Russia)
- Height: 1.74 m (5 ft 9 in)
- Weight: 65 kg (143 lb)

Fencing career
- Sport: Fencing
- Weapon: Sabre
- Hand: Right-handed
- Retired: 2008
- FIE ranking: current ranking
Medal record
Women's fencing
Representing Azerbaijan
World Championships
Gold medal – first place	1999 Seoul	Individual sabre
Gold medal – first place	2000 Budapest	Individual sabre
Silver medal – second place	2002 Lisbon	Individual sabre
Bronze medal – third place	1999 Seoul	Team sabre
Bronze medal – third place	2001 Nimes	Individual sabre
Bronze medal – third place	2002 Lisbon	Team sabre
Bronze medal – third place	2003 Havana	Team sabre
European Championships
Gold medal – first place	1999 Bolzano	Individual sabre
Bronze medal – third place	2000 Funchal	Individual sabre
Bronze medal – third place	2002 Moscow	Team sabre
Bronze medal – third place	2003 Bourges	Team sabre

Yelena Jemayeva (Russian: Елена Жемаева, also spelled Elena, born 30 March 1971) is a Russian-born Azerbaijani former sabre fencer. She holds a twice world champion (1999, 2000) and European champion (1999).

She competed in the individual sabre event at the 2004 Summer Olympics but was upset in the quarterfinals by eventual gold medalist Mariel Zagunis of the USA.

Jemayeva lives in Moscow. She is married to the Olympic and world team champion fencer Ilgar Mammadov, Yelena and Ilgar have two daughters: Milena and Ayla.
