= Aleksey Dyachenko =

Russian sabre fencer

Personal information
- Born: 11 November 1978 (age 47) St. Petersburg, Russia
- Height: 1.80 m (5 ft 11 in)
- Weight: 78 kg (172 lb)

Fencing career
- Sport: Fencing
- Weapon: sabre
- Hand: right-handed
- Retired: 2007
- FIE ranking: current ranking
Medal record
Men's sabre
Representing Russia
Olympic Games
Bronze medal – third place	2004 Athens	Sabre team
World Championships
Gold medal – first place	2001 Nîmes	Team sabre
Gold medal – first place	2003 Havana	Team sabre
Gold medal – first place	2005 Leipzig	Team sabre
Bronze medal – third place	1999 Seoul	Team sabre
European Championships
Gold medal – first place	2001 Coblenz	Team sabre
Gold medal – first place	2002 Moscow	Team sabre
Gold medal – first place	2003 Bourges	Team sabre
Gold medal – first place	2004 Copenhagen	Team sabre
Gold medal – first place	2005 Zalaegerseg	Team sabre

Aleksey Vladimirovich Dyachenko (a.k.a. Aleksei Diachenko; Russian: Алексе́й Влади́мирович Дьяче́нко; born 11 November 1978) is a Russian former sabre fencer and a commercial pilot in the United States.

== Personal life ==
He is the son of fencing coaches Vladimir and Natalya Dyachenko. His sister Yekaterina was a world champion sabre fencer.

== Sport career ==
Dyachenko took part in the team sabre event for the 2000 Summer Olympics in Sydney as a reserve of the Russia team, which won a gold medal. He qualified as a full member of the team to the 2004 Summer Olympics in Athens. In the individual event, he lost in the first round to Ukraine's Volodymyr Kaliuzhniy. In the team event, Russia overcame Greece, but fell to Italy in the semifinals. They defeated the United States by a single hit to win the bronze medal. Dyatchenko only participated in the quarter-final.

Dyachenko is also a three-time world champion with the Russian team.

== Commercial pilot career ==
In 2013, he began training in the United States to obtain a commercial pilot license. Upon completion of training, he flew as first officer and pilot in command on the Pilatus PC-12 aircraft in Tradewind Aviation and ExpressJet Airlines. Since October 2020, he has been flying as a co-pilot on the Embraer ERJ 145 aircraft in the CommutAir company. Upon reaching the flight time of 5,000 hours, he is going to work for a large passenger airline.
