= 2000 World Fencing Championships =

International fencing competition

2000 World Championships in Fencing
- Dates: June 29 – July 2
- Host city: Budapest, Hungary.

The 2000 World Fencing Championships were held in Budapest, Hungary. The event took place from June 29 to July 2, 2000, for competitions in women's team sabre and women's individual sabre, both of which were not held at the 2000 Summer Olympics.

== Medal summary ==
Event	Gold	Silver	Bronze
Women's Individual Sabre	Azerbaijan; Yelena Jemayeva	Italy; Ilaria Bianco	France; Anne-Lise Touya; Germany; Sandra Benad
Women's Team Sabre	USA	Italy	France

== Medal table ==
Rank	Nation	Gold	Silver	Bronze	Total
1	Azerbaijan (AZE)	1	0	0	1
1	United States (USA)	1	0	0	1
3	Italy (ITA)	0	2	0	2
4	France (FRA)	0	0	2	2
5	Germany (GER)	0	0	1	1
Totals (5 entries)		2	2	3	7

== See also ==
- Fencing at the 2000 Summer Olympics
