= Anne-Lise Touya =

French fencer (born 1981)

Personal information
- Born: 19 October 1981 (age 44) Tarbes, France

Sport
- Sport: Fencing
- Coached by: René Geuna
Medal record
Women's sabre
Representing France
World Championships
| Gold medal – first place | 2007 Saint Petersburg | Team sabre |
| Gold medal – first place | 2006 Turin | Team sabre |
| Gold medal – first place | 2005 Leipzig | Sabre |
| Gold medal – first place | 2001 Nîmes | Sabre |
| Silver medal – second place | 1999 Seoul | Team sabre |
| Bronze medal – third place | 2004 New York | Team sabre |
| Bronze medal – third place | 2000 Budapest | Sabre |
| Bronze medal – third place | 2000 Budapest | Team sabre |
European Championships
| Gold medal – first place | 2007 Ghent | Team sabre |
| Gold medal – first place | 2005 Zalaegerszeg | Team sabre |
| Gold medal – first place | 2000 Funchal | Sabre |
| Silver medal – second place | 2003 Bourges | Team sabre |
| Silver medal – second place | 2000 Funchal | Team sabre |
| Bronze medal – third place | 2008 Kyiv | Team sabre |
| Bronze medal – third place | 2006 Izmir | Team sabre |

Anne-Lise Touya (born 19 October 1981) is a French fencer. She competed in the sabre events at the 2004 and 2008 Summer Olympics.
