= René Geuna =

French fencer

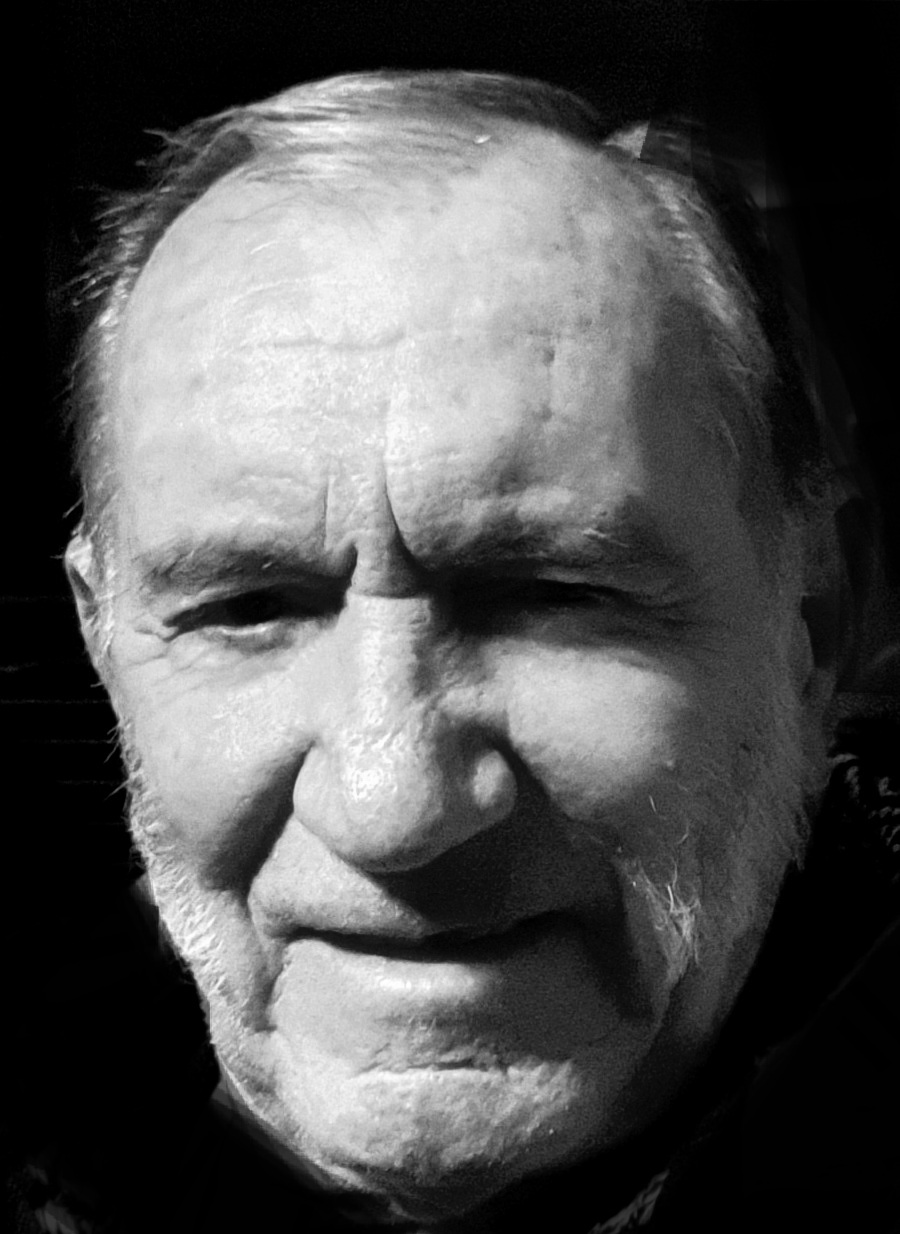

Personal information
- Nationality: French
- Born: 6 February 1943 (age 83) Anja, Morocco

Fencing career
- Sport: Fencing
- Weapon: sabre
- Hand: right-handed
- Retired: 2001

René Geuna (born 6 February 1943 in Anja, Morocco) is a French fencing master specialized in sabre.

He founded the sabre school of the Amicale tarbaise d'escrime in 1973, where he initiated the collective lessons that built the success of the club. His method is based on gamme (French for musical scales), with repetitions of movements of the sabre, to teach fundamental techniques; his methods have been copied across France and abroad. Many of his pupils won World and Olympic titles.

He is known for his technical and educational quality. He coached amongst others the Olympic medallists Philippe Delrieu, Pierre Guichot, Damien Touya, Gaël Touya and Nicolas Lopez, and world champion Anne-Lise Touya.

== Bibliography ==
- Duel escrime Est-ce crime ? (Edilivre, 2016)
- Escrime Fastoche : le collectif (Editions de la Neva, 2024) ISBN 9782916830247
