= Dorino (given name) =

Dorino is an Italian male given name.

People with this given name include:

- Dorino Gattilusio, several members of the Genovesi Byzantine noble family Gattilusi
  - Dorino I Gattilusio (died 1455) Lord of Lesbos
  - Dorino II Gattilusio (died 1488) Lord of Ainos, Samothrace and Imbros
- Dorino Serafini (1909–2000) Italian motorcycle racer and racecar driver
- Dorino Della Valle (20th century) father of Italian businessman Diego Della Valle
- Dorino Vanzo (born 1950) Italian race cyclist

== See also ==
- Dorina (given name)
- Dora (given name)
