= Damien Touya =

French fencer (born 1975)

Personal information
- Nationality: French
- Born: 23 April 1975 (age 51) La Rochelle, Charente-Maritime, France
- Height: 1.85 m (6 ft 1 in)
- Weight: 70 kg (154 lb; 11 st 0 lb)

Fencing career
- Sport: Fencing
- Weapon: Sabre
- Hand: right-handed
- National coach: Christian Peeters
- Head coach: René Geuna
Medal record
Men's fencing
Representing France
Olympic Games
Gold medal – first place	2004 Athens	Sabre, team
Silver medal – second place	2000 Sydney	Sabre, team
Bronze medal – third place	1996 Atlanta	Sabre, individual

Damien Touya (born 23 April 1975) is a French fencer. He won medals at three Olympics. He won a gold medal at the 2004 Summer Olympics in Athens, in the team sabre, together with Julien Pillet and his brother Gaël Touya.
