= Olga Turova =

Russian water polo player

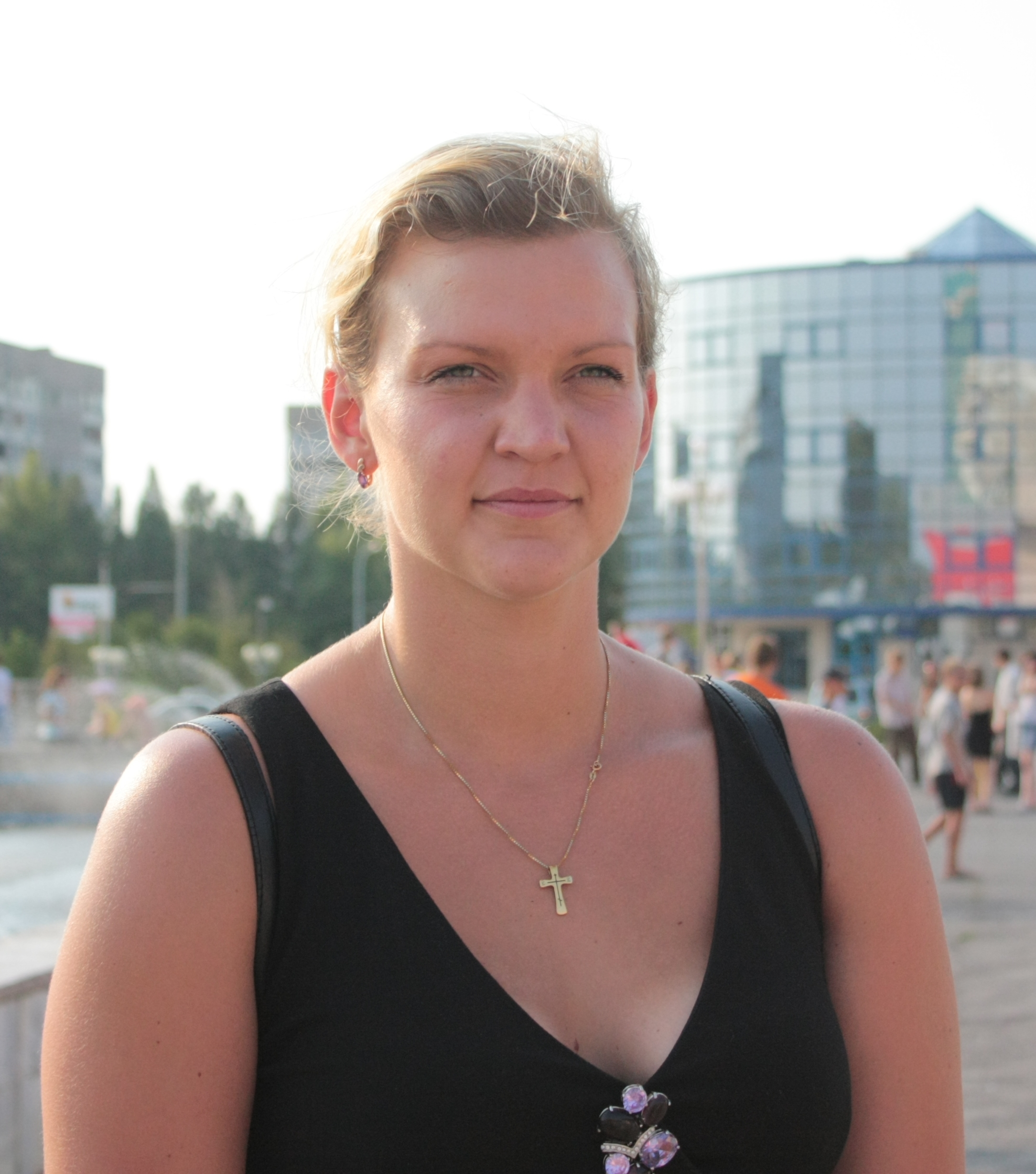

Personal information
- Born: 13 March 1983 (age 43) Volgodonsk, Soviet Union
- Height: 1.75 m (5 ft 9 in)
- Weight: 60 kg (132 lb)

Sport
- Sport: Water polo
- Position: centre forward

Senior clubs
- Years: Team
- ?-? ?-?: Kinef-Surgutneftegaz; Yunost Volgograd
National team
- Years: Team
- ?-?: Russia
Medal record
Representing Russia
World Championships
Bronze medal – third place	2003 Barcelona	Team competition

Olga Gennadyevna Turova (Ukrainian: Ольга Геннадьевна Турова; born 13 March 1983) is a Russian former female water polo player. She was a member of the Russia women's national water polo team, playing as a centre forward.

== Career ==
She was a part of the team at the 2004 Summer Olympics and 2008 Summer Olympics. She won the bronze medal at the 2003 World Aquatics Championships. She won the gold medal at the 2008 Women's European Water Polo Championship, and the bronze medal at the 2003 Women's European Water Polo Championship.

On club level she played for Yunost Volgograd in Russia.

== See also ==
- List of World Aquatics Championships medalists in water polo
