= Maria Yaina =

Russian water polo player

Personal information
- Full name: Mariya Nikolayevna Yayna
- Nationality: Russia
- Born: 25 January 1982 (age 44) Moscow, Soviet Union
- Height: 1.74 m (5 ft 9 in)
- Weight: 62 kg (137 lb)

Sport
- Sport: Water polo
- Position: driver

Senior clubs
- Years: Team
- ?-?: SKIF-CSP Izmailovo
National team
- Years: Team
- ?-?: Russia
Medal record
Representing Russia
World Championships
Bronze medal – third place	2003 Barcelona	Team competition

Mariya Nikolayevna Yayna (Мария Николаевна Яйна; born 25 January 1982) is a Russian female water polo player. She was a member of the Russia women's national water polo team, playing as a driver.

She was a part of the team at the 2004 Summer Olympics. On club level she played for SKIF-CSP Izmailovo in Russia.

== See also ==
- List of World Aquatics Championships medalists in water polo
