= Balázs Gercsák =

Hungarian swimmer (born 1986)

Personal information
- Full name: Balázs Gercsák
- National team: Hungary
- Born: 14 October 1986 (age 39) Budapest, Hungary
- Height: 1.78 m (5 ft 10 in)
- Weight: 70 kg (150 lb)

Sport
- Sport: Swimming
- Strokes: Freestyle
- Club: Jövő SC (HUN)
- College team: University of Florida (U.S.)
- Coach: Gábor Poszgai (HUN)

Balázs Gercsák (born 14 October 1986) is a Hungarian swimmer, who specialized in freestyle events. Gercsak is a former member of the Florida Gators, and a graduate of digital media productions at the University of Florida in Gainesville, Florida. He is also the brother of open water swimmer Csaba Gercsák, who won the bronze medal in the 25 km marathon at the 2011 FINA World Championships in Shanghai, China.

Gercsak made his first Hungarian team at the 2004 Summer Olympics in Athens, where he competed in the men's 4 × 200 m freestyle relay, along with his teammates Balázs Makány, Tamás Szűcs, and four-time Olympian Tamás Kerékjártó. Swimming the second leg in heat two, Gercsak recorded a split of 1:54.03, but the Hungarians rounded out the field to last place and sixteenth overall with a final time of 7:31.78.

At the 2008 Summer Olympics in Beijing, Gercsak competed as an individual swimmer in the men's 400 m freestyle. Leading up to his second Games, he posted a lifetime best and FINA B-standard entry time of 3:52.21 at the Hungarian National Trials in Budapest. He challenged six other swimmers on the second heat, including Greece's Spyridon Gianniotis, Switzerland's Dominik Meichtry, and South Africa's Jean Basson. Gercsak finished his heat in sixth place by more than a second behind Basson with a time of 3:54.14. Gercsak, however, failed to advance into the final, as he placed thirty-second overall in the preliminary heats.
