= Balázs Makány =

Hungarian swimmer

Personal information
- Full name: Balázs Makány
- National team: Hungary
- Born: 23 May 1987 (age 39) Pécs, Hungary
- Height: 1.90 m (6 ft 3 in)
- Weight: 90 kg (198 lb)

Sport
- Sport: Swimming
- Strokes: Freestyle
- Club: Kőbánya SC
- College team: Texas A&M University (U.S.)
- Coach: Gyorgy Turi

Balázs Makány (born May 23, 1987) is a Hungarian swimmer, who specialized in sprint and relay freestyle events. Makany is a member of Kőbánya Swimming Club, and is coached and trained by Gyorgy Turi. He is also a varsity swimmer for the Texas A&M Aggies, and a graduate of computer science at Texas A&M University in College Station, Texas.

Makany made his first Hungarian team, as a 17-year-old, at the 2004 Summer Olympics in Athens, where he competed in the men's 4 × 200 m freestyle relay, along with his teammates Balázs Gercsák, Tamás Szűcs, and four-time Olympian Tamás Kerékjártó. Swimming the third leg, Gercsak recorded a split of 1:52.75, and the Hungarian team went on to finish heat two in last place, for a total time of 7:31.78.

At the 2008 Summer Olympics in Beijing, Makany competed as an individual swimmer in the men's 100 m freestyle. Leading up to his second Games, he cleared the FINA B-standard entry time of 49.79 at the Hungarian National Trials in Budapest to secure a selection on the Olympic team. He challenged seven other swimmers on the fifth heat, including Czech Republic's Martin Verner and Shaune Fraser of the Cayman Islands. Makany raced to a second-place tie with Lithuania's Paulius Viktoravičius, posting a personal best of 49.27 seconds. Makany, however, failed to advance into the semifinals, as he placed twenty-eighth overall in the preliminary heats.
