= Dorina Mihai =

Romanian fencer

Personal information
- Full name: Dorina Gabriela Mihai
- Born: 1 June 1981 (age 45)
- Home town: Bucharest, Romania

Fencing career
- Sport: Fencing
- Weapon: sabre
- Hand: right-handed
- Club: CS Dinamo București
- Retired: 2007
- FIE ranking: rankings (archive)
Medal record
Women's sabre
Representing Romania
World Championships
Gold medal – first place	2003 Havana	Individual
European Championships
Silver medal – second place	2004 Copenhagen	Team

Dorina Mihai (born 1 June 1981) is a Romanian sabre fencer, world champion in 2003.

== Biography ==
Mihai took up fencing in primary school on the advice of a teacher, who directed her to foil. Disappointed not to earn any title in eleven years of practice, she thought of giving up, but eventually decided to try sabre, a weapon in which she quickly obtained results.

47th in world rankings before the event, she reached the final of the 2003 World Fencing Championships in Havana after defeating Cuba's Ana Faez Miclin in the quarter-finals, then Italy's Gioia Marzocca. She met reigning world champion Tan Xue of China and defeated her by a single hit to win the world title. By circumstance Mihai had found herself at the championships without her fencing mask and had been forced to use a Lexan visor mask, promoted by the International Fencing Federation because it shows the fencer's face. By winning the competition, Mihai also received a prize of $10.000 offered by the federation to the best-ranked athlete wearing a Lexan mask. For her performance Mihai was named "athlete of the year" along with weightlifter Valeriu Calancea.

Mihai decided to forgo the 2004 Summer Olympics to marry fellow fencer Cristian Lupu, a reserve in the men's national team, and to give birth to a son, Luca Nicolas. Cătălina Gheorghițoaia, who went in her place, finished fourth. Mihai's return to competition did not yield further results. When the women's national sabre team was disbanded for lack of funds, Mihai decided to retire from competition. Her club CS Dinamo București being subordinated to the Ministry of Internal Affairs, she decided to join the Romanian Police. She worked three years in the field before joining the Ilfov County Police Inspectorate.
