= Zsuzsanna Csobánki =

Hungarian swimmer

Personal information
- Full name: Csobánki Zsuzsanna
- Nationality: Hungary
- Born: 28 March 1983 (age 43) Budapest
- Height: 1.76 m (5 ft 9 in)
- Weight: 62 kg (137 lb)

Sport
- Sport: Swimming
- Strokes: Freestyle
- Club: Ferencvárosi Torna Club-Print 17

Zsuzsanna Csobánki (born 28 March 1983 in Budapest) is a female Hungarian swimmer, who competed for her native country at the 2004 Summer Olympics in Athens, Greece.
