= Gaël Touya =

French fencer (born 1973)

Personal information
- Born: 23 October 1973 (age 52) Longeville-lès-Metz, France

Sport
- Sport: Fencing
- Coached by: René Geuna
Medal record
Men's fencing
Representing France
Olympic Games
Gold medal – first place	2004 Athens	Team sabre
World Championships
Gold medal – first place	1997 Cape Town	Team sabre
Silver medal – second place	1998 La Chaux-de-Fonds	Team sabre
Summer Universiade
Silver medal – second place	1993 Buffalo	Individual sabre
Silver medal – second place	1993 Buffalo	Team sabre
Silver medal – second place	1995 Fukuoka	Team sabre
Bronze medal – third place	1995 Fukuoka	Individual sabre

Gaël Roger Touya (born 23 October 1973) is a French fencer. He won a gold medal at the 2004 Summer Olympics in Athens, in team sabre, together with his brother Damien Touya and Julien Pillet.
