= Dimitrios Kostakos =

Greek fencer

Personal information
- Born: 8 March 1978 (age 48)

Sport
- Sport: Fencing

Dimitrios Kostakos (Greek: Δημήτριος Κωστάκος) (born 8 March 1978) is a Greek fencer. He competed in the team sabre event at the 2004 Summer Olympics.
