= Tamás Szűcs =

Hungarian swimmer

Personal information
- Full name: Tamás Szűcs
- National team: Hungary
- Born: 18 February 1981 (age 45) Budapest, Hungary
- Height: 1.92 m (6 ft 4 in)
- Weight: 87 kg (192 lb)

Sport
- Sport: Swimming
- Strokes: Freestyle
- Club: Ferencvárosi TC
- College team: University of South Carolina (U.S.)
- Coach: Don Gibb (U.S.)

Tamás Szűcs (born February 18, 1981) is a Hungarian former swimmer, who specialized in freestyle events. He is a two-time SEC titleholder in the 50 and 200 m freestyle, and a former member of the swimming team for the South Carolina Gamecocks at the University of South Carolina in Columbia, South Carolina.

Szucs qualified for two swimming events at the 2004 Summer Olympics in Athens, by clearing a FINA B-standard entry time of 1:50.79 (200 m freestyle) from the national championships in Budapest. In the 200 m freestyle, Szucs challenged seven other swimmers on the fifth heat, including three-time Olympian Jacob Carstensen of Denmark. He edged out South Korea's Han Kyu-Chul to take a seventh spot and thirty-second overall by two hundredths of a second (0.02) in 1:52.26. Szucs also teamed up with Balázs Gercsák, Balázs Makány, and Tamás Kerékjártó in the 4 × 200 m freestyle relay. Swimming the anchor leg, Szucs recorded a split of 1:52.35, and the Hungarian team finished the heats in sixteenth overall with a slowest final time of 7:31.78.
