= Vladyslav Tretiak =

Ukrainian fencer (born 1980)

Personal information
- Full name: Vladyslav Vasylovych Tretiak
- Born: 21 February 1980 (age 46) Kyiv, Ukrainian SSR, Soviet Union
- Height: 1.75 m (5 ft 9 in)
- Weight: 60 kg (132 lb)

Fencing career
- Sport: Fencing
- Weapon: Sabre
- FIE ranking: current ranking
Medal record
Men's fencing
Representing Ukraine
Olympic Games
Bronze medal – third place	2004 Athens	Individual sabre
World Championships
Silver medal – second place	2006 Turin	Team sabre
Bronze medal – third place	2003 Havana	Team sabre
European Championships
Bronze medal – third place	2004 Copenhagen	Team sabre
Universiade
Silver medal – second place	2003 Daegu	Team sabre
Silver medal – second place	2005 Izmir	Team sabre
Bronze medal – third place	2005 Izmir	Individual sabre
World Juniors Championships
Bronze medal – third place	2000 South Bend	Team sabre

Vladyslav Vasylovych Tretiak (Ukrainian: Владислав Васильович Третяк; born 21 February 1980) is a Ukrainian sabre fencer.

Tretiak competed in men's sabre at the 2004 Summer Olympics. He reached the semifinals after defeating teammate Volodymyr Lukashenko, but lost to Hungary's Zsolt Nemcsik. He prevailed over Dmitry Lapkes of Belarus to take the bronze medal.

He finished 3rd in Team Sabre at the 2003 World Championships. At the 2006 World Fencing Championships he won a silver medal in the sabre team event together with Dmytro Boiko, Volodymyr Lukashenko and Oleh Shturbabin.
