= Volodymyr Lukashenko =

Ukrainian fencer (born 1980)

Personal information
- Full name: Volodymyr Volodymyrovych Lukashenko
- Born: February 14, 1980 (age 46) Kyiv, Ukrainian SSR, Soviet Union
- Height: 1.77 m (5 ft 10 in)
- Weight: 68 kg (150 lb)

Fencing career
- Sport: Fencing
- Weapon: Sabre
- Hand: Right-handed
- Retired: 2009
- FIE ranking: ranking (archive)
Medal record
Men's sabre fencing
Representing Ukraine
World Championships
Gold medal – first place	2003 Havana	Individual sabre
Silver medal – second place	2006 Turin	Team sabre
Bronze medal – third place	2003 Havana	Team sabre
European Championships
Silver medal – second place	2006 İzmir	Individual sabre
Bronze medal – third place	2000 Madeira	Team sabre
Bronze medal – third place	2002 Moscow	Individual sabre
Summer Universiade
Gold medal – first place	2003 Daegu	Individual sabre
Silver medal – second place	2003 Daegu	Team sabre
Silver medal – second place	2005 Izmir	Team sabre

Volodymyr Volodymyrovych Lukashenko (Ukrainian: Володимир Володимирович Лукашенко; often Vladimir from Russian, born 14 February 1980) is a Ukrainian sabre fencer.

== Career ==
He competed at the 2000 and 2004 Summer Olympics.

Lukashenko won the silver medal in the sabre team event at the 2006 World Fencing Championships after losing to France in the final. He accomplished this with his teammates Dmytro Boiko, Oleh Shturbabin and Vladyslav Tretiak.

He was the 2003 World Champion for Men's Sabre.

== Personal life ==
Lukashenko's son, Darii, is also a fencer.
