= Gianpiero Pastore =

Italian fencer (born 1976)

Personal information
- Born: 7 May 1976 (age 50) Salerno, Italy

Sport
- Sport: Fencing
Medal record
Men's fencing
Representing Italy
Olympic Games
Silver medal – second place	2004 Athens	Sabre Team
Bronze medal – third place	2008 Beijing	Sabre Team
World Championships
Bronze medal – third place	2011 Catania	Team Sabre

Gianpiero Pastore (born 7 May 1976 in Salerno) is an Italian fencer and Olympic medal winner in team sabre competition.
