= Ekaterina Salimova =

Russian water polo player

Personal information
- Full name: Yekaterina Ralifovna Salimova
- Nationality: Russia
- Born: 2 April 1982 (age 44) Zlatoust, Soviet Union
- Height: 1.77 m (5 ft 10 in)
- Weight: 70 kg (150 lb)

Sport
- Sport: Water polo
- Position: centre back

Senior clubs
- Years: Team
- ?-?: Uralochka Zlatoust
National team
- Years: Team
- ?-?: Russia
Medal record
Representing Russia
World Championships
Bronze medal – third place	2003 Barcelona	Team competition

Yekaterina Ralifovna Salimova (Екатерина Ралифовна Салимова, born 2 April 1982) is a Russian former water polo player. She was a member of the Russia women's national water polo team, playing as a centre back.

She was a member of the team at the 2004 Summer Olympics, and 2003 World Aquatics Championships.

On club level she played for Uralochka Zlatoust in Russia.

== See also ==
- List of World Aquatics Championships medalists in water polo
