= Constantine Manetas =

Greek fencer (born 1980)

Personal information
- Born: 7 January 1980 (age 46)

Sport
- Sport: Fencing

Constantine Manetas (born 7 January 1980) is a Greek fencer. He competed in the individual and team sabre events at the 2004 Summer Olympics.
