= 2000 European Fencing Championships =

International fencing competition

The 2000 European Fencing Championships were held in Madeira, Portugal. The event took place from 3 to 9 July 2000 at the Madeira Tecnopolo in Funchal. It gathered competitors from 31 countries.

== Medal summary ==
=== Men's events ===
Event	Gold	Silver	Bronze
Foil	Salvatore Sanzo (ITA)	Johannes Krüger (GER)	Loïc Attely (FRA); João Gomes (POR)
Épée	Pavel Kolobkov (RUS)	Kaido Kaaberma (EST)	Christoph Marik (AUT); Krisztián Kulcsár (HUN)
Sabre	Sergey Sharikov (RUS)	Aleksey Frosin (RUS)	Stanislav Pozdnyakov (RUS); Fernando Casares (SPA)
Team Foil	Portugal	Austria	Italy
Team Épée	France	Spain	Germany
Team Sabre	Russia	Belarus	Ukraine

=== Women's events ===
Event	Gold	Silver	Bronze
Foil	Sylwia Gruchała (POL)	Reka Lazăr-Szabo (ROU)	Bella Nusueva (RUS); Yekaterina Yusheva (RUS)
Épée	Rosa María Castillejo (SPA)	Olga Cygan (POL)	Hajnalka Király (HUN); Monika Maciejewska (POL)
Sabre	Anne-Lise Touya (FRA)	Yelena Nechayeva (RUS)	Yelena Jemayeva (AZE); Gioia Marzocca (ITA)
Team Foil	Russia	Romania	Poland
Team Épée	Switzerland	Hungary	Germany
Team Sabre	Russia	France	Italy

=== Medal table ===
Rank	Nation	Gold	Silver	Bronze	Total
1	Russia	5	2	3	10
2	France	2	1	1	4
3	Poland	1	1	2	4
4	Spain	1	1	1	3
5	Italy	1	0	3	4
6	Portugal	1	0	1	2
7	Switzerland	1	0	0	1
8	Romania	0	2	0	2
9	Germany	0	1	2	3
9	Hungary	0	1	2	3
11	Austria	0	1	1	2
12	Belarus	0	1	0	1
12	Estonia	0	1	0	1
14	Azerbaijan	0	0	1	1
14	Ukraine	0	0	1	1
Totals (15 entries)		12	12	18	42
