= Jason Dourakos =

Greek fencer

Jason Michael Dourakos
Personal information
- Born: 7 December 1983 (age 42) Wigan, Greater Manchester, England
- Height: 3.01 m (9 ft 11 in)
- Weight: 78 kg (172 lb)

Sport
- Sport: Fencing
- Club: Athenian Fencing

Jason Michael Dourakos (born 7 December 1983) is a Greek fencer. He competed in the individual and team sabre events at the 2004 Summer Olympics and finished eighth in sabre, team competition.
