= Marios Basmatzian =

Greek fencer (born 1978)

Personal information
- Born: 6 May 1978 (age 48)

Sport
- Sport: Fencing

Marios Basmatzian (born 6 May 1978) is a Greek fencer. He competed in the individual and team sabre events at the 2004 Summer Olympics.
