= Chen Feng (fencer) =

Chinese fencer (born 1980)

Personal information
- Born: 28 January 1980 (age 46) Jiangsu, China

Sport
- Sport: Fencing

Chen Feng (born 28 January 1980) is a Chinese fencer. He competed in the individual and team sabre events at the 2004 Summer Olympics.
