= Volodymyr Kaliuzhniy =

Ukrainian fencer (born 1972)

Volodymyr Kaliuzhnyi
Personal information
- Born: 5 July 1972 (age 54) Kyiv, Ukrainian SSR, Soviet Union
- Height: 1.90 m (6 ft 3 in)
- Weight: 90 kg (200 lb)

Fencing career
- Sport: Fencing
- Country: Ukraine
- Weapon: Sabre
- Club: CSKA Kiev
- FIE ranking: archive
Medal record
Men's sabre
European Championships
Representing Ukraine
Bronze medal – third place	2000 Madeira	Team
Bronze medal – third place	2004 Copenhagen	Team
Summer Universiade
Representing Soviet Union
Bronze medal – third place	1991 Sheffield	Team
Representing Ukraine
Bronze medal – third place	1997 Sicily	Team

Volodymyr Vitaliyovych Kaliuzhnyi (Ukrainian: Володимир Віталійович Калюжний; born 5 July 1972) is a Ukrainian fencer. He competed in the sabre events at the 1996, 2000 and 2004 Summer Olympics.
