= Mohamed Rebai =

Tunisian fencer

Personal information
- Born: 8 May 1977 (age 49)

Sport
- Sport: Fencing

Mohamed Rebai (born 8 May 1977) is a Tunisian fencer. He competed in the individual sabre event at the 2004 Summer Olympics, losing his only bout.
