= Domonkos Ferjancsik =

Hungarian fencer (born 1975)

Personal information
- Born: 7 September 1975 (age 50) Budapest, Hungary

Sport
- Sport: Fencing

Domonkos Ferjancsik (born 7 September 1975) is a Hungarian fencer. He competed in the individual and team sabre events at the 2000 and 2004 Summer Olympics. He won a silver and bronze medal at the 2003 World Fencing Championships and a gold medal at the 1998 World Fencing Championships.
