= Kende Fodor =

Hungarian fencer

Personal information
- Born: 4 November 1976 (age 49) Budapest, Hungary

Sport
- Sport: Fencing

Kende Fodor (born 4 November 1976) is a Hungarian fencer. He competed in the team sabre event at the 2004 Summer Olympics.
