= Huang Yaojiang =

Chinese fencer (born 1982)

Personal information
- Born: 21 March 1982 (age 44) Guangdong, China

Sport
- Country: China
- Sport: Fencing
- Event(s): Men's Individual Sabre, Men's Team Sabre
- Now coaching: YJ Fencing Centre

Huang Yaojiang (simplified Chinese: 黄耀江; traditional Chinese: 黃耀江; pinyin: Huáng Yàojiāng; Jyutping: Wong4 Yiu6 Gong1; born March 21, 1982, in Guangdong) is a Chinese sabre fencer.

At the 2004 Athens Olympics, he finished 27th in the Individual Sabre event and 7th in the Team Sabre event. He also competed at the 2008 Beijing Olympics.
