= Zsolt Nemcsik =

Hungarian fencer (born 1977)

Personal information
- Born: 15 August 1977 (age 48) Budapest, Hungary
- Height: 1.88 m (6 ft 2 in)
- Weight: 88 kg (194 lb)

Fencing career
- Sport: Fencing
- Country: Hungary
- Weapon: sabre
- Hand: right-handed
- Club: Vasas
- Head coach: György Gerevich
Medal record
Men's fencing
Representing Hungary
| Event | 1st | 2nd | 3rd |
|---|---|---|---|
| Olympic Games | 0 | 1 | 0 |
| World Championships | 2 | 3 | 0 |
| European Championships | 0 | 2 | 3 |
| Total | 2 | 6 | 3 |
Olympic Games
| Silver medal – second place | 2004 Athens | Sabre Individual |

Zsolt Nemcsik (born 15 August 1977 in Budapest) is a Hungarian sabre fencer. He competed at three Olympic Games.

Nemcsik's two greatest accomplishments is winning the silver medal in the 2004 Olympic Games after losing to Aldo Montano in the final, and also winning the gold medal in the 2007 World Fencing Championships after beating France in the final.

In 2010 he moved to Frascati, joining the local fencing club. While continuing his career as an athlete, he's now also involved in teaching.

== Other achievements ==
1998 World Fencing Championships, team sabre
2001 World Fencing Championships, team sabre
2003 World Fencing Championships, team sabre
2004 Athens Summer Olympics, individual sabre
2006 World Fencing Championships, individual sabre
2007 World Fencing Championships, team sabre

== Awards ==
- Hungarian Fencer of the Year (1): 2001, 2004, 2005, 2006

Orders and special awards

- Order of Merit of the Republic of Hungary – Knight's Cross (2004)
