= Balázs Lengyel (fencer) =

Hungarian fencer (born 1980)

Personal information
- Born: 27 June 1980 (age 46) Budapest, Hungary

Sport
- Sport: Fencing

Balázs Lengyel (born 27 June 1980) is a Hungarian fencer. He competed in the individual and team sabre events at the 2004 Summer Olympics.
